= Taman Teknologi MRT station =

Metro station in Kuala Lumpur, Malaysia

PY30 Taman Teknologi
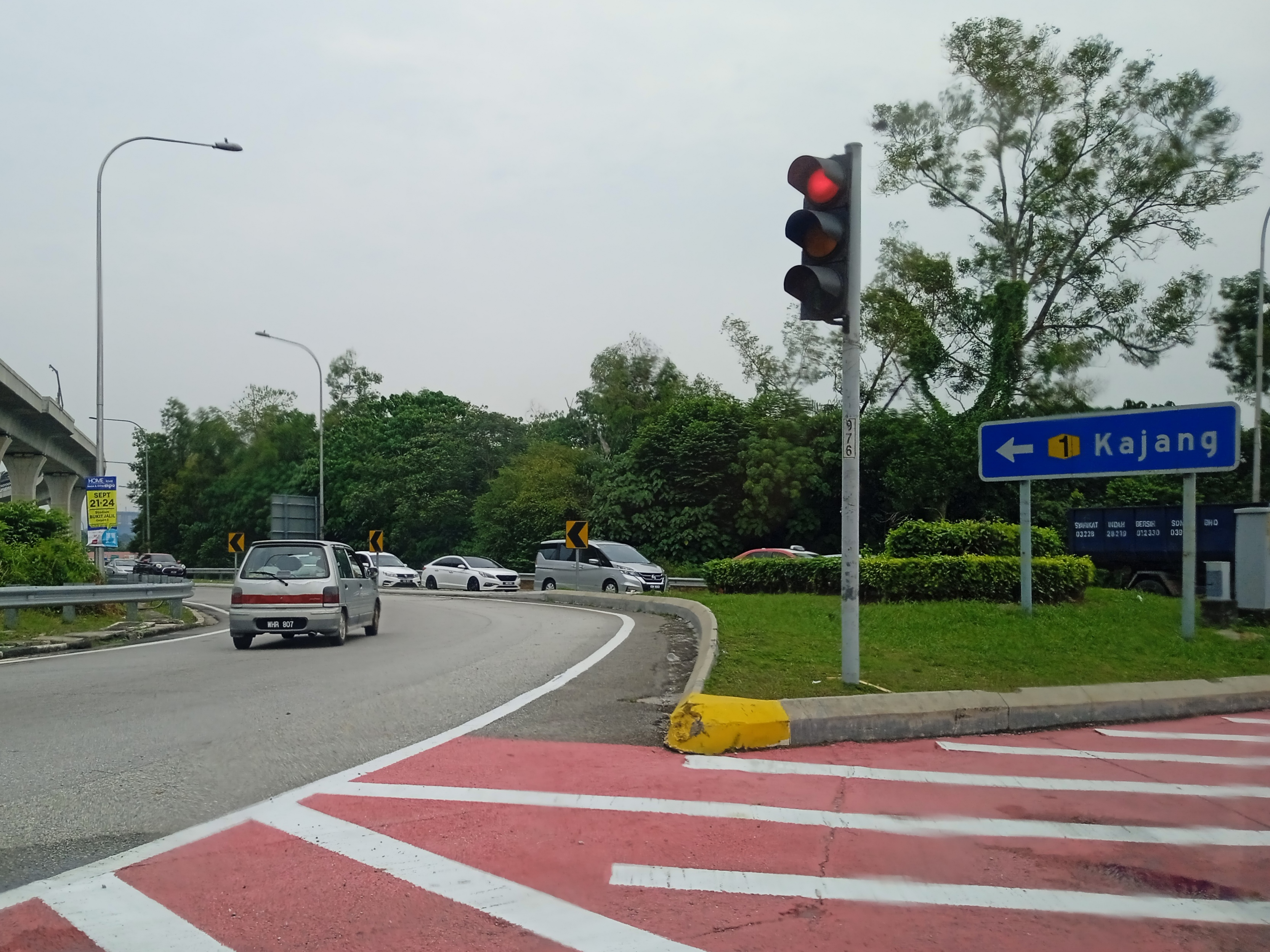

General information
- Location: Bukit Jalil, Kuala Lumpur, Malaysia
- Coordinates: 3.0516°N 101.7059°E
- System: MRT station
- Owner: MRT Corp
- Line: 12
- Platforms: Side
- Tracks: 2

Construction
- Parking: Available, pay.

Other information
- Station code: PY30

Services
Preceding station		Following station
Sungai Besi towards Kwasa Damansara	Putrajaya Line (If this station is constructed)	Serdang Raya Utara towards Putrajaya Sentral
Location

The Taman Teknologi MRT station, previously known as Technology Park is a future provisional Mass Rapid Transit (MRT) station. If constructed, it will serve the suburb of Bukit Jalil (mainly Technology Park in Kuala Lumpur, Malaysia and serve as one of the stations on Klang Valley Mass Rapid Transit (KVMRT) Putrajaya Line. The station will be planned to be built at the tin mine lake near Mines North toll plaza of the Besraya Expressway.

The SSP line (now the Putrajaya line) has been opened fully as of 16 March 2023. However, Taman Teknologi station, will not be built until it meets the demands.

The station is planned to accommodate the new Maju Kuala Lumpur development under Maju Holdings Sdn Bhd. However, the construction of the development is currently stalled due to financial disputes.
