= Taman Universiti MRT station =

Future station in Seri Kembangan, Selangor, Malaysia

PY35 Taman Universiti
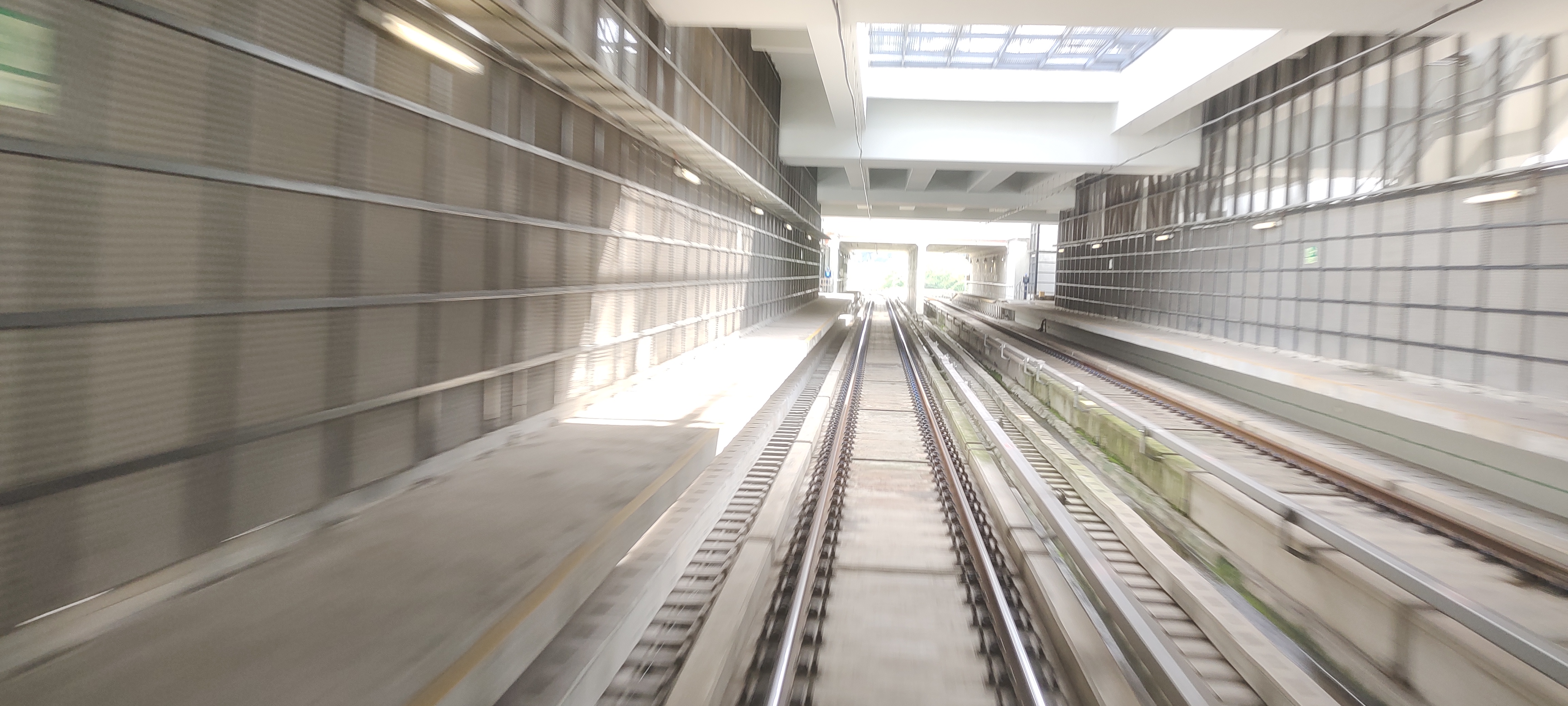

General information
- Location: Jalan Putra Permai, 43300 Seri Kembangan, Selangor; Malaysia
- System: | Future MRT station
- Owner: MRT Corp
- Line: 12 Putrajaya Line
- Platforms: 2 side platforms
- Tracks: 2

Construction
- Structure type: Half-sunken
- Parking: Not available
- Cycle facilities: Not available

Other information
- Status: Planning
- Station code: PY35

History
- Opening: TBD

Services
Preceding station		Following station
UPM towards Kwasa Damansara	Putrajaya Line (when this station is constructed)	Taman Equine towards Putrajaya Sentral

The Taman Universiti MRT station is a future provisional mass rapid transit (MRT) station. When constructed, it would serve the nearby Taman Universiti Indah in Seri Kembangan, Selangor, Malaysia and serve as one of the stations on Klang Valley Mass Rapid Transit (KVMRT) Putrajaya line. The station will be built on the side of Jalan Putra Permai, nearby the National Hydraulic Research Institute of Malaysia building.
