= Taman Naga Emas MRT station =

Metro station in Selangor, Malaysia

PY28 Taman Naga Emas

General information
- Other names: Malay: تامن ناݢ امس (Jawi); Chinese: 金龙园; Tamil: தாமான் நாகா இமாஸ்
- Location: Jalan Naga Emas, Taman Naga Emas; 57100 Kuala Lumpur; Malaysia
- System: Rapid KL
- Owner: MRT Corp
- Operator: Rapid Rail
- Line: 12 Putrajaya Line
- Platforms: 1 island platform
- Tracks: 2

Construction
- Parking: Available
- Accessible: Yes

Other information
- Status: Operational
- Station code: PY28

History
- Opened: 16 March 2023; 3 years ago

Services
Preceding station		Following station
Kuchai towards Kwasa Damansara	Putrajaya Line	Sungai Besi towards Putrajaya Sentral
Location

The Taman Naga Emas MRT station is a mass rapid transit (MRT) station in the Salak Selatan subdistrict in southern Kuala Lumpur, Malaysia. It is one of the stations on the MRT Putrajaya Line.

The station was opened to the public on 16 March 2023.

== Location ==
The station is near the North-South Expressway Southern Route and the Sungai Besi Expressway. It is also approximately 1.5 km west of Bandar Tasik Selatan station. There is one shuttle bus connecting the station to the Sri Petaling township.
