= Serdang Depot =

Serdang Depot Depoh Serdang
- Interactive map of Serdang Depot; Depoh Serdang

Location
- Location: Jalan Seri Kembangan, Serdang, Selangor
- Coordinates: 2.9987°N 101.6918°E

Characteristics
- Owner: MRT Corp
- Operator: Rapid Rail
- Roads: FT 3215
- Rolling stock: Hyundai Rotem
- Routes served: 12 Putrajaya Line

Serdang Depot (Malay: Depoh Serdang) is a rail yard in Seri Kembangan, Selangor, Malaysia, serving the MRT Putrajaya Line.

== Background ==
The depot was built at the site of a former research estate of the Universiti Putra Malaysia (UPM) nearby.

== Functions ==
It houses a central maintenance with train overhaul facilities for trains on the Putrajaya Line. The depot is one of two yards for the Putrajaya Line, the other being the Sungai Buloh Depot, which is also shared with Kajang Line.
