= Kampung Selamat MRT station =

Mass Rapid Transit station in Malaysia

PY03 Kampung Selamat
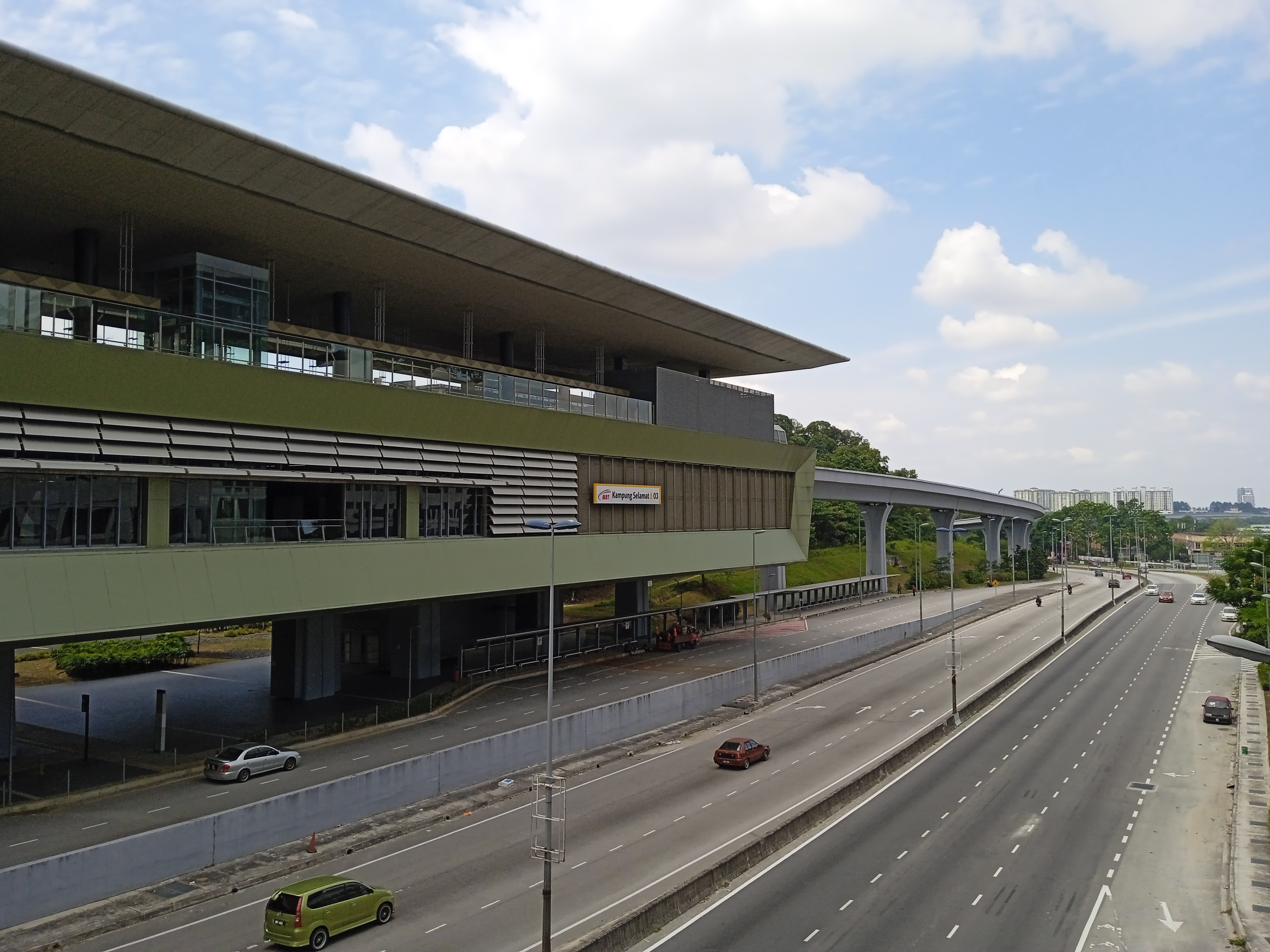
- View of the station along Jalan Sungai Buloh from the SqWhere Linkway.

General information
- Other names: Malay: کامڤوڠ سلامت (Jawi); Chinese: 甘榜士拉玛; Tamil: கம்போங் செலாமாட்
- Location: Jalan Sungai Buloh, Kota Damansara, PJU5, 47810 Petaling Jaya; Selangor; Malaysia
- Coordinates: 3°11′50.53″N 101°34′42.33″E
- System: Rapid KL
- Owner: MRT Corp
- Operator: Rapid Rail
- Line: 12 Putrajaya Line
- Platforms: 2 side platforms
- Tracks: 2

Construction
- Structure type: Elevated
- Parking: Not available
- Cycle facilities: Available; 15 bicycle bays
- Accessible: Yes

Other information
- Station code: PY03 (after 16 June 2022); SBK02 (before 16 June 2022)

History
- Opened: 16 December 2016; 9 years ago (Sungai Buloh - Kajang Line); 16 June 2022; 4 years ago (Putrajaya Line)
- Former names: Kampung Baru Sungai Buloh

Services
Preceding station		Following station
Kwasa Damansara Terminus	Putrajaya Line	Sungai Buloh towards Putrajaya Sentral
Location

The Kampung Selamat MRT station is a mass rapid transit (MRT) station serving the areas of Kampung Selamat and Kampung Baru Sungai Buloh in Sungai Buloh, Selangor, Malaysia. The station was one of the stations on the MRT Sungai Buloh - Kajang Line and was opened on 16 December 2016 under Phase 1 operations of the line.

The station name is taken from the nearby Kampung Selamat, which lies on the east side of Jalan Sungai Buloh.

The station was temporarily closed for migration work for the MRT SSP Line / MRT Putrajaya Line from November 17-18, 2018 for early track and system connection works, March 9-10, 2019 for track switch installation for depot access, June 27-28 & November 14-15, 2020 for further migration works. The station was closed on October 9, 2021 till the official opening of MRT Putrajaya Line Phase 1 on 16 June 2022.

The station is currently served by the MRT Putrajaya Line, being one of 3 stations that were transferred to the line from the Kajang Line when it began operations on 16 June 2022.

== Station features ==
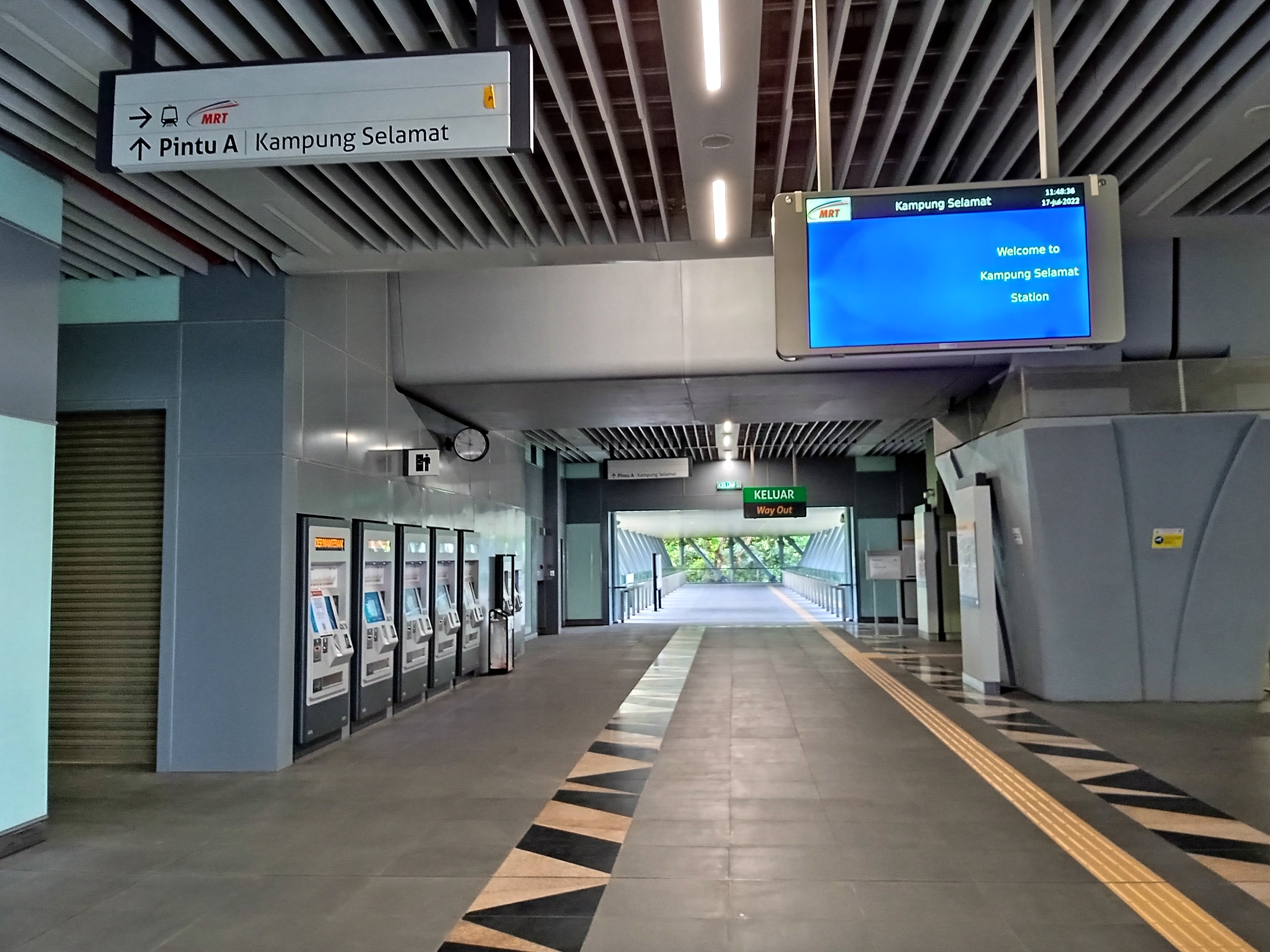
Concourse level of the station.

Location map of station.

=== Station location ===
The station is an elevated station located on the east side of Jalan Sungai Buloh, physically being within the city of Petaling Jaya. The design of the station is the standard elevated station design comprising two levels above the ground level. The first level is the concourse level, the two side platforms flanking the double tracks above.

The station features a long pedestrian bridge over Jalan Sungai Buloh and Jalan Welfare, linking the station to its two entrances. The bridge also connects to link bridges directly leading into the SqWhere and D'sara Sentral developments.

=== Station layout ===
L2	Platform Level	Side platform
L2	Platform Level	Platform 2: 12 Putrajaya Line towards PY01 Kwasa Damansara (→)
L2	Platform Level	Platform 1: 12 Putrajaya Line towards PY41 Putrajaya Sentral (←)
L2	Platform Level	Side platform
L1	Concourse	Faregates to paid area, ticketing machines, customer service office, station control, shops, Entrance A escalator down to ground level, pedestrian bridge across Jalan Sungai Buloh linking SqWhere and D'sara Sentral developments, as well as Entrance C staircase down to Jalan Welfare and Entrance B escalators/lifts/stairs down to feeder bus terminal
G	Ground Level	Taxi lay-by, Kiss and ride lay-by, staff parking, feeder bus terminal across Jalan Sungai Buloh at Entrance B

=== Exits and entrances ===
The station has three entrances, with Entrance A on the same side of Jalan Sungai Buloh as the station, and Entrances B and C as well as the link bridges to the SqWhere SOVO, a mixed development project by Selangor Dredging Berhad, and D'sara Sentral developments, a mixed development project by the Mah Sing Group, on the other side of Jalan Sungai Buloh from the station and linked via a long pedestrian bridge.

Putrajaya Line station
Entrance	Location	Destination	Picture
A	East side of Jalan Sungai Buloh	Feeder bus stop, taxi and private vehicle lay-by	
B	West side of Jalan Sungai Buloh	Feeder bus stop, taxi and private vehicle lay-by	
C	South side of Jalan Welfare	Taxi and private vehicle lay-by	
D'Sara Sentral	Pedestrian bridge to D'sara Sentral	D'sara Sentral	
SqWhere	Pedestrian bridge to SqWhere	SqWhere SOVO	

== Connection ==
=== Feeder Bus Services ===
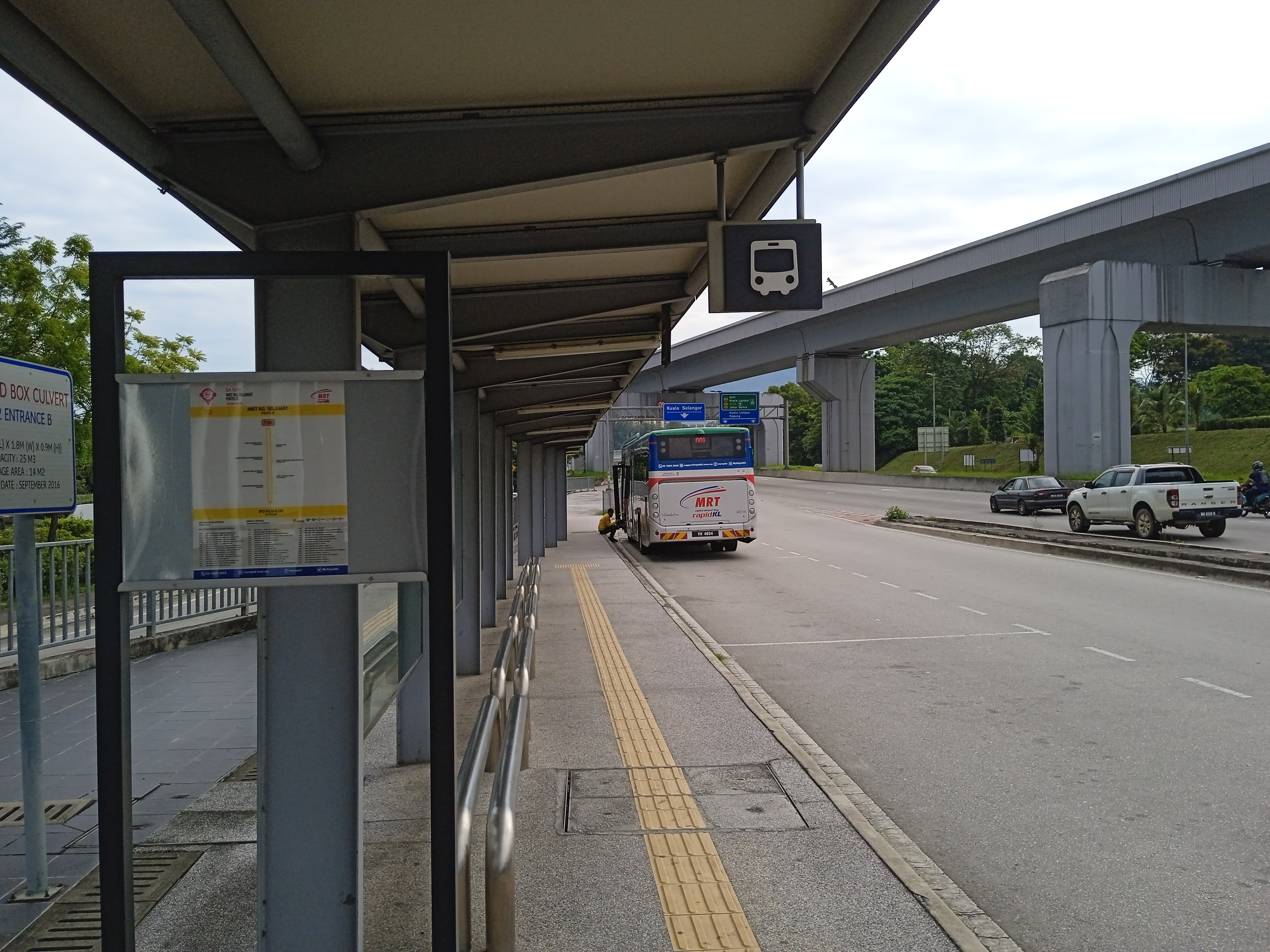
Kampung Selamat MRT Feeder Bus Stop

Feeder buses have been operating at the station since its opening in 2022, linking the station with Kampung Baru Sungai Buloh. The feeder buses operate from the station's feeder bus hub, accessed via Entrance B across Jalan Sungai Buloh from the station via a pedestrian bridge.

Route No.	Origin	Desitination	Via
T104	PY03 Kampung Selamat (Entrance B)	Kampung Baru Sungai Buloh	Jalan Welfare Jalan Perkhidmatan; Jalan Besar Sungai Buloh District Police Headquarters; Jalan Kati U19/F

== Nearby ==
- Bright Sparklers disaster memorial
