= Putrajaya Line =

Second Malaysian MRT line

MRT Putrajaya Line

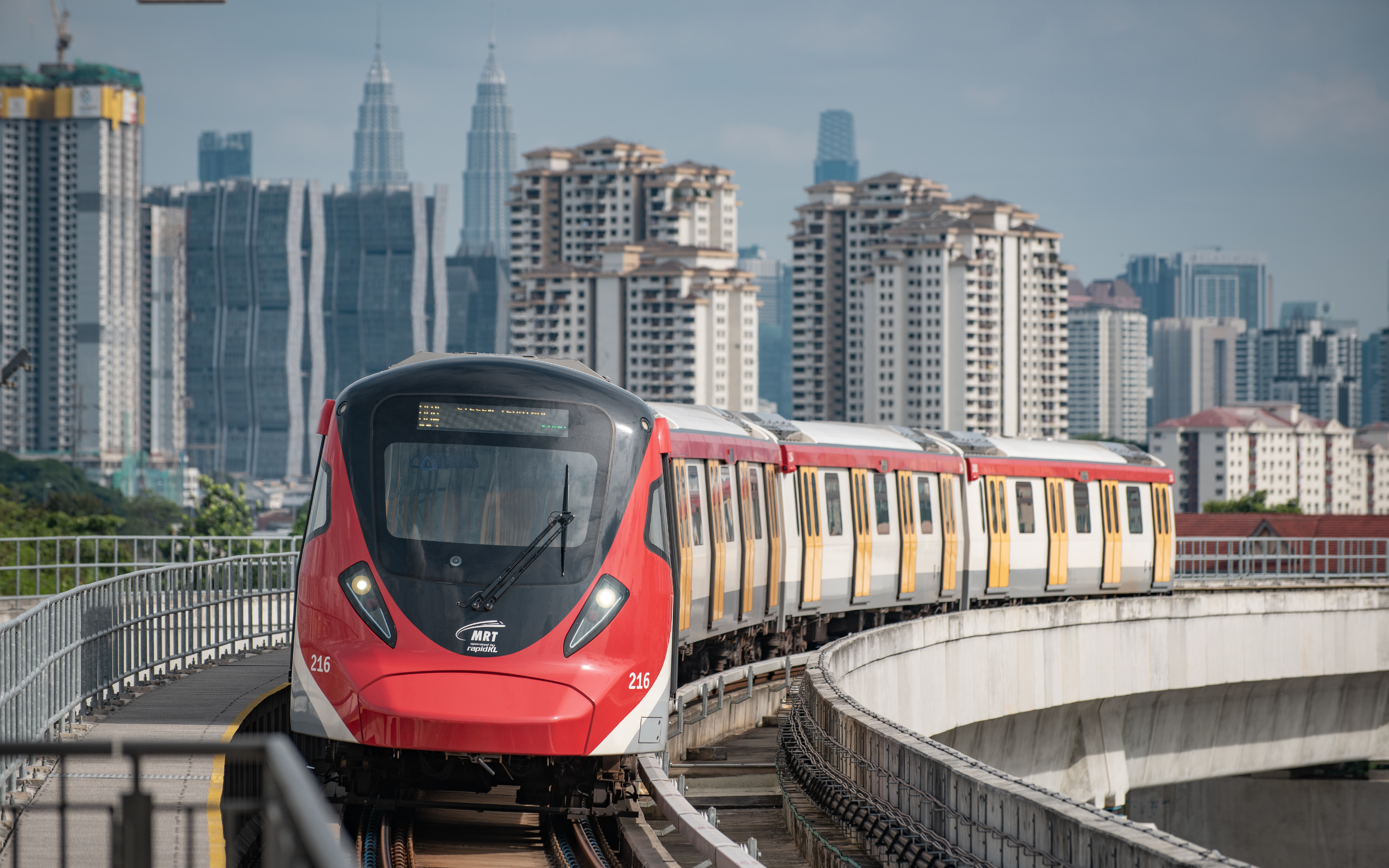
- Hyundai Rotem EMU rolling stock entering Kampung Batu station

Overview
- Other name(s): MRT2, SSP, PYL
- Native name: MRT Laluan Putrajaya
- Status: Operational
- Owner: MRT Corp
- Line number: 12 (yellow)
- Locale: Klang Valley
- Termini: PY01 Kwasa Damansara; PY41 Putrajaya Sentral
- Stations: 36 and 5 reserved (Note: Excluding annexed stations from Kajang Line and the cancelled Bandar Malaysia stations)
- Website: myrapid.com.my

Service
- Type: Rapid transit
- System: Rapid KL; Klang Valley Integrated Transit System
- Services: Kwasa Damansara–Putrajaya Sentral
- Operator: Rapid Rail
- Depot(s): Sungai Buloh Depot; Serdang Depot
- Rolling stock: 49 Hyundai Rotem four-car trainsets (wide profile)
- Daily ridership: 190,663 (Q2 2026); 234,158 (2025; Highest)
- Ridership: 55.67 million (2025) (▲15.7%)

History
- Opened: Phase 1: 16 June 2022; 4 years ago Kwasa Damansara – Kampung Batu; Phase 2: 16 March 2023; 3 years ago Kentonmen – Putrajaya Sentral

Technical
- Line length: 57.7 km (35.9 mi); Elevated: 44.2 km (27.5 mi); Underground: 13.5 km (8.4 mi)
- Track gauge: 1,435 mm (4 ft 8 1/2 in) standard gauge
- Electrification: 750 V DC third rail
- Conduction system: Automated and driverless
- Operating speed: 80 to 90 km/h (50 to 56 mph)

The MRT Putrajaya Line is the second Mass Rapid Transit (MRT) line in Klang Valley, Malaysia, and the third fully automated and driverless rail system in the country. It was previously known as the MRT Sungai Buloh–Serdang–Putrajaya Line. The line stretches from Kwasa Damansara to Putrajaya and runs through densely populated areas such as Sri Damansara, Kepong, Batu, Jalan Ipoh, Sentul, Kampung Baru, Jalan Tun Razak, KLCC, Tun Razak Exchange, Kuchai Lama, Seri Kembangan and Cyberjaya.

Phase 1 operations of the line between Kwasa Damansara and Kampung Batu commenced on 16 June 2022. While the Phase 2 which covers the remaining of the line including the underground stretch was opened on 16 March 2023.

The line is numbered 12 and coloured yellow on official transit maps. The line was developed and owned by MRT Corp but operated as part of the Rapid KL network by Rapid Rail. It also forms part of the Klang Valley Integrated Transit System. The line, totalling 57.7 km (35 miles 68 chains) in length, includes 5.5 km (3.4 mi) annexed from the MRT Kajang Line, making it the longest metro line in Malaysia, and currently the second longest driverless rapid transit line in the world, behind the Dubai Metro Red Line. The line includes a 13.5 km (8.4 mi) underground section. A total of 36 stations, 9 of them underground, were built.

== Route ==
Route of Putrajaya Line

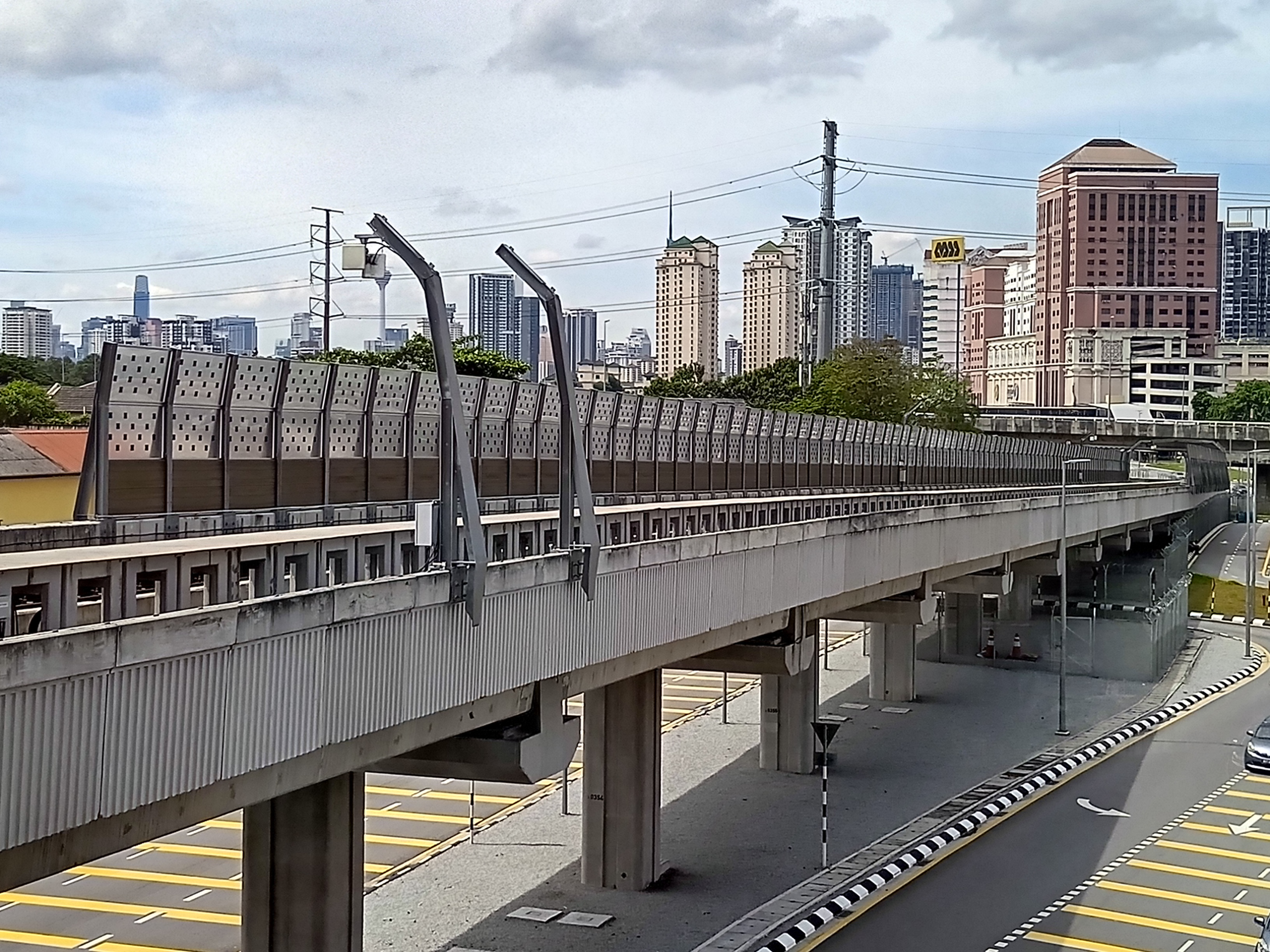
Railway track heading underground at Jalan Sultan Azlan Shah, from Kentonmen MRT station

The MRT starts in Kwasa Damansara where it took over the section from this station to Sungai Buloh from the Kajang Line. From Sungai Buloh, the line runs parallel with the Port Klang Branch of the KTM West Coast railway line to Kepong Sentral/Sri Damansara Timur. The MRT interchanges with the KTM line at Sungai Buloh and Sri Damansara Timur.

The MRT line then continues towards the towns of Kepong and Jinjang. At Jalan Ipoh, the line descends underground. Jalan Ipoh station itself is the only station on the network to be half-sunken/sub-surface. The line runs under Jalan Ipoh to Titiwangsa where it interchanges with the Ampang and Sri Petaling lines and KL Monorail. The line then runs under the Kuala Lumpur Hospital (HKL) and through Kampung Baru before it meets the Kelana Jaya Line at Ampang Park. The line proceeds towards the KLCC subdistrict at Persiaran KLCC. The line then continues to Tun Razak Exchange, interchanging with the Kajang Line. The Putrajaya Line then interchanges again with the Ampang and Sri Petaling Lines at Chan Sow Lin.

The MRT line runs under the planned Bandar Malaysia project with two provisional stations, before resurfacing at the Taman Desa portal, just before Kuchai station. Once again, the line meets the Sri Petaling line at Sungai Besi, then continuing to serve Seri Kembangan and southern Puchong at several stations. Here, the line briefly parallels the main KTM West Coast railway line and Express Rail Link line until Serdang Raya Selatan, and veers off towards Universiti Putra Malaysia (UPM) southern Puchong. The MRT line then enters the Sepang District, having 3 stops including two in Cyberjaya, before ending at Putrajaya Sentral, where it interchanges with the ERL KLIA Transit. Putrajaya Sentral is also the southernmost station in the Rapid KL rail network.

== History ==
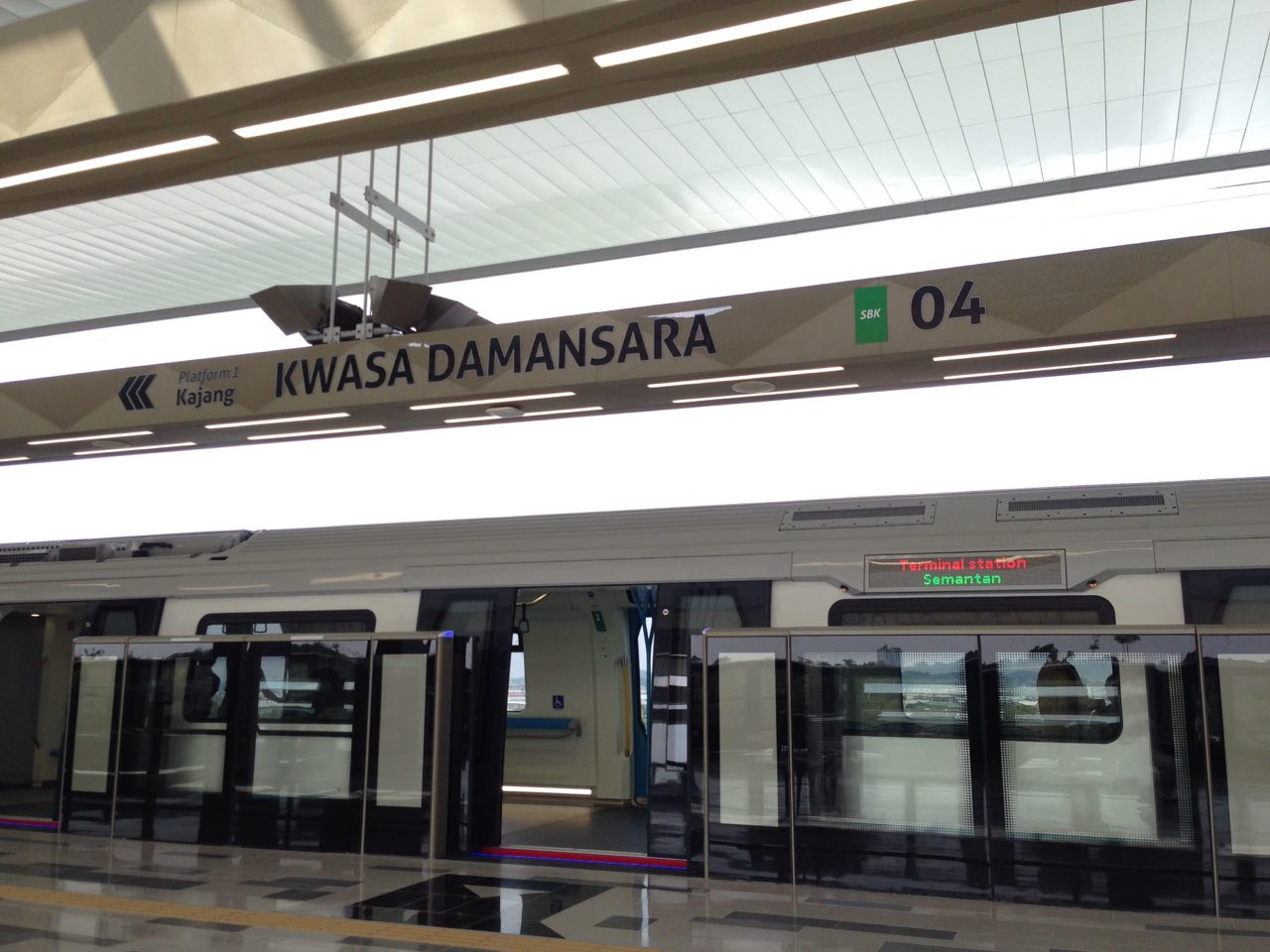
Kwasa Damansara cross-platform interchange station between the Kajang Line and Putrajaya Line

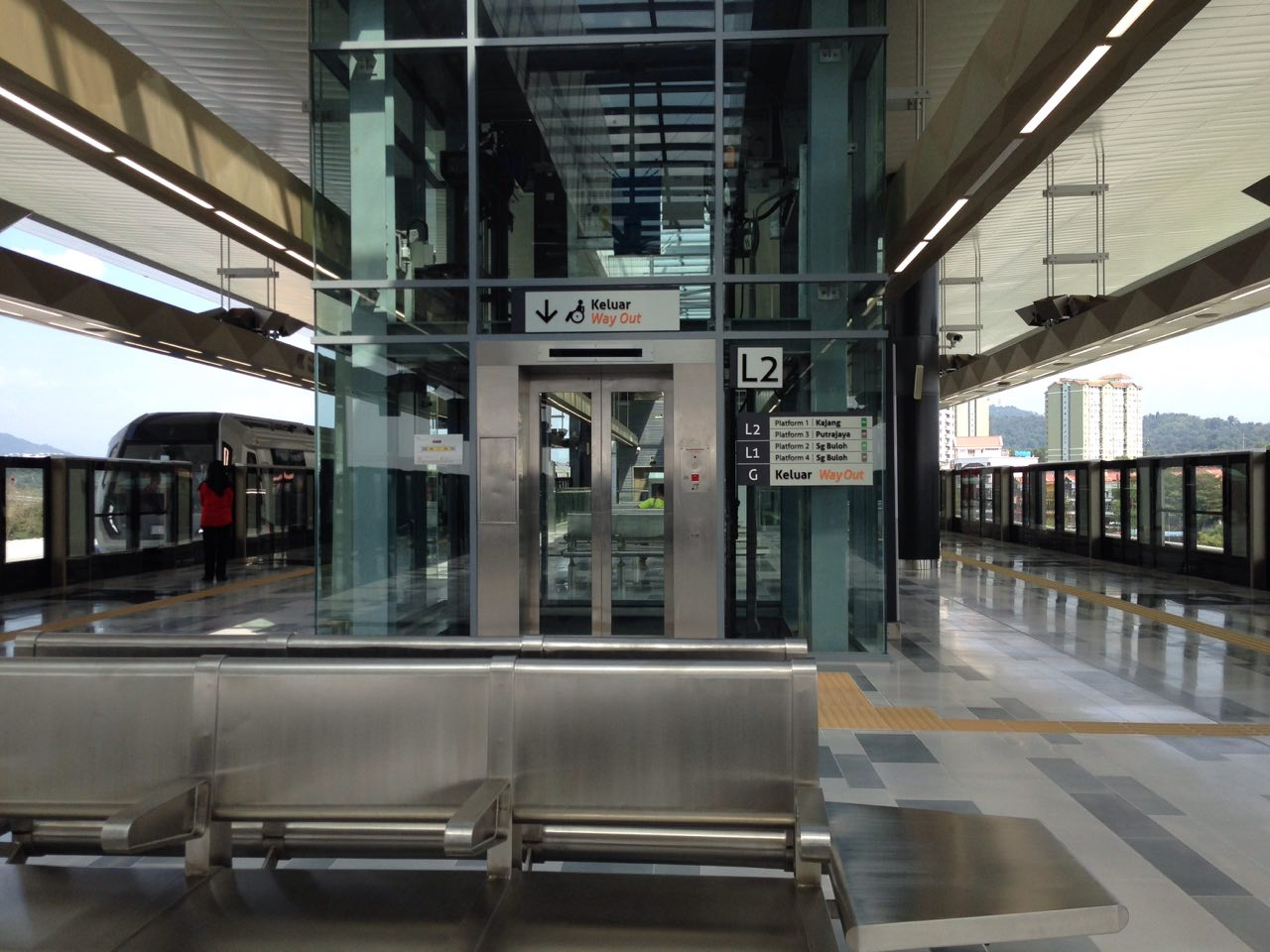
Kwasa Damansara station Level 2 island platform

=== Initial planning and construction ===
The MRT2 project was initially planned to be between Kuala Lumpur and Port Klang, similar to Shah Alam line's alignment. However, by October 2014, it was revised to be from Sungai Buloh, Selayang to Pandan.

The project was officially approved by the Federal government in March 2015 and allocated RM23 billion in the 2015 Budget and construction was expected to begin by November 2015. However, construction was delayed due to adjustments to the alignment to extend the line to Putrajaya and to provide connectivity to the proposed High Speed Rail project. Construction officially begun in September 2016 with a groundbreaking ceremony at the site of the future Putrajaya Sentral MRT station by former Prime Minister Dato' Seri Najib Tun Razak.

On 10 October 2017 at around 5pm, an explosion occurred at the Mass Rapid Transit (MRT) station construction site in Bandar Malaysia. According to the police, it was believed that the explosion happened because of an old unexploded bomb from World War II based on their initial investigation. Three Bangladeshi workers were seriously injured and two of them lost their legs while another suffered injuries on the hands and legs. One of the workers later succumbed to his injuries and died in the evening of the same day.

On 3 March 2018, a launching gantry at an MRT construction site in Jalan Jinjang (Work Package V203) collapsed. A construction worker died, while two others survived.

=== Project re-tender and cost cutting ===
After the fall of BN led Federal Government in May 2018, the new PH led Federal government, citing the mounting national debt and concerns with the direct negotiation tender process, proposed various cost-cutting measures to a lists of federal government projects, including the MRT2 project. In October 2018, then Finance Minister, Lim Guan Eng announced the decision to change the project structure as well as terminate the contract from MMC-Gamuda and re-tender the unfinished underground portion of the project by an open tender process, due to the fact the Federal Government and MMC-Gamuda have failed to reach an agreement relating to the underground portion of the construction project. This decision had caused a lot of protests from MMC-Gamuda and workers due to the fact that some 20,000 workers tend to lose their job. Due to budget concerns, and a re-tender, construction costs proposed by MMC-Gamuda is about half what it was previously. The construction of the two Bandar Malaysia stations has also been cancelled, and the stations were listed as provisional. The cost for the construction of the underground portion is now RM13.11 billion. This brought the total cost of the project to RM30.53 billion, down from RM39.35 billion previously. This means MMC-Gamuda has now secured the contract for the underground section and is allowed to continue the construction.

=== Phase 1 ===
By 3 April 2021, The Construction progress of Phase One section of the MRT Putrajaya Line (Kwasa Damansara – Kampung Batu) is at 97% and was planned to begin operations in August 2021. However, this was postponed multiple times due to the COVID-19 movement control order in Malaysia and that the line requires further testing. The MRT Putrajaya Line Phase 1 operations of the MRT Putrajaya Line was official launched by then Prime Minister Ismail Sabri Yaakob on 16 June 2022 at 3pm, along with 1 month of free rides for all public transportation services under RapidKL including the MRT.

=== Phase 2 ===
By 23 December 2022, the construction works of MRT Putrajaya Line Phase 2 were completed and the operational readiness phase was in progress. Because the tests could take longer than usual to pass, the opening date of Phase 2 was expected in March 2023, delayed two months from the original January 2023 deadline.

Phase 2 of the MRT Putrajaya Line was officially launched by Prime Minister Anwar Ibrahim at the Serdang Depot on 16 March 2023. Free rides for the MRT Putrajaya Line were also announced effective from 16 March 2023 until 31 March 2023.

The total cost of the project was RM56.93 billion.

== Station designs ==
=== Elevated station concepts ===
The proposed design for the elevated stations is based on the “Serambi” concept. This concept is focused on the inspiring interaction and communication at a foyer or entrance space of a house such as the entrance space at a traditional rumah kampung or rumah panjang. The design opted is a simple and timeless design, which is derived from various design concepts, including that of the Japanese zen concept. Other aspects include open space, natural lighting and ventilation, and natural visual effects via play of lighting and shadows.

Compared to the Kajang Line's elevated station design, the columns have been pushed to the sides of the station, giving the stations an open and airy feel.

=== Underground station concepts ===
Each of the underground stations will carry its own individual theme, similar to that of the Kajang Line stations. The proposed designs range from preserving the rustic, reflecting tidal rhythm, promoting well-being, resonating heritage, vibrancy, pulse of life, discovering culture, molding forms, inspired by nature to streamlined flow.

== List of stations ==
28 (23 elevated + 1 half-sunken + 4 underground) out of 35 stations (excluding the ones on the MRT Kajang Line) have feeder bus services.

Kwasa Damansara station, along with the adjoining Sungai Buloh and Kampung Selamat stations were previously built as part of the MRT Kajang Line. These three stations were annexed by the Putrajaya Line, thus making Kwasa Damansara the interchange station between the two MRT lines.

Station code	Station name	Images	Opening	Platform type	Position	Park & Ride	Connecting Bus Lines	Working Name	Interchange station	Notes	Theme
PY01	Kwasa Damansara		16 June 2022	Stacked Island	Elevated	✓	N/A	Kota Damansara	Northern terminus. Cross-platform interchange with KG04 Kajang Line.	Northern terminus of both the MRT Putrajaya Line and MRT Kajang Line.	
PY02	Rubber Research Institute (RRI)		-	-	-	-	-	RRI		Provisional station	
PY03	Kampung Selamat		16 June 2022	Side	Elevated	N/A	T104	Kampung Baru Sungai Buloh		Exit to D'Sara Sentral.	
PY04	Sungai Buloh		16 June 2022	Island	Elevated	✓	T100; T101; T102; T105; T154; T155	N/A	Connecting station with KA08 KTM Tanjung Malim-Port Klang Line and KTM ETS.		
Parallel crossover tracks
PY05	Damansara Damai		16 June 2022	Island	Elevated	N/A	T103	N/A			
PY06	Sri Damansara Barat		16 June 2022	Island	Elevated	✓	T106	Sri Damansara West			
PY07	Sri Damansara Sentral		16 June 2022	Side	Elevated	✓	T107; T108; T109	Sri Damansara East			
PY08	Sri Damansara Timur		16 June 2022	Island	Elevated	✓	T110 T113B; 801	Kepong Sentral	Connecting station with KA07 Kepong Sentral for the KTM Tanjung Malim-Port Klang Line and KTM ETS.		
PY09	Metro Prima		16 June 2022	Island	Elevated	✓	T112B; T113B; T114; T152; 801	Metro Prima		Feeder bus T112 to KA06 Kepong for the KTM Tanjung Malim-Port Klang Line. Exit to AEON Mall Metro Prima.	
Parallel crossover tracks
PY10	Kepong Baru		16 June 2022	Island	Elevated	N/A	T115	Kepong Baru			
PY11	Jinjang		16 June 2022	Island	Elevated	✓	GOKL 13; GOKL 12; T117	Jinjang			
PY12	Sri Delima		16 June 2022	Island	Elevated	N/A	CREAM; T118; T121	Seri Delima		Exit to Brem Mall Kepong.	
PY13	Kampung Batu		16 June 2022	Island	Elevated	✓	MAROON; T120; 173	Kampung Batu	Connecting station with KC03 KTM Batu Caves-Pulau Sebang Line.		
Parallel crossover tracks
PY14	Kentonmen		16 March 2023	Side	Elevated	✓	151; 173; T118B	Kentonmen		Walking distance to Bamboo Hills	
PY15	Jalan Ipoh		16 March 2023	Island	Half-sunken	N/A	T118B; 151; 173	Jalan Ipoh		Underground alignment begins after this station. Exit to Mutiara Complex.	
PY16	Sentul Barat		16 March 2023	Island	Underground	N/A	T180; 151; 173	Sentul West		Exit to the Kuala Lumpur Performing Arts Centre (KLPAC)	Preserving The Rustic
PY17	Titiwangsa	hkl	16 March 2023	Island	Underground	N/A	GOKL 04; GOKL 03; GOKL 05; 254; 302; 402	Titiwangsa	Interchange station with AG3 SP3 MR11 Ampang and Sri Petaling lines and KL Monorail; Proposed interchange with CC09 MRT Circle Line.		Tidal Rhythm
PY18	Hospital Kuala Lumpur		16 March 2023	Diverging Island	Underground	N/A	N/A	Hospital Kuala Lumpur			Promoting Well-Being
Underground parallel crossover tracks
PY19	Raja Uda–Institut Jantung Negara		16 March 2023	Island	Underground	N/A	220; 302; ORANGE	Kampung Baru North			Resonating Heritage
PY20	Ampang Park		16 March 2023	Stacked	Underground	N/A	303; 402	Ampang Park	Connecting station with KJ9 Kelana Jaya Line.	Exit to Intermark Mall.	Vibrancy
PY21	Persiaran KLCC		16 March 2023	Stacked	Underground	N/A	N/A	KLCC East		Exit to Ombak KLCC. 7 mins walk (700 m) to KJ10 KLCC for the Kelana Jaya Line via KLCC Park, with pedestrian access to Petronas Twin Towers, Suria KLCC, Avenue K and the Kuala Lumpur Convention Centre.	Pulse of Life
PY22	Conlay–Kompleks Kraf		16 March 2023	Island	Underground	N/A	N/A	Conlay		Exit the Kuala Lumpur Craft Complex and Kuala Lumpur Convention Centre. 15 mins walk to KJ10 KLCC via Kuala Lumpur Convention Centre (with further access to MR6 Bukit Bintang and MR7 Raja Chulan for the KL Monorail, and KG18A Bukit Bintang for the Kajang Line via a pedestrian walkway connecting the convention Centre and Pavilion Kuala Lumpur mall).	Discovering Culture
PY23	Tun Razak Exchange		16 March 2023	Stacked Island	Underground	N/A	T407	Tun Razak Exchange	Cross-platform interchange with KG20 Kajang Line.	Exit to The Exchange TRX and Exchange 106 Tower via an underground passageway.	Islamic Corporate
PY24	Chan Sow Lin		16 March 2023	Island	Underground	N/A	T418; T419; 580; 590	Chan Sow Lin	Interchange station with AG11 SP11 Ampang and Sri Petaling lines.		Moulding Forms
PY25	Bandar Malaysia Utara		-	-	Underground	N/A	N/A	Bandar Malaysia North		Provisional station	Inspired By Nature
PY26	Bandar Malaysia Selatan		-	-	Underground	N/A	N/A	Bandar Malaysia South		Provisional station	Streamlined Flow
PY27	Kuchai		16 March 2023	Island	Elevated	✓	T585; T586; T587; T588; 590	Kuchai Lama	Proposed interchange with CC28 MRT Circle Line		
PY28	Taman Naga Emas		16 March 2023	Island	Elevated	✓	T589	Taman Naga Emas			
Parallel crossover tracks
PY29	Sungai Besi		16 March 2023	Side	Elevated	✓	590; T559; T560	Sungai Besi	Interchange station with SP16 Sri Petaling Line.		
PY30	Taman Teknologi		16 March 2023	-	-	-	-	Technology Park		Provisional station	
PY31	Serdang Raya Utara		16 March 2023	Island	Elevated	✓	T561; T562; T563	Serdang Raya North		Exit to One South	
PY32	Serdang Raya Selatan		16 March 2023	Island	Elevated	✓		Serdang Raya South		Exit to South City Plaza	
PY33	Serdang Jaya		16 March 2023	Island	Elevated	N/A	540; T565; T569; SJ04	Seri Kembangan		Feeder Bus T569 to KG30 Batu 11 Cheras for the MRT Kajang Line. Feeder bus T565 KB05 Serdang for the KTM Batu Caves-Pulau Sebang Line.	
PY34	UPM		16 March 2023	Island	Elevated	✓	T566; T567; T568	UPM		Exit to Universiti Putra Malaysia (UPM), with feeder bus T567 to Faculty of Engineering and bus T568 to rest of campus. Nearest station to IOI City Mall, access available via Trek Rides UPM-Serdang DRT service.	
Parallel crossover tracks
PY35	Taman Universiti		-	Side	-	N/A	N/A	Taman Universiti		Provisional station	
PY36	Taman Equine		16 March 2023	Island	Elevated	✓	540; T542; T543	Equine Park			
PY37	Putra Permai		16 March 2023	Island	Elevated	N/A	T544; T545	Taman Putra Permai		Feeder Bus T545 to SP28 Puchong Perdana for the Sri Petaling Line.	
PY38	16 Sierra		16 March 2023	Island	Elevated	N/A	✓	16 Sierra			
PY39	Cyberjaya Utara–Finexus		16 March 2023	Island	Elevated	✓	T504; T505	Cyberjaya North		Bus to D'Pulze Shopping Centre, City University, Multimedia University, and Hospital Cyberjaya via feeder bus T505.	
PY40	Cyberjaya City Centre		16 March 2023	Island	Elevated	N/A	T506; T507	N/A		Walking distance to Limkokwing University	
Parallel crossover tracks											
PY41; KT3	Putrajaya Sentral		16 March 2023	Island	Elevated	✓	T508; T509; T510; T511; T512; P108; T523	Putrajaya Sentral	Southern terminus. Connecting station with KT3 ERL KLIA Transit.	Bus to IOI City Mall via bus route T523.	

== Rolling stock ==
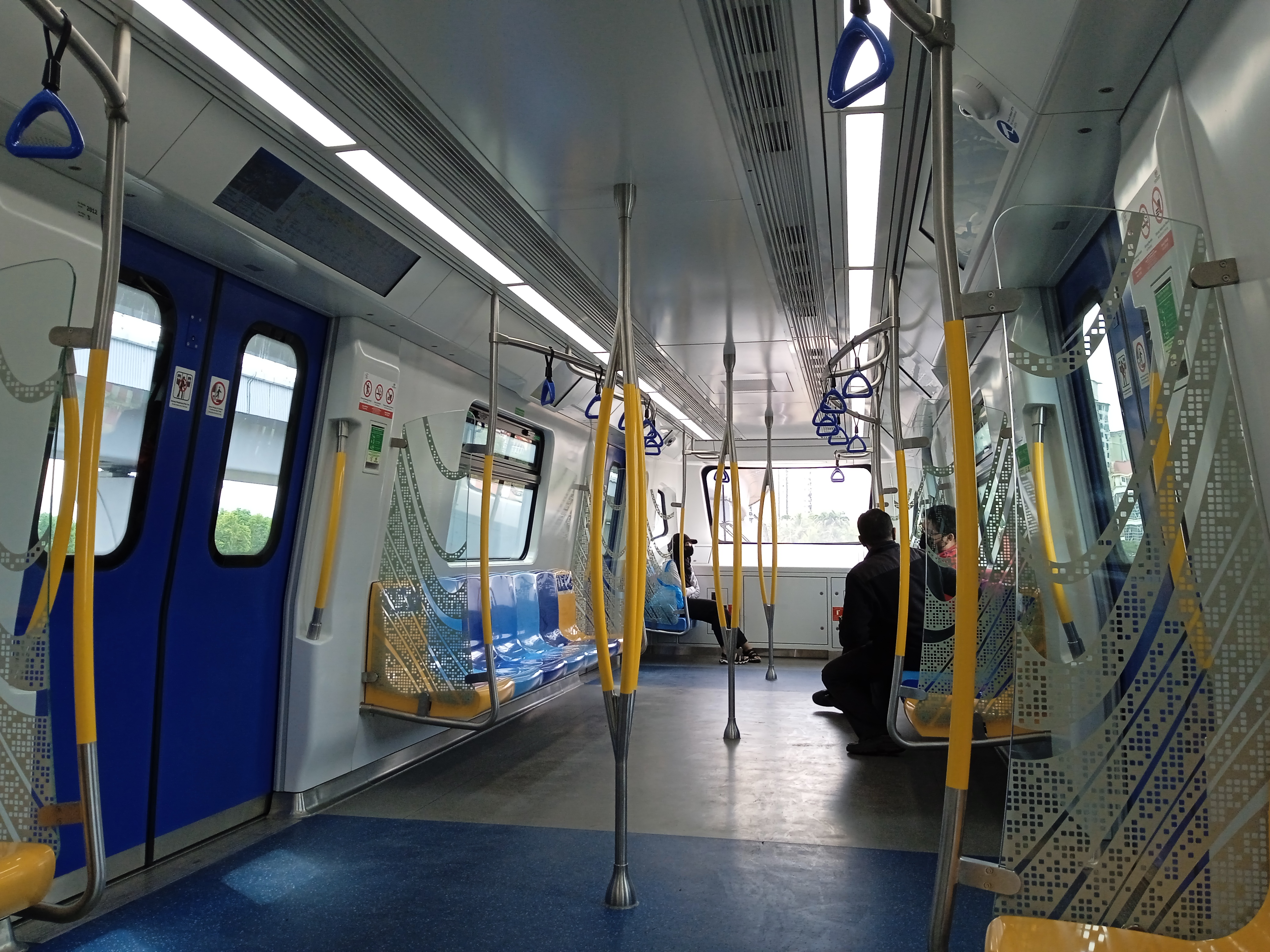
Interior of MRT Putrajaya Line train

The rolling stock is provided by HAP Consortium which consists of Hyundai Rotem, Apex Communications and POSCO Engineering. The trains are fully automatic with a capacity of 1,200 passengers in a 4-car trainsets formation.

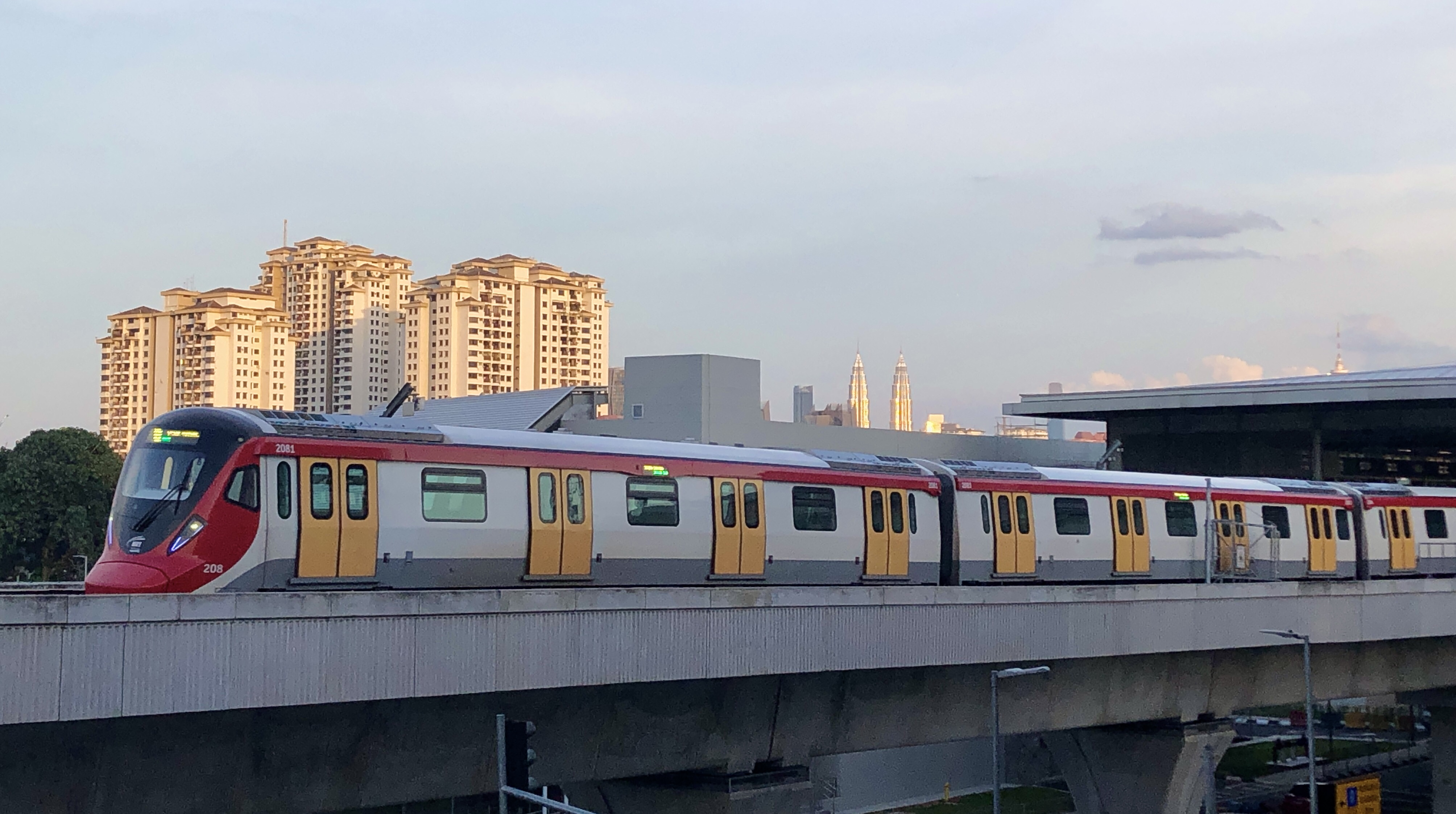
Hyundai Rotem EMU departing Kentonmen

The 4-car trainsets are maintained at 2 purpose-built facilities, Sungai Buloh and Serdang depot, located nearby Kwasa Damansara and the proposed Taman Universiti stations respectively.

Traction power supply of train: 750 V DC, Third Rail

The whole line has 49 4-car train sets and has 40 trains in operation in peak hours making a 4 minute frequency

The front and back of the trainsets resemble a duck's bill, which is why they are called "Ducky".

=== Formation ===
The train consists of four cars, with car 1 facing towards Kwasa Damansara and car 2 facing towards Putrajaya Sentral.

Set designation	1	3	4	2
Formation	Motor Car	Trailer Car	Trailer Car	Motor Car

== Ridership ==
MRT Putrajaya Line Ridership
Year	Month/Quarter	Ridership	Annual Ridership	Change (%)	Notes
2026	Q4	5,330,440	49,501,921		As of October 2026
2026	Q3	15,524,475	49,501,921		
2026	Q2	14,759,331	49,501,921		
2026	Q1	13,887,675	49,501,921		
2025	Q4	14,504,106	55,670,064	▲15.7	
2025	Q3	14,706,993	55,670,064	▲15.7	
2025	Q2	13,680,934	55,670,064	▲15.7	
2025	Q1	12,778,031	55,670,064	▲15.7	
2024	Q4	13,300,744	48,126,110	▲62.8	
2024	Q3	12,713,690	48,126,110	▲62.8	
2024	Q2	11,349,890	48,126,110	▲62.8	
2024	Q1	10,761,786	48,126,110	▲62.8	
2023	Q4	10,244,894	29,555,851	▲612.6	PY13 Kampung Batu – PY41 Putrajaya Sentral section opened on 16 March 2023
2023	Q3	8,868,780	29,555,851	▲612.6	
2023	Q2	7,223,564	29,555,851	▲612.6	
2023	Q1	3,218,613	29,555,851	▲612.6	
2022	Q4	1,904,804	4,147,577	-	
2022	Q3	1,873,209	4,147,577	-	
2022	Q2	369,564	4,147,577	-	PY01 Kwasa Damansara – PY13 Kampung Batu section opened on 16 June 2022
2022	Q1	-	4,147,577	-	

== Criticism ==
Inaccessibility of stations and inadequate first and last mile connectivity has been criticized by potential users of the new MRT line - a problem which has already led to lower than expected ridership on other public transport lines in the Klang Valley. For example, the Cyberjaya stations are located far away from the main town centre.

== Gallery ==
Kwasa Damansara Levels signage

Banner of Launch of the "Keluarga Malaysia" MRT Putrajaya Line Phase 1 operations, along with 1 month of free rides for all public transportation services in Klang Valley

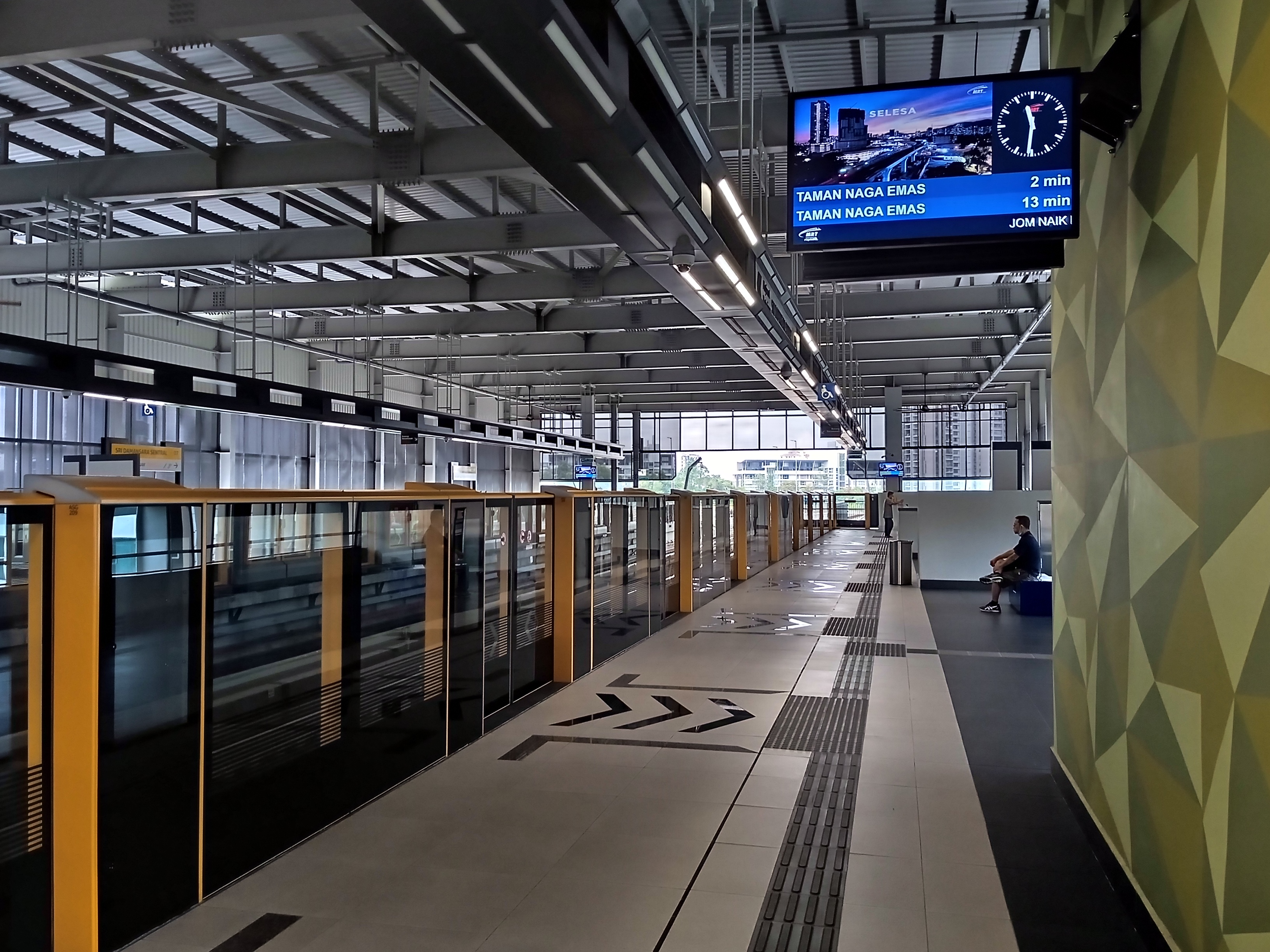
All stations are fitted with Platform Screen Doors (PSD), as seen here at Sri Damansara Sentral station.

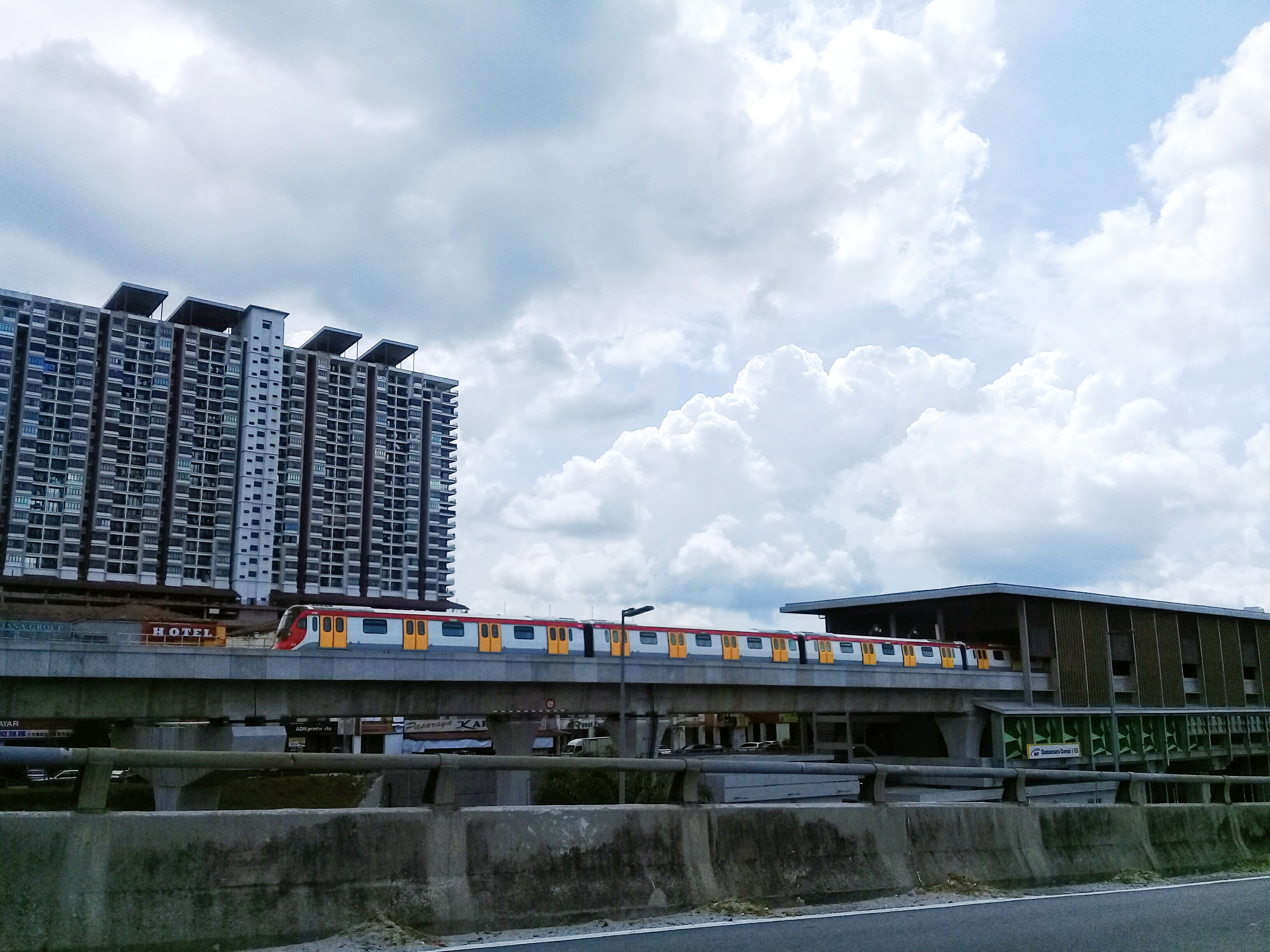
A Hyundai Rotem EMU is departing from the Damansara Damai MRT station

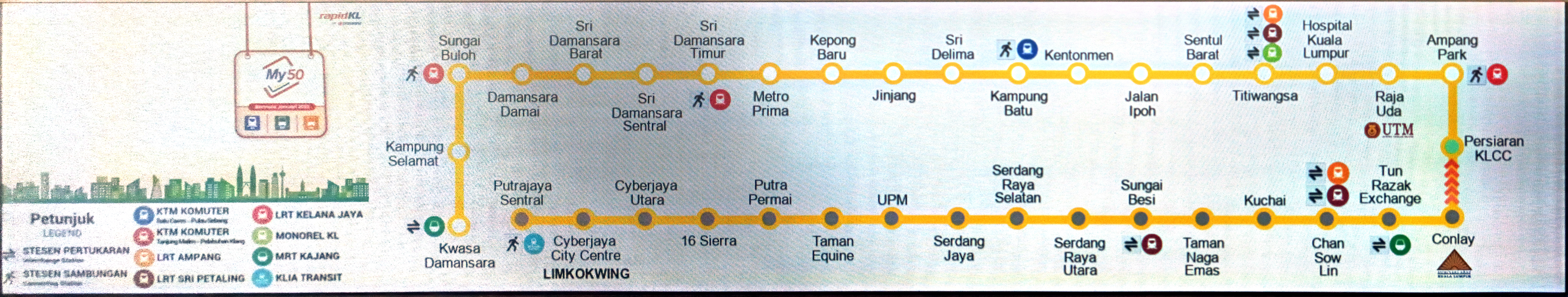
A Dynamic Route Map Display (DRMD) showing the train on its way to Persiaran KLCC
