= Damansara Damai MRT station =

Metro station in Selangor, Malaysia

Coordinates: 3°11′59.6″N 101°35′33.3″E

PY05 Damansara Damai
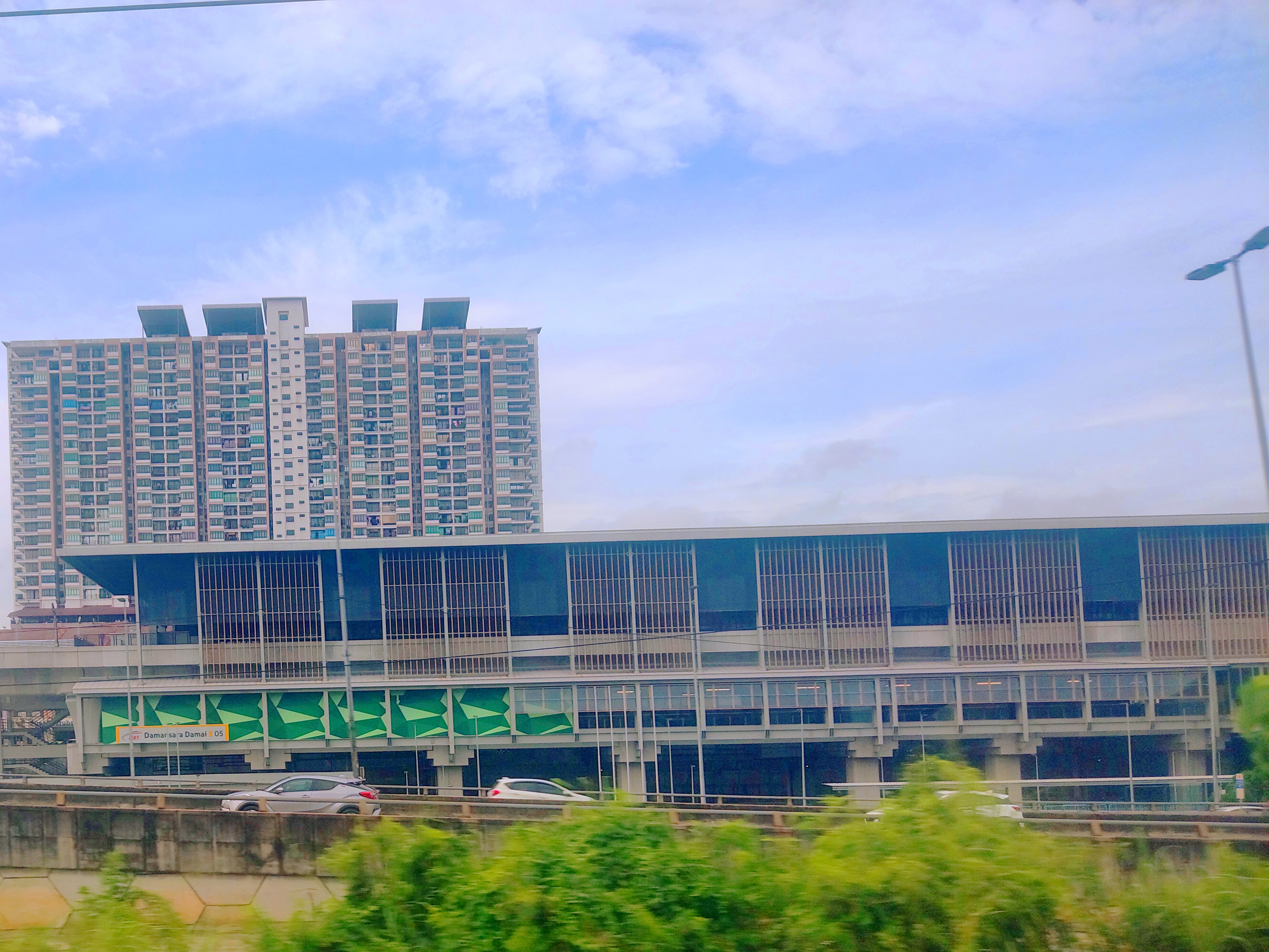

General information
- Other names: Malay: دامنسارا داماي (Jawi); Chinese: 白沙罗达迈; Tamil: டாமன்சாரா டாமாய்
- Location: Jalan PJU 10/2A (off Jalan Kuala Selangor), Damansara Damai, PJU 10, 47830 Petaling Jaya; Selangor; Malaysia
- System: Rapid KL
- Owner: MRT Corp
- Operator: Rapid Rail
- Line: 12 Putrajaya Line
- Platforms: 1 island platform
- Tracks: 2

Construction
- Structure type: Elevated
- Parking: Unavailable
- Accessible: Yes

Other information
- Status: Operational
- Station code: PY05

History
- Opened: 16 June 2022; 4 years ago

Services
Preceding station		Following station
Sungai Buloh towards Kwasa Damansara	Putrajaya Line	Sri Damansara Barat towards Putrajaya Sentral
Location

The Damansara Damai MRT station is a mass rapid transit (MRT) station in the suburb of Damansara Damai in Petaling Jaya, Selangor, Malaysia. It is one of the stations on the MRT Putrajaya Line. It opened on 16 June 2022 under Phase One operations of the line.

== Location ==
The station is located along the Kepong-Kuala Selangor highway.

== Station layout ==
The station is elevated with an island platform.
