= Sri Damansara Sentral MRT station =

Metro station in Selangor, Malaysia

PY07 Sri Damansara Sentral

General information
- Other names: Malay: سري دامنسارا سينترل (Jawi); Chinese: 斯里白沙罗中环; Tamil: செரி டாமன்சாரா சென்ட்ரல்
- Location: Persiaran Dagang, Bandar Sri Damansara, PJU9, 52200 Petaling Jaya; Selangor; Malaysia
- Coordinates: 3°11′55″N 101°37′16.6″E
- System: Rapid KL
- Owner: MRT Corp
- Operator: Rapid Rail
- Line: 12 Putrajaya Line
- Platforms: 2 side platforms
- Tracks: 2

Construction
- Parking: Available, paid parking
- Accessible: Yes

Other information
- Status: Operational
- Station code: PY07

History
- Opened: 16 June 2022; 4 years ago

Services
Preceding station		Following station
Sri Damansara Barat towards Kwasa Damansara	Putrajaya Line	Sri Damansara Timur towards Putrajaya Sentral
Location

The Sri Damansara Sentral MRT station is a mass rapid transit (MRT) station in the suburb of Bandar Sri Damansara in Petaling Jaya, Selangor, Malaysia.

It is one of the stations on the MRT Putrajaya Line. The station began operations on 16 June 2022 as part of Phase One operations of the line.

== Location ==
Platform of the station

The station is next to the meeting point of the Kepong-Kuala Selangor highway, the Kuala Lumpur Middle Ring Road 2 (MRR2) and the Damansara-Puchong Expressway (LDP).

The station is also located close to Bandar Menjalara and Desa Park City across the Selangor-Kuala Lumpur border.

== Station features ==
- Elevated station with two side platforms
- Park & Ride
