= Sri Damansara Timur MRT station =

Mass rapid transit station

PY08 Sri Damansara Timur

General information
- Other names: Malay: سري دامنسارا تيمور (Jawi); Chinese: 斯里白沙罗东; Tamil: செரி டாமன்சாரா தீமோர்
- Location: Bandar Sri Damansara, PJU 9, 52200 Petaling Jaya; Selangor; Malaysia
- System: Rapid KL
- Owner: MRT Corp
- Operator: Rapid Rail
- Line: 12 Putrajaya Line
- Platforms: 1 island platform
- Tracks: 2
- Connections: Connecting station to KA07 Kepong Sentral for KTM Komuter and KTM ETS

Construction
- Parking: Available
- Accessible: Yes

Other information
- Status: Operational
- Station code: PY08

History
- Opened: 16 June 2022; 4 years ago

Services
Preceding station		Following station
Sri Damansara Sentral towards Kwasa Damansara	Putrajaya Line	Metro Prima towards Putrajaya Sentral
Location

The Sri Damansara Timur MRT station) is a mass rapid transit (MRT) station in the township of Bandar Sri Damansara in Damansara, Selangor, Malaysia. It is one of the stations on the MRT Putrajaya Line.

The station began operations on 16 June 2022, as part of Phase One operations of the Putrajaya Line.

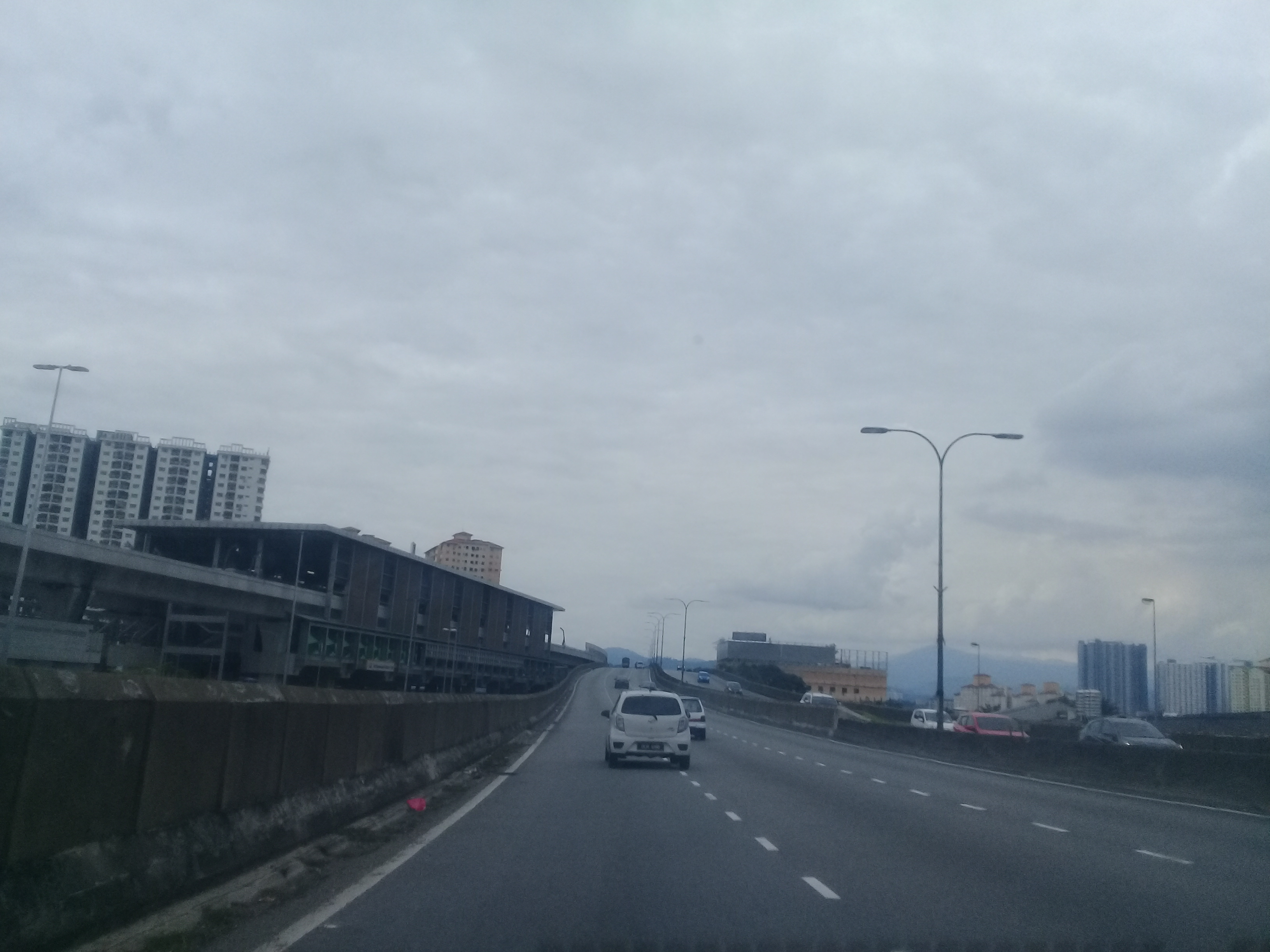
The MRT station as seen from the MRR2.

== Location ==
The station is located next to the Kuala Lumpur Middle Ring Road 2 (MRR2), next to the Selangor-Federal Territory border.

The station is also located near the tripoint of three local authorities: the Petaling Jaya City Council (MBPJ), Selayang Municipal Council (MPS) and Kuala Lumpur City Hall (DBKL).

== Station features ==
- Elevated station with an island platform
- Park & Ride

== Connection with KTM station ==
The station is located next to and is designated as a connecting station on official transit maps with the Kepong Sentral station, which is served by KTM Komuter's Tanjung Malim-Port Klang Line and KTM ETS.
