= Sri Damansara Barat MRT station =

Metro station in Selangor, Malaysia

PY06 Sri Damansara Barat
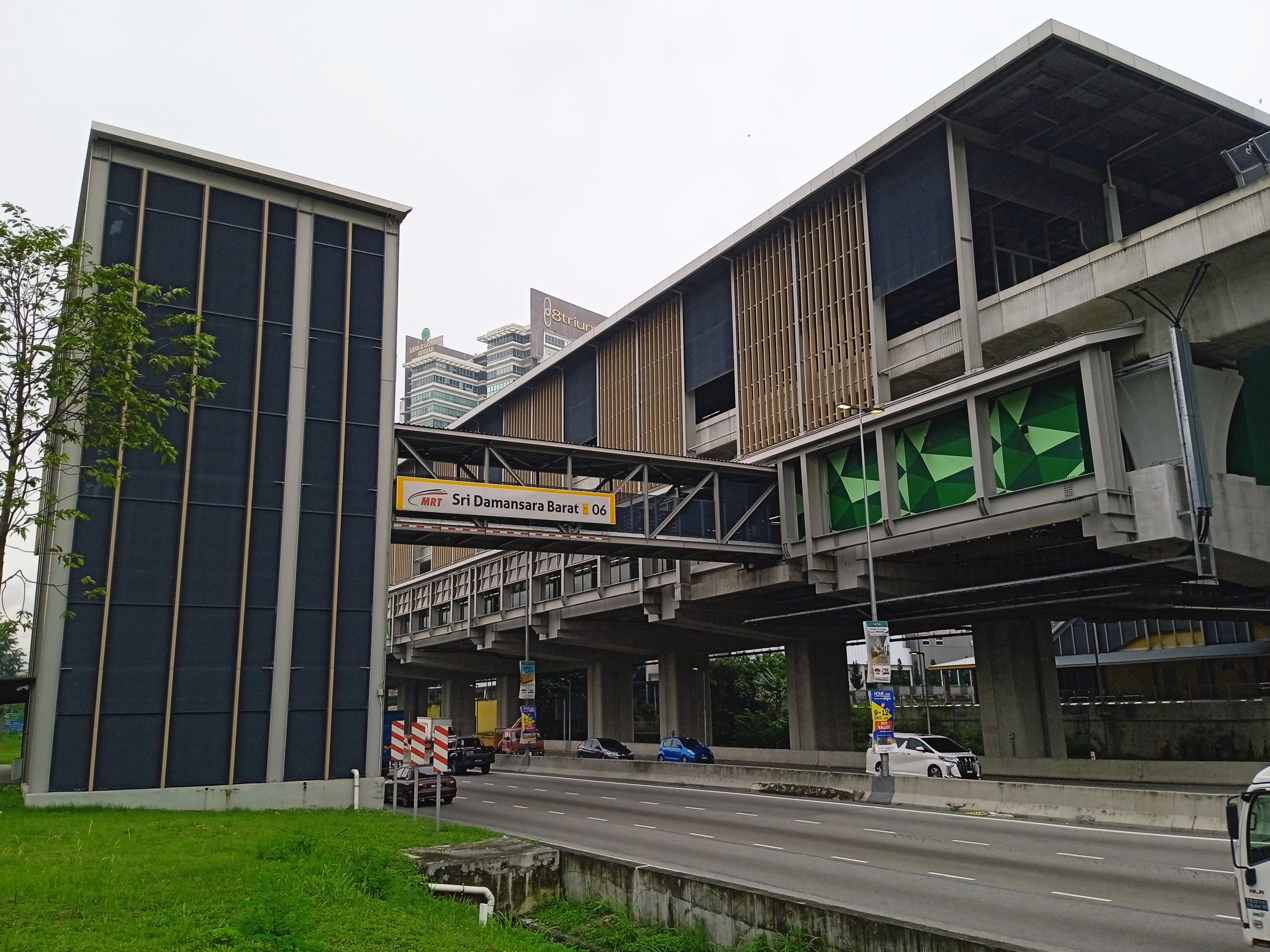
- View of the station from Jalan Kuala Selangor.

General information
- Other names: Malay: سري دامنسارا بارت (Jawi); Chinese: 斯里白沙罗西; Tamil: செரி டாமன்சாரா பாராட்
- Location: Off Jalan Kuala Selangor, Bandar Sri Damansara, PJU 9, 52200 Petaling Jaya; Selangor; Malaysia
- System: Rapid KL
- Owner: MRT Corp
- Operator: Rapid Rail
- Line: 12 Putrajaya Line
- Platforms: 1 island platform
- Tracks: 2

Construction
- Parking: Available with payment. 414 parking bays, 44 motorcycle bays.
- Accessible: Yes

Other information
- Status: Operational
- Station code: PY06

History
- Opened: 16 June 2022; 4 years ago

Services
Preceding station		Following station
Damansara Damai towards Kwasa Damansara	Putrajaya Line	Sri Damansara Sentral towards Putrajaya Sentral
Location

The Sri Damansara Barat MRT station is a mass rapid transit (MRT) station in the suburb of Bandar Sri Damansara in Petaling Jaya, Selangor, Malaysia. It is one of the stations on the MRT Putrajaya Line.

The station opened on 16 June 2022 as part of Phase One operations of the MRT line.

== Location ==
The station is located on the Kepong-Kuala Selangor Highway, along the banks of the Buloh River.

The station has two entrances. Entrance A is located on Jalan Cempaka SD 12/5 while Entrance B is located on Persiaran Industri.

== Station features ==
- Elevated station with an island platform.
- Park & Ride
