= Sungai Besi station =

Railway station in Kuala Lumpur, Malaysia

SP16 PY29 Sungai Besi
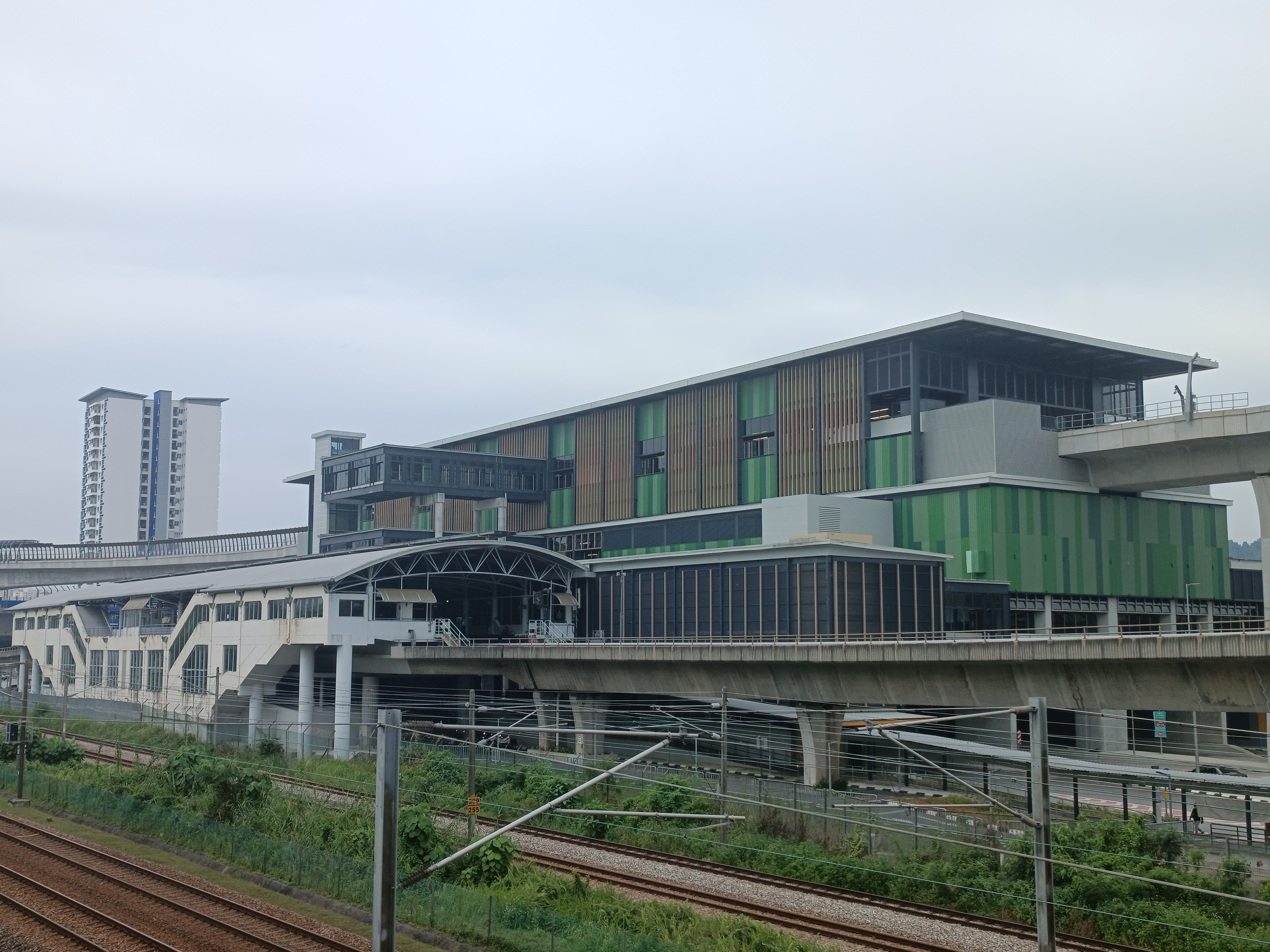
- View of the station from the Sungai Besi Expressway

General information
- Other names: Malay: سوڠاي بسي (Jawi); Chinese: 新街场; Tamil: சுங்கை பீசி
- Location: Jalan Sungai Besi, Sungai Besi; 57000 Kuala Lumpur; Malaysia
- Coordinates: 3°3′50″N 101°42′28″E
- System: Rapid KL
- Owner: Prasarana Malaysia (LRT); MRT Corp (MRT)
- Operator: Rapid Rail
- Lines: 4 Sri Petaling Line; 12 Putrajaya Line
- Platforms: 2 side platforms (LRT); 2 side platforms (MRT)
- Tracks: 2 (LRT); 2 (MRT)

Construction
- Structure type: Elevated
- Parking: None
- Accessible: Yes

Other information
- Station code: SP16 PY29

History
- Opened: 16 December 1996; 29 years ago (LRT); 16 March 2023; 3 years ago (MRT)

Services
Preceding station		Following station
Bandar Tasik Selatan towards Sentul Timur	Sri Petaling Line	Bukit Jalil towards Putra Heights
Taman Naga Emas towards Kwasa Damansara	Putrajaya Line	Serdang Raya Utara towards Putrajaya Sentral
Location

Sungai Besi station is an elevated integrated metro station in Sungai Besi, a town in the city of Kuala Lumpur, Malaysia. The station is served by the LRT Sri Petaling line and MRT Putrajaya Line, and is located at the junctions of the Sungai Besi Expressway between Exit 905 (to Jalan Sungai Besi/Kuala Lumpur Middle Ring Road 2) and Exit 906 (to Shah Alam Expressway).

== Station details ==
=== Location ===
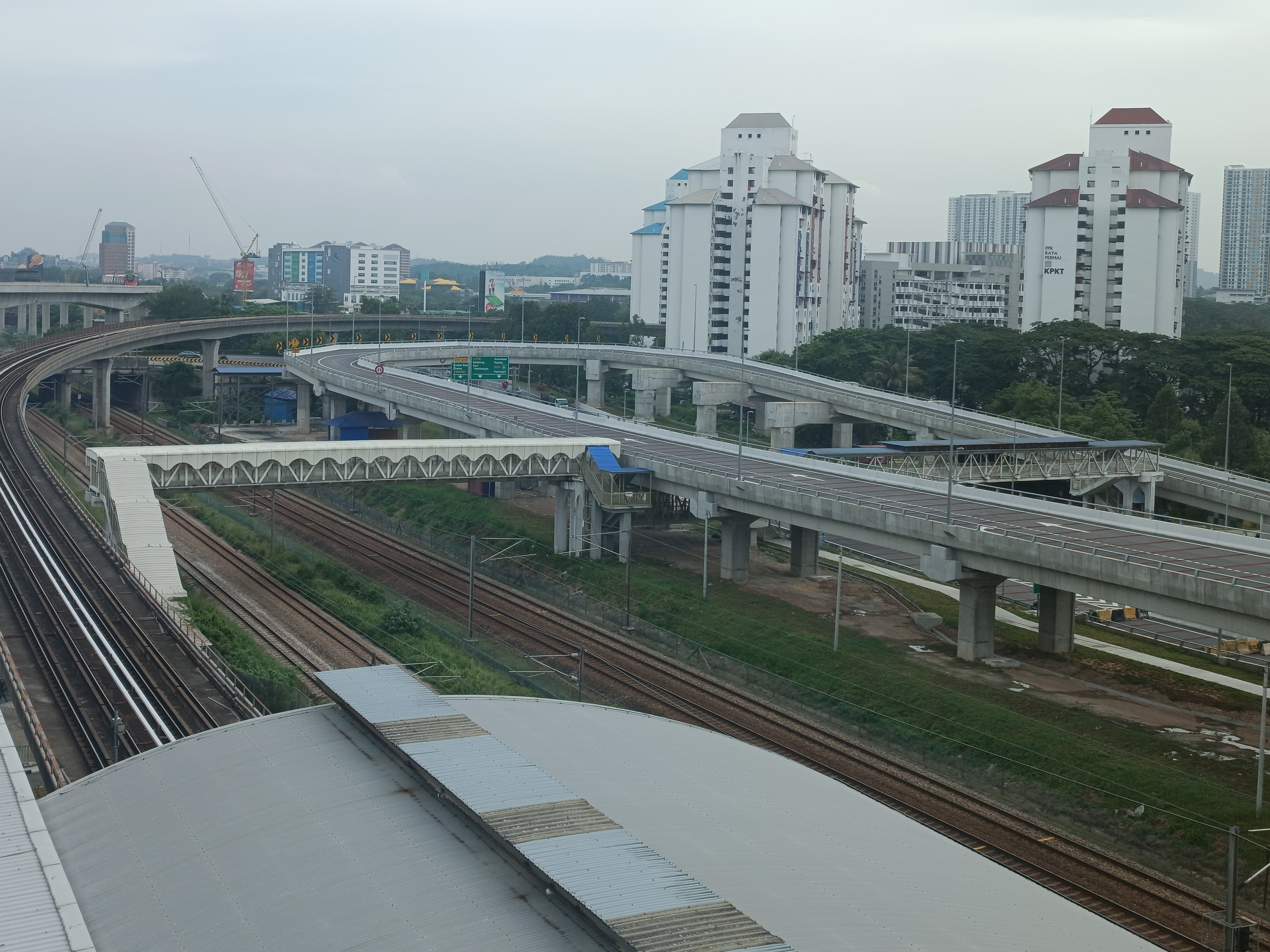
Linkbridge across ERL, KTM tracks and Sungai Besi Expressway

The station is located on Jalan Sungai Besi next to Pekan Sungai Besi and is accessible from Pangsapuri Permai and PPR Raya Permai via a link bridge.

=== LRT Sri Petaling Line ===
Sri Petaling Line platforms

The Sungai Besi LRT station was opened in 1996, along with 17 other LRT stations along the light rapid transit (LRT) line. The principal styling of the LRT station is similar to most other stations in the line, featuring multi-tiered roofs supported by latticed frames, and white plastered walls and pillars.

=== MRT Putrajaya Line ===
Putrajaya Line platforms

The Sungai Besi MRT station was opened on 16 March 2023, along with 23 other stations from Kentonmen to Putrajaya Sentral on the mass rapid transit (MRT) line.

The station is one of five stations in the Klang Valley that provide an interchange between two elevated rapid transit lines, the others being Titiwangsa, Putra Heights, Bandar Utama and Kwasa Damansara. It is also one of the four stations on the Putrajaya Line to have side platforms, as most stations on the line have island platforms.

== Planned interchange ==
The station is planned to be an interchange with the proposed Maju KL Komuter station that will be served by KTM Komuter's Batu Caves–Pulau Sebang Line.
