= Serdang Raya Utara MRT station =

Metro station in Selangor, Malaysia

PY31 Serdang Raya Utara
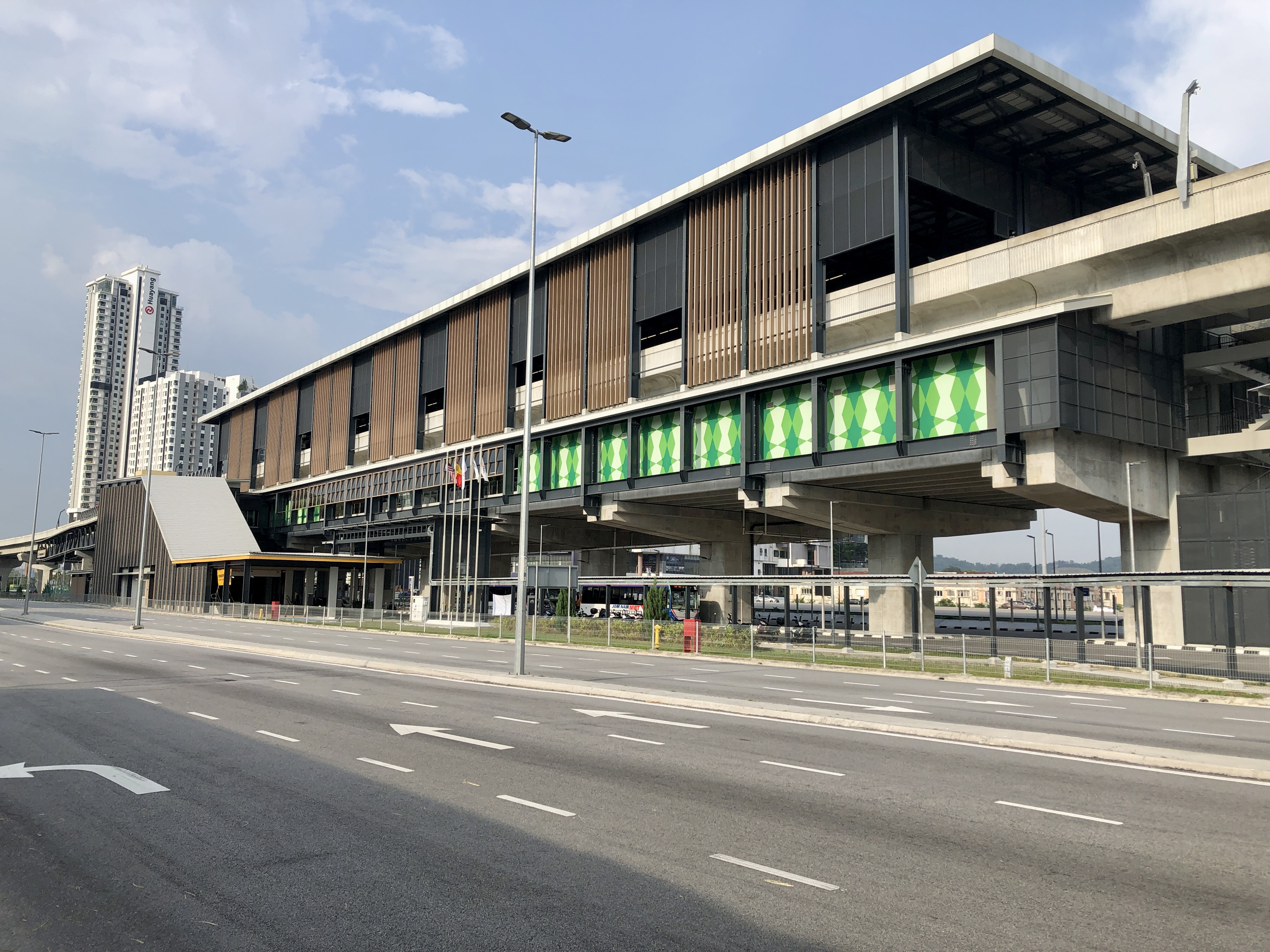

General information
- Other names: Malay: سردڠ راي اوتارا (Jawi); Chinese: 沙登拉也北; Tamil: செர்டாங் ராயா உத்தாரா
- Location: Jalan Utama, Taman Serdang Raya, 43300 Seri Kembangan; Selangor; Malaysia
- Coordinates: 3.0417°N 101.7048°E
- System: Rapid KL
- Owner: MRT Corp
- Operator: Rapid Rail
- Line: 12 Putrajaya Line
- Platforms: 1 island platform
- Tracks: 2

Construction
- Parking: Available
- Accessible: Yes

Other information
- Status: Operational
- Station code: PY31

History
- Opened: 16 March 2023; 3 years ago

Services
Preceding station		Following station
Sungai Besi towards Kwasa Damansara	Putrajaya Line	Serdang Raya Selatan towards Putrajaya Sentral
Location

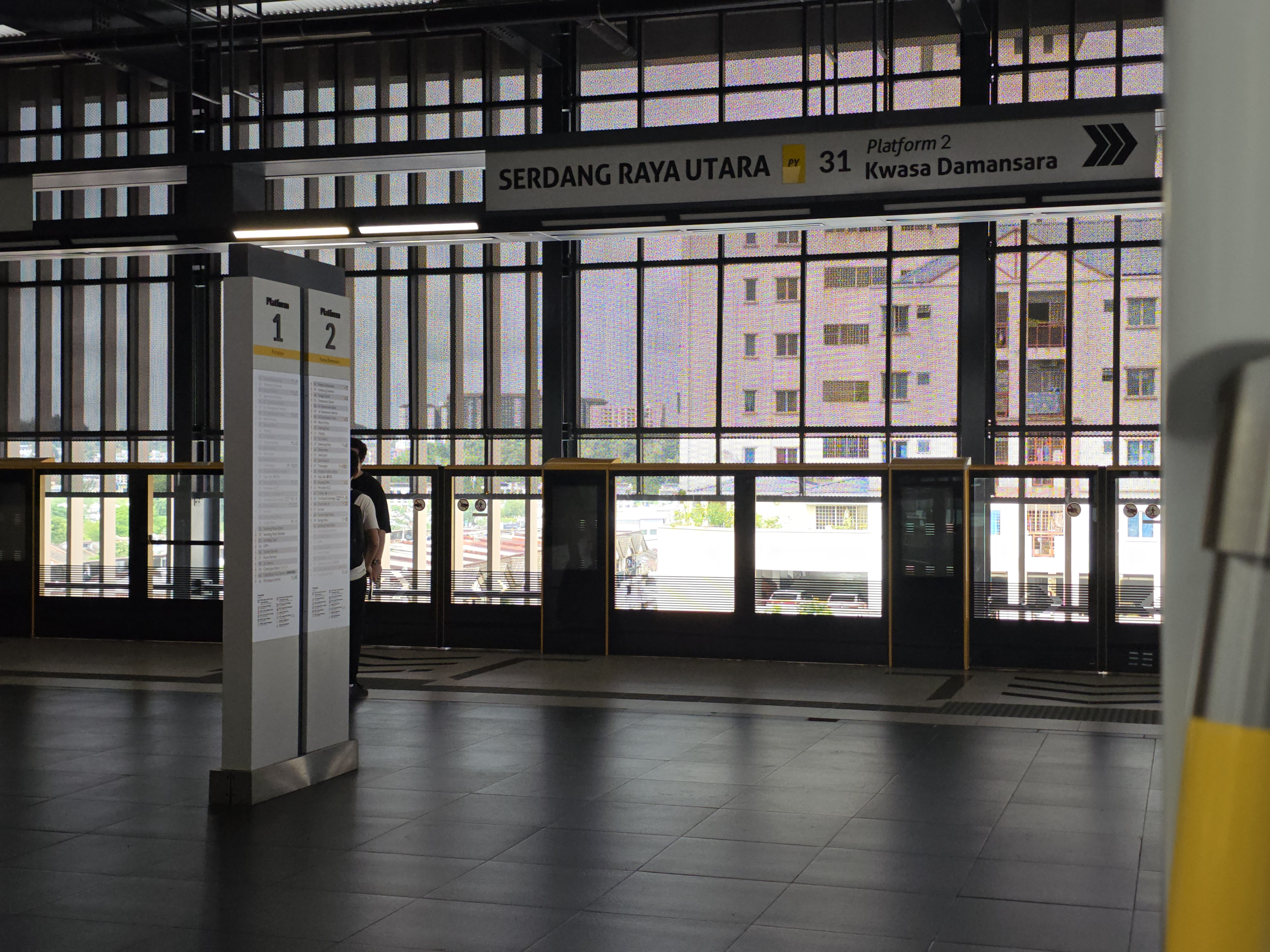
Serdang Raya Utara MRT platform level

The Serdang Raya Utara MRT station is a mass rapid transit (MRT) station in Seri Kembangan, Selangor, Malaysia. It is one of the stations on the MRT Putrajaya Line.

The station was opened to the public on 16 March 2023.

== Station details ==
=== Location ===
The station is next to the Sungai Besi toll plaza, where the paid zone of the PLUS toll road begins.

=== Exits and entrances ===
The station has a total of two entrances. Entrance A is located near Taman Serdang Raya 6 (or Serdang Raya 6), Taman Serdang Raya 7 (or Serdang Jaya 7) and Taman Serdang Raya 9 (or Serdang Raya 9), while Entrance B is located near One South and Taman Serdang Perdana. Feeder bus services stop at the bus stop located at Entrance A of the station.

Putrajaya Line station
Entrance	Location	Destination	Picture
A	Jalan Utama	Park and Ride, feeder bus stop, taxi and e-hailing layby, Jalan Utama (east side), Taman Serdang Raya 6, Taman Serdang Raya 7, Taman Serdang Raya 9, Plaza Serdang Raya, Masjid Al-Islah Serdang Raya, Taman Putra Indah	
B	Jalan One South (OS)	Taxi and e-hailing layby, Jalan OS (south side), Flexis One South, One South Condominiums, Cube One South, ZETA Residences One South, Residensi Flora One South, Park @ One South, Garden @ One South, Taman Serdang Perdana	

== Bus Services ==
=== Feeder bus service ===
Route No.	Origin	Desitination	Via	Connecting to
T561	PY31 Serdang Raya Utara (Entrance A)	The Park, Bukit Serdang	Jalan SR 6/1; Jalan SR 7/2; Jalan PBS 14/1; Jalan BS 11/14; Jalan Kasturi; Jalan Cemara	SJ05

=== Discontinued Lines ===
T562 and T563 were part of the 19 bus routes in the Klang Valley that were discontinued and replaced by Rapid KL on-Demand routes on 16 January 16 2026. Low ridership was cited as the reason for their termination.

Route No.	Origin	Desitination	Via	Connected to	Terminated
T562	PY31 Serdang Raya Utara (Entrance A)	Serdang Perdana	Jalan Utama; PY32 Serdang Raya Selatan Entrance A Persiaran Serdang Perdana	T564	January 16, 2026
T563	PY31 Serdang Raya Utara (Entrance A)	SP17 Bukit Jalil	Jalan Utama; FT 217 Bukit Jalil Highway; Technology Park Malaysia; Jalan Barat; Jalan Merah Caga; Shah Alam Expressway; SP18 Sri Petaling; Bukit Jalil National Stadium; Bukit Jalil Sports School	652, T580, T582	January 16, 2026

== Nearby ==
- One South
- Selangor Turf Club
- Plaza Serdang Raya
- Masjid Al-Islah Serdang Raya
- Pangsapuri Mutiara Subang
- Pangsapuri Seri Siantan
- Serdang Skyvilla
