= Kepong Sentral station =

Railway station in Bandar Sri Damansara, Malaysia

Coordinates: 3°12′31″N 101°37′42″E

Kepong Sentral

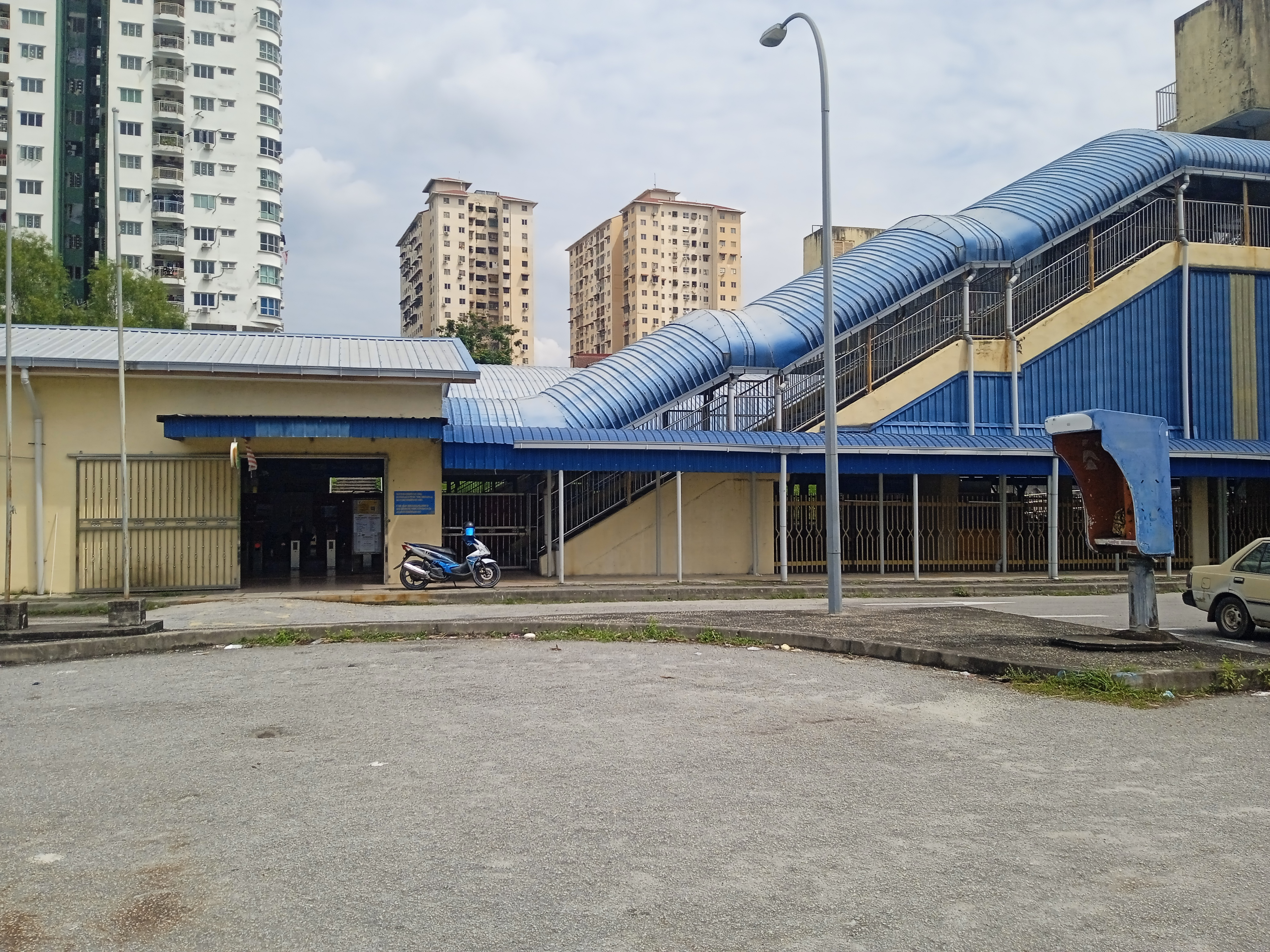

General information
- Other names: Malay: کڤوڠ سينترل (Jawi); Chinese: 甲洞中环; Tamil: கெப்போங் சென்ட்ரல்
- Location: Kepong, Kuala Lumpur, Malaysia
- System: KA07 Commuter rail and Inter-city rail station
- Owner: Keretapi Tanah Melayu (KTM)
- Operator: Keretapi Tanah Melayu (KTM)
- Line: West Coast Line
- Platforms: 2 side platforms
- Tracks: 2
- Connections: Connecting station to PY08 Sri Damansara Timur for Putrajaya Line

Construction
- Parking: Available
- Accessible: Yes

Other information
- Station code: KA07

History
- Opened: KA07 1 July 2006

Services
Preceding station	Keretapi Tanah Melayu (Komuter)	Following station
Sungai Buloh towards Tanjung Malim	Tanjung Malim–Port Klang Line	Kepong towards Port Klang
Preceding station	Keretapi Tanah Melayu (ETS)	Following station
Sungai Buloh towards Ipoh	KL Sentral–Ipoh (Gold)	Kuala Lumpur towards Kuala Lumpur Sentral
Former services
Preceding station	Keretapi Tanah Melayu (ETS)	Following station
Former ETS service terminated on 1 January 2026
Sungai Buloh towards Ipoh	KL Sentral–Ipoh (Silver)	Kuala Lumpur towards Kuala Lumpur Sentral
Location

The Kepong Sentral KTM station is a railway station located in Kepong, Kuala Lumpur, Malaysia. It is served by KTM ETS's Gold Service on the KL Sentral-Ipoh route, and KTM Komuter's Tanjung Malim–Port Klang Line. Situated just beside this station is the Kuala Lumpur Middle Ring Road 2 (MRR2).

== History ==
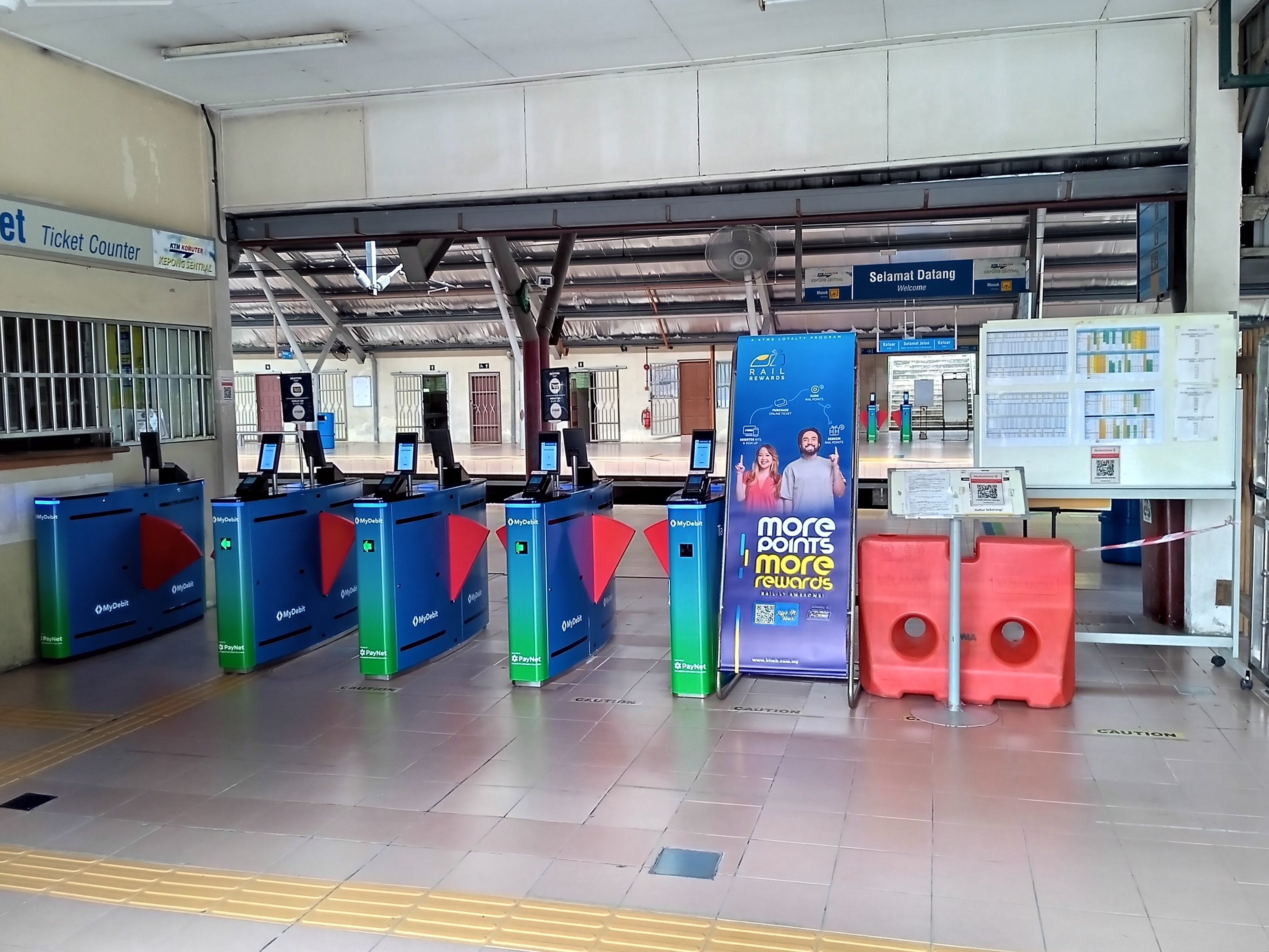
Concourse, 2023.

The station was built as an infill station, which opened in July 2006. KTM Intercity services were extended to this station in 2008 when it was included in the KL Sentral–Ipoh shuttle, which was discontinued when KTM ETS began operations in August 2010.

Kepong Sentral station was built to cater to the traffic in Kepong, a suburban area northwest of Kuala Lumpur. The older Kepong, which also serves the same locality is located 1 km away.

== Connection with MRT station ==
This station serves as a connecting station with the MRT Putrajaya Line at Sri Damansara Timur via a link bridge. The MRT station was opened on 16 June 2022, and is one of two interchanges between the Tanjung Malim-Port Klang Line and the MRT Putrajaya Line, the other being Sungai Buloh. Previously, the MRT station was named Kepong Sentral as well, but was subsequently named Sri Damansara Timur during launch.
