= Kepong Komuter station =

Railway station in Kepong, Malaysia

Coordinates: 3°12′10″N 101°38′15″E

Kepong

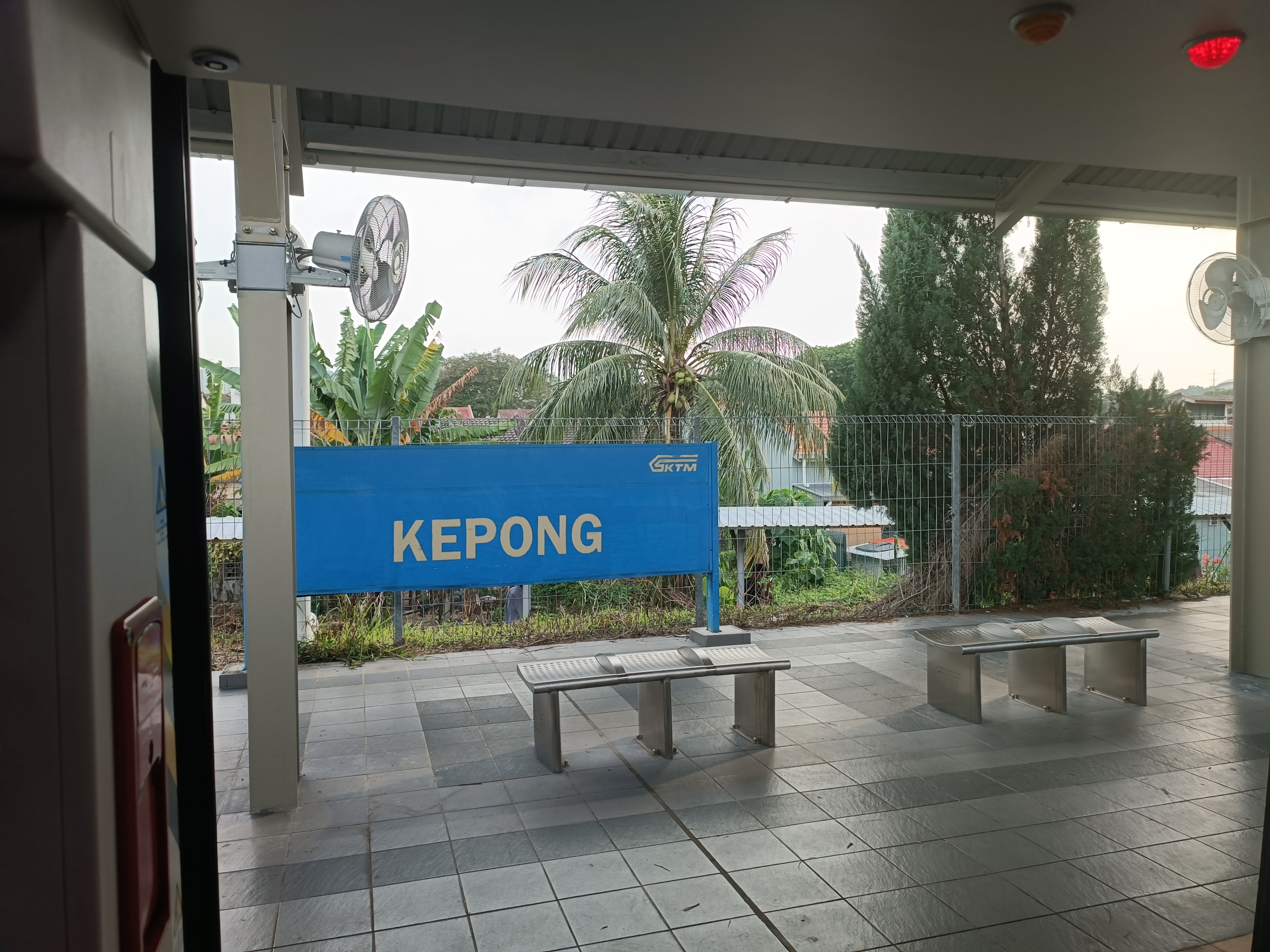

General information
- Other names: Malay: کڤوڠ (Jawi); Chinese: 甲洞; Tamil: கெப்போங்
- Location: Kepong, Kuala Lumpur, Malaysia.
- System: KA06 | Commuter rail station
- Owner: Keretapi Tanah Melayu
- Line: West Coast Line
- Platforms: 2 side platform
- Tracks: 4

Construction
- Parking: Available

Other information
- Station code: KA06

History
- Opened: 1892
- Rebuilt: 1995
- Electrified: 1995

Services
| Preceding station | Keretapi Tanah Melayu (Komuter) | Following station |
|---|---|---|
| Kepong Sentral towards Tanjung Malim | Tanjung Malim–Port Klang Line | Segambut Utara towards Port Klang |
Location

The Kepong Komuter station is a Malaysian commuter train station located in the northern area of Kuala Lumpur along the West Coast Line. The station is located along Jalan 32, Kepong Garden (Taman Kepong).

The Kepong Komuter station was built to cater increasing traffic in a suburban area with the similar name called Kepong. The Kepong Sentral Komuter station, which also serves the same locality, is located 1 km away.

As there are no other train systems that operate here other than KTM Komuter's Tanjung Malim–Port Klang Line, this station can be packed at certain times. In 2013 a bigger car park was built to facilitate for the number of vehicles used by commuters but this faced some level of opposition from some residents living along Jalan 32 because the greenery had to be destroyed.

The main access roads to Kepong are Damansara–Puchong Expressway, Jalan Kuching, MRR II and Jalan Ipoh. RapidKL bus and Metro bus provides transport here.
