= Klang Valley Mass Rapid Transit =

Rapid transit system in Greater Kuala Lumpur, Malaysia

Klang Valley Mass Rapid Transit (KVMRT)
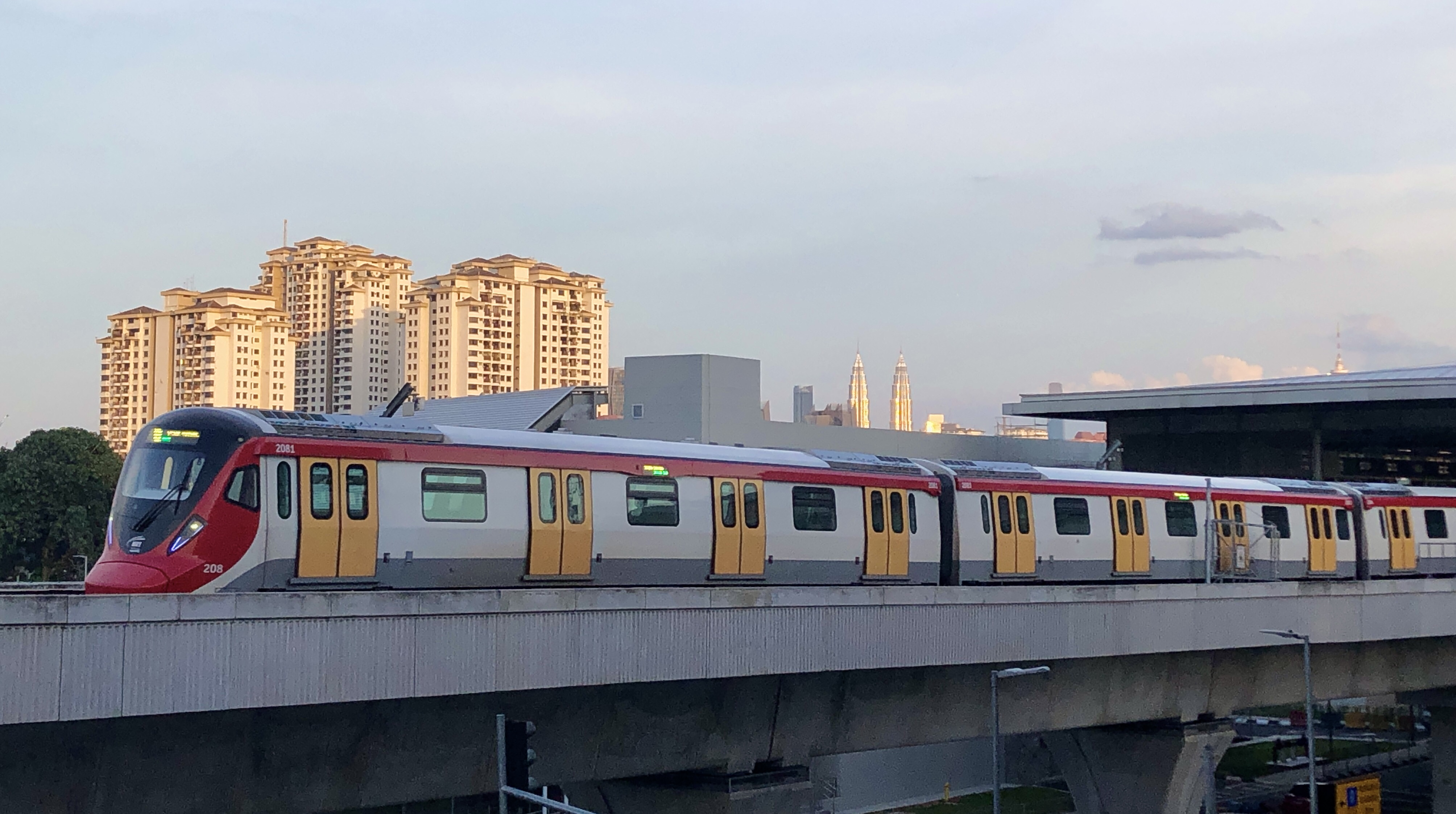
- Putrajaya Line's Hyundai Rotem EMU trainset

Overview
- Owner: MRT Corp
- Locale: Klang Valley, Malaysia
- Transit type: Rapid transit
- Number of lines: 3
- Line number: 9 Kajang Line; 12 Putrajaya Line; 13 Circle Line
- Number of stations: Kajang Line (31); Putrajaya Line (35); Circle Line (33)
- Website: mymrt.com.my

Operation
- Began operation: 9 (16 December 2016; 9 years ago); 12 (16 June 2022; 4 years ago)
- Operation will start: 13 (2032)
- Operator: Rapid Rail

Technical
- System length: TOTAL 155.3 km (96.5 mi); 9 46 km (29 mi); 12 57.7 km (35.9 mi); 13 51.6 km (32.1 mi)
- Track gauge: 1,435 mm (4 ft 8 1/2 in) standard gauge

The Klang Valley Mass Rapid Transit project is a planned three-line mass rapid transit (MRT) system in the Klang Valley (Greater Kuala Lumpur), an urban conurbation in Malaysia which includes the capital city of Kuala Lumpur. The MRT lines, when completed, will be operated as components of the Klang Valley Integrated Transit System.

Once completed, the MRT would serve to strengthen the current rail transit network in the Klang Valley, integrating the various existing rail lines while alleviating the severe traffic congestion in the Klang Valley metropolitan area. The proposal was announced in June 2010 and was approved by the government of Malaysia in December 2010. Construction of the first line commenced in July 2011. The project also represents one of the economic entry point projects identified for the Klang Valley "National Key Economic Area" under the Economic Transformation Programme by the Malaysian government.

The Mass Rapid Transit Corporation (MRT Corp), founded in September 2011, has been appointed by the government as the official and asset owner of the project and the rail lines. Prior to the founding of the corporation, the project was managed by Prasarana Malaysia Berhad.

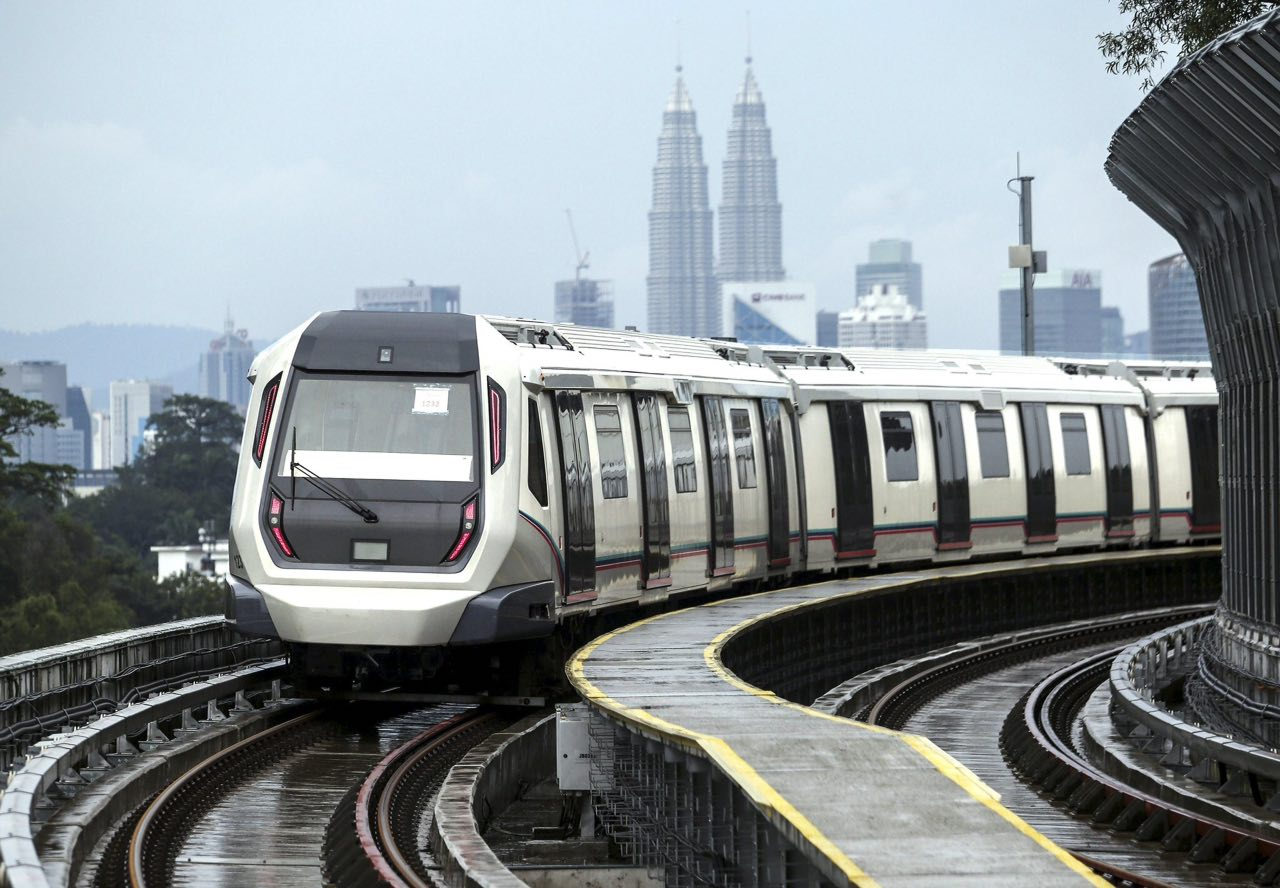
Kajang Line's MRT trainset of Siemens Inspiro EMU

== History ==
In June 2010, then Malaysian prime minister Najib Razak announced during the tabling of the 10th Malaysia Plan (2011-2015) that the government was studying the MRT proposal for the Klang Valley, inspired by Singapore's Mass Rapid Transit (MRT) system. The original proposal was dubbed the “Klang Valley Integrated Transportation System”, but it is more commonly referred to as the “Greater Kuala Lumpur MRT” or “Klang Valley MRT” by the press and analysts. While the concept itself was conceived by a joint venture between Gamuda Berhad and MMC Corporation Berhad, contract awards for the design and construction packages was expected to be tendered out by the government via the Swiss challenge method, if approved. The MMC-Gamuda joint venture indicated its intention to be the project leader and undertake tunneling works. The newly launched Public Land Transport Commission (SPAD) would oversee and coordinate the entire MRT development in terms of cost, viability, alignment and integration, and will play the role of regulators once the project is completed. The national public transport infrastructure company, Prasarana Malaysia would ultimately own and operate the MRT.

In December 2010, the government approved the implementation of the MRT project, and appointed MMC-Gamuda joint venture as the Project Delivery Partner. Apart from tunneling works, the MMC-Gamuda joint venture will not be allowed to bid for the other eight parcels of the project.

Job tenders were expected to open in April 2011 and construction was targeted to commence in July 2011. On 17 August 2011, the government announced that the Mass Rapid Transit Corporation (MRT Corp), a new company under the Finance Ministry had been formed to take control of the project from Prasarana Malaysia. MRT Corp would be the asset owner of the project and officially take over the project from Prasarana Malaysia on 1 September 2011. Prasarana Malaysia, through its subsidiary Rapid Rail, will be the operators of the new MRT lines, allowing integration with the existing Rapid KL rail network.

In May 2012, MRT Corp awarded four tenders worth RM3.22 billion for the MRT Kajang Line, the first line in the project. At the end of 2012, the corporation announced that the project for its first MRT line will not exceed RM23 billion, adding that the line is stipulated for completion by July 2017.

In December 2014, during a briefing for the MRT Kajang Line, the CEO of MRT Corp revealed more details about the second MRT line. Construction was expected to begin by November 2015, after approvals and public displays in early 2015. In February 2015, MRT Corp prepares tenders for the second MRT line. After numerous delays and re-alignments of the stations, the construction of second MRT line, the MRT Putrajaya Line began in September 2016, with Phase 1 operations of the line aimed to be started by July 2021.

On 16 December 2016, the construction of Phase 1 of the MRT Kajang Line which spans 23 km from Sungai Buloh to Semantan was completed and the line was opened to public. Phase 2 of line, the remaining portion of the line from Sematan to Kajang was completed and opened on 17 July 2017, allowing the entire line to enter full revenue service.

== Rationale ==
The MRT project represents one of the economic entry point projects identified for the Greater Kuala Lumpur/Klang Valley National Key Economic Area under the Economic Transformation Programme. The new MRT system is envisaged to radically improve and transform Kuala Lumpur's poor and sorely inadequate public transportation coverage and to propel the Klang Valley metropolitan area to be on par with that of a developed city. The new lines will increase Klang Valley's rapid rail network from 15 km per million people in 2010 to 40 km per million people once completed. The proposal also envisages a fivefold increase in rail ridership, in line with the government's target for public transport usage in the Klang Valley of 40% by 2020 from 18% in 2009.

The project's three lines – the MRT Circle Line, looping around Kuala Lumpur, the MRT Kajang Line and MRT Putrajaya Line covering a 20 km radius in the southeast–northwest direction from the city centre – will integrate the current rapid transit system in Kuala Lumpur and serve high-density areas which are currently not serviced by any rapid transit system. About 90 new stations are planned in this "Wheel and Spoke" concept, out of which 26 in the city centre will be underground. Ridership capacity will be 2 million passengers per day.

The preliminary project cost, which will be government-funded, was estimated by MMC-Gamuda to be at RM36 billion, representing the largest infrastructure project ever undertaken in Malaysia. Analysts estimate the cost could be significantly higher due to extensive tunneling works required. While the project is welcome by most, some analysts and commentators have expressed concerns on the commercial viability of the project and skepticism on the government part to pull off a project of such scale, given the numerous past delays in other rail-related projects in Malaysia. However, most agree that the project will generate immense economic contribution and investment returns in the future.

== Network ==
Initially, the previous proposed lines by MMC-Gamuda; Red Line will go from Damansara in the northwest to Serdang in the southeast, while Green Line will be from Kepong in the northeast to Cheras in the southwest. Both lines will pass through downtown area of Kuala Lumpur and converge at Dataran Perdana (Tun Razak Exchange) near Jalan Tun Razak. These routes ultimately went through numerous realignments. The final route for MRT Kajang Line is believed to have replaced the Kota Damansara-Cheras Line which was originally proposed by Prasarana in 2006.

In December 2010, the government approved the implementation of the MRT project and announced preliminary plans for the first line, the MRT Kajang Line, stretching 51 km from Sungai Buloh to Kajang through 31 stations. The line will pass through the city centre and will serve densely populated suburban areas including Kota Damansara, Mutiara Damansara, Bandar Utama, Taman Tun Dr Ismail, Bukit Damansara, Cheras, Bandar Tun Hussein Onn and Balakong, with a total catchment population of 1.2 million people. This line commenced construction in July 2011 and was completed in 2017.

Followed by the second line, MRT Putrajaya Line. It consists of 35 stations over 52.2 km stretching from Sungai Buloh to Putrajaya, passing through the city centre and serves the suburban areas of Kepong, Bandar Sri Damansara, Sentul, Titiwangsa, Kuchai Lama, Sungai Besi, Seri Kembangan and Cyberjaya. The line began construction in September 2016 and was fully operational in March 2023.

On 17 July 2025, the government approved the Final Railway Scheme for the third line, the MRT Circle Line. The line will consist of 33 stations (30 active and 3 provisional) over 51.6 km stretching from Bukit Kiara to the University of Malaya. The line is designed as an "Intermediate MRT" (i-MRT) system to facilitate tighter turning radii and reduce land acquisition impact in densely populated areas such as Sri Hartamas, Titiwangsa, Mont Kiara, Setapak, Setiawangsa, Cheras, Salak South, Pandan Indah, and Pantai Dalam. The construction of the Circle Line will form the "wheel" feature of the "Wheel and Spoke" model used in the construction of the entire MRT project. Construction is expected to begin in 2027 with full operations targeted for 2032.
