= Malaysia Rapid Transit Corporation =

Malaysian state-owned rail company

Malaysia Rapid Transit Corporation (MRT Corp)
- Type: State-owned enterprise
- Industry: Public transportation. The developer and asset owner of the mass rapid transit & MRT Feeder Buses
- Founded: September 2011; 14 years ago
- Headquarters: Bukit Damansara, Kuala Lumpur, Malaysia
- Key people: Wan Ahmad Dahlan Abdul Aziz, Chairman; Mohd Zarif Hashim, CEO
- Products: Mass Rapid Transit system
- Services: Current: 9 12; Future: 13 RTS MTL
- Owner: Minister of Finance Incorporated
- Subsidiaries: Malaysia Rapid Transit System Sdn Bhd (MRTS)
- Website: www.mymrt.com.my

Malaysia Rapid Transit Corporation (abbreviated as MRT Corp or MRTC), formerly known as Mass Rapid Transit Corporation, is a Malaysian state-owned company and a corporate body established under the Ministry of Finance (Incorporation) Act 1957. MRT Corp is fully owned by the Minister of Finance (Incorporated).

It was set up to be the developer and asset owner of the Mass Rapid Transit project in Kuala Lumpur, the capital of Malaysia, under the government's move to restructure the city's public transport system.

The company was established in September 2011 and took over the ownership of the Klang Valley Mass Rapid Transit Project (KVMRT) in October 2011 from Prasarana Malaysia Berhad.

MRT Corp’s responsibilities include monitoring and tracking of construction of all elevated structures, stations and depots of the mass rapid transit project. It also monitors the underground works which involves tunneling and construction of underground stations. It is also responsible for the contracts which they are involved in.

On 7 July 2025, the corporation was officially renamed from "Mass Rapid Transit Corporation Sdn Bhd" to "Malaysia Rapid Transit Corporation Sdn Bhd".

== Projects ==
- Kajang Line (fully operational)
- Putrajaya Line (fully operational)
- Circle Line (under planning, due for construction in 2027)
- Johor Bahru–Singapore Rapid Transit System (RTS Link, the first LRT line and metro system outside the Klang Valley, to be completed by 2026)
- LRT Mutiara Line (expected to be complete by 2031)
