= T113 =

T113 or variation, may refer to:

== Vehicles ==
- FMC T113, an aluminum-based prototype of the M113 armoured personnel carrier
- Talus MB-H amphibious tractor T 113
- Soviet minesweeper T-113, a World War II Lend-Lease ship; formerly the Admirable-class minesweeper USS Alarm (AM-140)
- HMT Wisteria (T113), a World War II British Royal Navy Tree-class trawler built by Smith's Dock Company
- SMS G113, a World War I Imperial German Navy S90-class torpedo boat, later renamed T 113
- French boat Branlebas (T113), a World War II French Navy La Melpomène-class torpedo boat; see List of ships at Dunkirk
- Japanese ship T-113, a World War II Imperial Japanese Navy No.101-class landing ship; see List of shipwrecks in November 1944
- Thai ship Tor.113 (T.113), a Royal Thai Navy ship, a M36-class fast attack craft; see List of equipment of the Royal Thai Navy

== Other uses ==
- Tetragrammaton Records "T-113" Tom Ghent; a 1969 album by Tom Ghent
- T113, a bus route in Kuala Lumpur, Malaysia; see List of bus routes in Greater Kuala Lumpur

== See also ==
- Type 113 naval trawler of the People's Republic of China
- Vickers Type 113 Vespa, British Interwar biplane
- T13 (disambiguation)
- 113 (disambiguation)
