= Mentari =

Mentari may refer to:

- PT Lion Mentari Airlines, the owner of Lion Air
  - Thai Lion Air, a Lion Air subsidiary (Callsign: MENTARI)
- Mentari Toys (also Mentari Massen Toys), a toy manufacturer from Mentari Group
- Mentari International School, an international school in Jakarta, Indonesia
- Mentari, a wireless services sub-brand of Indosat Ooredoo, a telecommunications provider in Indonesia.
- Mentari BRT station, a bus rapid transit station in Bandar Sunway, Malaysia
- Pitha Haningtyas Mentari, an Indonesian badminton player
