= List of bus routes in Greater Kuala Lumpur =

This is a list of the bus routes operated by various bus operators in and around Kuala Lumpur and Selangor, Malaysia.

Dates and times stated in the tables are according to 00:00 Malaysia Time (MST) (UTC+08:00) as of 1 December 2015.

As of 2021, there are 8 bus corridors in Kuala Lumpur:

Corridor	Route number	Constituencies served
Jalan Ipoh corridor	1XX	Kuala Selangor, Sungai Buloh, Kepong, Segambut (including Mont Kiara), parts of Selayang, Ulu Selangor, Sabak Bernam
Jalan Pahang corridor	2XX	Gombak, Batu Caves, Setapak, Wangsa Maju
Ampang corridor	3XX	KLCC, Ampang Jaya, Pandan, Maluri
Cheras corridor	4XX	Hulu Langat, Kajang, Bandar Tun Razak, Cheras, Semenyih, Bandar Baru Bangi, Beranang, Nilai
Sungai Besi corridor	5XX	Sri Petaling, Kuchai Lama, Bukit Jalil, Bandar Tasik Selatan, Sungai Besi, Puchong (partial), Serdang, Cyberjaya, Putrajaya
Jalan Klang Lama corridor	6XX	Puchong (partial), Old Klang Road (Seputeh)
Lebuhraya Persekutuan corridor	7XX	Federal Highway – Shah Alam, Port Klang, Petaling Jaya, Lembah Pantai, Mid Valley City/Abdullah Hukum, Subang Jaya, Sunway Pyramid, Subang, Puncak Alam (Kuala Selangor)
Damansara corridor	8XX	Damansara, Sungai Buloh (partial), Segambut/Mont Kiara, Subang

== Rapid KL routes ==
Rapid KL operated by Rapid Bus Sdn Bhd is the primary and largest bus operator that operates all stage bus routes in Ampang, Jalan Pahang, Cheras and Damansara corridors, all LRT and MRT feeder bus routes as well the majority of bus routes in Jalan Ipoh, Sungai Besi, Jalan Klang Lama and Federal Highway corridors.

Rapid KL bus services cover the entire Federal Territory of Kuala Lumpur and Federal Territory of Putrajaya while in Selangor it covers Petaling district (Petaling Jaya, Damansara, Shah Alam, Subang Jaya, Puchong, Seri Kembangan), Gombak district (Taman Melawati, Gombak, Selayang) and Hulu Langat district (Ampang Jaya, Pandan Indah, Kajang, Bandar Baru Bangi, Semenyih, Hulu Langat). However, it has lesser bus coverage in Klang district (Taman Sri Muda, Kota Kemuning, Klang town), Sepang district (Cyberjaya, Taman Mas) and Kuala Selangor district (Puncak Alam area only).

Bus lines in Greater Kuala Lumpur â€” Rapid KL and MRT feeder GTFS, 9 October 2026

Jalan Ipoh
Jalan Pahang
Ampang
Cheras
Sungai Besi
Jalan Klang Lama
Federal Highway
Damansara
PJ City Bus
Smart Selangor
Nadiputra
BRT Sunway
Other shuttles
Other shuttles

Routes shown are those published in the Rapid KL and MRT feeder GTFS feeds downloaded on 9 October 2026. Numbered routes and their T-prefix feeders are coloured by route-number corridor; community buses and BRT use service colours. Data: Prasarana / data.gov.my, CC BY 4.0.

=== Jalan Ipoh corridor ===
Route	Pre-BNR	Origin	Destination	First trip	Last trip	Frequency	Notes
151	U3	Bandar Baru Selayang	Pasar Seni	06:00	22:00	45 - 60 mins	via KTM Taman Wahyu
170	U2A	Wira Damai, Batu Caves	SOGO KL	05:30	23:00	30 mins	via Pinggiran Batu Caves, Duta–Ulu Klang Expressway & MRT Titiwangsa
171	U10	Wira Damai, Batu Caves	Lebuh Ampang	05:30	23:00	20 - 30 mins	via Sentul
173	U6	Taman Jasa Utama	Lebuh Ampang	05:30	23:35	15 mins	via KTM/MRT Kampung Batu
180	U224	Taman Dato' Senu, Sentul	Pasar Seni	05:30	23:30	30 mins	
190	U7	Mont Kiara	Masjid Jamek	05:30	23:45	15 - 20 mins	via KTM Segambut
T100	—N/a	Sungai Buloh MRT station	Hospital Sungai Buloh	06:00	23:30	45 mins	MRT feeder bus
T101	—N/a	Sungai Buloh MRT station	Bukit Rahman Putra	05:30	23:30	30 - 40 mins	MRT feeder bus
T102	—N/a	Sungai Buloh MRT station	Kampung Paya Jaras	05:30	23:30	30 mins	MRT feeder bus
T103	—N/a	Damansara Damai MRT station	Sutera Damansara	05:30	23:30	15 mins	MRT feeder bus
T104	—N/a	Kampung Selamat MRT station	Kampung Baru Sungai Buloh	06:00	23:30	40 - 60 mins	MRT feeder bus
T105	—N/a	Sungai Buloh MRT station	Taman Impian Indah	05:45	23:30	40 mins	MRT feeder bus
T106	—N/a	Sri Damansara Barat MRT station	Bandar Sri Damansara	06:00	23:30	30 mins	MRT feeder bus
T107	—N/a	Sri Damansara Sentral MRT station	Taman Wangsa Permai	06:00	23:30	40 mins	MRT feeder bus
T108	—N/a	Sri Damansara Sentral MRT station	Bandar Menjalara	06:00	23:30	25 mins	MRT feeder bus
T109	—N/a	Sri Damansara Sentral MRT station	Desa ParkCity	06:00	23:30	20 mins	MRT feeder bus
T110	—N/a	Sri Damansara Timur MRT station	Taman Ehsan/Desa Aman Puri	06:00	23:30	30 - 40 mins	MRT feeder bus
T114	T229	Metro Prima MRT station	Bandar Baru Selayang	06:00	23:30	20 -30 mins	MRT feeder bus
T115	—N/a	Kepong Baru MRT station	Taman Sri Sinar	06:00	23:30	30 - 40 mins	MRT feeder bus
T117	—N/a	Jinjang MRT station	Sri Segambut	06:00	23:30	30 - 40 mins	MRT feeder bus
T121	—N/a	Sri Delima MRT station	Taman Wahyu	06:00	23:30	45 - 50 mins	MRT feeder bus
T152	—N/a	Metro Prima MRT station	Pusat Bandar Selayang	06:00	23:30	30 - 40 mins	MRT feeder bus
T154	—N/a	Sungai Buloh MRT station	Kuang	06:00	23:30	45 mins	MRT feeder bus
T155	—N/a	Sungai Buloh MRT station	Kota Puteri	06:00	23:30	35 - 40 mins	MRT feeder bus
T180	T223	Sentul Barat MRT station	Taman Dato' Senu via Sentul Timur LRT Station	06:00	23:30	30 - 40 mins	MRT feeder bus via Sentul Timur LRT Station (Dato' Senu bound) and Sentul LRT Station (Sentul Barat bound)

=== Jalan Pahang corridor ===
Route	Pre-BNR	Origin	Destination	First trip	Last trip	Frequency	Notes
200	U12	UIA Gombak	SOGO KL	05:30	22:00	15 - 20 mins	via Jalan Gombak
201	U201	Batu 12 Gombak	SOGO KL	05:50	22:00	45 mins	via Padang Balang & MRT Titiwangsa
202	U1	Wira Damai, Batu Caves	Lebuh Ampang	05:00	23:30	15 - 20 mins	via Jalan Gombak
220	U23	Taman Melawati	Lebuh Ampang	05:30	22:30	30 mins	via Jalan Semarak
222	U20	Taman Melawati	Wangsa Maju LRT station	05:30	22:45	35 mins	LRT feeder bus
250	U24	Wangsa Maju LRT station	Lebuh Ampang	05:20	23:30	5 - 10 mins	
251	U25	AU3 Taman Keramat	Nadi Corp, Chow Kit	05:30	22:30	35 mins	
253	U34	Wangsa Maju LRT station	Ampang Point	06:00	23:00	40 mins	
254	U33	Ayer Panas	Chow Kit	06:00	23:30	30 mins	via Titiwangsa
T200	T231	Gombak LRT Station	UIA Gombak	06:00	23:00	30 mins	LRT feeder bus
T201	T203	Gombak LRT Station	Wira Damai	05:30	23:30	20 - 30 mins	LRT feeder bus
T202	T226	Taman Melati LRT station	Taman Melewar via Greenwood	07:00	23:00	45 mins	LRT feeder bus
T222	T305	Sri Rampai LRT station	Ukay Perdana	05:30	23:00	40 mins	LRT feeder bus
T223	T309	Setiawangsa LRT station	AU3 Taman Keramat via AEON AU2	05:40	00:00	20 - 30 mins	LRT feeder bus
T224	T330	Dato' Keramat LRT station	Desa Pandan	06:00	00:00	30 mins	LRT feeder bus
T250	T312	Wangsa Maju LRT station	Danau Kota	06:00	23:00	15 - 20 mins	LRT feeder bus
T251	T302	Sri Rampai LRT station	Seksyen 10, Wangsa Maju	05:40	23:30	30 - 40 mins	LRT feeder bus
BET16	E11A	Warta Baru	Monumen Alaf Baru after Dataran Gemilang, Putrajaya	06:00	16:30	2 trips daily	Bus Express Transit via Maju Expressway — only runs on weekdays (except public holidays)
BET17	E11B	Pinggiran Batu Caves	Monumen Alaf Baru after Kementerian Belia & Sukan, Putrajaya	06:00	16:30	1 trip daily	Bus Express Transit via Greenwood hub, MRR2 & Sungai Besi Expressway — only runs on weekdays (except public holidays)

=== Ampang corridor ===
Route	Pre-BNR	Origin	Destination	First trip	Last trip	Frequency	Notes
300	U30	Maluri	Lebuh Ampang	05:00	22:30	5 - 10 mins	via Jalan Ampang
302	B103	KLCC	Titiwangsa	06:00	23:30	30 mins	
303	U28	Taman Mulia Jaya	Lebuh Ampang	05:30	22:30	10 - 30 mins	
T300	U26/T320	Bukit Indah	Ampang Point	05:30	23:00	30 mins	via Ampang Jaya
T301	U29	Taman Mulia Jaya	Ampang Point	05:30	23:00	30 - 40 mins	via Jalan Merdeka
T302	U332	Hutan Lipur Ampang	Ampang Point	05:30	23:00	30 mins	
T303	T328	Ampang Point	Pandan Indah LRT station	06:30	20:30	60 mins	via Kampung Pandan Dalam
T304	T320	Bukit Indah	Ampang Point	05:40	23:40	20 mins	via Ampang LRT station
T305	U22/U27	Taman Midah MRT station	Sri Nilam	06:00	23:30	20 - 30 mins	MRT feeder bus
T350	T323	Cempaka LRT station	Taman Mawar	06:00	00:00	25 mins	LRT feeder bus
T351	T324	Cempaka LRT station	Taman Bukit Permai	06:00	00:00	30 mins	LRT feeder bus
T352	T327	Cochrane MRT station	Taman Shamelin Perkasa	05:45	23:30	15 - 30 mins	MRT feeder bus

=== Cheras corridor ===
Route	Pre-BNR	Origin	Destination	First trip	Last trip	Frequency	Notes
400	U46/U49	Damai Perdana	Pasar Seni	05:30	22:30	15 - 20 mins	via Bukit Bintang MRT station
420	U31	Taman Dagang	Menara Maybank	05:20	23:30	15 - 30 mins	via Bukit Bintang MRT station and Pandan Indah
421	U32	Taman Dagang	Menara Maybank	05:20	00:30	15 - 20 mins	via Bukit Bintang MRT station
450	U40	Hentian Kajang	Pasar Seni	05:30	23:30	30 mins	via Cheras
T400	U45	Cochrane MRT station	Bandar Tun Razak	06:00	23:30	30 mins	MRT feeder bus
T401	U44	Cochrane MRT station	Bandar Sri Permaisuri	06:00	23:30	30 mins	MRT feeder bus
T402	T433	Taman Midah MRT station	Salak Selatan LRT Station via HUKM	06:00	23:30	30 mins	MRT feeder bus
T406	U412	Batu 10 Cheras	Pangsun, Hulu Langat	06:00	22:30	30 - 40 mins	via Batu 14 Hulu Langat
T406B	U412A	Batu 10 Cheras	Kampung Ulu Lui, Sungai Lui	06:00	22:30	30 - 40 mins	via Batu 14 Hulu Langat
T407	—N/a	Tun Razak Exchange MRT station	Desa Pandan	06:00	23:30	15 - 30 mins	MRT feeder bus
T408	T408	Taman Mutiara MRT station	Taman Segar Perdana/ Cheras Awana	06:00	23:30	20 - 30 mins	MRT feeder bus
T409	—N/a	Taman Mutiara MRT station	Taman Supreme	06:00	23:30	15 - 30 mins	MRT feeder bus
T410	T405	Taman Connaught MRT station	Bandar Tasik Selatan station/TBS via Taman Connaught	06:00	23:30	15 - 30 mins	MRT feeder bus
T411	U47	Taman Connaught MRT station	Taman Cheras Awana	06:00	23:30	30 mins	MRT feeder bus
T412	—N/a	Taman Connaught MRT station	Alam Damai	06:00	23:30	15 - 30 mins	MRT feeder bus
T413	—N/a	Taman Suntex MRT station	Taman Kemacahaya via Taman Mudun	06:00	23:30	30 mins	MRT feeder bus
T414	—N/a	Sri Raya MRT station	Taman Tun Perak via Taman Megah Cheras	06:00	23:30	30 mins	MRT feeder bus
T415	—N/a	Bandar Tun Hussein Onn MRT station	Bandar Mahkota Cheras	06:00	23:30	30 mins	MRT feeder bus
T416	—N/a	Batu 11 Cheras MRT station	Taman Cheras Jaya	06:00	23:30	35 mins	MRT feeder bus
T417	—N/a	Batu 11 Cheras MRT station	Taman Desa Karunmas via Taman Impian Ehsan	06:00	23:30	20 - 30 mins	MRT feeder bus
T418	—N/a	Chan Show Lin MRT station	Kenanga Mall	06:00	23:30	30 mins	MRT feeder bus
T419	—N/a	Chan Show Lin MRT station	Razak Mansion	06:00	23:30	30 mins	MRT feeder bus
T450	U415	Beranang	Stadium Kajang MRT station	06:00	22:00	40 mins	via Semenyih
T451	T430	Stadium Kajang MRT station	Universiti Kebangsaan Malaysia	06:00	22:30	20 - 30 mins	MRT feeder bus
T453	—N/a	Bukit Dukung MRT station	Bandar Sungai Long via Taman Ikhlas	06:00	23:30	15 - 30 mins	MRT feeder bus
T455	—N/a	Bukit Dukung MRT station	Taman Sutera Cheras	06:00	23:30	30 - 45 mins	MRT feeder bus
T457	—N/a	Stadium Kajang MRT station	Prima Saujana	06:00	23:30	30 - 35 mins	MRT feeder bus
T458	—N/a	Stadium Kajang MRT station	Taman Indah	06:00	23:30	30 - 35 mins	MRT feeder bus
T459	—N/a	Stadium Kajang MRT station	Taman Jasmin via Bukit Mewah	06:00	23:30	30 - 35 mins	MRT feeder bus
T460	—N/a	Stadium Kajang MRT station	Bandar Teknologi	06:00	23:30	20 - 35 mins	MRT feeder bus
T461	—N/a	Kajang MRT station	Taman Kajang Utama	06:00	23:30	30 mins	MRT feeder bus
T462	—N/a	Kajang MRT station	Bandar Baru Bangi via Seksyen 8 Bangi	06:00	23:30	30 - 35 mins	MRT feeder bus
T463	—N/a	Kajang MRT station	Seksyen 4 Bangi	06:00	23:30	30 - 35 mins	MRT feeder bus
T464	T431	Stadium Kajang MRT station	Seksyen 1 Bangi via Teras Jenang	06:00	23:30	20 - 30 mins	MRT feeder bus
T465	—N/a	Stadium Kajang MRT station	Jade Hills	06:00	23:00	60 mins	MRT feeder bus

=== Sungai Besi corridor ===
Route	Pre-BNR	Origin	Destination	First trip	Last trip	Frequency	Notes
541	—N/a	Taman Equine MRT station	Kinrara BK5 LRT station	06:00	23:30	40 mins	LRT feeder bus
580	U48	Desa Petaling	Pasar Seni	06:00	22:30	40 mins	via LRT Salak Selatan
581	T424	Desa Tasik	Bandar Tasik Selatan station	06:30	23:45	30 - 40 mins	LRT feeder bus
590	U41	Bandar Sungai Long	Pasar Seni	05:30	22:40	15 mins	via Sungai Besi Expressway & Balakong
T504	—N/a	Cyberjaya Utara MRT station	Cyber 11	06:00	23:30	15 - 30 mins	MRT feeder bus
T505	—N/a	Cyberjaya Utara MRT station	Taman Pinggiran Cyber via LimKokWing University	06:00	23:30	20 - 30 mins	MRT feeder bus
T506	—N/a	Cyberjaya City Centre MRT station	Cyber 10	06:00	23:30	30 - 60 mins	MRT feeder bus
T507	—N/a	Cyberjaya City Centre MRT station	MAGIC Centre via Cyberjaya Transport Terminal	06:00	23:30	30 - 60 mins	MRT feeder bus
T509	—N/a	Putrajaya Sentral MRT station	Presint 16 via Alamanda	06:00	23:30	30 - 35 mins	MRT feeder bus
T511	—N/a	Putrajaya Sentral MRT station	Presint 5	06:00	23:30	15 - 30 mins	MRT feeder bus
T543	—N/a	Taman Equine MRT station	PPR Pinggiran Bukit Jalil	06:00	23:30	30 - 40 mins	MRT feeder bus
T544	—N/a	Putra Permai MRT station	Taman Lestari Putra	06:00	23:30	30 - 40 mins	MRT feeder bus
T545	—N/a	Putra Permai MRT station	Puchong Utama via Puchong Perdana LRT station	06:00	23:30	30 - 40 mins	MRT feeder bus
T559	—N/a	Sungai Besi MRT station	Kampung Malaysia Tambahan / Terminal Bersepadu Selatan	06:00	23:30	30 - 40 mins	MRT feeder bus
T560	—N/a	Sungai Besi MRT station	Bandar Tasik Selatan	06:00	23:30	15 - 30 mins	MRT feeder bus
T561	—N/a	Serdang Raya Utara MRT station	The Park Bukit Serdang	06:00	23:30	30 - 40 mins	MRT feeder bus
T565	—N/a	Serdang Jaya MRT station	Bukit Belimbing via The Mines	06:00	23:30	30 mins	MRT feeder bus
T566	—N/a	UPM MRT station	Taman Bukit Serdang	06:00	23:30	30 - 40 mins	MRT feeder bus
T567	—N/a	UPM MRT station	Taman Sri Serdang via Fakulti Kejuruteraan UPM	06:00	23:30	30 - 40 mins	MRT feeder bus
T568	—N/a	UPM MRT station	De Centrum Mall via Fakulti Pertanian UPM and UNITEN	06:00	23:30	30 - 40 mins	MRT feeder bus
T569	—N/a	Serdang Jaya MRT station	Batu 11 Cheras MRT station	06:00	23:30	15 - 30 mins	MRT feeder bus
T571	T417	Serdang KTM station	Taman Sri Pulai via Taman Desa Serdang	06:00	23:30	30 - 40 mins	
T580	T418	Awan Besar LRT station	Bandar Baru Sri Petaling	06:00	00:00	40 mins	LRT feeder bus via LRT Bukit Jalil
T581	T419	Alam Sutera LRT station	PPR Pinggiran Bukit Jalil	06:00	23:30	30 mins	LRT feeder bus via Jalan Kinrara 6
T585	—N/a	Kuchai MRT station	Taman Desa	06:00	23:30	30 mins	MRT feeder bus
T586	—N/a	Kuchai MRT station	Taman Oversea Union	06:00	23:30	30 - 40 mins	MRT feeder bus
T587	—N/a	Kuchai MRT station	Desa Petaling	06:00	23:30	30 - 40 mins	MRT feeder bus
T588	—N/a	Kuchai MRT station	Jalan Klang Lama	06:00	23:30	30 - 40 mins	MRT feeder bus
T589	—N/a	Taman Naga Emas MRT station	Bandar Baru Sri Petaling via Salak South	06:00	23:30	30 - 40 mins	

=== Jalan Klang Lama corridor ===
Route	Pre-BNR	Origin	Destination	First trip	Last trip	Frequency	Notes
600	U60	Puchong Utama	Pasar Seni	05:30	22:10	5 - 10 mins	via Jalan Puchong
602	U70	IOI Puchong Jaya LRT Station	Puchong Permai	05:30	00:00	30 mins	
640	U68	Taman Sri Sentosa	Pasar Seni	05:30	22:30	10 - 15 mins	
641	U76	Subang Jaya station	Pearl Point, Jalan Klang Lama	05:30	23:00	20 - 30 mins	
650	U72	Taman Desa	Pasar Seni	05:40	23:30	20 - 30 mins	
651	U73	Muhibbah LRT station	Pearl Point, Jalan Klang Lama	05:30	22:50	50 mins	LRT feeder bus
652	U71	Awan Besar LRT Station	Batu 3 ½ Jalan Klang Lama	06:00	00:00	40 - 60 mins	LRT feeder bus
T600	T508	IOI Puchong Jaya LRT station	Taman Wawasan	06:00	00:00	30 mins	LRT feeder bus
T601	T510	Puchong Prima LRT station	Puchong Utama via Puchong Permai	06:00	00:00	45 mins	LRT feeder bus
T603	—N/a	Puchong Prima LRT station	Taman Mas Sepang	06:00	00:00	30 mins	LRT feeder bus
T604	T507	Taman Perindustrian Puchong LRT station	Taman Kinara	06:00	00:00	30 mins	LRT feeder bus
T605	—N/a	Bandar Puteri LRT station	Bandar Puteri via Puchong Hartamas	06:00	23:00	20 - 60 mins	LRT feeder bus
T640	T505	Taman Jaya LRT station	Taman Sri Sentosa	05:30	22:42	25 mins	LRT feeder bus

=== Federal Highway corridor ===
Route	Pre-BNR	Origin	Destination	First trip	Last trip	Frequency	Notes
750	U80	Seksyen 2, Shah Alam	Pasar Seni	06:00	22:30	25 mins	Goes into UiTM Shah Alam campus and Seksyen 7 (Seksyen 2 bound only).
751	U64	Taman Sri Muda, Shah Alam	Pasar Seni	05:45	22:30	15 mins	
752	U65	Putra Heights LRT station	Dato' Menteri LRT station	06:00	23:30	40 - 80 mins	LRT feeder bus
753	U90	Hentian Pusat Bandar Shah Alam	UiTM Puncak Alam	06:20	22:00	60 - 120 mins	via Setia City Mall and Meru.
754	U605	Stadium Shah Alam LRT station	UiTM Puncak Perdana	06:30	20:00	60 mins	
770	U63	USJ 1, Subang Mewah	Pasar Seni	06:00	22:30	35 mins	via Sunway Pyramid & BRT Mentari (Pasar Seni bound)
771	U67	USJ 1, Subang Mewah	Desa Mentari & Sunway Pyramid	06:00	22:30	25 mins	
772	U81	Subang Suria Mahsing	Pasar Seni	05:30	22:00	20 - 30 mins	via Subang Perdana and Subang Airport
780	U88	Kota Damansara	Pasar Seni	05:30	22:00	45 mins	via SS2 Seapark
782	U75	Jalan Othman, Petaling Jaya	Pasar Seni	06:00	22:30	50 mins	
783	U623	Kelana Jaya LRT station	Subang Parade	06:00	23:30	40 mins	LRT feeder bus via BRT Mentari
T715	T600	UiTM Puncak Alam	Bandar Puncak Alam	07:00	20:30	90 mins	
T719		Klang Jaya LRT station	Taman Kota Pendamar				LRT feeder bus
T721		Taman Selatan LRT station	Pandamaran				LRT feeder bus
T722		Jambatan Kota LRT station	Sungai Kandis				LRT feeder bus
T725		Jambatan Kota LRT station	Kampung Sungai Udang				LRT feeder bus
T728		Pasar Klang LRT station	Setia City Mall				LRT feeder bus
T729		Pasar Klang LRT station	Green Energy Park				LRT feeder bus
T753	T602	Dato' Menteri LRT station	Seksyen 11, 10, 9, 8, 6, Shah Alam	05:45	23:30	30 mins	LRT feeder bus
T754	T529	Dato' Menteri LRT station	Terminal 17 Shah Alam	06:00	23:30	60 mins	LRT feeder bus
T756	T528	Dato' Menteri LRT station	Bukit Rimau via Kota Kemuning	06:00	22:00	70 - 80 mins	LRT feeder bus
T762		Dato' Menteri LRT station	Bukit Bandaraya				LRT feeder bus
T764		UiTM Shah Alam LRT station	Seksyen 24 Shah Alam				LRT feeder bus
T765		Seksyen 7 Shah Alam LRT station	Pangsapuri Danumas via UiTM Shah Alam				LRT feeder bus
T772	T608	Kwasa Sentral MRT station	Bukit Subang	05:30	23:30	25 - 30 mins	MRT feeder bus
T774	—N/a	Glenmarie LRT Station	MSU, Shah Alam Stadium	06:00	23:30	45 mins	LRT feeder bus
T776	—N/a	USJ7 LRT Station	USJ 1, Subang Mewah via Taipan LRT station	06:00	23:30	30 - 40 mins	LRT feeder bus
T779		Kerjaya LRT station	Subang HiTech				LRT feeder bus
T780	T622	Kelana Jaya LRT station	BU11 LRT station	06:00	23:30	20 - 30 mins	LRT feeder bus
T781	T624	Kelana Jaya LRT station	Kelana Centre Point via Subang LRT station	06:00	23:30	20 - 30 mins	LRT feeder bus
T782	T607	Lembah Subang LRT Station	Ara Damansara	06:00	23:30	20 - 30 mins	LRT feeder bus
T786	T629	Asia Jaya LRT station	Phileo Damansara MRT station	06:00	23:30	30 - 40 mins	LRT feeder bus
T787	T628	Asia Jaya LRT station	Seksyen 14 & 17, Petaling Jaya	06:00	23:30	30 mins	LRT feeder bus
T788	T631	Universiti LRT station	Mid Valley North Court	06:00	23:30	20 - 30 mins	LRT feeder bus
T789	T632	Universiti LRT station	Pantai Hill Park via Universiti Malaya	05:45	23:30	10 - 15 mins	LRT feeder bus
T790	T635	Taman Paramount LRT station	Mid Valley via PPUM	06:00	23:30	30 - 40 mins	LRT feeder bus
T791	T633	Kerinchi LRT station	Taman Bukit Angkasa	06:00	23:30	30 mins	LRT feeder bus
MENARA PRASARANA	—N/a	Lembah Subang LRT station	Menara Prasarana	07:45	18:10	20 - 60 mins	Shuttle for Prasarana HQ (Menara Prasarana)

=== Damansara corridor ===
Route	Pre-BNR	Origin	Destination	First trip	Last trip	Frequency	Notes
821	U74	Pantai Hill Park	Pasar Seni	05:30	23:30	10 - 15 mins	Bus turns around at Bangkok Bank 2
822	U87	Bangsar LRT station	Mid Valley South Court via Bangsar Shopping Centre	06:00	23:00	30 mins	LRT feeder bus
851	B115	Pasar Seni	Solaris Dutamas via Kompleks Mahkamah Jalan Duta	06:30	18:45	50 mins	
T801	—N/a	Kwasa Sentral MRT station	Seksyen 9, Kota Damansara	06:00	23:30	30 mins	MRT feeder bus
T802	—N/a	Kwasa Sentral MRT station	Subang Suria via Subang Bestari	05:30	23:30	20 - 25 mins	MRT feeder bus
T803	—N/a	Kwasa Sentral MRT station	Subang Suria via Subang Galaksi	06:00	23:30	20 - 30 mins	MRT feeder bus
T804	—N/a	Kwasa Sentral MRT station	Subang Airport via Subang Perdana	06:00	23:30	30 - 50 mins	MRT feeder bus
T805	—N/a	Kota Damansara MRT station	Seksyen 4 & 5, Kota Damansara via Selangor Science Park	06:30	22:00	25 - 40 mins	MRT feeder bus
T807	—N/a	Surian MRT station	Ara Damansara via Lembah Subang LRT station	06:00	23:30	15 - 20 mins	MRT feeder bus
T808	—N/a	Surian MRT station	Seksyen 11, Kota Damansara	06:00	23:30	30 - 45 mins	MRT feeder bus
T809	—N/a	Mutiara Damansara MRT station	Damansara Perdana	06:00	23:30	20 - 30 mins	MRT feeder bus
T810	—N/a	Mutiara Damansara MRT station	Bukit Lanjan	06:00	23:30	10 - 20 mins	MRT feeder bus
T811	—N/a	Bandar Utama MRT station	Mutiara Tropicana	06:00	23:30	30 - 40 mins	MRT feeder bus
T812	—N/a	Bandar Utama MRT station	Kampung Sungai Penchala via Pinggiran TTDI	06:00	23:30	25 - 30 mins	MRT feeder bus
T813	—N/a	Taman Tun Dr Ismail MRT station	SS22 Petaling Jaya	06:00	23:30	15 - 30 mins	MRT feeder bus
T814	—N/a	Taman Tun Dr Ismail MRT station	Taman Tun Dr Ismail	06:00	23:30	40 mins	MRT feeder bus
T815	—N/a	Phileo Damansara MRT station	University of Malaya	06:00	23:30	15 mins	MRT feeder bus
T816	—N/a	Phileo Damansara MRT station	SS2 Petaling Jaya	06:00	23:30	25 - 30 mins	MRT feeder bus
T817	—N/a	Pusat Bandar Damansara MRT station	Mid Valley South Court	06:00	23:30	20 - 30 mins	MRT feeder bus
T818	—N/a	Semantan MRT station	Sri Hartamas	06:00	23:15	15 - 30 mins	MRT feeder bus
T821	—N/a	Semantan MRT station	Kompleks Mahkamah Jalan Duta	06:00	20:00	30 - 40 mins	MRT feeder bus
T850	T634	Bangsar LRT station	Semantan MRT station via Pusat Bandar Damansara	06:00	23:30	25 mins	LRT feeder bus
T851	—N/a	KL Sentral	Parliament via Botanical Gardens	07:00	20:00	30 - 60 mins	Available during parliamentary sessions.
T852	—N/a	Semantan MRT station	Mont Kiara	06:00	22:30	10 - 15 mins	MRT feeder bus

=== Nadiputra Putrajaya ===
Route	Pre-BNR	Origin	Destination	First trip	Last trip	Frequency	Notes
P101	—N/a	Kompleks F	MOTAC & KPT Presint 5 via Presint 2,3	06:30	20:00	10 - 30 mins	
P102	—N/a	Kompleks E	Presint 11 via Presint 10	06:30	20:00	20 - 30 mins	
P103	—N/a	Kompleks E	Presint 14 & 15 via Alamanda	06:30	20:00	20 - 40 mins	
P104	—N/a	MOTAC	Wisma KBS P4 via PICC, Dataran Gemilang	06:30	20:00	20 - 30 mins	
P105	—N/a	Dataran Gemilang	Kompleks E via Presint 2,3,8	06:30	20:00	20 - 30 mins	
P106	—N/a	Kompleks E	Wisma KBS P4 via Presint 16,17,18	06:30	20:00	20 - 40 mins	
P108	—N/a	Putrajaya Sentral	Kompleks E	06:30	20:00	20 - 40 mins	

=== Bus Express Transit (BET) ===
Route	Pre-BNR	Origin	Destination	Via	First trip	Return trip	Frequency	Notes
BET16	E11A	Warta Lama	Monumen Alaf Baru after Dataran Gemilang, Putrajaya	Jalan Ipoh corridor via Maju Expressway	06:00	16:30	2 trips daily (weekdays)	Buses run on working days only, and can be tracked via KIOSK website.
BET17	E11B	Pinggiran Batu Caves	Monumen Alaf Baru after Kementerian Belia & Sukan, Putrajaya	Jalan Ipoh corridor via HAB Greenwood, Middle Ring Road II (MRR2) & Sungai Besi Expressway	06:00	16:30	1 trip daily (weekdays)	Bus runs on working days only, and can be tracked via KIOSK website. On the first trip, bus will arrive and dwell at HAB Greenwood until around 6:30 AM before departing to Putrajaya.

== Rapid on-Demand shuttle van ==
Route number	Destination	Rail Connection	Service Area
Jalan Ipoh corridor
T104B	Sungai Buloh MRT station – Bukit Rahman Putra	12 Kampung Selamat; 2 12 Sungai Buloh; 12 Damansara Damai	Bukit Rahman Putra; Damansara Damai; Kampung Baru Sungai Buloh; Sungai Buloh
T112B	Metro Prima MRT station – Taman Bukit Maluri/Taman Sri Sinar	2 Kepong Sentral; 2 Kepong; 12 Sri Damansara Sentral; 12 Sri Damansara Timur; 12 Metro Prima; 12 Kepong Baru	Bandar Sri Menjalara; Jalan Lang Emas; Jalan Udang Kepai; Kepong Baru; Metro Prima; Taman Botani Kepong; Taman Bukit Maluri; Taman Ehsan; Taman FRIM Kepong; Taman Pusat Kepong; Taman Sri Sinar; SD 3-4; Sri Segambut
T113B	Metro Prima MRT station – Taman Beringin	2 Kepong Sentral; 12 Sri Damansara Timur; 12 Metro Prima; 12 Kepong Baru; 12 Jinjang; 12 Sri Delima	Jinjang Utara; Kiara Bay; Metro Prima; Taman Aman Putra; Taman Botani Kepong; Taman Ehsan; Taman Fadason; Taman Intan Baiduri; Taman Metropolitan Kepong
T118B	Kentonmen MRT station – MITEC	1 Putra; 2 Segambut; 12 Kentonmen; 12 Jalan Ipoh; 12 Sentul Barat	Batu Kentonment; Dutamas; Jalan Ipoh; Taman Bamboo; Taman Kok Lian; Taman Segambut
T119B	Sri Delima MRT station – Sri Segambut	12 Sri Delima	Jalan Udang Kepai; Jinjang Selatan; Taman Pusat Kepong
T159B	Rawang KTM station – Taman Garing	2 Rawang	Pusat Bandar Rawang; Taman Bersatu; Taman Garing Utama; Taman Mawar Rawang; Taman Rawang Perdana; Taman Sri Rawang
T160B	Rawang KTM station – Country Homes Rawang	2 Rawang	Bandar Country Homes; Taman Anggun; Taman Desa Mas
T173B	Batu Caves KTM station – Wira Damai	1 Batu Caves	Batu Caves; Kampung Nakhoda; Selayang Baru; SG 1, 10; Taman Industri Bolton
Jalan Pahang corridor
T200B	Gombak LRT station – Taman Selaseh/IIUM	5 Gombak	Batu 7 Gombak; Gombak Setia; IIUM; Kampung Sungai Chin-chin; Kampung Sungai Pusu; Taman Berlian; Taman Greenwood; Taman Samudra; Taman Selasih
T202B	Taman Melati LRT station – Gombak Setia	5 Gombak; 5 Taman Melati	Gombak Setia; Kampung Tengah Gombak; Taman Cemerlang; Taman Ibukota; Taman Melati; TAR UMT
T221B	Sri Rampai LRT station – Ulu Kelang/Taman Melawati	5 Sri Rampai	Sri Rampai; Taman Melawati; Taman Permata; Ulu Kelang; Wangsa Melawati
T225B	Ampang Hilir – Dato' Keramat LRT station	5 Jelatek; 5 Dato' Keramat; 5 Damai	Ampang Hilir; AU1-2; Datuk Keramat; Desa Pandan; Jalan Ampang; Taman Keramat; Taman U Thant
T250B	Taman Genting Setapak – Setapak	5 Wangsa Maju	Danau Kota; Kampung Kuantan; Setapak; Taman Ayer Panas
T252B	Danau Kota – Jalan Genting Klang	5 Wangsa Maju	Danau Kota; Seksyen 1 Wangsa Maju; Taman Bunga Raya; Taman Ibukota; TAR UMT
T253B	Wangsa Maju LRT station – Sri Rampai LRT station	5 Wangsa Maju; 5 Sri Rampai	Seksyen 1-2, 4 Wangsa Maju; Sri Rampai; Wangsa Melawati
T254B	Titiwangsa station – Chow Kit Monorail station	1 2 Putra; 1 Sentul; 3 4 Sentul Timur; 3 4 Sentul; 3 4 8 12 Titiwangsa; 3 4 PWTC; 3 4 Sultan Ismail; 8 Chow Kit; 12 Hospital Kuala Lumpur	Chow Kit; Hospital Kuala Lumpur; Jalan Ipoh; Sentul; Titiwangsa
T255B	Bukit Antarabangsa – Setiawangsa LRT station	5 Setiawangsa; 5 Jelatek	AU 1-3; Bukit Antarabangsa; Setiawangsa; Taman Keramat
Ampang corridor
T306B	Kampung Ampang Indah – Taman Sri Watan/Taman TAR	3 Ampang	Kampung Dato Mufti Shuib; Taman Ampang Indah; Taman Bukit Indah; Taman Dagang Permai; Taman Kosas; Taman Mulia Jaya; Taman Saujana Ampang; Taman Sri Watan; Taman TAR; Tasek Permai; Tasik Tambahan
T307B	Ampang LRT Station – Ampang Jaya	3 Pandan Jaya; 3 Pandan Indah; 3 Cempaka; 3 Cahaya; 3 Ampang	Bandar Baru Ampang; Pandan Indah; Pandan Jaya; Taman Cahaya; Taman Cheras Indah; Taman Dagang; Taman Lembah Maju; Taman Muda; Taman Wawasan
Cheras corridor
T400B	Bandar Tun Razak LRT station – Taman Midah MRT station	4 Cheras; 4 Bandar Tun Razak; 9 Taman Pertama; 9 Taman Midah	Bandar Sri Permaisuri; Bandar Tun Razak; HUKM; Taman Ikan Emas; Taman Midah
T413B	Bandar Tun Hussein Onn MRT station – Taman Desa Baiduri	9 Bandar Tun Hussein Onn; 9 Batu 11 Cheras	Balakong; Bandar Tun Hussein Onn; Cheras Selatan; Taman Desa Baiduri; Taman Seri Cheras; Taman Seri Taming
T451B	Bandar Tasik Kesuma – Bandar Rinching	—N/a	Bandar Rinching; Bandar Tasik Kesuma; University of Nottingham Malaysia
T454B	Bukit Dukung MRT station – Sungai Sekamat	9 Bukit Dukung	Bukit Dukung; Kampung Batu 13 Kajang; Saujana Impian; Sungai Balak; Sungai Kantan; Sungai Sekamat; Taman Cheras Idaman; Taman Desa Baru; Taman Kasih; Taman Rakan
T456B	Sungai Jernih MRT station – Taman Puncak Saujana	9 Sungai Jernih; 9 Stadium Kajang	Kajang; Prima Saujana; Saujana Impian; Sungai Kantan; Taman Kajang Mulia
T463B	Kajang MRT station – Jalan Reko	1 9 Kajang; 1 Kajang 2; 9 Stadium Kajang	Bandar Baru Kajang; Jalan Reko; Kajang; Sungai Chua; Taman Bukit Mewah; Taman Kajang Utama; Taman Seri Mewah
T466B	UNITEN – Bangi	1 9 Kajang; 1 UKM	Taman West Country; Bandar Baru Bangi Seksyen 1-12; Kampung Dato Abu Baginda; Kampung Sungai Tangkas; Sungai Ramal; Taman Ayer Hitam Permai; Taman Universiti; UKM; UNITEN
T467B	Bangi KTM station – Bandar Bukit Mahkota	1 Bangi	Bandar Seri Putra; Bandar Bukit Mahkota; Kampung Bangi; Taman Bangi Indah
Sungai Besi corridor
T506B	Cyberjaya City Centre MRT station – Cyberjaya	6 7 12 Putrajaya; 12 Cyberjaya Utara; 12 Cyberjaya City Centre	Cyber 10; Garden Residence; Multimedia University; Taman Pinggiran Cyber; University of Cyberjaya
T512B	Putrajaya Sentral MRT station – Presint 11/Presint 1	6 7 12 Putrajaya	Presint 1-4, 7-11
T513B	Putrajaya Sentral MRT station – Presint 14 & 16	6 7 12 Putrajaya	Presint 1-4, 7, 14, 16
T514B	Putrajaya Sentral MRT station – PICC/Cybersouth Dengkil	6 7 12 Putrajaya	Presint 1-8, 18, 20; Cybersouth; Dengkil
T542B	Taman Equine MRT station – Lestari Perdana	12 Taman Equine; 12 Putra Permai	Lestari Perdana; Puncak Jalil; Taman Equine; Taman Putra Perdana; Taman Putra Permai
T545B	16 Sierra MRT station – Taman D'Alpinia	12 16 Sierra	D'Alpinia; 16 Sierra
T563B	Serdang Raya Utara MRT station – Pavilion Bukit Jalil	4 Bukit Jalil; 4 Sri Petaling; 4 Awan Besar; 4 Muhibbah; 12 Serdang Raya Utara; 12 Serdang Raya Selatan	Bukit Jalil; Meranti Park; Serdang Raya; Seri Kembangan; Taman Bukit Serdang; Taman Putera Indah
T568B	UPM MRT station – IOI Mall Putrajaya/Hospital Serdang/UNITEN	12 UPM	Hospital Sultan Idris Shah; MAEPS; Taman Sri Serdang; UNITEN; UPM
T582B	Sri Petaling LRT station – Bandar Sri Petaling/Taman Naga Emas	4 Sri Petaling; 12 Taman Naga Emas	Sri Petaling; Taman Naga Emas; Taman Sri Endah
Jalan Klang Lama corridor
T606B	Bandar Kinrara – Jalan Puchong	4 Alam Sutera; 4 Kinrara BK5	BK 1-6a; Jalan Puchong; Puncak Kinrara; Taman Kinrara 1-3; Taman Bukit Kuchai
T607B	Terminal Puchong Utama – Puchong Prima/Puchong Jaya	4 IOI Puchong Jaya; 4 Pusat Bandar Puchong; 4 Taman Perindustrian Puchong; 4 Bandar Puteri; 4 Puchong Perdana; 4 Puchong Prima	Bandar Puteri Puchong; Bandar Bukit Puchong; D'Island; Puchong Jaya; Puchong Perdana; Taman Puchong Prima; Taman Putra Impiana; Taman Putra Prima; Taman Tasik Puchong
T640B	Taman Medan – Sunway	2 Kampung Dato Harun	PJS 1-4; Sunway; Taman Dato Harun; Taman Kinrara 4-5; Taman Medan; Taman Sri Manja
T650B	Taman Desa – Jalan Klang Lama	—N/a	Taman Danau Desa; Taman Desa
T651B	Taman OUG – Kuchai MRT station	4 Awan Besar; 12 Kuchai	Awan Besar; Kuchai Lama; Taman OUG; Taman Tan Yew Lai; Taman Yarl
Federal Highway corridor
T707B	Johan Setia LRT station – Bandar Bestari	11 Johan Setia	Bandar Bestari; Bandar Bukit Tinggi; Bandar Parklands; Sijangkang
T708B	Johan Setia LRT station – Teluk Panglima Garang	11 Johan Setia	Bandar Bestari; Bandar Bukit Tinggi; Bandar Parklands; Sijangkang; Taman Bentara; Teluk Panglima Garang
T709B	Johan Setia LRT station – Rimbayu	11 Johan Setia	IJM Rimbayu; Jalan Kebun; Johan Setia
T710B	Johan Setia LRT station – Taman Pendamar Indah	11 Johan Setia	Bandar Bukit Tinggi 3; Bandar Parklands; Bayuemas; Taman Pendamar Indah
T711B	Bandar Bukit Tinggi LRT station – Bandar Puteri	11 Klang Jaya; 11 Bandar Bukit Tinggi; 11 Johan Setia	Ambang Botanic; Bandar Puteri Klang; Johan Setia; Kota Bayuemas; Taman Desawan
T714B	Bandar Bukit Tinggi LRT station – Bandar Botanic	11 Bandar Bukit Tinggi	Bandar Botanic
T717B	Bandar Bukit Tinggi LRT station – Bandar Bukit Tinggi	11 Bandar Bukit Tinggi; 11 Klang Jaya	Ambang Botanic; Bandar Bukit Tinggi 1 & 2; Bandar Botanic; Taman Klang Jaya
T718B	Klang Jaya LRT station – Taman Klang Ria	11 Seri Andalas; 11 Klang Jaya	Bandar Sentosa; Sri Andalas; Sri Demak; Taman Desa Utama
T720B	Seri Andalas LRT station – Taman Sri Andalas	2 Klang; 11 Hospital Tengku Ampuan Rahimah; 11 Seri Andalas	Bandar Sentosa; Kampung Jawa; Taman Klang Jaya; Taman Saga; Taman Sri Andalas
T723B	Klang Komuter station - Teluk Gadong	2 Klang; 2 Teluk Pulai; 2 Teluk Gadong; 11 Jambatan Kota; 11 Taman Selatan	Sungai Udang; Taman Aneka Baru; Taman Gembira; Taman Kota Jaya; Taman Palm Grove; Taman Teluk Pulai Indah; Teluk Pulai
T724B	Jambatan Kota – Taman Summit	11 Jambatan Kota	Bukit Kuda; Kampung Kuantan; Taman Intan; Taman Summit
T726B	Jalan Meru – Taman Eng Ann	11 Pasar Klang; 11 Jalan Meru	Taman Berkely; Taman Eng Ann; Taman Meru
T727B	Klang Komuter station - Batu Belah	2 Klang; 11 Pasar Klang; 11 Jalan Meru; 11 Jambatan Kota	Jalan Sungai; Kampung Batu Belas; Taman Bahagia; Taman Bunga Melor; Taman Sentosa; Sungai Pinang
T732B	Bandar Baru Klang LRT station – Taman Berkeley	11 Bandar Baru Klang	Bandar Baru Klang; Taman Berkeley; Taman Intan
T733B	Padang Jawa Komuter station – Seksyen 7 Shah Alam LRT station	2 Padang Jawa; 11 Seksyen 7 Shah Alam	i-City; Kawasan Perindustrian Bukit Raja; Ken Rimba; Seksyen 7 Shah Alam; Taman Rashna
T734B	Seksyen 7 Shah Alam LRT station – U12 Cahaya Alam	11 Seksyen 7 Shah Alam	Eco Ardence; Seksyen 7 Shah Alam; Seksyen U12 Cahaya Alam / Desa Alam; UiTM Shah Alam
T735B	Salak Tinggi ERL station – Kota Warisan	7 Salak Tinggi	Kota Warisan; Salak Tinggi; Taman Dahlia; Taman Ixora; Taman Mawar; Xiamen University Malaysia
T736B	Rimbayu/Bandar Saujana Putra – Putra Heights LRT station	4 5 Putra Heights	Bandar Saujana Putra; Bukit Lanchong; Putra Heights; Rimbayu
T752B	Putra Heights – Putra Heights LRT station	4 5 Putra Heights	Alam Megah; Bukit Lanchong; Putra Heights; Seksyen 28 Shah Alam; Taman Bunga Negara
T753B	UiTM Puncak Alam – Puncak Alam	—N/a	Eco Grandeur; FELDA Bukit Cerakah; Puncak Alam; UiTM Puncak Alam
T754B	Dato' Menteri LRT station – Shah Alam KTM station	2 Shah Alam; 11 Dato' Menteri 11 UiTM Shah Alam	Seksyen 1-7, 9-12, 14, 15-16, 18-20, 23 Shah Alam
T755B	Alam Budiman/Setia Alam – Setia City Mall	—N/a	Alam Budiman; Setia Alam; UiTM Puncak Perdana
T757B	Alam Megah LRT Station – Alam Megah	5 Alam Megah; 5 Subang Alam	Alam Megah; HICOM; Seksyen 26-28 Shah Alam; Taman Alam Indah; Taman Bunga Negara
T759B	Kota Kemuning – Gamuda Walk Mall	—N/a	Bukit Kemuning; Jalan Kebun; Kampung Sri Gambut; Kota Kemuning
T761B	Stadium Shah Alam LRT station – Seksyen 13 Shah Alam	11 Stadium Shah Alam	Seksyen 13 Shah Alam
T763B	Padang Jawa KTM station – Terminal 17	2 Padang Jawa; 11 UiTM Shah Alam	Kampung Padang Jawa; Seksyen 16-18 Shah Alam
T772B	Saujana Utama – Jalan Kuala Selangor	—N/a	Bandar Saujana Utama; Denai Alam; Elmina
T774B	Glenmarie LRT Station – MSU, Shah Alam Stadium	5 11 Glenmarie; 11 Temasya; 11 Stadium Shah Alam	Glenmarie; MSU; Seksyen 13
T775B	Glenmarie LRT station – Temasya Glenmarie	5 11 Glenmarie; 11 Kerjaya	Glenmarie Industrial Park
T778B	USJ21 LRT Station – One City/USJ 1	5 Wawasan; 5 USJ21	USJ 1, 13-27
T780B	Kelana Jaya LRT station – Taman SEA/Damansara Jaya/SS2/SS7	5 Taman Bahagia; 5 Kelana Jaya; 11 BU11; 11 Damansara Idaman; 11 Subang	BU 11-12; Damansara Jaya; Damansara Utama; Kampung Cempaka; SS 2, 7, 23-26; Taman Bukit Mayang Emas; Taman Mayang Jaya; Taman SEA
T783B	Taman Bahagia LRT station – SS6/SS7	5 Taman Bahagia; 11 Subang	SS 3, 5-7
T785B	Taman Paramount LRT station – Kampung Baiduri/Sg Way	2 Seri Setia; 2 B1 Setia Jaya; 5 Taman Paramount; B1 Mentari	PJS 5-6, 8; SEA Park; Seksyen 21-22; SS1, 3, 5-6, 8-9; Sungai Way
T793B	PJ Sentral – Seksyen 7 & 17, Petaling Jaya	5 Taman Jaya; 5 Asia Jaya; 9 Phileo Damansara	Jalan Sultan; Seksyen 3-4, 6-7, 12-13, 15-19 Petaling Jaya
Damansara corridor
T804B	Kwasa Sentral MRT station – Subang Bestari/Subang Skypark Terminal	9 12 Kwasa Damansara; 9 Kwasa Sentral	Kampung Melayu Subang; Kwasa Damansara; Mutiara Subang; Subang Bestari; Subang Perdana; Subang Airport
T821B	Universiti LRT station – Pantai Sentral	5 Kerinchi; 5 Universiti	Pantai Dalam; Taman Pantai Indah; UM
T822B	CBD Kuala Lumpur	1 2 Putra; 1 2 Bank Negara; 1 2 Kuala Lumpur; 1 2 5 6 7 8 KL Sentral; 2 Segambut; 2 5 Abdullah Hukum; 3 4 8 12 Titiwangsa; 3 4 PWTC; 3 4 Sultan Ismail; 3 4 Bandaraya; 3 4 5 Masjid Jamek; 3 4 9 Plaza Rakyat; 3 4 Pudu; 5 12 Ampang Park; 5 KLCC; 5 Kampung Baru; 5 Dang Wangi; 5 Damai; 5 9 Pasar Seni; 5 Bangsar; 8 Tun Sambanthan; 8 Maharajalela; 8 Imbi; 8 9 Bukit Bintang; 8 Raja Chulan; 8 Bukit Nanas; 8 Medan Tuanku; 8 Chow Kit; 9 Semantan; 9 Pusat Bandar Damansara; 9 Semantan; 9 Muzium Negara; 9 Merdeka; 9 12 Tun Razak Exchange; 12 Sentul Barat; 12 Hospital Kuala Lumpur; 12 Raja Uda; 12 Persiaran KLCC; 12 Conlay	Bangsar; Brickfields; Bukit Bandaraya; Bukit Bintang; Bukit Damansara; Bukit Pantai; Dutamas; Jalan Ampang; Jalan Parlimen; Kampung Baru; Pudu; Pusat Bandar Kuala Lumpur; Sri Hartamas; Taman Duta; Titiwangsa
T850B	Bangsar LRT Station – Taman Bandaraya	5 Bangsar; 9 Pusat Bandar Damansara	Bangsar; Bukit Bandaraya; Jalan Bangsar; Taman Bandaraya; Taman Lucky

== GOKL routes ==
Go KL City Bus is a free bus service in the city centre of Kuala Lumpur, Malaysia. Previously managed by Land Public Transport Commission (SPAD), the services were taken over by Kuala Lumpur City Hall (DBKL) and operated by SKS Coachbuilders Sdn. Bhd. since 1 January 2019.

GOKL route number	Destination	Bus corridor
GOKL 01	KLCC – Bukit Bintang	Ampang
GOKL 02	Pasar Seni – Bukit Bintang	Damansara
GOKL 03	Titiwangsa hub – KL Sentral	Damansara
GOKL 04	Titiwangsa hub – Bukit Bintang	Damansara
GOKL 05	Titiwangsa hub – MINDEF	Ampang
GOKL 06	Universiti LRT station – PPR Seri Pantai	Federal Highway
GOKL 07	Dato' Keramat LRT station – Flat Kelumpuk Bambu	Jalan Pahang
GOKL 08	KTM / MRT Kampung Batu – Chow Kit	Jalan Ipoh
GOKL 09	Section 10 – Sri Rampai LRT station	Jalan Pahang
GOKL 10	MRT Aeon Maluri – Bandar Sri Permaisuri	Cheras
GOKL 11	Cochrane MRT station – Bandar Tun Razak	Cheras
GOKL 12	Sri Delima MRT station – Taman Fadason	Jalan Ipoh
GOKL 13	Jinjang MRT station – MATRADE	Jalan Ipoh
GOKL 14	Kompleks Komuniti Muhibbah – PPR Pinggiran Bukit Jalil	Jalan Klang Lama
GOKL 15	Alam Damai – H.U.K.M	Cheras

== Smart Selangor routes ==
Smart Selangor Bus is a free bus service funded by the Selangor state government launched on 1 July 2015. There are over 56 routes available and most Smart Selangor Bus routes are confined to one local government area.

Route number	Destination	Bus operator	Bus corridor
SHAH ALAM CITY COUNCIL (MBSA)
SA01	Shah Alam Komuter station – Seksyen 7, Shah Alam	SKS Coachbuilders Sdn. Bhd.	Federal Highway
SA02	Hentian Pusat Bandar Shah Alam – Batu Tiga Komuter station	Rapid Bus	Federal Highway
SA03	Shah Alam Komuter station – Seksyen 18, 17, 24	Rapid Bus	Federal Highway
SA04	Terminal Seksyen 17 – Hospital Shah Alam	Rapid Bus	Federal Highway
SA05	Seksyen 13 – Bukit Jelutong	Rapid Bus	Federal Highway
SA06	Kota Kemuning – Shah Alam Komuter station	Rapid Bus	Federal Highway
SA07	Batu Tiga Komuter station – Seksyen 20 via HICOM	Rapid Bus	Federal Highway
SA08	Alam Megah LRT Station – Meranti Terrace	Rapid Bus	Federal Highway
SA09	Kota Kemuning, Seksyen 31 – Kampung Jalan Kebun	Wawasan Sutera	Federal Highway
SA10	Bukit Subang – Bukit Jelutong	Wawasan Sutera	Federal Highway
BK02 (SU13A)	Setia City Mall – Pangsapuri De Palma	Wawasan Sutera	Federal Highway
SUBANG JAYA CITY COUNCIL (MBSJ)			Federal Highway
SJ01	USJ 7 BRT/LRT station – Subang Jaya KTM/LRT Station	SKS Coachbuilders Sdn. Bhd.	Federal Highway
SJ02	Pusat Bandar Puchong LRT station – SS18 LRT station via Bandar Sunway	SKS Coachbuilders Sdn. Bhd.	Federal Highway
SJ03	Kinrara BK5 LRT station – SMK Bandar Puchong Jaya	SKS Coachbuilders Sdn. Bhd.	Jalan Klang Lama
SJ04	Serdang Komuter station – Serdang Hospital via Serdang Jaya & UPM	SKS Coachbuilders Sdn. Bhd.	Sungai Besi
SJ05	Terminal Putra Permai – Pangsapuri Bayu via Bukit Serdang & Serdang Jaya	SKS Coachbuilders Sdn. Bhd.	Sungai Besi
KLANG ROYAL CITY COUNCIL (MBDK)
KLG1	Bandar Klang – Hospital TAR	Wawasan Sutera	Federal Highway
KLG2A	SJKC Kong Hoe – Taman Sri Pekan	Rapid Bus	Federal Highway
KLG2B	SJKC Kong Hoe – Taman Intan	Rapid Bus	Federal Highway
KLG3A	Taman Rakyat – Bandar Klang	Rapid Bus	Federal Highway
KLG3B	Bandar Putera - Bandar Klang via Jalan Raja Nong	Rapid Bus	Federal Highway
KLG3C	Bandar Putera – Bandar Klang via Jalan Kebun	Rapid Bus	Federal Highway
KLG4	Klang Sentral – Taman Seri Kerayong	Wawasan Sutera	Federal Highway
PETALING JAYA CITY COUNCIL (MBPJ) (branded as PJ City Bus)
PJ01	Terminal Taman Medan – PPUM via Taman Jaya LRT station	Rapid Bus	Federal Highway
PJ02	Taman Jaya LRT station – SS 2 via Jalan Bukit	Rapid Bus	Federal Highway
PJ03	Taman Bahagia LRT station – SS 6 Kelana Park View	Rapid Bus	Federal Highway
PJ04	Taman Bahagia LRT station – Sungai Way via SS 2	Rapid Bus	Federal Highway
PJ05	Bandar Utama – Taman Bahagia LRT station	Rapid Bus	Damansara
PJ06	Bandar Utama – Damansara Damai via Sri Damansara	Rapid Bus	Damansara
AMPANG JAYA MUNICIPAL COUNCIL (MPAJ)
AJ01	Ukay Perdana – Taman Melawati	Rapid Bus	Jalan Pahang
AJ2A	Bandar Baru Ampang – Taman Dagang Jaya via LRT Ampang/LRT Cahaya	Rapid Bus	Ampang
AJ2B	Bandar Baru Ampang – Taman Dagang Jaya via Aeon BiG and Pandan Mewah	Rapid Bus	Ampang
AJ03	Cempaka LRT Station – Taman Bukit Teratai	Rapid Bus	Ampang
AJ04	Pandan Height – Taman Lembah Maju	Rapid Bus	Ampang
KAJANG MUNICIPAL COUNCIL (MPKj)
KJ01	Hentian Kajang – Bandar Kajang	Rapid Bus	Cheras
KJ02	Bandar Bukit Mahkota – Bangi Komuter station	Rapid Bus	Cheras
KJ03	Bandar Tun Hussein Onn MRT station – Taman Tun Perak via Cheras Perdana	Rapid Bus	Cheras
KJ04	Hentian Kajang – Bandar Baru Bangi	Rapid Bus	Cheras
SELAYANG MUNICIPAL COUNCIL (MPS)
MPS1	Selayang Mutiara – Gombak LRT Station	Rapid Bus	Jalan Ipoh
MPS2A	Lotus Rawang – Rawang Bus Terminal	Rapid Bus	Jalan Ipoh
MPS2B	Lotus Rawang – Taman Garing Utama	Rapid Bus	Jalan Ipoh
MPS3	Batu Arang – Hospital Sungai Buloh via Sungai Buloh KTM/MRT station	Rapid Bus	Jalan Ipoh
MPS4	Wangsa Permai – Hentian Stadium Selayang	Rapid Bus	Jalan Ipoh
SEPANG MUNICIPAL COUNCIL (MPSp)
SPG1	Tanjung Sepat – KLIA/KLIA2 via Pekan Sungai Pelek and Pekan Sepang	Causeway Link (Handal Indah)	Federal Highway
SPG2	Taman Salak Perdana – KLIA/KLIA2 via Taman Seroja, Kota Warisan and ERL Salak Tinggi	Causeway Link (Handal Indah)	Federal Highway
KUALA LANGAT MUNICIPAL COUNCIL (MPKL)
BTG01	Banting – KLIA2	Rapid Bus	Federal Highway
BTG02	Banting – Taman Banting Baru	Rapid Bus	Federal Highway
KUALA SELANGOR MUNICIPAL COUNCIL (MPKS)
KS01	Kuala Selangor – Sekinchan via Tanjung Karang	Wawasan Sutera	Jalan Ipoh
KS02	Bandar Puncak Alam – Sungai Buloh KTM/MRT station	Wawasan Sutera	Jalan Ipoh
HULU SELANGOR MUNICIPAL COUNCIL (MPHS)
HS01	Kuala Kubu Bharu – Bukit Sentosa via Rasa	SKS Coachbuilders Sdn. Bhd.	Jalan Ipoh
HS02	Antara Gapi – Batang Kali KTM station	SKS Coachbuilders Sdn. Bhd.	Jalan Ipoh
HS03A	Bukit Sentosa – Bandar Sungai Buaya	SKS Coachbuilders Sdn. Bhd.	Jalan Ipoh
HS03B	Bukit Sentosa – Serendah KTM station	SKS Coachbuilders Sdn. Bhd.	Jalan Ipoh
HS04	Bukit Sentosa – Taman Bunga Raya	SKS Coachbuilders Sdn. Bhd.	Jalan Ipoh
SABAK BERNAM DISTRICT COUNCIL (MDSB)
SB01	Pekan Sabak – Sekinchan via Sungai Besar	Wawasan Sutera	Jalan Ipoh
SB02	Pekan Sabak – Parit Baru via Sungai Air Tawar	Wawasan Sutera	Jalan Ipoh
SB03	Pekan Sabak - Kampung Merbau Berdarah	Wawasan Sutera	Jalan Ipoh

== Routes from other bus operators ==
In addition to the three primary bus operators (Rapid KL, GOKL & SmartSelangor), there are some bus routes in Klang Valley operated by private bus operators, where most bus operators receiving Interim Stage Bus Support Fund (ISBSF) license from the Land Public Transport Agency. Most stage bus routes by private bus operators are confined to the service areas that not served by Rapid KL bus services (such as Klang, Banting, south Puchong and Kuala Selangor as well one route in Putrajaya for going to IOI City Mall, the only Klang Valley megamall not served by Rapid KL buses & rail transport).

Unlike the Rapid KL bus services, these bus services continue to accept cash payment. Some bus routes are formerly operated by Rapid KL prior to the Bus Network Revamp in 2015. Selangor Omnibus services is now acquired and managed by Causeway Link.

Route number	Pre-BNR route	Destination	Operator	Type	Corridor
100	141	Kuala Selangor – Hab Lebuh Pudu	Causeway Link (Handal Indah)	U	Jalan Ipoh
103	158 (SO); 100; U8 (RapidKL)	Damansara Damai – Hab Lebuh Pudu	Causeway Link (Handal Indah)	U	Jalan Ipoh
104	144B (SO); U4 (RapidKL)	Taman Wangsa Permai / Desa Aman Puri – HAB Lebuh Pudu	Causeway Link (Handal Indah)	U	Jalan Ipoh
105	n/a	Kuala Selangor – Bestari Jaya	Wawasan Sutera	U	Jalan Ipoh
107	147A	Bestari Jaya – Hab Lebuh Pudu	Causeway Link (Handal Indah)	U	Jalan Ipoh
120	26 (Metrobus); U222 (RapidKL)	Jinjang Utara – Hab Lebuh Pudu	Causeway Link (Handal Indah)	U	Jalan Ipoh
150	43 (SJ)	Rawang - Hab Lebuh Pudu	MARA Liner	U	Jalan Ipoh
152	U209 (RapidKL)	Bukit Idaman – Hab Lebuh Pudu	MARA Liner	U	Jalan Ipoh
154	36 (SJ)	Tanjong Malim - Rawang –	MARA Liner	U	Jalan Ipoh
156	43A; Mini Bus	Bukit Beruntung – Rawang	MARA Liner	U	Jalan Ipoh
BET5	BET5	Tasik Puteri – Lebuh Pudu via Bandar Country Homes	MARA Liner	BET	Jalan Ipoh
BET6	BET6	Bukit Sentosa – Hab Lebuh Pudu via North-South Expressway	MARA Liner	BET	Jalan Ipoh
ML34	n/a	FELDA Sungai Tengi - Tanjong Karang	MARA Liner	U	Jalan Ipoh
270	n/a	Titiwangsa – Awana Genting via Jalan Gombak	Wawasan Sutera	BET	Jalan Pahang
523	522(SO); 502(Nadi Putra); U42(RapidKL); E1(RapidKL)	Putrajaya Sentral – Hab Lebuh Pudu via Presint 2, IOI City Mall and Serdang KTM Station	KR Travel and Tours	U	Sungai Besi
601	U69 (rapidKL); 20 (Metrobus)	Taman Putra Perdana – Pasar Seni / Kotaraya	Causeway Link (Handal Indah)	U	Jalan Klang Lama
604	21 (Metrobus)	Taman Saujana Puchong – Pasar Seni / Kotaraya	Causeway Link (Handal Indah)	U	Jalan Klang Lama
608	T515 (RapidKL)	Pulau Meranti – IOI Puchong Jaya LRT station	Causeway Link (Handal Indah)	U	Jalan Klang Lama
700	710 (Seranas); 99 (KKBB)	Klang – Pasar Seni	Wawasan Sutera	U	Federal Highway
704	19 (KKBB)	Meru – Klang	Wawasan Sutera	U	Federal Highway
705	n/a	Klang – Seksyen 14 Shah Alam	Wawasan Sutera	U	Federal Highway
707	414; 16	Klang – Westport	Wawasan Sutera	U	Federal Highway
710	n/a	Klang – Pasar Seni	Wawasan Sutera	U	Federal Highway
711	n/a	Nilai Sentral, Nilai (Nilai Komuter station) – Sungai Pelek	Airport Liner (KR Travel & Tours)	U	Federal Highway
730	127; 60; 720	Banting – Klang	Wawasan Sutera	U	Federal Highway
732	413	Banting – KLIA	Airport Liner (KR Travel & Tours)	U	Federal Highway
733	n/a	Banting – Tanjung Sepat	Wawasan Sutera	U	Federal Highway
734	710	Banting – Pasar Seni	Wawasan Sutera	U	Federal Highway
740	156; 32	Klang – Kuala Selangor	Wawasan Sutera	U	Federal Highway
P701	51K	Kotaraya – Port Klang	Causeway Link (Handal Indah)	U	Federal Highway
T703	400, 401	Klang – Taman Sri Sentosa / Taman Sentosa	Wawasan Sutera	T	Federal Highway
T705	402	Port Klang – Bandar Sultan Sulaiman	Causeway Link (Handal Indah)	T	Federal Highway
T706	136	Port Klang – Telok Gong	Causeway Link (Handal Indah)	T	Federal Highway

== Rail Station Connector Services ==
A transport solution focused on improving accessibility to MRT/LRT stations and their associated bus lines.

=== Trunk & Feeder Bus Lines ===
Route number	Origin	Via	Destination	Rail connectivity	Bus corridor	Notes
250	KJ3 Wangsa Maju	PY18 Hospital Kuala Lumpur; MR10 Chow Kit	AG7 SP7 KJ13 Masjid Jamek	3 4 5 10 12	Jalan Pahang	Direct link between Wangsa Maju and City Centre via Jalan Genting Kelang.
300; 303	AG18 Ampang	KJ9 PY20 Ampang Park; KJ10 KLCC; KJ12 Dang Wangi	AG7 SP7 KJ13 Masjid Jamek	3 4 5 12	Ampang	Direct connection from Ampang to KLCC/City Centre, bypassing the interchange at Masjid Jamek.
506	KT3 PY41 Putrajaya Sentral	SP25 Pusat Bandar Puchong; KJ24 Kelana Jaya	KG09 SA01 Bandar Utama	4 5 7 9 11 12	Sungai Besi	Major trunk line connecting Putrajaya, Puchong, PJ, and Bandar Utama via LDP Highway.
541	PY36 Taman Equine	-	SP22 Kinrara BK5	4 12	Sungai Besi	Connector between MRT Putrajaya Line and LRT Sri Petaling Line via Puncak Jalil.
T402	KG24 Taman Midah	-	SP13 Salak Selatan	4 9	Cheras	Connects MRT Kajang Line and LRT Sri Petaling Line via Bandar Sri Permaisuri.
T410	KG26 Taman Connaught	-	SP15 KB04 KT2 Bandar Tasik Selatan	1 4 7 9	Cheras	Feeder connecting MRT Kajang Line to the TBS transport hub.
T545	PY37 Putra Permai	-	SP28 Puchong Perdana	4 12	Sungai Besi	Connects MRT Putrajaya Line and LRT Sri Petaling Line via Puchong South.
T569	PY33 Serdang Jaya	-	KG30 Batu 11 Cheras	9 12	Sungai Besi	Shortest southern connector between MRT Kajang Line and MRT Putrajaya Line via Balakong.
T786	KJ21 Asia Jaya	-	KG12 Phileo Damansara	5 9	Federal Highway	Connects LRT Kelana Jaya Line and MRT Kajang Line via PJ Section 17.
T807	KG07 Surian	-	KJ25 Lembah Subang	5 9	Damansara	Connects MRT Kajang Line and LRT Kelana Jaya Line via Ara Damansara.
T850	KJ16 Bangsar	-	KG14 Semantan	5 9	Damansara	Connects LRT Kelana Jaya Line and MRT Kajang Line via Maarof/Semantan.
SJ02	SP25 Pusat Bandar Puchong	-	KJ30 SS18	4 9	Federal Highway	Direct link between Puchong and Subang Jaya, bypassing the Putra Heights interchange loop.

== Ceased or unknown operation ==
This were the list of the routes that were temporary suspended, unknown status, not introduced, abandoned or terminated. This may be due to low demand, unreliable routes or taken over by rail systems.

Route number	Destination	Service brands	Operator	Status	Alternative
101	Saujana Utama – KTM Sungai Buloh	Selangor Bus	Selangor Omnibus Co.	terminated	KS02
102	Kundang – KTM Sungai Buloh	Selangor Bus	Selangor Omnibus Co.	terminated	MRT + MPS3 or T154
121	Hab Lebuh Pudu – Taman Sri Sinar	Selangor Bus	Selangor Omnibus Co.	terminated	MRT + T115
122	Hab Lebuh Pudu – Taman Ehsan	Selangor Bus	Selangor Omnibus Co.	terminated	MRT + T107, T110
144/145	Medan Pasar – Taman Subang Baru	Selangor Bus	Selangor Omnibus Co.	terminated	772
144A	Medan Pasar – Hospital Sungai Buloh	Selangor Bus	Selangor Omnibus Co.	terminated	MRT + MPS3 or T100
144B	Medan Pasar – Bandar Sri Damansara	Selangor Bus	Selangor Omnibus Co.	terminated	103, MRT + T106
145A	Medan Pasar – Kota Damansara	Selangor Bus	Selangor Omnibus Co.	terminated	MRT, 780
146	Medan Pasar – Kuang	Selangor Bus	Selangor Omnibus Co.	terminated	MRT + T154
158	Medan Pasar – Bandar Baru Sungai Buloh	Selangor Bus	Selangor Omnibus Co.	terminated	MRT + T101
158B	Medan Pasar – Bukit Rahman Putra	Selangor Bus	Selangor Omnibus Co.	terminated	MRT + T101
153	Bukit Idaman – Kotaraya	SJ Bus	Setara Jaya Bus	terminated	152
155	Rawang – Bandar Tasik Puteri via Country Homes	SJ Bus	Setara Jaya Bus	terminated	
157	Rawang – Sungai Buaya	SJ Bus	Setara Jaya Bus	terminated	156 + HS03
158	Rawang – Ulu Yam via Batang Kali	SJ Bus	Setara Jaya Bus	terminated	150 + HS02
159	Rawang – Saujana Rawang	SJ Bus	Setara Jaya Bus	terminated	
172	Taman Greenwood – Chow Kit via Jalan Sentul	Rapid KL	Rapid Bus	terminated	170, 171, 180
191	Taman Sri Segambut – Chow Kit	Rapid KL	Rapid Bus	terminated	T118B, T119B, T254B & T822B (RapidKL On-Demand); Parallel with 190 from SJKC Khai Chee to Chow Kit.
221	Dato' Keramat LRT station – Ampang Point	Rapid KL	Rapid Bus	terminated	220, 253
252	Seksyen 10 Wangsa Maju – Hab Munshi Abdullah	Len Seng	Len Seng Omnibus Co.	terminated	251, T251
301	Sri Nilam – Taman Midah	Rapid KL	Rapid Bus	terminated	T305
401	Hab Lebuh Pudu – KTM Serdang via Cheras Perdana	Rapid KL	Rapid Bus	terminated	590, MRT
402	Maluri station – Titiwangsa hub	Rapid KL	Rapid Bus	terminated	LRT, MRT, T254B & T822B (RapidKL On-Demand)
451	Bandar Kajang – HAB Lebuh Pudu via Lebuhraya Sungai Besi	Sri Indah	Sri Indah Bus	terminated	450, MRT
451	Kajang – Putrajaya Sentral	Rapid KL	Rapid Bus	terminated	MRT+T569, T466B, T512B, T513B & T514B (RapidKL On-Demand)
452	Bandar Tasik Kesuma – Hab Lebuh Pudu	Rapid KL	Rapid Bus	terminated	T450, 450, MRT
454	Kolej Universiti Islam Selangor (KUIS) – Putrajaya Sentral	Nadi Putra	Pengangkutan Awam Putrajaya Travel & Tours (original operator)	terminated	KJ02
500	Putrajaya Sentral – Hab Lebuh Pudu via Lebuhraya MEX	KR Travel and Tours	KR Travel and Tours	terminated	523, MRT
502	Serdang KTM Station – Putrajaya Sentral	KR Travel and Tours	KR Travel and Tours	terminated	523, MRT
503	Putrajaya Sentral – Puchong Utama via Cyberjaya	Causeway Link	Handal Indah	terminated	T505, T506, SPG3, MRT
505	P&R Presint 14 – IOI Mall Puchong via UNITEN	Nadi Putra	Pengangkutan Awam Putrajaya Travel & Tours (original operator)	terminated	P103, P108, MRT
506	Putrajaya Sentral – Bandar Utama	Rapid KL	Rapid Bus	terminated	MRT, LRT, T780B, T783B, T607B, T640B (RapidKL On-Demand), T811, T812
520	Putrajaya Sentral – Cyberjaya	Nadi Putra	Pengangkutan Awam Putrajaya Travel & Tours (original operator)	terminated	MRT, T504, T505, T506, T507
521	Putrajaya Sentral – Dengkil	Nadi Putra	Pengangkutan Awam Putrajaya Travel & Tours (original operator)	terminated	
540	Putra Permai – KTM Serdang	Rapid KL	Rapid Bus	terminated	MRT, T542B, T563B (RapidKL On-Demand)
551	Seksyen 6 Bangi – Hab Lebuh Pudu	Rapid KL	Rapid Bus	terminated	450, T451, T462, T463, T464, KJ04, MRT
570	UPM – Hab Lebuh Pudu	Rapid KL	Rapid Bus	terminated	SJ04, MRT
603	Taman Mas Sepang – Pasar Seni	Rapid KL	Rapid Bus	terminated	LRT, T603
605	Puchong Utama – Sunway Pyramid	Rapid KL	Rapid Bus	terminated	LRT, BRT
606	IOI Mall Puchong – LRT Kelana Jaya	Rapid KL	Rapid Bus	terminated	LRT
670	PPR Muhibbah – Pasar Seni	Rapid KL	Rapid Bus	terminated	651, LRT
671	Flat Enggang Kinara – Pasar Seni	Rapid KL	Rapid Bus	terminated	LRT
690	Pudu Sentral – Terminal Bersepadu Selatan (TBS)	Rapid KL	Rapid Bus	terminated	LRT, ERL, KTM, T410
701	Port Klang – Pasar Seni / Kotaraya	Causeway Link	Handal Ceria	terminated	P701, KTM
702	Klang – Sri Muda	Seranas	Seranas	terminated	
703	Klang – Puncak Alam	Seranas	Seranas	terminated	
706	Klang – Hentian Pusat Bandar Shah Alam via Sungai Rasau	Wawasan Sutera	Wawasan Sutera	terminated	KTM
708	Klang – Sunway Pyramid via Hentian Bandar	Rapid KL	Rapid Bus	terminated	T724B, T727B, T732B, T733B, T734B, T640B (RapidKL On-Demand); The upcoming LRT Shah Alam line will replace the role for connection between Klang and Shah Alam.
731	Putrajaya Sentral – Banting	Nadi Putra	Pengangkutan Awam Putrajaya Travel & Tours (original operator)	terminated	732
734	Banting – Pasar Seni	CityLiner	Kenderaan Klang-Banting Berhad	terminated	730, 700
735	Sungai Pelek – Terminal Nilai	CityLiner	Kenderaan Klang-Banting Berhad	terminated	KTM, SPG1
781	Taman Medan, PJS 3 – Pasar Seni	Rapid KL	Rapid Bus	terminated	T640, 640, 782, PJ01
800	KL Sentral – Bandar Utama via TTDI	Rapid KL	Rapid Bus	terminated	MRT
801	Bandar Utama – Metro Prima	Rapid KL	Rapid Bus	terminated	MRT, T112B, T113B (RapidKL On-Demand), PJ06
802	Kelana Jaya – Kota Damansara	Rapid KL	Rapid Bus	terminated	MRT, LRT, T805, T807, T808, T780B (RapidKL On-Demand), PJ05; Passengers that rely on a connection between LRT & MRT can take T807 from MRT Surian and LRT Lembah Subang.
850	KL Sentral – Kompleks Mahkamah Jalan Duta via Bukit Damansara	Rapid KL	Rapid Bus	terminated	T850, T852
852	Titiwangsa hub – Solaris Dutamas via PWTC and Bukit Tunku	Rapid KL	Rapid Bus	terminated	851, T821, T852, LRT
P102A	Dataran Gemilang – Presint 11	Rapid KL (Nadiputra Putrajaya)	Rapid Bus	terminated	No alternative bus available after the termination of T512.
P107	Putrajaya Sentral – Dataran Gemilang via Presint 7,9	Rapid KL (Nadiputra Putrajaya)	Rapid Bus	terminated	T511
T111	Sri Damansara Timur MRT station – Taman Daya/Taman Kepong Indah	MRT Corp	Rapid Bus	terminated	MPS4, T110, T113B (RapidKL On-Demand)
T112	Metro Prima MRT station – Taman Kepong	MRT Corp	Rapid Bus	terminated	T112B (RapidKL On-Demand)
T113	Metro Prima MRT station – Kepong Entrepreneurs Park	MRT Corp	Rapid Bus	terminated	GOKL-12, T113B (RapidKL On-Demand)
T118	Sri Delima MRT station – Taman Kok Doh	MRT Corp	Rapid Bus	terminated	T119B (RapidKL On-Demand)
T119	Kentonmen MRT station – Perindustrian Taman Segambut	MRT Corp	Rapid Bus	terminated	T118B (RapidKL On-Demand)
T120	Kompleks Sungai Mas – Taman Mastiara	Rapid KL	Rapid Bus	terminated	GOKL-08
T121	Metro Prima Kepong – Bandar Baru Selayang	Rapid KL	Rapid Bus	terminated	MPS1, T114
T150	Terminal Bas Rawang – Taman Pelangi	SJ Bus	Setara Jaya Bus	terminated	155
T151	Terminal Bas Rawang – Rawang Perdana	SJ Bus	Setara Jaya Bus	terminated	MPS2A
T152	Terminal Bas Rawang – Kuala Garing	SJ Bus	Setara Jaya Bus	terminated	MPS2B
T190	Taman Sri Segambut – Segambut KTM station	Rapid KL	Rapid Bus	terminated	191
T204	Taman Greenwood – Kg Nakhoda via Taman Industri Bolton	Rapid KL	Rapid Bus	terminated	171, 173, MPS1
T252	PPR Sg Bonus, Ayer Panas – Wangsa Maju LRT station via PPR Desa Rejang	Rapid KL	Rapid Bus	terminated	
T403	Cheras Awana – LRT Bandar Tasik Selatan	Rapid KL	Rapid Bus	terminated	T410, T411
T404	Cheras Awana – Taman Midah via Taman Supreme	Rapid KL	Rapid Bus	terminated	T408, T409
T405	Cheras Hartamas – Taman Segar via Taman Mutiara Timur	Rapid KL	Rapid Bus	terminated	T408
T452	KTM Bangi – Kolej Universiti Islam Selangor (KUIS)	Nadi Putra	Pengangkutan Awam Putrajaya Travel & Tours (original operator)	terminated	KJ02
T454	Bukit Dukung MRT station – Kampung Sungai Sekamat	MRT Corp	Rapid Bus	terminated	T454B (RapidKL On-Demand)
T456	Sungai Jernih MRT station – Saujana Impian	MRT Corp	Rapid Bus	terminated	T456B (RapidKL On-Demand)
T508	Putrajaya Sentral MRT station – Presint 10	MRT Corp	Rapid Bus	terminated	P102, T512B (RapidKL On-Demand)
T510	Putrajaya Sentral MRT station – Ayer 8	MRT Corp	Rapid Bus	terminated	P105, T512B (RapidKL On-Demand)
T512	Putrajaya Sentral MRT station – Presint 11	MRT Corp	Rapid Bus	terminated	P102, T512B (RapidKL On-Demand)
T513	Putrajaya Sentral MRT station – Ministry of Transport	MRT Corp	Rapid Bus	terminated	T511
T520	Cyberjaya Street Mall – Limkokwing University of Creative Technology	Nadi Putra	Pengangkutan Awam Putrajaya Travel & Tours (original operator)	abandoned	MRT, T504, T505
T521	Cyberia – Putrajaya Sentral via Cyber Height	Nadi Putra	Pengangkutan Awam Putrajaya Travel & Tours (original operator)	abandoned	MRT, T505, T506, T507
T542	Taman Equine MRT station – Taman Pinggiran Putra	MRT Corp	Rapid Bus	terminated	540, T542B (RapidKL On-Demand)
T562	Serdang Raya Utara MRT station – Serdang Perdana	MRT Corp	Rapid Bus	terminated	T563B (RapidKL On-Demand)
T563	Serdang Raya Utara MRT station – TPM & Bukit Jalil	MRT Corp	Rapid Bus	terminated	T563B (RapidKL On-Demand); Passengers that relies a rail connection between LRT and MRT can make an interchange at Sungai Besi.
T564	Serdang Raya Selatan MRT station – Kampung Baru Seri Kembangan	MRT Corp	Rapid Bus	terminated	SJ05, T563B (RapidKL On-Demand)
T570	Serdang KTM Station – UPM	Rapid KL	Rapid Bus	terminated	SJ04, T566, T567, T568
T581B	Alam Sutera LRT station - PPR Pinggiran Bukit Jalil via Taman LTAT	Rapid KL	Rapid Bus	terminated	Merged with T580
T582	Sri Petaling LRT station – Bandar Baru Sri Petaling via Bukit Jalil LRT station	Rapid KL	Rapid Bus	terminated	652, T580
T583	Awan Besar LRT station – Kuchai Lama	Rapid KL	Rapid Bus	terminated	651, 652
T584	Salak Selatan LRT station – Desa Petaling	Rapid KL	Rapid Bus	terminated	580
T602	Puchong Utama – Taman Saujana Puchong	Rapid KL	Rapid Bus	terminated	T607B (RapidKL On-Demand)
T700	Klang – Kampung Delek via Sungai Udang	Wawasan Sutera	Wawasan Sutera	terminated	T723B (RapidKL On-Demand)
T701	Klang – Kampung Delek via Jalan Yadi	Wawasan Sutera	Wawasan Sutera	terminated	T723B (RapidKL On-Demand)
T702	Klang – Taman Sri Sentosa	Wawasan Sutera	Wawasan Sutera	terminated	T718B (RapidKL On-Demand)
T704	Klang – Port Klang	Causeway Link	Handal Ceria	terminated	
T712	Klang – Bandar Bukit Tinggi	Serenas	Serenas	terminated	T717B (RapidKL On-Demand)
T713	Klang – Taman Klang Utama	Serenas	Serenas	terminated	
T716	Klang – Teluk Pulai via Jalan Raya Barat	Wawasan Sutera	Wawasan Sutera	terminated	T723B (RapidKL On-Demand)
T730	Terminal Banting – Bukit Cheeding	Wawasan Sutera	Wawasan Sutera	terminated	
T731	Terminal Banting – Sungai Buaya	Wawasan Sutera	Wawasan Sutera	terminated	
T750	Seksyen 2, Shah Alam – UITM Shah Alam	Rapid KL	Rapid Bus	terminated	SA01, SA04
T751	Seksyen 7, Shah Alam – UITM Shah Alam	Rapid KL	Rapid Bus	terminated	SA04
T752	Seksyen 2, Shah Alam – Seksyen 13, Shah Alam	Rapid KL	Rapid Bus	terminated	SA01, SA02, SA04
T755	Hentian Pusat Bandar Shah Alam – Batu Tiga KTM station via Taman Subang Mas	Rapid KL	Rapid Bus	terminated	SA02, SA07
T758	Subang Alam LRT station – Seksyen 28, Shah Alam	Rapid KL	Rapid Bus	terminated	752
T759	Putra Heights LRT station – Kg Bukit Lanchong	Rapid KL	Rapid Bus	terminated	752
T760	Putra Heights LRT station – Bandar Saujana Putra	Nadi Putra	Pengangkutan Awam Putrajaya Travel & Tours (original operator); Operation transferred to Mitways Transport and Tours Sdn Bhd	terminated	T736B (RapidKL On-Demand)
T770	Subang Jaya station – Sunway Pyramid via SS15 LRT station	Rapid KL	Rapid Bus	terminated	SJ01
T771	Subang Bestari – Subang Perdana	Rapid KL	Rapid Bus	terminated	T803
T773	Ara Damansara LRT station – Subang Airport	Rapid KL	Rapid Bus	terminated	T782, T807, 772
T777	Taipan LRT Station – USJ 10, Taipan via Wawasan LRT station	Rapid KL	Rapid Bus	terminated	770, T776
T784	Taman Bahagia LRT station – Damansara Utama	Rapid KL	Rapid Bus	terminated	T813, 780, 802, PJ05
T792	USJ7 station – SS19	Rapid KL LRT Feeder Bus	Rapid Bus	terminated	771, SJ01
T800	Bandar Utama – Pelangi Damansara	Rapid KL	Rapid Bus	terminated	MRT
T806	Kota Damansara MRT station – Selangor Science Park	MRT Corp	Rapid Bus	terminated	T805
T819	Semantan MRT station – KL Sentral via Segambut KTM station	MRT Corp	Rapid Bus	terminated	T822B (RapidKL On-Demand)
T820	Semantan MRT station – Menara DBKL	MRT Corp	Rapid Bus	terminated	T822B (RapidKL On-Demand); Passengers from Semantan to DBKL can take the MRT, make an interchange at Merdeka to take the LRT to Bandaraya.
KJ04	Hentian Kajang – Dataran Gemilang, Putrajaya via Bandar Baru Bangi (original route)	Smart Selangor	Rapid Bus	route amended and no longer through Putrajaya	KTM+ERL or MRT
KJ05	Hentian Kajang – Seksyen 8, Bandar Baru Bangi	Smart Selangor	Rapid Bus	terminated	T462, KJ04
SPG3	Pekan Salak - Cyberjaya Transport Terminal via Taman Seroja	Smart Selangor	Causeway Link (Handal Indah)	terminated	T591B (RapidKL On-Demand); T504, T505, T506, T507
SPG4	Pusat Penjaja Taman Seroja - IOI City Mall via Serdang Hospital	Smart Selangor	Causeway Link (Handal Indah)	terminated	T466B (RapidKL On-Demand), Trek Rides DRT (UPM-Serdang); 523
DS01	Ampang LRT station – KLCC	Rapid KL	Rapid Bus	terminated	300
E1	KLIA/KLIA2 – Putra Heights via NKVE Highway	Rapid KL Airport Shuttle	Rapid Bus	terminated	LNH Jetbus Airport Shuttle
BET1	Kota Damansara – Pasar Seni via Penchala Link	Rapid KL	Rapid Bus	terminated	MRT，780
BET2	Bandar Sungai Long – Hab Lebuh Pudu via Cheras – Kajang Expressway	Rapid KL	Rapid Bus	terminated	590
BET3	Subang Mewah USJ1 – Pasar Seni via New Pantai Expressway	Rapid KL	Rapid Bus	terminated	770, LRT
BET4	Taman Sri Muda – Pasar Seni via New Pantai Expressway	Rapid KL	Rapid Bus	terminated	751
BET6	Kotaraya – Bukit Beruntung via North-South Expressway	SJ Bus	Setara Jaya Bus	terminated	157
BET8	Semenyih Sentral – Hab Lebuh Pudu via Kajang-Seremban Expressway	Rapid KL	Rapid Bus	terminated	
BET9	Kotaraya – Rawang via North-South Expressway	SJ Bus	Setara Jaya Bus	terminated	150
BET10	Terminal Pekeliling – Kuala Selangor via LATAR	Selangor Bus	Selangor Omnibus Co.	terminated	100
BET11	Banting – Kotaraya via New Pantai Expressway	CityLiner	Kenderaan Klang – Banting Berhad	terminated	700, 730
BET12	Putrajaya Sentral – Kota Warisan via Dengkil	Nadi Putra	Pengangkutan Awam Putrajaya Travel & Tours (original operator)	terminated	ERL, SPG2
BET13	Putrajaya Sentral – KTM Serdang via Persiaran Utara	Nadi Putra	Pengangkutan Awam Putrajaya Travel & Tours (original operator)	terminated	502
BET14	Putrajaya Sentral – Bandar Baru Salak Tinggi via ELITE	Nadi Putra	Pengangkutan Awam Putrajaya Travel & Tours (original operator)	terminated	ERL, SPG2
BET15	Putrajaya Sentral – Bandar Saujana Putra via SKVE	Nadi Putra	Pengangkutan Awam Putrajaya Travel & Tours (original operator)	terminated	503
A	Stesen KTM Kajang – IOI City Mall Putrajaya via Kompleks PKNS Bangi	LNH Littlebus	LNH Transportation and Service Centre	terminated	KTM -> 523
B	Pekan Kajang – Beranang	LNH Littlebus	LNH Transportation and Service Centre	terminated	T450
C	KPTM MFI, UKM – Pekan Kajang	LNH Littlebus	LNH Transportation and Service Centre	terminated	T451
Mid Valley	Mid Valley – Bank Rakyat-Bangsar LRT station	Causeway Link	Handal Indah	terminated	LRT
C1 (Paradigm Mall Shuttle)	Kelana Jaya LRT station – Paradigm Mall	Rapid KL	Rapid Bus	terminated	T781
L02	Putrajaya Sentral – Presint 9 – Presint 8 – Kompleks ABCDE – Alamanda – Presint 14 – Presint 15	Nadi Putra	Pengangkutan Awam Putrajaya Travel & Tours (original operator)	terminated	T509, T511, P101, P103, P108
L03	Putrajaya Sentral – Presint 9 – Ayer@8 – Presint 2, 3 – Presint 18 – Wisma Putra	Nadi Putra	Pengangkutan Awam Putrajaya Travel & Tours (original operator)	terminated	T509, T511, P101
L04	Putrajaya Sentral – Presint 9 – Presint 2, 3, 4 – Dataran Gemilang – PICC – Presint 5 – Presint 6	Nadi Putra	Pengangkutan Awam Putrajaya Travel & Tours (original operator)	terminated	T509, T511, P101, P105
L07	Putrajaya Sentral – Presint 9 – Presint 11 – Presint 10 – Kompleks ABCDE – Alamanda	Nadi Putra	Pengangkutan Awam Putrajaya Travel & Tours (original operator)	terminated	
L08	Putrajaya Sentral – Presint 9 – Presint 11 – Presint 10 – Presint 8 – Presint 2, 3, 4 – Dataran Gemilang	Nadi Putra	Pengangkutan Awam Putrajaya Travel & Tours (original operator)	terminated	
L15	Putrajaya Sentral – Dataran Gemilang – Presint 2, 3, 4 – Kompleks ABCDE	Nadi Putra	Pengangkutan Awam Putrajaya Travel & Tours (original operator)	terminated	
D03/D04	Jalan P9F – Jalan P9C/1 – Jalan P8H – Jalan Presint 8 – Kompleks ABCDE	Nadi Putra	Pengangkutan Awam Putrajaya Travel & Tours (original operator)	terminated	
D05/D06	Jalan P9F – Jalan P9C/1 – P8H (Ayer@8) – Presint 2, 3, 4 – Dataran Gemilang	Nadi Putra	Pengangkutan Awam Putrajaya Travel & Tours (original operator)	terminated	
D09/D10	Presint 11 – Kompleks ABCDE via Persiaran Utara/Lebuh Perdana Barat	Nadi Putra	Pengangkutan Awam Putrajaya Travel & Tours (original operator)	terminated	
D11/D12	Presint 11 – Dataran Gemilang via Lebuh Sentosa and Lebuh Wawasan	Nadi Putra	Pengangkutan Awam Putrajaya Travel & Tours (original operator)	terminated	
D13/D14	Presint 14 – Presint 15 – Kompleks ABCDE – Presint 2, 3, 4 – Dataran Gemilang	Nadi Putra	Pengangkutan Awam Putrajaya Travel & Tours (original operator)	terminated	
S01+D01/D02	Putrajaya Sentral – Jalan P9 (Putra Harmoni) – Kompleks ABCDE via Lebuh Perdana Barat	Nadi Putra	Pengangkutan Awam Putrajaya Travel & Tours (original operator)	terminated	
S02	Putrajaya Sentral – Dataran Gemilang – Presint 4,5 (Kementerian Pelancongan) via Lebuh Sentosa	Nadi Putra	Pengangkutan Awam Putrajaya Travel & Tours (original operator)	terminated	

== See also ==
- Prasarana Malaysia
- Public transport in Kuala Lumpur
- Buses in Kuala Lumpur
- List of bus routes in Johor Bahru
