= 11/3 =

11/3 may refer to:

- November 3 (month-day date notation)
- March 11 (day-month date notation)
- 11 shillings and 3 pence in UK predecimal currency
- A type of hendecagram
- 2004 Madrid train bombings
- 2011 Tōhoku earthquake and tsunami
  - Fukushima Daiichi nuclear disaster, caused by the earthquake and tsunami

== See also ==
- 3/11 (disambiguation)
- 113 (disambiguation)
