= Puchong Perdana LRT station =

Railway station in Puchong Perdana, Malaysia

SP28 Puchong Perdana

General information
- Other names: Malay: ڤوچوڠ ڤردان (Jawi); Chinese: 蒲种柏兰岭; Tamil: பூச்சோங் பெர்டானா
- Location: Persiaran Puchong Perdana, Taman Puchong Perdana, 47100 Puchong; Selangor; Malaysia
- Coordinates: 3°0′28.0″N 101°36′17.9″E
- System: Rapid KL
- Owner: Prasarana Malaysia
- Operator: Rapid Rail
- Line: 4 Sri Petaling Line
- Platforms: 2 side platforms
- Tracks: 2

Construction
- Structure type: Elevated
- Parking: Not available

Other information
- Station code: SP28

History
- Opened: 30 June 2016; 10 years ago

Services
Preceding station		Following station
Bandar Puteri towards Sentul Timur	Sri Petaling Line	Puchong Prima towards Putra Heights
Location

Puchong Perdana LRT station is a Malaysian light rapid transit (LRT) station in Puchong Perdana, a township of Puchong, Selangor. It is served by the LRT Sri Petaling Line under the Rapid KL network. The station accommodates 2 side platforms with 2 tracks. Like most other LRT stations operating in the Klang Valley, this station is elevated.

The station is on Persiaran Puchong Perdana. It is situated next to Kompleks Puchong Perdana, as well as the local landmark, Masjid As-Salam Puchong Perdana and Taman Tasik Puchong Perdana. The Hilton Garden Inn Puchong and M Square shopping mall are also just a short drive from the station. It mainly serves the residents of Puchong Perdana and Puchong Indah.

The station is a part of the LRT Sri Petaling Line Extension Project (LEP) announced in 2006. The station was opened on 30 June 2016 along with the rest of the stations in the extension project.

== Bus Services ==
=== Feeder buses ===
Route No.	Origin	Destination	Via	Connecting to
T601	SP29 Puchong Prima; SP28 Puchong Perdana	Puchong Utama	Persiaran Puchong Permai; Persiaran Puchong Perdana; Jalan PU 6/1; Persiaran Puchong Utama; Jalan PU 7/1	503, 600, 601, 608, T602
T545	PY37 Putra Permai (Entrance A)	Puchong Utama	Puchong Indah; SP28 Puchong Perdana	T544

=== Other buses ===
Route No.	Origin	Destination	Via
602	SP24 IOI Puchong Jaya	Puchong Prima	Tesco Puchong; Setiawalk Puchong; Puteri Boulevard; Tractors Malaysia; SP28 Puchong Perdana; SP29 Puchong Prima; Pangasapuri Lily; Pangsapuri Melor

== Gallery ==
The platforms and tracks at night in September 2026, with platform screen doors currently being installed.

A Sri Petaling Line train at the platform in September 2026
