= 311 =

311 may refer to:

- 311 (number), a natural number
- AD 311, a year of the Julian calendar, in the fourth century AD
- 311 BC, a year of the pre-Julian Roman calendar
- 311 (band), an American band
  - 311 (album), band 311's self-titled album
- 311 (DSM-IV), DSM-IV code for "Depressive Disorder Not Otherwise Specified"
- 311 Boyz, a teen gang in Las Vegas, Nevada
- 311 Claudia, a main-belt asteroid
- 3-1-1, the telephone number of local information service operated by some local governments in the United States and Canada
- 3-1-1 for Carry-Ons, a procedure enacted by the United States Transportation Security Administration
- 311 earthquake, the 2011 Tōhoku earthquake and tsunami off Japan
- 311, the area code of a common fictitious telephone number (311-555-2368) used in early Bell System ads and in fiction
- For the KKK code '311', see the list of symbols designated by the Anti-Defamation League as hate symbols

== See also ==
- Class 311 (disambiguation)
- 3/11 (disambiguation)
