= Class 311 =

Class 311 may refer to:

- 311 series, an electric train type operated in Japan
- British Rail Class 311, an electric train type formerly operated in the UK
- Renfe Class 311, a diesel locomotive type operated in Spain

== See also ==
- 311 (disambiguation)
