= Johan Setia LRT station =

Rapid transit station in Malaysia

SA26 Johan Setia
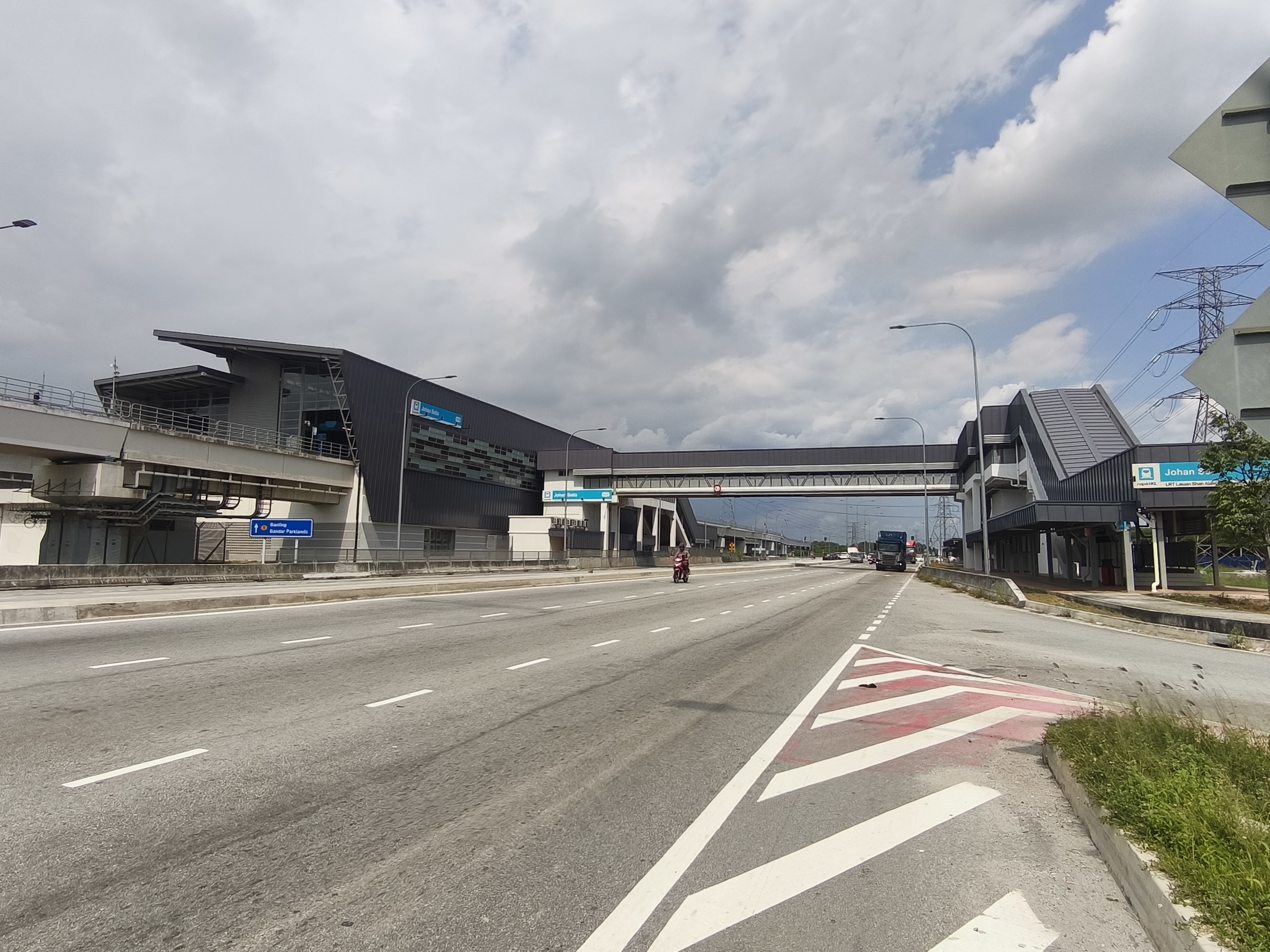

General information
- Other names: Malay: جوهن ستيا (Jawi); Chinese: 佐汉瑟迪亚; Tamil: ஜொகான் செத்தியா
- Location: Jalan Klang-Banting, Kampung Johan Setia, 41200 Klang; Selangor; Malaysia
- Coordinates: 2.9763°N 101.4594°E
- System: Rapid KL
- Owner: Prasarana Malaysia
- Operator: Rapid Rail
- Line: 11 Shah Alam Line
- Platforms: 1 island platform
- Tracks: 2

Construction
- Structure type: Elevated
- Parking: Available, 550 parking bays.
- Accessible: Yes

Other information
- Station code: SA26

History
- Opened: 29 June 2026; 3 months ago

Services
Preceding station		Following station
Bandar Bukit Tinggi towards Bandar Utama	Shah Alam Line	Terminus
Bandar Botanik towards Bandar Utama	Shah Alam Line Future service	Terminus
Location

The Johan Setia LRT station is an elevated light rapid transit (LRT) station in Johan Setia, Klang, Selangor, Malaysia, forming part of the LRT Shah Alam Line. Operations for this station, and subsequently the Shah Alam Line, began on 29 June 2026.

== Station features ==
=== Station layout ===
Unlike most other stations on the Shah Alam Line, Johan Setia only has two floors. The concourse and exits are both on the ground floor rather than on separate floors, while the platforms are still on the floor above the concourse—this makes for a total of two floors.

Like many other stations on the Rapid KL network, this station has facilities designed for the disabled, such as tactile floor blocks, disabled toilets, braille on elevator buttons, and low-height elevator buttons and customer service counters for wheelchair users.

To the east of Entrance A is the station's Park N' Ride facility, which can hold up to 518 vehicles.

L1	Platform 1	11 Shah Alam Line towards SA01 Bandar Utama (←)
L1	Island platform
L1	Platform 2	11 Shah Alam Line towards SA01 Bandar Utama (←)
G	Concourse	Ticketing machines, fare gates, customer service centre, convenience stores, entrances, Park N' Ride, bus stop, taxi stand

=== Platforms ===
This station uses an island platform layout, though instead of having one platform for alighting only and another for boarding only, both platforms are used for boarding and alighting, similar to Titiwangsa and KL Sentral on the KL Monorail.

=== Entrances ===
Entrance	Location	Destination	Picture
A	Jalan Klang – Banting (East)	Feeder bus stop, taxi and private vehicle lay-by, Park N' Ride, Johan Setia Depot, Kampung Johan Setia	
B	Jalan Klang – Banting (West)	Feeder bus stop, taxi and private vehicle lay-by, Kota Bayuemas, Bandar Parklands	

== History ==
This is the twenty-sixth station along the RM9 billion line project, with the line's maintenance depot located just after the station. It is the southern terminus of the LRT line. It has facilities such as kiosks, restrooms, elevators, taxi stands, and bus stops.

== Surrounding developments ==
Major landmarks and developments in the vicinity of this station include:

- Bandar Parklands (Bandar Bukit Tinggi 3)
- Bandar Bestari (Canary Garden)
- Kota Bayuemas
- SAZEAN Business Park
- Masjid Al-Hidayah Kampung Johan Setia
- KSL Esplanade Mall
- Serviced apartments at Gravit 8 @ Klang South (The Tresor, Nordica, Ashino, Adria, Andaman)

== Bus Services ==
There are no feeder bus services from this station. It is served by the Wawasan Sutera city bus route 730 (to Klang and Banting). For Banting-bound passengers, they can board the bus from the nearby bus stop on Jalan Langat (Jalan Klang-Banting) near Kota Bayuemas.

=== On-demand routes ===
Rapid KL On-Demand van routes are available at this station.

Route No.	Origin	Destination	Via	Booking App
T707B	SA26 Johan Setia	Bandar Bestari		Rapid On-Demand
T708B	SA26 Johan Setia	Telok Panglima Garang		Rapid On-Demand
T709B	SA26 Johan Setia	Rimbayu		Rapid On-Demand
T710B	SA26 Johan Setia	Taman Pendamar Indah		Rapid On-Demand

== Gallery ==
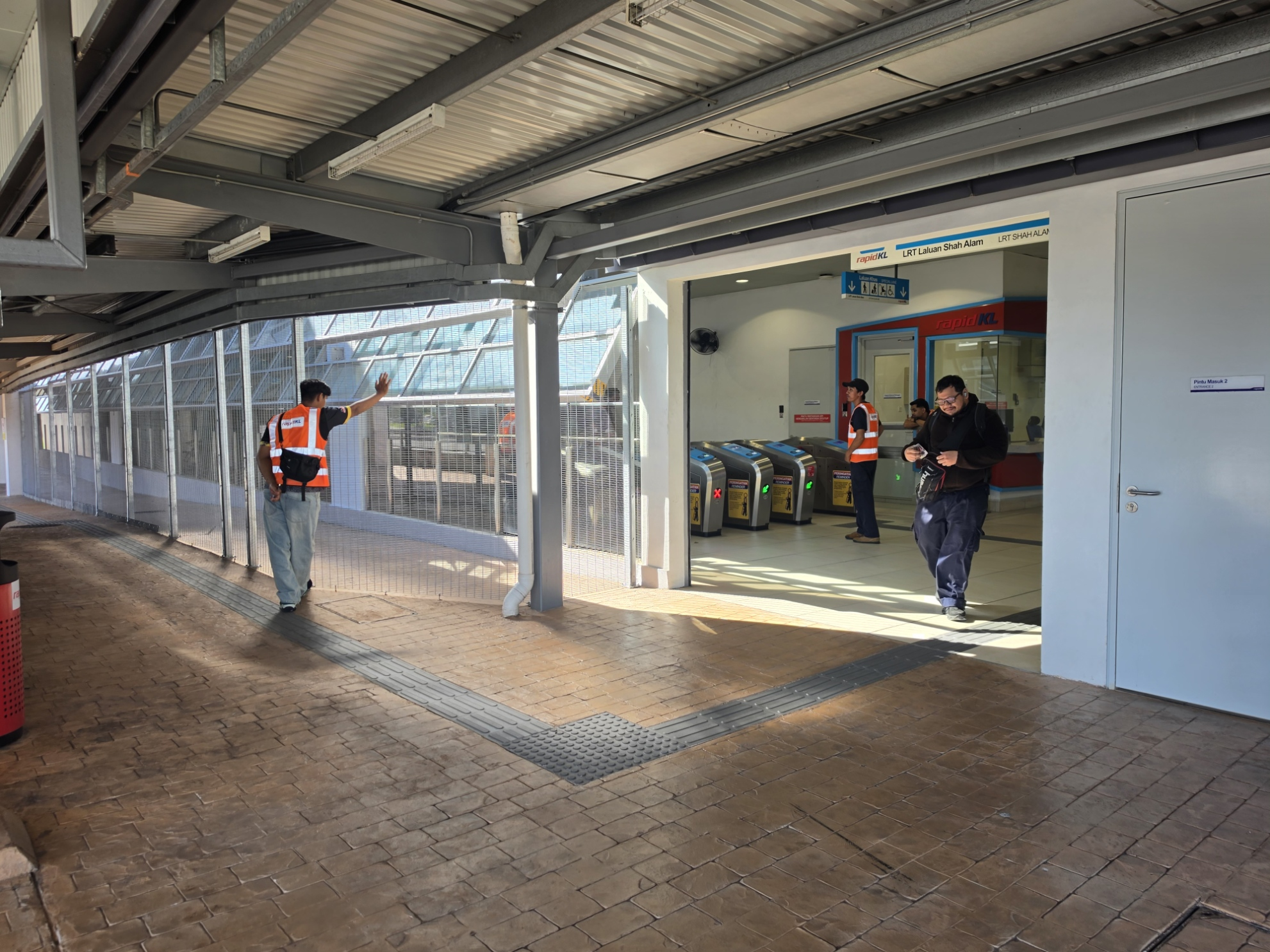
The station's Entrance A

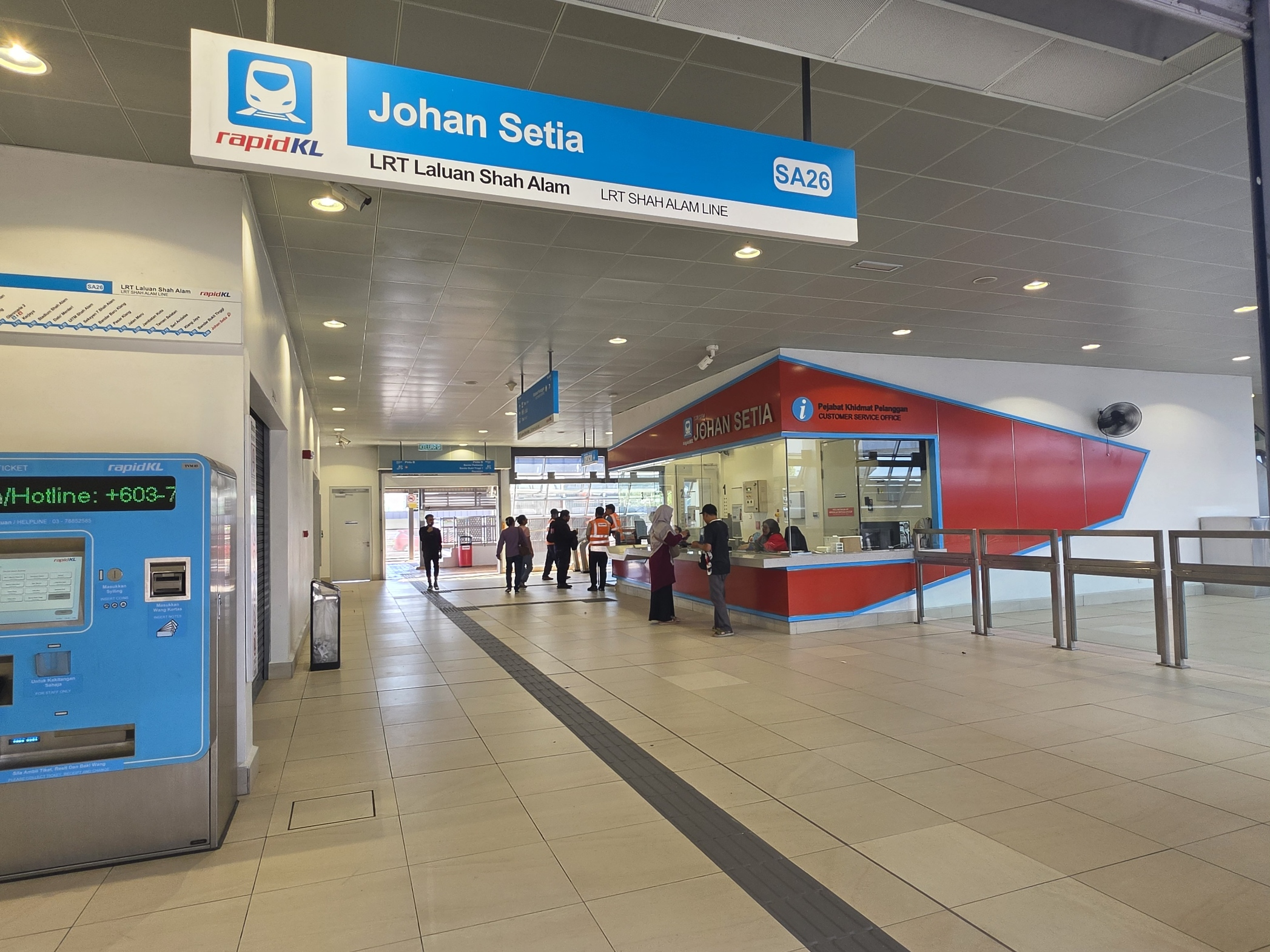
The station's concourse area

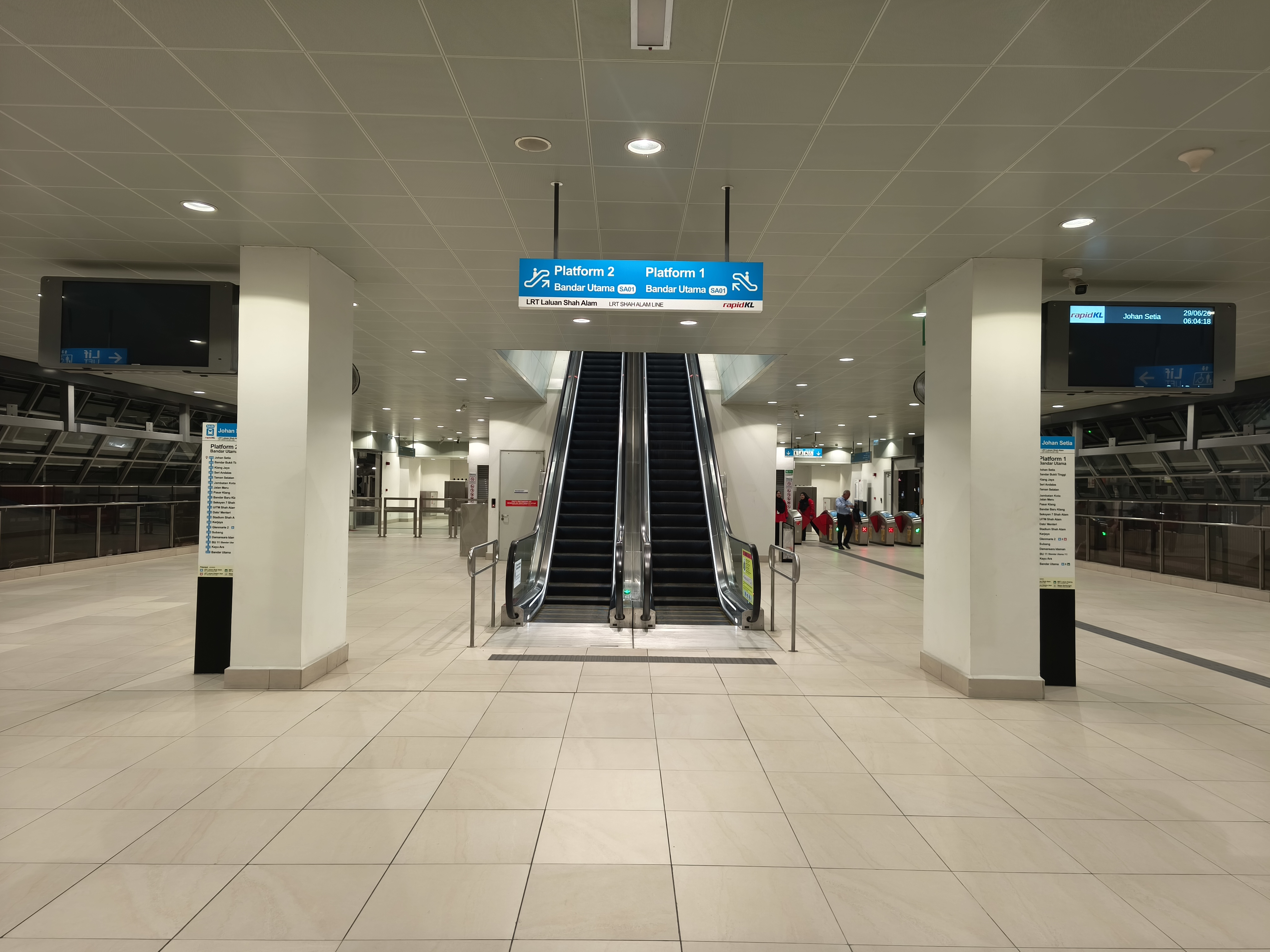
The station's concourse view at night

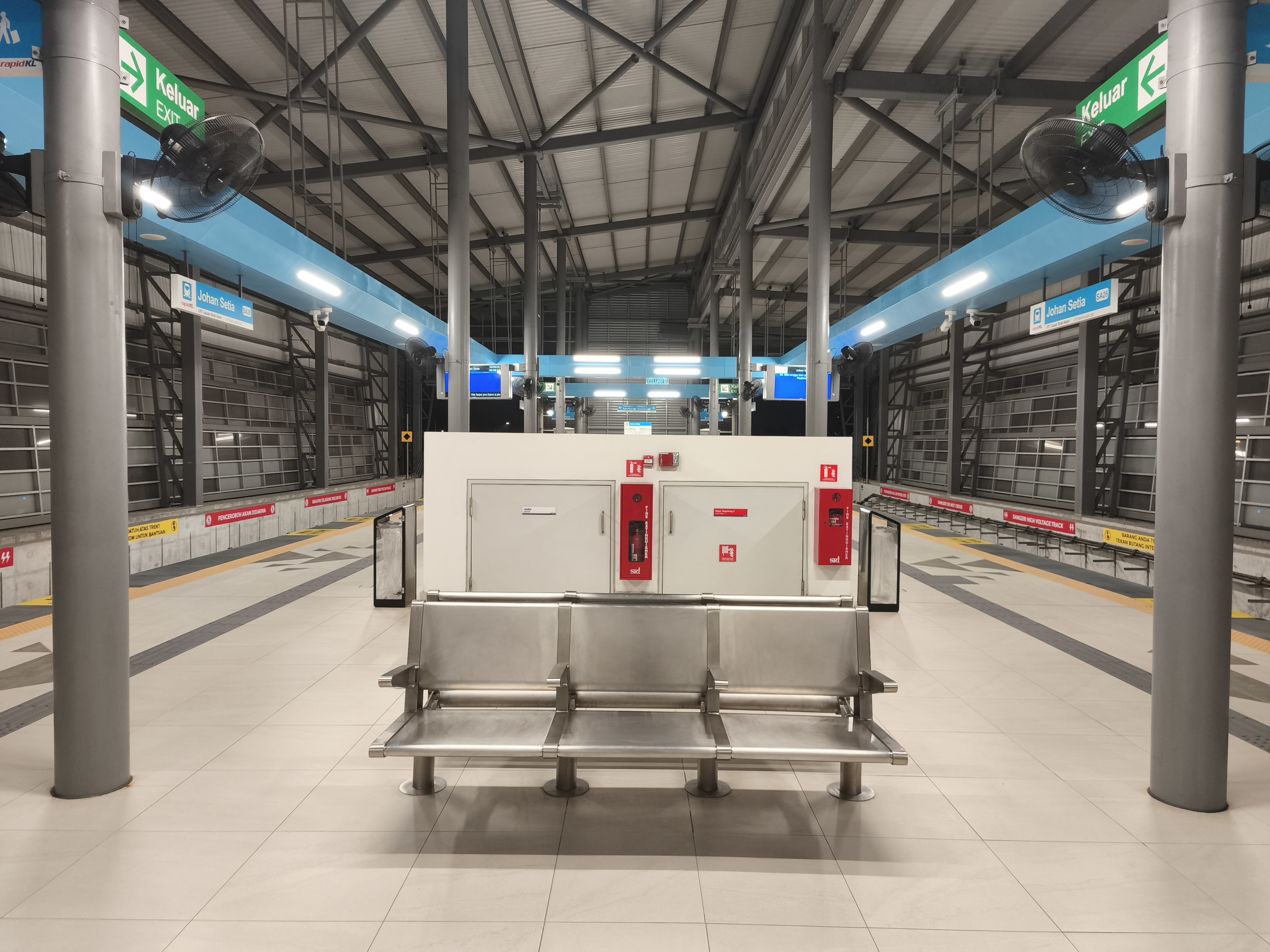
The station's platform view at night

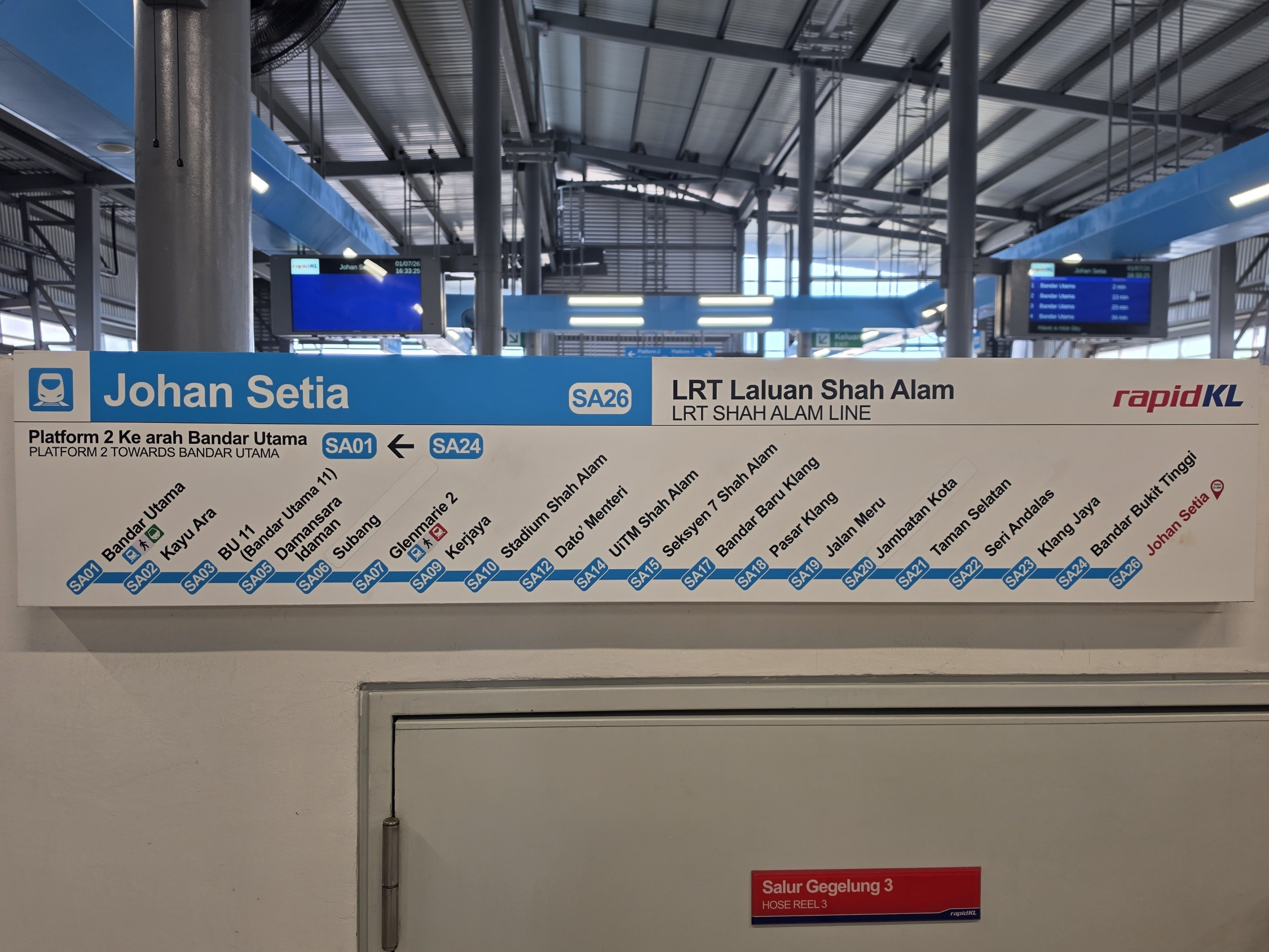
Shah Alam Line signage

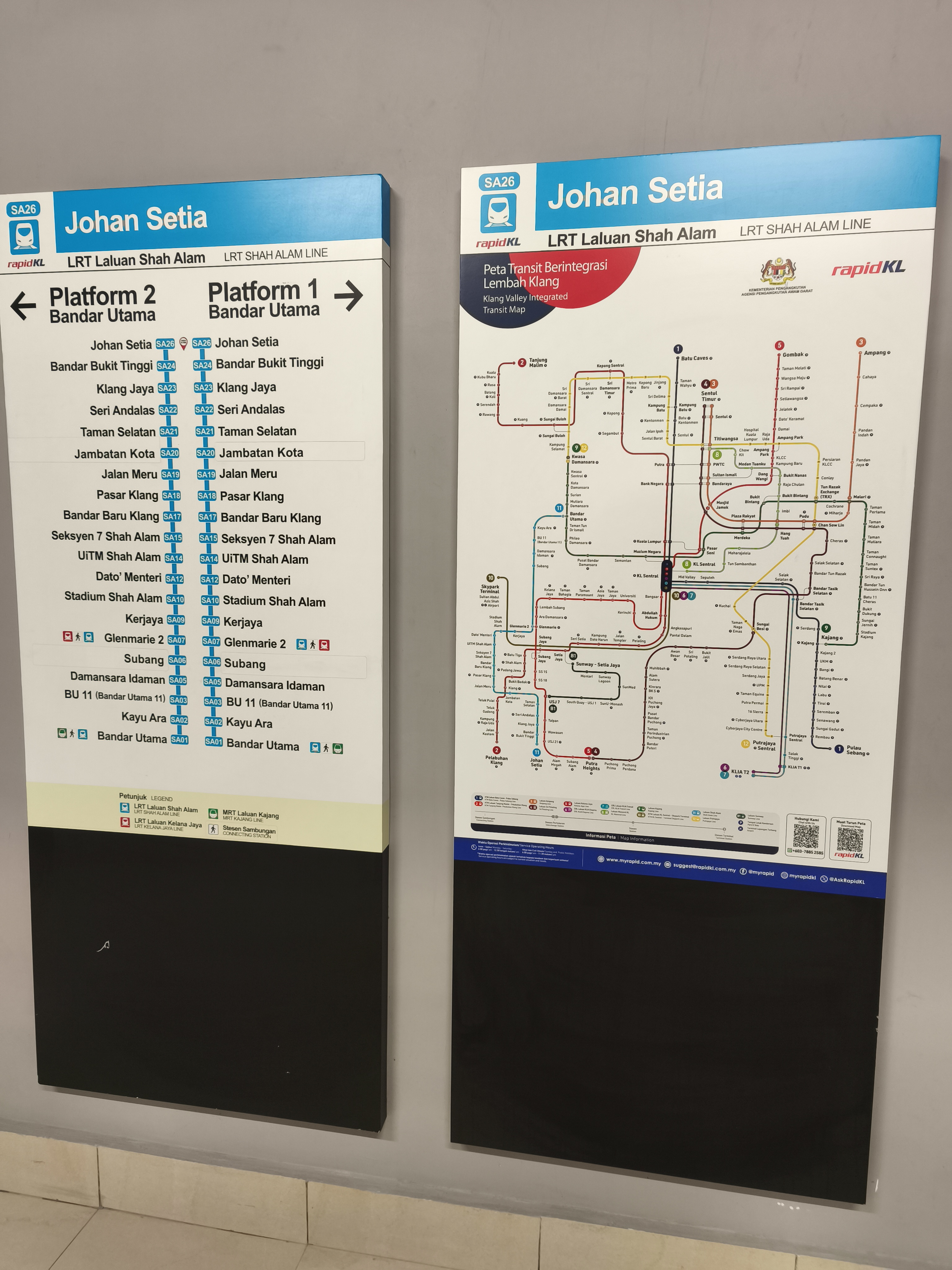
Transit map at the station

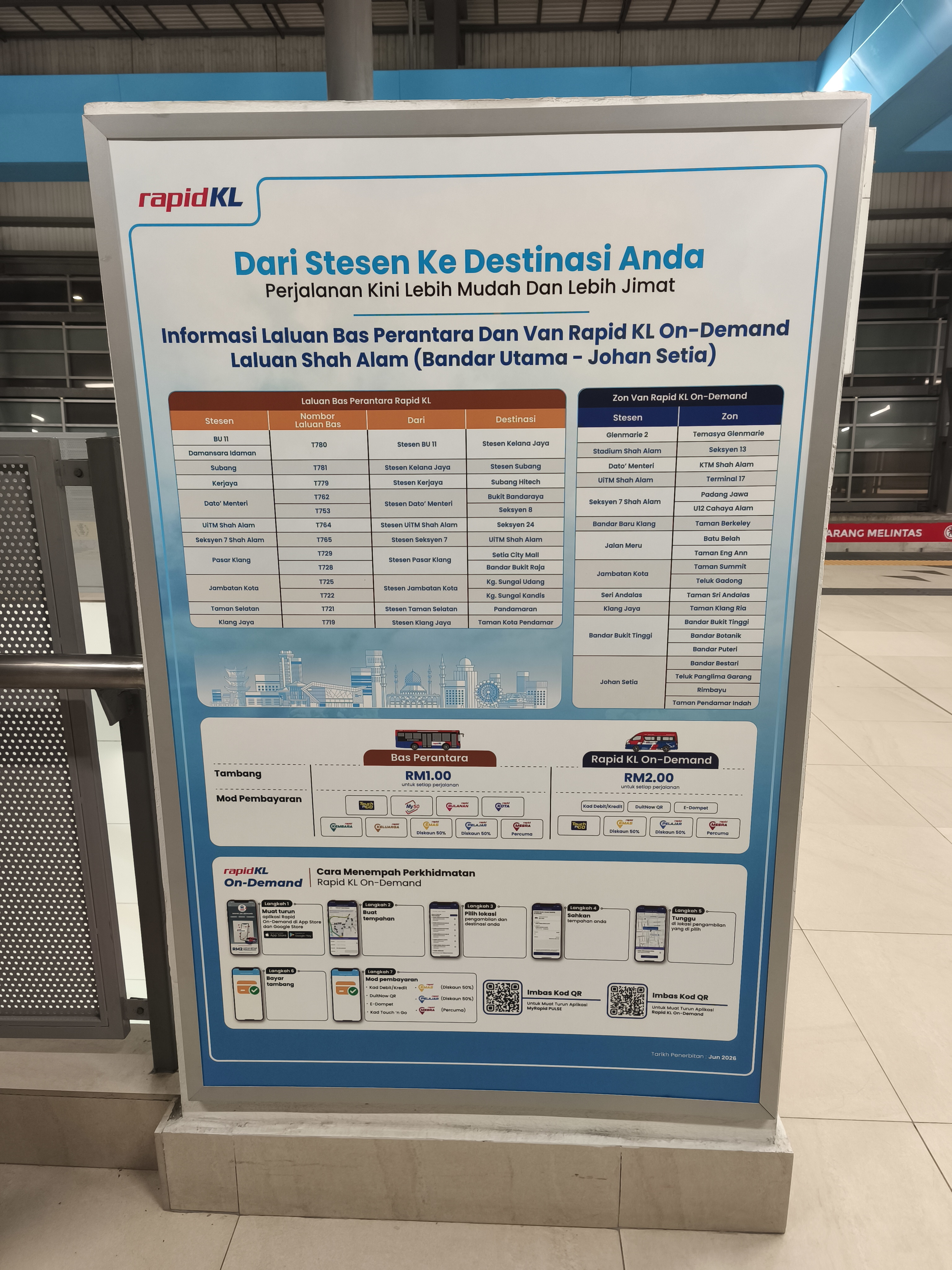
Information board on last mile connectivity

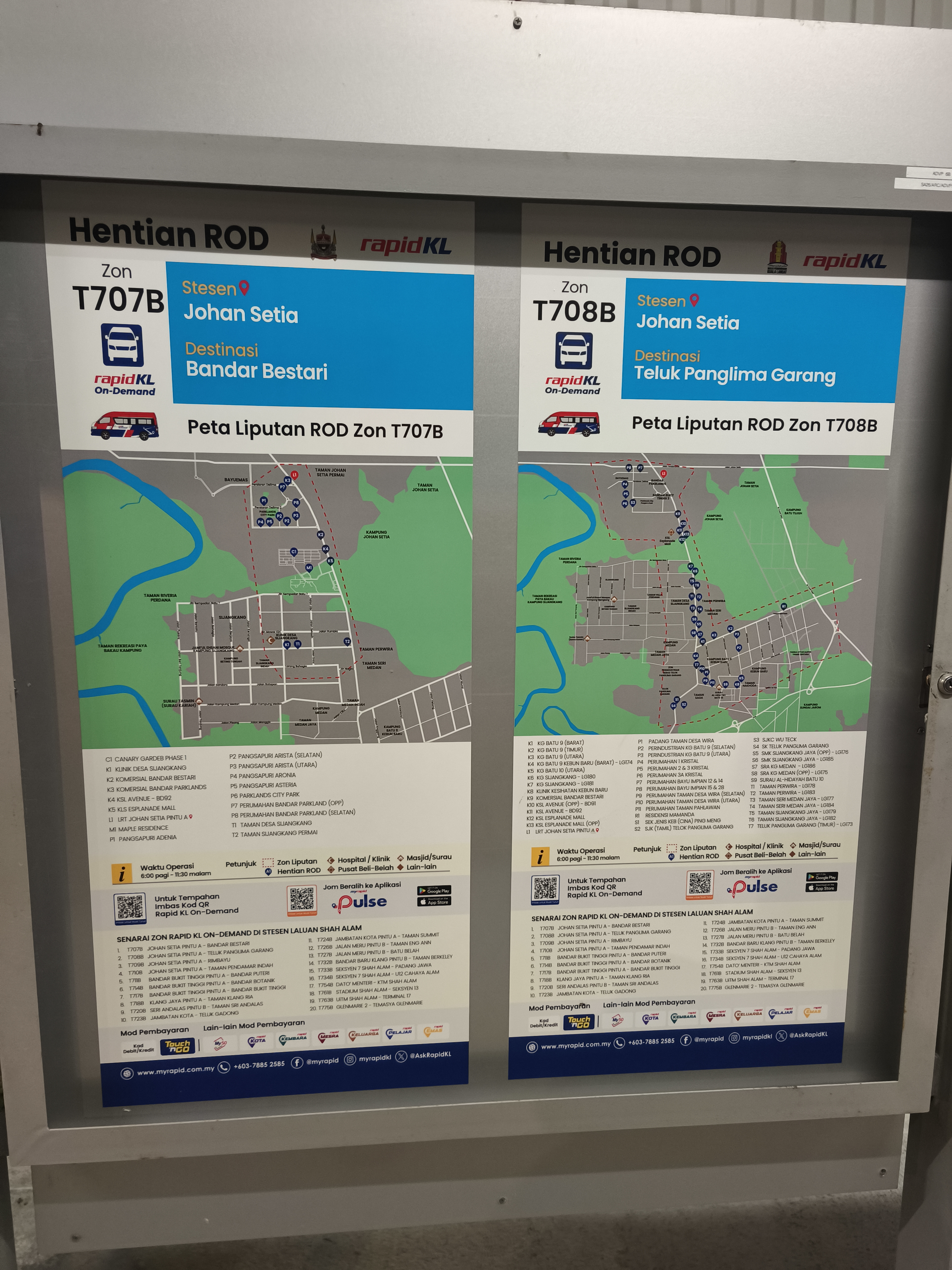
On-demand bus route map
