= 113 =

113 may refer to:

- 113 (number), the natural number following 112 and preceding 114
- AD 113, a year
- 113 BC, a year
- 113 (band), a French hip hop group
- 113 (New Jersey bus), Ironbound Garage in Newark and run to and from the Port Authority bus route
- 113 Amalthea, a main-belt asteroid

== See also ==
- 11/3 (disambiguation)
- Nihonium, synthetic chemical element with atomic number 113
