= T13 =

T13 or T-13 may refer to:

== Aviation ==
- Slingsby T.13 Petrel, a British glider
- Vultee BT-13A Valiant, an American military trainer

== Rail and transit ==
=== Lines ===
- Île-de-France tramway Line 13 Express
- Line 13, part of the Red Line (Stockholm Metro), in Sweden

=== Locomotives ===
- Prussian T 13, a steam locomotive

=== Stations ===
- Karasuma Oike Station, Kyoto, Japan
- Kawana Station (Nagoya), Aichi Prefecture, Japan
- Kiba Station, Tokyo, Japan
- Nibu Station, Higashikagawa, Kagawa Prefecture, Japan
- Shiroishi Station (Sapporo Municipal Subway), Hokkaido, Japan
- Taishibashi-Imaichi Station, Osaka, Japan

== Weapons and armor ==
- BEANO T-13 grenade, an American hand grenade
- T-13 tank destroyer, a Belgian tank destroyer

== Other uses ==
- T13 (classification), a disability sport classification
- Estonian national road 13
- T13 road (Tanzania)
- German torpedo boat T13
- Patau syndrome, also known as trisomy 13
- Port Sorell language
- Soyuz T-13, a crewed spaceflight
- Teletrece, also known as T13, a Chilean news programme
