= 3/11 =

3/11 may refer to:

- March 11, in month-day date notation
- 3 November, in day-month date notation
- 3rd Battalion, 11th Marines
- March, 11 A.D.; see AD 11
- November, 3 A.D.; see 0s
- 2011 Tōhoku earthquake and tsunami
  - Fukushima Daiichi nuclear disaster, caused by the earthquake and tsunami
- 2004 Madrid train bombings

== See also ==
- 311 (disambiguation)
- Windows 3.11
