= Bangi Komuter station =

Train station in Malaysia

Bangi

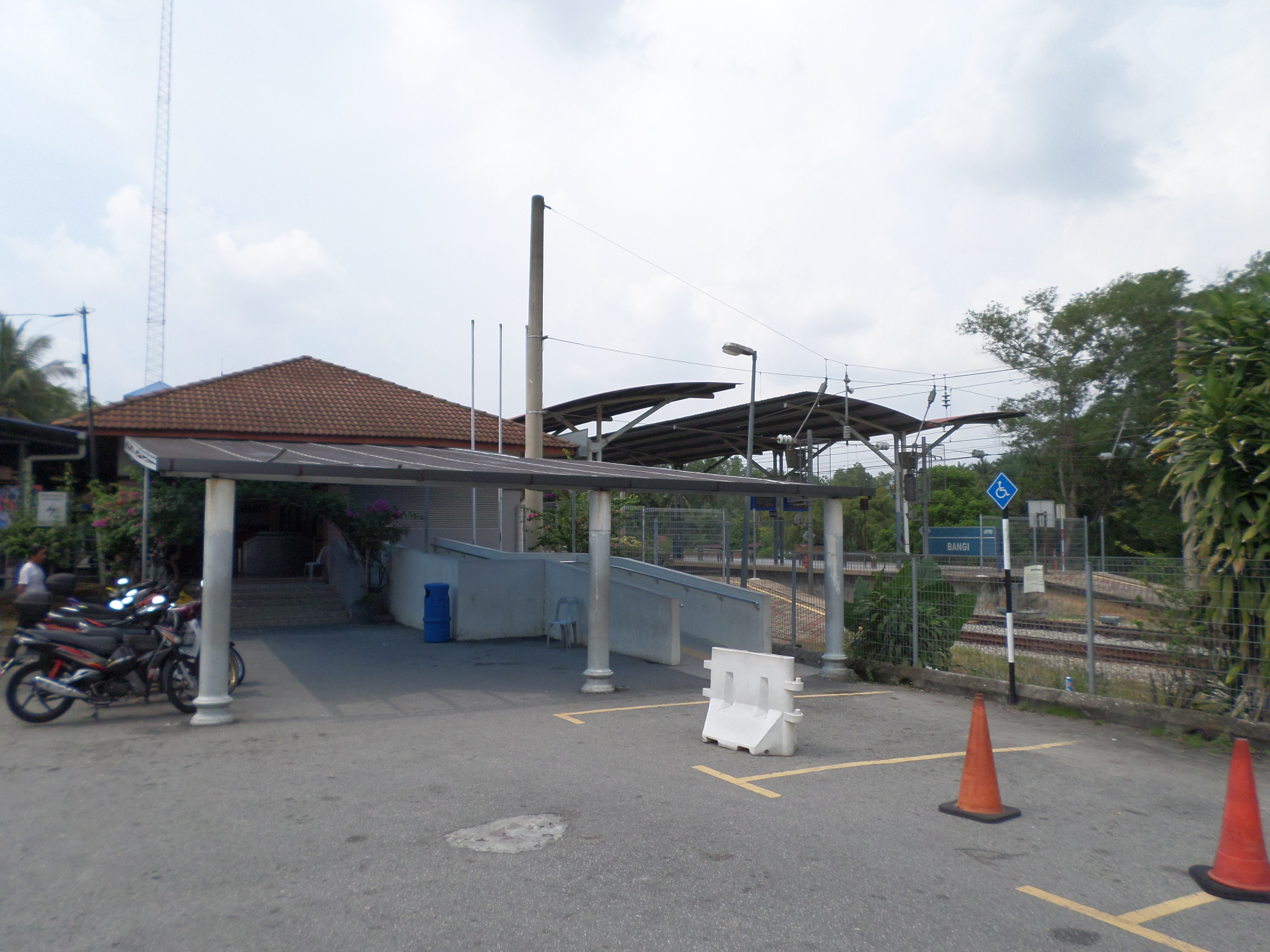

General information
- Other names: Malay: باڠي (Jawi); Chinese: 万宜; Tamil: பாங்கி
- Location: Bangi Lama, Hulu Langat, Selangor, Malaysia.
- Coordinates: 2°54′14″N 101°47′10″E
- System: KB08 | Commuter rail station
- Owner: Railway Assets Corporation
- Operator: Keretapi Tanah Melayu
- Line: West Coast Line
- Platforms: 1 side platform and 1 island platform
- Tracks: 3

Construction
- Structure type: At-grade
- Parking: Available
- Accessible: Yes

Other information
- Station code: KB08

History
- Opened: 14 June 1902; 124 years ago
- Rebuilt: 1995
- Electrified: 1995

Services
Preceding station	KTM Komuter	Following station
UKM towards Batu Caves	Batu Caves–Pulau Sebang Line	Batang Benar towards Pulau Sebang/Tampin
Location

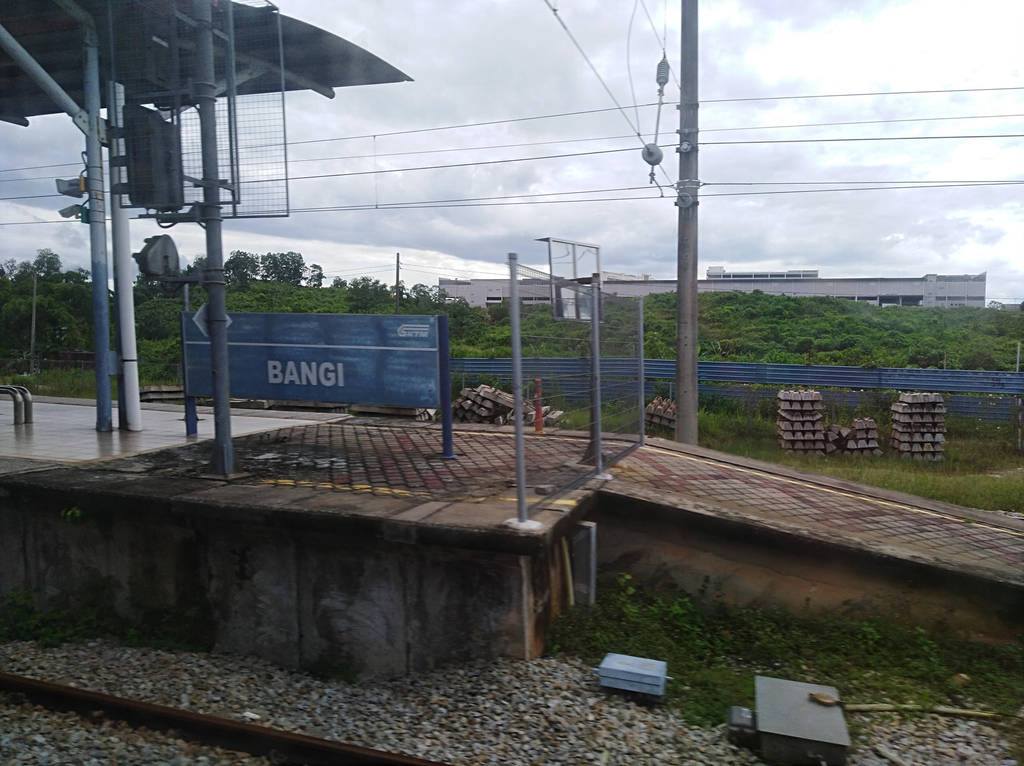
Running in board

Bangi Komuter station is a KTM Komuter train station located at and named after the small town of Bangi Lama, Hulu Langat District, Selangor, Malaysia. The station is situated on the northeast tip of the town, and is served by the Seremban Line KTM Komuter train services.

As are larger stations along the Komuter lines, the Bangi station is situated along three lanes of railway lines (two acceptance routes at both ends and one basic routes in the middle). As such the station is also in charge of managing railway switches and supports a small railway staff.

The Bangi Komuter station has a slightly unusual track and platform configuration. The station contains a side platform (platform 1) adjoining the station building and an island platform (platforms 2 and 3) connected by a pedestrian bridge; two railway lines run between the platforms, while one line runs on the other side of the island platform. This basically allows Komuter services to use all three tracks along the line, but in practice, KTM Komuter trains are only assigned to travel along the station's two outlying tracks (platforms 1 and 3), while the remaining track in between (connected to platform 2) is assigned as a basic route for southbound trains that are simply passing through. The track along platform 1 is a basic route.

Due to its relatively close proximity to the town of Bangi, as well as nearby townships such as Bandar Seri Putra, Bukit Mahkota, Bangi Avenue and Bandar Puteri, the station receives a fair number of patrons using the Komuter service.
