= Mentari BRT station =

Railway station in Malaysia

Coordinates: 3.076280°N 101.610215°E

SB2 Mentari
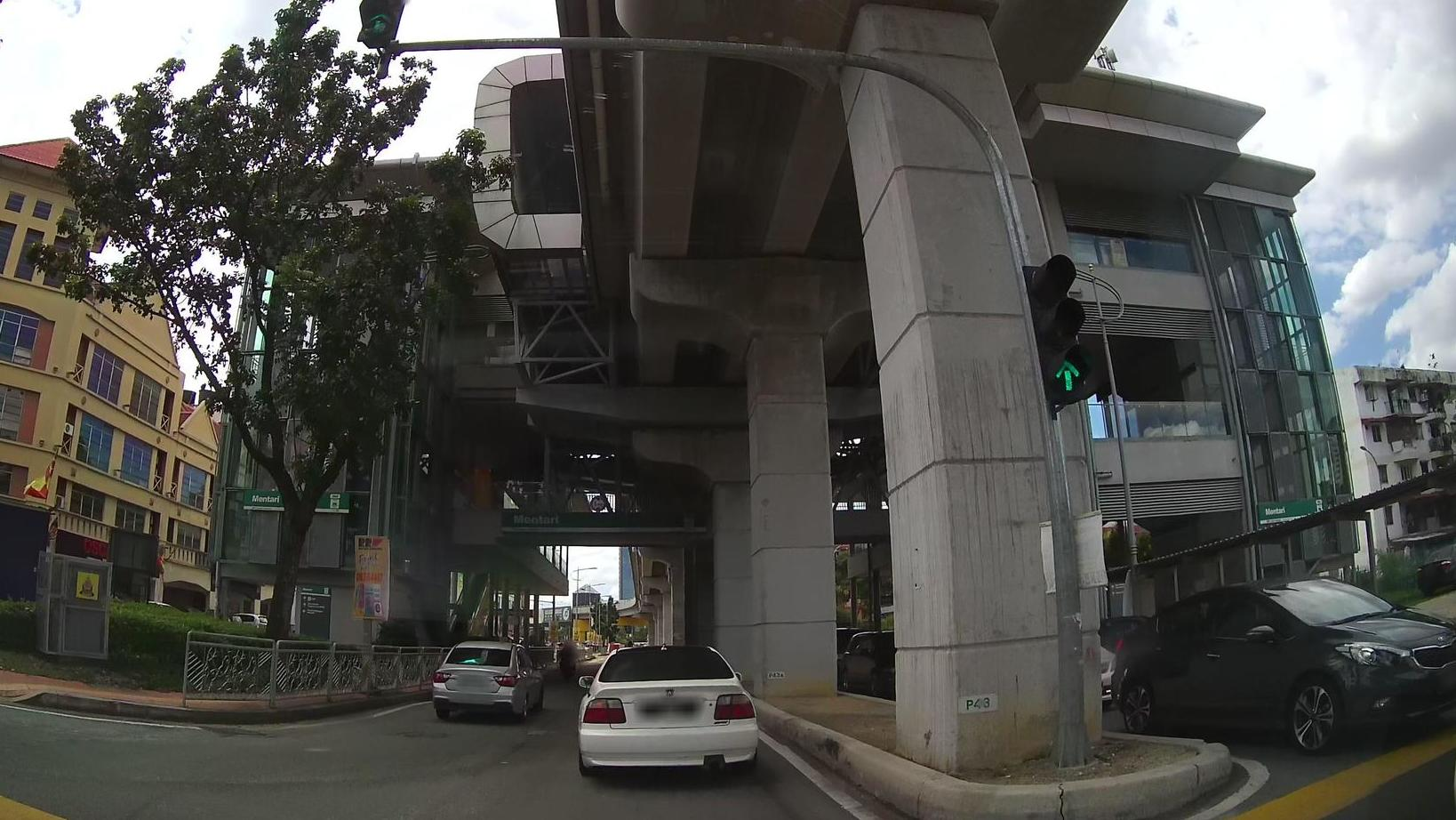

General information
- Other names: Malay: منتاري (Jawi); Chinese: 孟达里; Tamil: மென்டாரி
- Location: Jalan PJS 8/9, Bandar Sunway, 46150 Petaling Jaya; Selangor; Malaysia
- System: | BRT station
- Owner: Prasarana Malaysia
- Platforms: 2 side platforms
- Bus routes: B1 BRT Sunway
- Bus operators: Rapid Bus

Construction
- Structure type: Elevated
- Parking: Not available

Other information
- Station code: SB2

History
- Opened: 2 June 2015

Services
Preceding station		Following station
Sunway Lagoon towards USJ 7	BRT Sunway Line	Sunway-Setia Jaya Terminus
Location

The Mentari BRT station is located in Bandar Sunway, Petaling Jaya, Selangor, and is served by the BRT Sunway Line. Like other BRT stations on the line, this BRT station is elevated.

The station is surrounded by shoplots and apartments, and serves the Sunway Mentari commercial area.
