= Masjid Jamek LRT station =

LRT station in Kuala Lumpur, Malaysia

Coordinates: 3°8′58.8″N 101°41′47.1″E

AG7 SP7 KJ13 Masjid Jamek
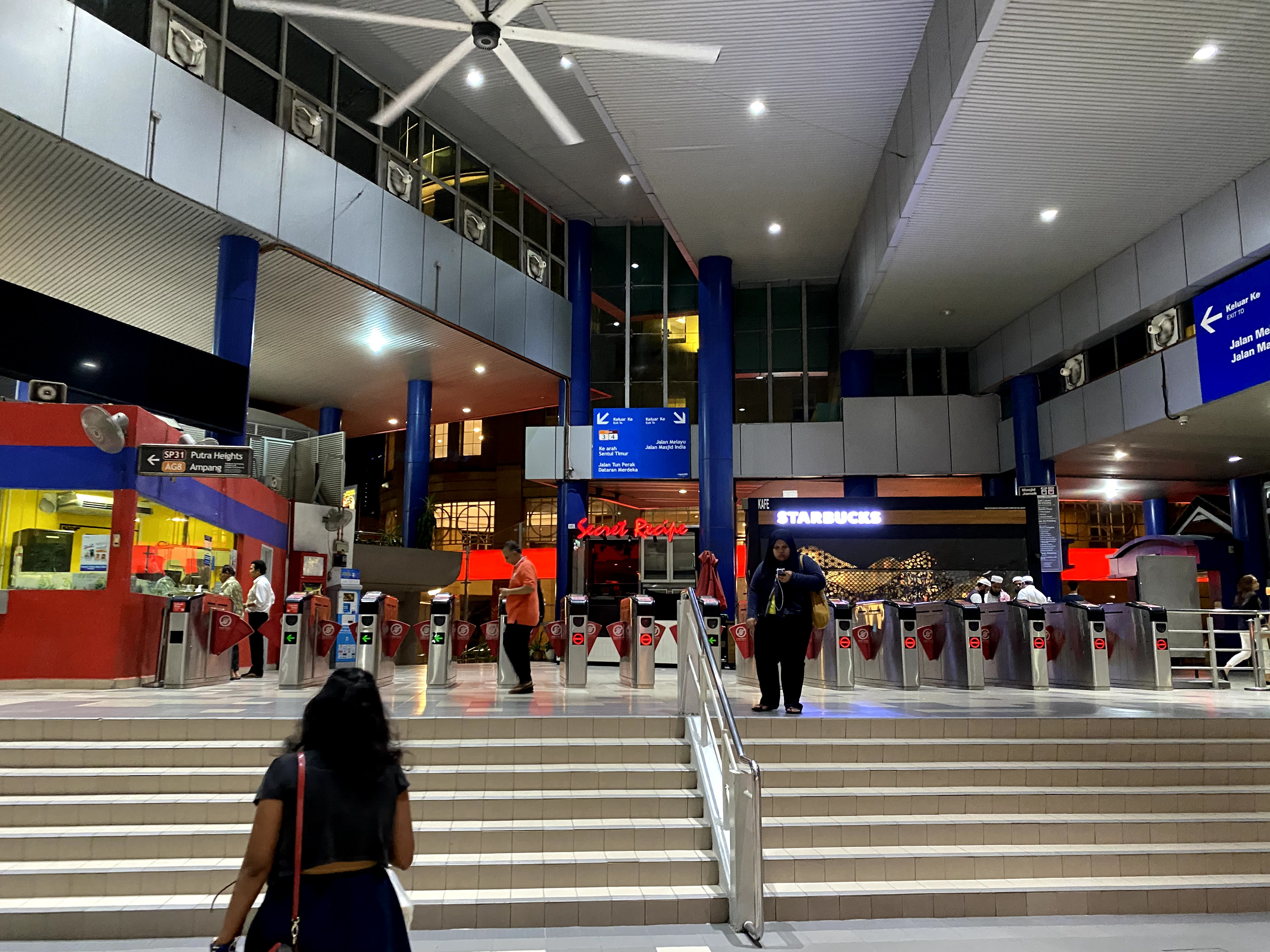
- Station plaza and concourse

General information
- Other names: Malay: مسجد جامع (Jawi); Chinese: 占美清真寺; Tamil: மஸ்ஜித் ஜமெயிக்
- Location: Jalan Tun Perak, City Centre; 50050 Kuala Lumpur; Malaysia
- System: Rapid KL
- Owner: Prasarana Malaysia
- Operator: Rapid Rail
- Lines: 3 Ampang Line; 4 Sri Petaling Line; 5 Kelana Jaya Line
- Platforms: 2 side platforms (Ampang & Sri Petaling Lines); 1 island platform (Kelana Jaya Line)
- Tracks: 2 (Ampang & Sri Petaling Lines); 2 (Kelana Jaya Line)

Construction
- Structure type: AG7 SP7 Elevated; KJ13 Underground
- Platform levels: 4
- Parking: Not available
- Cycle facilities: Not available
- Accessible: Available

Other information
- Station code: AG7 SP7 KJ13

History
- Opened: 16 December 1996; 29 years ago (Ampang & Sri Petaling Lines); 1 June 1999; 27 years ago (Kelana Jaya Line)

Services
Preceding station		Following station
Bandaraya towards Sentul Timur	Ampang Line	Plaza Rakyat towards Ampang
Bandaraya towards Sentul Timur	Sri Petaling Line	Plaza Rakyat towards Putra Heights
Dang Wangi towards Gombak	Kelana Jaya Line	Pasar Seni towards Putra Heights
Location

Masjid Jamek LRT station is a light rapid transit (LRT) station in Kuala Lumpur, Malaysia. It is an interchange station between two of Rapid KL's light rapid transit (LRT) systems, namely the LRT Ampang and Sri Petaling Lines and the LRT Kelana Jaya Line. The station is one of only two stations integrating the LRT systems, the other being Putra Heights station. The station is situated near and named after the Jamek Mosque in central Kuala Lumpur.

Despite being called an interchange station, up until 28 November 2011, there were effectively two Masjid Jamek stations in operational terms. An elevated Masjid Jamek station which was served by the Ampang and Sri Petaling Lines with two side platforms above Jalan Tun Perak, while an underground Masjid Jamek station with a single island platform served by the Kelana Jaya Line, each having their respective ticketing systems, which were not integrated. Commuters had to exit one system, and purchase a new ticket before entering the other system if they wanted to transfer from one line to the other.

Prior to 2006, when a plaza was built above the Klang River linking the stations, the Ampang and Sri Petaling Line's station and the Kelana Jaya Line's station were two physically separate buildings. There were limited pedestrian walkways between the two stations resulting in commuters having to be exposed to the sun and rain and even having to cross the busy Jalan Tun Perak (formerly Mountbatten Road) to change from one line to the other. The Ampang and Sri Petaling Line station even had different tickting offices and fare gates for each platform of the elevated station on either side of Jalan Tun Perak, hence passengers wanting to switch platforms had to tap out on one side, cross Jalan Tun Perak, and purchase a new ticket on the other side.

On 28 November 2011, the fare gates that separated the two systems were removed, and the plaza that physically linked the two stations became part of the "paid (or restricted) zone" of a physically integrated Masjid Jamek station. This allowed commuters to transfer from one line to another without leaving the system for the first time since the two stations became operational.

== History ==
=== Ampang Line and Sri Petaling Line station ===
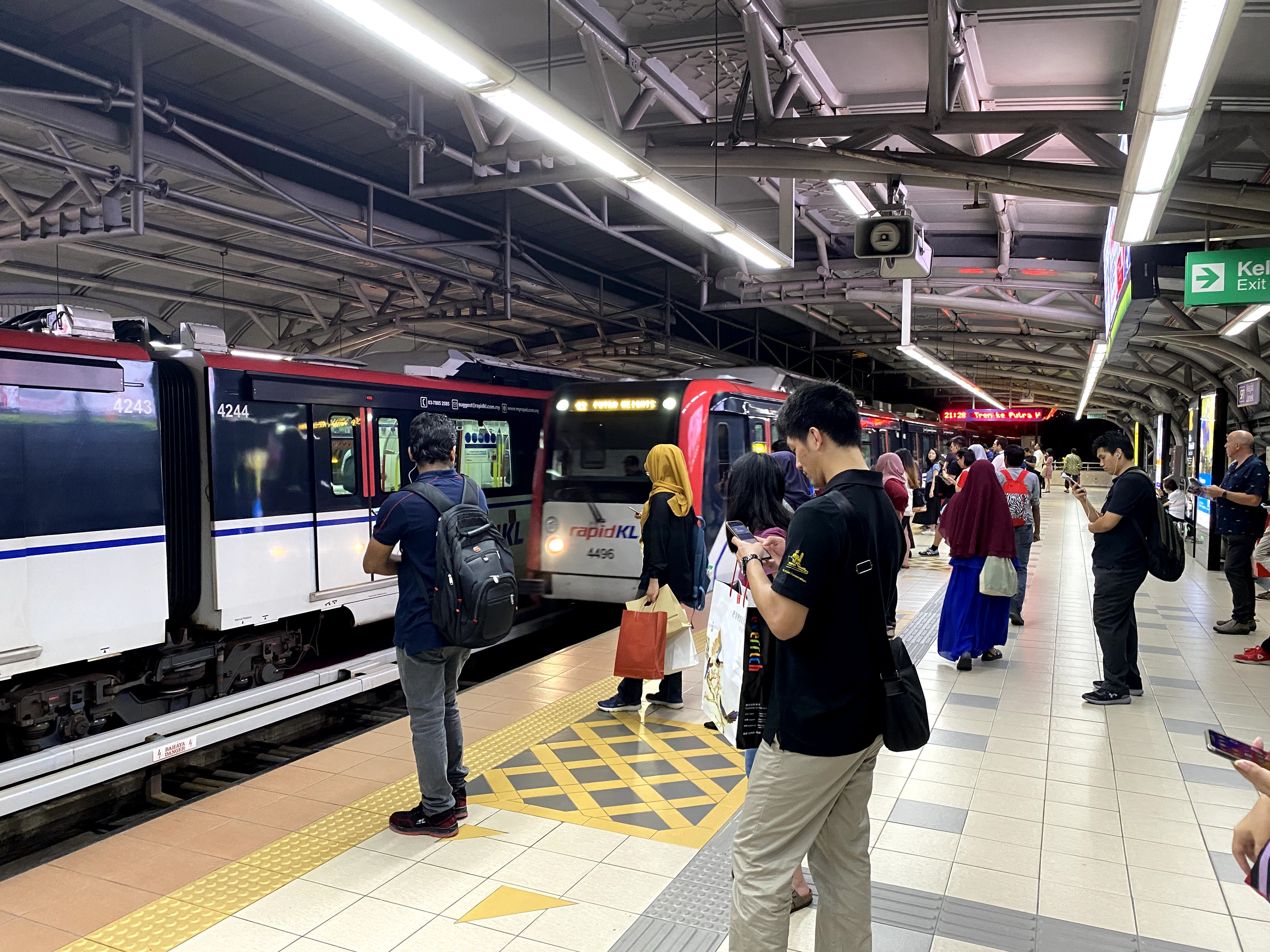
The platform of the Ampang and Sri Petaling lines of Masjid Jamek station; this is a station with high ridership for both lines (and the Kelana Jaya line as well)

Opened on 16 December 1996 as part of Phase 1 of the then STAR LRT system, the Ampang and Sri Petaling Line station was constructed directly above a bridge along Jalan Tun Perak that crosses the Klang River shortly before the Klang River-Gombak River confluence: Its elevated tracks and side platforms are suspended above Jalan Tun Perak, while the ticketing concourses are located over the Klang River, at street level.

The station, similar to surface-level stations from the Chan Sow Lin-Ampang route, has one ticketing concourse for each of the two platforms. The two concourses and their exits are located on both sides of Jalan Tun Perak, and were previously not integrated. The northern concourse and platform (Platform 2) is designated for trains bound for either Ampang and Putra Heights (previously, Sri Petaling) stations, while the southern concourse and platform (Platform 1) are designated for trains bound for the Sentul Timur at the northern end of the line.

=== Kelana Jaya Line station ===
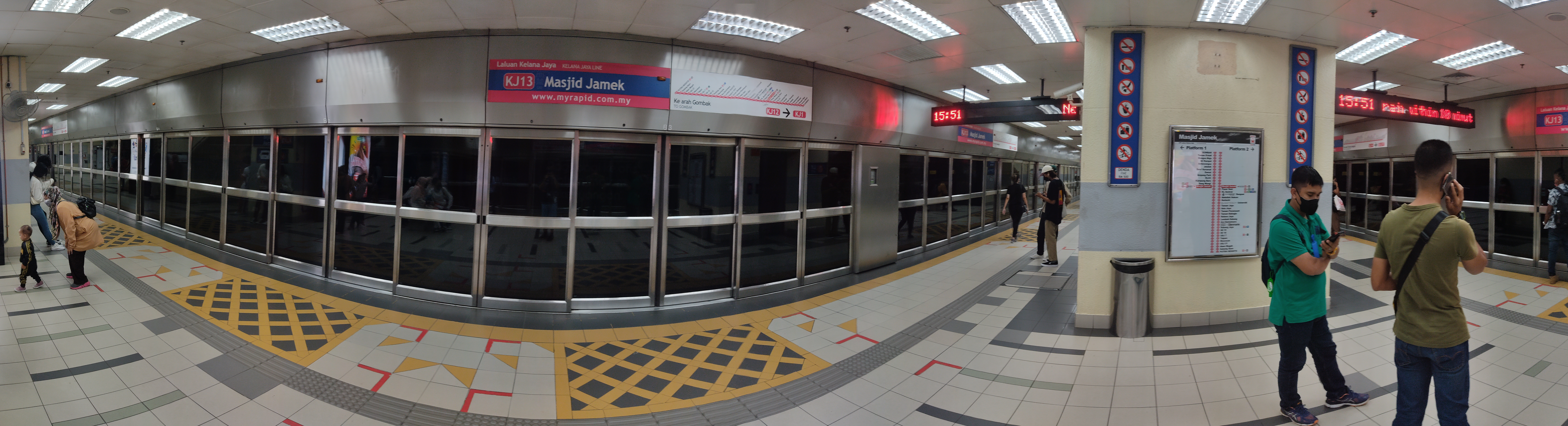
The Kelana Jaya line platform of Masjid Jamek station, one of only five underground stations for this line

The second Masjid Jamek LRT station was opened on 1 June 1999 as part of the Phase 2 of the Kelana Jaya Line (then known as PUTRA LRT).

The Kelana Jaya Line station, like other stations along the subway stretch of the line, is an underground rapid transit station that consists of a single island platform (separated from the tracks by platform screen doors) connected to a single ticketing concourse via stairways, escalators and an elevator.

The main entrance of the Kelana Jaya Line station was situated directly north of the Ampang and Sri Petaling Lines station, exiting into Jalan Melaka and Jalan Melayu via a footbridge over the Klang River. This access has now been converted into the common transit plaza. It is directly connected with the former concourse for Platform 2 (Ampang- and Putra Heights-bound platform) of the elevated station. A secondary access point was located south of the Ampang and Sri Petaling Lines station on the other side of Jalan Tun Perak behind the concourse of the Sentul Timur-bound platform (Platform 1), connected to the underground station's ticketing concourse via a long tunnel that passes underneath Jalan Tun Perak. The tunnel has since been converted into a paid or restricted area connection for transfers between the Kelana Jaya Line and Platform 1 of the Ampang and Sri Petaling Lines. As such, the former exit at the end of the tunnel to Jalan Benteng has been closed. (see below)

=== Integrated Masjid Jamek station ===
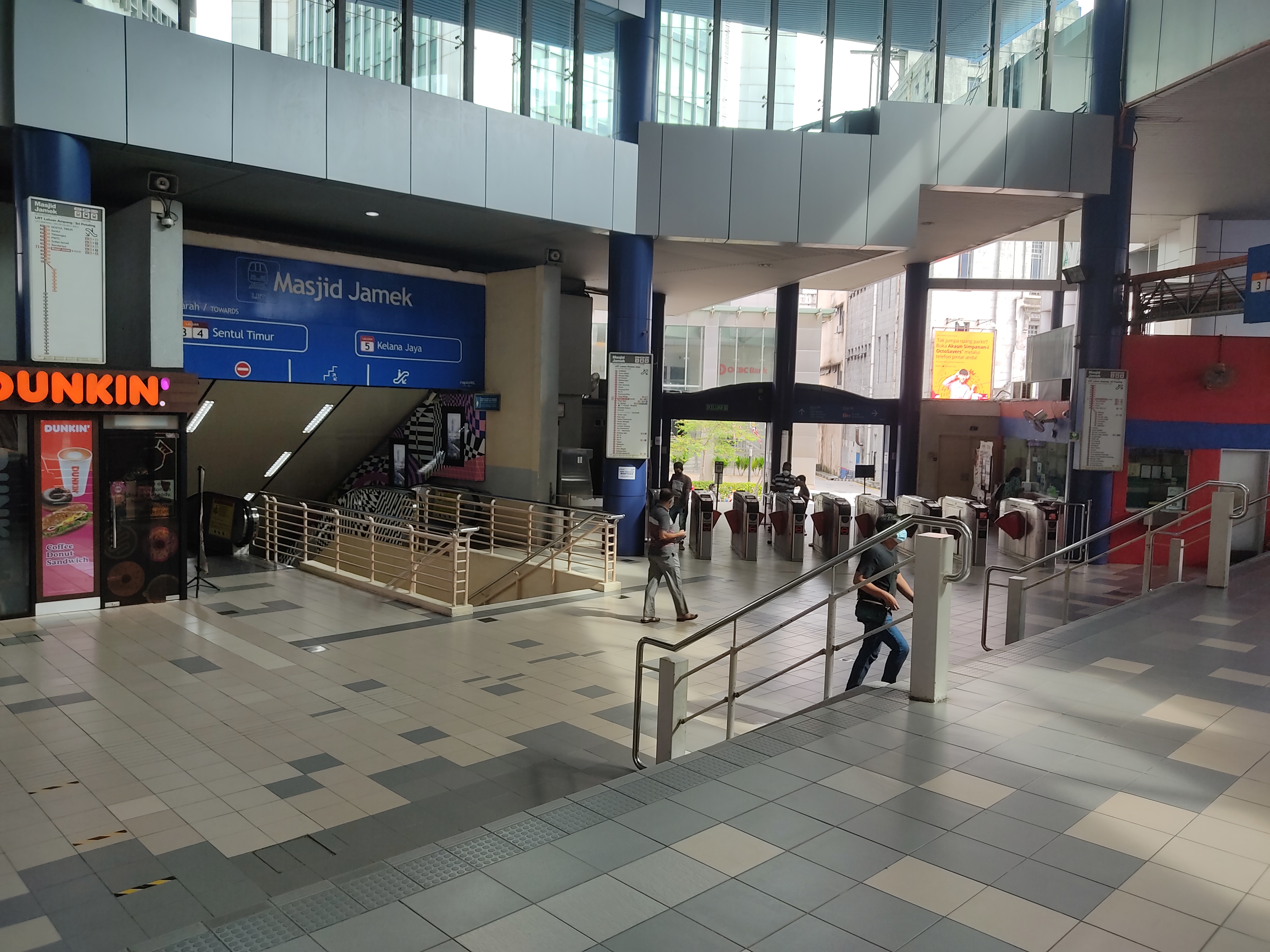
The ground-level transfer plaza concourse between Ampang and Sri Petaling lines and Kelana Jaya line

Despite the proximity of the Ampang and Sri Petaling Lines and Kelana Jaya Line stations, they were essentially two separate stations operating independently from each other, which did not provide any transfer convenience to passengers switching from one line to the other. Even passengers on the Ampang and Sri Petaling Lines who wanted to change their direction of travel at this station could not do so without exiting the turnstiles at the concourse of one side of Jalan Tun Perak, crossing Jalan Tun Perak, and then buying a new ticket at the concourse on the other side of the road to resume their journey.

When Prasarana Malaysia took over the ownership of both the STAR LRT and PUTRA LRT systems, the opportunity came to integrate the two systems physically with a common ticketing system. In November 2006, construction of a plaza over the Klang River which would eventually create a physical linkage between the Kelana Jaya Line station with the concourse of Platform 2 of the Ampang and Sri Petaling Lines station, began. Called Phase 1 of the Integrated Masjid Jamek station project, the works were completed in October 2008 and the plaza was opened to the public on 15 November 2008. However, as the two lines still had two separate ticketing systems, the actual physical linkage could not be opened and both stations still had separate entrances.

Phase 2 of efforts to integrate the two Masjid Jamek stations, which began in April 2010, then saw the physical linking up of the plaza with the concourse for Platform 2 of the Ampang and Sri Petaling Lines station; the reconfiguration of the entrances, turnstiles and ticketing office of this concourse; and the raising of the floor level of this concourse to be the same level as the plaza. The station was also upgraded to include lifts and ramps to make it accessible to the disabled.

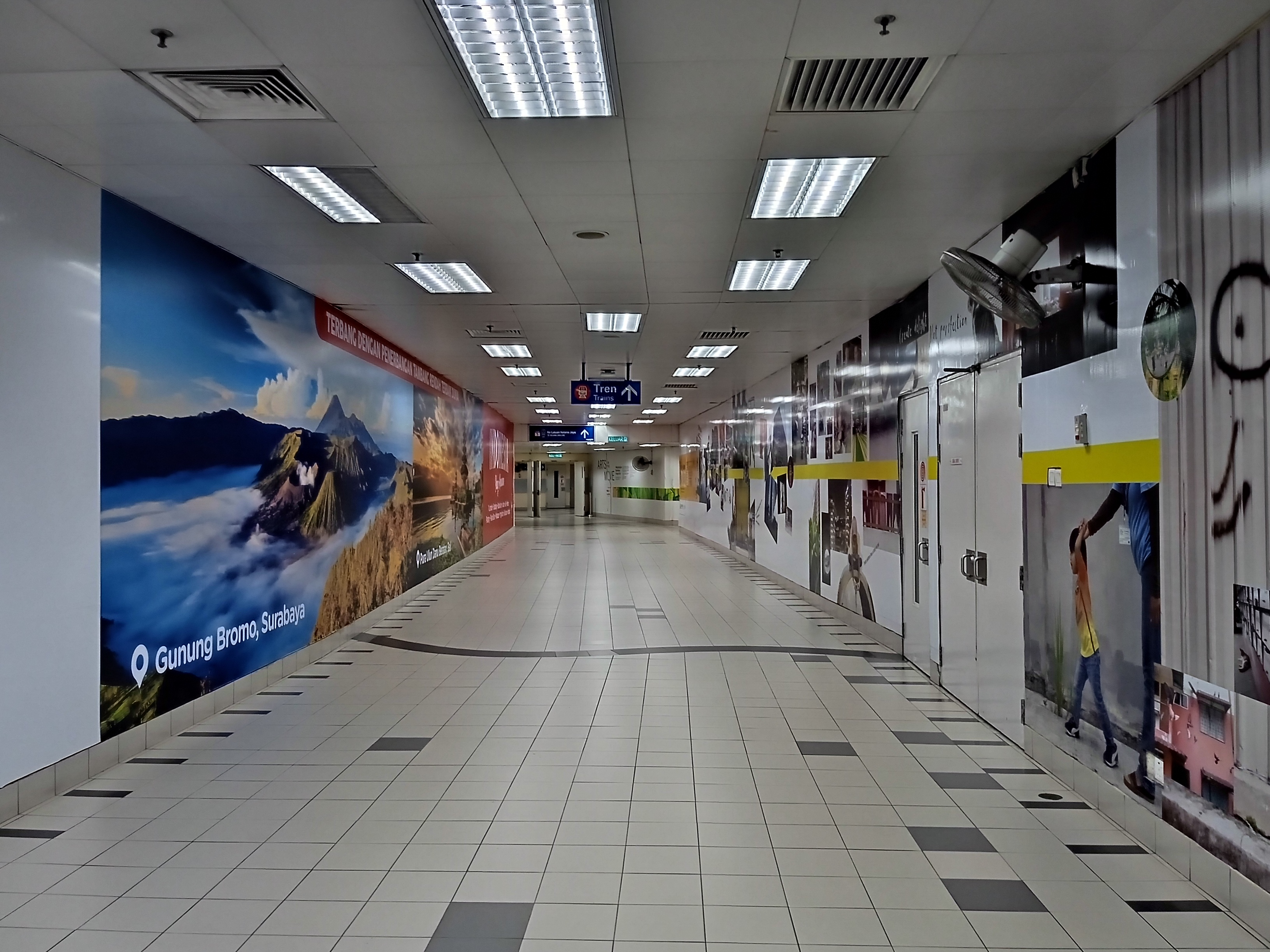
Underground passageway from the Ampang and Sri Petaling Lines station to Kelana Jaya Line station

The final steps in the integration process involved the relocation of the turnstiles for the Kelana Jaya Line from Level B1 to the Ground Level Transit Plaza. This essentially converted the entire Level B1 of the Kelana Jaya Line station into a paid area (previously, it was partially paid and unpaid). At the same time, part of the Ground Level Plaza became a paid area with the new entrance into the Kelana Jaya Line (as well as the entrance for Platform 2 of the Ampang and Sri Petaling Lines) being relocated to this level. The underpass, which previously allowed passengers to access Jalan Benteng without needing to cross Jalan Tun Perak from the Kelana Jaya concourse Level B1 was converted into a paid area for passengers transferring between the Kelana Jaya Line and Platform 1 of the Ampang and Sri Petaling Lines. As the underpass was now a restricted area, access to and from Jalan Benteng was sealed-off. The Kelana Jaya Line ticketing office on Level B1 was then closed and integrated with what was previously the Ampang/Sri Petaling Line ticketing office at the Ground Level Plaza.

On 28 November 2011, the integration process was completed. For the first time, passengers from the Kelana Jaya Line could transfer onto the Ampang and Sri Petaling Lines and vice versa without needing to buy new tickets.

== Bus services ==
Masjid Jamek station is adjacent to two bus hubs: the Medan Pasar bus hub bus hub, in front of the headquarters of HSBC Bank Malaysia, and the Kota Raya bus hub. Trunk bus routes radiate (and converge) here from adjacent suburbs and towns e.g. Sungai Buloh, Ampang, Segambut/Mont Kiara, Kuala Selangor, Kajang, Putrajaya, Subang Jaya and Jalan Klang Lama.

=== Lebuh Pudu Bus Hub ===
The Lebuh Pudu bus hub located near the Maybank tower and Mydin Sinar Kota branches.

Route No.	Operator	Origin	Destination	Via
100	Selangor Omnibus	Lebuh Pudu Bus Hub (West Sinar Kota)	Terminal Malawati, Kuala Selangor	FT 5 Jalan Kuala Selangor; Ijok; FT 54 Kepong-Kuala Selangor Highway; PY04 KA08 Sungai Buloh (Overhead bridge access to Entrance B); KA07 Kepong Sentral / PY08 Sri Damansara Timur; PY09 Metro Prima; PY10 Kepong Baru; PY11 Jinjang; PY12 Sri Delima; Jalan Sultan Azlan Shah (Jalan Ipoh); PY14 Kentonmen; PY15 Jalan Ipoh; PY16 Sentul Barat; MR10 Chow Kit; Jalan Tuanku Abdul Rahman; SP5 AG5 Sultan Ismail; Jalan Dang Wangi
103	Selangor Omnibus	Lebuh Pudu Bus Hub (West Sinar Kota)	Damansara Damai	Jalan PJU 10/1; FT 54 Kepong-Kuala Selangor Highway; PY04 KA08 Sungai Buloh (Overhead bridge access to Entrance B); KA07 Kepong Sentral / PY08 Sri Damansara Timur; PY09 Metro Prima; PY10 Kepong Baru; PY11 Jinjang; PY12 Sri Delima; Jalan Sultan Azlan Shah (Jalan Ipoh); PY14 Kentonmen; PY15 Jalan Ipoh; PY16 Sentul Barat; MR10 Chow Kit; Jalan Tuanku Abdul Rahman; SP5 AG5 Sultan Ismail; Jalan Dang Wangi
104	Selangor Omnibus	Lebuh Pudu Bus Hub (West Sinar Kota)	Wangsa Permai	Desa Aman Puri; Persiaran Cemara; Persiaran Jati; FT 54 Kepong-Kuala Selangor Highway; PY04 KA08 Sungai Buloh (Overhead bridge access to Entrance B); KA07 Kepong Sentral / PY08 Sri Damansara Timur; PY09 Metro Prima; PY10 Kepong Baru; PY11 Jinjang; PY12 Sri Delima; Jalan Sultan Azlan Shah (Jalan Ipoh); PY14 Kentonmen; PY15 Jalan Ipoh; PY16 Sentul Barat; MR10 Chow Kit; Jalan Tuanku Abdul Rahman; SP5 AG5 Sultan Ismail; Jalan Dang Wangi
107	Selangor Omnibus	Lebuh Pudu Bus Hub (West Sinar Kota)	Bestari Jaya	Jalan Bukit Badong; Ijok; FT 54 Kepong-Kuala Selangor Highway; PY04 KA08 Sungai Buloh (Overhead bridge access to Entrance B); KA07 Kepong Sentral / PY08 Sri Damansara Timur; PY09 Metro Prima; PY10 Kepong Baru; PY11 Jinjang; PY12 Sri Delima; Jalan Sultan Azlan Shah (Jalan Ipoh); PY14 Kentonmen; PY15 Jalan Ipoh; PY16 Sentul Barat; MR10 Chow Kit; Jalan Tuanku Abdul Rahman; SP5 AG5 Sultan Ismail; Jalan Dang Wangi
120	Selangor Omnibus	Lebuh Pudu Bus Hub (West Sinar Kota)	North Jinjang	FT 54 Kepong-Kuala Selangor Highway; PY12 Sri Delima; Jalan Sultan Azlan Shah (Jalan Ipoh); PY14 Kentonmen; PY15 Jalan Ipoh; PY16 Sentul Barat; MR10 Chow Kit; Jalan Tuanku Abdul Rahman; SP5 AG5 Sultan Ismail; Jalan Dang Wangi
150	MARA Liner	Lebuh Pudu Bus Hub (North Sinar Kota)	Rawang Bus Terminal	FT 1 Kuala Lumpur-Rawang Highway; KC04 Taman Wahyu; Jalan Sultan Azlan Shah (Jalan Ipoh); PY14 Kentonmen; PY15 Jalan Ipoh; PY16 Sentul Barat; MR10 Chow Kit; Jalan Tuanku Abdul Rahman; SP5 AG5 Sultan Ismail; Jalan Dang Wangi
151	Rapid KL	Lebuh Pudu Bus Hub (North Sinar Kota)	Bandar Baru Selayang	Jalan Besar Selayang Baru; FT 1 Kuala Lumpur-Rawang Highway; KC04 Taman Wahyu; Jalan Sultan Azlan Shah (Jalan Ipoh); PY14 Kentonmen; PY15 Jalan Ipoh; PY16 Sentul Barat; MR10 Chow Kit; Jalan Tuanku Abdul Rahman; SP5 AG5 Sultan Ismail; Jalan Dang Wangi
152	MARA Liner	Lebuh Pudu Bus Hub (North Sinar Kota)	Taman Intan Baiduri, Selayang	Jalan Bidara; Jalan Selayang Jaya 14; FT 1 Kuala Lumpur-Rawang Highway; KC04 Taman Wahyu; Jalan Sultan Azlan Shah (Jalan Ipoh); PY14 Kentonmen; PY15 Jalan Ipoh; PY16 Sentul Barat; MR10 Chow Kit; Jalan Tuanku Abdul Rahman; SP5 AG5 Sultan Ismail; Jalan Dang Wangi
190	Rapid KL	Medan Pasar bus hub Lin Ho department store	Mont Kiara / Segambut Dalam	Jalan Segambut; KA05 Segambut; Jalan Ipoh; Jalan Tuanku Abdul Rahman; SP5 AG5 Sultan Ismail
400	Rapid KL	Lebuh Pudu Bus Hub (South Sinar Kota)	Damai Perdana	Taman Desa Baiduri; Alam Damai; FT 1 Jalan Cheras; KG25 Taman Mutiara / Cheras Leisure Mall; KG24 Taman Midah; KG22 AG13 Maluri; Jalan Pudu; MR5 Imbi / Berjaya Times Square (KL-bound only); KG18A Bukit Bintang / MR6 Bukit Bintang (KL-bound only); Jalan Raja Chulan (KL-bound only); Jalan Tun H.S. Lee (KL-bound only)
450	Rapid KL	Lebuh Pudu Bus Hub (South Sinar Kota)	Kajang Bus Terminal	Reko Sentral; Jalan Reko; Kajang town KG34 Stadium Kajang; KG35 Sungai Jernih; Sungai Sekamat; Simpang Balak; KG31 Bukit Dukung; FT 1 Cheras–Kajang Expressway; Jalan Hulu Langat; Batu 9 Cheras / Taman Suntex; KG26 Taman Connaught; KG25 Taman Mutiara / Cheras Leisure Mall; KG24 Taman Midah; KG22 AG13 Maluri; Jalan Pudu; Jalan Pasar
523	KR City Bus (KR Travel & Tours)	Medan Pasar bus hub	KT3 PY41 Putrajaya Sentral	Jalan Enggang P9; Jalan Tempua P9B; Lebuh Perdana Barat; Alamanda Putrajaya; IOI City Mall; Serdang Hospital; Sungai Besi Expressway; KB05 Serdang; East–West Link Expressway (Kuala Lumpur–Seremban Expressway) - Putrajaya-bound only KJ14 KG16 Pasar Seni

== Additional images ==
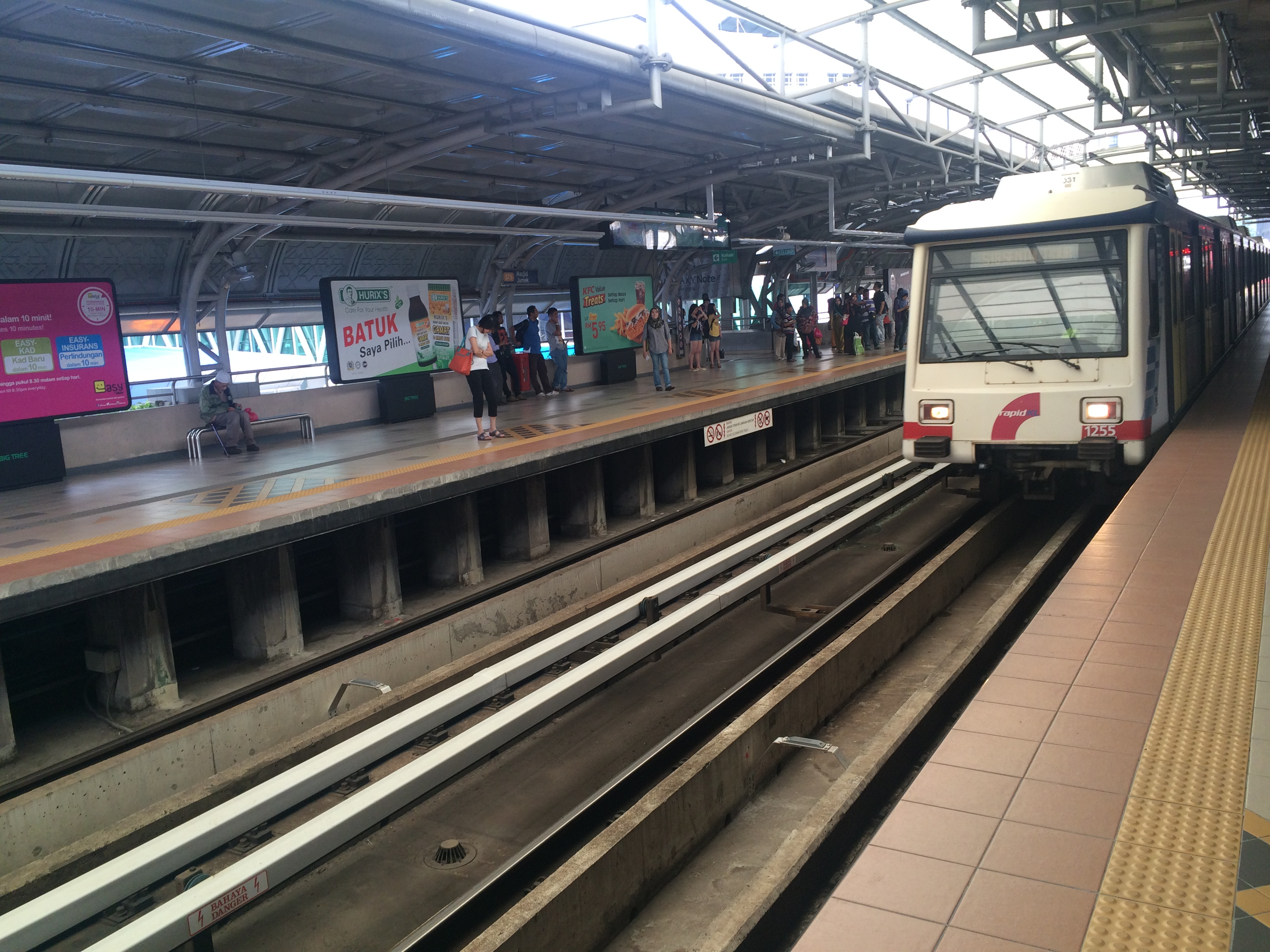
Old rolling stock of an Ampang/Sri Petaling Line train at Masjid Jamek

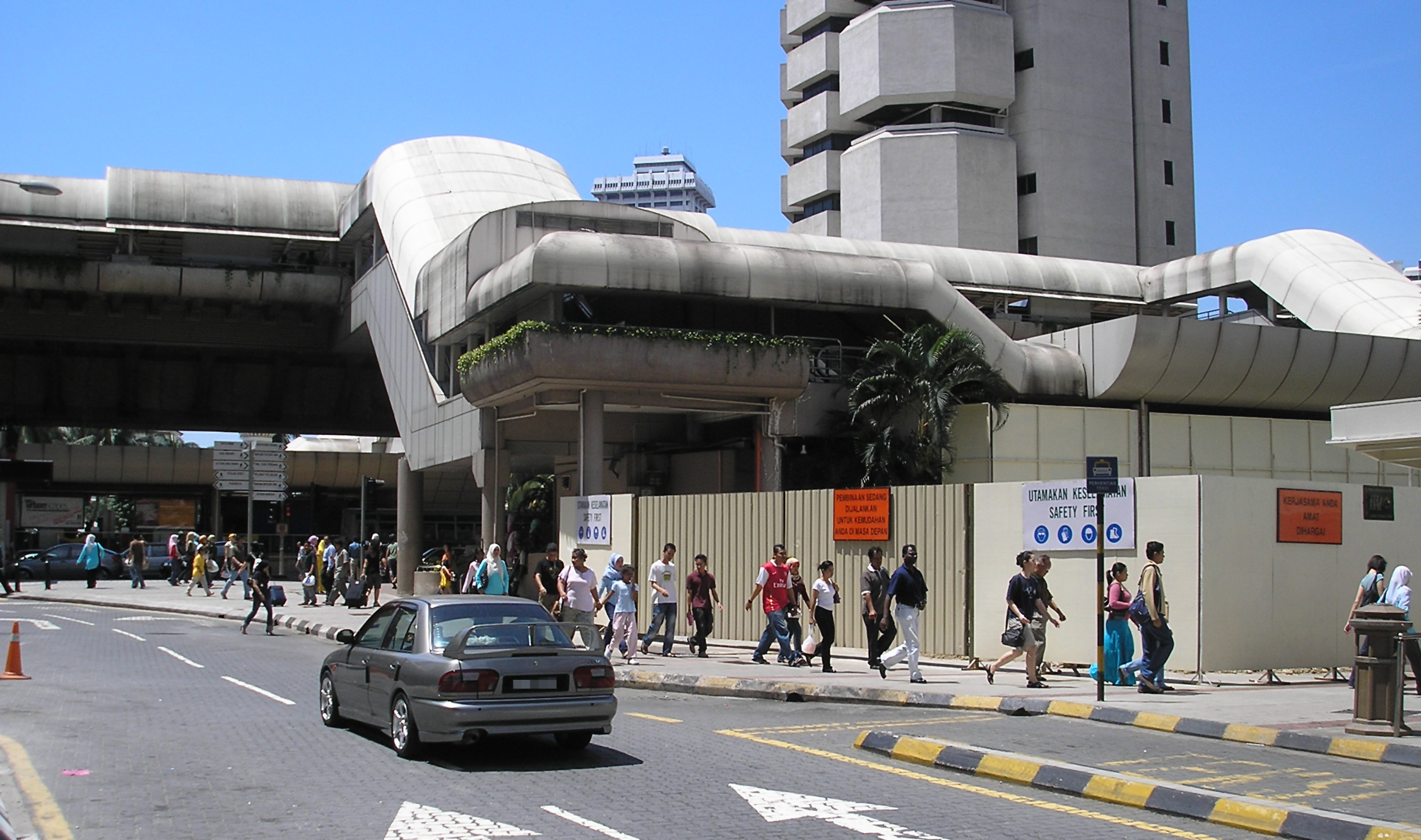
Partial exterior view of the Ampang and Sri Petaling Lines' station as seen towards the southwest

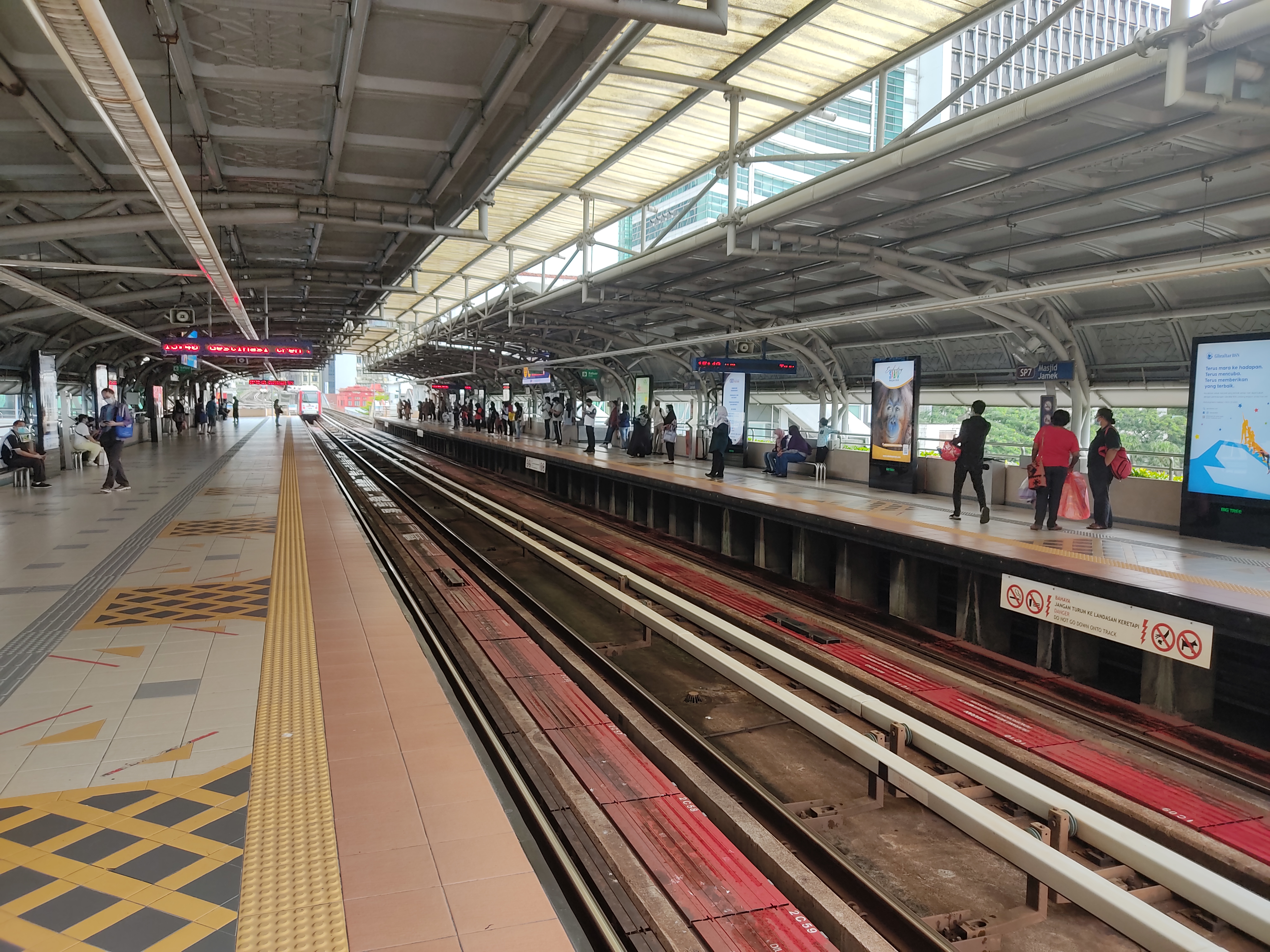
The platform level of the Ampang Line and Sri Petaling Lines' station

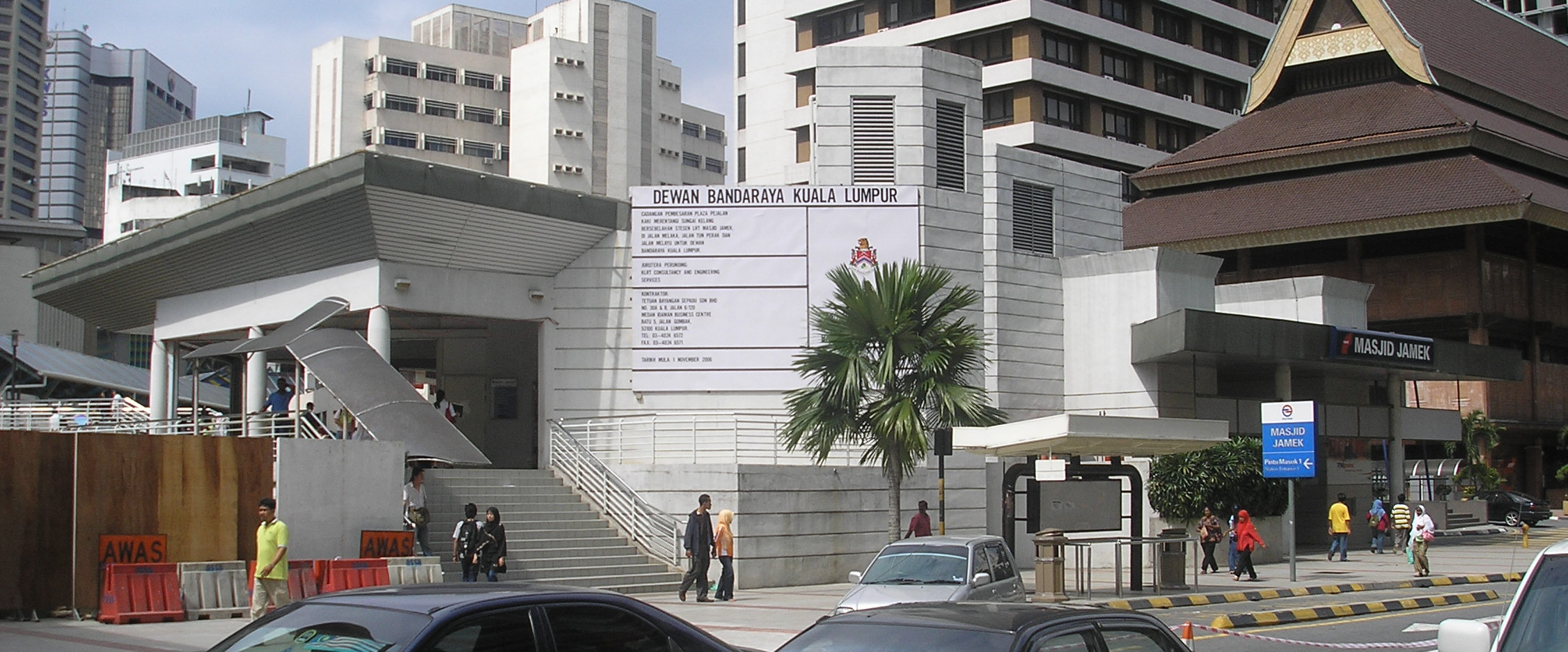
The northern entrance of the Kelana Jaya Line's station as seen towards the north

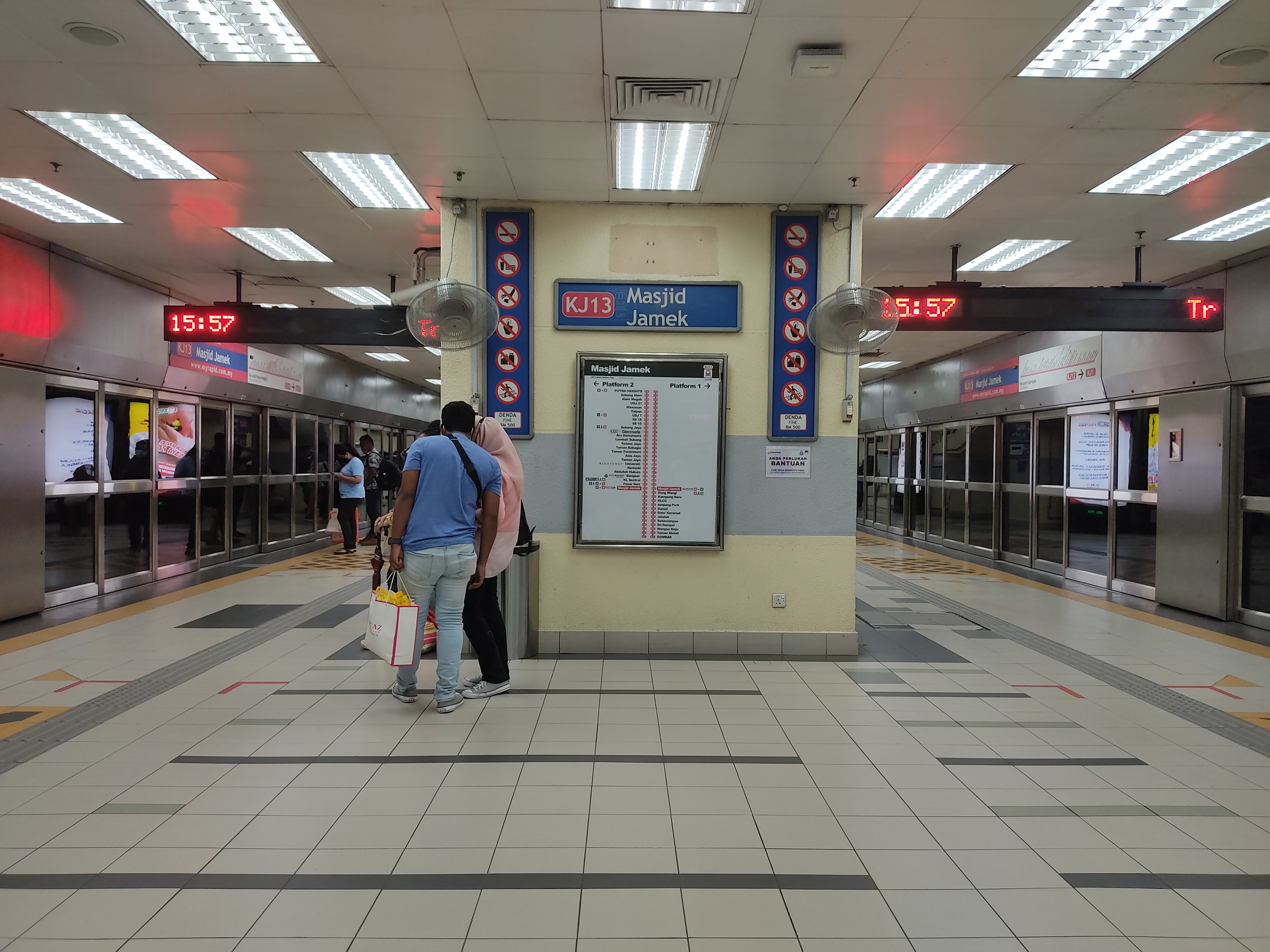
The underground platform level of the Kelana Jaya Line's station

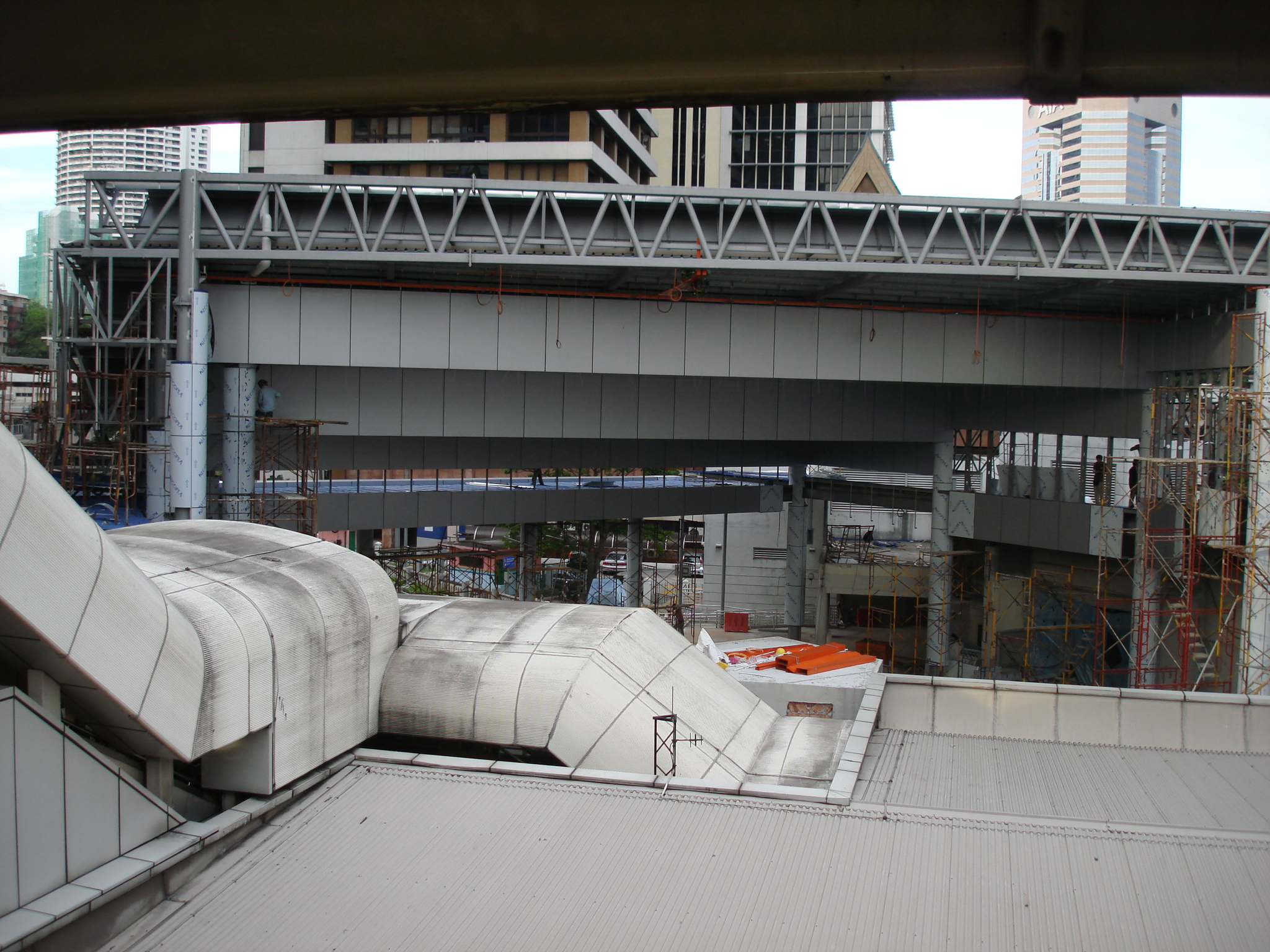
Plaza connecting the two stations under construction

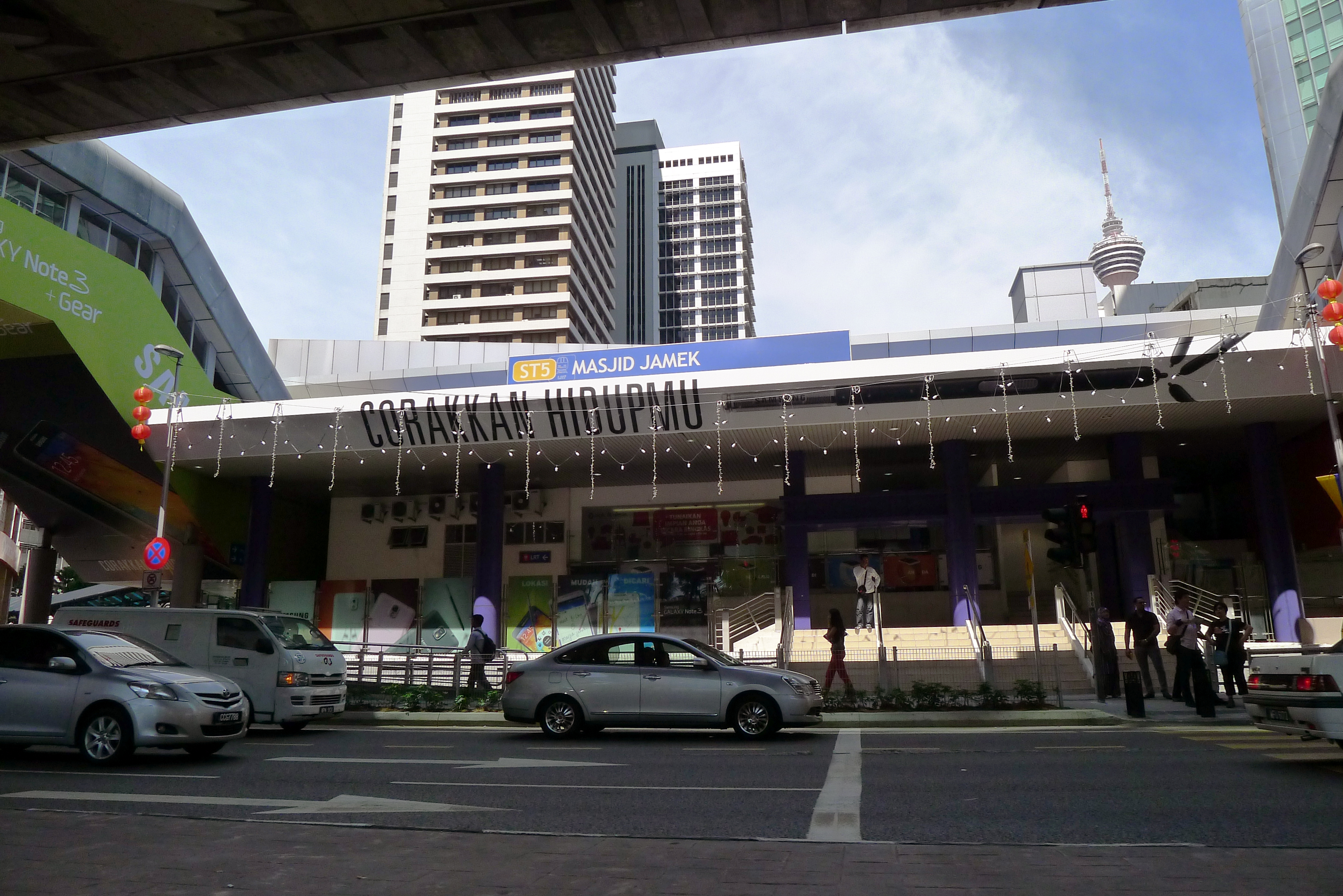
A street level view of the station along Jalan Tun Perak in 2014

The escalator and staircase towards the train platforms for the Ampang/Sri Petaling line.

A train bound to Ampang approaching the station.

== Around the station ==
- HSBC Bank (1912 - 2022, since relocated to Tun Razak Exchange)
- DBKL City Theatre
- Jalan Masjid India Flea Market/Mydin
- Exchange Square
- Kuala Lumpur Library
- Merdeka Square
- National History Museum
- Saint John's Cathedral
- Saint Mary's Cathedral
- Sultan Abdul Samad Building
- Sultan Abdul Samad Jamek Mosque
- Telekom Museum
