= Sri Delima MRT station =

Railway station in Kuala Lumpur, Malaysia

PY12 Sri Delima

General information
- Other names: Malay: سري دليما (Jawi); Chinese: 斯里德里玛; Tamil: செரி டெலிமா
- Location: Jalan Kepong, Jinjang Utara; 52000 Kuala Lumpur; Malaysia
- Coordinates: 3.2072°N 101.6654°E
- System: Rapid KL
- Owner: MRT Corp
- Operator: Rapid Rail
- Line: 12 Putrajaya Line
- Platforms: 1 island platform
- Tracks: 2

Construction
- Parking: Unavailable
- Accessible: Yes

Other information
- Status: Operational
- Station code: PY12

History
- Opened: 16 June 2022; 4 years ago

Services
Preceding station		Following station
Jinjang towards Kwasa Damansara	Putrajaya Line	Kampung Batu towards Putrajaya Sentral
Location

The Sri Delima MRT station is a mass rapid transit (MRT) station in Batu, northern Kuala Lumpur, Malaysia, serving the neighbourhoods of Taman Sri Delima and Jinjang Utara. It is one of the stations on the MRT Putrajaya Line.

The station began operations on 16 June 2022 as part of Phase One operations of the Putrajaya Line.

== Location ==
The station is located along Jalan Kepong, next to the Batu river reservoir.

Tenaga Nasional's Kepong branch is located right behind the station. Brem Mall is located 330m southeast of the station, across Jalan Kepong.

== Bus Services ==
=== Feeder buses ===
Route No.	Origin	Desitination	Via	Connecting to
T118(Terminated)	PY12 Sri Delima (Entrance B)	Taman Kok Doh	Jalan Jambu; Taman Sejahtera; Taman City	Terminus
T121	PY12 Sri Delima (Entrance C)	Taman Wahyu	Jalan Sibu; Jalan Seri Utara	Terminus
CREAM	Taman Fadason Hub	PY12 Sri Delima (Entrance B)	Jalan 2/17; Jalan 15/34c Jinjang Health Clinic; Jalan Benteng Barat; Taman Aman Putra; Jalan Tebing Timor; Kepong Metropolitan Park (South)	Terminus

=== Other buses ===
Route No.	Operator	Origin	Desitination	Via	Connecting to
100	Selangor Omnibus	Terminal Malawati, Kuala Selangor	Medan Pasar, Kuala Lumpur ( AG7 SP7 KJ13 Masjid Jamek)	FT 5 Jalan Kuala Selangor; Ijok; FT 54 Kepong-Kuala Selangor Highway; PY04 KA08 Sungai Buloh (Overhead bridge access to Entrance B); KA07 Kepong Sentral; PY08 Sri Damansara Timur; PY09 Metro Prima; PY10 Kepong Baru; PY11 Jinjang; PY12 Sri Delima; Jalan Sultan Azlan Shah (Jalan Ipoh); PY14 Kentonmen; PY15 Jalan Ipoh; MR10 Chow Kit; Jalan Tuanku Abdul Rahman; SP5 AG5 Sultan Ismail; Jalan Dang Wangi	
103	Selangor Omnibus	Damansara Damai	Medan Pasar, Kuala Lumpur ( AG7 SP7 KJ13 Masjid Jamek)	Jalan PJU 10/1; FT 54 Kepong-Kuala Selangor Highway; PY04 KA08 Sungai Buloh (Overhead bridge access to Entrance B); KA07 Kepong Sentral; PY08 Sri Damansara Timur; PY09 Metro Prima; PY10 Kepong Baru; PY11 Jinjang; PY12 Sri Delima; Jalan Sultan Azlan Shah (Jalan Ipoh); PY14 Kentonmen; PY15 Jalan Ipoh; MR10 Chow Kit; Jalan Tuanku Abdul Rahman; SP5 AG5 Sultan Ismail; Jalan Dang Wangi	
104	Selangor Omnibus	Wangsa Permai	Medan Pasar, Kuala Lumpur ( AG7 SP7 KJ13 Masjid Jamek)	Desa Aman Puri; Persiaran Cemara; Persiaran Jati; FT 54 Kepong-Kuala Selangor Highway; PY04 KA08 Sungai Buloh (Overhead bridge access to Entrance B); KA07 Kepong Sentral; PY08 Sri Damansara Timur; PY09 Metro Prima; PY10 Kepong Baru; PY11 Jinjang; PY12 Sri Delima; Jalan Sultan Azlan Shah (Jalan Ipoh); PY14 Kentonmen; PY15 Jalan Ipoh; MR10 Chow Kit; Jalan Tuanku Abdul Rahman; SP5 AG5 Sultan Ismail; Jalan Dang Wangi	
107	Selangor Omnibus	Bestari Jaya	Medan Pasar, Kuala Lumpur ( AG7 SP7 KJ13 Masjid Jamek)	Jalan Bukit Badong; Ijok; FT 54 Kepong-Kuala Selangor Highway; PY04 KA08 Sungai Buloh (Overhead bridge access to Entrance B); KA07 Kepong Sentral; PY08 Sri Damansara Timur; PY09 Metro Prima; PY10 Kepong Baru; PY11 Jinjang; PY12 Sri Delima; Jalan Sultan Azlan Shah (Jalan Ipoh); PY14 Kentonmen; PY15 Jalan Ipoh; MR10 Chow Kit; Jalan Tuanku Abdul Rahman; SP5 AG5 Sultan Ismail; Jalan Dang Wangi	
120	Selangor Omnibus	North Jinjang	Medan Pasar, Kuala Lumpur ( AG7 SP7 KJ13 Masjid Jamek)	FT 54 Kepong-Kuala Selangor Highway; PY12 Sri Delima; Jalan Sultan Azlan Shah (Jalan Ipoh); PY14 Kentonmen; PY15 Jalan Ipoh; MR10 Chow Kit; Jalan Tuanku Abdul Rahman; SP5 AG5 Sultan Ismail; Jalan Dang Wangi	
