= Metro Prima MRT station =

Railway station in Kepong, Malaysia

PY09 Metro Prima
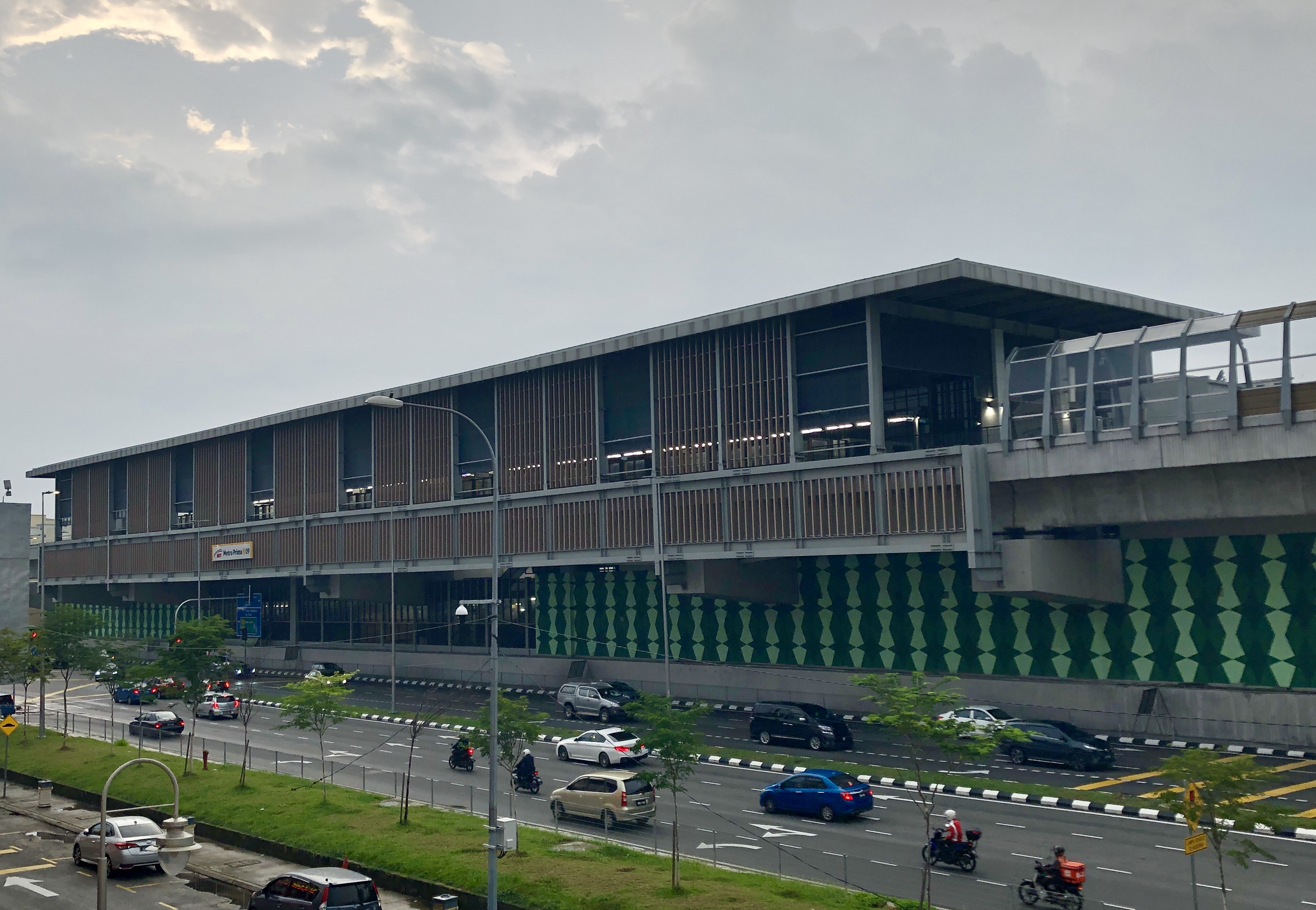

General information
- Other names: Malay: ميترو ڤريما (Jawi); Chinese: 美娜园; Tamil: மெட்ரோ பிரைமா
- Location: Jalan Kepong, Taman Usahawan, Kepong; 52100 Kuala Lumpur; Malaysia
- Coordinates: 3°12′52″N 101°38′25″E
- System: Rapid KL
- Owner: MRT Corp
- Operator: Rapid Rail
- Line: 12 Putrajaya Line
- Platforms: 1 island platform
- Tracks: 2

Construction
- Parking: Available, paid parking
- Accessible: Yes

Other information
- Status: Operational
- Station code: PY09

History
- Opened: 16 June 2022; 4 years ago

Services
Preceding station		Following station
Sri Damansara Timur towards Kwasa Damansara	Putrajaya Line	Kepong Baru towards Putrajaya Sentral
Location

The Metro Prima MRT station is a mass rapid transit (MRT) station in Kepong in northwestern Kuala Lumpur, Malaysia. It is part of the MRT Putrajaya Line.

The station began operations on 16 June 2022 as part of Phase One operations of the Putrajaya Line.

== Location ==
The station is located along Jalan Kepong, next to its intersection with Jalan Metro Prima. The station primarily serves the Metro Prima commercial centre, hence the name.

There is an AEON Mall 160m southwest of the station.

== Station features ==
- Elevated station with an island platform
- Park & Ride

=== Entrance and exit ===
Putrajaya Line station
Entrance	Location	Destination	Picture
A	Northern station	Jalan Metro Perdana Barat 1 Feeder bus (T114 & T152), taxi stand, Kepong Entrepreneurs Park, Park and Ride Metro Prima, Taman Industri Ringan Seri Edaran	
B	Southern station	Jalan Besar Kepong; Taxi/e-hailing stand, AEON Mall Metro Prima, Plaza Metro Prima, Jalan Metro Prima, Jalan Metro 2, Mutiara Magma Apartment	

== Bus services ==
=== Feeder buses ===
Route number	Origin	Desitination	Via	Connecting to	Image
T112(Terminated)	PY09 Metro Prima (Entrance B)	KA06 Kepong	Jalan Kepong; Jalan Kepong Garden; Jalan Kuang Bulan; Jalan Metro Prima	Terminus	
T113(Terminated)	PY09 Metro Prima (Entrance A) (KL451)	Kepong Entrepreneurs Park	Jalan Kepong; Jalan Metro Prima Timur; Jalan 15/34C; Kepong Metropolitan Park (South); Jalan Metro Perdana Barat	Terminus	
T114	PY09 Metro Prima (Entrance A)	Bandar Baru Selayang	Jalan Kepong; Jalan Metro Perdana Barat; Lebuhraya Selayang-Kepong; FRIM; Jalan Bidara; Persiaran 1	151, MPS1, MPS4	
T152	PY09 Metro Prima (Entrance A)	Pusat Bandar Selayang	Jalan Kepong; Jalan Metro Perdana Barat; Keong-Selayang Highway; FRIM; Selayang Mall; Jalan SJ 14; Jalan 1/2A; 99 Wonderland Park; Pasar Borong Kuala Lumpur	151, 152, MPS1, MPS4	

=== Other buses ===
Route No.	Operator	Origin	Desitination	Via	Connecting to
100	Selangor Omnibus	Terminal Malawati, Kuala Selangor	Medan Pasar, Kuala Lumpur ( AG7 SP7 KJ13 Masjid Jamek)	FT 5 Jalan Kuala Selangor; Ijok; FT 54 Kepong-Kuala Selangor Highway; PY04 KA08 Sungai Buloh (Overhead bridge access to Entrance B); KA07 Kepong Sentral; PY08 Sri Damansara Timur; Jalan Kepong; PY09 Metro Prima (Entrance A for Kuala Selangor-bound, Entrance B for Kuala Lumpur-bound); PY10 Kepong Baru; PY11 Jinjang; PY12 Sri Delima; Jalan Sultan Azlan Shah (Jalan Ipoh); PY14 Kentonmen; PY15 Jalan Ipoh; MR10 Chow Kit; Jalan Tuanku Abdul Rahman; SP5 AG5 Sultan Ismail; Jalan Dang Wangi	
103	Selangor Omnibus	Damansara Damai	Medan Pasar, Kuala Lumpur ( AG7 SP7 KJ13 Masjid Jamek)	Jalan PJU 10/1; FT 54 Kepong-Kuala Selangor Highway; PY04 KA08 Sungai Buloh (Overhead bridge access to Entrance B); KA07 Kepong Sentral; PY08 Sri Damansara Timur; Jalan Kepong; PY09 Metro Prima (Entrance A for Kuala Selangor-bound, Entrance B for Kuala Lumpur-bound); PY10 Kepong Baru; PY11 Jinjang; PY12 Sri Delima; Jalan Sultan Azlan Shah (Jalan Ipoh); PY14 Kentonmen; PY15 Jalan Ipoh; MR10 Chow Kit; Jalan Tuanku Abdul Rahman; SP5 AG5 Sultan Ismail; Jalan Dang Wangi	
104	Selangor Omnibus	Wangsa Permai	Medan Pasar, Kuala Lumpur ( AG7 SP7 KJ13 Masjid Jamek)	Desa Aman Puri; Persiaran Cemara; Persiaran Jati; FT 54 Kepong-Kuala Selangor Highway; PY04 KA08 Sungai Buloh (Overhead bridge access to Entrance B); KA07 Kepong Sentral; PY08 Sri Damansara Timur; Jalan Kepong; PY09 Metro Prima (Entrance A for Kuala Selangor-bound, Entrance B for Kuala Lumpur-bound); PY10 Kepong Baru; PY11 Jinjang; PY12 Sri Delima; Jalan Sultan Azlan Shah (Jalan Ipoh); PY14 Kentonmen; PY15 Jalan Ipoh; MR10 Chow Kit; Jalan Tuanku Abdul Rahman; SP5 AG5 Sultan Ismail; Jalan Dang Wangi	
107	Selangor Omnibus	Bestari Jaya	Medan Pasar, Kuala Lumpur ( AG7 SP7 KJ13 Masjid Jamek)	Jalan Bukit Badong; Ijok; FT 54 Kepong-Kuala Selangor Highway; PY04 KA08 Sungai Buloh (Overhead bridge access to Entrance B); KA07 Kepong Sentral; PY08 Sri Damansara Timur; Jalan Kepong; PY09 Metro Prima (Entrance A for Kuala Selangor-bound, Entrance B for Kuala Lumpur-bound); PY10 Kepong Baru; PY11 Jinjang; PY12 Sri Delima; Jalan Sultan Azlan Shah (Jalan Ipoh); PY14 Kentonmen; PY15 Jalan Ipoh; MR10 Chow Kit; Jalan Tuanku Abdul Rahman; SP5 AG5 Sultan Ismail; Jalan Dang Wangi	
801(Terminated)	Rapid KL	Bandar Utama bus hub	PY09 Metro Prima	Central Park Avenue; Damansara–Puchong Expressway (Bandar Utama); KG07 Mutiara Damansara (Entrance C for Metro Prima-bound, Entrance B for Bandar Utama-bound); Jalan PJU 8/1; Damansara–Puchong Expressway (Penchala Toll Plaza); Persiaran Ara; Persiaran Meranti; Persiaran Perdana; FT 5 Jalan Kuala Selangor; FT 28 Middle Ring Road 2 (MRR2); Jalan Kepong; PY09 Metro Prima (Entrance A for Metro Prima-bound, Entrance B for Bandar Utama-bound)	506(Terminated), PJ05, PJ06
