= Jinjang MRT station =

Railway station in Jinjang, Malaysia

PY11 Jinjang

General information
- Other names: Malay: جينجڠ (Jawi); Chinese: 增江; Tamil: ஜிஞ்சாங்
- Location: Jalan Kepong, Jinjang; 52000 Kuala Lumpur; Malaysia
- Coordinates: 3.20955195°N 101.65606396°E
- System: Rapid KL
- Owner: MRT Corp
- Operator: Rapid Rail
- Line: 12 Putrajaya Line
- Platforms: 1 island platform
- Tracks: 2

Construction
- Parking: Available
- Accessible: Yes

Other information
- Status: Operational
- Station code: PY11

History
- Opened: 16 June 2022; 4 years ago

Services
Preceding station		Following station
Kepong Baru towards Kwasa Damansara	Putrajaya Line	Sri Delima towards Putrajaya Sentral
Location

The Jinjang MRT station is a mass rapid transit (MRT) station in the township of Jinjang, Kuala Lumpur, Malaysia. It is one of the stations on the MRT Putrajaya Line.

The station began operations on 16 June 2022 as part of Phase One operations of the Putrajaya Line.

== Location ==
The station is located at the junction of Jalan Kepong and the Segambut Bypass.

== Station features ==
- Elevated station with an island platform
- Park & Ride

== Bus Services ==
MRT Feeder Bus and GOKL Cream Line Bus are available at the bus stop at Entrance B

=== Feeder buses ===
Route No.	Origin	Desitination	Via	Connecting to
T117	PY11 Jinjang (Entrance B)	Taman Sri Segambut	Jalan 1/32A; Jalan 5/32A; Jalan 4/40; Jalan Udang Rawa; Jalan Udang Kepai; Segambut Bypass	Terminus
MAGENTA	PY11 Jinjang (Entrance B)	MATRADE	Jalan Kepong Baru; Jalan Mergastua; Jalan Udang Kepai; KA05A Segambut Utara; Segambut Bypass; KA05 Segambut; Persiaran Dutamas; Federal Territory Mosque	Terminus

=== Other buses ===
Route No.	Operator	Origin	Desitination	Via	Connecting to
100	Selangor Omnibus	Terminal Malawati, Kuala Selangor	Medan Pasar, Kuala Lumpur ( AG7 SP7 KJ13 Masjid Jamek)	FT 5 Jalan Kuala Selangor; Ijok; FT 54 Kepong-Kuala Selangor Highway; PY04 KA08 Sungai Buloh (Overhead bridge access to Entrance B); KA07 Kepong Sentral; PY08 Sri Damansara Timur; PY09 Metro Prima; PY10 Kepong Baru; PY11 Jinjang (Bus stand in Taman Fadason for KL-bound only); PY12 Sri Delima; Jalan Sultan Azlan Shah (Jalan Ipoh); PY14 Kentonmen; PY15 Jalan Ipoh; MR10 Chow Kit; Jalan Tuanku Abdul Rahman; SP5 AG5 Sultan Ismail; Jalan Dang Wangi	
103	Selangor Omnibus	Damansara Damai	Medan Pasar, Kuala Lumpur ( AG7 SP7 KJ13 Masjid Jamek)	Jalan PJU 10/1; FT 54 Kepong-Kuala Selangor Highway; PY04 KA08 Sungai Buloh (Overhead bridge access to Entrance B); KA07 Kepong Sentral; PY08 Sri Damansara Timur; PY09 Metro Prima; PY10 Kepong Baru; PY11 Jinjang (Bus stand in Taman Fadason for KL-bound only); PY12 Sri Delima; Jalan Sultan Azlan Shah (Jalan Ipoh); PY14 Kentonmen; PY15 Jalan Ipoh; MR10 Chow Kit; Jalan Tuanku Abdul Rahman; SP5 AG5 Sultan Ismail; Jalan Dang Wangi	
104	Selangor Omnibus	Wangsa Permai	Medan Pasar, Kuala Lumpur ( AG7 SP7 KJ13 Masjid Jamek)	Desa Aman Puri; Persiaran Cemara; Persiaran Jati; FT 54 Kepong-Kuala Selangor Highway; PY04 KA08 Sungai Buloh (Overhead bridge access to Entrance B); KA07 Kepong Sentral; PY08 Sri Damansara Timur; PY09 Metro Prima; PY10 Kepong Baru; PY11 Jinjang (Bus stand in Taman Fadason for KL-bound only); PY12 Sri Delima; Jalan Sultan Azlan Shah (Jalan Ipoh); PY14 Kentonmen; PY15 Jalan Ipoh; MR10 Chow Kit; Jalan Tuanku Abdul Rahman; SP5 AG5 Sultan Ismail; Jalan Dang Wangi	
107	Selangor Omnibus	Bestari Jaya	Medan Pasar, Kuala Lumpur ( AG7 SP7 KJ13 Masjid Jamek)	Jalan Bukit Badong; Ijok; FT 54 Kepong-Kuala Selangor Highway; PY04 KA08 Sungai Buloh (Overhead bridge access to Entrance B); KA07 Kepong Sentral; PY08 Sri Damansara Timur; PY09 Metro Prima; PY10 Kepong Baru; PY11 Jinjang (Bus stand in Taman Fadason for KL-bound only); PY12 Sri Delima; Jalan Sultan Azlan Shah (Jalan Ipoh); PY14 Kentonmen; PY15 Jalan Ipoh; MR10 Chow Kit; Jalan Tuanku Abdul Rahman; SP5 AG5 Sultan Ismail; Jalan Dang Wangi	
