= Telekom Museum =

Museum in Kuala Lumpur, Malaysia

- Muzium Telekom
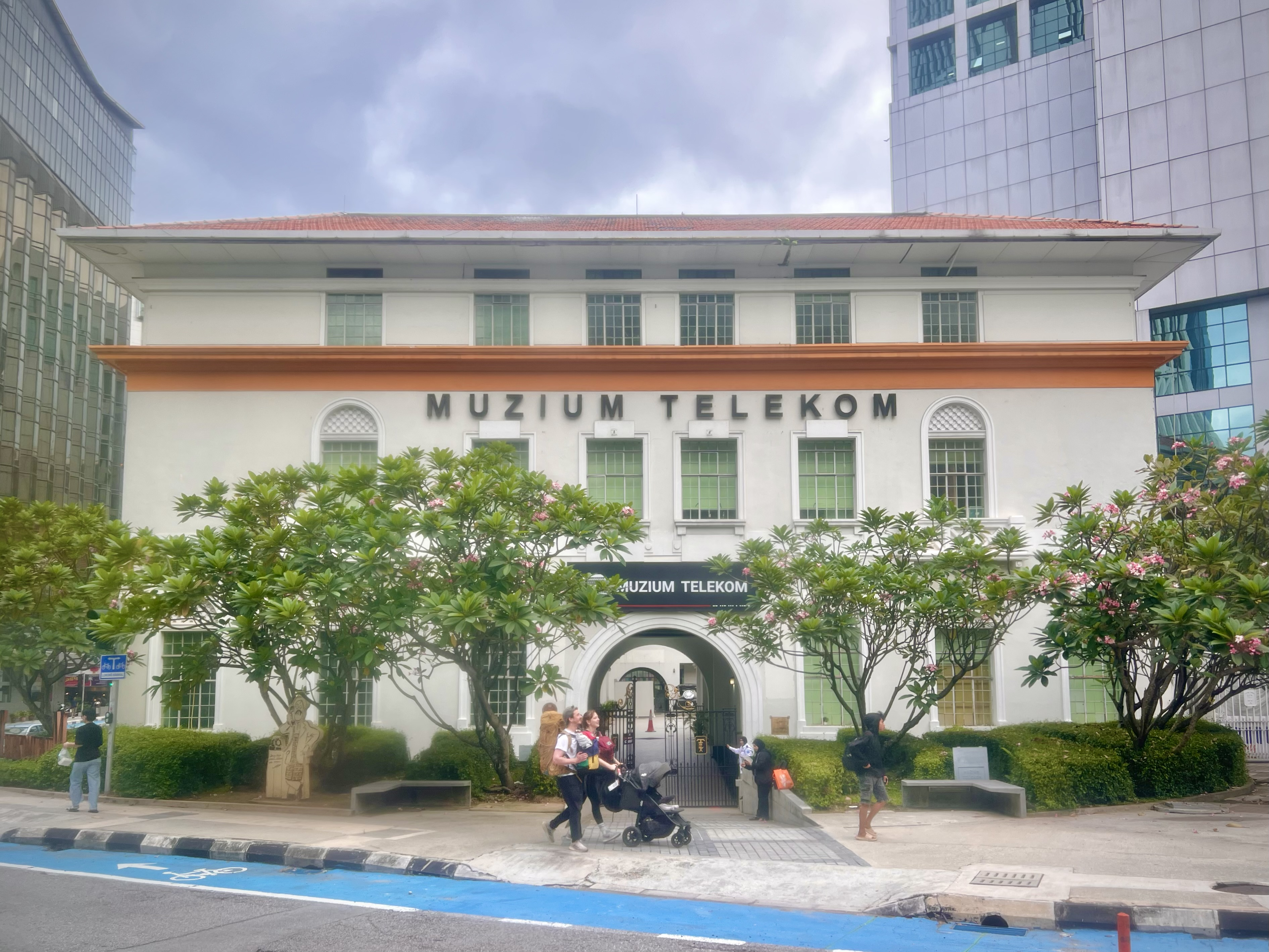
- Established: 3 June 1994
- Location: Kuala Lumpur, Malaysia
- Coordinates: 3°08′56″N 101°41′57″E
- Type: museum
- Owner: Telekom Malaysia

The Telekom Museum (Malay: Muzium Telekom) is a museum in Kuala Lumpur, Malaysia.

== History ==
The museum building was originally constructed in 1928. It was originally used as the office for manual telephone exchange and upgraded to mechanical telephone exchange in 1938.

In the early 1980s, Telekom Malaysia was searching a space to house their office and to store their telecommunication equipment in Kuala Lumpur. In 1984, they identified the building to be the appropriate site. The plan however was cancelled in 1985 when Prime Minister Mahathir Mohamad proposed the building to be conserved as a national heritage. Telekom Malaysia then decided to turn the building into a museum with a cost of MYR10 million. The construction of the museum was done in 1989–1992 and the museum material and collections were collected in 1993–1994. On 3 June 1994, the museum was officially opened to the public.

== Architecture ==
The museum building utilizes the forms and aspects of Neoclassical Greek architecture.

== Transportation ==
The museum is accessible within walking distance east of Masjid Jamek LRT Station.

== See also ==
- List of museums in Malaysia
- Telekom Malaysia (company)
