= Medan Pasar bus hub =

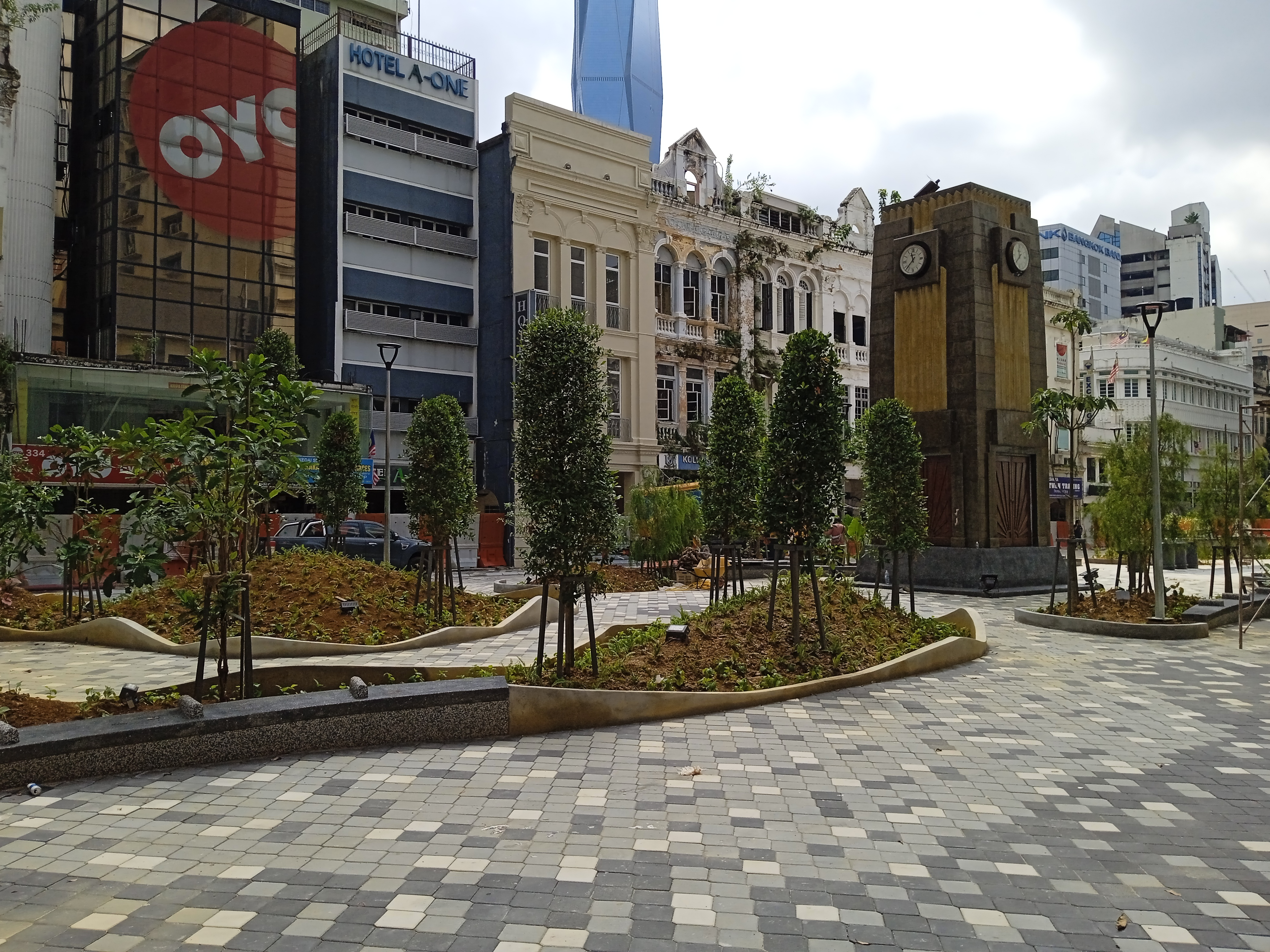
Former site of Medan Pasar bus hub

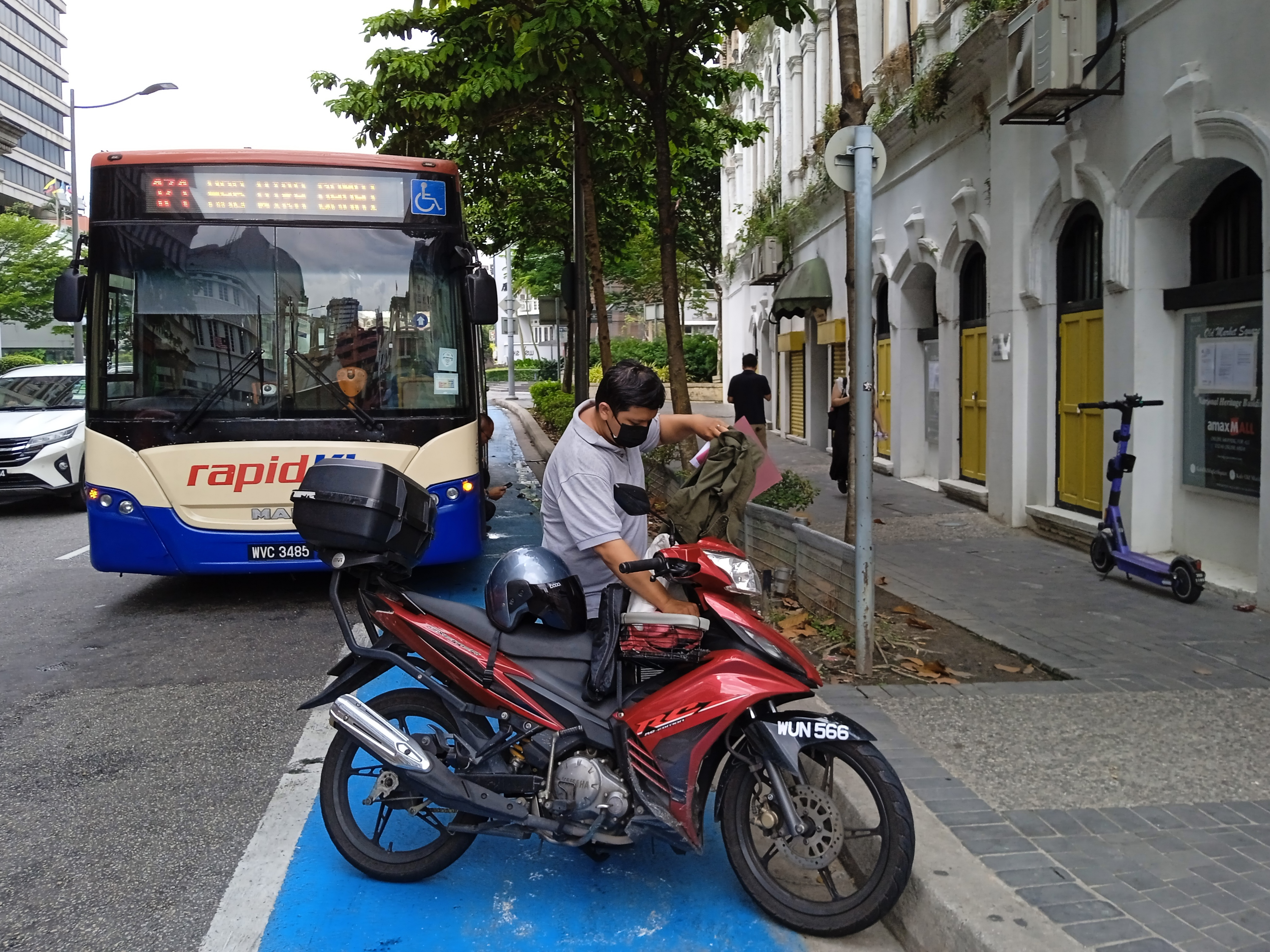
Hab Medan Pasar (LPB) bus stop served Rapid KL's bus

Medan Pasar bus hub was a major bus interchange in Kuala Lumpur. It is a 200 m walk away from Masjid Jamek LRT station. Currently being replaced by Lebuh Ampang as route terminal.

This bus hub is served by rapidKL buses as well as other private bus operators such as Metrobus Nationwide & Selangor Omnibus Company Limited which operates line 100 (Medan Pasar - Kepong - MRT/KTM Sungai Buloh - Kuala Selangor).
