= Jinjang =

Jinjang 增江
- Suburb
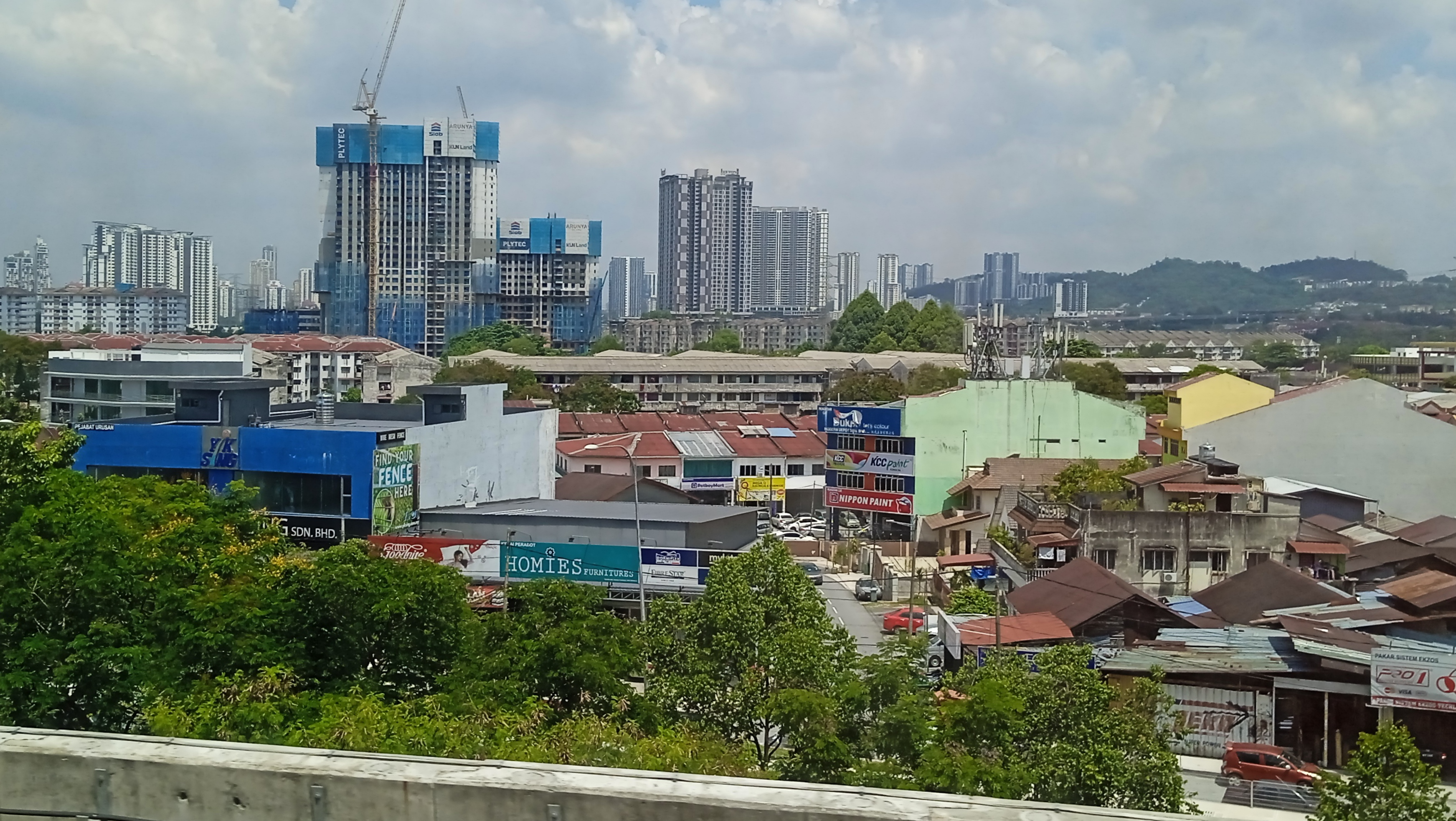
- Taman Jinjang Baru, Jinjang

- Location within Kuala Lumpur
- Coordinates: 3°12′33″N 101°39′21″E
- Country: Malaysia
- State: Kuala Lumpur
- Constituency: Kepong

Government
  - Local Authority: Kuala Lumpur City Council (DBKL)
  - Mayor: Kamarulzaman Mat Salleh
- Time zone: UTC+8 (MST)
- Postcode: 52000

Jinjang, also known as J-Town, is a township and Chinese new village in the Kepong constituency in north-western Kuala Lumpur, Malaysia, about 8.5 km from KLCC.

Jinjang is composed of Jinjang Utara (North) and Jinjang Selatan (South), separated by Jalan Kepong (Malaysia Federal Route 54). It was previously known for the prevalence of 'gangsterism' from the 1960s.

== Etymology of the name ==
It has been believed that the name Jinjang was derived from the name of a pig brought to Malaya by a Chinese merchant in the 19th century. The pig was believed to be auspicious. The name Jinjang is the Malay transliteration of the its previous Chinese name of 增光 (Mandarin: zēng guāng, Cantonese: zang1 gwong1). The current Chinese name is 增江 (Mandarin: zēng jiāng), where its pronunciation in Mandarin matches more closely with the town's Malay name.

== History ==
The town in its modern form was established as part of the British strategy called the Briggs Plan during the Malayan Emergency. The strategy aimed to relocate the colony’s large rural ethnic Chinese population of Malaya into more concentrated and governable spaces; in an effort to cut off supplies – mainly food, money and military provisions – to the Malayan Communist Party (MCP) and Malayan National Liberation Army (MNLA). Jinjang was by far the largest of the resettlement areas (called "New Villages") on the outskirts of Kuala Lumpur, with an approximate population of 13,000, and at 445 hectares (4.45 km^{2}), nearly twice the size of the other New Villages combined.

During early post-independence years until the 1960s, the town gained a "fearsome" reputation due to the presence of bandit members; the notorious "Robin Hood" criminal Botak Chin was said to have been active in the area. Older residents surmised that the area's alleged seedy reputation likely stemmed from the fact that most early inhabitants were working-class and thus viewed with prejudice.

Along with the township of Kepong, Jinjang has been particularly prone to outbreaks of dengue fever, and the outbreak of the 1973 dengue epidemic which resulted in 969 reported cases and killed 54 people was traced to Jinjang.

== Transportation ==
The main road in Jinjang is Jalan Kepong (Malaysia Federal Route 54). It is connected to Kuala Lumpur Middle Ring Road 2, Jalan Kuching and Jalan Ipoh (Kuala Lumpur–Rawang Highway), Damansara–Puchong Expressway (LDP), as well as Duta–Ulu Klang Expressway (DUKE).

It is served by Jinjang MRT station and Sri Delima MRT station - on the MRT Putrajaya Line, with operations began on 16 June 2022. There are 2 Rapid KL feeder bus lines (T117, T121) from the 2 MRT stations.

== Education ==
=== Primary schools ===
There are at least four Chinese national-type primary schools (SJK(C)) in the township:

- SJKC Jinjang Selatan
- SJKC Jinjang Tengah 1
- SJKC Jinjang Tengah 2
- SJKC Jinjang Utara

National-type

- SK La Selle (1) Jinjang
- SK La Selle (2) Jinjang
- SIRAJ Abu Dzar Al-Ghifari

=== Secondary Schools ===
- SMK Jinjang
- SMK Raja Abdullah

== Religion ==
Since most of the population is Chinese, there are many Bhuddist and Taoist temples in Jinjang. Examples include Fu Ze Tang (福泽堂), Nan Yang Kong (南阳宫), and Feng Shan Si (凤山寺).

== Facilities ==
- Klinik Kesihatan Jinjang
- Klinik Pergigian Jinjang
- Jinjang Fire and Rescue Station
- Jinjang Police Station

== Places of Interest ==
- Brem Mall
- Crystal Crown Hotel Kuala Lumpur

== Gallery ==
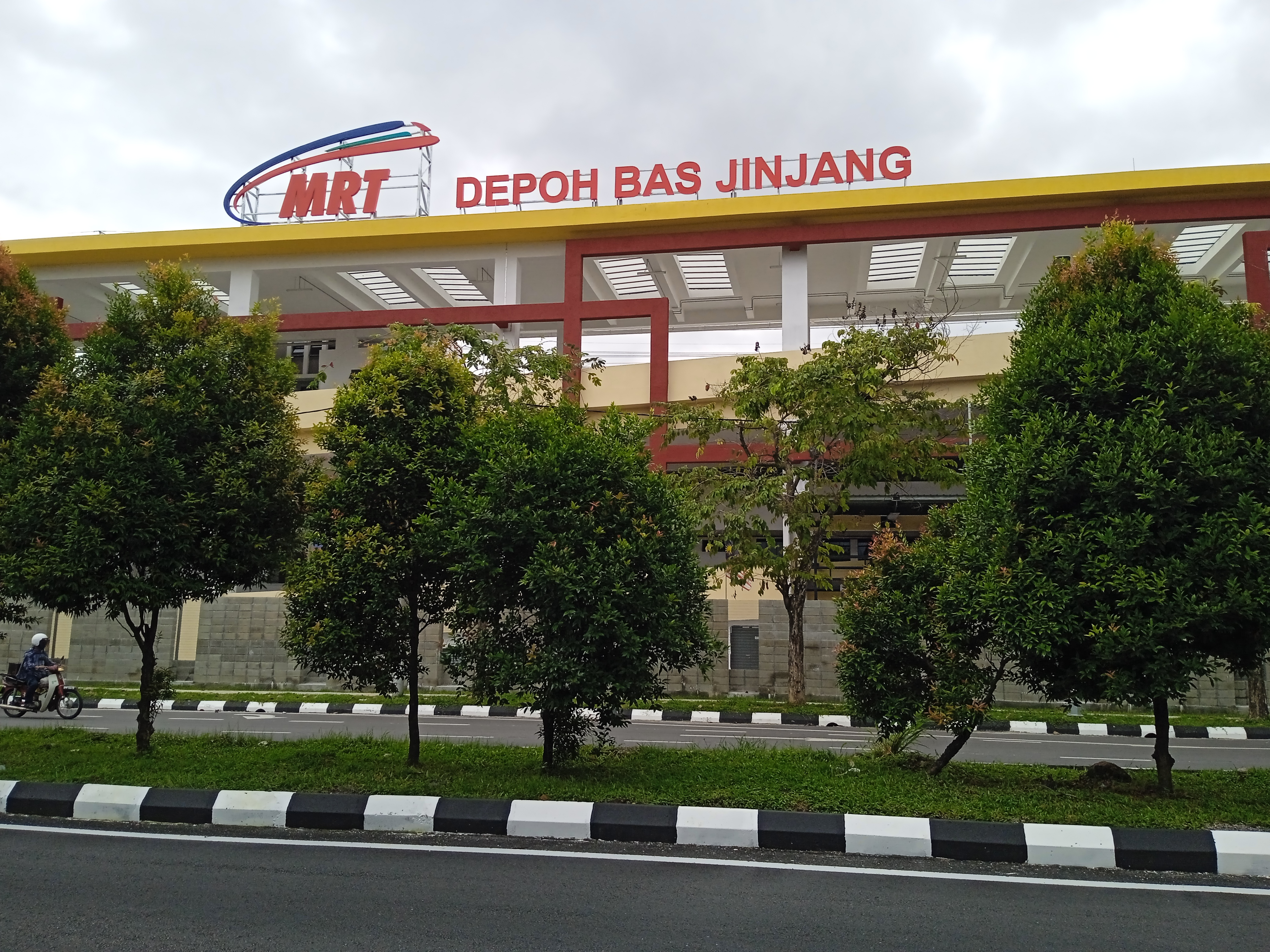
Depoh Bas Pengantara MRT Jinjang, 2022

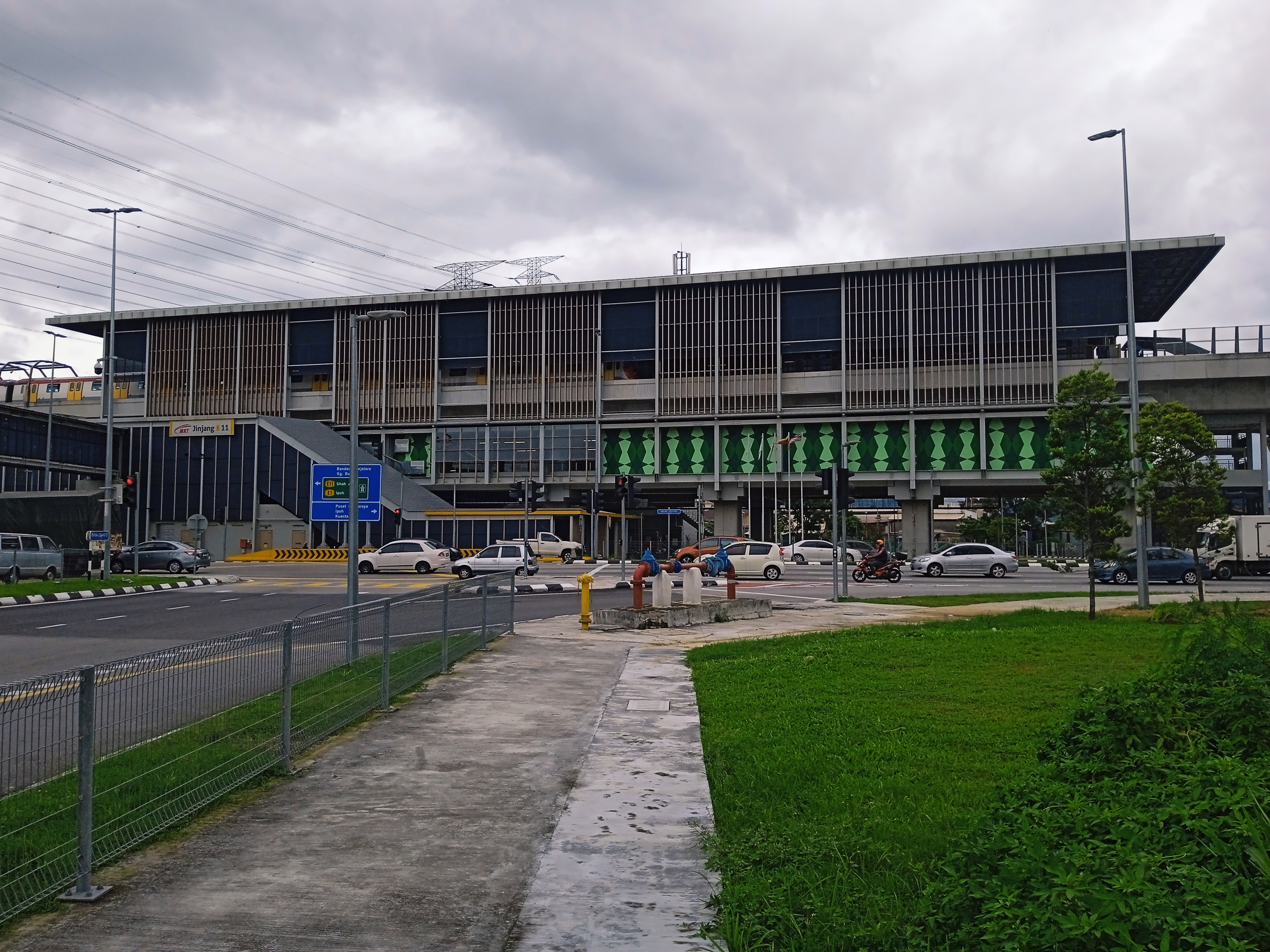
Jinjang MRT station, 2022

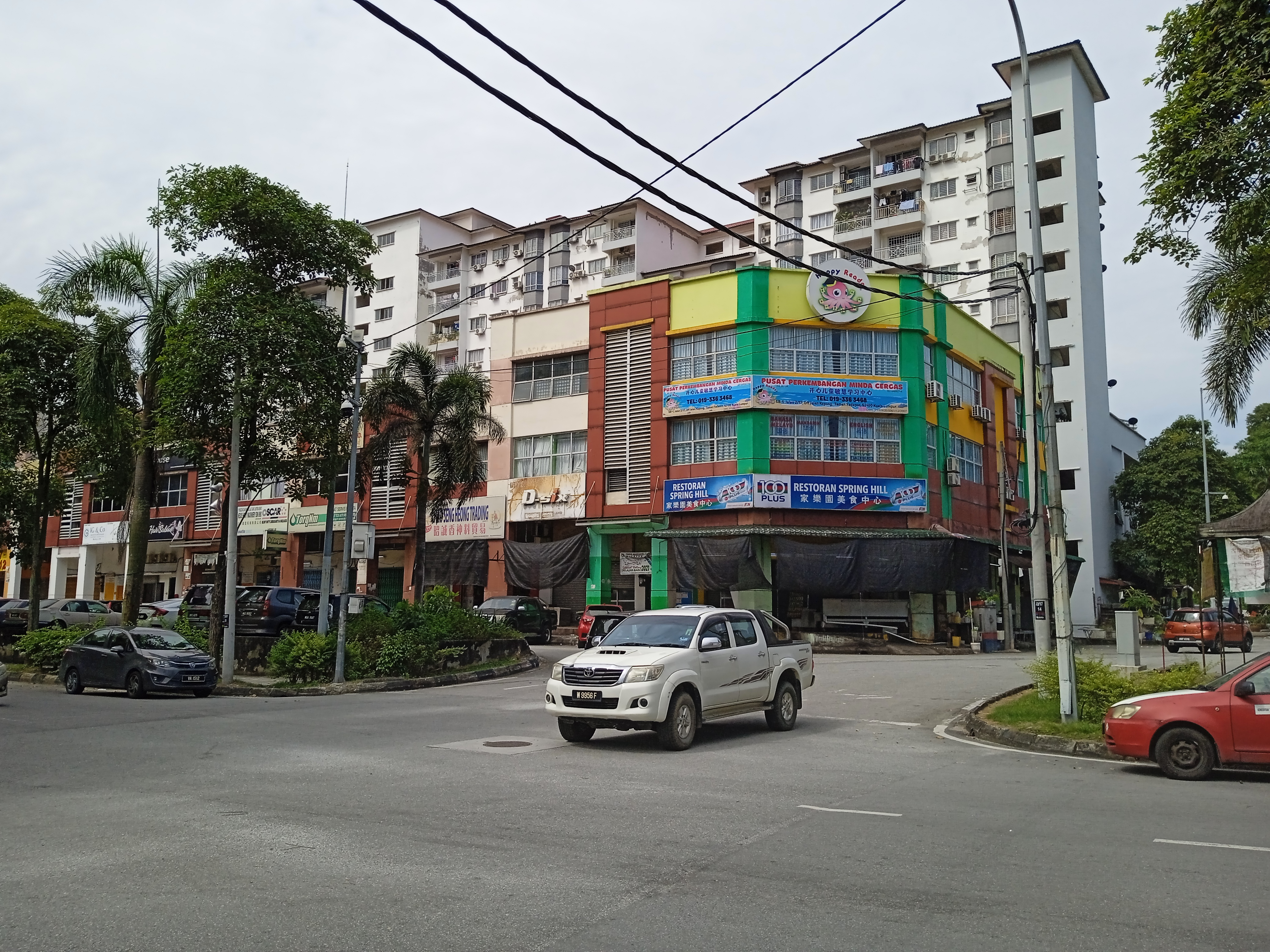
Taman Fadason in Jinjang, 2023

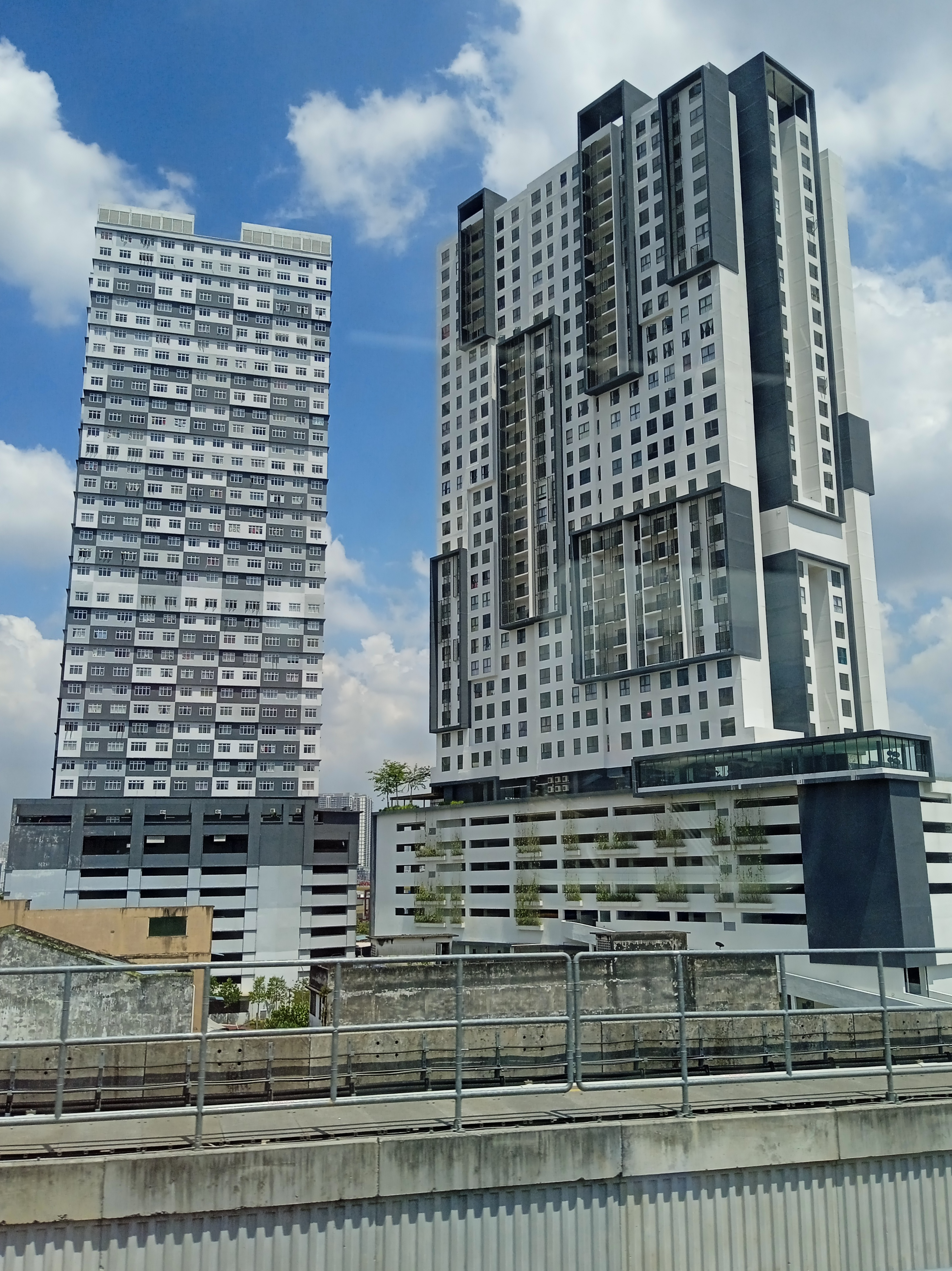
Residensi eNesta Kepong, 2023

Jalan Benteng Barat, Jinjang, 2022

Pusat Penjaja Jinjang Utara, 2022

== See also ==
- New Village
