= Kepong Baru MRT station =

Railway station in Kepong, Malaysia

PY10 Kepong Baru
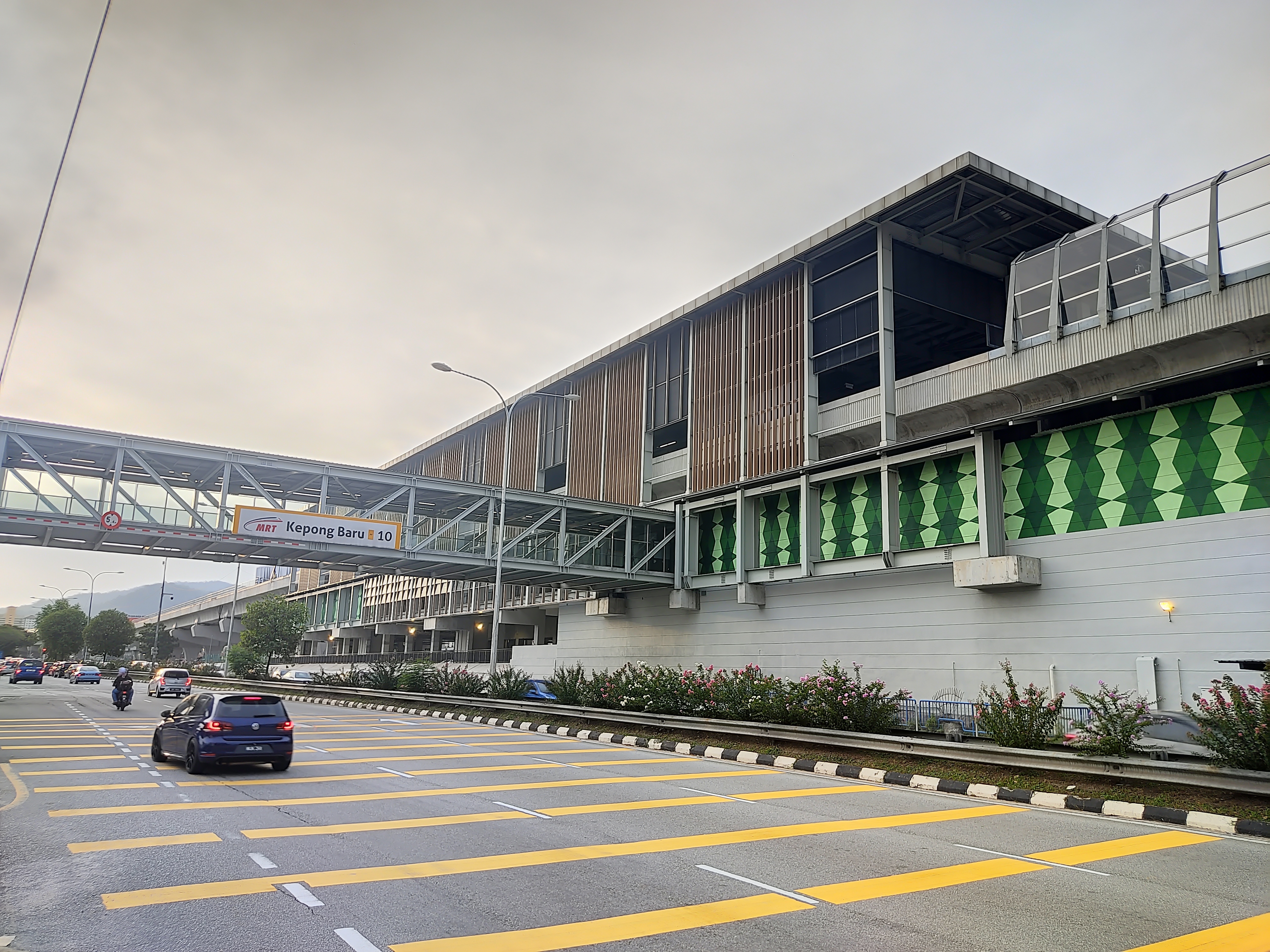

General information
- Other names: Malay: کڤوڠ بارو (Jawi); Chinese: 甲洞卫星市; Tamil: கெப்போங் பாரு
- Location: Jalan Kepong, Laman Rimbunan; 52100 Kuala Lumpur; Malaysia
- Coordinates: 3.211890°N 101.648040°E
- System: Rapid KL
- Owner: MRT Corp
- Operator: Rapid Rail
- Line: 12 Putrajaya Line
- Platforms: 1 island platform
- Tracks: 2

Construction
- Parking: Available
- Accessible: Yes

Other information
- Status: Operational
- Station code: PY10

History
- Opened: 16 June 2022; 4 years ago

Services
Preceding station		Following station
Metro Prima towards Kwasa Damansara	Putrajaya Line	Jinjang towards Putrajaya Sentral
Location

The Kepong Baru MRT station is an elevated mass rapid transit (MRT) station in Kepong, Kuala Lumpur, Malaysia. Served by the MRT Putrajaya Line, the station is located along Jalan Kepong near the junction with Jalan Api Api 1 and Jalan Kepong Baru.

The station began operations on 16 June 2022 as part of Phase One operations of the Putrajaya Line. Like the other elevated stations on the line, Kepong Baru station has a Serambi-style design complimented with Japanese zen features. The station is designed by Ong&Ong.

== Location ==
The station is located along Jalan Kepong.

There is a Buddhist temple called Jing Si Hall (Chinese: 靜思堂), affiliated with the Taiwanese Buddhist order Tzu Chi, located 250m southeast of the station.

== Station features ==
- Elevated station with an island platform

=== Exit and entrances ===
The MRT station has three entrances; A, B and C.

Putrajaya Line station
Entrance	Destination	Image
A	Jalan Rimbunan Raya 1 Feeder bus stop, taxi, e-hailing service and private vehicle lay-by, Laman Rimbunan, KWSP Kepong, Taman Usahawan Kepong. Park & Ride facility available here but with limited parking.	
B	Jalan Ambong Kiri; Feeder bus stop, taxi, e-hailing service and private vehicle lay-by, Kondominium Vista Mutiara, Dewan Jing Si, Kepong Baru.	
C	Jalan Besar Kepong; Feeder bus stop, Jalan Kepong.	

== Bus service ==
=== Feeder bus ===
Route number	Origin	Destination	Via	Image
T115	KL2461; PY10 Kepong Baru (Entrance B)	Taman Sri Sinar	Jalan Kepong Baru; Jalan Mergastua; Jalan Belabas; Jalan Helang; Jalan Helang Sawah; Jalan Lang Kuning; Jalan Lang Perut Putih 8; Jalan 6/38A; Jalan 8/38A; Lebuh Menjalara	
