= Jalan Ipoh MRT station =

Railway station in Segambut, Malaysia

Coordinates: 3°11′21.5″N 101°40′52.2″E

PY15 Jalan Ipoh
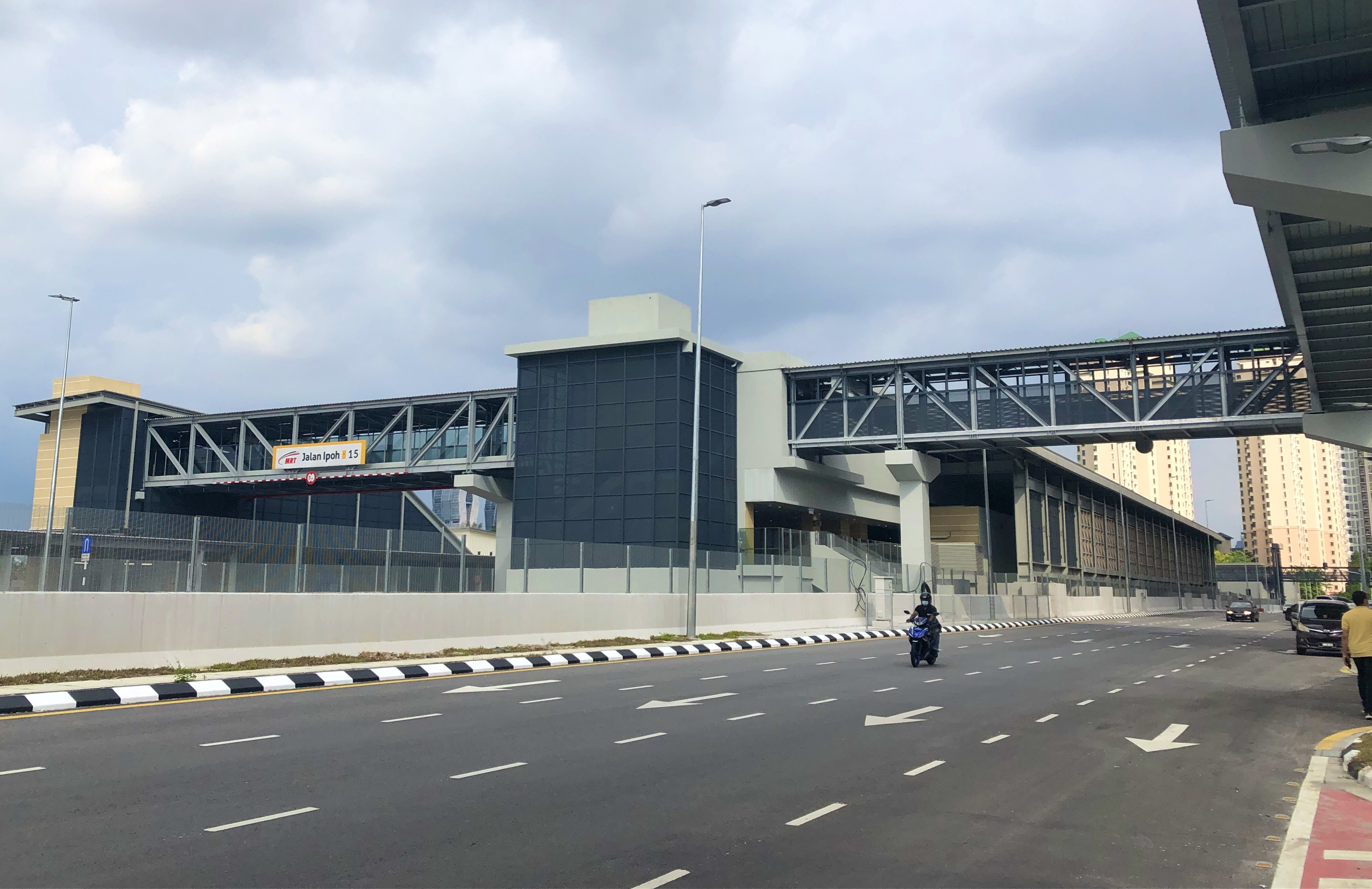

General information
- Other names: Malay: جالن ايڤوه (Jawi); Chinese: 怡保路; Tamil: ஜாலான் ஈப்போ
- Location: Jalan Sultan Azlan Shah, Taman Kaya, Segambut; 51100 Kuala Lumpur; Malaysia
- System: Rapid KL
- Owner: MRT Corp
- Operator: Rapid Rail
- Line: 12 Putrajaya Line
- Platforms: 1 island platform
- Tracks: 2

Construction
- Structure type: Half-sunken
- Parking: Not available
- Cycle facilities: Available
- Accessible: Yes

Other information
- Status: Operational
- Station code: PY15

History
- Opened: 16 March 2023; 3 years ago

Services
Preceding station		Following station
Kentonmen towards Kwasa Damansara	Putrajaya Line	Sentul Barat towards Putrajaya Sentral
Location

The Jalan Ipoh MRT station is a mass rapid transit (MRT) station that serves the suburb of Segambut and Taman Kaya in Kuala Lumpur, Malaysia. It is one of the stations as part of the Klang Valley Mass Rapid Transit (KVMRT) project on the MRT Putrajaya Line.

== Station features ==
=== Location ===
The station is located along Jalan Sultan Azlan Shah (formerly known as Jalan Ipoh) and is directly in front of the Mutiara Complex mall. It is one of three half-sunken or subsurface rapid transit stations in Malaysia; the platforms are below ground-level, while the station concourse is above ground, similar to the Sri Rampai LRT station on the LRT Kelana Jaya Line and the Hang Tuah LRT station on the LRT Ampang and Sri Petaling Lines.

Schools such as the Chong Hwa Independent High School, SJK (C) Lai Chee and SMK (P) Jalan Ipoh are within walking distance from the station. Nearby residential buildings served by this station include Sang Suria Condominium, The Maple and The Pano.

=== Exits and entrances ===
This station has 3 entrances. Entrance A is the closest to the Mutiara Complex, Entrance B is located on the opposite side of the road near Taman Kaya and the schools, while Entrance C is located the furthest away from the station near the bus stop and taxi stand.

Putrajaya Line station
Entrance	Location	Destination	Picture
A	Mutiara Complex	eGarage Auto Services, Wisma Kah Motor, SMK (P) Jalan Ipoh and The Pano Condominium	
B	East side of Jalan Sultan Azlan Shah	Feeder bus stop, Taxi and E-hailing Layby, Jalan St Thomas, Jalan Vethavanam, Taman Kaya, Chong Hwa Independent High School, SJK (C) Lai Chee and Sang Suria Condominium	
C	West side of Jalan Sultan Azlan Shah	Feeder bus stop, taxi and e-hailing layby, Jalan Sultan Azlan Shah (Jalan Ipoh)	

== Accessibility ==
The station is easily accessible from the Mutiara Complex and its surroundings via a non-integrated pedestrian bridge walkway right above Jalan Sultan Azlan Shah.

== See also ==
- Sri Rampai and Hang Tuah, similar half-sunken station structure
