= Sultan Ismail LRT station =

Metro station in Kuala Lumpur, Malaysia

AG5 SP5 Sultan Ismail
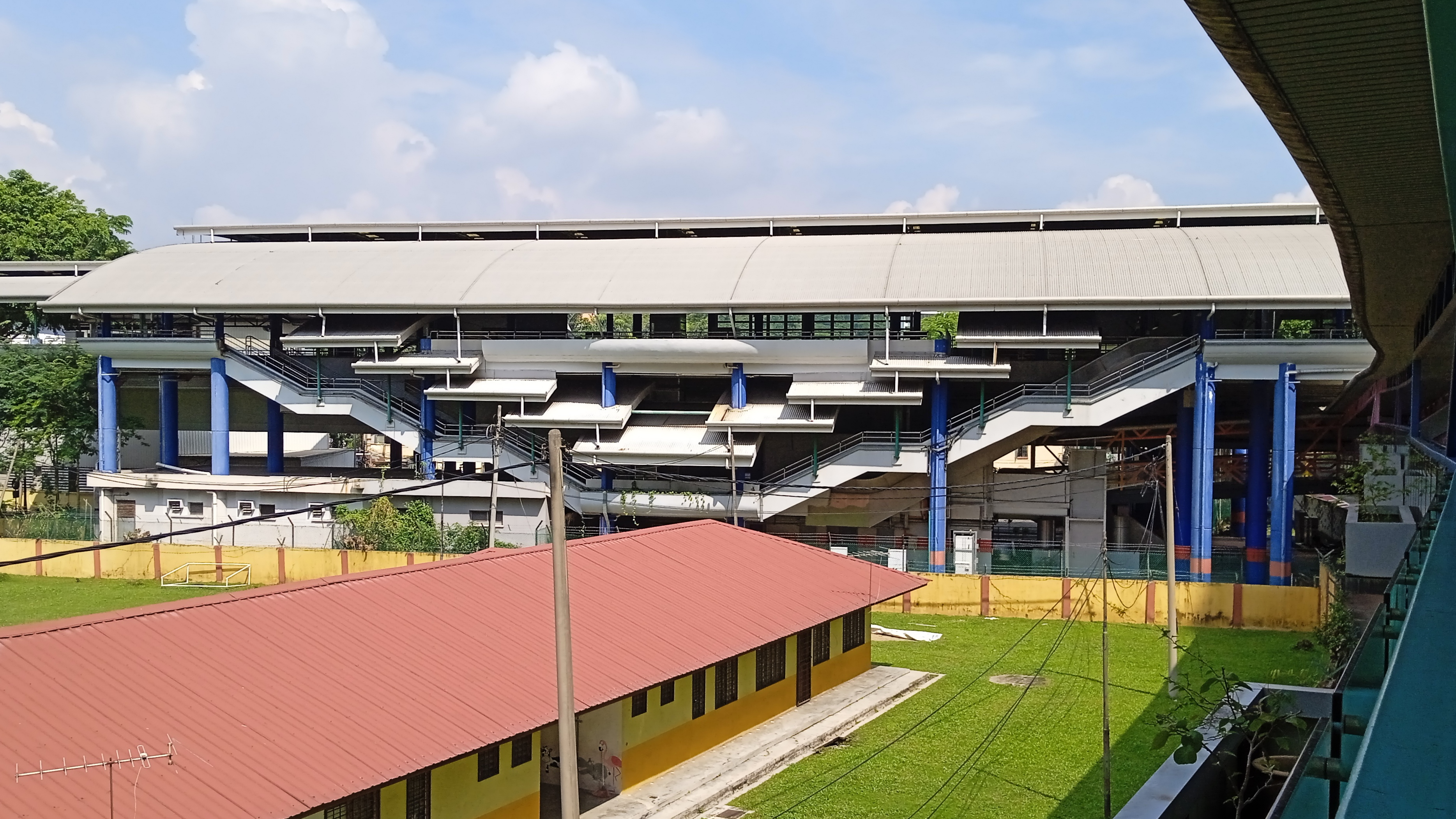
- Exterior view of the station

General information
- Other names: Malay: سلطان إسماعيل (Jawi); Chinese: 苏丹依斯迈; Tamil: சுல்தான் இஸ்மாயில்
- Location: Sultan Ismail LRT station, Jalan Sultan Ismail, Chow Kit; 50250 Kuala Lumpur; Malaysia
- Coordinates: 3°9′40″N 101°41′38″E
- System: Rapid KL
- Owner: Prasarana Malaysia
- Operator: Rapid Rail
- Lines: 3 Ampang Line; 4 Sri Petaling Line
- Platforms: 2 side platforms
- Tracks: 2
- Connections: Connecting station to MR9 Medan Tuanku via a 580 meters linkbridge

Construction
- Structure type: Elevated
- Platform levels: 2
- Parking: Not available
- Cycle facilities: Not available
- Accessible: Available

Other information
- Station code: AG5 SP5

History
- Opened: 16 December 1996; 29 years ago

Services
Preceding station		Following station
PWTC towards Sentul Timur	Ampang Line	Bandaraya towards Ampang
PWTC towards Sentul Timur	Sri Petaling Line	Bandaraya towards Putra Heights
Location

Sultan Ismail LRT station is a light rapid transit (LRT) station in Kuala Lumpur, Malaysia. The station serves a single line that is shared by both the Ampang & Sri Petaling Lines.

The station was opened on 16 December 1996, as part of the first phase of the former STAR LRT system's opening, alongside 13 adjoining stations along the Ampang-Sultan Ismail route, and was also the terminus of then alignment before the line extended further north to Sentul Timur.

== Location ==
The station is situated just nearby the western edge of Jalan Sultan Ismail, and stands between the Jalan Batu Boy's Primary School and Chung Kwok Primary School. Malaysia's leading multinational conglomerate Sime Darby's head office is opposite this station. There is an artist impression of the station erected at the Jalan Batu Boy's Primary School.

== Nearby station ==
This station is connected to the MR9 Medan Tuanku Monorail station that is served by the KL Monorail Line, and is about 580 metres (0.36 mi) away by a pedestrian bridge. The two stations are designated as official connecting stations on official transit maps. The stations, however, do not have an integrated paid area; passengers are required to tap out of one station and tap in or purchase a new ticket at the next station when transferring between lines.

== Locality landmarks ==
- Kuala Lumpur Metropolitan University College
- Maju Junction Mall
- Plaza Grand Hotel
- Summit KL Hotel
- Premiera Hotel

== Station Features ==
The station adopts the standard elevated station design for the Ampang and Sri Petaling Lines, with two side platforms above the concourse level.

=== Layout ===
L2	Platform; Level	Side platform, doors will open on the left
L2	Platform; Level	→ Platform 1: 3 Ampang Line / 4 Sri Petaling Line towards AG1 SP1 Sentul Timur (PWTC)
L2	Platform; Level	← Platform 2: 3 Ampang Line towards AG18 Ampang (Bandaraya) ← Platform 2: 4 Sri Petaling Line towards SP31 Putra Heights (Bandaraya)
L2	Platform; Level	Side platform, doors will open on the left
L1	Concourse; Level	Ticketing machines, faregates to paid area, escalators, lifts, kiosks, customer service counter, and linkbridge to Medan Tuanku 8
G	Ground; Level	Ground entrance

=== Entrances and exits ===
The station has one main entrance/exit to and from the concourse area. The LRT-Monorail linkbridge is located at the concourse level just beside the station's entrance.

Ampang Line & Sri Petaling Line station
Entrance	Location	Destination	Picture
A	Jalan Sultan Ismail	SK (L) Jalan Batu, Wisma Sime Darby, Maju Junction	

== Gallery ==
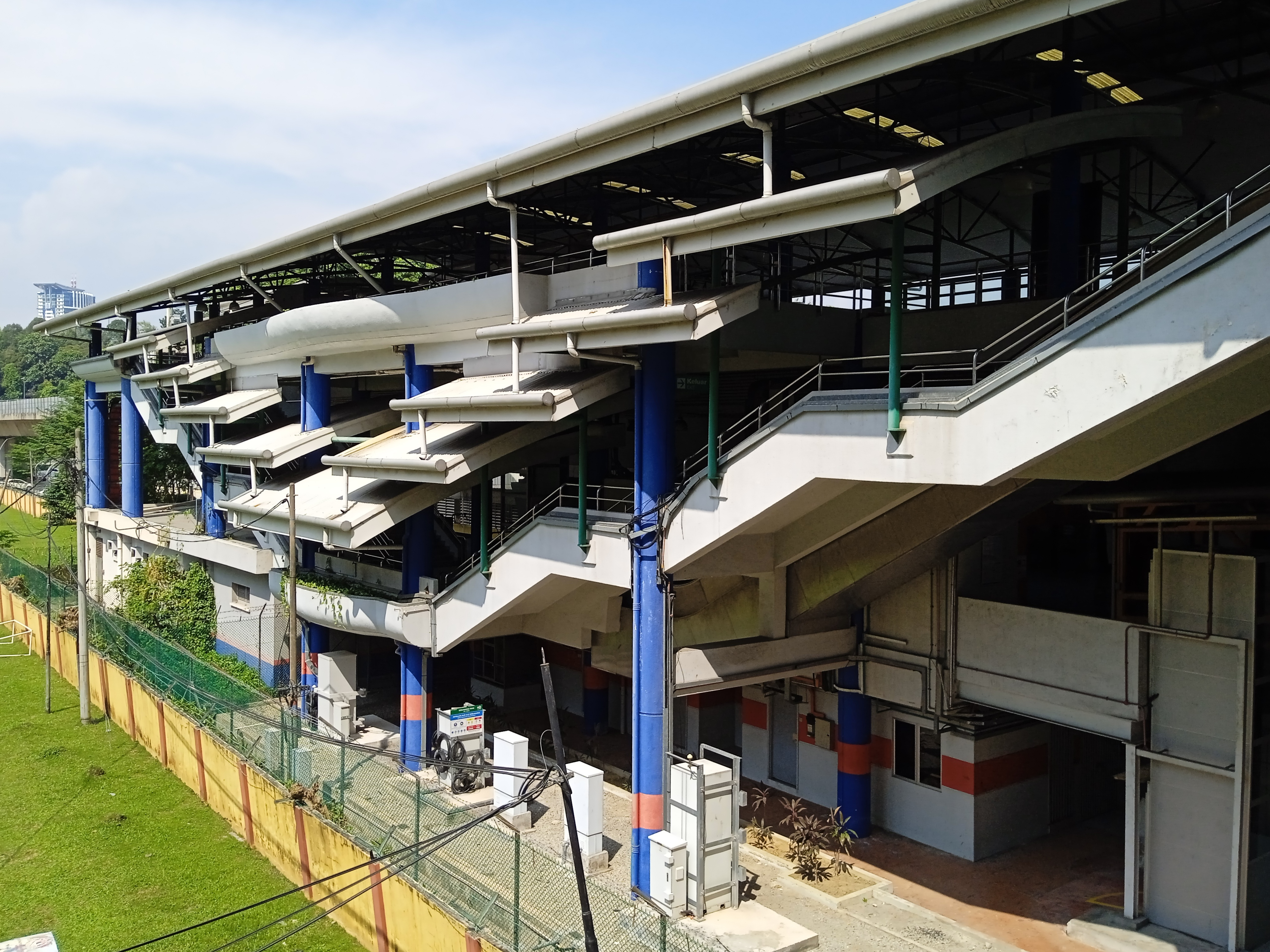
Close-up view of the station from the LRT-Monorail linkbridge

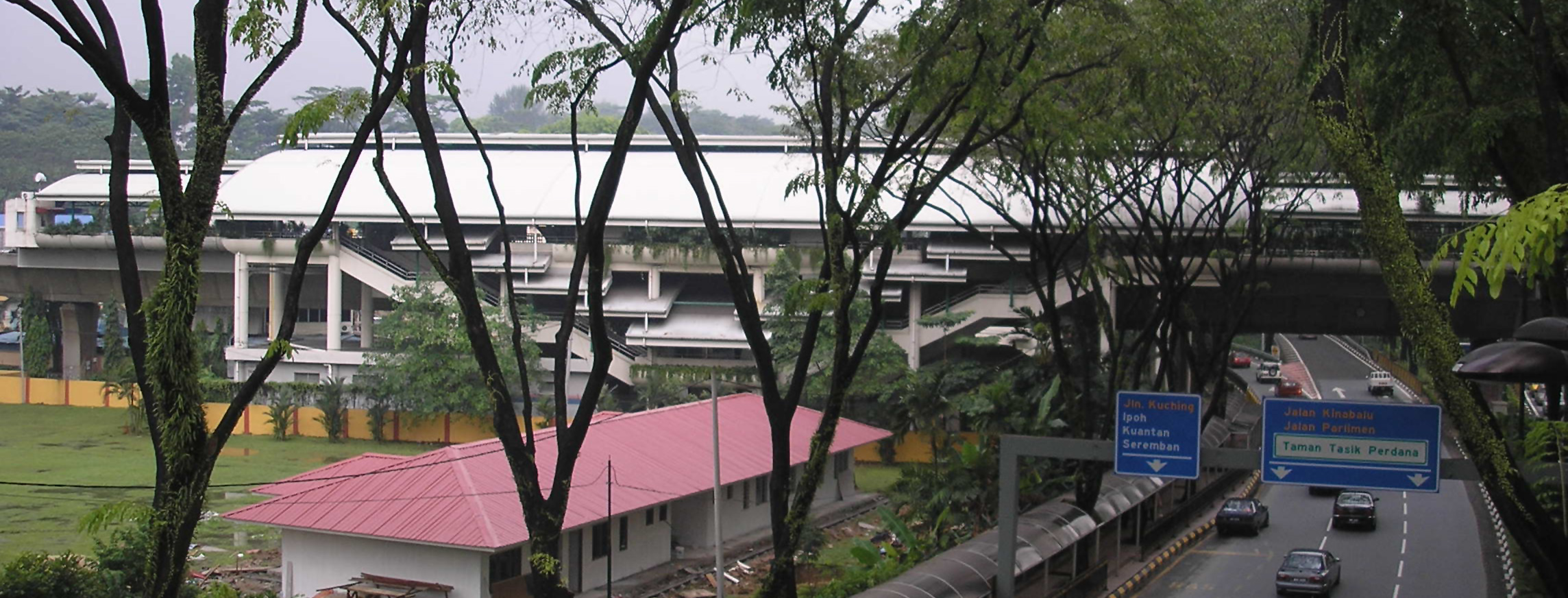
View of the station

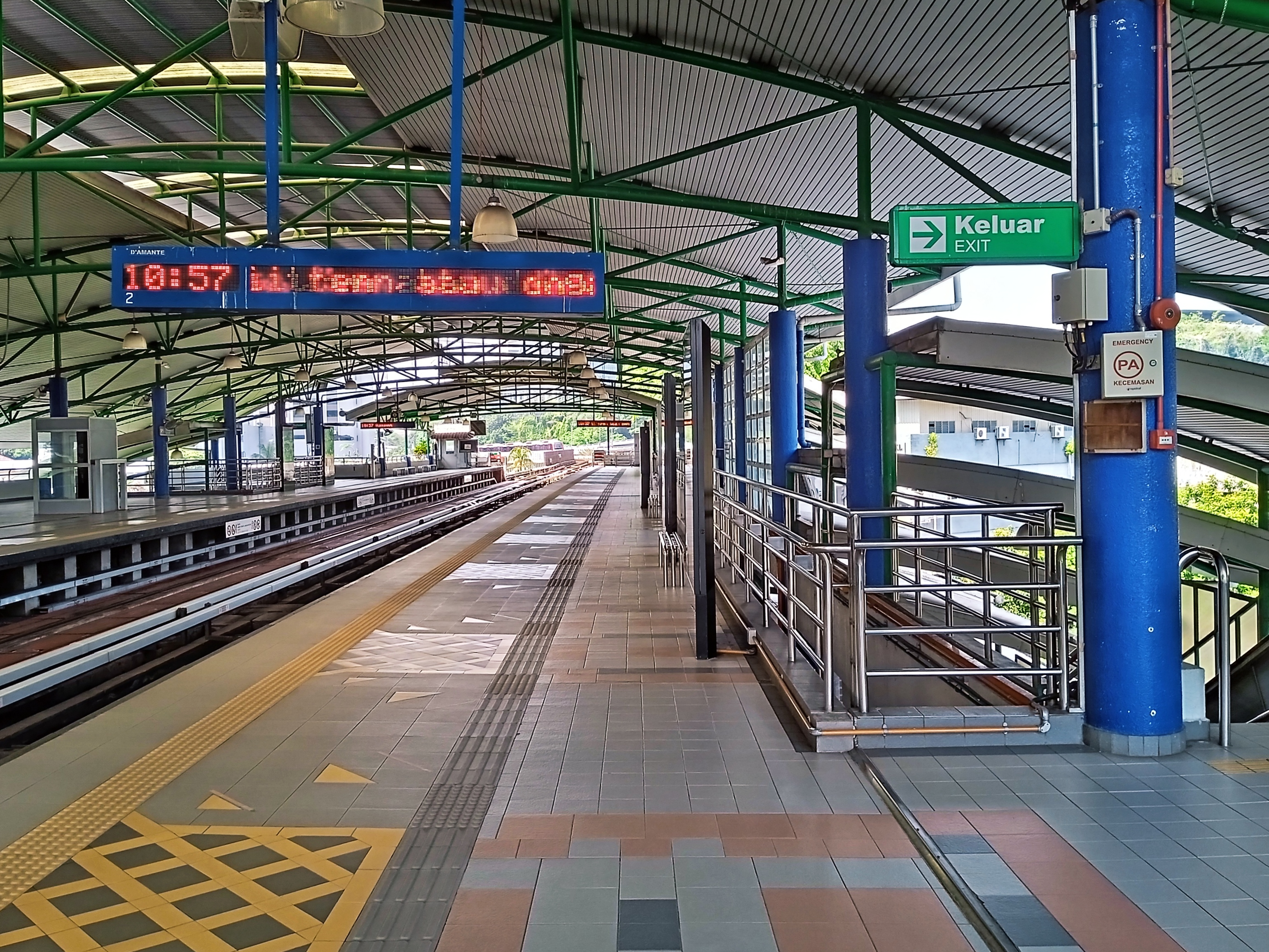
View of the station's platform

== See also ==
- List of rail transit stations in Klang Valley
