= Sentul =

Sentul may refer to:

== Plants ==
- Sandoricum koetjape, a tropical fruit grown in Southeast Asia

== In Indonesia ==
- Sentul, a village in Babakan Madang, Bogor Regency, West Java
  - Sentul City, a planned city
  - Sentul International Circuit, a motor racing circuit
  - Sentul International Convention Center

== In Malaysia ==
- Sentul, Kuala Lumpur, a suburb
- Sentul Komuter station
- Sentul LRT station
- Sentul Timur LRT station
- Sentul Barat MRT station
