= Jalan Sentul =

Road in Malaysia

Major junctions
- North end: Sentul Pasar
- FT 2 Jalan Kampung Bandar Dalam; Duta–Ulu Klang Expressway Duta–Ulu Klang Expressway; Sentul Link; Jalan Ipoh
- South end: Jalan Sultan Azlan Shah (Jalan Ipoh)

Location
- Country: Malaysia
- Primary destinations: Sentul

Highway system
- Highways in Malaysia; Expressways; Federal; State

Jalan Sentul is a major road in Kuala Lumpur, Malaysia.

== List of junctions ==
km	Exit	Junctions	To	Remarks
		Sentul Pasar		
		Jalan Kampung Bandar Dalam	Northeast; FT 2 Jalan Kampung Bandar Dalam; Gombak; Duta–Ulu Klang Expressway FT 2 AH141 Duta–Ulu Klang Expressway; Batu Caves; Kuantan	T-junctions
		Sentul Garden		
		Taman Dato' Senu		Junctions
		Jalan Sentul Ramp-DUKE Entry	Duta–Ulu Klang Expressway Duta–Ulu Klang Expressway; Duta–Sentul Pasar–Ulu Klang Link (Main Link); West; North–South Expressway Northern Route AH2 Ipoh; Sprint Expressway Petaling Jaya; FT 1 Segambut; FT 54 Kepong; FT 1 Sentul; FT 1 Kuala Lumpur city centre	Ramp in from expressway
		Jalan Lima Belas	East; Jalan Lima Belas; Sentul Timur; Sentul Timur LRT station	T-junctions
		Sentul		
		Jalan Perhentian	West; Jalan Perhentian; KTM Sentul Train Depot; Sentul Komuter station	Junctions
		Sentul Link	Sentul Link West; Bangsar; Petaling Jaya East; Sentul Timur; Sentul Timur LRT station	Junctions
		Sentul Selatan	East; Jalan 1/48; Sentul Timur; Sentul Timur LRT station	T-junctions
		Jalan Sultan Azlan Shah (Jalan Ipoh)	Jalan Sultan Azlan Shah (Jalan Ipoh) North; Segambut; Kepong; Rawang; Ipoh South; City centre Jalan Tuanku Abdul Rahman; Kuala Lumpur Middle Ring Road 1 Bangsar; Petaling Jaya; Ampang; Cheras; Seremban	T-junctions
