= Kampung Batu station =

Railway station in Bandar Baru Selayang, Malaysia

KC03 PY13 Kampung Batu

General information
- Other names: Malay: کامڤوڠ باتو (Jawi); Chinese: 甘榜峇都; Tamil: கம்போங் பத்து
- Location: Jalan 1/18B, Kampung Batu, Batu; 51200 Kuala Lumpur; Malaysia
- Coordinates: 3°12′16.8″N 101°40′32.2″E
- System: Rapid KL (MRT)
- Owner: Railway Assets Corporation (KTM); MRT Corp (MRT)
- Operator: Keretapi Tanah Melayu (KTM); Rapid Rail (MRT)
- Lines: Batu Caves branch; 12 Putrajaya Line
- Platforms: 2 side platforms (KTM); 2 side platforms (MRT)
- Tracks: 2 (KTM); 2 (MRT)

Construction
- Structure type: KC03 At-grade; PY13 Elevated
- Parking: Available
- Cycle facilities: Available
- Accessible: Yes

Other information
- Station code: KC03 PY13

History
- Opened: 1905; 121 years ago (KTM); 16 June 2022; 4 years ago (MRT)
- Rebuilt: 2010
- Electrified: 2010
- Former names: Batu Village (KTM)

Services
Preceding station	Keretapi Tanah Melayu (Komuter)	Following station
Taman Wahyu towards Batu Caves	Batu Caves–Pulau Sebang Line	Batu Kentonmen towards Pulau Sebang/Tampin
Preceding station		Following station
Sri Delima towards Kwasa Damansara	Putrajaya Line	Kentonmen towards Putrajaya Sentral
Location

Kampung Batu station is a Malaysian commuter rail and mass rapid transit (MRT) train station located on the west side of and named after the village of Kampung Batu (Batu Village) in northern Kuala Lumpur. It was built on the location of the disused colonial-era Batu Village railway station. The station is served by the KTM Batu Caves-Pulau Sebang Line and the MRT Putrajaya Line.

== Location and locality ==
The station is located near the Permai Ria condominium complex, which is part of the Taman Batu Permai housing area. The station is accessible from Jalan Sultan Azlan Shah (formerly known as Jalan Ipoh).

The station mainly serves the residents of Taman Batu Permai, Pekan Batu, Kampung Batu Muda, PPR Batu Muda, Ampat Tin military family quarters and the Taman Koperasi Polis housing area. The station is also accessible to Batu Caves and Sentul via bus services.

Taman Metropolitan Batu, a local lake park, is also situated nearby.

== KTM Komuter ==
The station was constructed between the Batu Caves and the Sentul railway stations as part of a single-track, unelectrified line that branches off the main West Coast Line. It fell into disuse, as with the rest of the railway line from Sentul to Batu Caves. As part of the Sentul Raya masterplan by YTL Corporation Berhad, the old Kampung Batu station was demolished and rebuilt for the KTM Komuter Port Klang-Sentul line extension.

Upon completion in July 2010, the station was served by the former Port Klang Line which ran from Port Klang to Batu Caves. In December 2015, following a change in the services of the KTM Komuter, the portion of the railway line between Sentul and Batu Caves stations, including Kampung Batu station, was transferred to the Seremban Line (now Batu Caves-Pulau Sebang Line), with trains now running between Pulau Sebang/Tampin and Batu Caves stations.

== MRT Putrajaya Line ==
A station on the MRT Putrajaya Line was constructed next to the existing KTM Komuter station. During Phase 1 operations of the line, this station was temporarily the terminus of the line, pending completion of the Kampung Batu-Putrajaya Sentral stretch under Phase 2.

The Kampung Batu MRT station commenced operations on 16 June 2022 at 3 pm. The MRT station is operated by Rapid Rail and is part of the Rapid KL transit system.

There is no paid-area integration between the two stations as they are operated by two different operators. Hence, despite sharing the same name for both lines, Kampung Batu is designated as a connecting station rather than an interchange.

== Feeder buses ==
Route 173

Route 173

- Go KL City Bus MAROON (to AG2 SP2 Sentul)
- Rapid KL T120 (Jalan Kampung Batu exit)
- Rapid KL 173
