= Batu, Kuala Lumpur =

Coordinates: 3°12′07″N 101°40′16″E

Batu
- Suburb
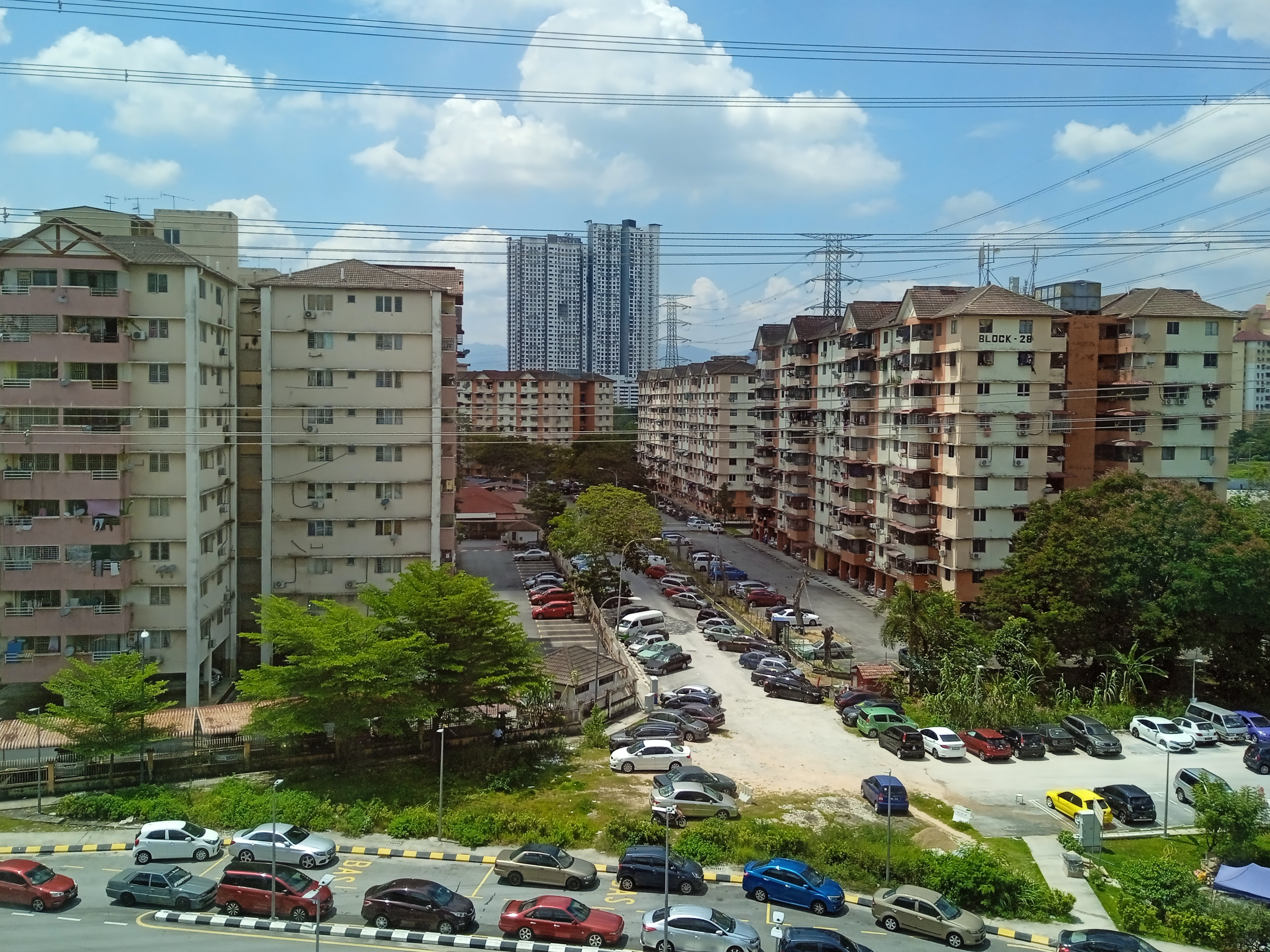
- Taman Batu Permai in Batu, Kuala Lumpur

- Location within Malaysia
- Country: Malaysia
- State: Federal Territory of Kuala Lumpur
- Constituency: Batu

Government
  - Local Authority: Dewan Bandaraya Kuala Lumpur
  - Mayor: Mhd Amin Nordin Abdul Aziz
- Time zone: UTC+8 (MST)

Batu is a parliamentary constituency in the northern outskirts of Kuala Lumpur, Malaysia, covering the area between Sentul and Batu Caves.

Settlements which are part of Batu constituency include Sentul. The constituency has the most Projek Perumahan Rakyat (PPR) public housing apartments and one of the highest rates of petty crime in the city.

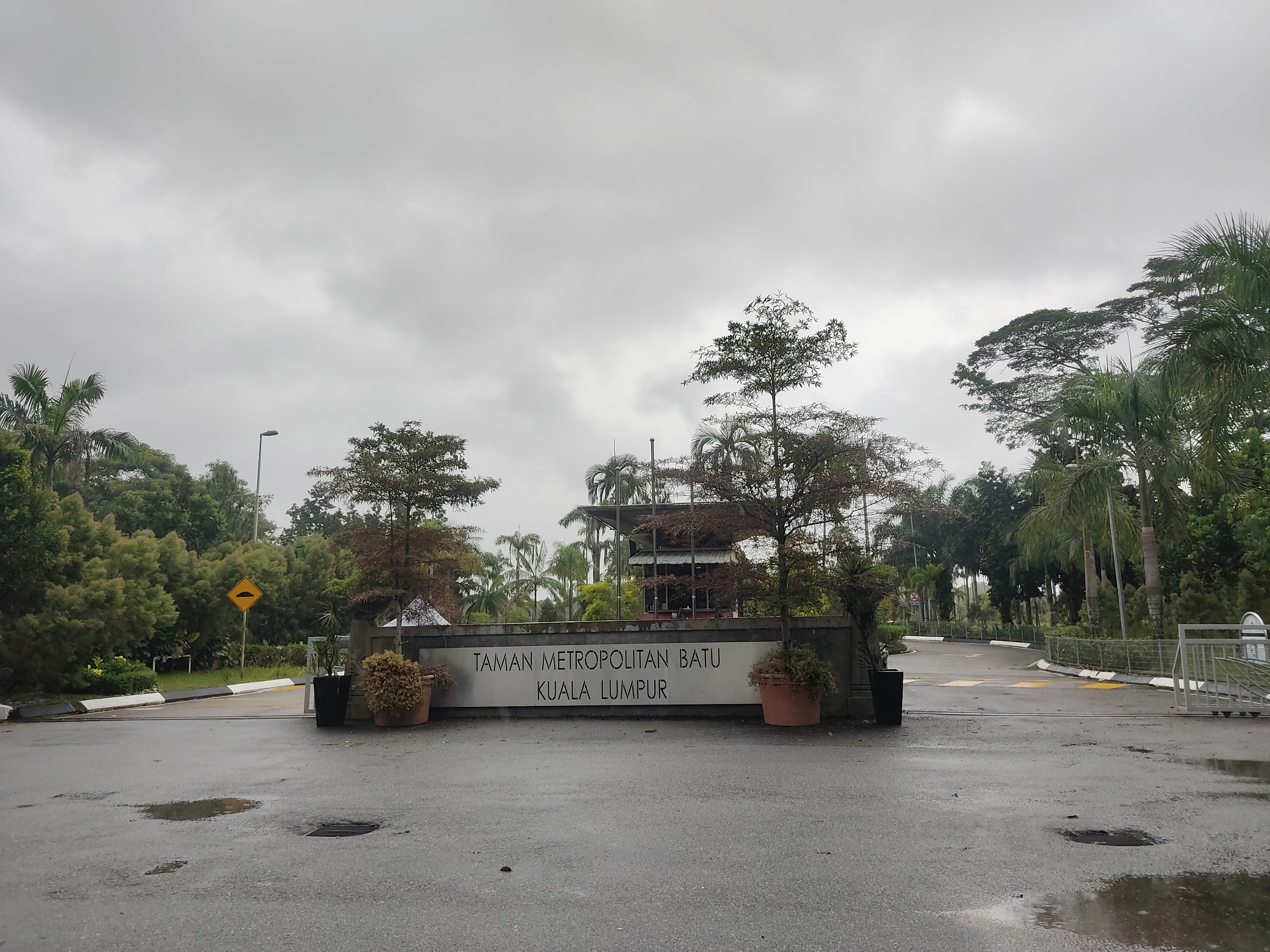
Batu Metropolitan Park

== Transportation ==
The Batu suburb is served by the Taman Wahyu, Kampung Batu and Batu Kentonmen Komuter stations on the KTM Komuter Seremban Line.

It is also served by the Kampung Batu, Kentonmen, as well as the Jalan Ipoh MRT stations on the MRT Putrajaya Line.

== Politics ==
The current Member of Parliament (MP) for the Batu parliamentary constituency is Prabakaran Parameswaran from Pakatan Harapan of PKR, who won the seat in the 2018 Malaysian general election. He is the youngest serving MP in Malaysia.

== See also ==
- Jalan Ipoh
