= Sentul Link =

Road in Kuala Lumpur, Malaysia

Route information
- Existed: 2004–present
- History: Completed in 2006

Major junctions
- West end: Kuala Lumpur Middle Ring Road 1
- Kuala Lumpur Middle Ring Road 1 Jalan Sentul
- East end: Sentul Timur

Location
- Country: Malaysia
- Primary destinations: Bandar Baru Sentul; Setapak; Gombak

Highway system
- Highways in Malaysia; Expressways; Federal; State

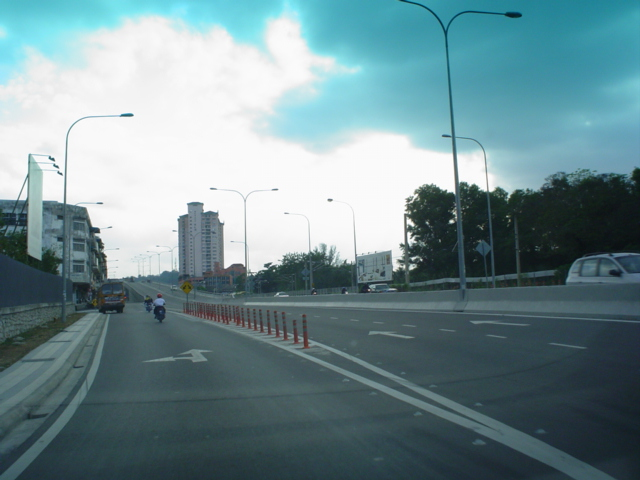
Sentul Link towards Mahameru Highway (MRR1)

The Sentul Link is a major highway in Kuala Lumpur city, Malaysia. It is maintained by the Kuala Lumpur City Hall or Dewan Bandaraya Kuala Lumpur.

== History ==
The Sentul Link connects the PWTC interchange of Jalan Kuching to Lebuhraya Mahameru to Sentul. Construction began in 2004 and was completed in mid-2006. The projects led by Kuala Lumpur City Hall (Dewan Bandaraya Kuala Lumpur). The Sentul Link was opened to traffic on 20 July 2006.

== List of interchange ==
Km	Exit	Interchange	To	Remarks
		Sentul Link flyover MRR1	Southwest; Kuala Lumpur Middle Ring Road 1 Sprint Expressway Damansara; Bangsar; FT 2 Petaling Jaya; FT 2 Shah Alam; FT 2 Klang; North–South Expressway Southern Route AH2 Seremban; North–South Expressway Southern Route AH2 Melaka; North–South Expressway Southern Route AH2 Johor Bahru	Interchange; Start/End of flyover
Lebuhraya Mahameru
Sentul Link
		Sentul Link flyover Railway crossing bridge		
		Sentul Link flyover Sungai Batu bridge		
		Sentul Link flyover		
		Sentul Link flyover		Start/End of flyover
		Sentul; Jalan Sentul	Jalan Sentul North; Sentul; East Coast Expressway FT 2 AH141 Kuantan South; Jalan Ipoh; Kuala Lumpur city centre	Junctions
Sentul Link; Start/End of highway
		Sentul; Sentul Timur	North; Jalan 2/4A; Sentul flats Sentul Timur LRT station Bandar Baru Sentul; Titiwangsa Lake; Eye on Malaysia; Setapak; FT 68 Gombak	T-junctions; Start/End of highway
