= Kentonmen MRT station =

Metro station in Kuala Lumpur, Malaysia

PY14 Kentonmen
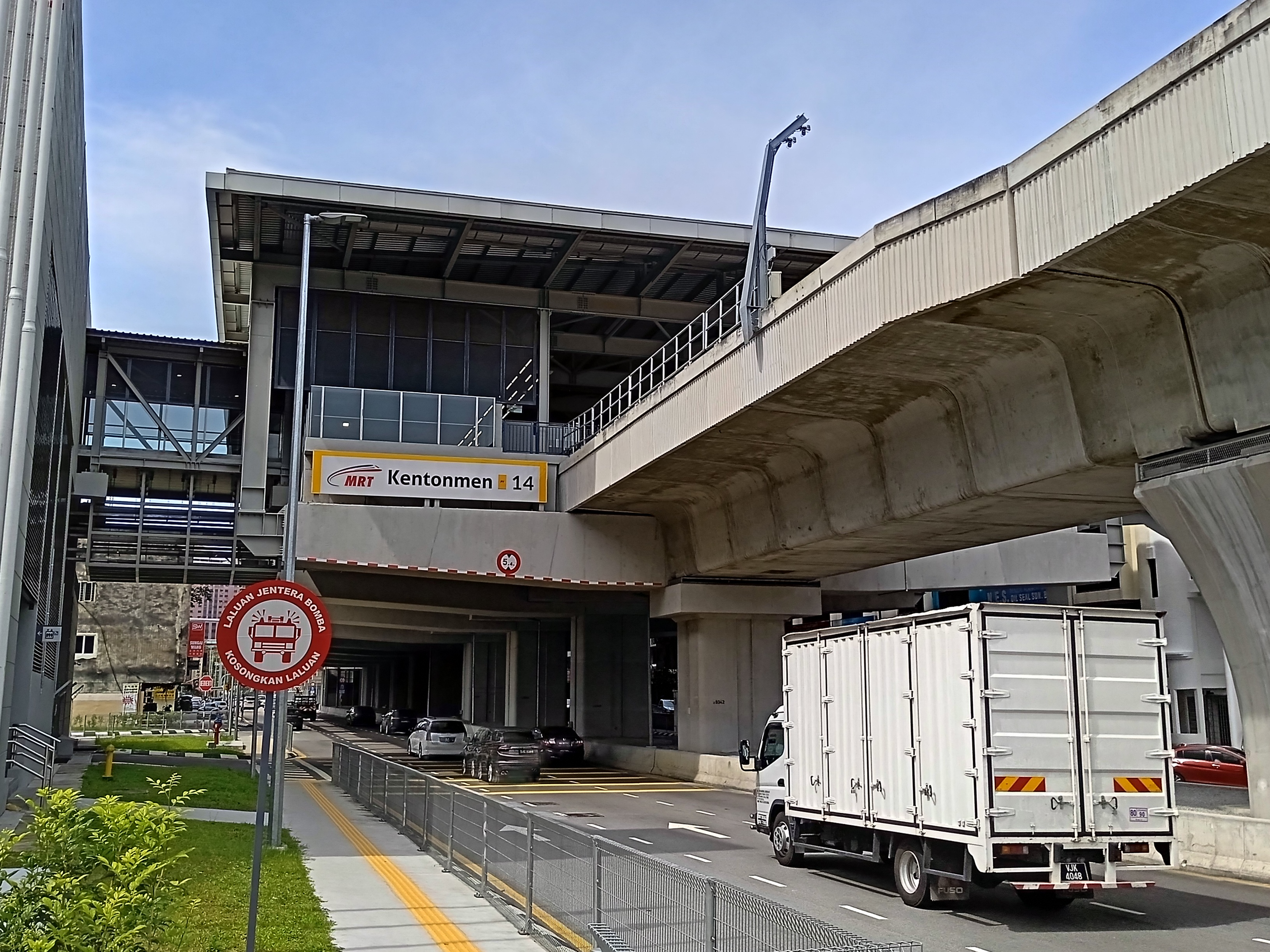

General information
- Other names: Malay: كينتونمن (Jawi); Chinese: 肯都门; Tamil: கெண்டொன்மன்
- Location: Jalan Sultan Azlan Shah, Batu; 51100 Kuala Lumpur; Malaysia
- Coordinates: 3°11′43.6″N 101°40′46.6″E
- System: Rapid KL
- Owner: MRT Corp
- Operator: Rapid Rail
- Line: 12 Putrajaya Line
- Platforms: 2 side platforms
- Tracks: 2

Construction
- Structure type: Elevated
- Parking: Available (Park & Ride)
- Accessible: Yes

Other information
- Status: Operational
- Station code: PY14

History
- Opened: 16 March 2023; 3 years ago

Services
Preceding station		Following station
Kampung Batu towards Kwasa Damansara	Putrajaya Line	Jalan Ipoh towards Putrajaya Sentral
Location

The Kentonmen MRT station is a mass rapid transit (MRT) station serving the suburbs of Taman Bamboo, Taman Eastern, Taman Kok Lian, Taman Impian and Taman Rainbow in Batu, Kuala Lumpur, Malaysia.

It is one of the stations being built as part of the Klang Valley Mass Rapid Transit (KVMRT) project on the MRT Putrajaya Line. The station is located on Jalan Sultan Azlan Shah as well as being named after the Batu Cantonment Army Camp, or Kem Batu Kentonmen in Malay.

== Station details ==
=== Station design ===
The station's design is unique among other stations on the Putrajaya Line as it consists one of an elevated platform level with 2 separate ticketing concourses and faregates for each of its side platforms. Each concourse is connected to either one of the station's entrances. The station was built as such due to the lack of space in the area to build a station with island platforms. The platforms, however, are linked via a walkway and bridge crossing over the railway tracks and are connected to the platforms via lifts, escalators and stairways.

=== Location ===
The station is strategically located near landmarks such as Bamboo Hills and the Cantonment Exchange Complex.

Nearby neighborhoods covered by this station:

- Taman Bamboo
- Taman Eastern
- Taman Impian
- Taman Kok Lian
- Taman Rainbow

Nearby high-rise buildings covered by this station:

- Pelangi Indah Condominium
- Sri Intan 1 Condominium
- Sri Intan 2 Condominium
- Seri Gembira Apartment
- Desa Alpha Condominium
- Seri Anggun Condominium
- Villa Angsana Condominium

Bamboo Hills commercial area

The station is a 800m walking distance to the Bamboo Hills commercial area from Entrance B, which takes about 13 minutes. However, there is no dedicated pedestrian walkway, and passengers are required to cross the busy Duta–Ulu Klang Expressway (DUKE).

=== Connection with KTM Komuter ===
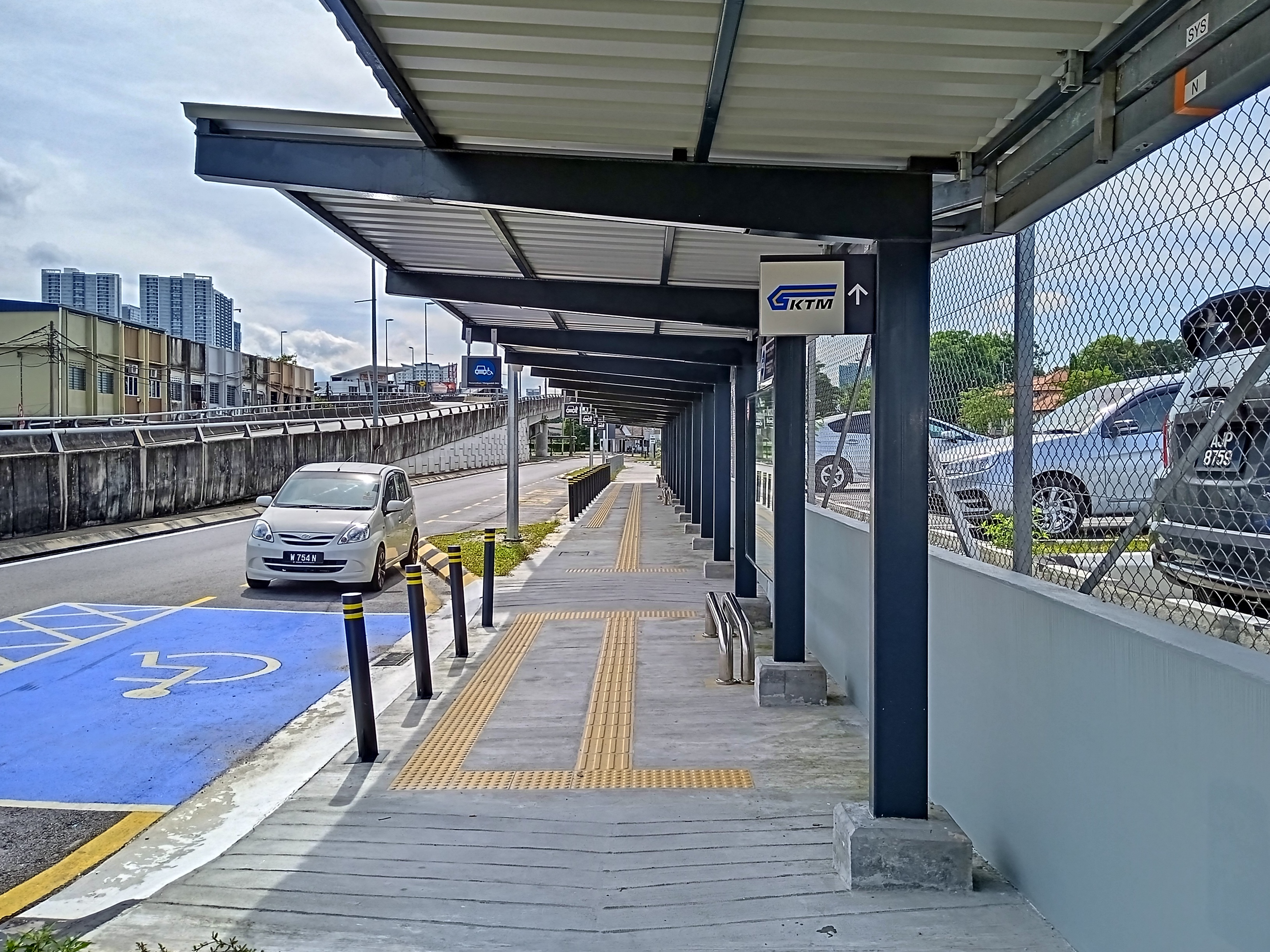
Linkway to KTM Komuter station

The station is within walking distance to, but not integrated with the Batu Kentonmen Komuter station station on KTM Komuter's Batu Caves–Pulau Sebang Line.

=== Exits and entrances ===
The station has a total of 2 entrances. Entrance A is located near to Taman Rainbow and Taman Eastern while Entrance B is placed near to Taman Bamboo. The feeder bus serves at the feeder bus stop located at Entrance A.

In the future, a link bridge to the Bamboo Hills development will be built along with the construction of Bamboo Hills Residences. The bridge will connect with the concourse level where Entrance B is located.

Putrajaya Line station
Entrance	Location	Destination	Picture
A	Jalan Batu Kentonmen	Park and Ride, feeder bus stop, Taxi and E-hailing Layby, Jalan Ipoh (east side), Cantonment Exchange Complex, Kem Batu Kentonmen, KTM Batu Kentonmen, Taman Rainbow, Taman Eastern, Taman Impian, Desa Alpha and Seri Anggun Condominium	
B	Jalan Cenderuh 2	Bus stop, Jalan Ipoh (west side), Jalan Cenderuh, Taman Bamboo, Pelangi Indah, Sri Intan 2 and Sri Intan 1 Condominiums	

=== Bus service ===
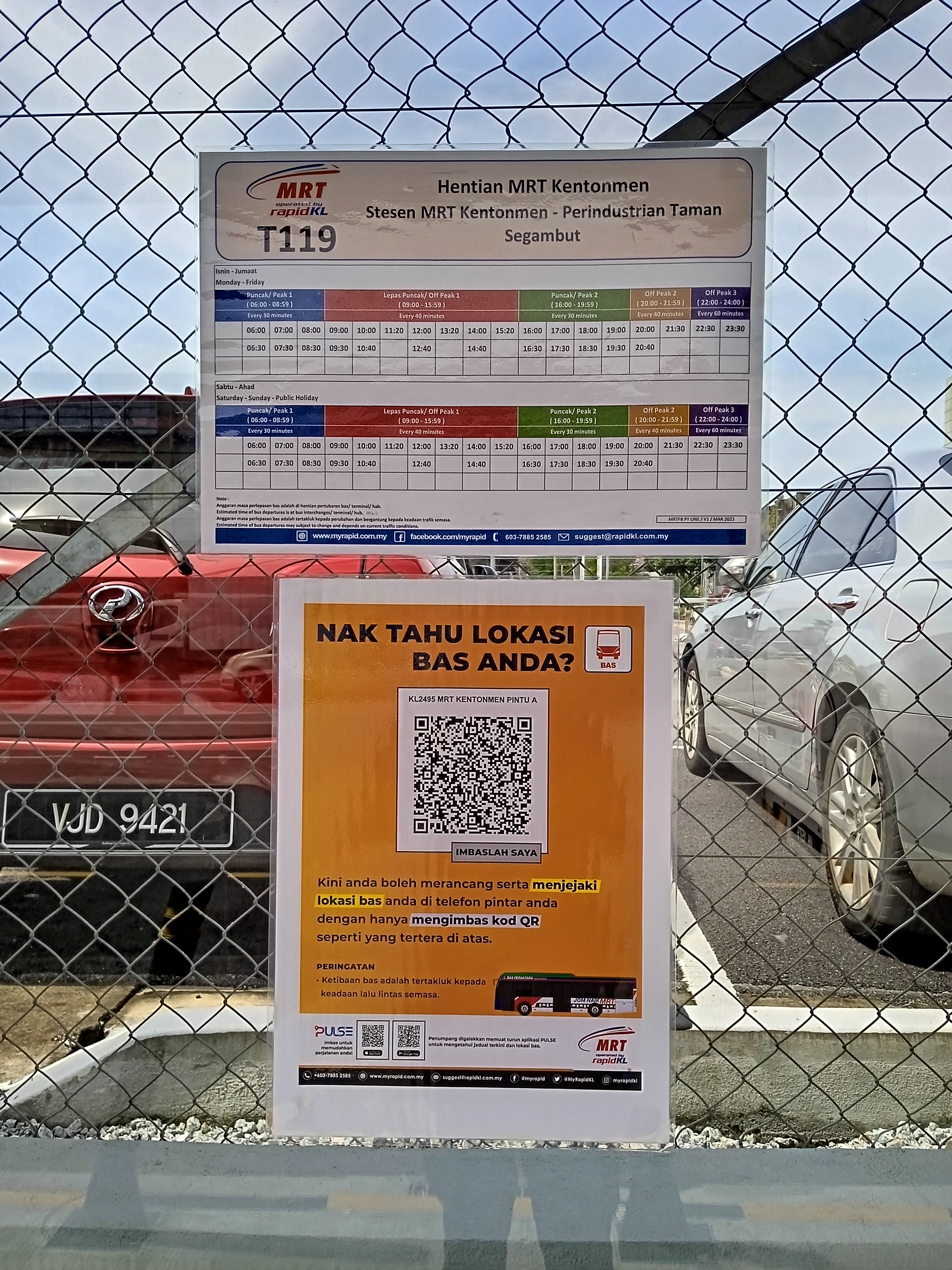
T119 bus departure schedule

Bus service is located at Entrance A of the station, near Jalan Batu Kentonmen and Entrance B of the station, near Jalan Ipoh.

- Rapid Bus (MRT Feeder Bus):
  - T119 (Terminated) (MRT Kentonmen–Perindustrian Taman Segambut)
- Rapid Bus (Local bus):
  - 173 (Taman Jasa Utama–Hab Medan Pasar via MRT Kentonmen)
- Selangor Omnibus:
  - 103 (Hab Lebuh Pudu–Damansara Damai via MRT Kentonmen)
  - 104 (Hab Lebuh Pudu–Wangsa Permai via MRT Kentonmen)
  - 107 (Hab Lebuh Pudu–Bestari Jaya via MRT Kentonmen)
  - 120 (Hab Lebuh Pudu–Jinjang Utara via MRT Kentonmen)

== Gallery ==
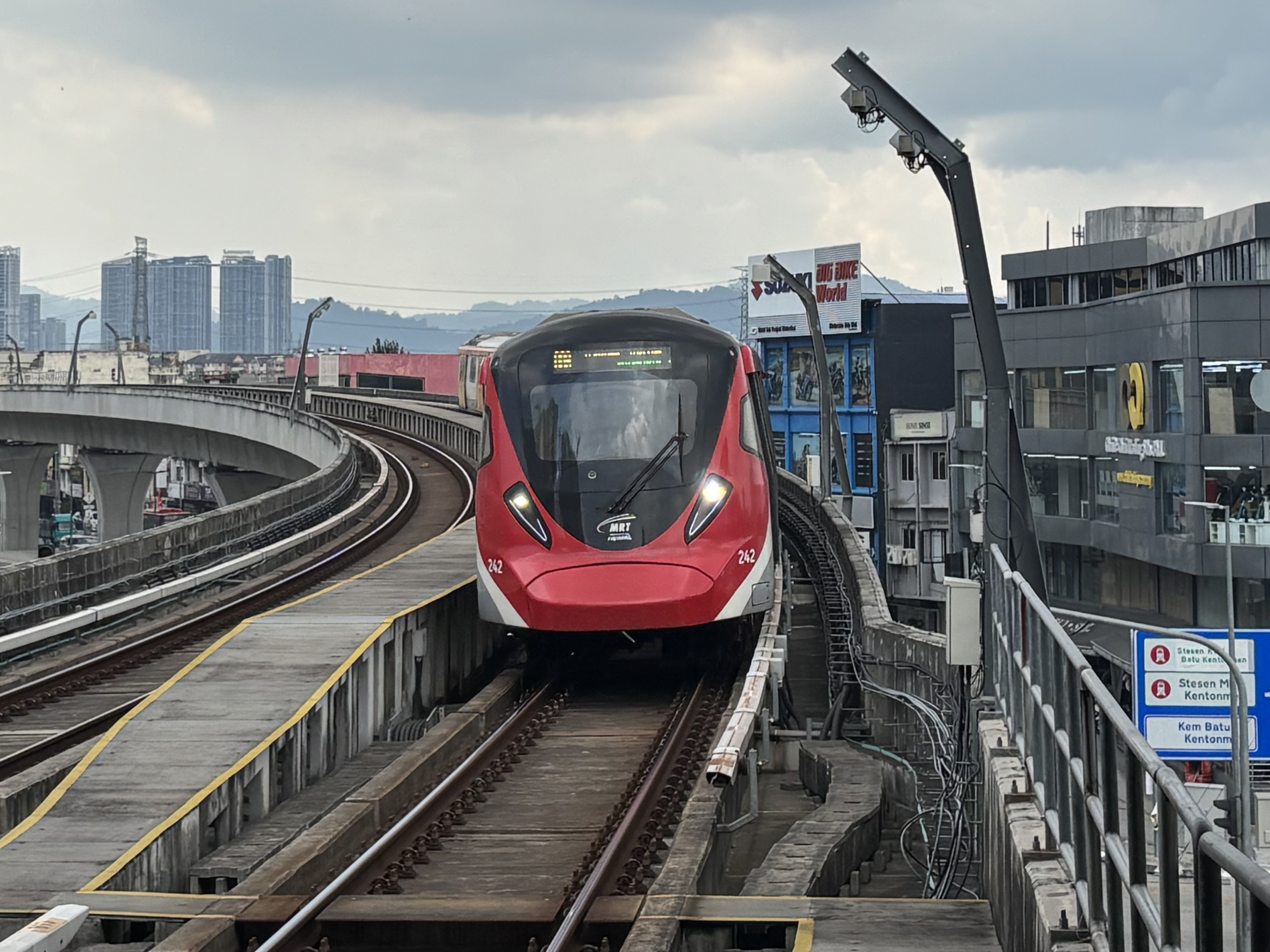
Hyundai Rotem 4-car trainset approaching Kentonmen MRT Station bound for Putrajaya Sentral

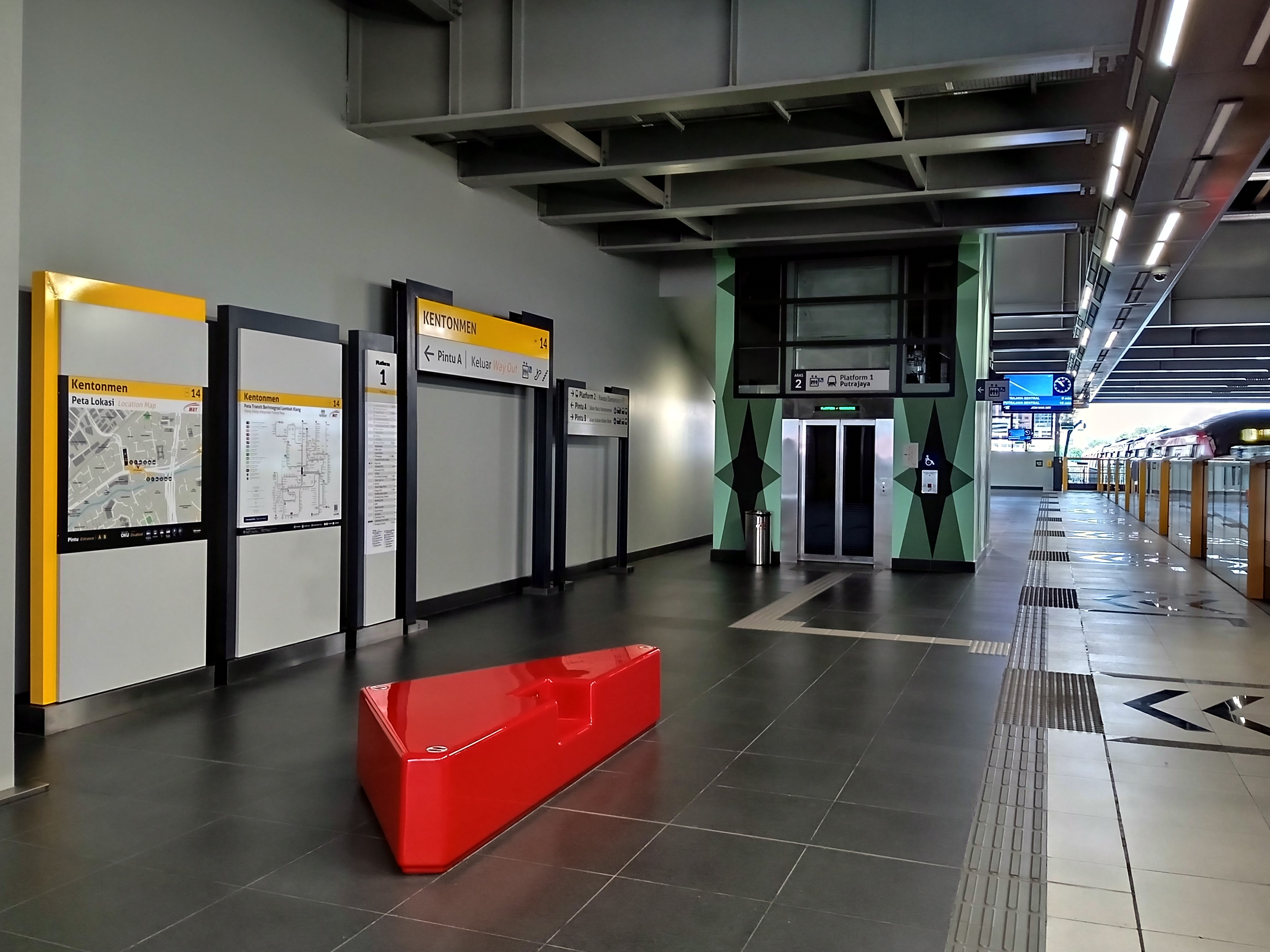
Platform 1 to Putrajaya Sentral

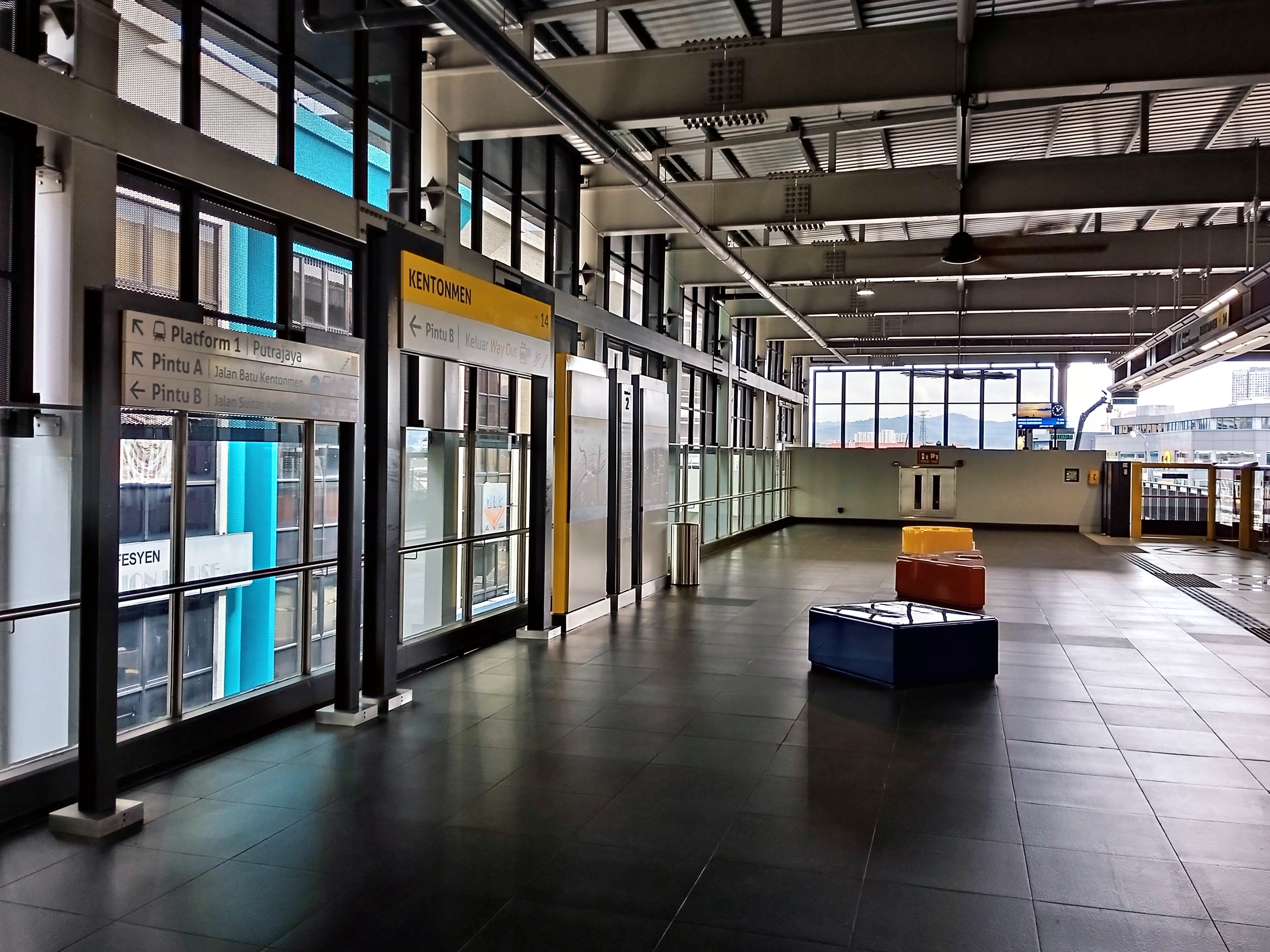
Platform 2 to Kwasa Damansara

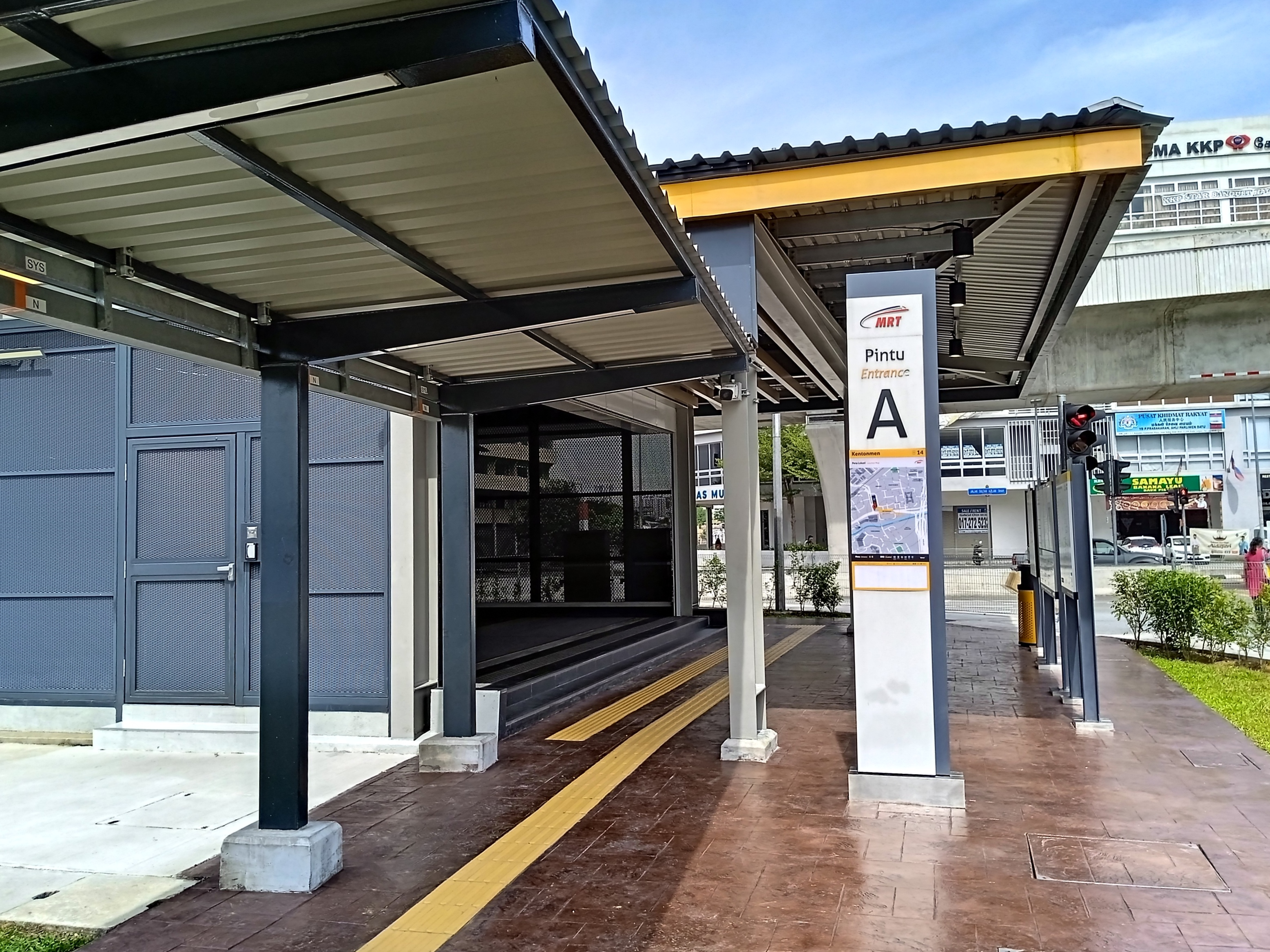
Entrance A to Jalan Batu Kentonmen

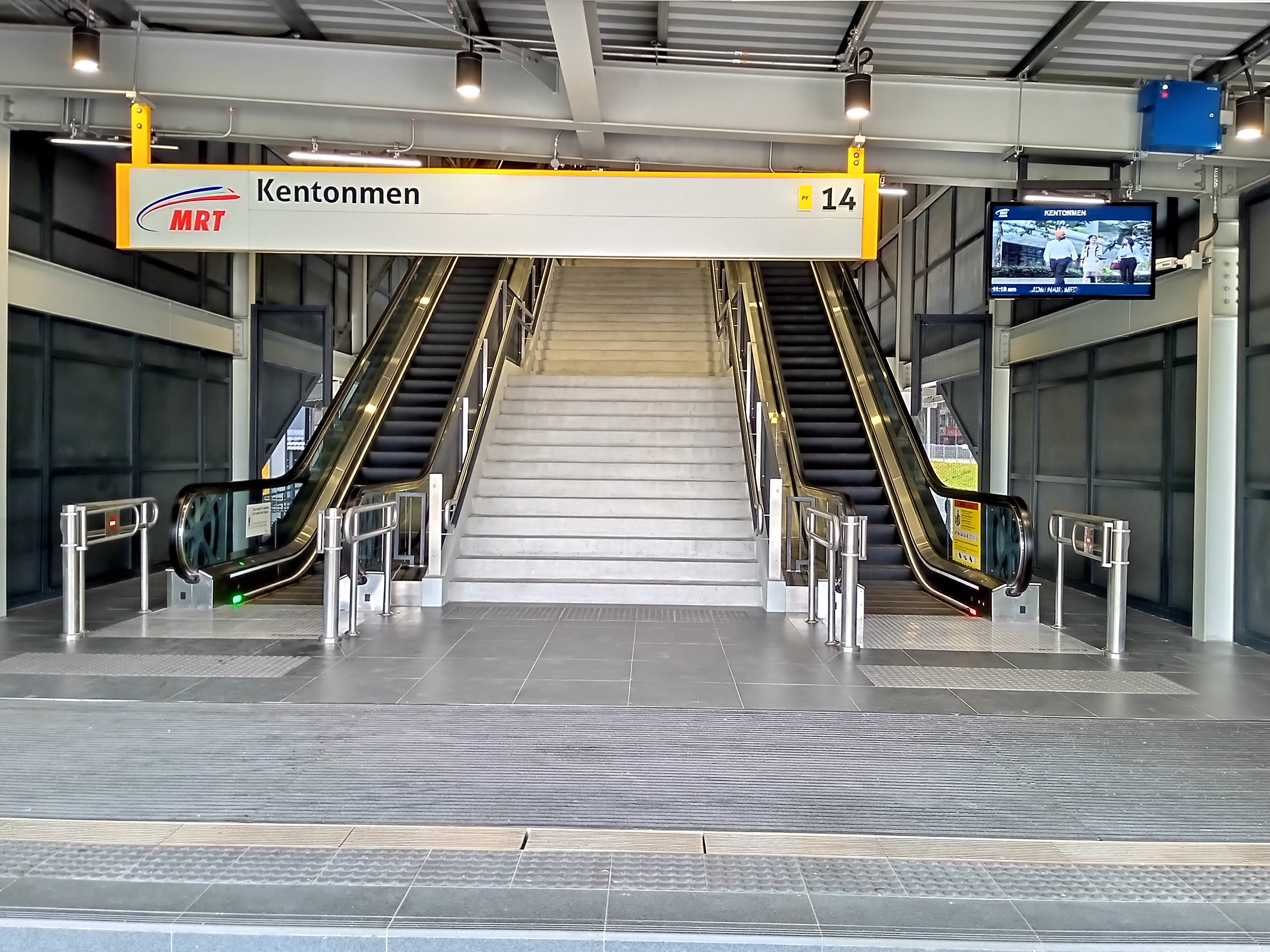
Entrance B to Jalan Sultan Azlan Shah

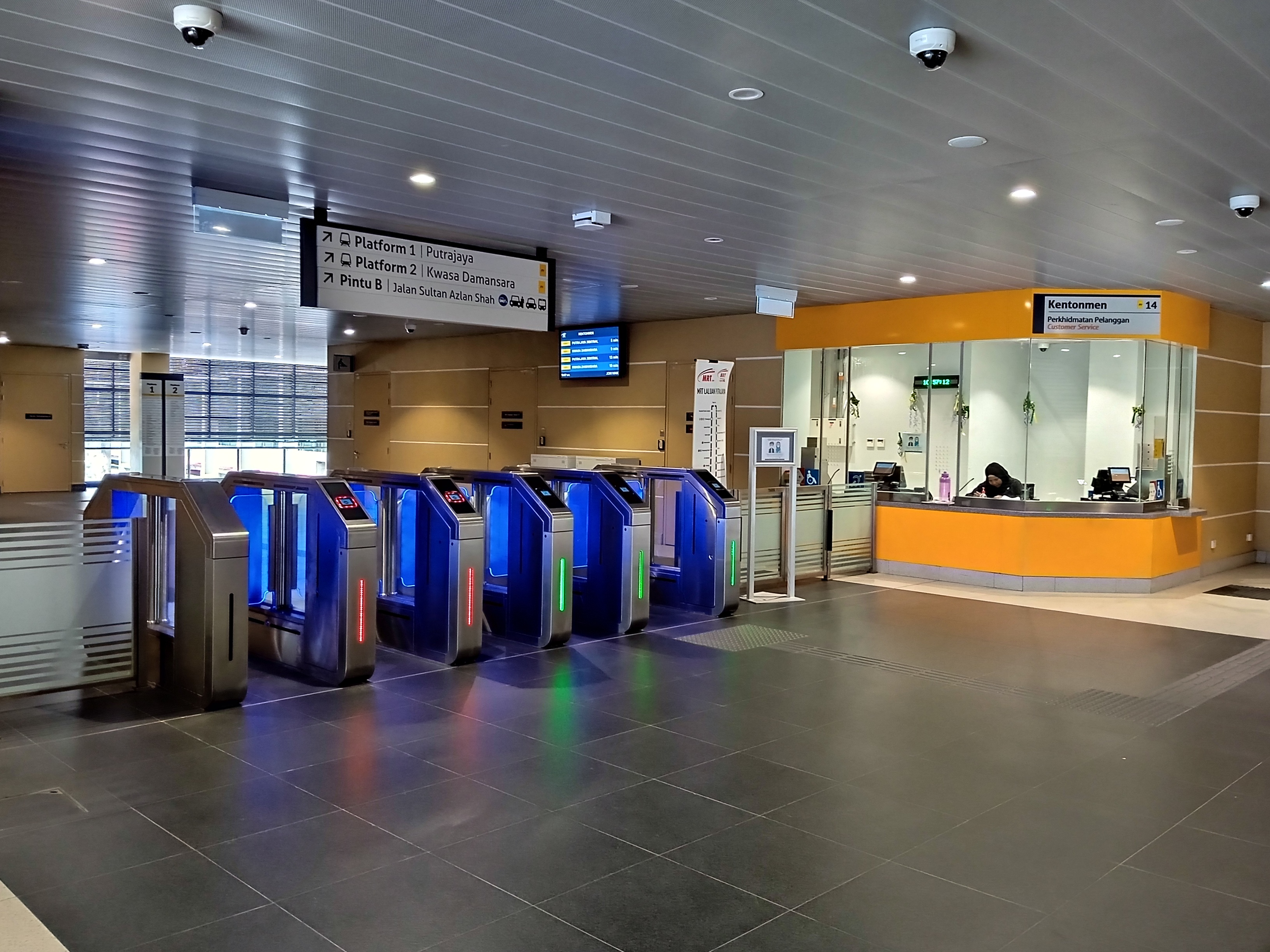
North concourse of the station to Entrance A

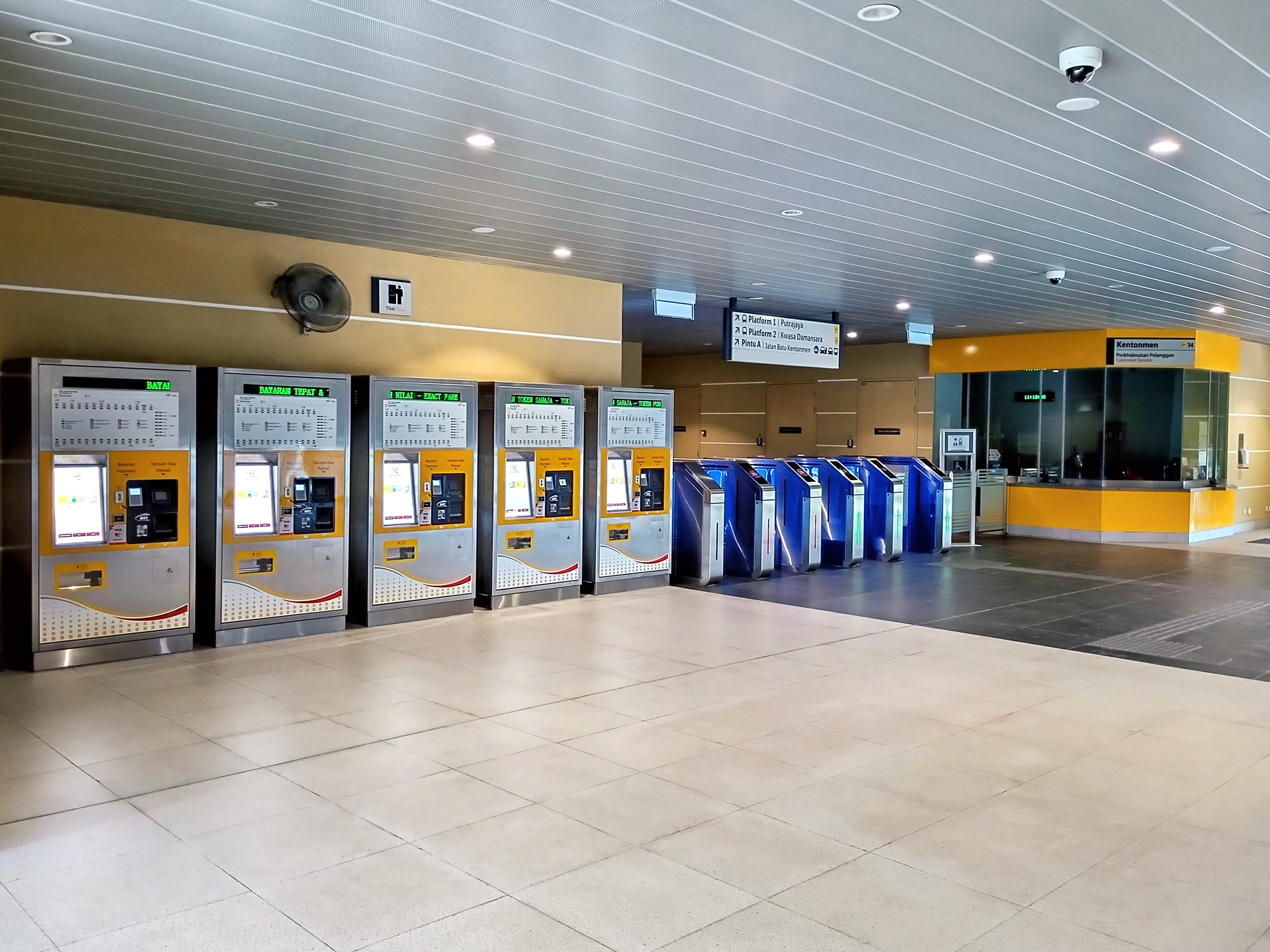
South concourse of the station to Entrance B

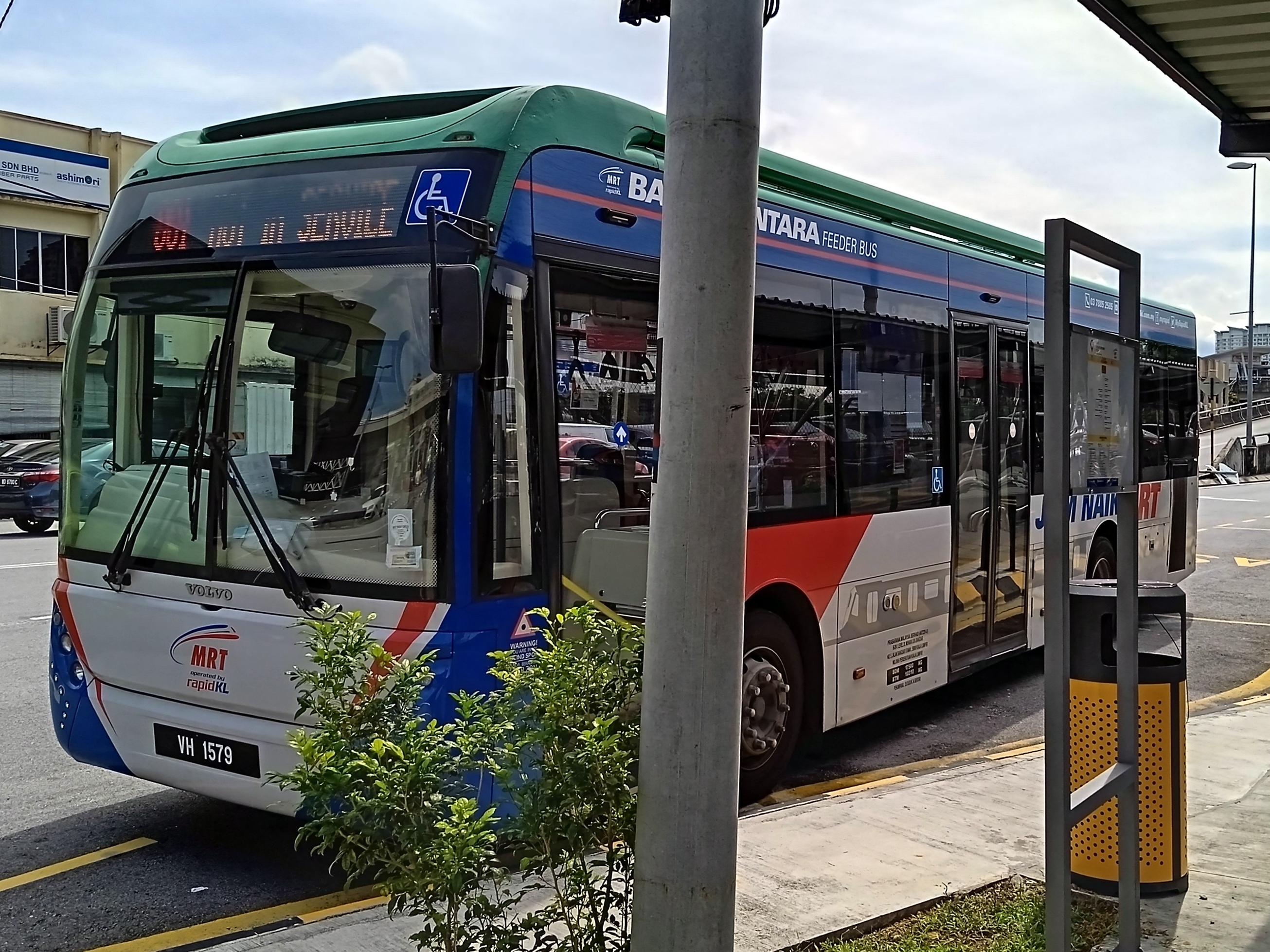
T119 bus at Entrance A

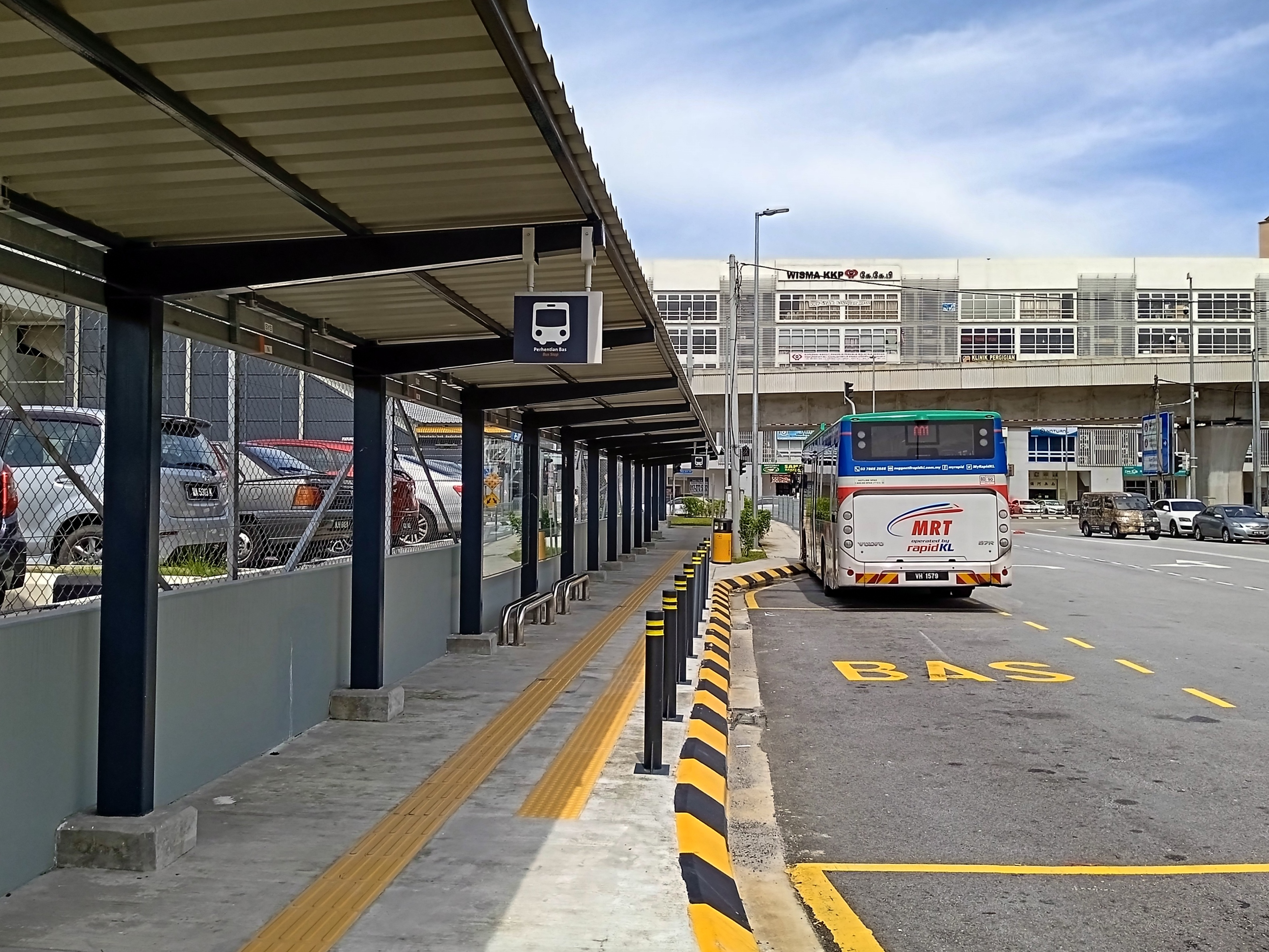
Entrance A bus stops at Jalan Batu Kentonmen

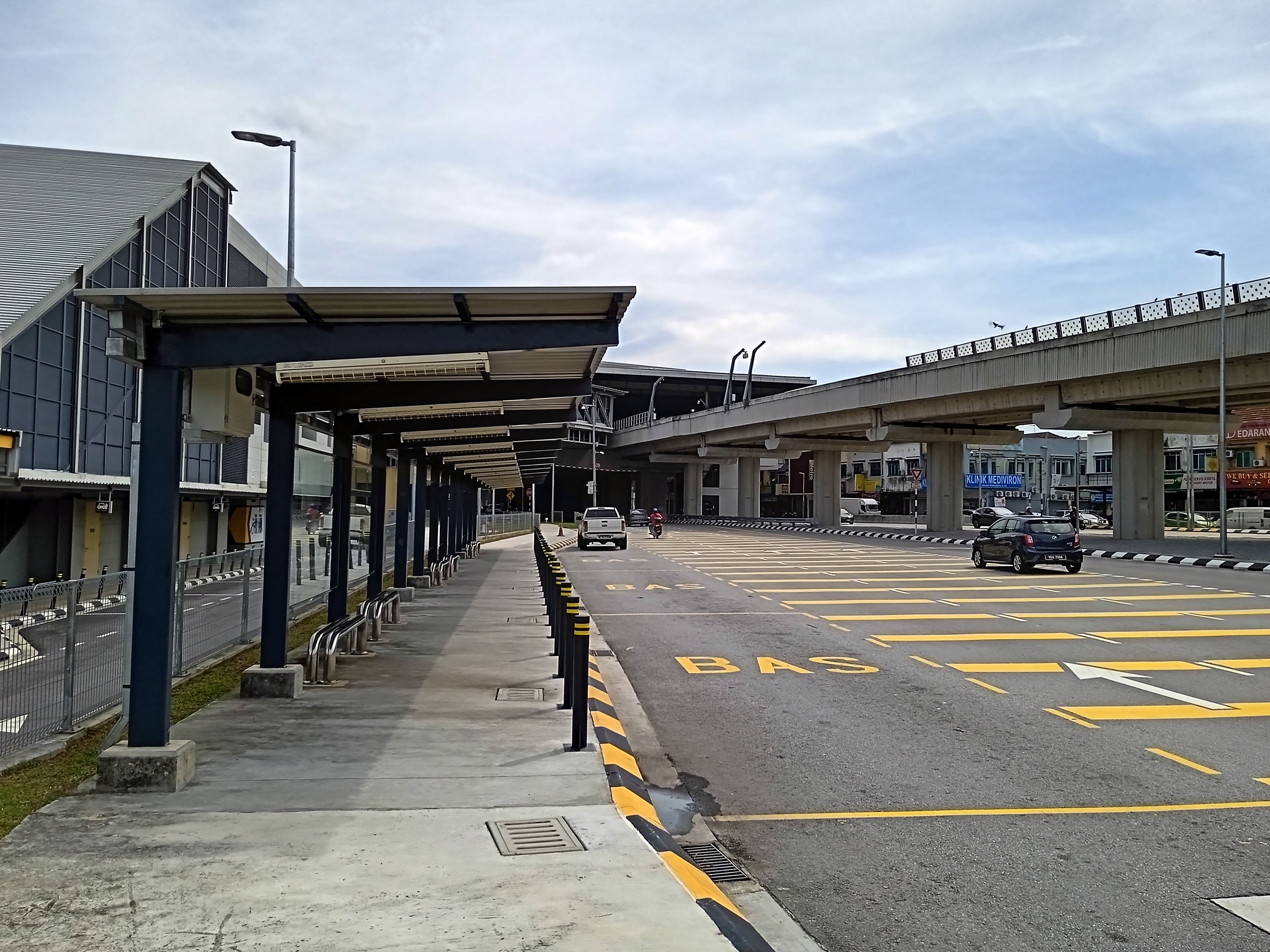
Entrance B bus stop at Jalan Ipoh

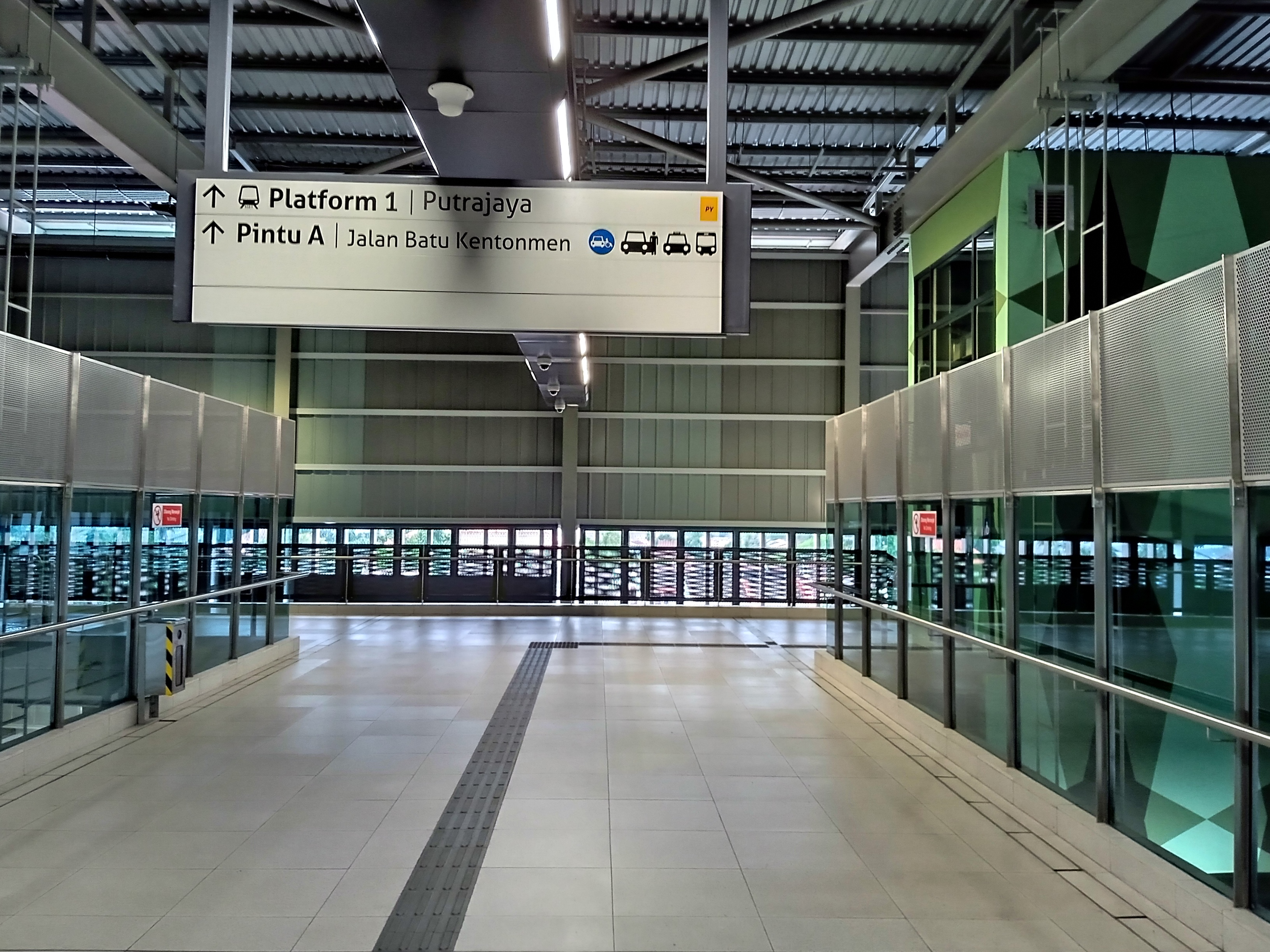
Platform 1 and 2 linkway
