= Kampung Kasipillay =

Coordinates: 3.176°N 101.677°E

Kampung Kasipillay is a small village in Kuala Lumpur, Malaysia. It is located between Segambut and Sentul.
