= Batu Caves Komuter station =

Railway station in Gombak, Selangor, Malaysia

Batu Caves

General information
- Other names: Malay: باتو کيۏس (Jawi); Chinese: 峇都喼; Tamil: பத்து மலை
- Location: Batu Caves, Gombak District; Selangor; Malaysia
- Coordinates: 3°14′16.1″N 101°40′52.2″E
- System: KC05 | Commuter rail station
- Owner: Railway Assets Corporation
- Operator: Keretapi Tanah Melayu
- Line: Batu Caves branch
- Platforms: 2 side platforms
- Tracks: 4

Construction
- Parking: Available with payment
- Accessible: Yes

Other information
- Station code: KC05

History
- Opened: 1905
- Rebuilt: April 2010
- Electrified: April 2010

Services
Preceding station	Keretapi Tanah Melayu (Komuter)	Following station
Terminus	Batu Caves–Pulau Sebang Line	Taman Wahyu towards Pulau Sebang/Tampin
Location

The Batu Caves Komuter station is a Malaysian commuter rail train station at Batu Caves, Gombak District, Selangor. After redevelopment, the station was reopened in August 2010. The station was from 2010 the northern terminus for the KTM Komuter's Port Klang Line (Batu Caves–Port Klang Route) until December 2015 when the Seremban Line (later named Batu Caves-Pulau Sebang Line) routing was changed to terminate at this station instead of Rawang.

== History ==
The Batu Caves railway station was constructed on 1 November 1905. Over the years, the station fell into a poor condition through neglect and lack of use. The line between Sentul and Batu Caves was not included in the double-tracking and electrification of the line between Kuala Lumpur and Sentul under the Sixth Malaysia Plan (1990–1995). Since then, the station has been rebuilt and the line electrified. The existing single railway track between Sentul to Batu Caves was doubled, and new stations were built, including Taman Wahyu, Kampung Batu, and Batu Kentonmen. This project was scheduled to start before 2001, with DRB-Hicom Berhad as a contractor. The letter of intent was issued by the Transport Ministry to the company on 13 April 2001. However, no letter of award was issued and there was no progress until 17 November 2006 when site possession was given to contractor YTL Corporation. The project was expected to be completed by April 2010, but the new station was opened in August 2010.

== Around the station ==
- Batu Caves

== See also ==
- Rail transport in Malaysia
