= Sentul Barat MRT station =

Metro station in Kuala Lumpur, Malaysia

PY16 Sentul Barat
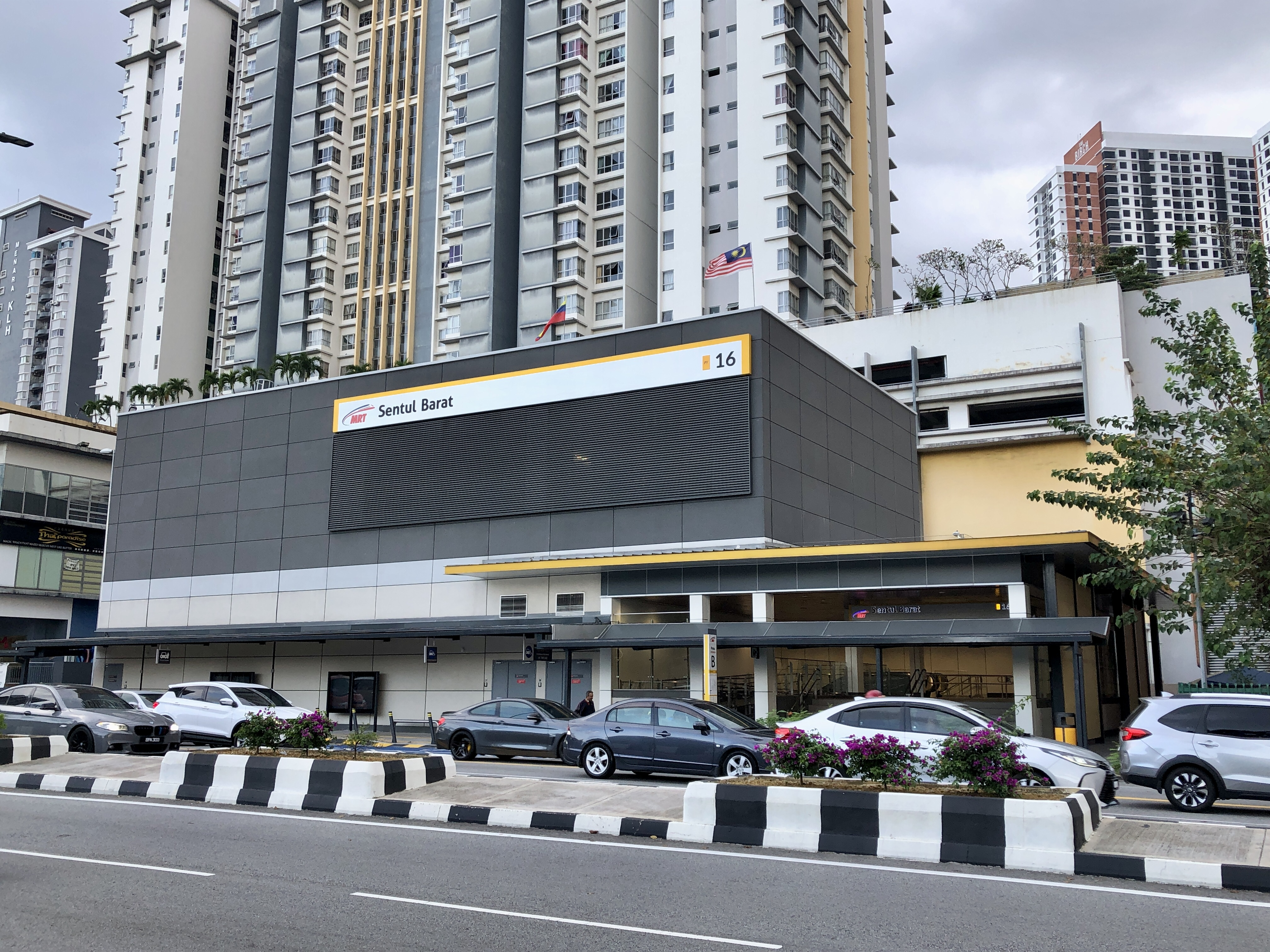
- Exterior of Entrance B along Jalan Sultan Azlan Shah (Jalan Ipoh)

General information
- Other names: Malay: سنتول بارت (Jawi); Chinese: 冼都西; Tamil: செந்தூல் பாராட்
- Location: Jalan Sultan Azlan Shah, Sentul; 51100 Kuala Lumpur; Malaysia
- System: Rapid KL
- Owner: MRT Corp
- Operator: Rapid Rail
- Line: 12 Putrajaya Line
- Platforms: 1 island platform
- Tracks: 2

Construction
- Structure type: Underground
- Depth: 29.8 metres (98 ft)
- Parking: Unavailable
- Accessible: Yes

Other information
- Status: Operational
- Station code: PY16

History
- Opened: 16 March 2023; 3 years ago

Services
Preceding station		Following station
Jalan Ipoh towards Kwasa Damansara	Putrajaya Line	Titiwangsa towards Putrajaya Sentral
Location

The Sentul Barat MRT station is a mass rapid transit (MRT) underground station that serves the suburb of Sentul in northern-central Kuala Lumpur, Malaysia. It is part of the MRT Putrajaya Line.

== Station details ==
The station's theme embodies the concept of "presenting the rustic", portraying a design that is characterised by its natural, organic, and slightly weathered appearance, reflecting the charm of rural areas. The chosen colour palette for the theme is "oxide red", drawing inspiration from Sentul, a district that once housed the largest train depot in the country, known as the Sentul Depot. This depot has since been transformed into Sentul Park and the Kuala Lumpur Performing Arts Centre (KLPAC).

=== Location ===
The station is located along Jalan Sultan Azlan Shah (formerly known as Jalan Ipoh).

=== Exits and entrances ===
The station consists of 2 entrances. Entrance B is located on the west side of Jalan Sultan Azlan Shah serving Kampung Kasipillay, while Entrance C is located on the east side of Jalan Sultan Azlan Shah serving the Sentul West and Taman Million neighborhoods. Entrance A has not been built, and is reserved for future developments.

Putrajaya Line station
Entrance	Location	Destination	Picture
B	Jalan Sultan Azlan Shah (Kepong bound)	Bus stop, Taxi and E-hailing Layby, Jalan Kasipillay, Jalan Selvadurai, Kampung Kasipillay, Riverwalk Village, Rivercity Condominium, Putra Majestik, The Birch and Court 28 Residences	
C	Jalan Sultan Azlan Shah (KL bound)	Feeder bus stop, Taxi and E-hailing Layby, Jalan Gagak, Jalan Strachan, Sentul West, Taman Million, Kuala Lumpur Performing Arts Centre (KLPAC), Sentul Depot, Rica Residence Sentul and Sentul Komuter station.	

== Planned interchange ==
The station was previously planned to be an interchange station with the future MRT Circle Line the line's old alignment.

== Bus service ==
=== Feeder bus ===
Route number	Origin	Destination	Via	Interchange	Image
T180	KL607 PY16 Sentul Barat (Entrance C)	Taman Dato Senu/Bandar Baru Sentul	Jalan Sultan Azlan Shah; Sentul Link; Jalan Enam; Jalan 2/48A; AG1 SP1 Sentul Timur; Jalan 1/48A; Jalan Dato Senu 11; Jalan Dato Senu 4; Jalan Dato Senu 18; Jalan Dato Senu 26; Jalan Dato Senu 3; Jalan Dato Senu 5; Jalan Bahagia 2; AG2 SP2 Sentul	Rapid Bus: 151, 173, 180, 190; Selangor Bus: 100. 103, 104. 107, 120; MARA Liner: 150, 152	

=== Trunk bus ===
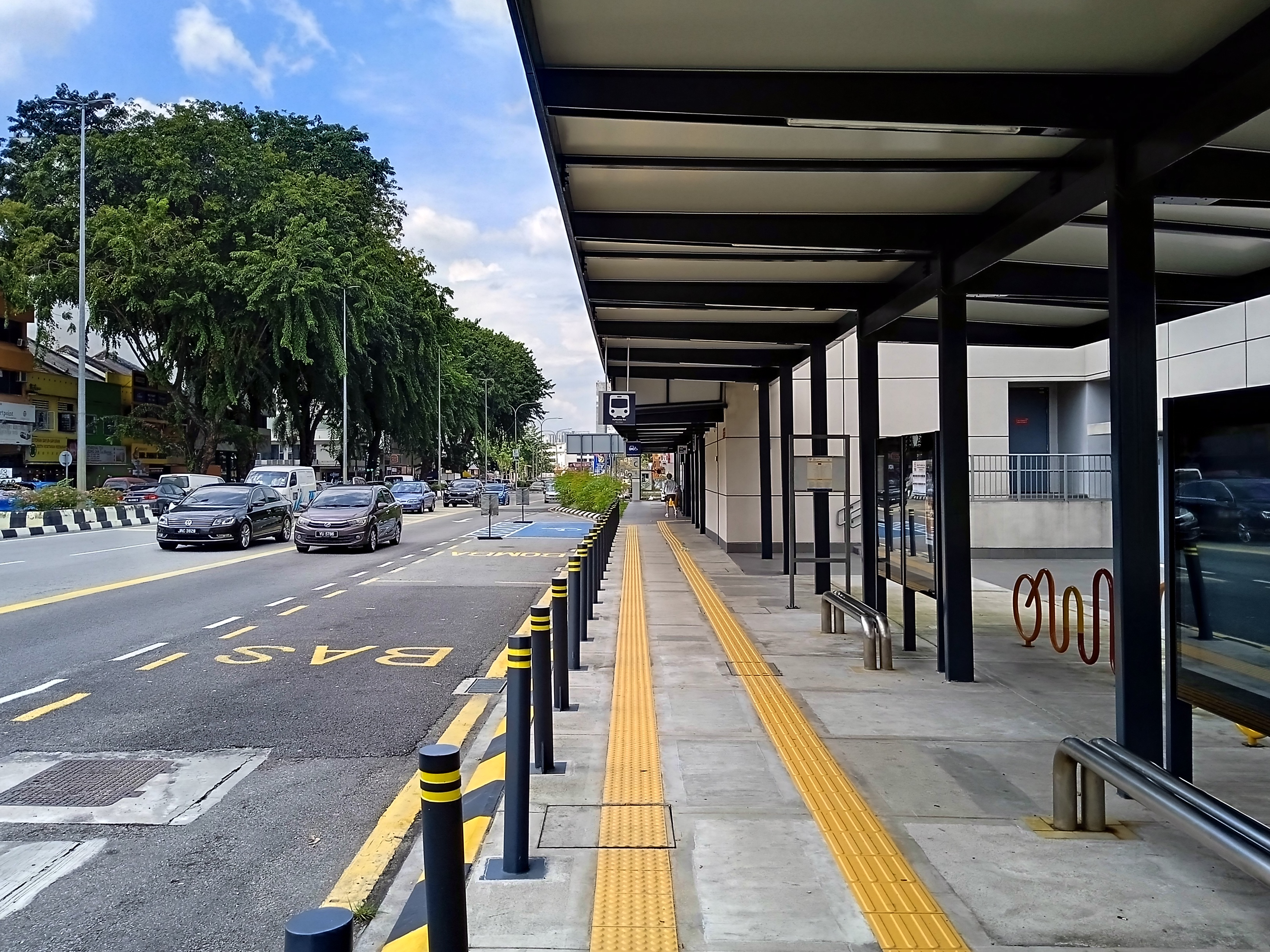
Bus stop at Entrance C of the station, 2023

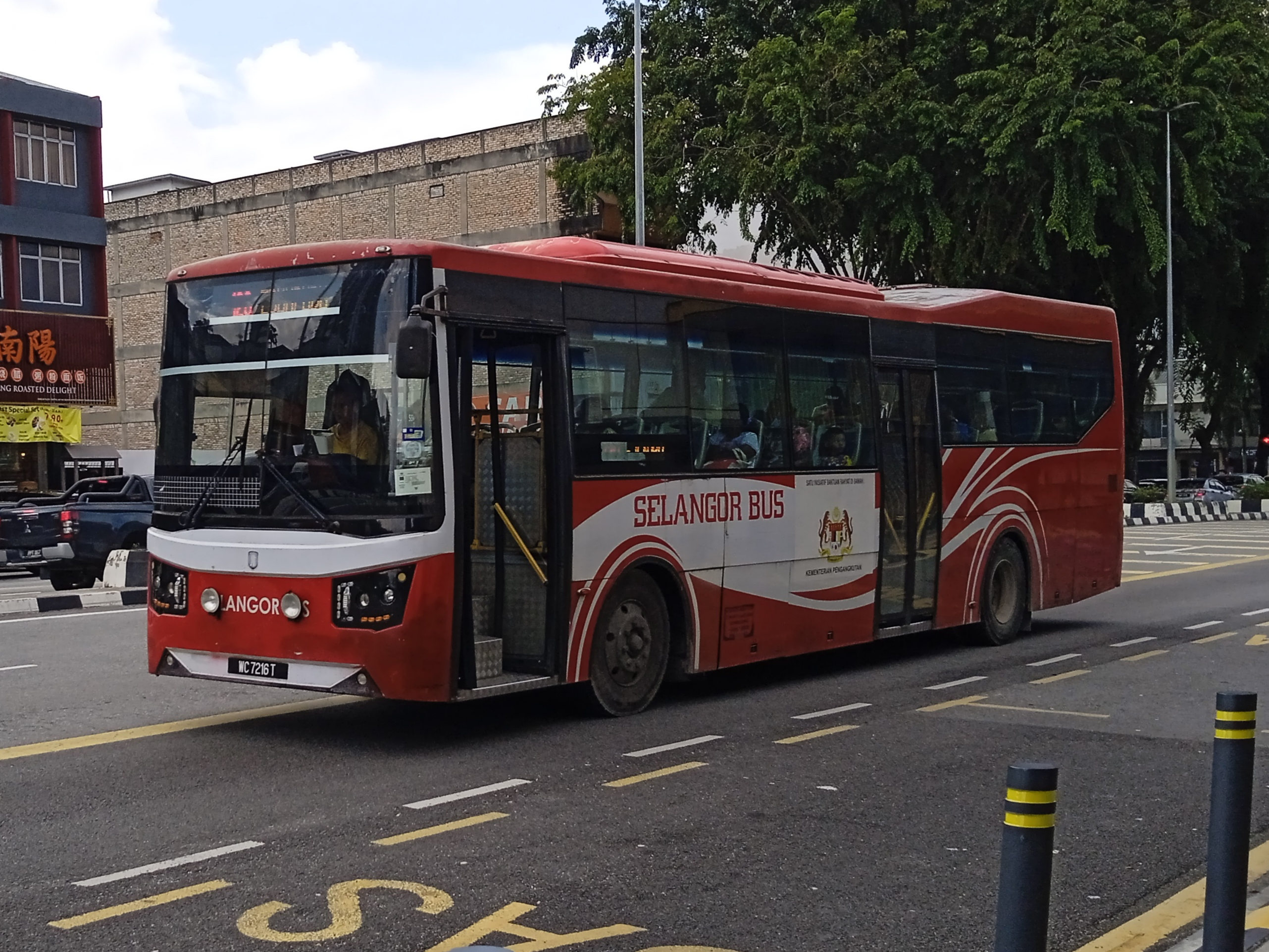
Selangor Omnibus bus route 120 at the Bus stop at Entrance C of the station, 2023

- Rapid Bus:
  - 151 (Bandar Baru Selayang–Hab Lebuh Pudu)
  - 173 (Taman Jasa Utama–Hab Medan Pasar)
  - 190 (Hab Desa Sri Hartamas–Hab Medan Pasar)
- Selangor Omnibus:
  - 101 (Hab Lebuh Pudu–Kuala Selangor)
  - 103 (Hab Lebuh Pudu–Damansara Damai)
  - 104 (Hab Lebuh Pudu–Wangsa Permai)
  - 107 (Hab Lebuh Pudu–Bestari Jaya)
  - 120 (Hab Lebuh Pudu–Jinjang Utara)
- MARA Liner:
  - 150 (Hab Lebuh Pudu–Terminal Bas Rawang)
  - 152 (Hab Lebuh Pudu–Bukit Idaman)
