= Batu Kentonmen Komuter station =

Railway station in Kuala Lumpur, Malaysia

Batu Kentonmen

General information
- Other names: Malay: باتو كينتونمن (Jawi); Chinese: 峇都肯都门; Tamil: பத்து கெண்டொன்மன்
- Location: Batu Kentonmen, Jalan Ipoh; Kuala Lumpur; Malaysia
- Coordinates: 3°11′53.1″N 101°40′52.2″E
- System: KC02 | Commuter rail station
- Owner: Railway Assets Corporation
- Operator: Keretapi Tanah Melayu
- Line: Batu Caves branch
- Platforms: 2 side platforms
- Tracks: 2

Construction
- Structure type: At-grade
- Parking: Available
- Accessible: Available

Other information
- Station code: KC02

History
- Opened: July 2010

Services
Preceding station	Keretapi Tanah Melayu (Komuter)	Following station
Kampung Batu towards Batu Caves	Batu Caves–Pulau Sebang Line	Sentul towards Pulau Sebang/Tampin
Location

Batu Kentonmen Komuter station is an at-grade Malaysian commuter railway train station located at the 4.5th miles of Jalan Ipoh, a major road and residential suburb of Kuala Lumpur. The station is named after the Batu Cantonment camp (Malay: Batu Kentomen), an army detention centre and army weapons depot located beside the station. The station is built as a feeder station for a number of residential neighbourhoods and is integrated with the adjacent military base, as sheltered walkways are built allowing military staff convenient use of the station. Slightly off-platform, a line from the main line branches of into the camp.

The station is designed to be disabled-friendly, with lifts to platforms and ramps to the ticketing office. Metal roofings fully cover the main platforms of the station.

== Connection to MRT Putrajaya Line ==
Batu Kentonmen Komuter station is within walking distance of, but not integrated with, the Kentonmen MRT station on the MRT Putrajaya Line.
