= Jalan Sultan Azlan Shah, Kuala Lumpur =

Road in Malaysia

Jalan Sultan Azlan Shah (Jalan Ipoh)
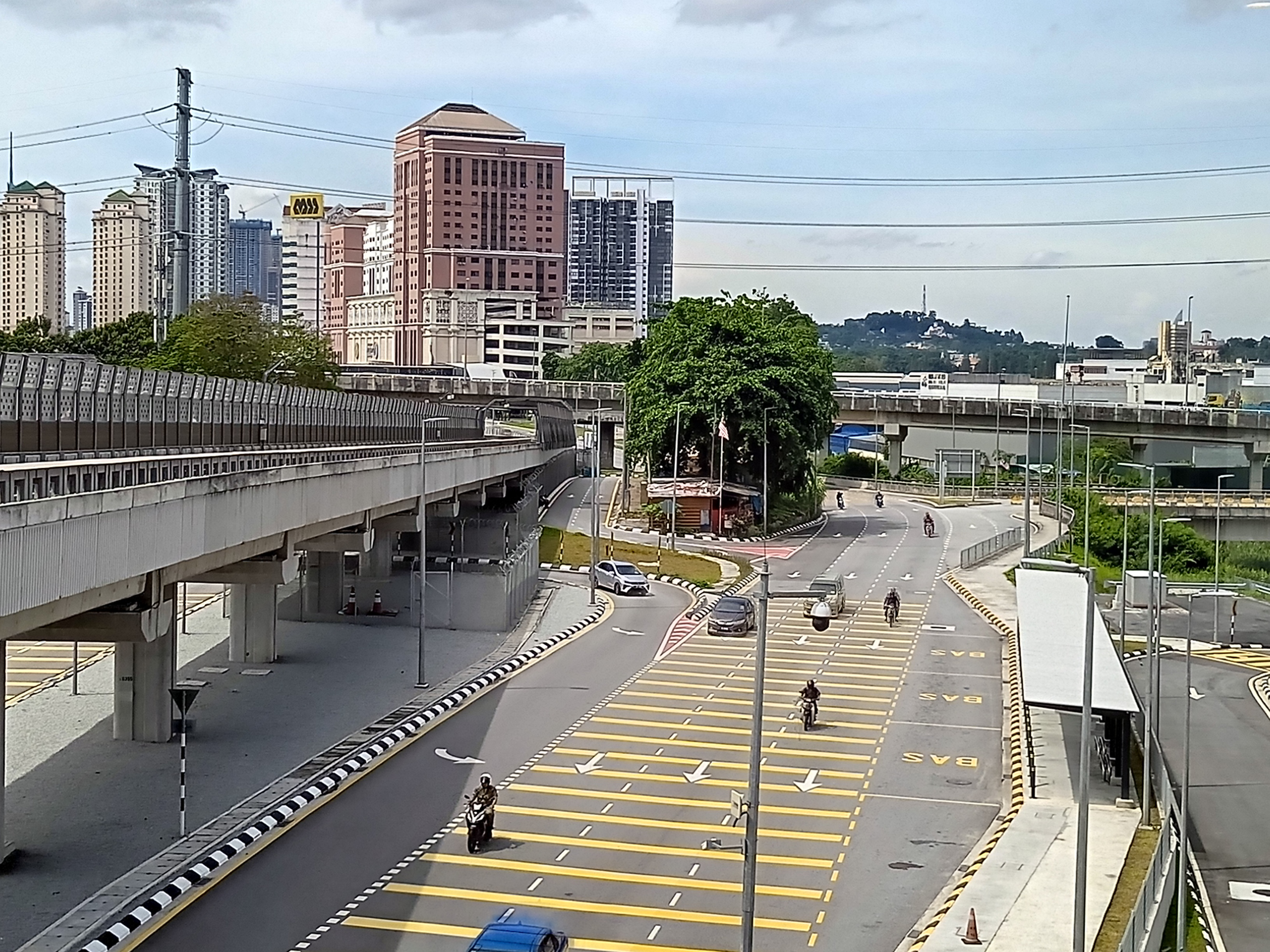

Major junctions
- North end: Jalan Ipoh
- Jalan Tuanku Abdul Halim (Jalan Duta); Jalan Sentul; Kuala Lumpur Middle Ring Road 1 FT 2 Genting Klang-Pahang Highway; Jalan Tuanku Abdul Rahman; Jalan Raja Muda Abdul Aziz
- Southeast end: Kuala Lumpur; Chow Kit

Location
- Country: Malaysia
- Primary destinations: Segambut; Sentul

Highway system
- Highways in Malaysia; Expressways; Federal; State

Jalan Sultan Azlan Shah is a major road in Kuala Lumpur, Malaysia. It was named after ninth Yang di-Pertuan Agong, Sultan Azlan Shah of Perak (1989 - 1994).

== History ==
It was previously named Jalan Ipoh as it was part of the national highway 1 system where motorists could connect to Ipoh and so forth.

In 2014 the Kuala Lumpur City Hall (DBKL) renamed the stretch from the Jalan Segambut junction to the Jalan Pahang junction of Jalan Ipoh to Jalan Sultan Azlan Shah.

Sultan Azlan Shah was the 34th Sultan of Perak, of which its former namesake Ipoh is the capital.

== List of junctions ==
km	Exit	Junctions	To	Remarks
				Start/End of separate carriageway
		Segambut	North; Jalan Ipoh; Kepong; Jinjang; Batu Caves West; Jalan Segambut; Segambut South; Jalan Tuanku Abdul Halim (Jalan Duta); Jalan Duta; Hentian Duta; North–South Expressway Northern Route AH141 New Klang Valley Expressway; Ipoh; Klang; Kuala Lumpur International Airport (KLIA); Johor Bahru	From north only
				Start/End of separate carriageway
		Taman Million		
		Kampung Kasipillay		
		Railway crossing bridge		
		Jalan Perhentian	Northeast; Jalan Perhentian; KTM Sentul Railway Depot; Sentul Komuter station	T-junctions
		Jalan Sentul	North; Jalan Sentul; Sentul; Batu; Gombak; East Coast Expressway FT 2 AH141 Kuantan	T-junctions
		KLMRR1	Kuala Lumpur Middle Ring Road 1 Jalan Tun Razak (Jalan Pekeliling) Southwest; Ipoh; Petaling Jaya East; KLCC; Ampang; North–South Expressway Southern Route AH2 Seremban; North–South Expressway Southern Route AH2 Melaka; North–South Expressway Southern Route AH2 Johor Bahru	Diamond interchange
		Jalan Raja Laut	Jalan Raja Laut	No entry
		Kuala Lumpur; Chow Kit	North; FT 2 Genting Klang-Pahang Highway; Jalan Pahang; Jalan Tun Razak (KLMRR 1); Setapak; Kuantan East; Jalan Raja Muda Abdul Aziz (Princes Road); Kampung Baru; Jalan Tun Razak (MRR1); Jalan Semarak South; Jalan Tuanku Abdul Rahman (Batu Road); Jalan Sultan Ismail (IRR); Jalan Dang Wangi; Dataran Merdeka	Junctions
