= Jalan Ipoh =

Road in Malaysia

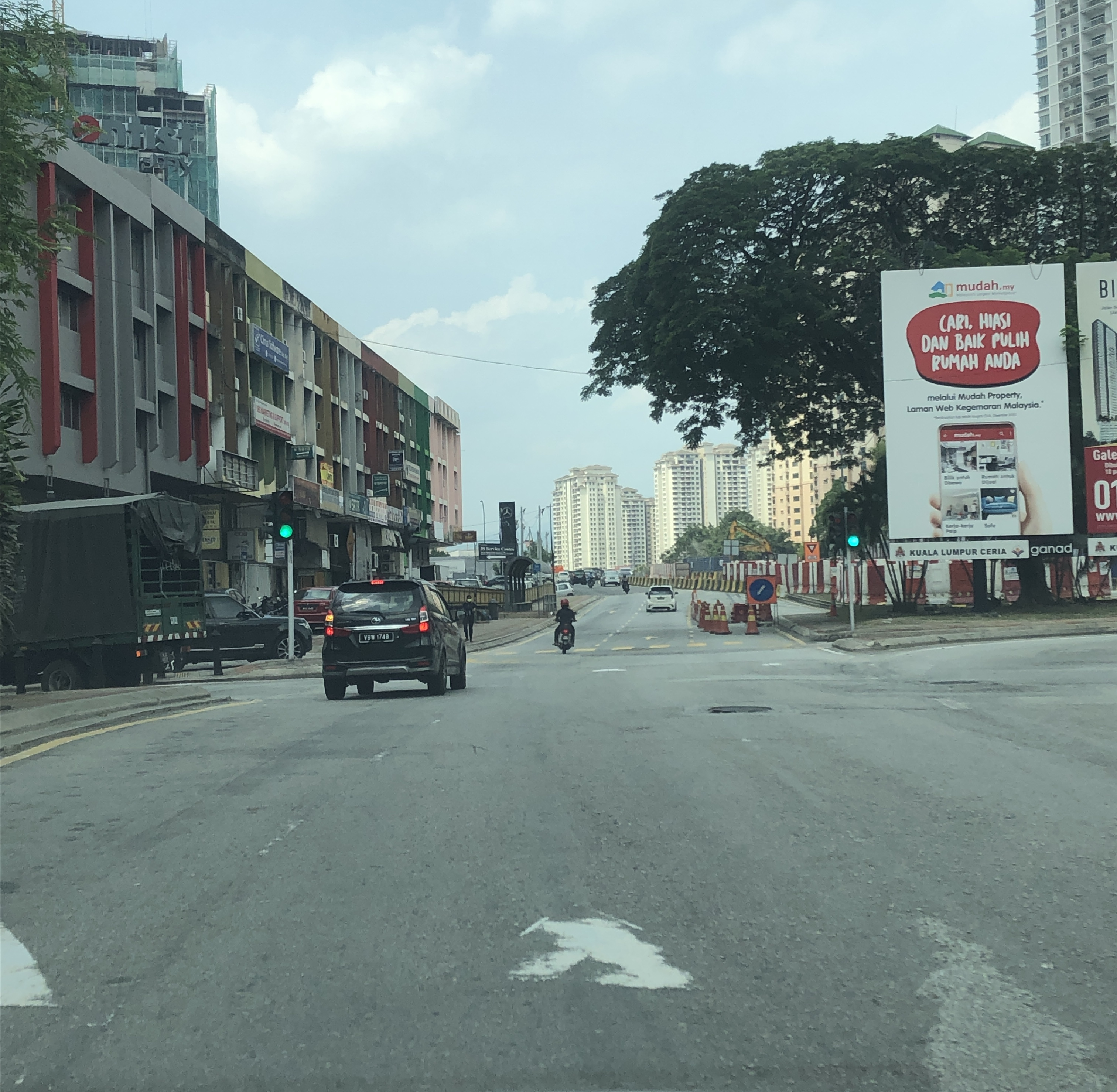
- Jalan Ipoh in October 2021

Route information
- Length: 0.95 km (0.59 mi; 3,100 ft)

Major junctions
- Northwest end: Kepong Roundabout
- FT 54 Federal Route 54; FT 1 Kuala Lumpur-Rawang Highway; Duta–Ulu Klang Expressway Duta–Ulu Klang Expressway (DUKE); Jalan Tuanku Abdul Halim (Jalan Duta)
- Southeast end: Jalan Sultan Azlan Shah

Location
- Country: Malaysia
- Primary destinations: Segambut; Sentul

Highway system
- Highways in Malaysia; Expressways; Federal; State

Jalan Ipoh is a major road in Kuala Lumpur, Malaysia. The road is named after the city of Ipoh in Perak. Its English name is called Ipoh Road.

== History ==
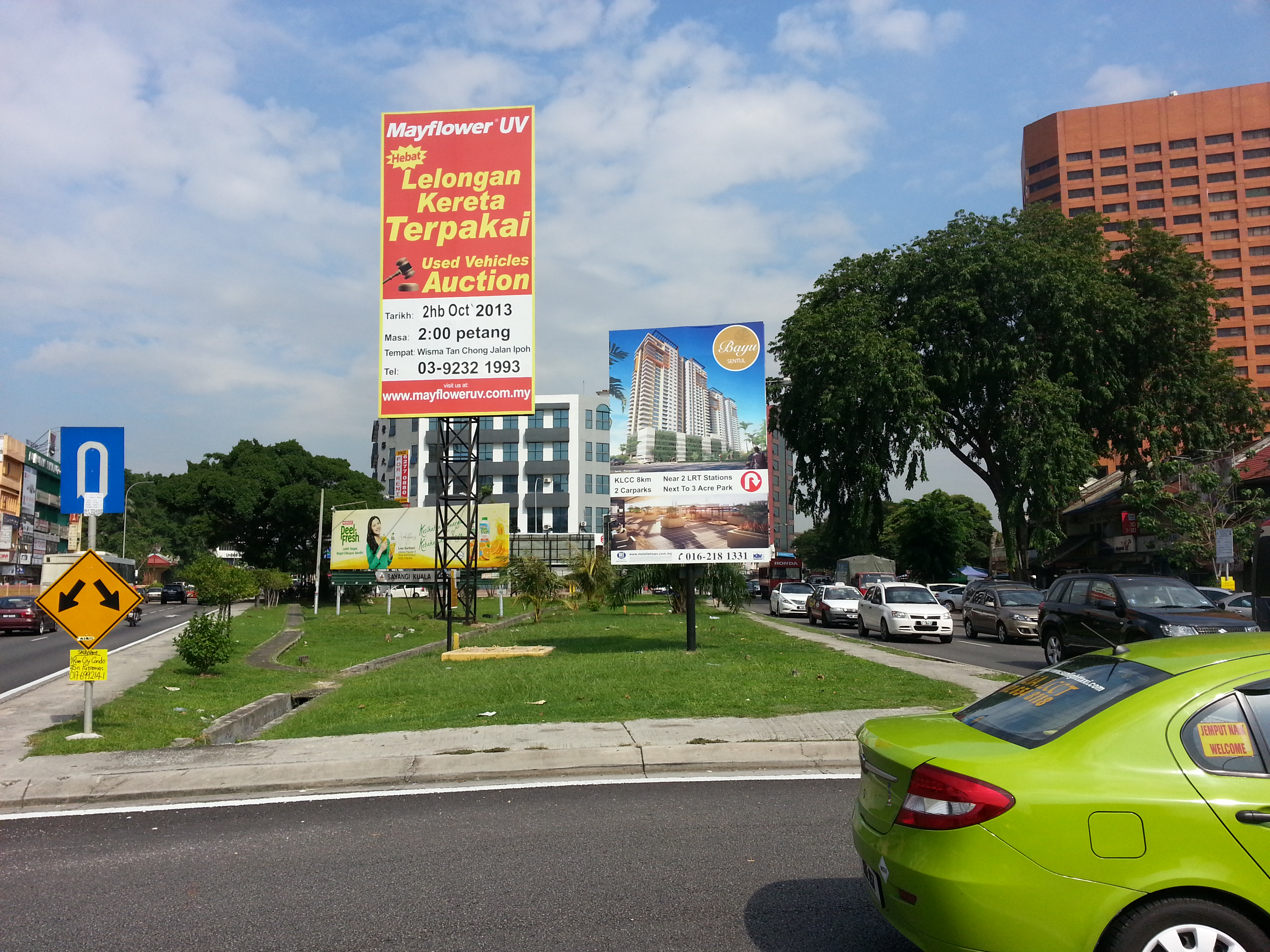
Jalan Ipoh in 2013, this section of the road is now part of Jalan Sultan Azlan Shah.

Jalan Ipoh obtained its name as the one and only road leading towards Ipoh from the city centre of Kuala Lumpur back then, part of the country's Federal Route 1. The road was formerly known as Batu Road. On the southeast end, the road used to extend to Chow Kit, forming a junction with Jalan Pahang, Jalan Raja Muda Abdul Aziz and Jalan Tuanku Abdul Rahman. On 26 November 2014, the Kuala Lumpur City Hall (DBKL) renamed the stretch from the Jalan Segambut junction to the Jalan Pahang junction of Jalan Ipoh to Jalan Sultan Azlan Shah.

== Public transportations ==
There are a total of 4 train stations along Jalan Ipoh serving both the KTM Seremban Line and MRT Putrajaya Line.

Jalan Ipoh MRT station. The station is located in the middle of Jalan Ipoh, forming a dual carriageway.

- KC02 Batu Kentonmen railway station
- PY14 Kentonmen MRT station
- PY15 Jalan Ipoh MRT station
- PY16 Sentul Barat MRT station (Jalan Sultan Azlan Shah side)

Buses which serve Jalan Ipoh area.

- Rapid Bus (MRT Feeder Bus)
  - T119 (MRT Kentonmen Pintu A–Perindustrian Taman Segambut)
  - T180 (MRT Sentul Barat–Taman Dato Senu)
- Rapid Bus (Rapid KL bus)
  - 151 (Bandar Baru Selayang–Hab Lebuh Pudu)
  - 173 (Taman Jasa Utama–Hab Medan Pasar)
- Selangor Omnibus
  - 103 (Hab Lebuh Pudu–Damansara Damai)
  - 104 (Hab Lebuh Pudu–Wangsa Permai)
  - 107 (Hab Lebuh Pudu–Bestari Jaya)
  - 120 (Hab Lebuh Pudu–Jinjang Utara)

== List of junctions ==
km	Exit	Junctions	To	Remarks
		Kepong Roundabout	West; FT 54 Jalan Kepong; FT 54 Kepong; FT 54 Sungai Buloh; FT 54 Kuala Selangor FT 1 Kuala Lumpur-Rawang Highway North Jalan Kuching; Ipoh; Rawang South Jalan Kuching; Kuala Lumpur; Cheras; Seremban	Roundabout interchange
		Batu		
		Sungai Mas Plaza		
		Taman Batu		
		Taman Kok Lian		
		Taman Eastern		
		Taman Segambut		
		Taman Impian		
		Batu Kentonmen	Batu Kentonmen Army Camp; Batu Kentonmen Komuter station	T-junctions
		Taman Bamboo		
		Taman Rainbow		Exit from Taman Rainbow only
		DUKE Interchange	West; Bamboo Hills; KL Digital City (under construction) Duta–Ulu Klang Expressway Duta–Ulu Klang Expressway (DUKE); Setiawangsa; Ulu Kelang; Gombak; Kuantan Southwest; Duta–Ulu Klang Expressway Duta–Ulu Klang Expressway (DUKE); Jalan Kuching; Segambut; Ipoh; Seremban; Shah Alam	Exit/Entrance ramp from river bridge
		Taman Kaya		
		-	-	Start/End of separate carriageway
		Segambut	West Jalan Tuanku Abdul Halim (Jalan Duta) Jalan Segambut; Segambut; Jalan Duta; Hentian Duta North–South Expressway Northern Route AH141 New Klang Valley Expressway; Ipoh; Klang; Kuala Lumpur International Airport (KLIA); Johor Bahru Southeast; Jalan Sultan Azlan Shah (Jalan Ipoh south section); Sentul; City Centre	From north only
				Start/End of separate carriageway
