= Taman Wahyu Komuter station =

Railway station in Kuala Lumpur, Malaysia

Taman Wahyu

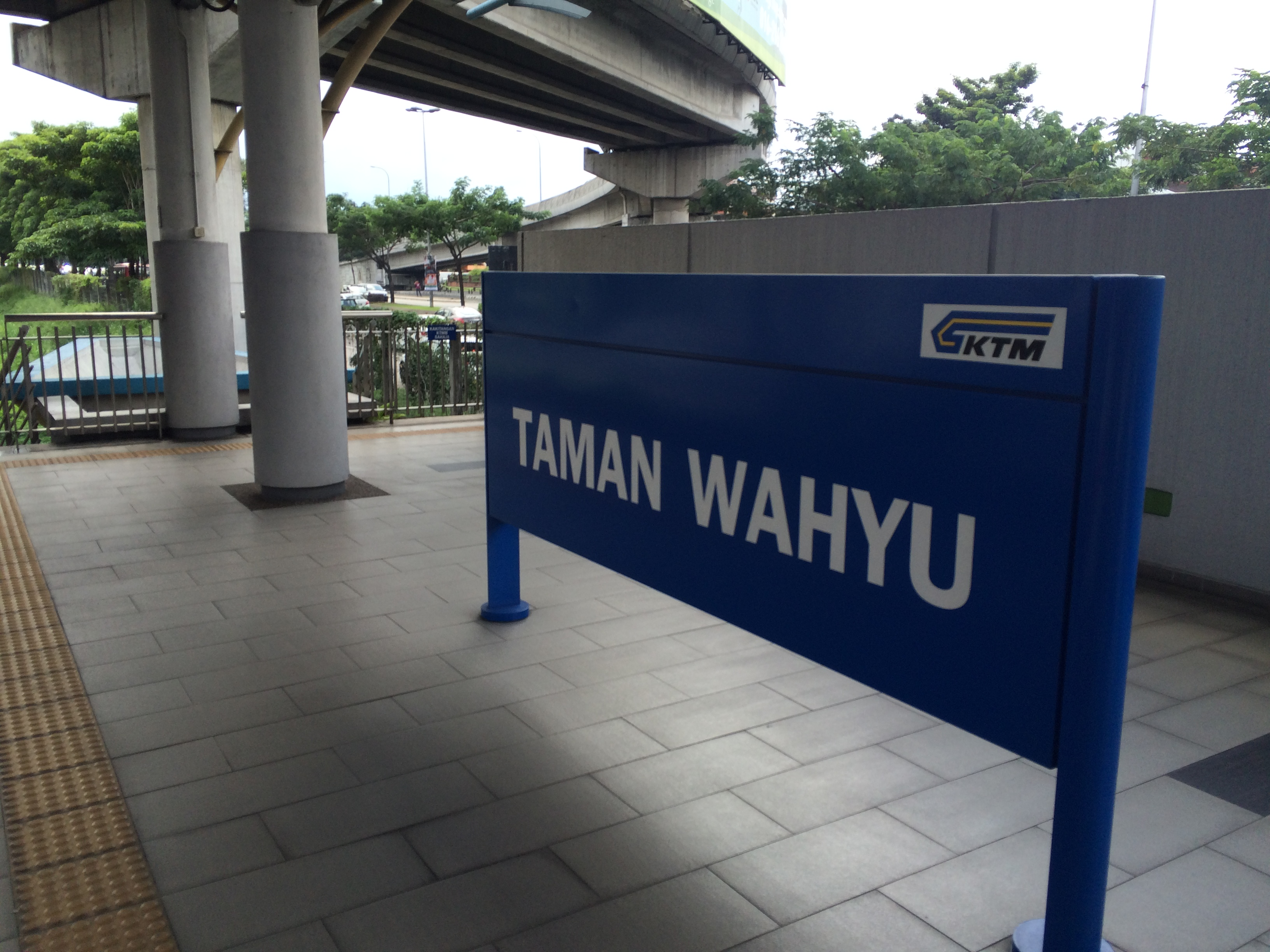

General information
- Other names: Malay: تامن وحي (Jawi); Chinese: 华友花园; Tamil: தாமான் வாயூ
- Location: Taman Wahyu, Kuala Lumpur, Malaysia
- Coordinates: 3°12′52.1″N 101°40′19.9″E
- System: KC04 | Commuter rail station
- Owner: Railway Assets Corporation
- Operator: Keretapi Tanah Melayu
- Line: Batu Caves branch
- Platforms: 2 side platforms
- Tracks: 2

Construction
- Parking: Available
- Accessible: Yes

Other information
- Station code: KC04

History
- Opened: April 2010
- Electrified: 2009–2010
- Former names: Kent

Services
Preceding station	Keretapi Tanah Melayu (Komuter)	Following station
Batu Caves Terminus	Batu Caves–Pulau Sebang Line	Kampung Batu towards Pulau Sebang/Tampin
Location

The Taman Wahyu Komuter station is a Malaysian commuter rail train station located in the east side of and named after Taman Wahyu, Kuala Lumpur.

== History ==
This station was known as Kent Halt or Kent station during British colonial rule, and until the 1980s.

In 2012, a woman in her fifties fell on to the tracks and was killed by a train.

== See also ==
- List of rail transit stations in Klang Valley
