= Sentul LRT station =

Metro station in Kuala Lumpur, Malaysia

AG2 SP2 Sentul
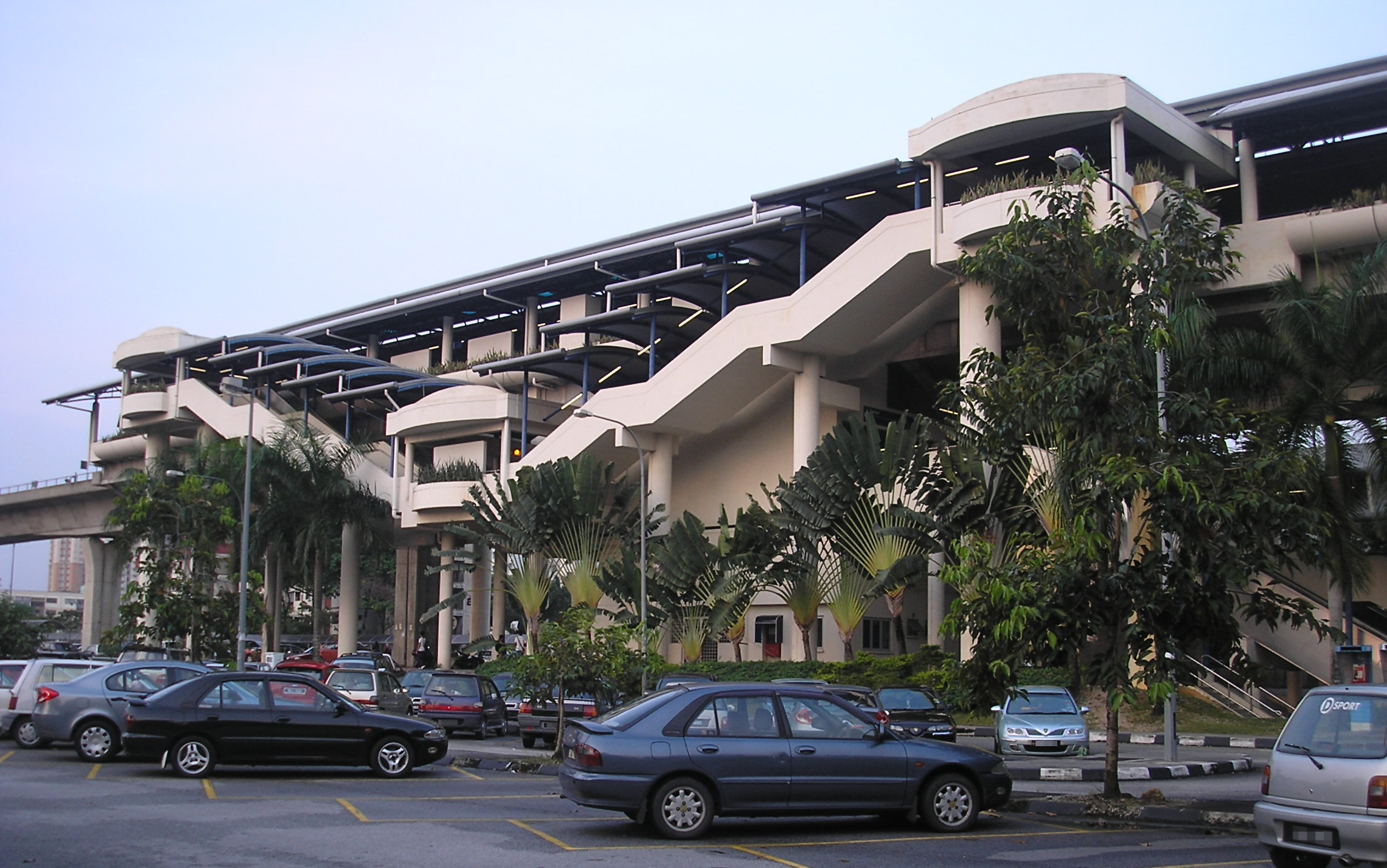
- Sentul station

General information
- Other names: Malay: سنتول (Jawi); Chinese: 冼都; Tamil: செந்தூல்
- Location: Jalan 2/48A, Bandar Baru Sentul, Sentul; 51000 Kuala Lumpur; Malaysia
- Coordinates: 3°10′42″N 101°41′43″E
- System: Rapid KL
- Owner: Prasarana Malaysia
- Operator: Rapid Rail
- Lines: 3 Ampang Line; 4 Sri Petaling Line
- Platforms: 2 side platforms
- Tracks: 2

Construction
- Structure type: Elevated
- Platform levels: 2
- Parking: Available with payment. 158 total parking bays.
- Cycle facilities: Available. 20 bicycle bays.

Other information
- Station code: AG2 SP2

History
- Opened: 6 December 1998; 27 years ago
- Former names: Bandar Baru Sentul

Services
Preceding station		Following station
Sentul Timur Terminus	Ampang Line	Titiwangsa towards Ampang
Sentul Timur Terminus	Sri Petaling Line	Titiwangsa towards Putra Heights
Location

Sentul LRT station is an elevated light rapid transit (LRT) station operated by Rapid Rail located in Sentul, Kuala Lumpur, Malaysia. It is served by the LRT Ampang Line and LRT Sri Petaling Line. This station is situated next to two secondary schools, the Methodist Boys Secondary School Sentul and the Wesley Methodist School, three primary schools, and several medium-density, low-cost housing developments.

This LRT station, despite sharing the same name, is not interchangeable (or integrated) and not to be confused with the separate but adjacent Sentul Komuter station, which is served by KTM Komuter's Batu Caves–Pulau Sebang Line instead. The two stations are approximately 800 meters in walking distance away from each other. The Komuter station was the first rail transit station in Sentul and served the older section of the suburb, while the LRT station was a later addition and serves the newer development of the suburb. (the location "Bandar Baru Sentul" was previously added to the LRT station on official rail transit maps to avoid confusion) The station was opened to the public in 1998 as part of the final phase of development of the former STAR LRT Line.

== Station features ==
=== Location ===
Sentul LRT station is located along Jalan 2/48A, to the west of Apartment Bandar Baru Sentul. Also near the station are the Residensi Sentulmas and The Capers condominiums. Public facilities nearby include the Methodist Grace and Malaysian Pentecostal church, the Sri Maha Muneeswarar temple, the DBKL abandoned vehicles depot, and UTC Sentul. Nearby schools include the Methodist Boys' Secondary School (SMK Methodist (L) Sentul), and the Wesley Methodist International School.

=== Station layout ===
This station has three floors, with the second floor serving the platforms, the first floor serving the concourse, and the exits being on the ground floor. This station contains two side platforms used by the Ampang and Sri Petaling lines. Ramps, tactile floor blocks, and lifts are available for the disabled, and the station has 158 car parking bays and a bicycle rack that can accommodate up to 20 bicycles.

L2
Side platform, doors will open on the left
Platform 2
3 Ampang Line towards AG18 Ampang (→)

4 Sri Petaling Line towards SP31 Putra Heights (→)

Platform 1
3 Ampang Line and 4 Sri Petaling Line towards AG1 SP1 Sentul Timur (←)
Side platform, doors will open on the left
L1
Concourse
Ticket machines, fare gates into paid area, customer service centre
G
Ground floor
Entrances and exits, car park, bicycle parking, bus stop, taxi stand

=== Platforms ===
Sentul LRT station is one of the eleven stations along the common route between Sentul Timur and Chan Sow Lin shared by the Ampang and Sri Petaling lines. The station contains two side platforms, with platform 1 serving trains towards Sentul Timur, and platform 2 for trains towards Ampang or Putra Heights. As with the other stations along the common route, both lines share the same tracks, so both lines use the same platforms at this station.

== Transport connections ==
=== Feeder buses ===
Route No.	Origin	Desitination	Via
T180	PY16 Sentul Barat (Entrance C)	SMK Bandar Baru Sentul	AG1 SP1 Sentul Timur AG2 SP2 Sentul Taman Dato Senu Masjid Raudhatul Muttaqin

== History ==
The station is served by the Ampang Line and Sri Petaling Line. Opened in 1998 as part of the lines' second phase of development under the previous STAR LRT system, the station was intended to connect Sentul to other parts of the city and surrounding areas. Under this phase, a 15 km track with 11 stations was built to serve the northern and southern areas of Kuala Lumpur to cater for the Commonwealth Village and National Sports Complex in Bukit Jalil, during the 1998 Commonwealth Games in Kuala Lumpur. At that time, the Sentul LRT station was called "Bandar Baru Sentul".
