= Sentul Timur LRT station =

Metro station in Kuala Lumpur, Malaysia

AG1 SP1 Sentul Timur
- Platform view of the station.

General information
- Other names: Malay: سنتول تيمور (Jawi); Chinese: 冼都东; Tamil: செந்தூல் தீமோர்
- Location: Jalan 2/48A, Sentul; 51000 Kuala Lumpur; Malaysia
- Coordinates: 3°11′9″N 101°41′43″E
- System: Rapid KL
- Owner: Prasarana Malaysia
- Operator: Rapid Rail
- Lines: 3 Ampang Line; 4 Sri Petaling Line
- Platforms: 2 side platforms
- Tracks: 2

Construction
- Structure type: Elevated
- Platform levels: 2
- Parking: Available with payment. 55 total parking bays.

Other information
- Station code: AG1 SP1

History
- Opened: 6 December 1998; 27 years ago

Services
Preceding station		Following station
Terminus	Ampang Line	Sentul towards Ampang
Terminus	Sri Petaling Line	Sentul towards Putra Heights
Location

Sentul Timur LRT station is an elevated light rapid transit (LRT) station and serves as the northern terminal station for the LRT Ampang Line and LRT Sri Petaling Line. The station is located in Sentul, a suburb of Kuala Lumpur, and is surrounded by medium density low-cost housing developments. Pangsapuri Melur is the nearest residential property to this station.

Sentul is a main town area in Kuala Lumpur. It is divided into two sections namely Sentul Barat (West Sentul) and Sentul Timur (East Sentul). Jalan Sentul and Jalan Ipoh are the two major roads serving this area.

Although not designated as an official interchange, commuters may walk up to the Sentul Komuter station on the KTM Batu Caves-Pulau Sebang Line, which is an approximately 15 – 20 minutes walking distance from the LRT station.

== Station features ==
=== Location ===
Sentul Timur LRT station is located along Jalan 2/48A. To the east of the station is Pangsapuri Bandar Baru Sentul, and to the west of the station is SK Covent Sentul 2. Additionally, the SkyMeridien Sentul East, Rafflesia Sentul, and The Fennel Sentul East condominiums are close to the station, as well as Pangsapuri Mawar, Athi Eeswaran temple, and the Sentul Perdana Community Centre.

=== Station layout ===
The station has three floors, with the second floor serving the platforms, the first floor acting as the concourse, and the exits being on the ground floor. The station has two side platforms used by the Ampang and Sri Petaling Lines. Ramps, tactile floor blocks, and lifts are available for the disabled, and the station has 55 car parking bays and a bicycle rack that can accommodate up to 20 bicycles.

L2
Side platform, doors will open on the left
Platform 2
3 Ampang Line towards AG18 Ampang (→)

4 Sri Petaling Line towards SP31 Putra Heights (→)

Platform 1
Trains terminate here
Side platform, doors will open on the left
L1
Concourse
Ticket machines, fare gates into paid area, customer service centre
G
Ground floor
Entrances and exits, car park, bicycle parking, bus stop, taxi stand

=== Platforms ===
Platforms 1 and 2 (July 2022)

As the terminus for both the Ampang and Sri Petaling Lines, Sentul Timur station has two platforms, of which Platform 1 is the alighting-only platform, and Platform 2 is the boarding platform for trains towards Ampang or Putra Heights. Both lines use the same tracks between Sentul Timur and Chan Sow Lin stations, so both lines use the same platforms in this station.

== Transport connections ==
=== Feeder buses ===
Route No.	Origin	Destination	Via
T180	PY16 Sentul Barat (Entrance C)	SMK Bandar Baru Sentul	AG1 SP1 Sentul Timur; AG2 SP2 Sentul; Taman Dato Senu; Masjid Raudhatul Muttaqin

== History ==
The station is served by the LRT Ampang Line and LRT Sri Petaling Line. Opened in 1998 as part of the lines' Phase 2 of development under the former STAR LRT system, the station was intended to connect Sentul Timur to other parts of the city and surrounding areas. Under Phase 2, a 15 km track with 11 stations was built to serve the northern and southern areas of Kuala Lumpur to cater for the Commonwealth Village and National Sports Complex in Bukit Jalil, during the 1998 Commonwealth Games held in Kuala Lumpur.

== Incidents ==
On 27 October 2006, a six-coach Adtranz LRT train which came in from Ampang overshot the end of the elevated tracks at the end of this station, resulting in the front half of the first coach dangling in the air about 25 m above the ground. A lone driver was the only one on board when the incident took place. Only Sentul Timur endured service disruption for 20 minutes that day.
