= Sentul Komuter station =

Malaysian commuter train station

Sentul

General information
- Other names: Malay: سنتول (Jawi); Chinese: 冼都; Tamil: செந்தூல்
- Location: Jalan Perhentian, Sentul, Kuala Lumpur; Malaysia
- Coordinates: 3°11′0″N 101°41′20″E
- System: KC01 | Commuter rail station
- Owner: Railway Assets Corporation
- Operator: Keretapi Tanah Melayu
- Line: Batu Caves branch
- Platforms: 1 side platform and 1 island platform
- Tracks: 3

Construction
- Parking: Available. Free parking bays
- Accessible: Yes

Other information
- Station code: KC01

History
- Opened: 1905
- Rebuilt: 2010
- Electrified: 1995

Services
Preceding station	Keretapi Tanah Melayu (Komuter)	Following station
Batu Kentonmen towards Batu Caves	Batu Caves–Pulau Sebang Line	Putra towards Pulau Sebang/Tampin
Location

The Sentul Komuter station is a Malaysian commuter rail train station located on the east side of and named after Sentul, Kuala Lumpur. Since 2015, the station is served by the Batu Caves-Pulau Sebang Line of the KTM Komuter train services. For a long time, this station served as the northern terminus of the Sentul-Port Klang route until the line was extended to Batu Caves, when the station continued to be on the Batu Caves-Port Klang Line until a route change in December 2015 to accommodate the Klang Valley Double Tracking upgrade.

The station is located at the end of Jalan Perhentian, off Jalan Sultan Azlan Shah.

The station is situated a certain distance away from two elevated LRT Ampang and Sri Petaling Lines stations and one underground MRT Putrajaya Line, which all share similar names and serve the same locality. The Sentul Komuter station is located 730 m northwest and 900 m southwest from the Sentul Timur and Sentul LRT stations, respectively, and 600 m southeast from the Sentul Barat MRT station. Despite sharing similar names, the Komuter stations are not designated as an interchange with the LRT and MRT stations.

== Design ==
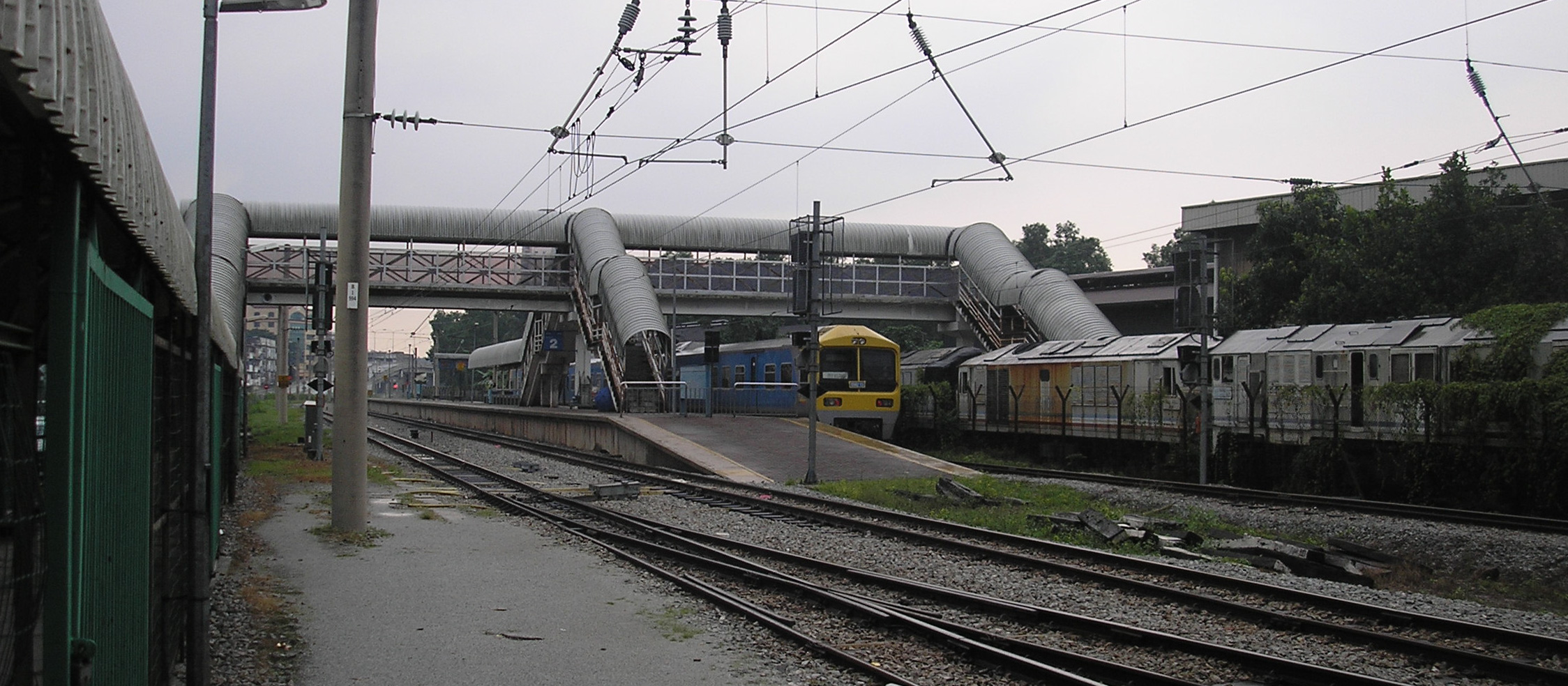
A platform view of the old station depicts one platform connected by two footbridges.

The Sentul station as a building had existed since Sentul was used as a central workshop and depot for Federated Malay States Railway trains, but was not demolished and replaced during the 1989-1995 Klang Valley electrification and double-tracking project. Rather, the building was retained and retrofitted to support access to the then-new KTM Komuter services, with the addition of faregates and the upgrading of the ticket office. The station was also one of a few remaining stations designated in the Komuter system to be made out of wood. Although located along more than three railway tracks and located beside a major depot, the station was fashioned as a modestly sized station, with room for only a waiting area and a two-room office space. The station was, nevertheless, in charge of managing railway switches and supported a small railway staff.

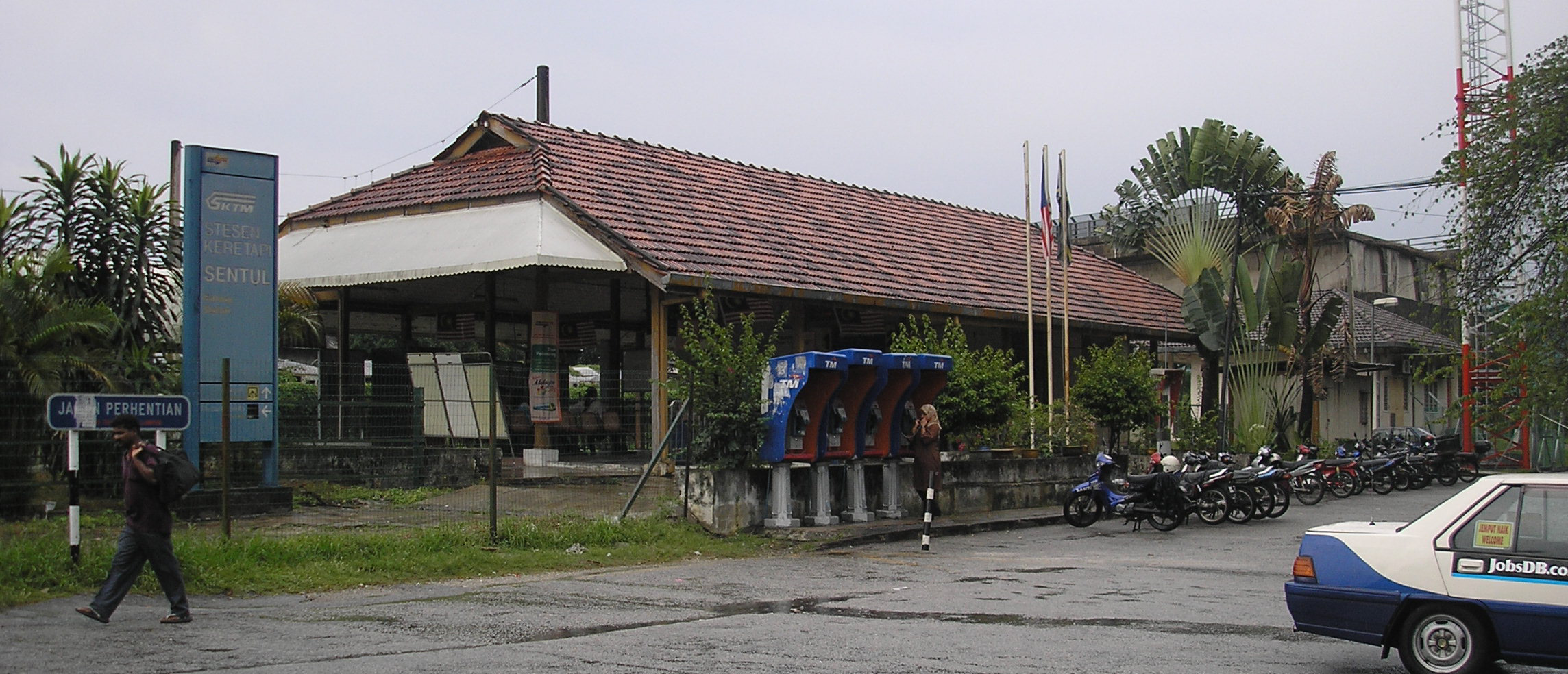
Sentul station before renovation

The station retained a gap between the building and the railway line, suggesting a side platform that was removed during the electrification project, in place of a single island platform, between two railway tracks, laid 70 m southwest from the station. The main building is linked to the platform via a long sheltered walkway and an overhead pedestrian bridge. The pedestrian bridge is also connected to a train depot, but closed to the public.

The station has since undergone several renovations. The original wooden station has been completely replaced with a modern steel and concrete station with an elevated ticketing area above the modern tracks and platforms.

== Depots ==
The Sentul station is linked to two major train depots. One is the older and larger Sentul Works depot, serving Keretapi Tanah Melayu in general, east from the Komuter station. The Sentul Works depot has been operational since 1905, before Peninsular Malaysia's independence, consisting of numerous brick buildings and metal sheds primarily used as workshops and storage areas for steam and diesel locomotives and railway cars. Occupying an estimated 5.2 hectares (13 acres) of land, the Sentul Works depot is the largest train depot in Malaysia, but has been deemed dilapidated after decades of use, and the majority of the connecting railway lines to the north and west were dismantled and replaced by parklands, called Sentul Park. A central workshop constructed in Batu Gajah was slated to replace the Sentul Works depot by August 2009, with the land it was formerly situated on to be earmarked for property development by YTL Land & Development, as part of the Sentul East and Sentul West master plan. The depot's westernmost brick train shed was remodelled for use as the Kuala Lumpur Performing Arts Centre, and opened in 2005.

A second, more recent train depot, further north from the Sentul station, is primarily designated for KTM Komuter EMUs, where the storage and maintenance of a majority of the Komuter service's rolling stock takes place. The depot consists of two metal framed structures covered with metal sheets located along what was a portion of the main railway lines, connected to then-sparsely used Sentul-Batu Caves single track line. A single railway line running around the EMU depot acted as a direct link between the Sentul station to the Sentul-Batu Caves line.

== Replacement ==
In comparison to most older but smaller train stations along on the Komuter service, the replacement of Sentul station was planned to take place much later after Komuter services began operations in 1995. During the early 2000s, YTL Land & Development had vested interest in developing the area surrounding the station. Its master plan included a newer and more integrated station in place of its older counterpart. The project faced several years of delays, and the old station was allowed to continue operations.

It was later announced that the station would form part of the long-postponed double-tracking, modernisation and electrification of the Sentul-Batu Caves line, as well as the resumption of YTL's development project. Site possession was given to YTL on 17 November 2006 and the project was scheduled to be completed in May 2009. The rebuilt Sentul station opened in 2010 as the first completed package of the project.
