= Sentul, Kuala Lumpur =

Sentul
- Suburb
- Interactive map of Sentul
- Coordinates: 3°12′27″N 101°40′58″E
- Country: Malaysia
- State: Federal Territory of Kuala Lumpur
- Constituency: Batu

Government
  - Local Authority: Dewan Bandaraya Kuala Lumpur
- Time zone: UTC+8 (MST)
- Postcode: 51000
- Police: Sentul District Police Headquarters
- Fire: Sentul Fire and Rescue Station

Sentul is a suburb located within the northern part of the city centre in Kuala Lumpur, Malaysia, in the constituency of Batu. The vicinity of Sentul is sandwiched between Bukit Tunku and Titiwangsa.

== History ==
Sentul is a former railway hub famous for its old-world charm, historical temples and prewar shops. During World War II, Sentul was one of the last towns in Kuala Lumpur that was heavily bombed by the British B-29 planes without any warning on 19 February 1945. The bombing targeted two rail complexes managed by Marai Tetsudo, the Japanese name for the former Federated Malay States Railway (FMSR). The destruction of the central workshop signified the end of the Japanese Occupation in Malaya.

Most of the early residents in Sentul were Indians working in the train depot and central workshop built by the British, dating back to 1896.

== Education ==
=== Primary schools ===
- Sekolah Kebangsaan Bandar Baru Sentul
- Sekolah Kebangsaan Convent Sentul 1
- Sekolah Kebangsaan Convent Sentul 2
- Sekolah Kebangsaan La Salle (1) Sentul
- Sekolah Kebangsaan Sentul 1
- Sekolah Kebangsaan Sentul 2
- Sekolah Kebangsaan Sentul Utama
- Sekolah Kebangsaan Seri Perak
- Sekolah Kebangsaan (L) Methodist Sentul (Methodist Boys Primary School, Sentul)
- SJK (C) Chi Man
- SJK (C) Sentul
- SJK (C) Sentul Pasar
- SJK (T) Sentul
- SJK (T) St Joseph
- SJK (T) Thamboosamy Pillai

=== Secondary schools ===
- Sekolah Menengah Kebangsaan Bandar Baru Sentul
- Sekolah Menengah Kebangsaan Convent Sentul
- Sekolah Menengah Kebangsaan Maxwell
- Sekolah Menengah Kebangsaan La Salle Sentul
- Sekolah Menengah Kebangsaan Sentul Utama
- Sekolah Menengah Kebangsaan (L) Methodist Sentul (Methodist Boys Secondary School, Sentul)
- Wesley Methodist School Kuala Lumpur (International)

== Accessibility ==
Sentul is easily accessible via the Kuala Lumpur Middle Ring Road 2 (MRR2), Duta-Ulu Kelang Expressway (DUKE), Sultan Iskandar Highway, Jalan Duta-Segambut Highway, and Sentul Link, as well as through arterial roads such as Jalan Tun Razak, Jalan Ipoh, Jalan Pahang, Jalan Kuching, and Jalan Kepong.

Sentul is served by four stations, two light rapid transit (LRT) stations; namely Sentul Timur and Sentul on the shared alignment of the 3 4 Ampang and Sri Petaling Lines since 1998, a commuter rail station; Sentul currently served by KTM Komuter's 1 Batu Caves–Pulau Sebang Line since 2015 (previously served by 2 Sentul–Port Klang from 1905 to 2015); as well as a mass rapid transit (MRT) station, Sentul Barat served by the 12 Putrajaya Line since 2023.
