= Jalan Bangsar =

Road in Malaysia

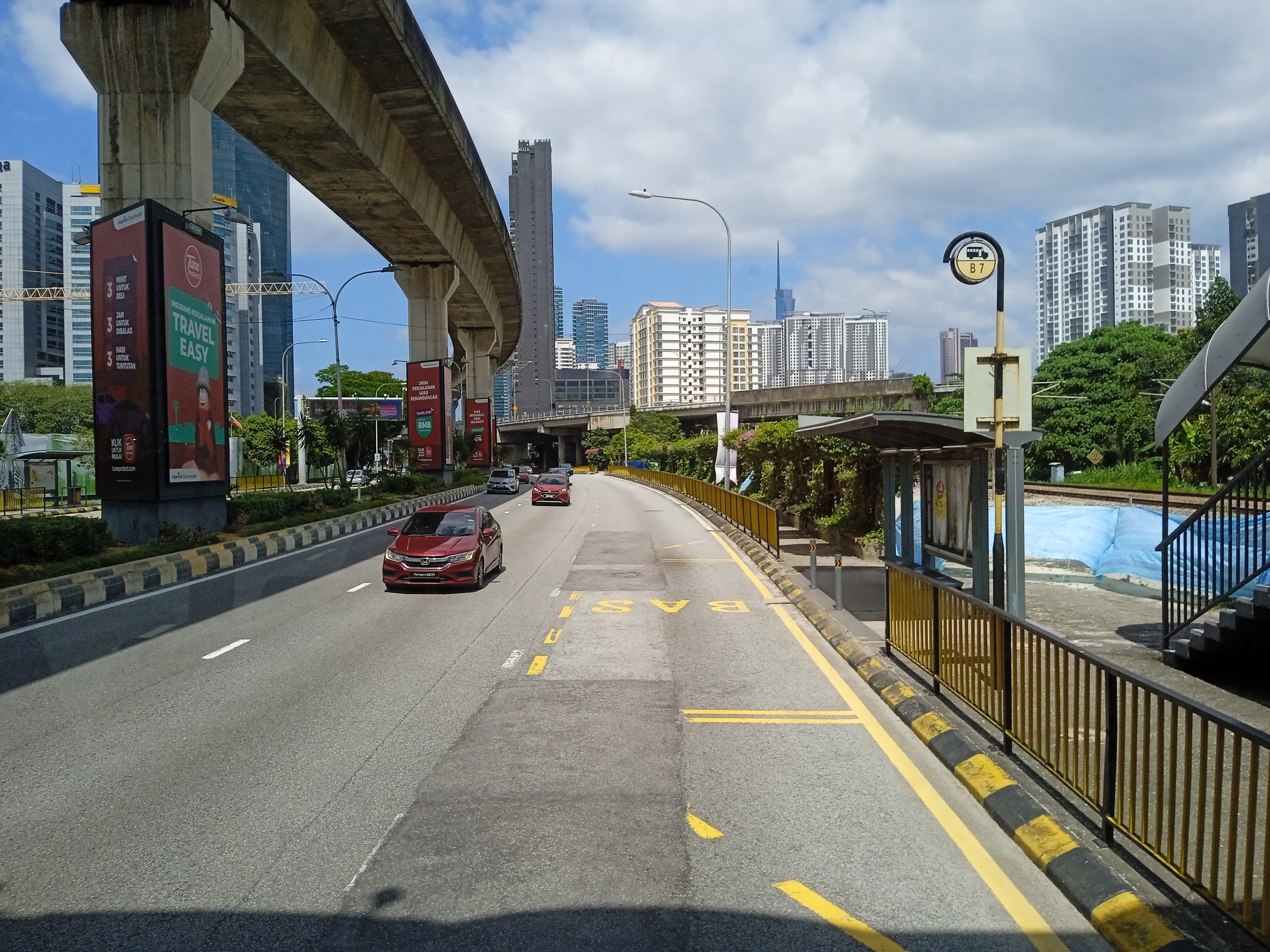

Major junctions
- North end: Bulatan Tugu; Kuala Lumpur Inner Ring Road
- Kuala Lumpur Inner Ring Road; Kuala Lumpur Middle Ring Road 1 Jalan Rakyat (Jalan Travers); Bangsar-Petaling Jaya Bypass; Jalan Maarof; New Pantai Expressway New Pantai Expressway going into Kuala Lumpur
- Southwest end: Bangsar

Location
- Country: Malaysia
- Primary destinations: KL Sentral; Brickfields; Bangsar

Highway system
- Highways in Malaysia; Expressways; Federal; State

Jalan Bangsar is a major road in Kuala Lumpur, Malaysia, it starts from the New Pantai Expressway before merging into Jalan Travers, another major road which splits from the middle lanes of Jalan Bangsar. Nearby buildings include the Alila Bangsar Kuala Lumpur hotel.

== Construction of the Jalan Travers-Bangsar flyover junctions ==
The Jalan Travers-Bangsar junctions have been upgraded into flyover junctions. Construction began in early 2010 and was completed in mid-2010. Both projects were led by Kuala Lumpur City Hall (Dewan Bandaraya Kuala Lumpur) (DBKL) and Malaysian Resources Corporation Berhad (MRCB). On 8 August 2010, the flyover of the Jalan Travers-Bangsar junctions opened to traffic.

== List of interchange/junctions ==
km	Exit	Interchange/junctions	To	Remarks
			Southwest; New Pantai Expressway New Pantai Expressway; Jalan Pantai Baharu; Bandar Sunway; Subang Jaya	
New Pantai Expressway New Pantai Expressway; Start/End of expressway NPE border limit
Jalan Bangsar; DBKL border limit
		Jalan Maarof	Northwest; Jalan Maarof; Bangsar Baru; Bukit Bandaraya; Bukit Damansara; Damansara Town Centre	T-junctions
		Bangsar-Petaling Jaya Bypass	South; Bangsar-Petaling Jaya Bypass; Mid Valley City; Petaling Jaya; Shah Alam; Klang	T-junctions
		Bangsar		
Jalan Bangsar
Jalan Rakyat (Jalan Travers)
		Jalan Rakyat (Jalan Travers)	Southeast; Jalan Rakyat (Jalan Travers); Jalan Tun Sambanthan; Brickfields; KL Sentral	T-junctions with one flyover to Jalan Bangsar (Bangsar bound)
		Jalan Rakyat police station		
Jalan Rakyat (Jalan Travers)
Jalan Damansara
		Muzium Negara (West)	North; Kuala Lumpur Middle Ring Road 1 Jalan Damansara; Jalan Duta; Ipoh; Klang; PWTC; Sentul; Kuantan	Interchange
		KL Sentral	South; Jalan Stesen Sentral; P&R KL Sentral; Kuala Lumpur Sentral Station; Le Meridien Hotel; Arrival/Departure; TnG TAG Hub; KTM Intercity KTM Komuter KTM ETS 5 6 7	From city centre
		Muzium Negara (National Museum) Muzium Negara MRT station	Muzium Negara (National Museum) Muzium Negara MRT station 9	From Bangsar only
		Muzium Negara (East)	East; Kuala Lumpur Middle Ring Road 1 Jalan Damansara; Sungai Besi; Cheras; Seremban; Petaling Jaya; Shah Alam; Klang; Istana Negara (Royal Museum)	Interchange
		Suleiman Building	Suleiman Building	
		Hotel Majestic		
		Tourist Information Centre		
		Hotel Majestic		
		Jalan Sultan Sulaiman	East; Jalan Sultan Sulaiman (Suleiman Road); Brickfields	
Jalan Damansara
Jalan Sultan Hishamuddin (Victory Avenue)
		Keretapi Tanah Melayu Berhad (KTMB) main headquarters P&R Kuala Lumpur Railway Station	Keretapi Tanah Melayu Berhad (KTMB) Main Headquarters Kuala Lumpur Railway Station KTM Komuter	
		Bulatan Tugu	West; Jalan Perdana (Jalan Venning); Masjid Negara; Makam Pahlawan; Islamic Arts Museum Malaysia; Pusat Islam Malaysia; Perdana Lake Gardens; Kuala Lumpur Bird Park; Muzium Polis; Taman Bunga Raya; Memorial Tun Abdul Razak; Planetarium Negara Northwest; Kuala Lumpur Inner Ring Road; Jalan Sultan Hishamuddin (Victory Avenue); City centre Dataran Merdeka; Dayabumi North; Jalan Tugu (Cenotaph Road); Jalan Cenderasari; Dayabumi	Roundabout
