= Mid-Valley =

Mid valley or Midvalley may refer to:

== Malaysia ==
- Mid Valley City, a mixed development project in Kuala Lumpur
- Mid Valley Komuter station, a commuter train station in Seputeh, Kuala Lumpur
- Mid Valley Link, a major highway in Kuala Lumpur
- Mid Valley Megamall, a mall in Kuala Lumpur

== Other uses ==
- Mid-Valley (Oregon), an area in the Willamette Valley, Oregon, U.S.
- Mid Valley Airport, Weslaco, Texas
- Mid Valley School District, a public school in Pennsylvania, U.S.
