= Bangsar–Petaling Jaya Bypass =

Road in Malaysia

Bangsar – Petaling Jaya Bypass
- Lebuhraya Pintasan Bangsar – Petaling Jaya

Route information
- Existed: 1996–present
- History: Completed in 1998

Major junctions
- North end: Jalan Bangsar
- Jalan Maarof; Jalan Bangsar; FT 2 Federal Highway
- South end: Mid Valley City interchange on FT 2 Federal Highway

Location
- Country: Malaysia
- Primary destinations: Mid Valley City; Petaling Jaya; Shah Alam; Klang

Highway system
- Highways in Malaysia; Expressways; Federal; State

The Bangsar–Petaling Jaya Bypass or Lebuhraya Pintasan Bangsar-Petaling Jaya is a major highway in Kuala Lumpur city, Malaysia. The highway passing Mid Valley City from Bangsar to Federal Highway. This highway is maintained by the Kuala Lumpur City Hall or Dewan Bandaraya Kuala Lumpur (DBKL).

== List of interchanges ==
Km	Exit	Interchange	To	Remarks
			North; Jalan Maarof; Bangsar Baru; Bukit Bandaraya; Bukit Damansara; Damansara Town Centre	
		Mid Valley flyover	Below Flyover; Jalan Bangsar; City centre KL Sentral; New Pantai Expressway New Pantai Expressway; Bandar Sunway; Subang Jaya	Start/End of flyover
		Mid Valley flyover Jalan Bangsar	Jalan Bangsar Northeast; City centre KL Sentral Southwest; Jalan Pantai Baharu; New Pantai Expressway New Pantai Expressway; Bandar Sunway; Subang Jaya	T-junctions
		Mid Valley flyover Railway crossing bridge		
		Mid Valley flyover Sungai Klang Bridge		
		Mid Valley City (East)	Lingkaran Syed Putra; Mid Valley City; Mid Valley Megamall; Zone A, B, C, D, E and F	From Bangsar only
		Mid Valley City (North)	Mid Valley City; Zone A, B, C, D, E and F	From Bangsar only
		Mid Valley City (West)	Medan Syed Putra Selatan; Mid Valley City; Lingkaran Syed Putra; Mid Valley Megamall; Citadel Mid Valley; Zone A, B, C, D, E and F	From Bangsar only
		Federal Highway	West; FT 2 Federal Highway; Sprint Expressway Damansara; FT 2 Petaling Jaya; FT 2 Shah Alam; FT 2 Klang	Interchange
