= Hotel Majestic (Kuala Lumpur) =

Hotel in Kuala Lumpur, Malaysia

Hotel Majestic, Kuala Lumpur
- Interactive map of the Hotel Majestic, Kuala Lumpur area

General information
- Type: Hotel
- Architectural style: Neoclassical and Art Deco hybrid
- Location: 5, Jalan Sultan Hisamuddin, Kuala Lumpur, Malaysia
- Coordinates: 03°08′19.8″N 101°41′30.4″E
- Completed: 1932

Hotel Majestic is the historical hotel in Kuala Lumpur, Malaysia. This hotel is located near Kuala Lumpur Railway Station and is part of the Autograph Collection.

== History ==
Originally opened in 1932, the hotel was commissioned by the Trustees of the Estate of Loke Wan Tho, the youngest son of Loke Yew, and sited on a hillside edging Lake Gardens, opposite the Kuala Lumpur Railway Station. Designed by architectural firm Keys and Dowdeswell, the complex was fashioned in a transitional hybrid of Beaux-Arts and Art Deco styles, with extensive use of arches, pilasters and cornice on the main block, a more vernacular double-storey annexe, and an extended Art Deco porte-cochère that leads down the hill.

The 51-room hotel served as a more luxurious counterpart to the Kuala Lumpur station's built-in hotel and various contemporaries in Kuala Lumpur, with larger rooms, furnishing and silverware imported from England, modern plumbing with hot and cold water, showers, and long baths in 18 rooms, and a roof garden with a dance floor and seating for 350 patrons. As a result, the hotel, with its ease of access to railway transport and Kuala Lumpur proper, was often patronised by the colonial and social elites during its British colonial heyday.

During the Japanese occupation of Malaya in World War II, the hotel was used as a transit camp by the Japanese occupation government. When Japan surrendered, it was reported that a Japanese soldier committed suicide in Room 48. The hotel resumed operation after the war, continuing to serve as an upscale venue and hotel for several more decades. One of the highlights of its post-war history was on September 17, 1951, where an inaugural meeting for the formation of the Independence of Malaya Party (IMP), a non-racial party, was held by Onn Jaafar and presided by Tan Cheng Lock, then President of the Malayan Chinese Association (MCA), at the hotel.

After the hotel was pressured by competition from the more modern Merlin, Hilton, Equatorial and Federal Hotels (all in Bukit Bintang district) by the 1970s, the Majestic was closed in 1983 following the building's gazette as a historic landmark by the Malaysian government under the Antiquities Act and acquired by the government for use to house the National Art Gallery from 1984 on. In 1995, an agreement was reached between the government, Syarikat Tanah dan Harta (a Finance Ministry incorporated property holding company) and YTL Corporation to privatise development of the hotel in exchange for YTL constructing a new building for the National Art Gallery.

After the National Art Gallery vacated the hotel complex in 1998, it was mothballed for a decade until YTL commenced development of the site in 2008, augmenting the original complex with a new 15-storey, 253-room "Tower Wing" built on an adjacent vacant land parcel directly south, while restoring the original complex into a 47-room "Majestic Wing". The expanded hotel complex, branded as The Majestic Hotel Kuala Lumpur and under the management of YTL subsidiary, YTL Hotels, was reopened on December 8, 2012.

== Access ==
The Kuala Lumpur railway station, served by KTM Komuter and ETS, is located directly across the road. The station is connected to Pasar Seni LRT/MRT stationby a pedestrian bridge across the Klang River.

Pedestrian access from Muzium Negara MRT station (and by extension KL Sentral) is possible through a 500 metre walk along Jalan Damansara

== See also ==
- Carcosa Seri Negara
- Eastern & Oriental Hotel
- Raffles Hotel in Singapore
