= The Boulevard Hotel Kuala Lumpur =

Business hotel in Kuala Lumpur, Malaysia

The Boulevard Hotel
- Location within Kuala Lumpur
- Hotel chain: CHM Hotels

General information
- Type: Hotel
- Location: Mid Valley City, Lingkaran Syed Putra, Kuala Lumpur, Malaysia
- Coordinates: 3.119366°N 101.677538°E
- Opened: 2004
- Owner: CHM Hotels

Other information
- Number of rooms: 390

Website
- Official website

The Boulevard Hotel is a 4-star business hotel, located at Mid Valley City, Kuala Lumpur. It is part of the hotel chain CHM Hotels. The 4 star hotel is located next to the main entrance of the Mid Valley Megamall.
