= Mid Valley City =

Area of Kuala Lumpur, Malaysia

Coordinates: 3.117933°N 101.676847°E

Mid Valley City is a large mixed development in the Lembah Pantai ward in southwestern Kuala Lumpur, Malaysia. The development consists of The Gardens shopping mall, Mid Valley Megamall and three hotels, namely the Cititel Mid Valley, The Boulevard Hotel Kuala Lumpur and the Gardens Hotels and Residences.

== Background ==
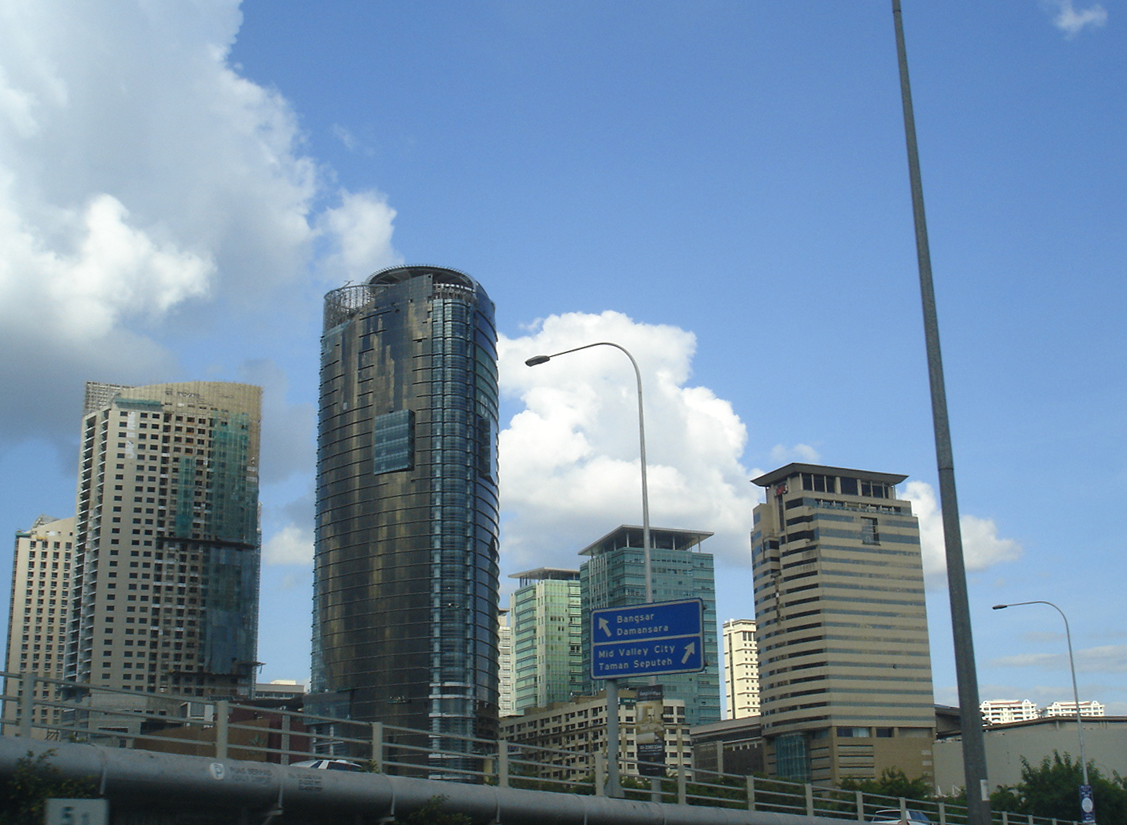
Some of the buildings on the development, seen from the Federal Highway.

When it was planned in the late 1980s, it was initially named Bandar Syed Putra, named after Jalan Syed Putra Federal Route 2 that runs through the southern flank of the development. The site that was selected for the development was formerly occupied by an abattoir.

First planned in 1991 as one of two mega retail projects in Kuala Lumpur, IGB began developing phase one of Mid Valley in mid-1992, projected to cost RM 650 million.

== Accessibility ==
It is accessible by both road and rail transport.

=== Public transportation ===
==== Railway and metro ====
Rail transport is provided directly by KTM Komuter via Mid Valley Komuter station on the Batu Caves-Pulau Sebang Line. The KTM station connects directly with the eastern entrance of Mid Valley Megamall.

Mid Valley is also indirectly served by the Kelana Jaya Line and Tanjung Malim-Port Klang Line via the Abdullah Hukum station. Pedestrian access is possible via a walk from the Robinsons store in The Gardens mall, first via a bridge across the Klang River, then through the adjacent KL Eco City development project. A pedestrian bridge from The Gardens mall to Abdullah Hukum station has been constructed, and is opened to public since around 2019.

==== Buses ====
Mid Valley City is a stop for Rapid KL buses routes including 822 (to Bangsar), T788 (to Universiti) and T817 (to Pusat Bandar Damansara).

The Gardens mall also provided shuttle bus services to Mont Kiara (Segambut), but it is restricted to Mont Kiara residents only.

=== Car ===
Mid Valley City is located at the northern end of Jalan Klang Lama.

Jalan Syed Putra, part of the Federal Highway Federal Route 2, runs through the eastern and southern boundary of Mid Valley City, with an exit after the Petron gas station.

== MSC Status ==
Mid Valley City has been awarded MSC Malaysia Cyber Center status since 22 September 2008. Offices in the development offer competitive date center rates and high-speed broadband access.

== Gallery ==
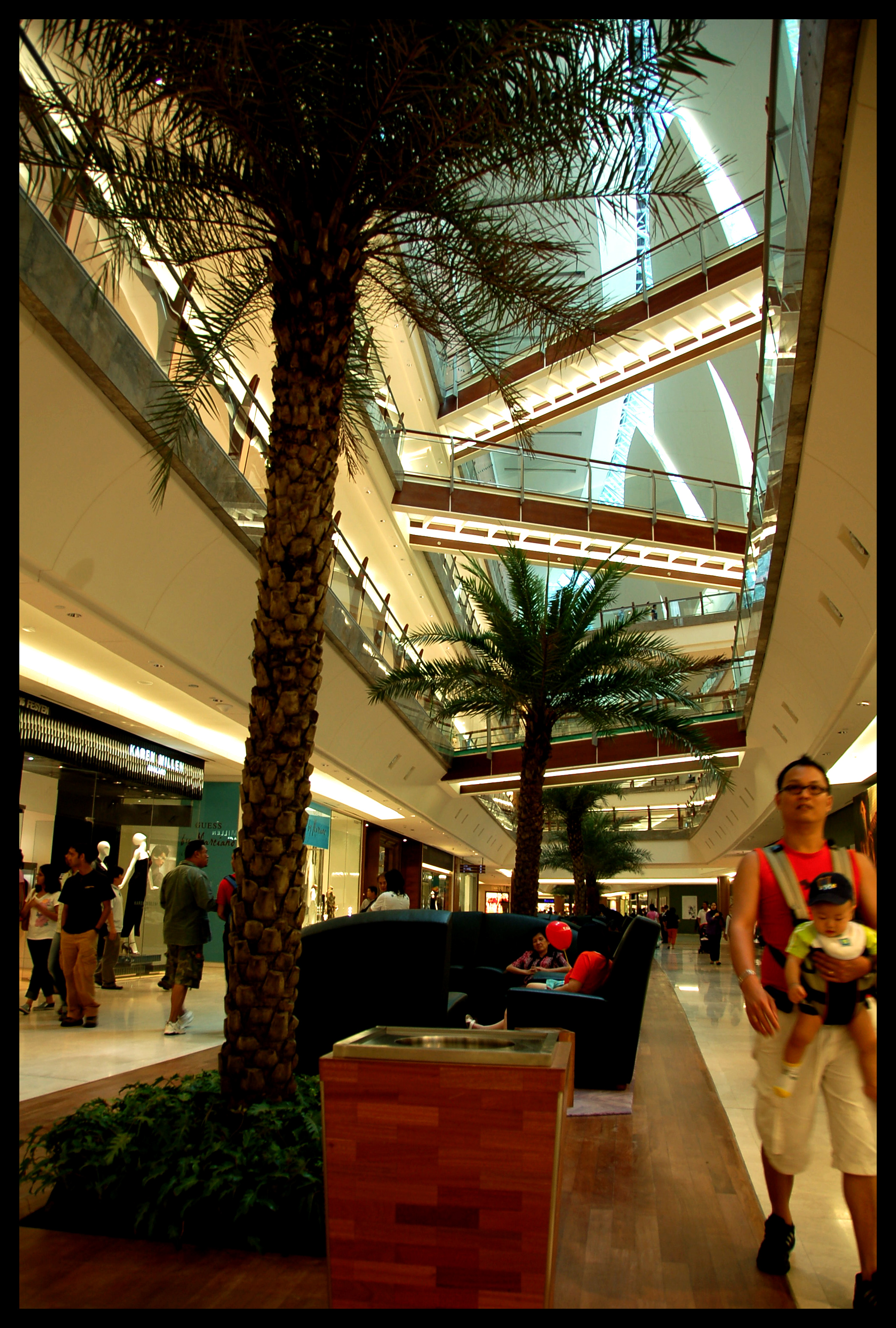
View of the Corridor in the Retail Gallery

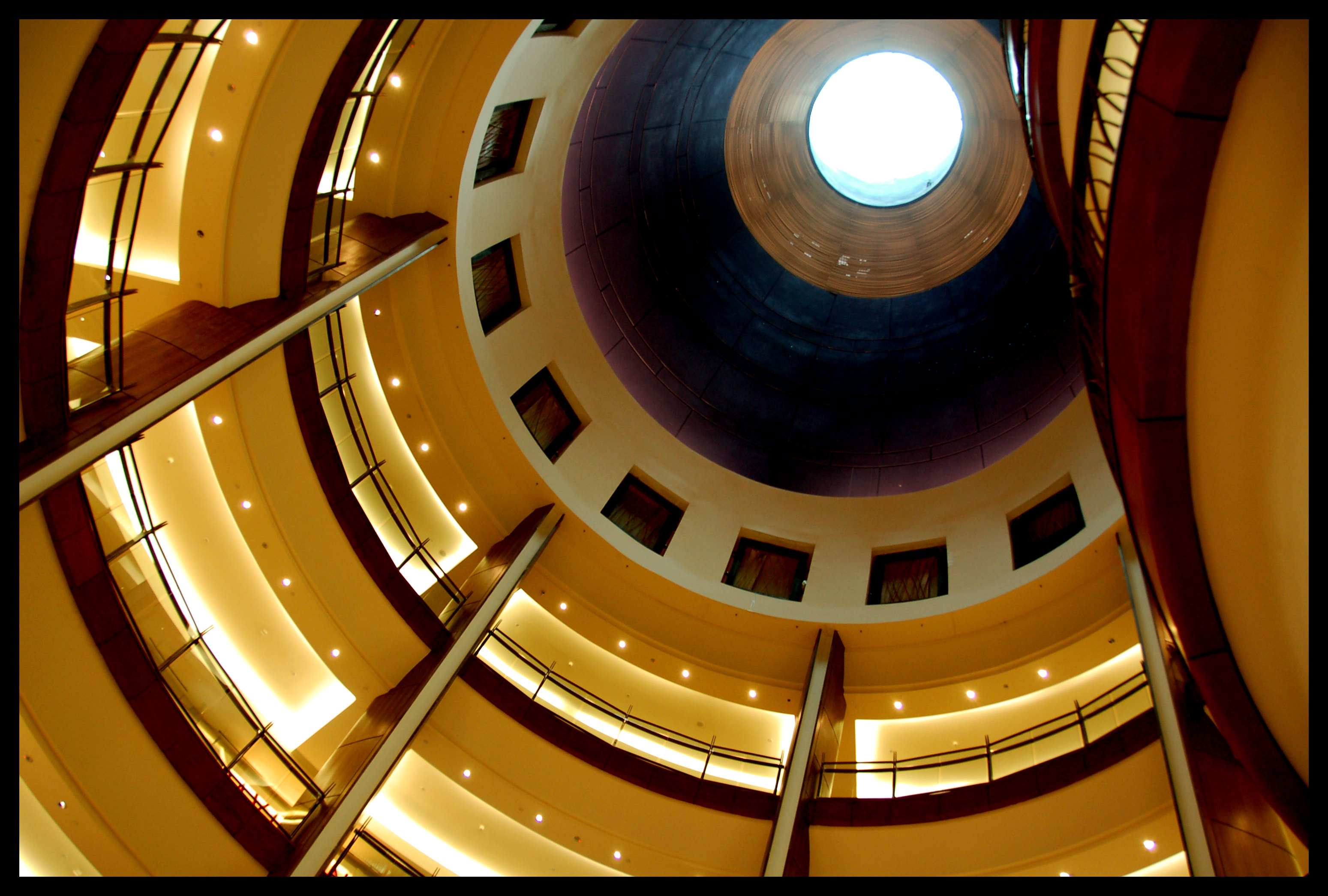
View of the Atrium in front of Robinson

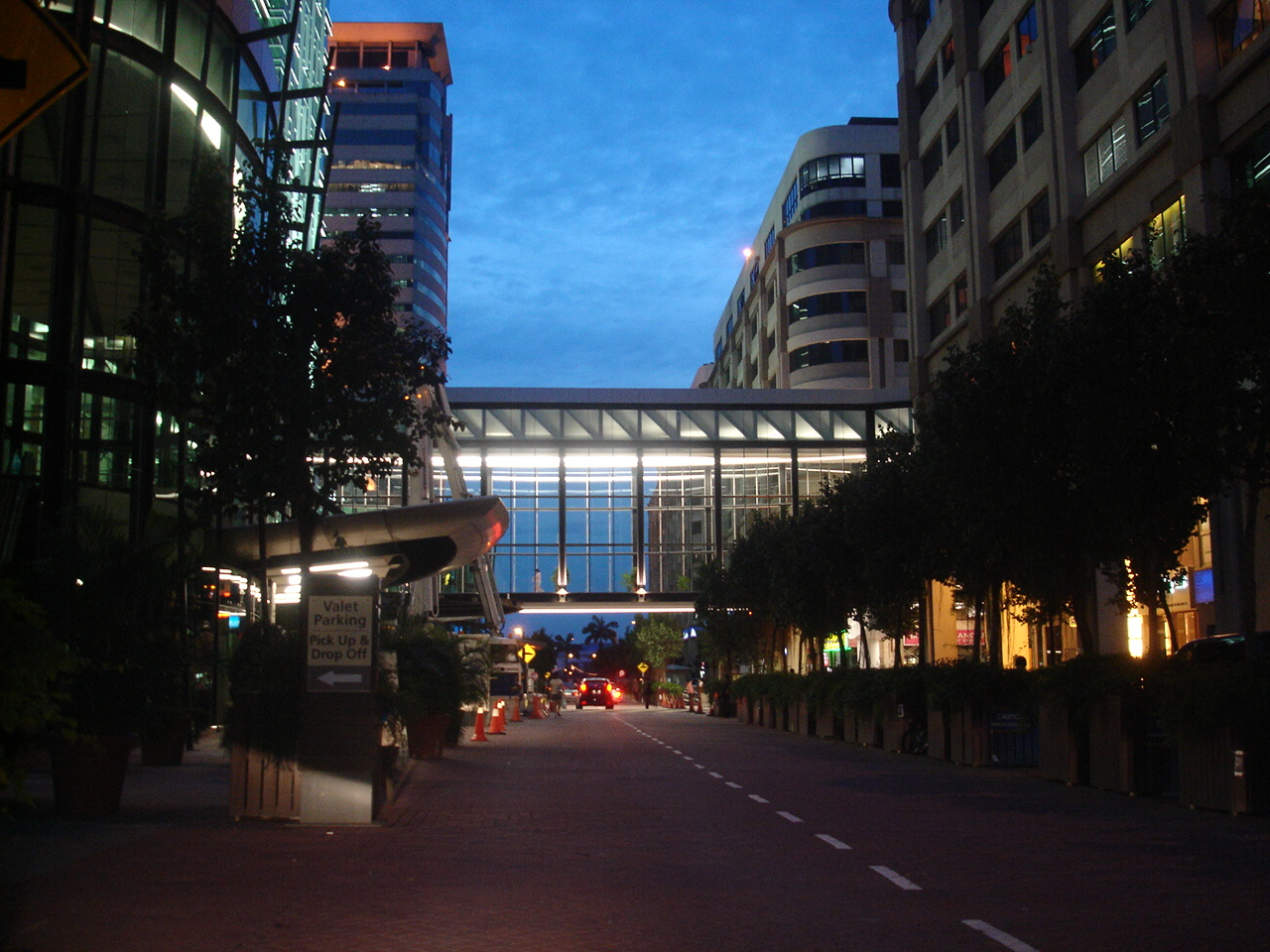
Bridge between Mid Valley Megamall and the Gardens
