= Muzium Negara MRT station =

MRT station in Kuala Lumpur, Malaysia

KG15 Muzium Negara
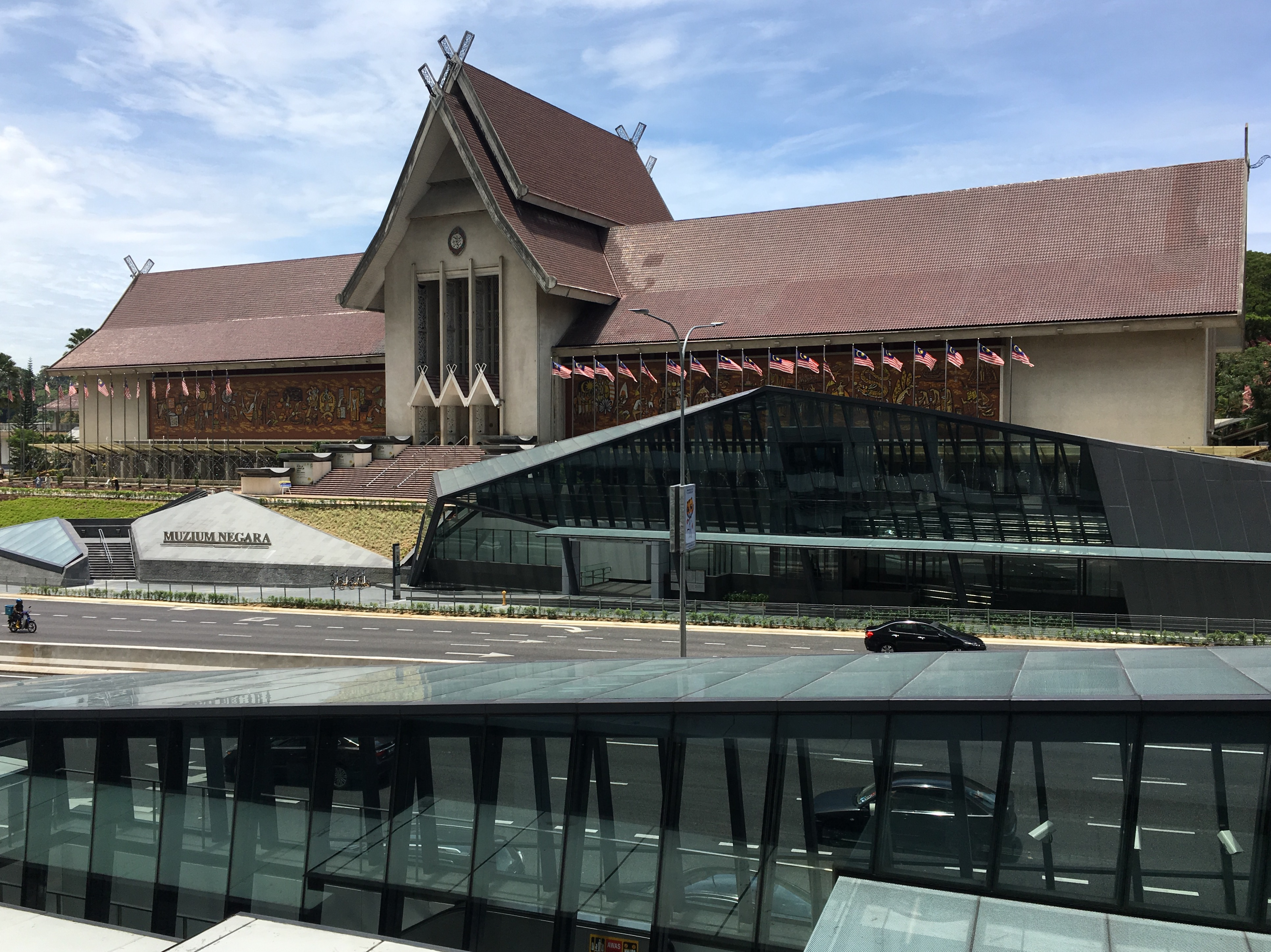
- Station entrance in front of the National Museum

General information
- Other names: Malay: موزيوم نݢارا (Jawi); Chinese: 国家博物馆; Tamil: மியூசியம் நெகாரா
- Location: Jalan Damansara; 50480 Kuala Lumpur; Malaysia
- Coordinates: 3°8′14.34″N 101°41′14.41″E
- System: Rapid KL
- Owner: MRT Corp
- Operator: Rapid Rail
- Line: 9 Kajang Line
- Platforms: 1 island platform
- Tracks: 2
- Connections: Connecting station to KA01 KS01 KJ15 KE1 KT1 MR1 KL Sentral via a 240-metre linkway.

Construction
- Structure type: Underground
- Depth: 25.5 metres (84 ft)
- Parking: Available at KL Sentral
- Cycle facilities: Not available

Other information
- Station code: KG15

History
- Opened: 17 July 2017
- Former names: KL Sentral

Services
Preceding station		Following station
Semantan towards Kwasa Damansara	Kajang Line	Pasar Seni towards Kajang
Location

The Muzium Negara MRT station is an underground mass rapid transit (MRT) station in Kuala Lumpur, Malaysia on the MRT Kajang Line. It is located beneath Jalan Damansara in front of the National Museum (Malay: Muzium Negara), which gave the station its name.

Although located near Kuala Lumpur Sentral (KL Sentral) development, it is not part of the complex. It is however, linked via a 240-metre covered pedestrian walkway to KL Sentral station. For this reason, the working name given to the station during the planning stage, which was "KL Sentral station", was not adopted.

== Station features ==
=== Location ===
The station is located beneath Jalan Damansara to the southwest of the historical city centre of Kuala Lumpur. It is located to the north of and adjacent to, but not within, the KL Sentral development. To the north of the station is the National Museum of Malaysia, while the nearest buildings to the south of the station are Menara CIMB, Q Sentral and the St Regis Kuala Lumpur, which are part of the KL Sentral development.

=== Station layout ===
L1	Muzium Negara Level	Lift to entrance B Street level and level B2 unpaid area
G	Street Level	Entrance A and Entrance B on both sides of Jalan Damansara; Taxi lay-by; Park and ride lay-by
B2	Concourse	Ticket vending machines; customer service office; fare gates; Entrance C (pedestrian link to KL Sentral) from paid area
B3	Platform Level	Platform 1: 9 Kajang Line towards KG35 Kajang (→)
B3	Platform Level	Island platform
B3	Platform Level	Platform 2: 9 Kajang Line towards KG04 Kwasa Damansara (←)

=== Entrances and exits ===
The station has 3 entrances/exits, of which 2 lead to both sides of Jalan Damansara while the last one connects to the pedestrian linkway which leads to the KL Sentral station and other buildings in the KL Sentral development. Entrance B, which is the main entrance, is located directly in front of the National Museum.

The KL Sentral-Muzium Negara MRT station pedestrian link leads directly to the station's paid area and does not allow any passing through to access the National Museum from KL Sentral. To access the Muzium Negara from KL Sentral, pedestrians would be required to use Entrance A of the MRT station by walking through Q Sentral, then go through the unpaid area of the station and exit at Entrance B to get to the museum's main entrance. The reverse applies for pedestrians going from the National Museum to KL Sentral.

Kajang Line station
Entrance	Location	Destination	Picture
A	South side of Jalan Damansara	The St Regis Kuala Lumpur, Menara CIMB	
B	North side of Jalan Damansara	National Museum, Malay World Ethnology Museum, Museums Department of Malaysia, Perdana Botanical Gardens, The Majestic Hotel Kuala Lumpur	
C	Linkway to KL Sentral	KL Sentral Station, Hilton Kuala Lumpur, Le Meridien Kuala Lumpur, Q Sentral, Menara CIMB, Platinum Sentral, NU Sentral	

=== Link to Kuala Lumpur Sentral station ===
Commuters transferring between the Muzium Negara MRT station and KL Sentral transport hub are required to walk through a 240-metre pedestrian link, which is partially elevated and underground. The link was constructed by Malaysian Resources Corporation Berhad (MRCB) for RM50 million.

From the MRT station, the pedestrian link begins after the fare gates at Entrance C, where there are three flights of escalators which bring pedestrians to an elevated walkway above Jalan Stesen Sentral 5. The walkway is connected to various buildings such as Q Sentral, Menara CIMB, Le Meredian Hotel, Hilton Hotel and Platinum Sentral. The walkway also leads to the main KL Sentral station building, where an escalator brings users to the KLIA Ekspres arrival hall.

In addition to constructing the new pedestrian link, renovations to cater to the increased passenger volume were also carried out at KL Sentral, such as widening the walkway between the KLIA Ekspres arrival hall and the main transit concourse by removing the retail outlets that used to line the walkway. Additional signage was also installed.

At KL Sentral station, commuters can connect to the Batu Caves–Pulau Sebang Line, Tanjung Malim–Port Klang Line, Kelana Jaya Line, KLIA Ekspres, KLIA Transit, and KL Sentral-Terminal Skypark Line. Commuters are also able to connect to the KL Monorail by walking through the NU Sentral Mall connected to KL Sentral.

As the pedestrian walkway links directly to the paid area of the MRT station, it does not allow any walk-through access for those from KL Sentral walking to the National Museum itself or vice versa. Pedestrians from KL Sentral headed to the museum should use the pedestrian link to head to Q Sentral, exit to the lower ground level to access Entrance A of the MRT station behind the building, cross under Jalan Damansara via the unpaid area of the station, and access the Muzium Negara via Entrance B of the station.

=== Interior design ===
Similar to Pasar Seni and Bukit Bintang stations, the exterior of the above-ground station entrances is influenced by quartz crystals found at Bukit Tabur quartz range in Gombak, Selangor, just outside the northeastern limits of Kuala Lumpur.

As with the other underground stations of the MRT Kajang Line, the Muzium Negara MRT station was given a unique interior design theme, which was the History of public transportation in Kuala Lumpur, in view of its proximity to the National Museum.

== Gallery ==
=== Station ===
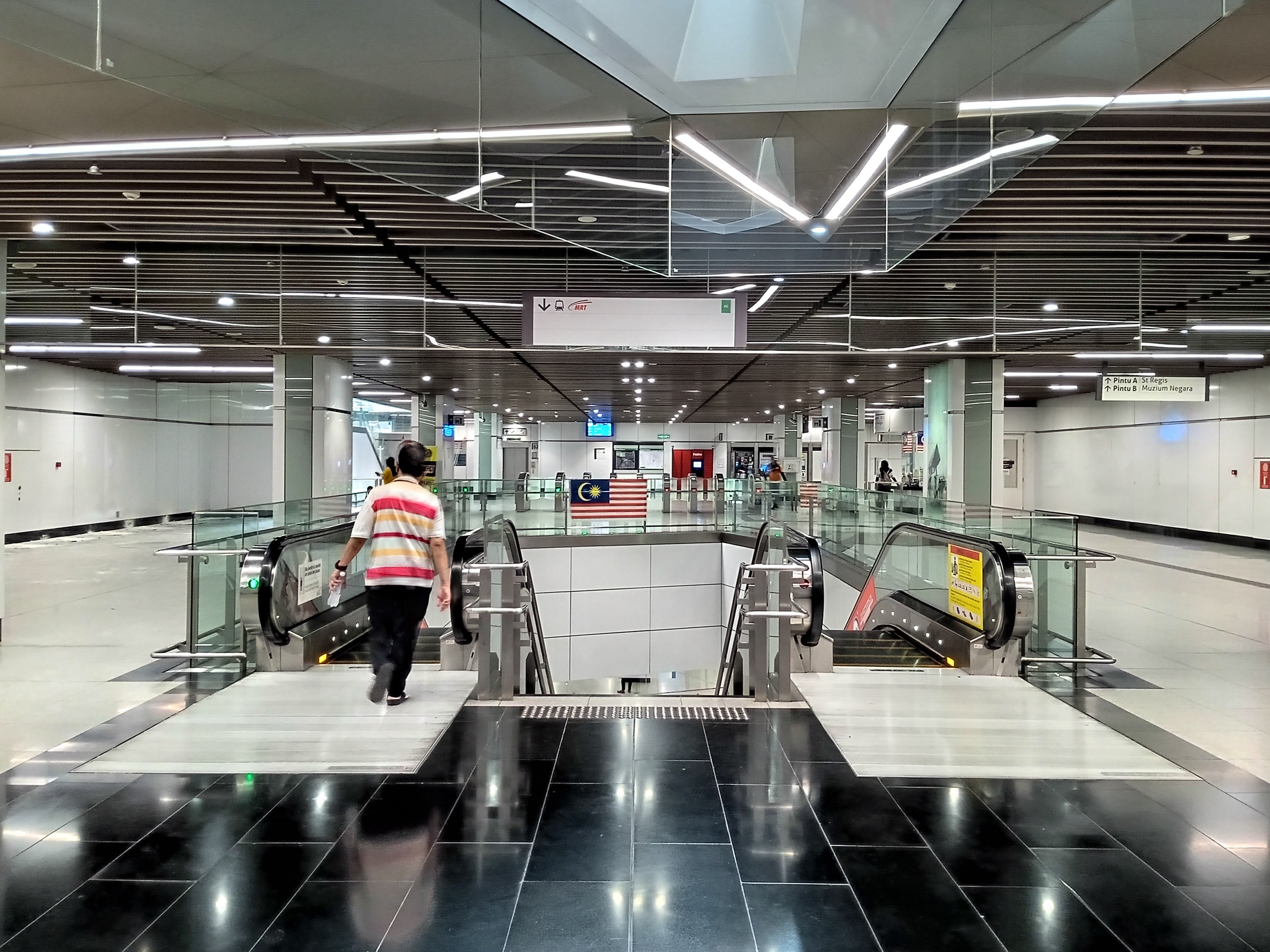
Escalators from the concourse level to platform level of the station

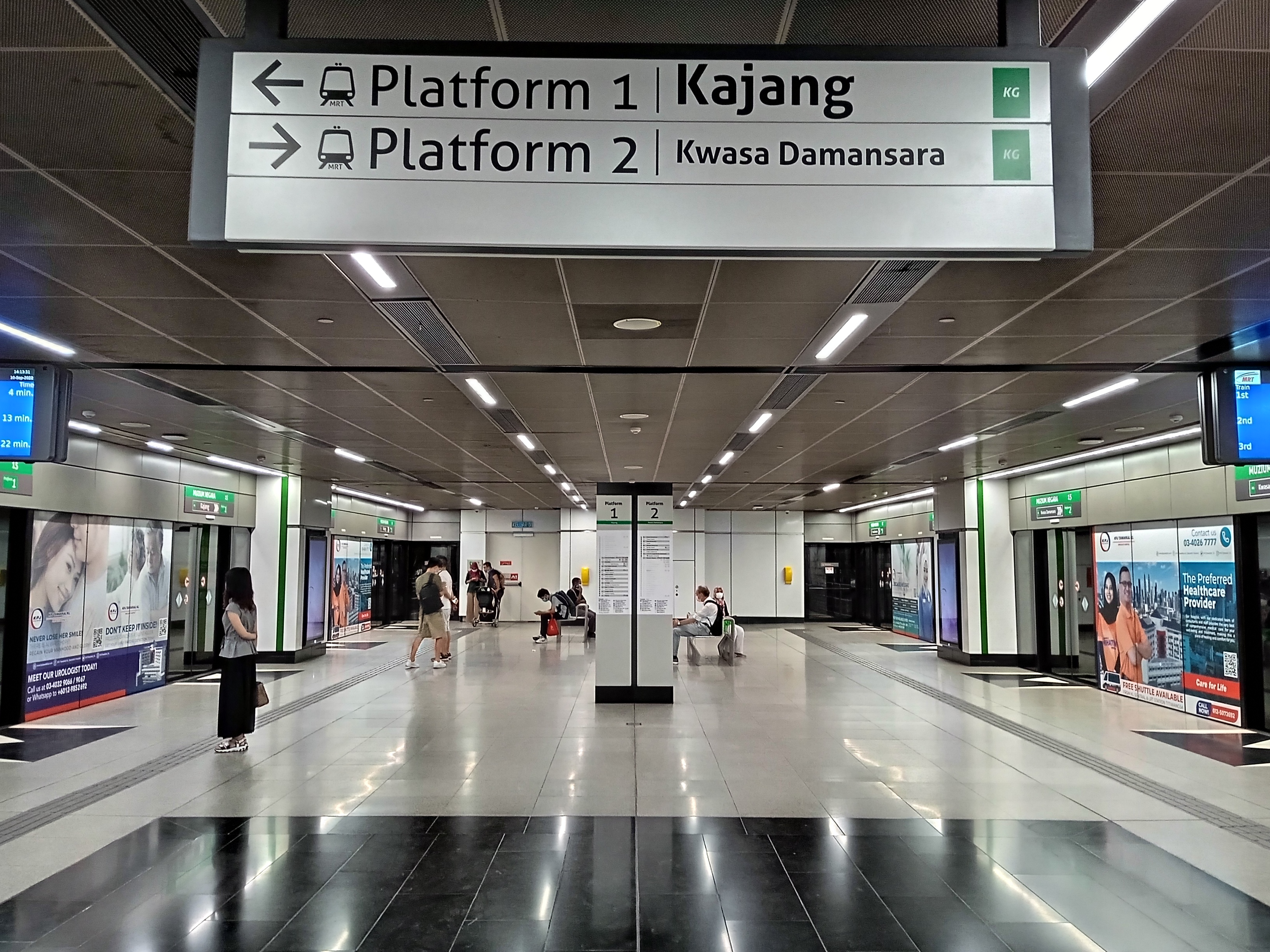
Platform level of the station

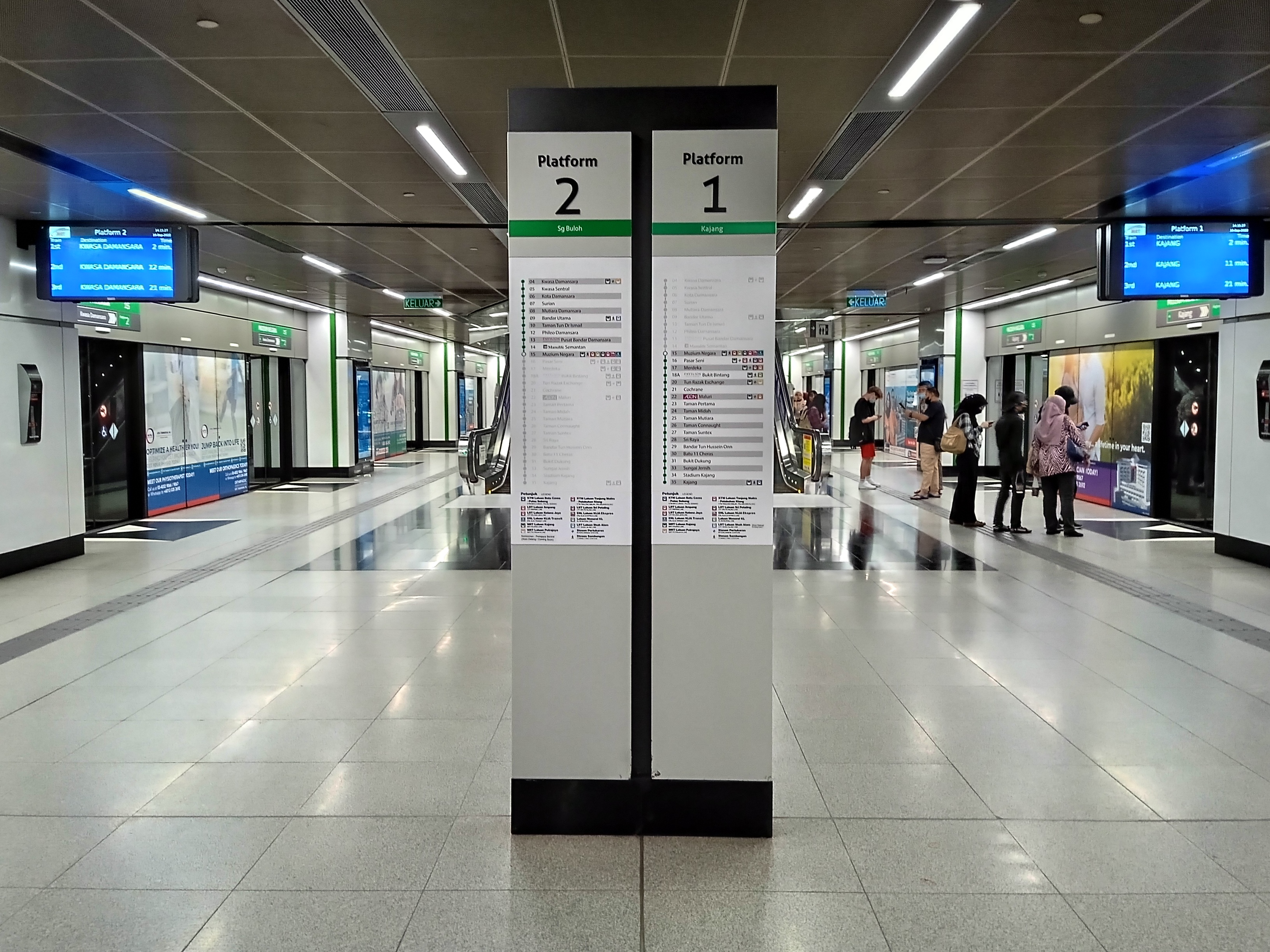
Platform level of the station

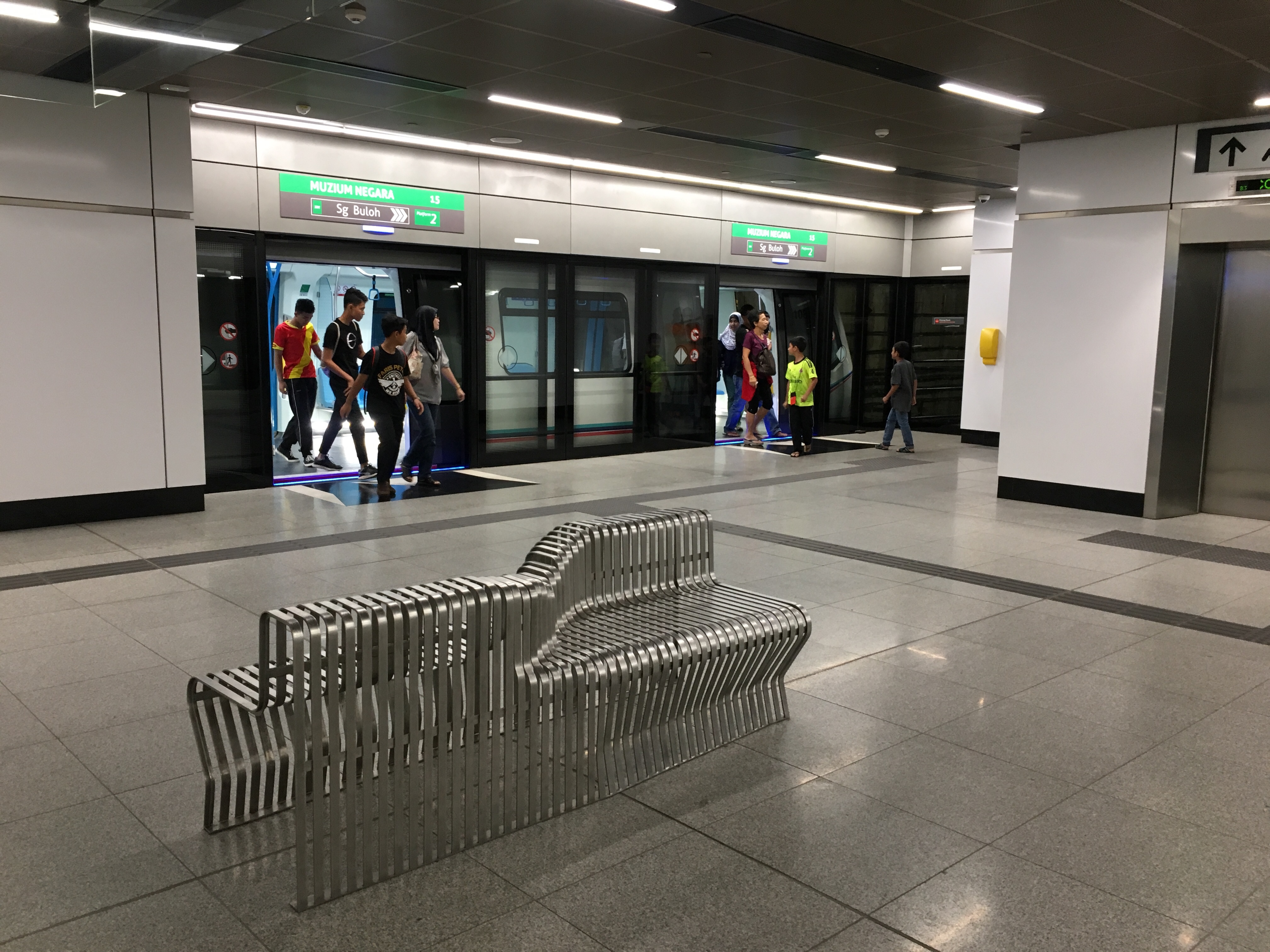
Benches at the station which are designed by student Mohd Saiful Anuar Zamri from Politeknik Sultan Ahmad Shah

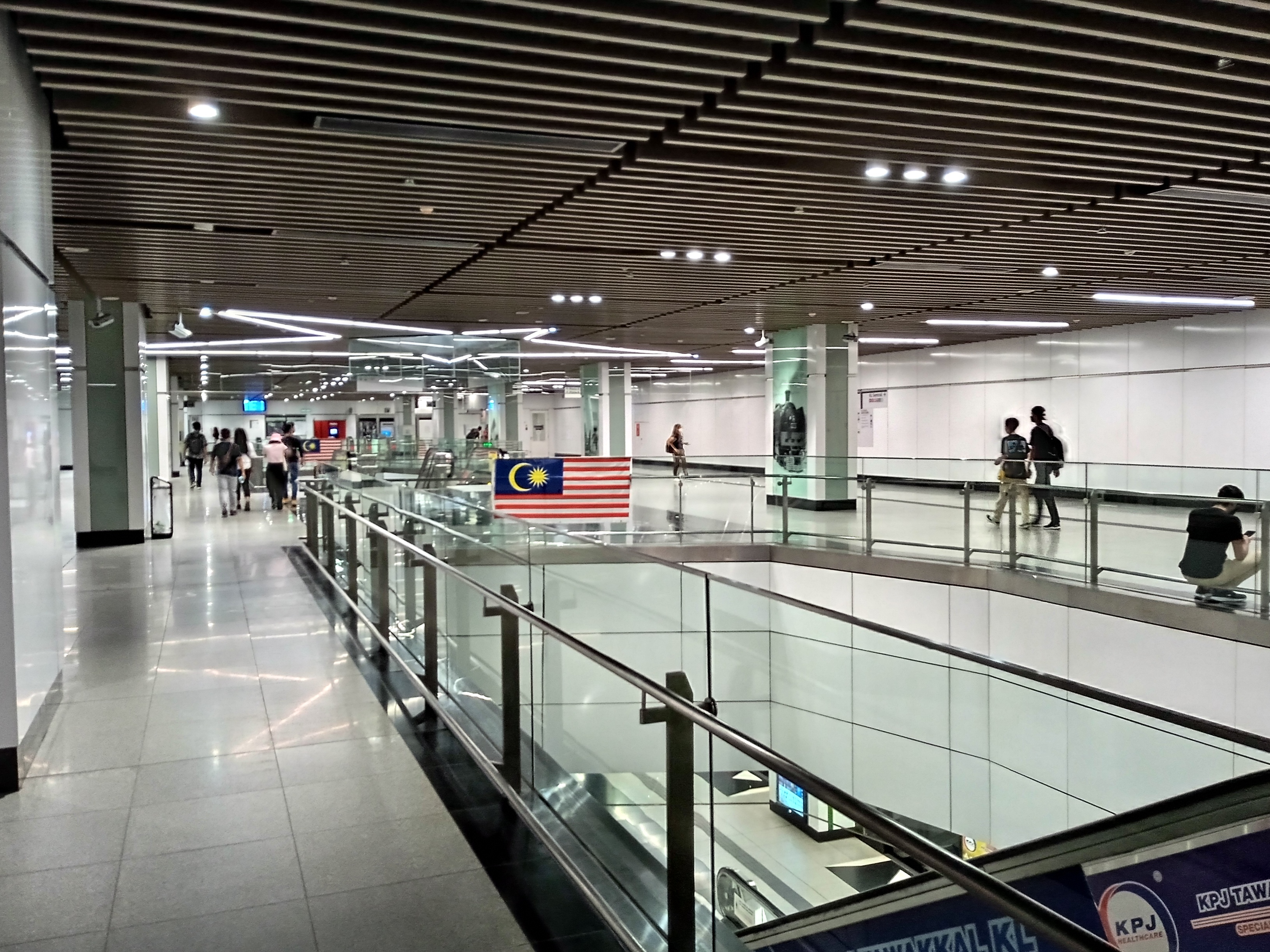
View of the concourse level of the station

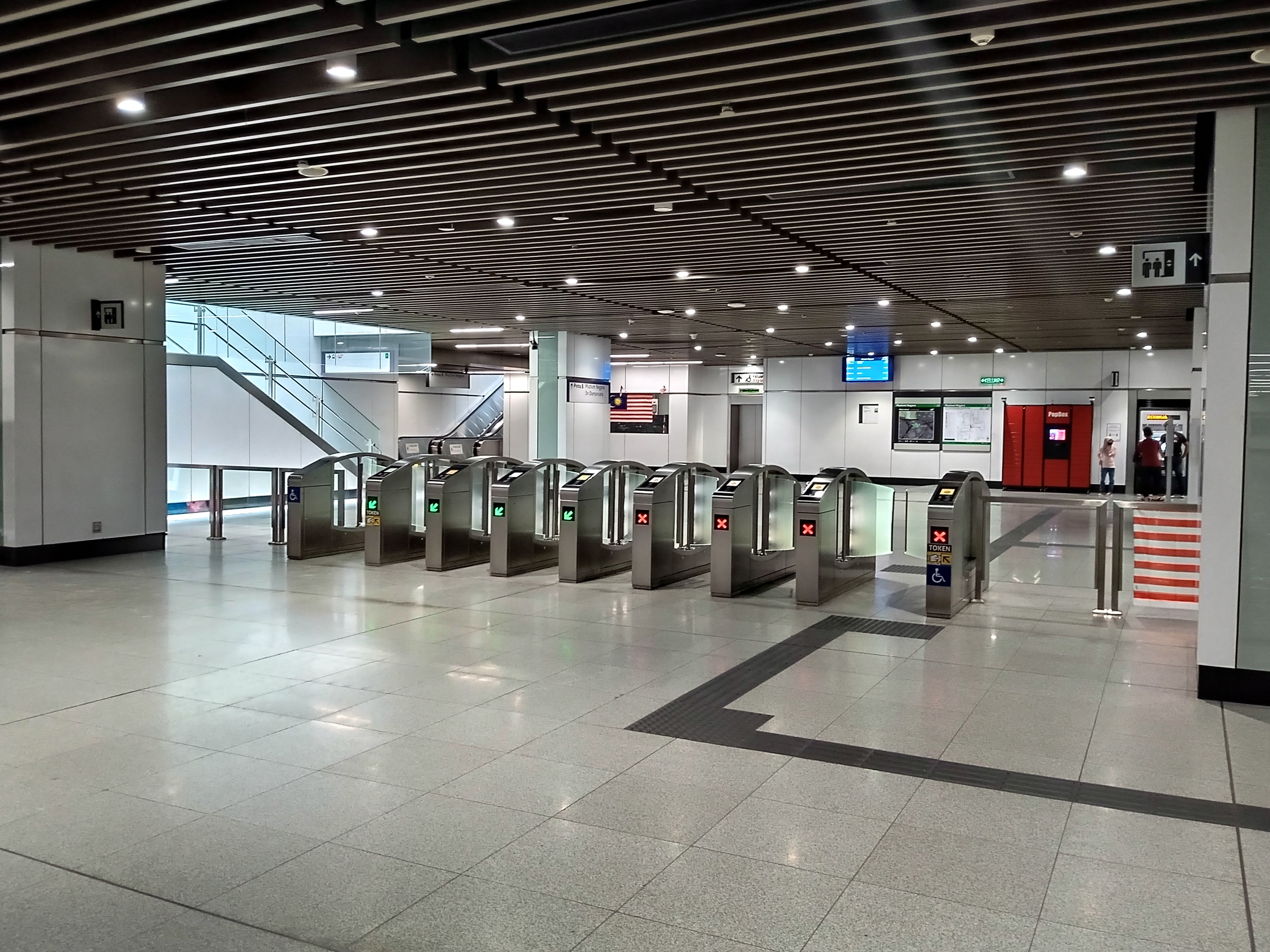
Faregates at the concourse level of the station

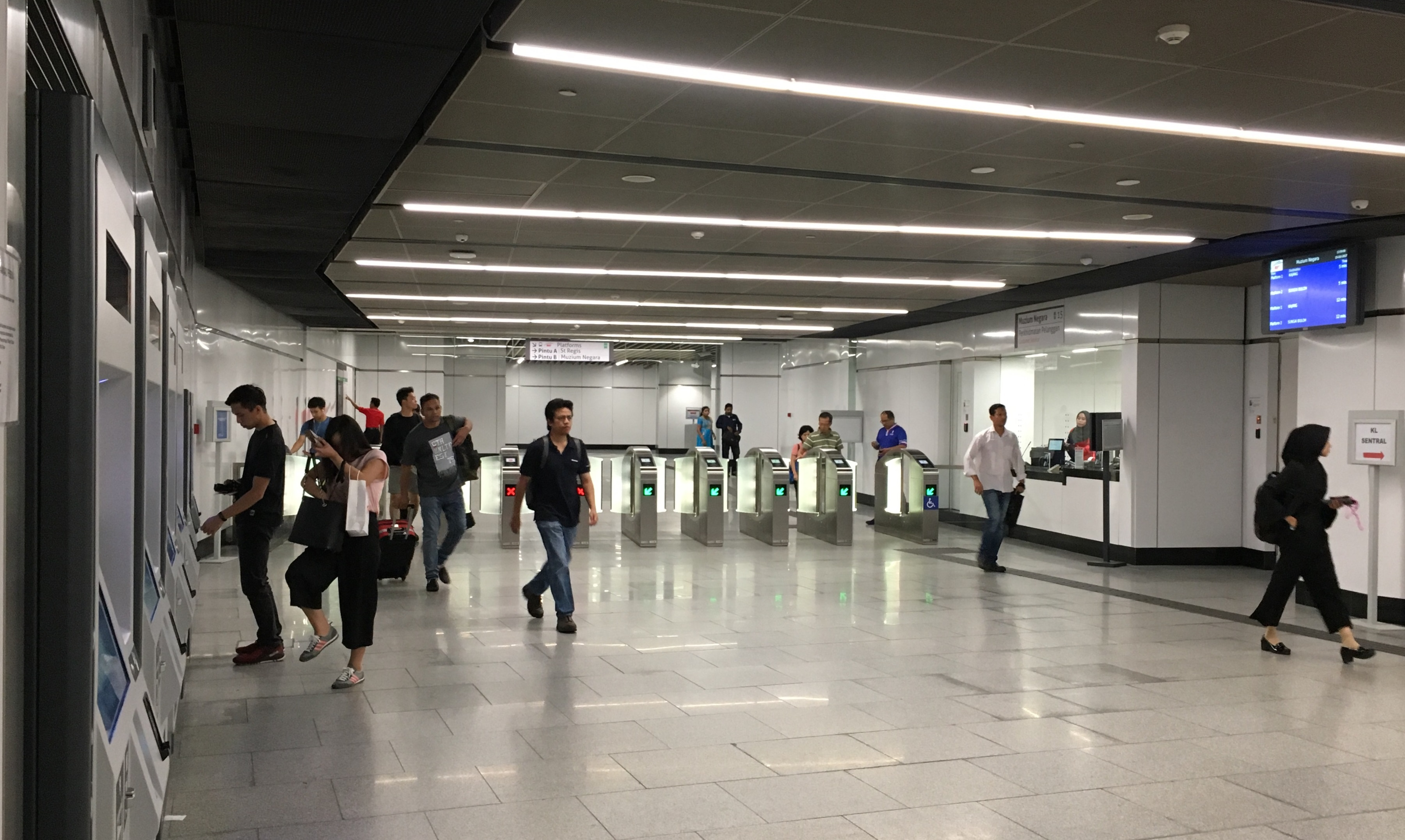
Faregates at Entrance C of the station, which connects to the KL Sentral pedestrian link

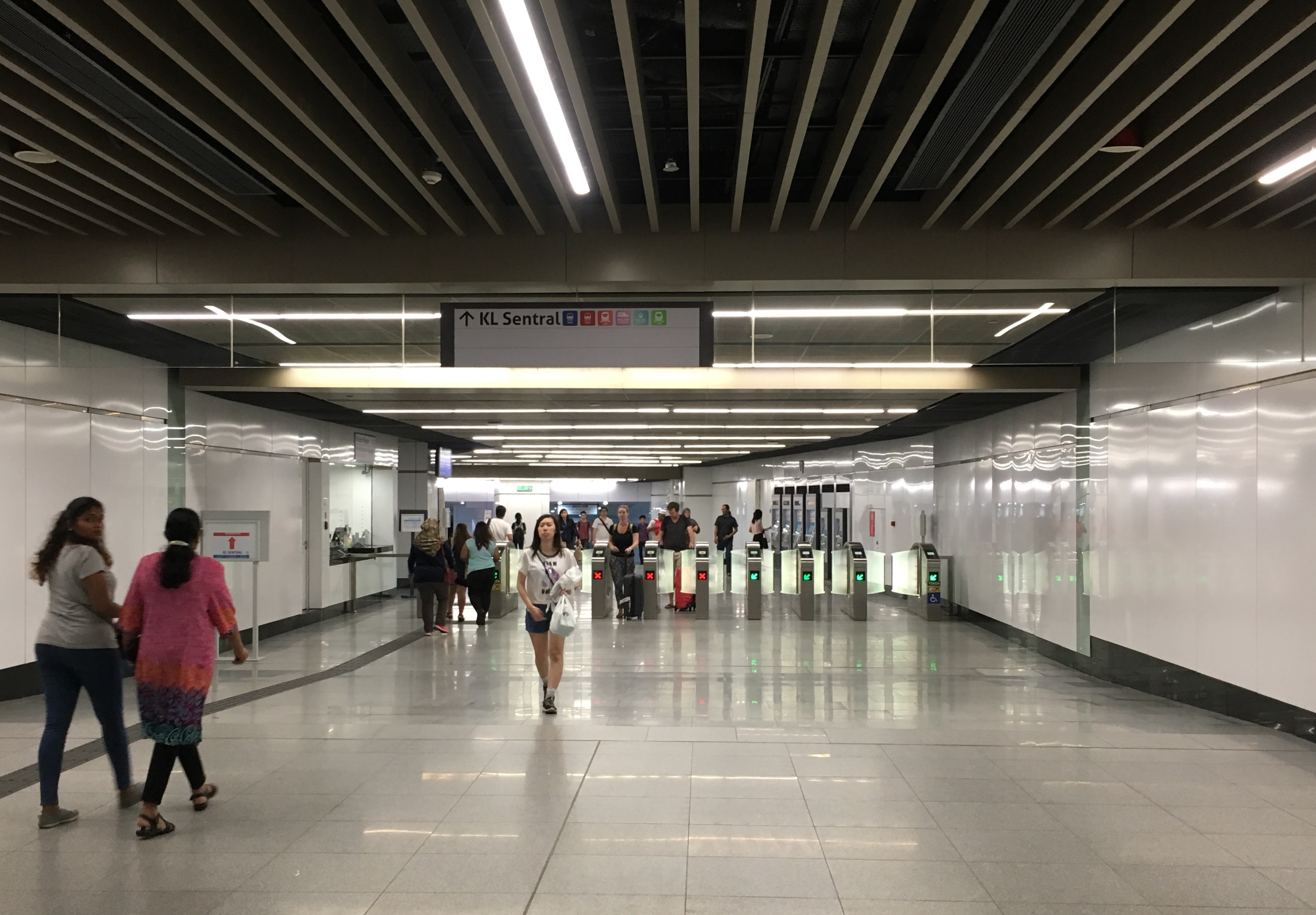
Faregates at Entrance C of the station looking towards the KL Sentral pedestrian link

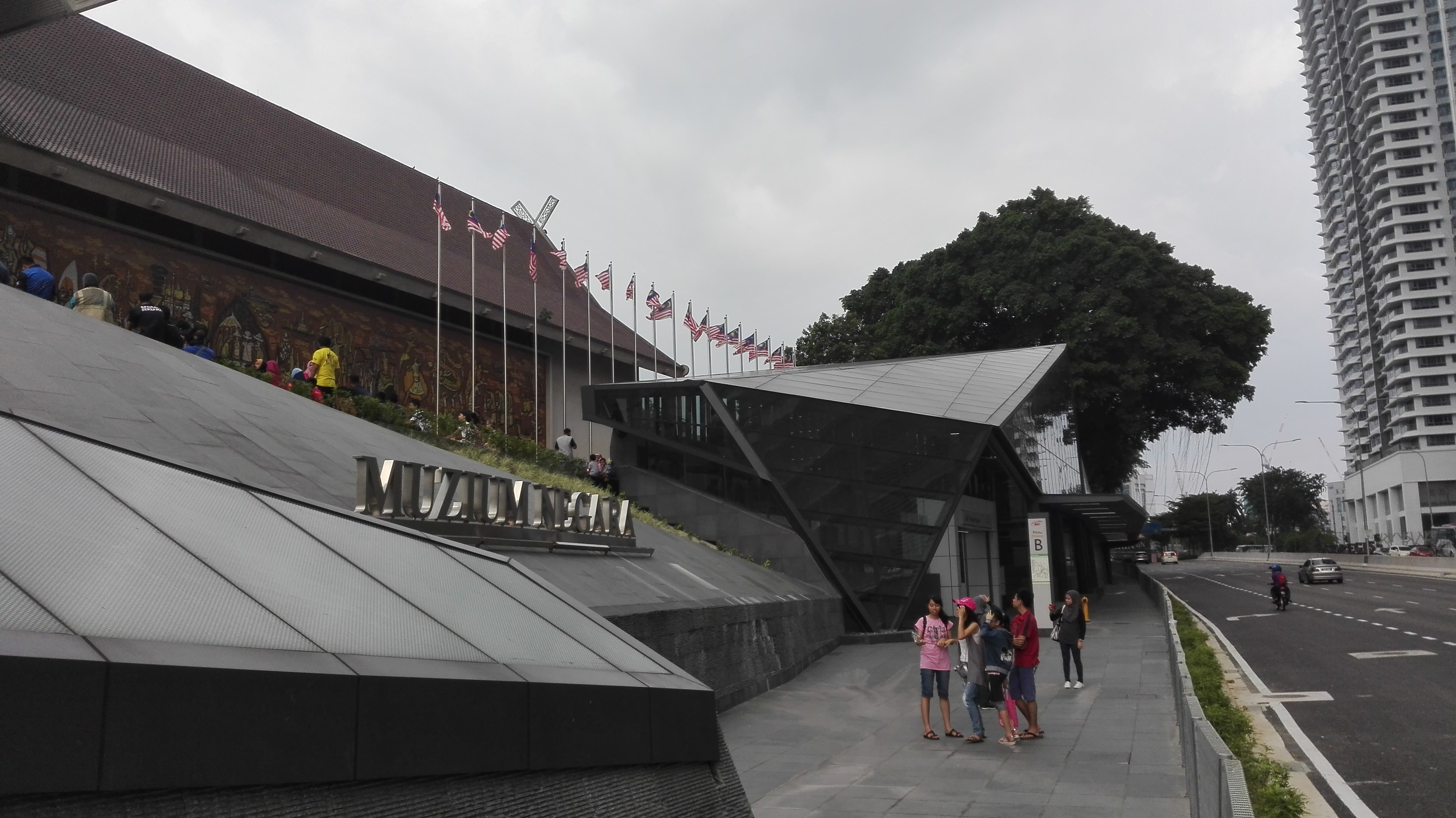
Entrance B of the station in front of the National Museum

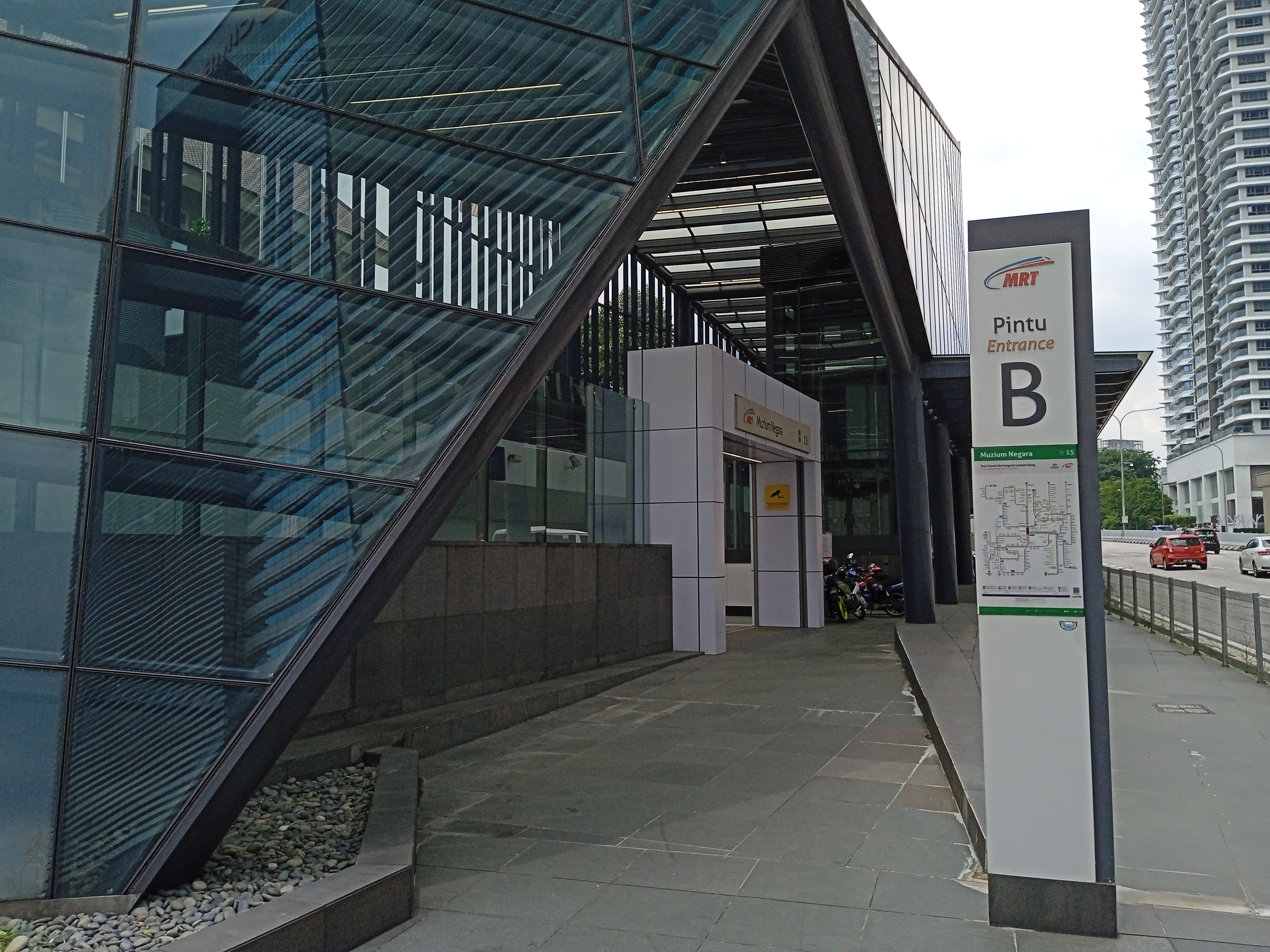
Close up of Entrance B on the north side of Jalan Damansara

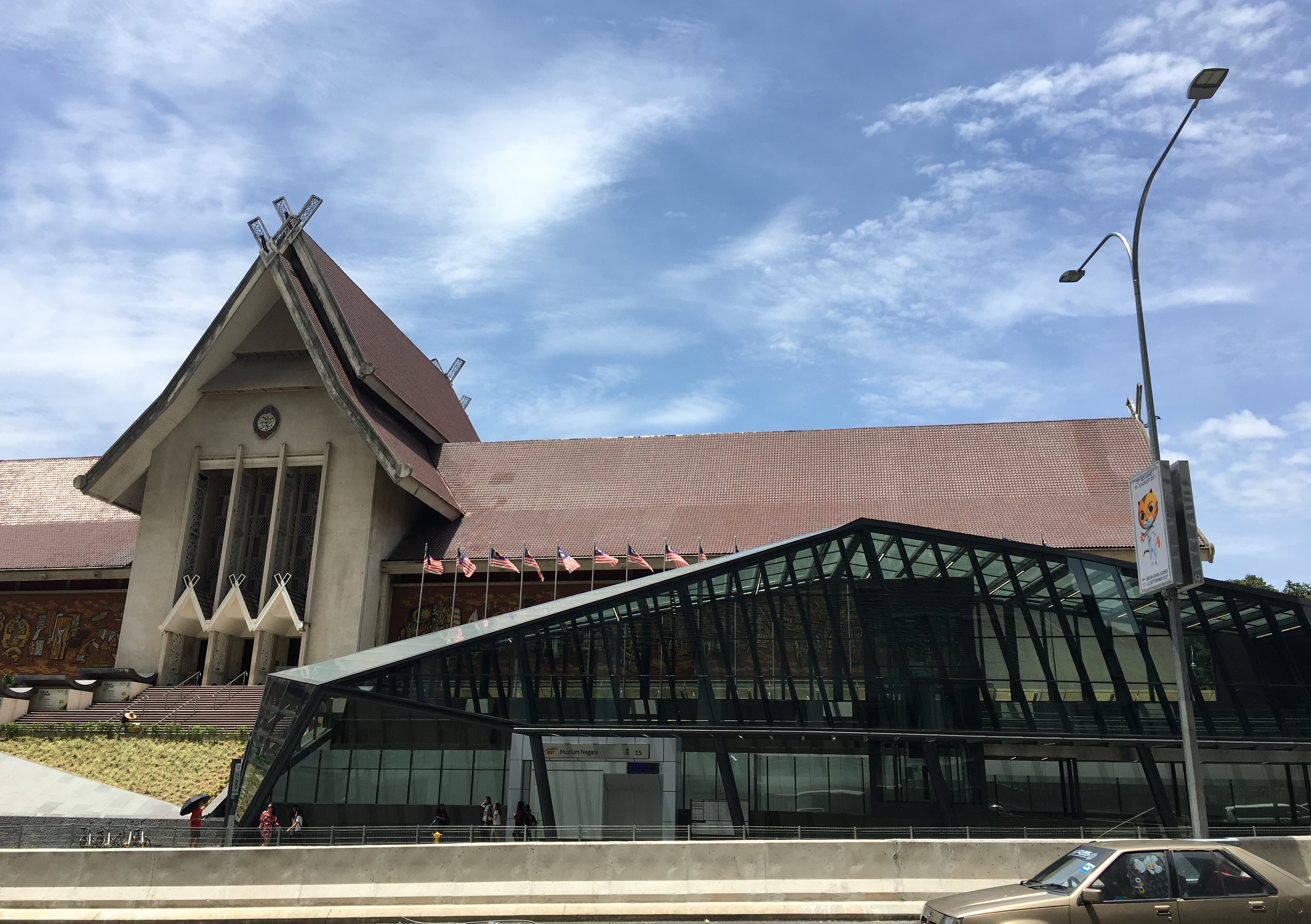
Entrance B in front of the National Museum

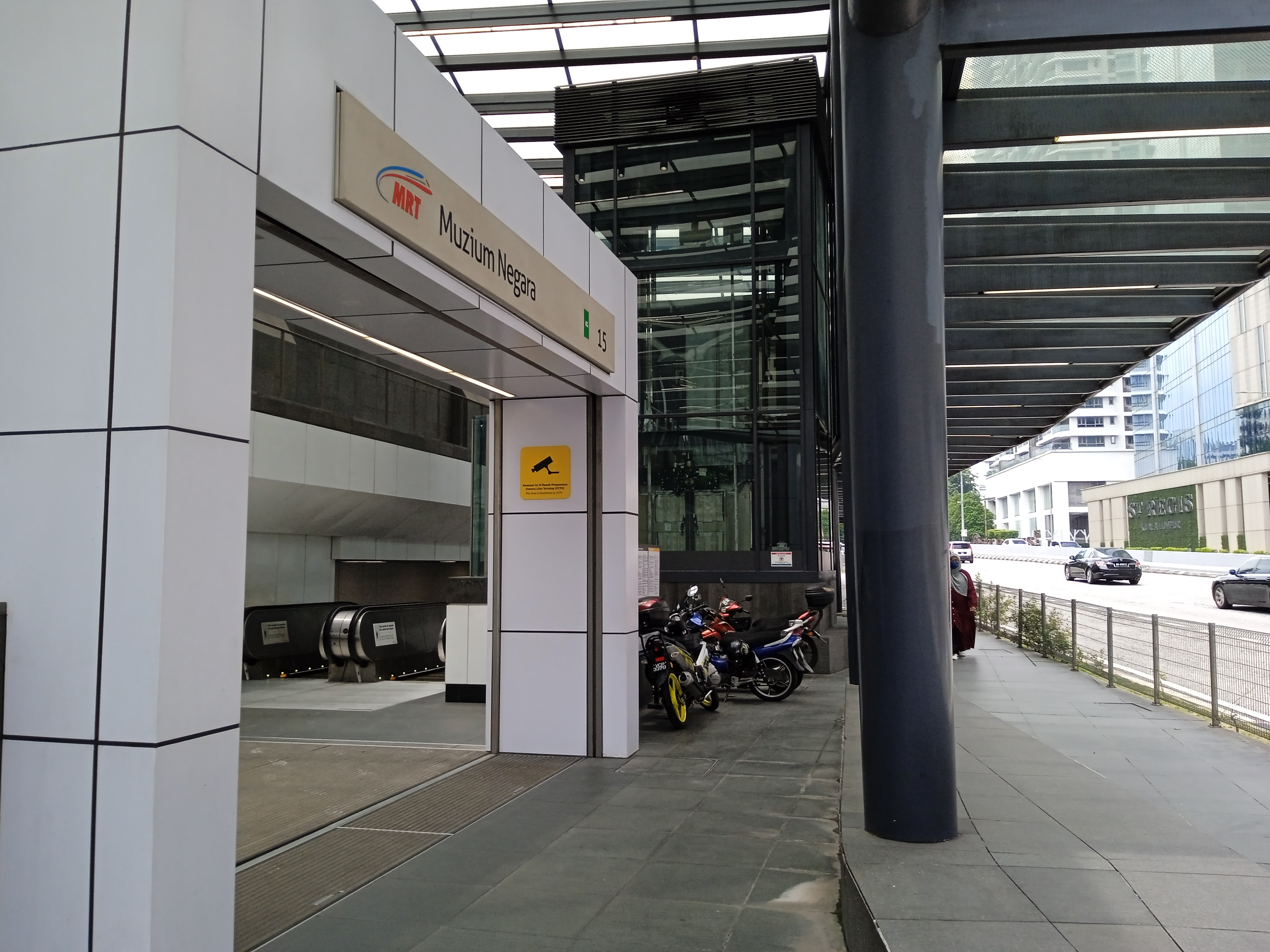
Entrance B with the National Museum seen through the glass roof

Lift at Entrance B allows access directly to the National Museum

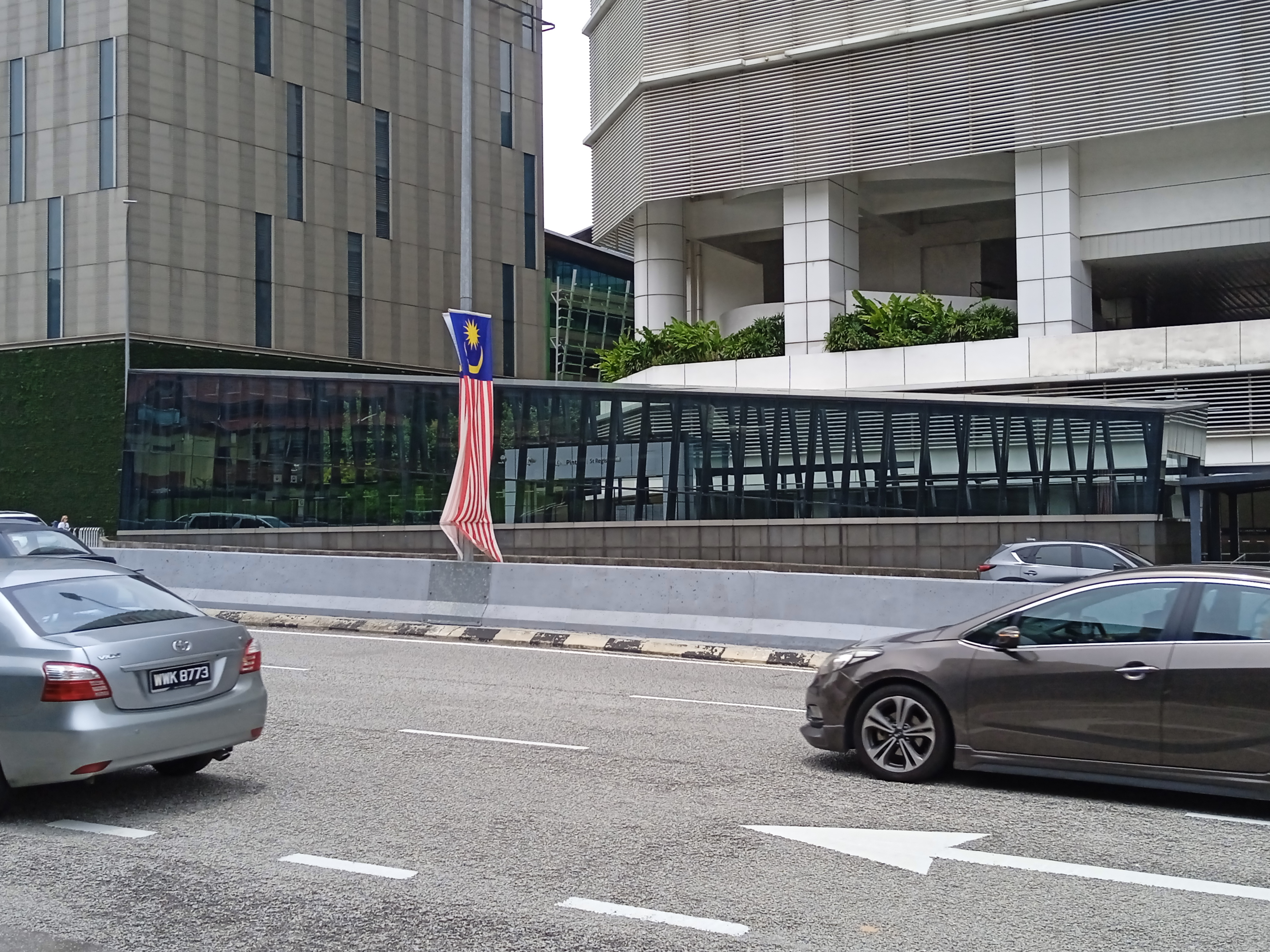
Entrance A on the south side of Jalan Damansara

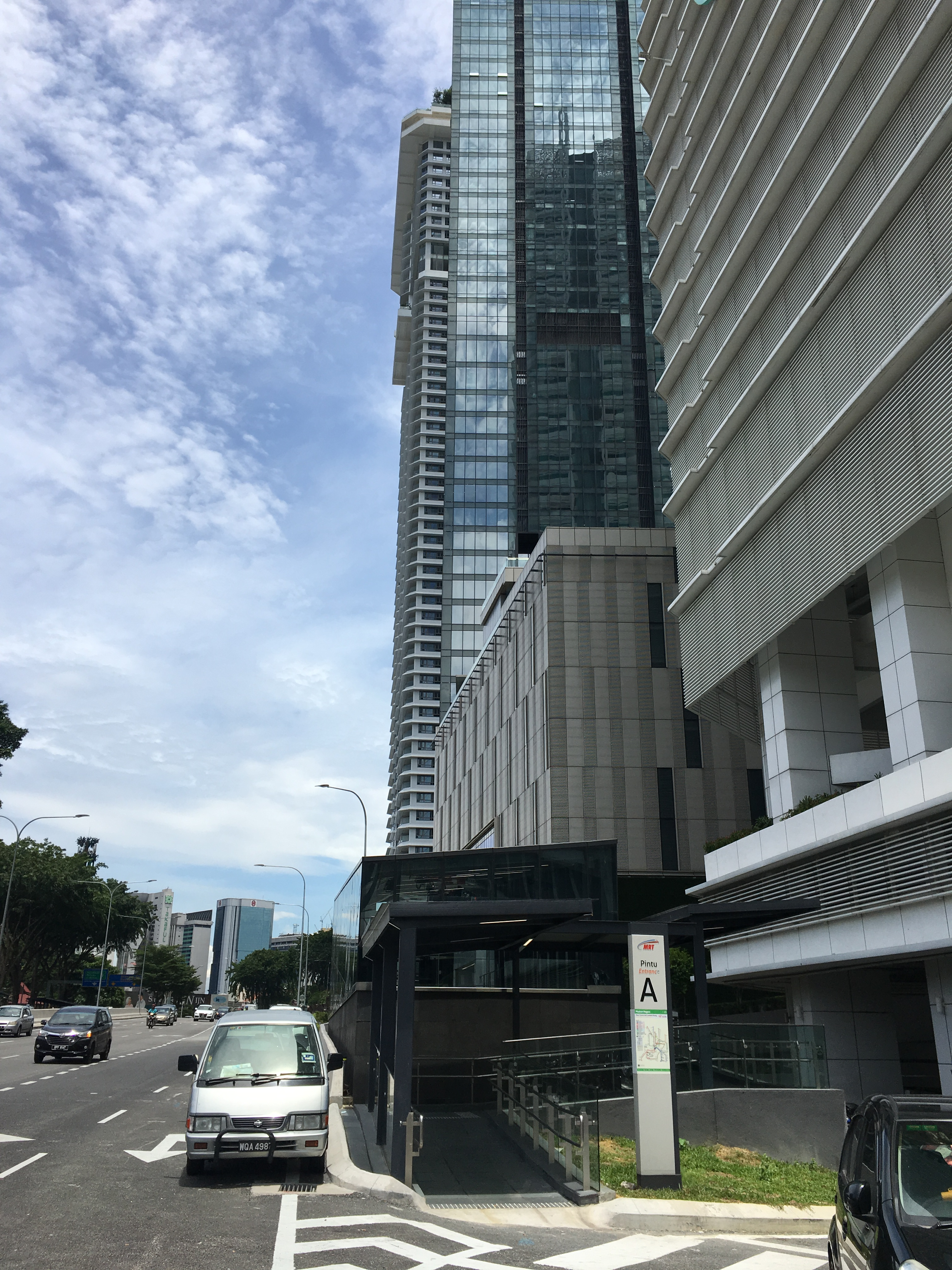
Entrance A is located near Menara CIMB and St Regis Kuala Lumpur

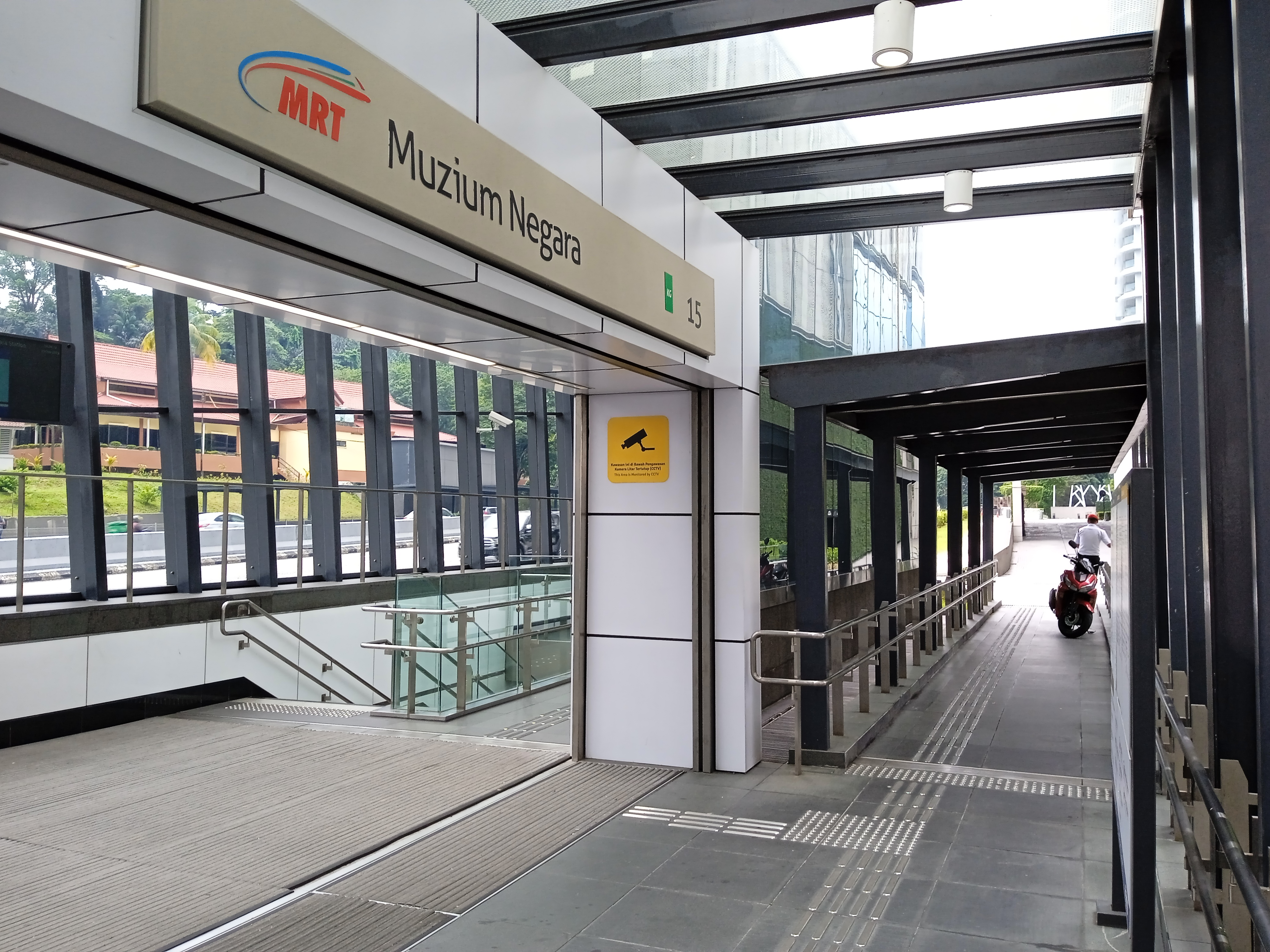
Close up of Entrance A

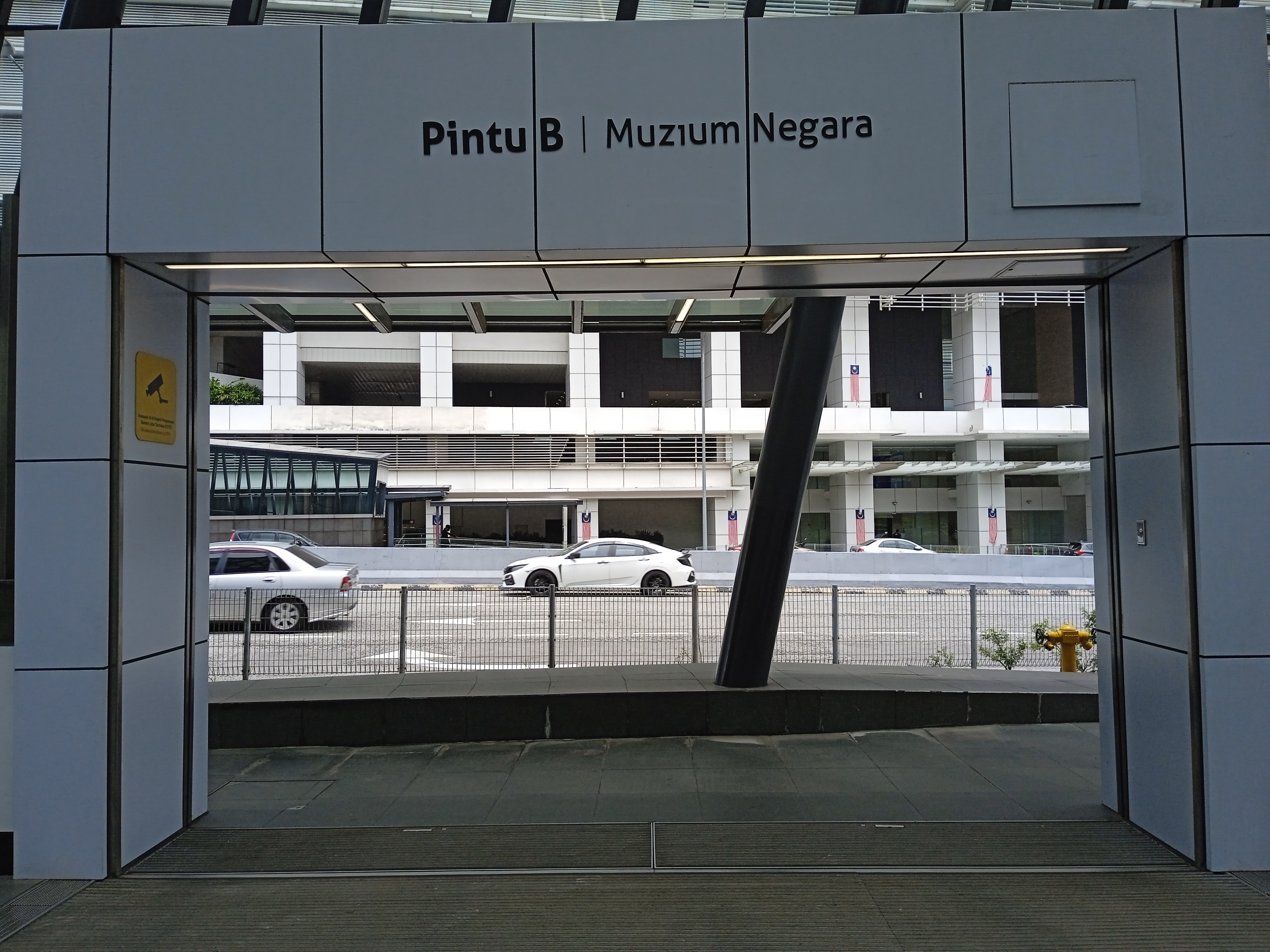
Looking out of Entrance B

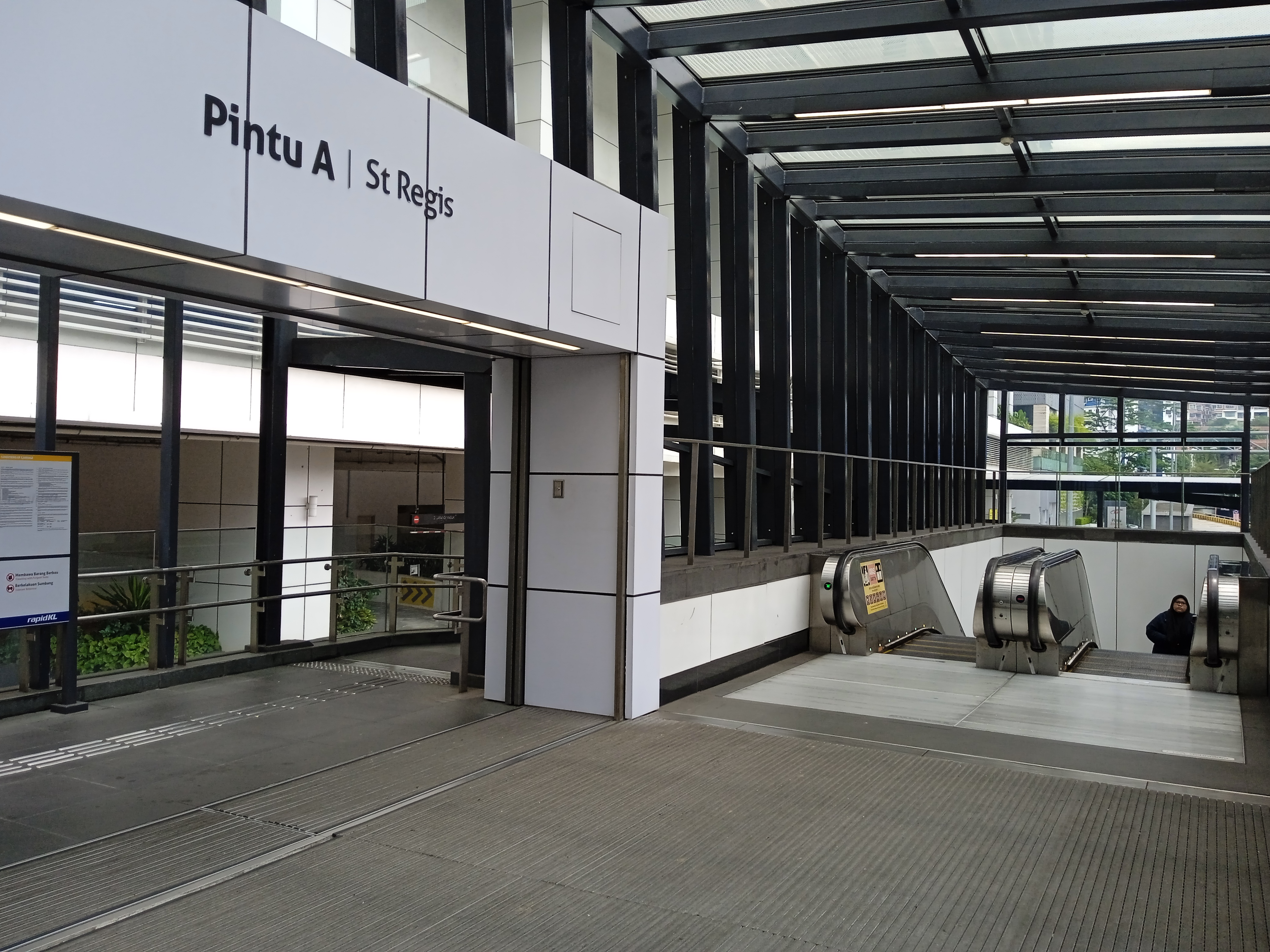
Looking out of Entrance A

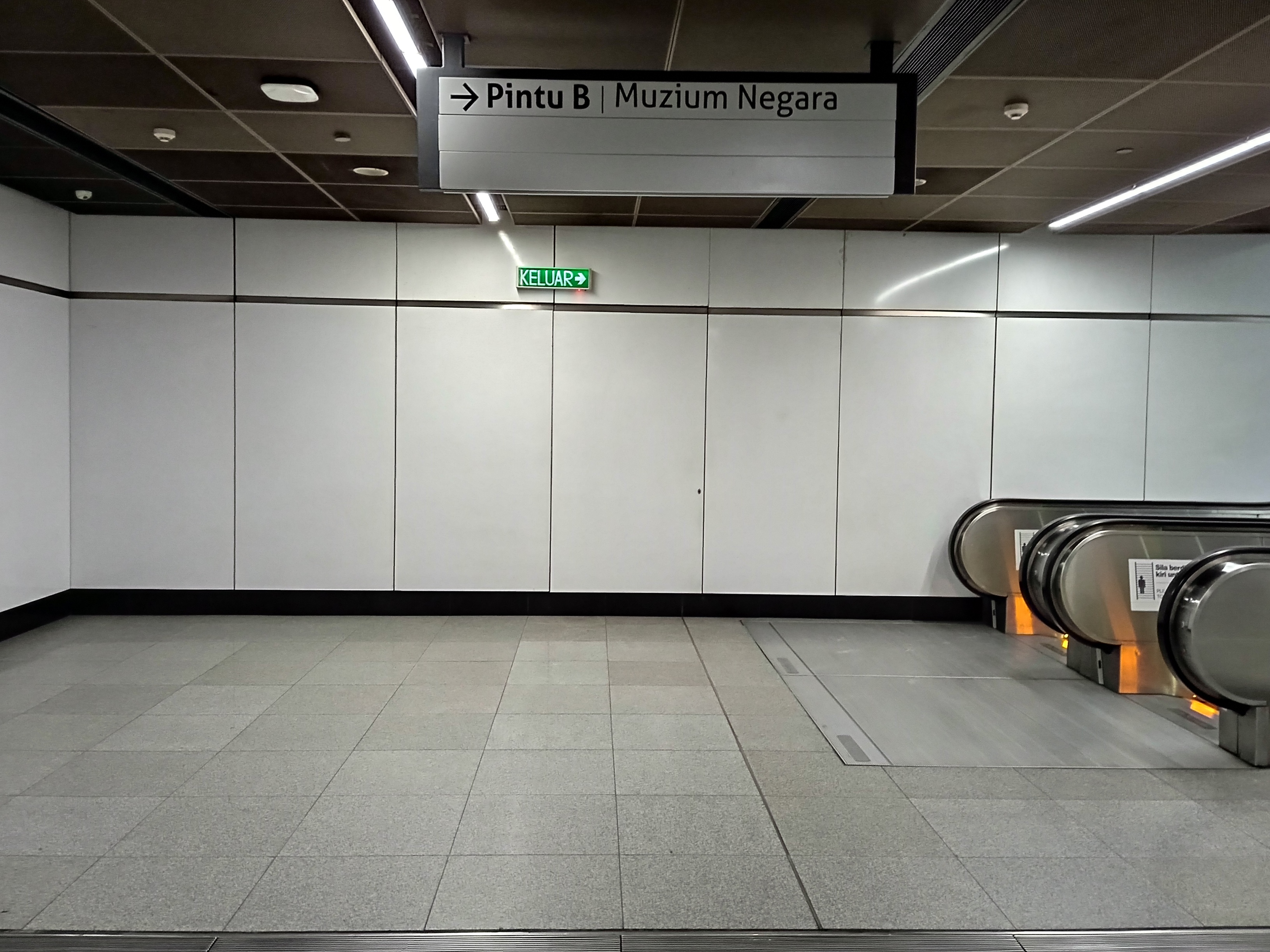
Entrance B from the concourse level

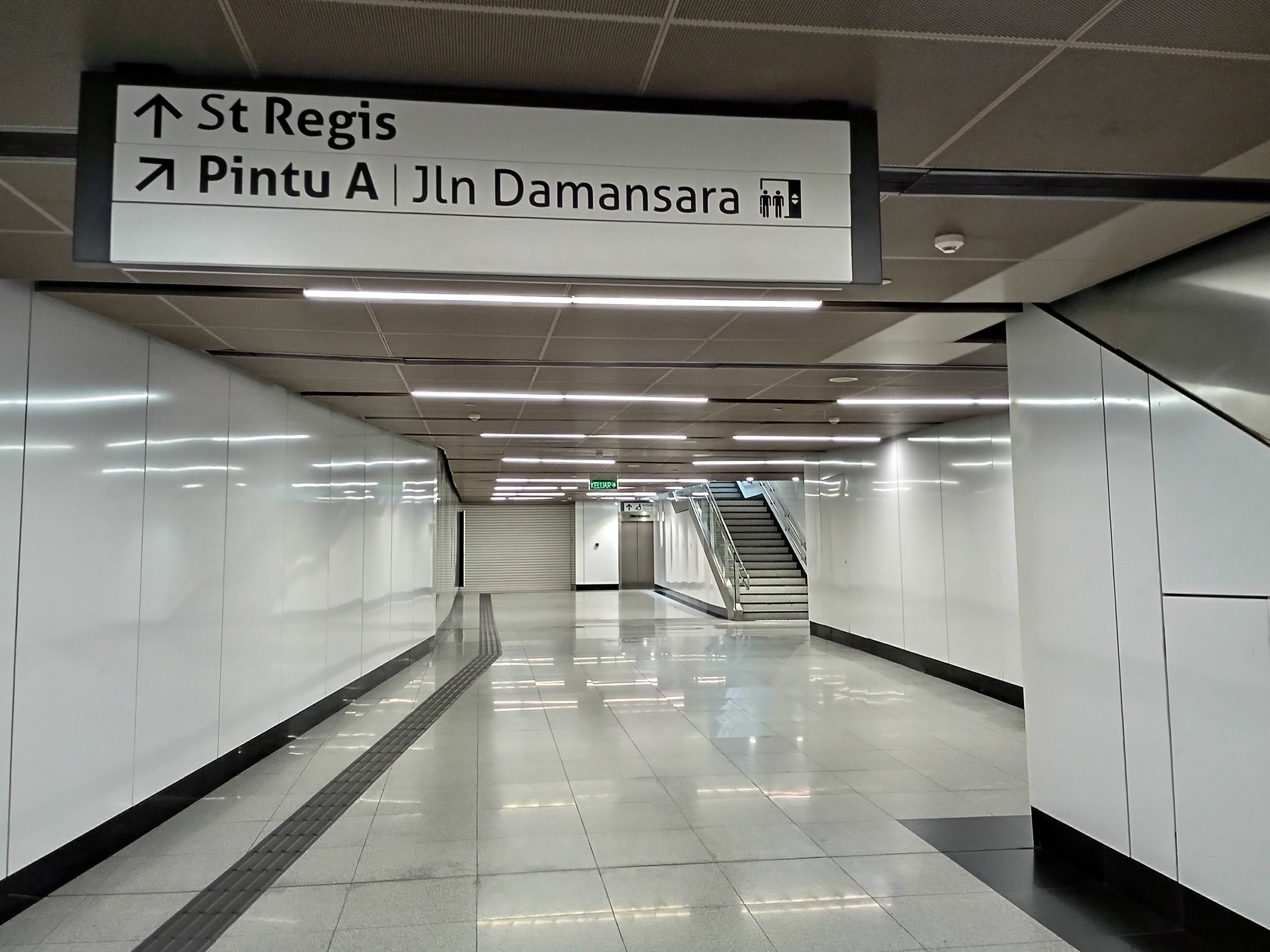
Walkway to Entrance A

=== Muzium Negara MRT station-KL Sentral Pedestrian Link ===
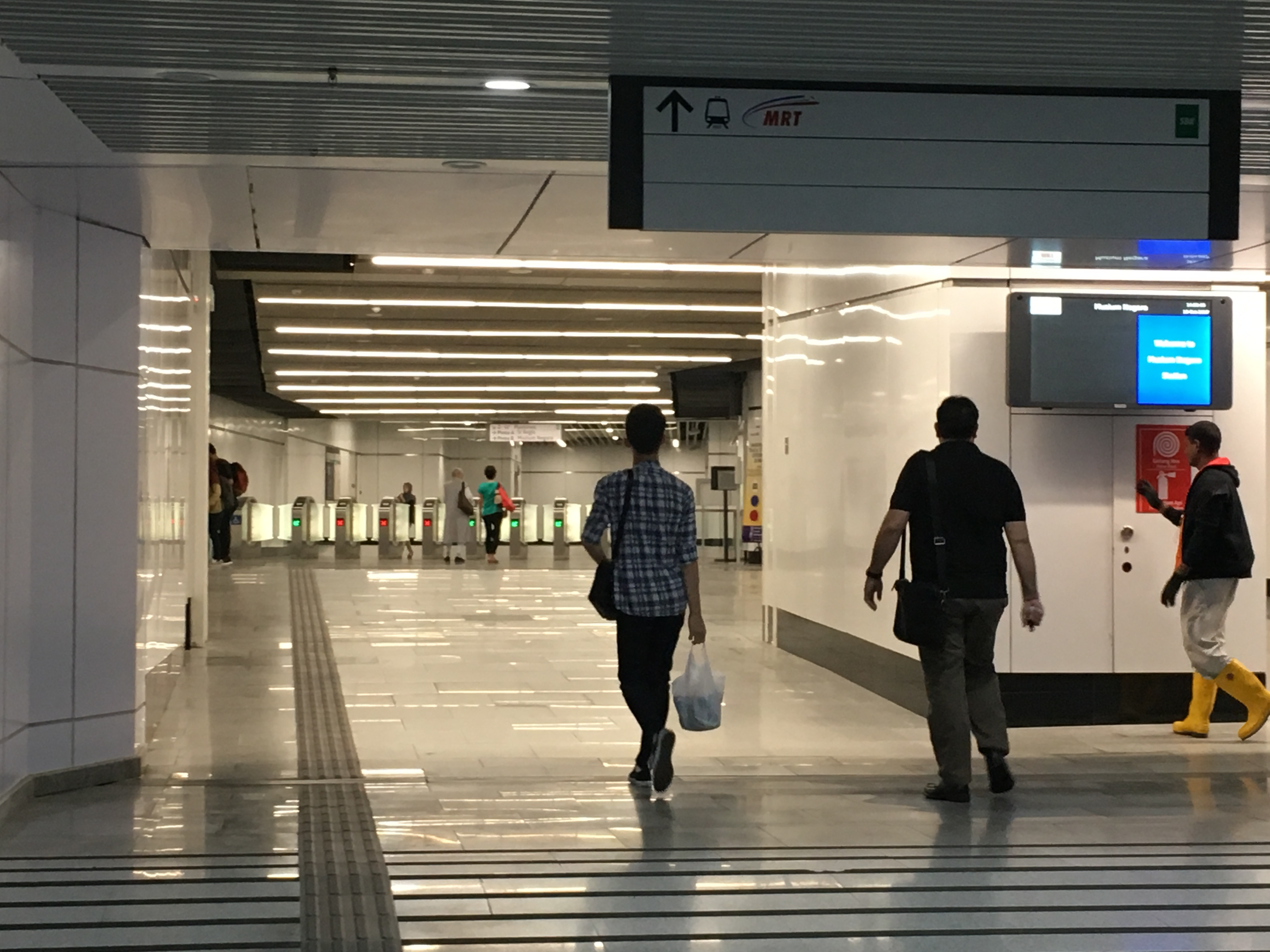
Commuters walking towards the MRT station from the link

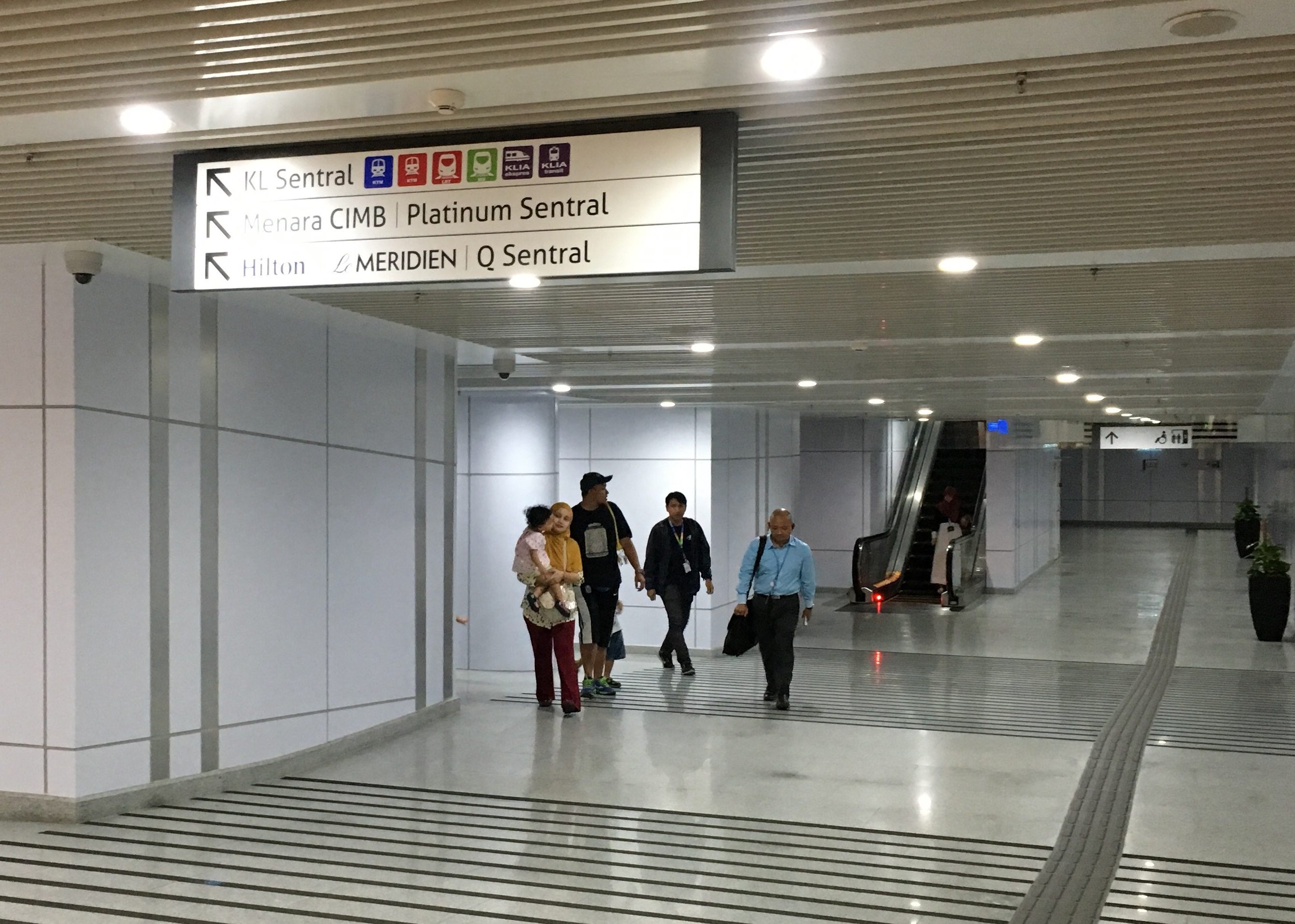
Commuters walking towards the MRT station from the link

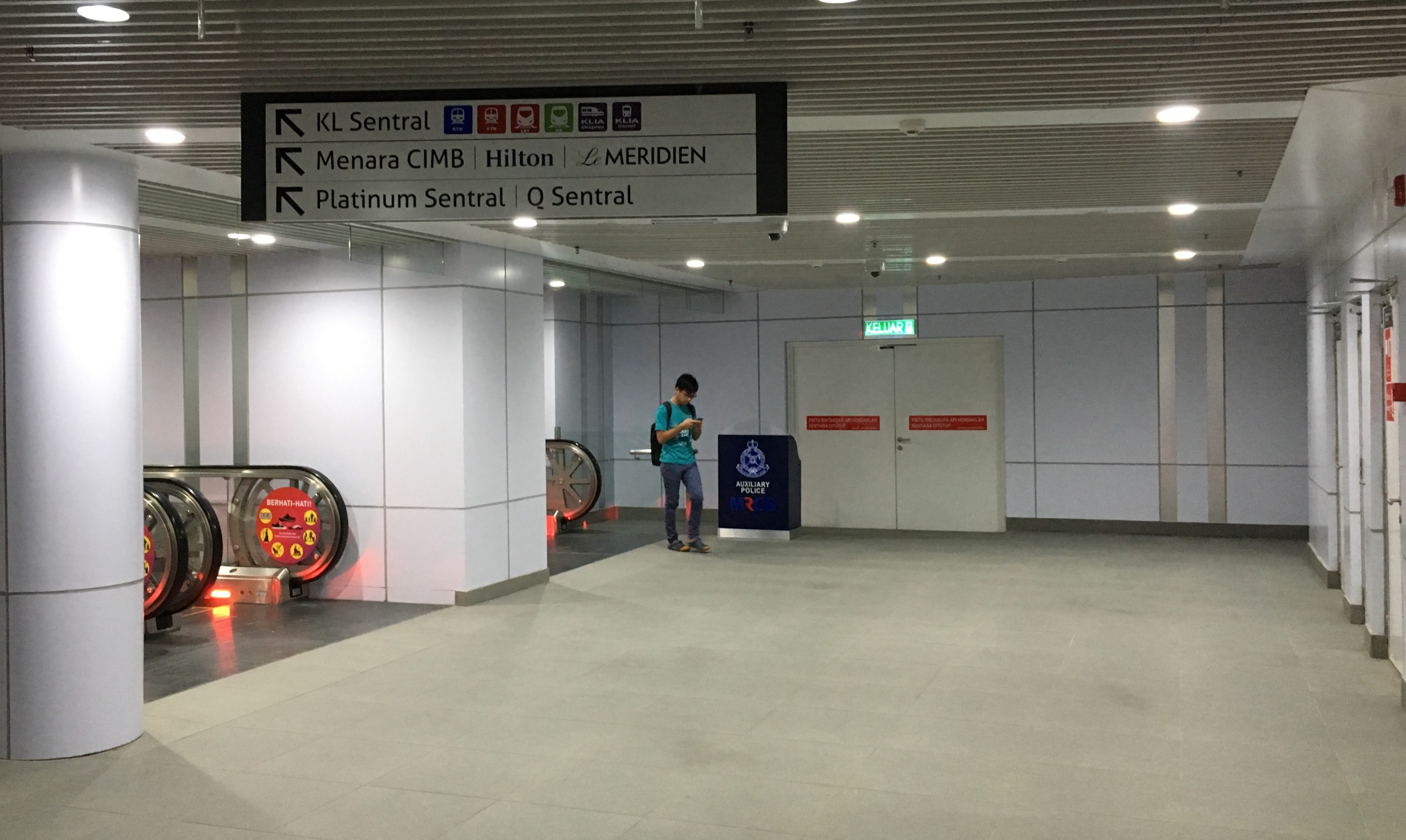
One of the escalator landings of the pedestrian link

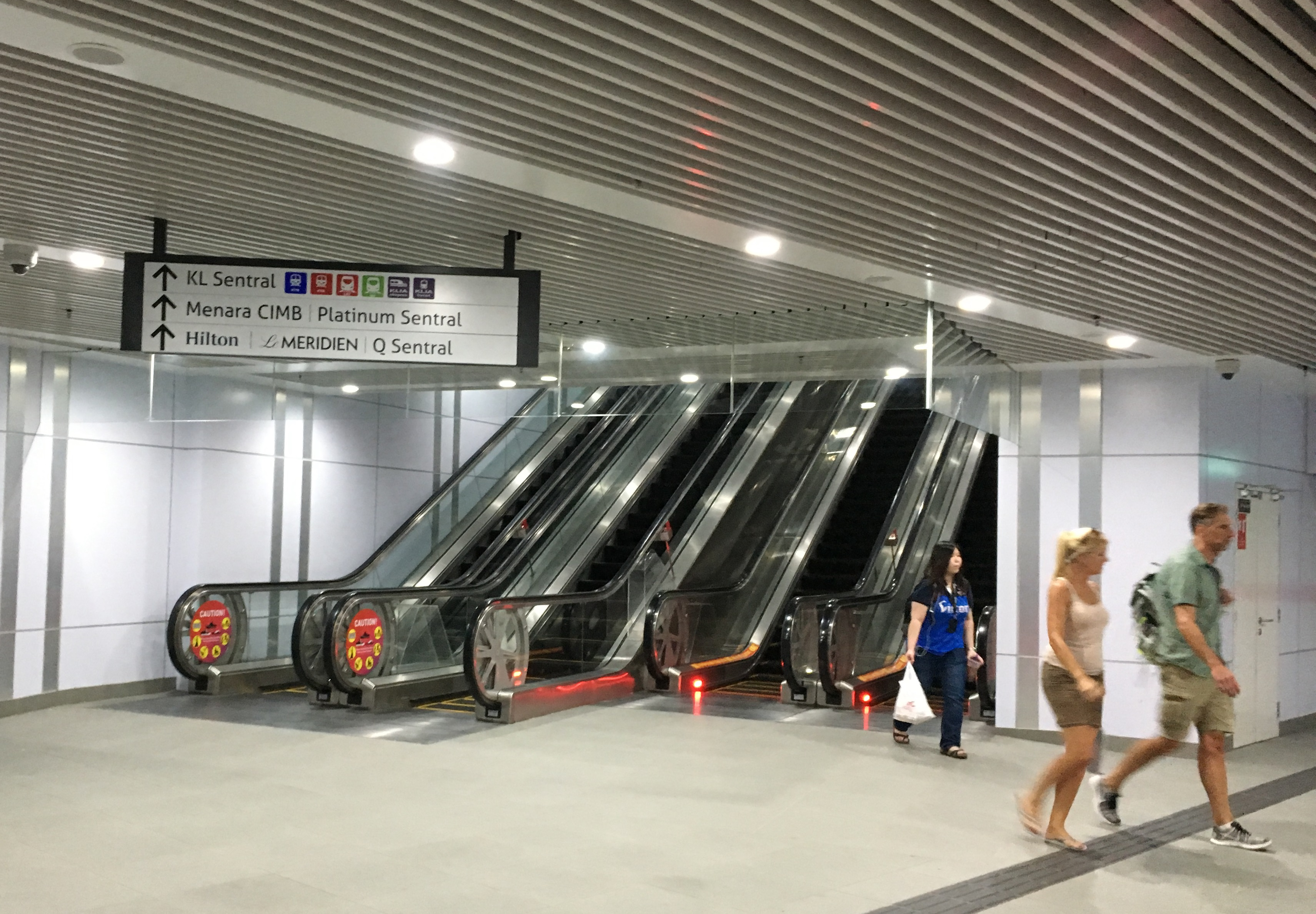
Escalators along the pedestrian link

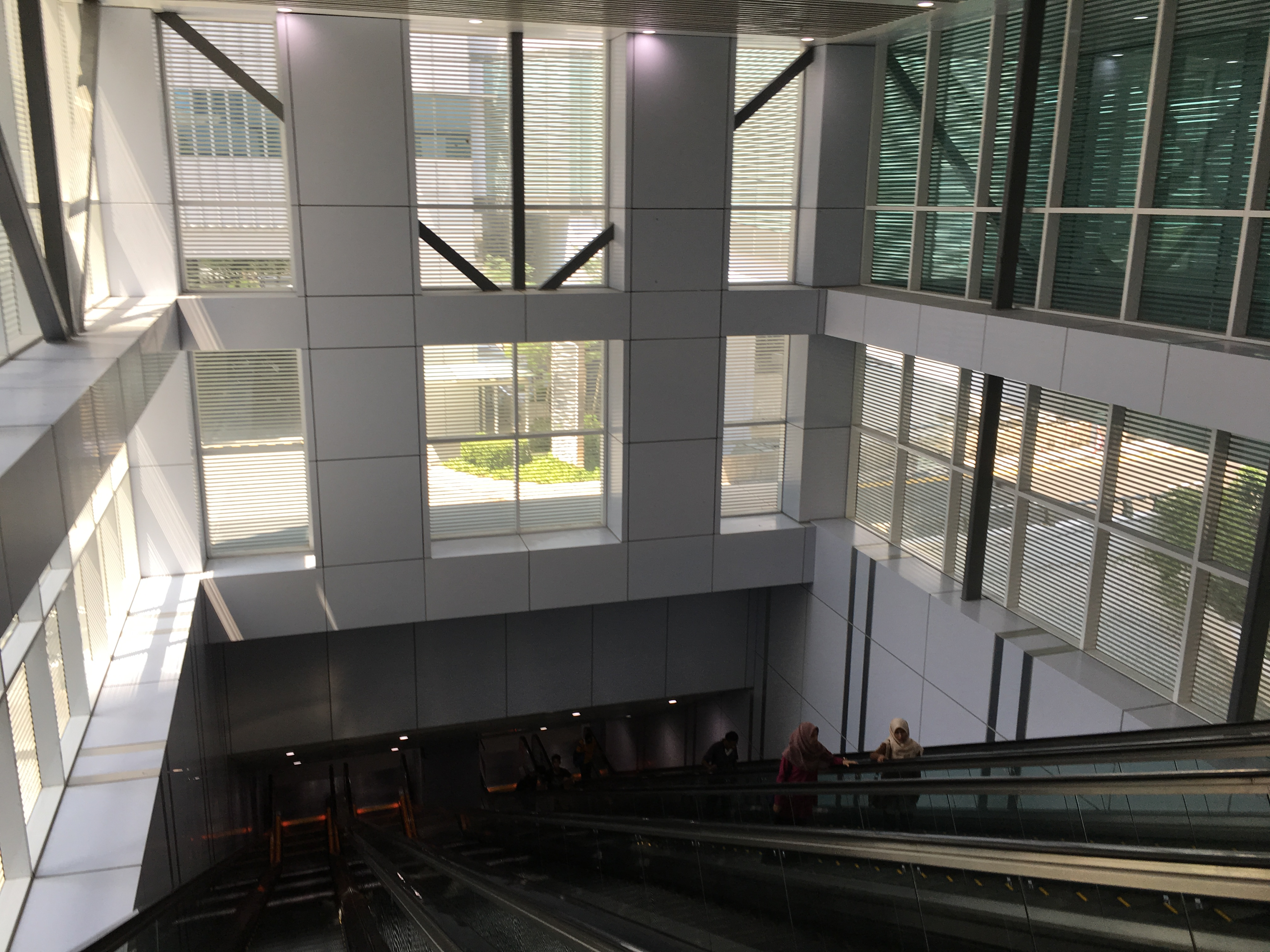
Escalators from the elevated section of the link descending to the underground section

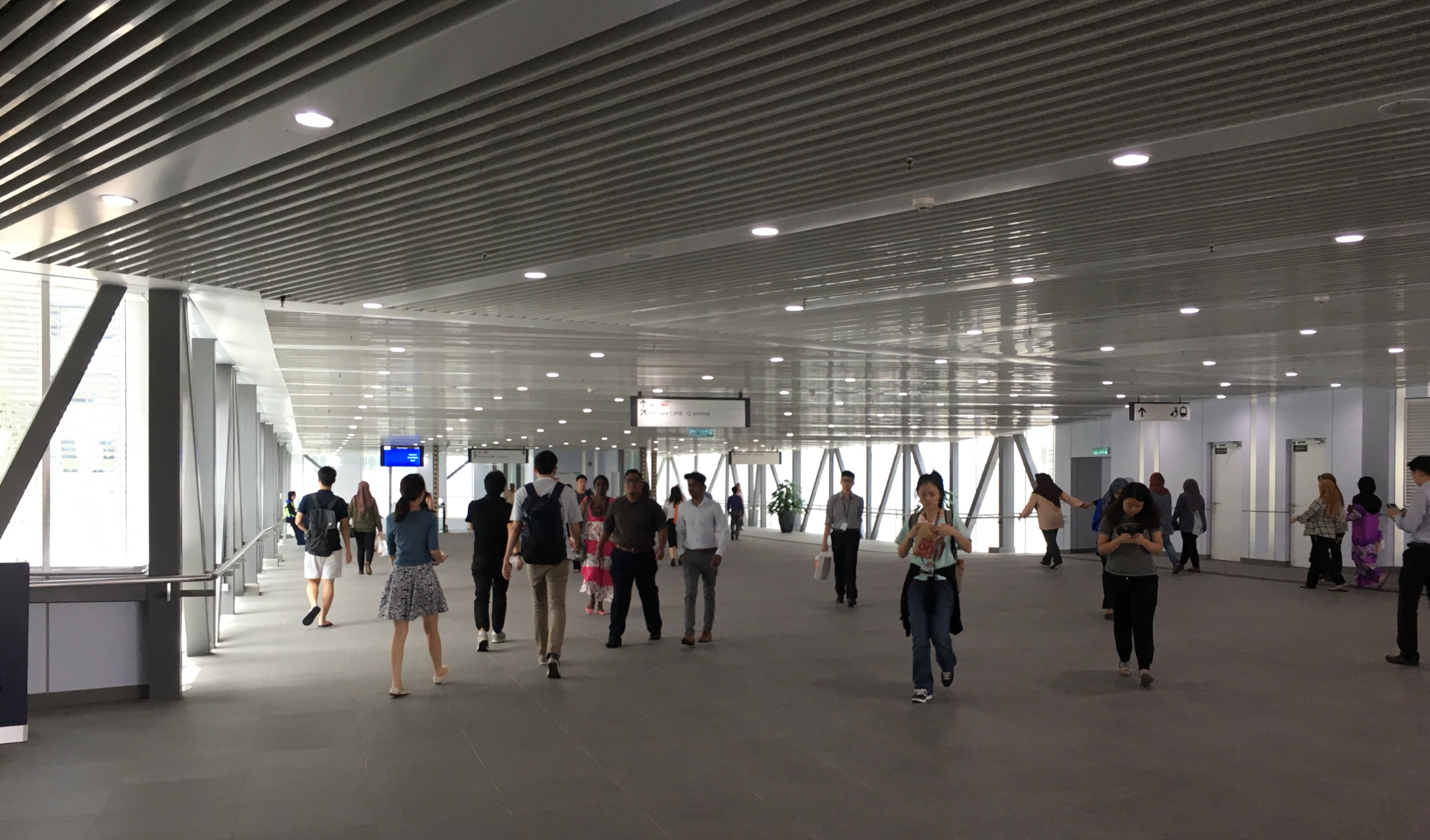
Elevated section of the pedestrian link

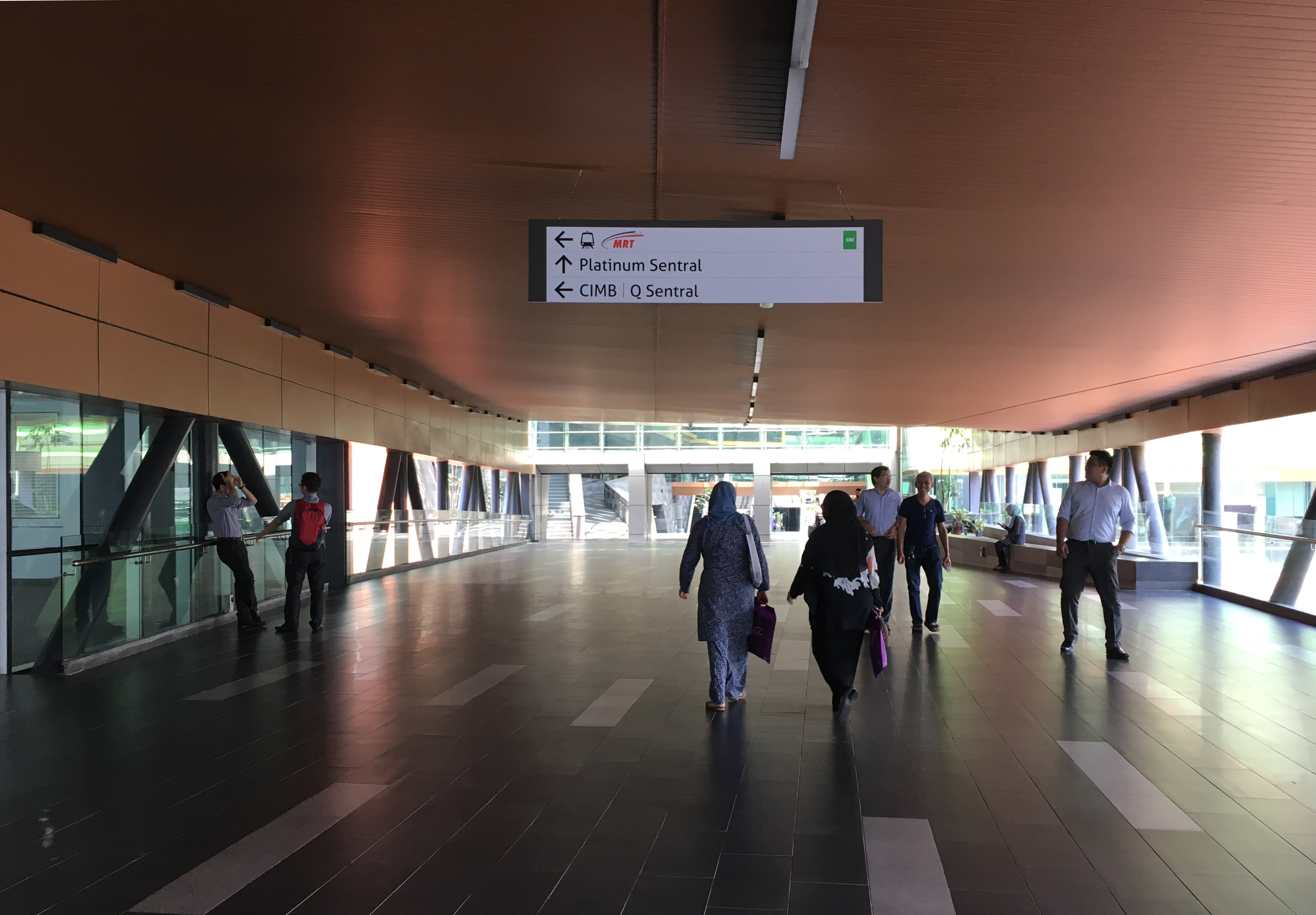
The pedestrian link connecting to Platinum Sentral

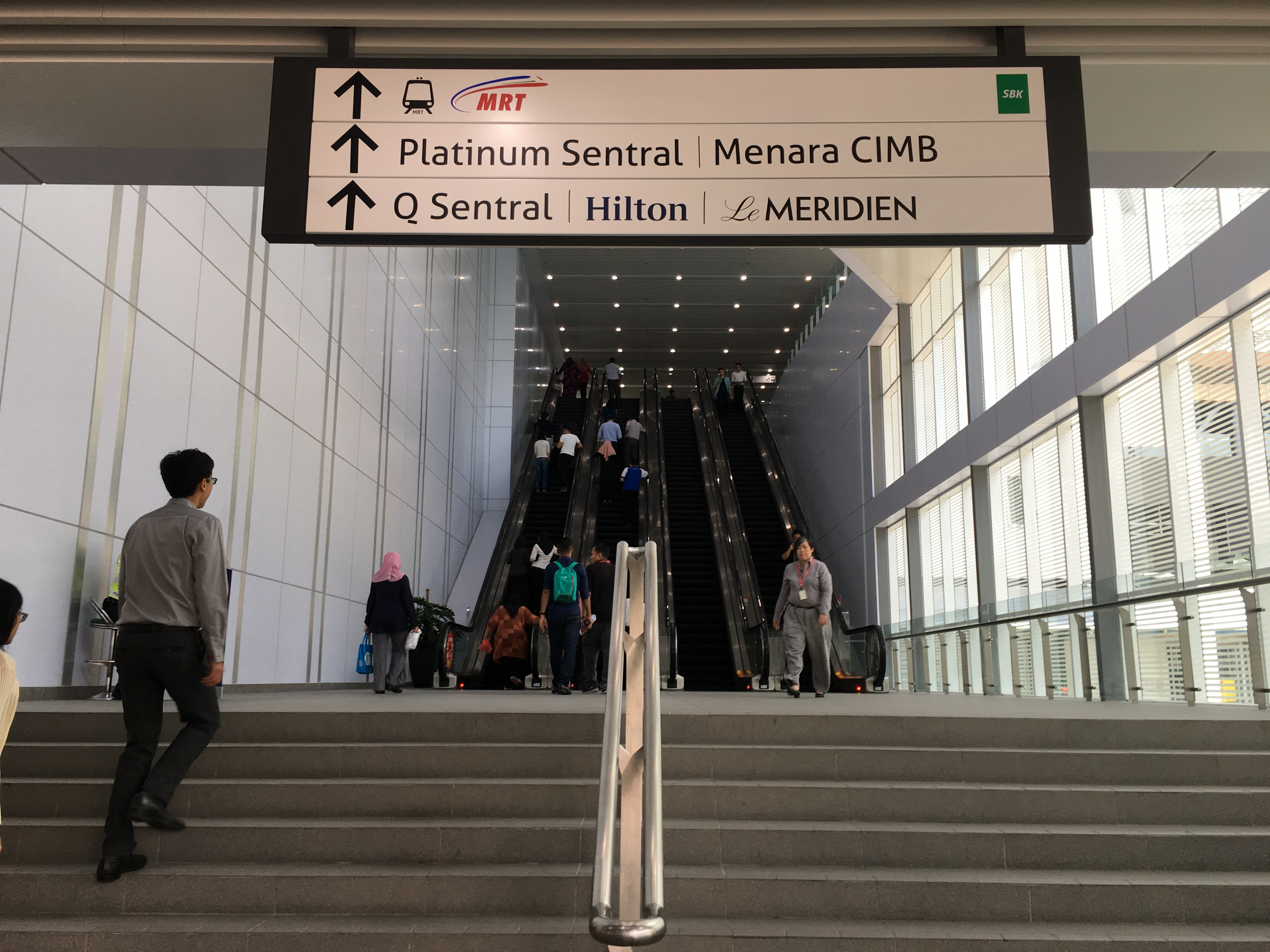
Escalators just after the pedestrian link entrance at the KLIA Ekspres arrival hall

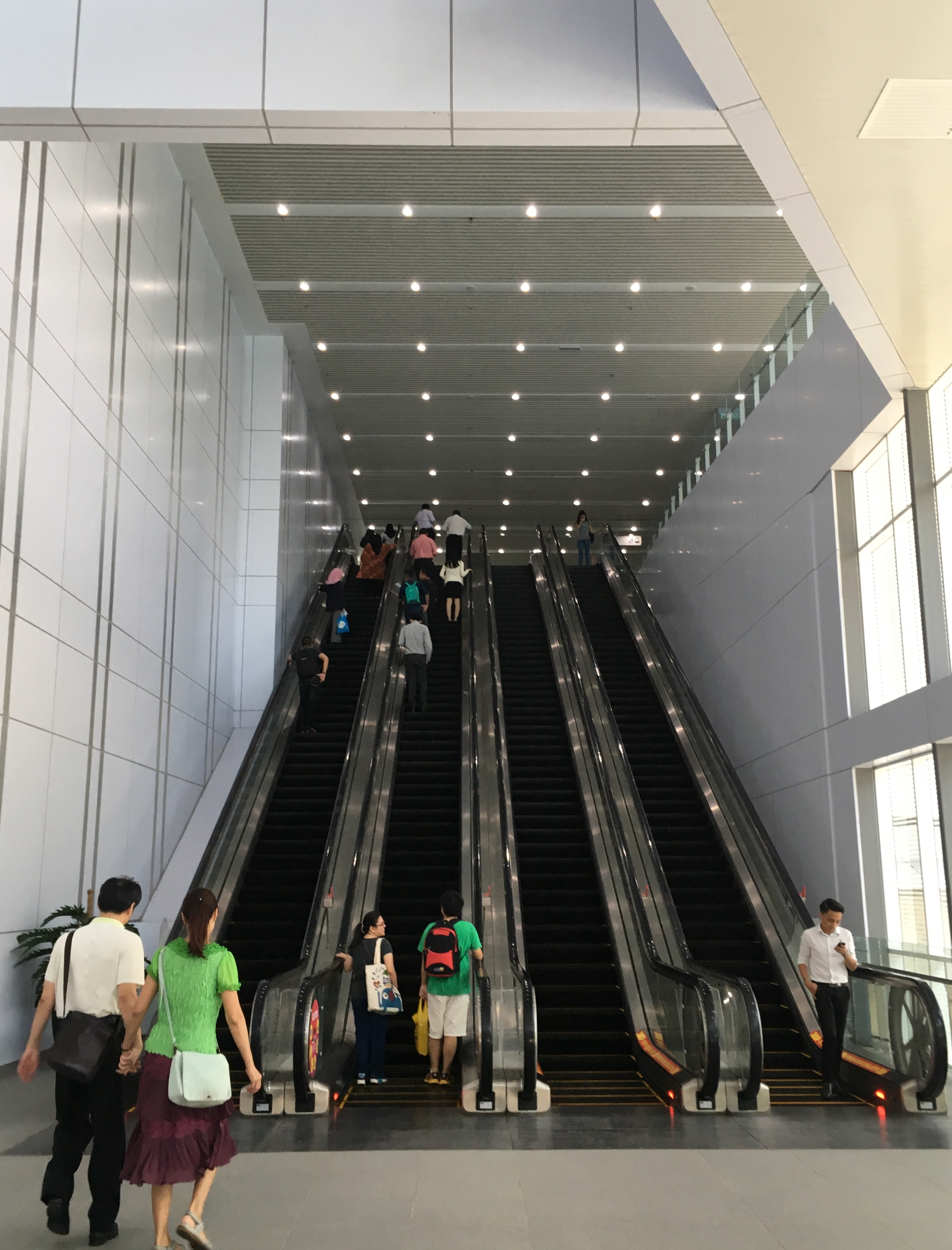
Escalators just after the pedestrian link entrance at the KLIA Ekspres arrival hall

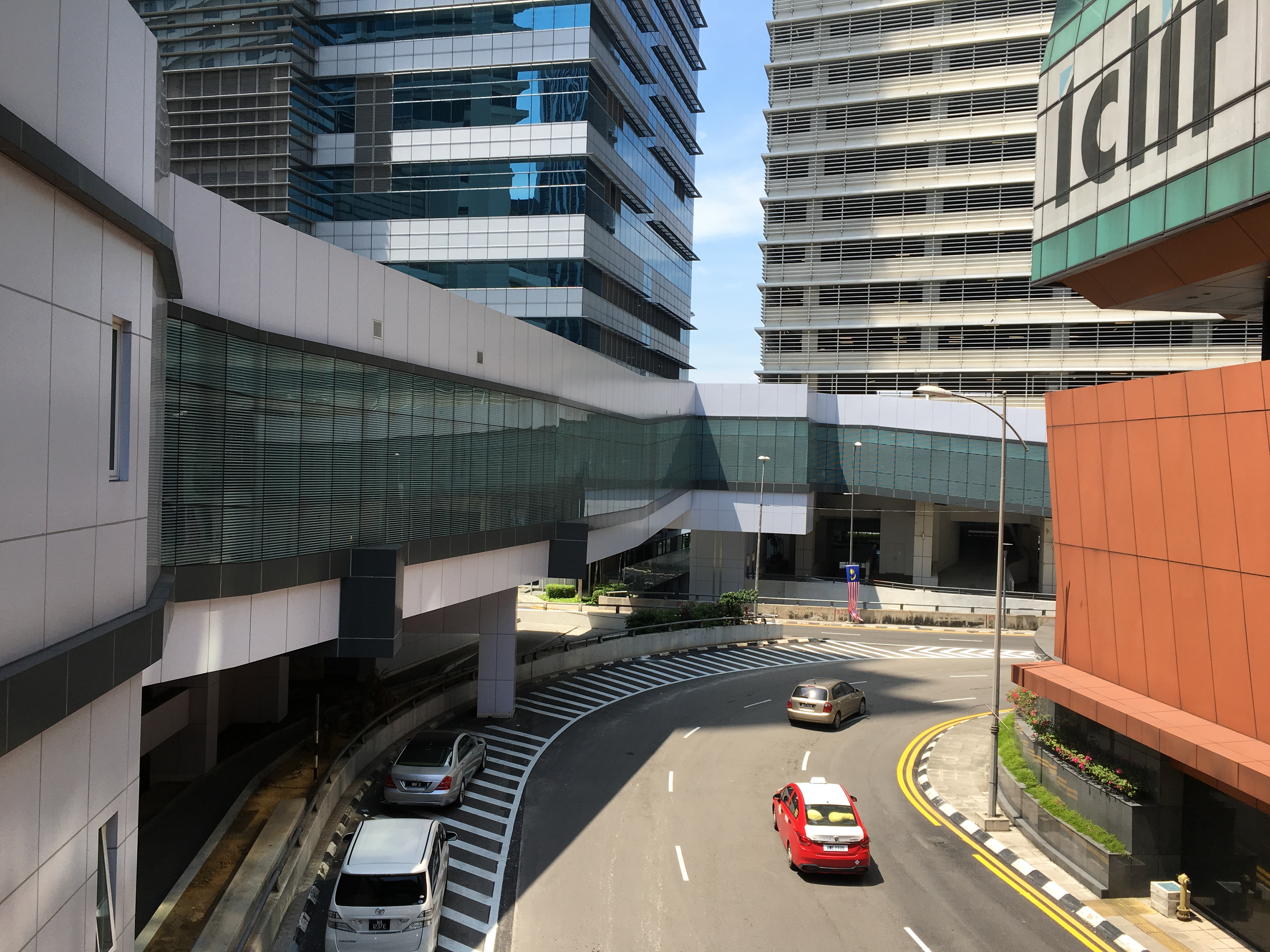
External view of the link at KL Sentral
