= Pantai Dalam =

Coordinates: 3°6′N 101°40′E

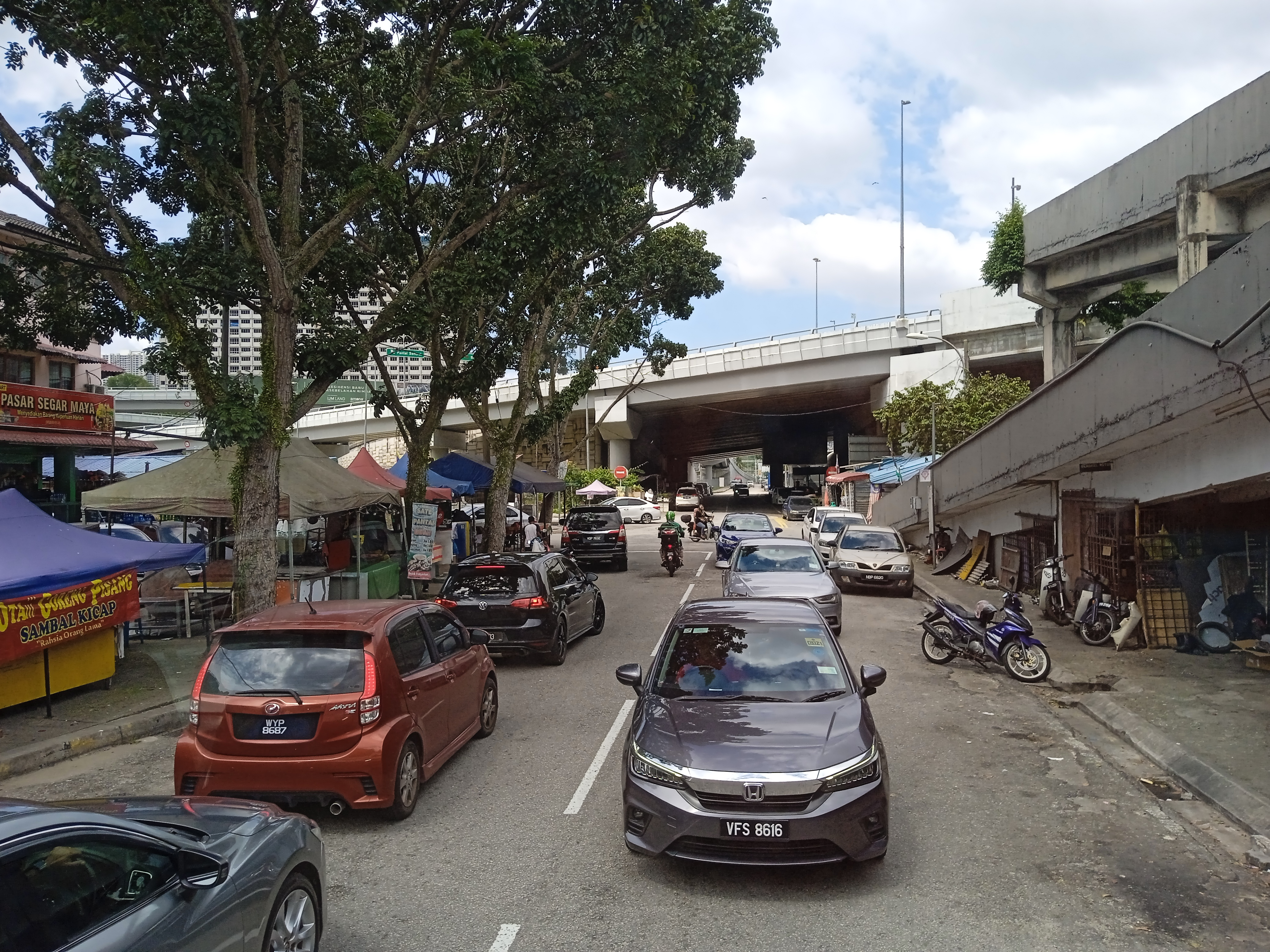
Jalan Pantai Dalam in Pantai Dalam

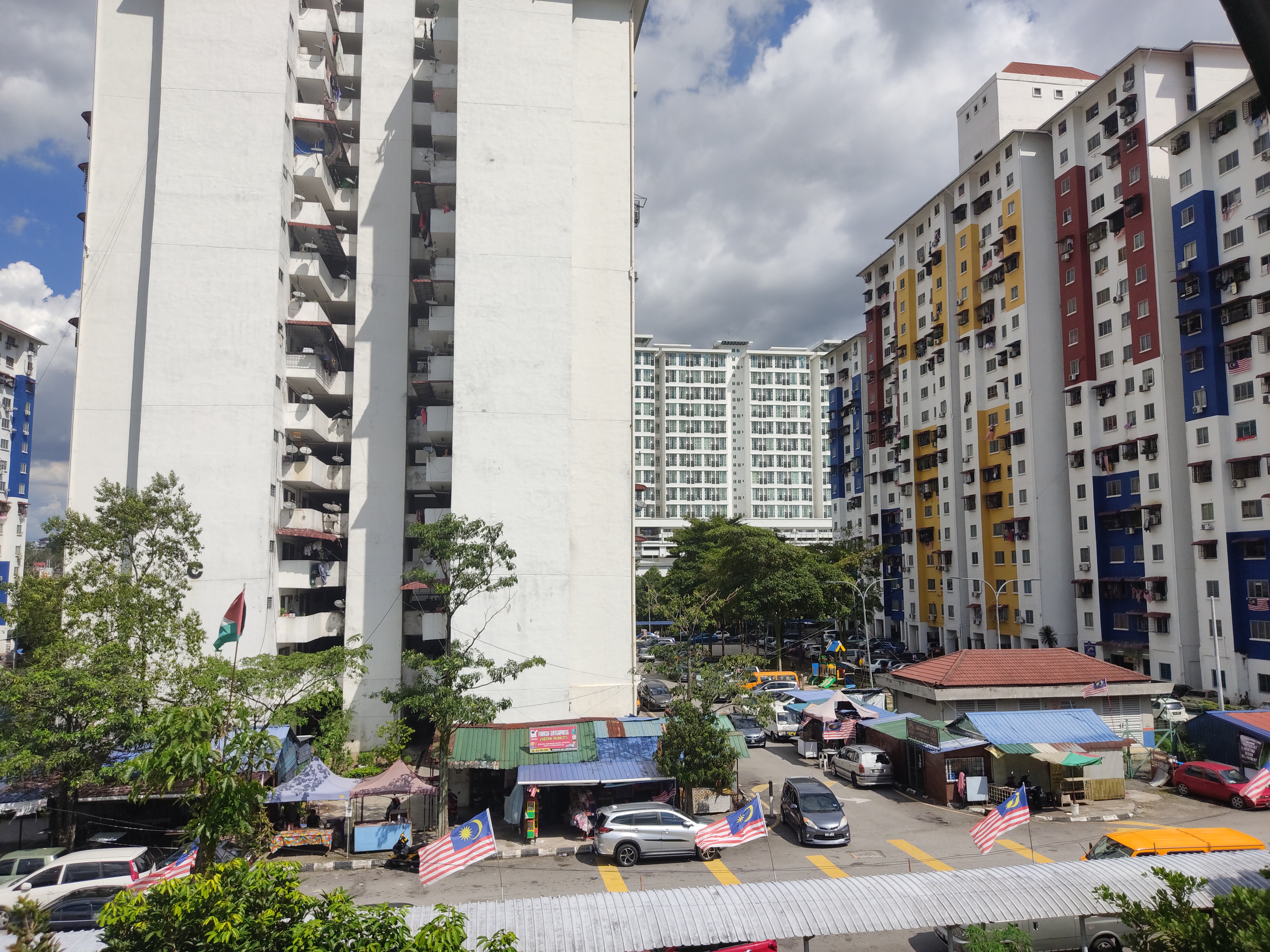
PPR Pantai Ria is one of the residential high-rise building in Pantai Dalam

Pantai Dalam is a residential area located south-west of Kuala Lumpur, under the parliamentary constituency of Lembah Pantai. Represented in Dewan Rakyat by Parti Keadilan Rakyat (PKR), Fahmi Fadzil.

Pantai Dalam got its name aptly from situated to the further south of the Pantai River (Sungai Pantai), a stream started from within University Malaya compound and converging into the Klang River.

== Demographics ==
Most of the areas residents are blue-collar workers living in flats that had been sold to them under the People's Housing Project when they were resettled from their squatter homes; students of the University of Malaya; and police officers and related personnel, mainly in Desa Aman 1 & 2.

The population is made up of 49% Malays, 19% Chinese and 32% Indians. Some squatters are still waiting to buy homes under this project, which was announced by Prime Minister Abdullah Ahmad Badawi prior to the 2008 general election.

Pantai Dalam is well connected to the other parts of Klang Valley via the New Pantai Expressway and the Federal Highway.

== Transportation ==
Public transport in Pantai Dalam covers a variety of transport modes such as bus, rail and taxi. Buses include RapidKL buses and Go KL City Bus. Rail service is available from KTM Komuter at Pantai Dalam Komuter station, Petaling Komuter station, and Angkasapuri Komuter station and from the Kelana Jaya Line at Kerinchi LRT station, Abdullah Hukum LRT station, and Universiti LRT station.

== Neighborhoods ==
There are many smaller residential areas that form the larger area of Pantai Dalam, including:

- The Park Residences
- Pantai Hillpark
- Kampung Pantai
- PPR Sri Pantai
- PPR Pantai Ria
- PPR Sri Cempaka
- PPR Kerinchi
- Desa Aman 1 & 2
- Pantai Murni
- Pantai Permai
- Taman Bukit Angkasa
- Pantai Baru
- Kampung Pasir
- Taman Pantai Dalam
- Taman Pantai Indah
- PPR Kampung Limau
- Pantai Panorama Condominium
- Capri by Fraser
- Camellia Serviced Apartment
- KL Gateway
- Kondo Rakyat Desa Pantai
- Pantai Sentral Park (柏翠林)
