= Angkasapuri Komuter station =

Railway station in Kuala Lumpur, Malaysia

Coordinates: 3°06′47″N 101°40′24″E

Angkasapuri

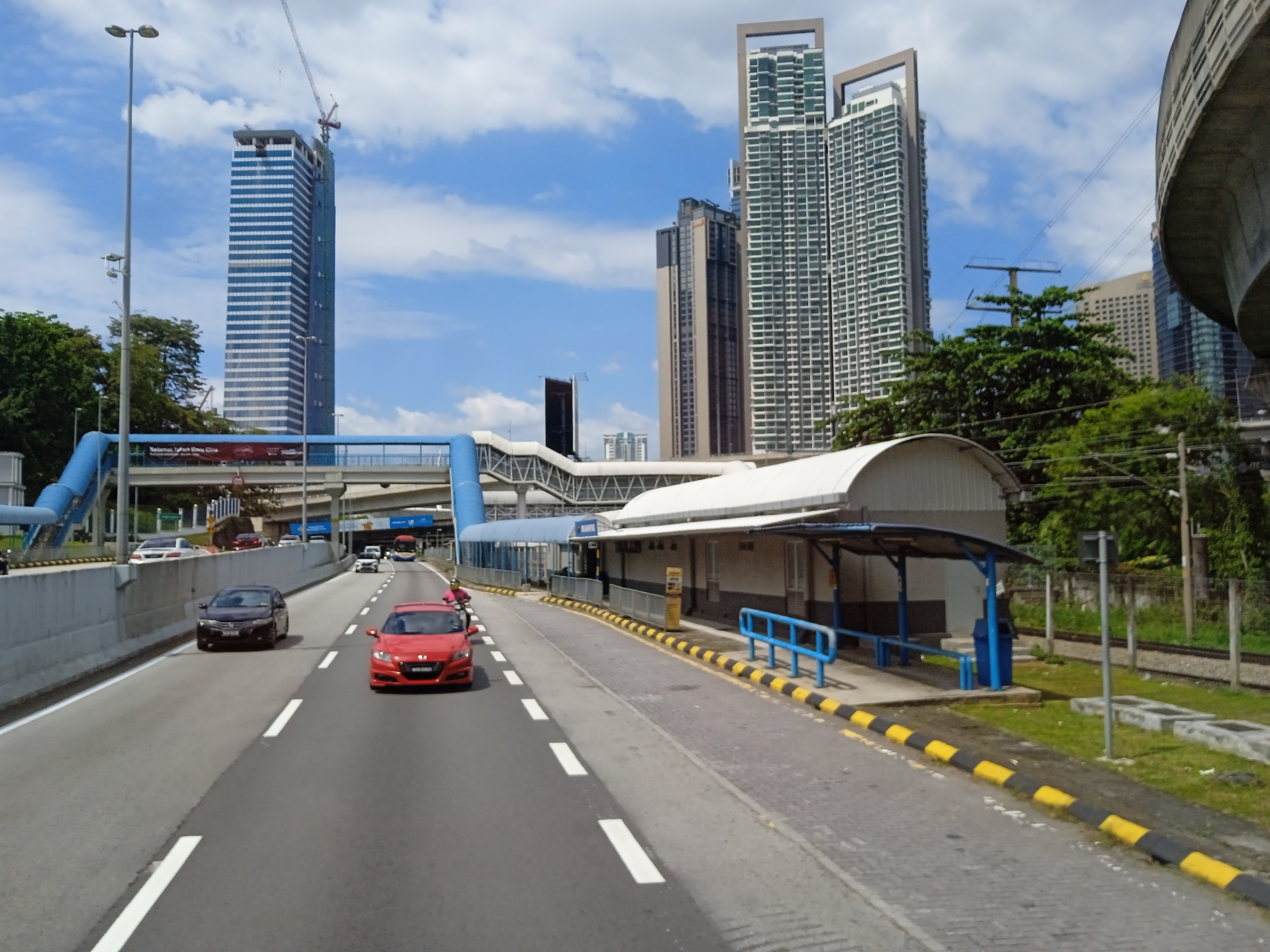

General information
- Other names: Malay: اڠکاسڤوري (Jawi); Chinese: 广播大厦; Tamil: அங்காசாபுரி
- Location: Jalan Angkasapuri, Angkasapuri, 59200 Kuala Lumpur
- System: KD02 | Commuter rail station
- Owner: Keretapi Tanah Melayu
- Line: Port Klang Branch
- Platforms: 2 side platforms
- Tracks: 2
- Connections: GO KL Pink Route

Construction
- Parking: Not available

Other information
- Station code: KD02

History
- Opened: 1995

Services
Preceding station	KTM Komuter	Following station
Abdullah Hukum towards Tanjung Malim	Tanjung Malim–Port Klang Line	Pantai Dalam towards Port Klang
Location

The Angkasapuri Komuter station is a KTM Komuter train station located near Angkasapuri, Kuala Lumpur. It is served by the Port Klang Line. The station primarily serves and is named after Angkasapuri, the headquarters of RTM.

Located nearby are the Sri Damesh private school and the neighbourhoods of Pantai Dalam and Kampung Kerinchi. The Kerinchi and Abdullah Hukum LRT stations are also nearby, although pedestrian access is almost impossible.

== Feeder buses ==
Route No.	Operator	Origin	Destination	Via	Frequency (Minutes)	Operating Hours
GO KL Pink Route	GO KL (buses provided by RapidKL)	KD02; KTM Angkasapuri	KJ19 Universiti	Jalan Kerinchi; Bangsar South ( KJ18 Kerinchi)	0.5 - 1 hour	06:00 - 22:00

== Gallery ==
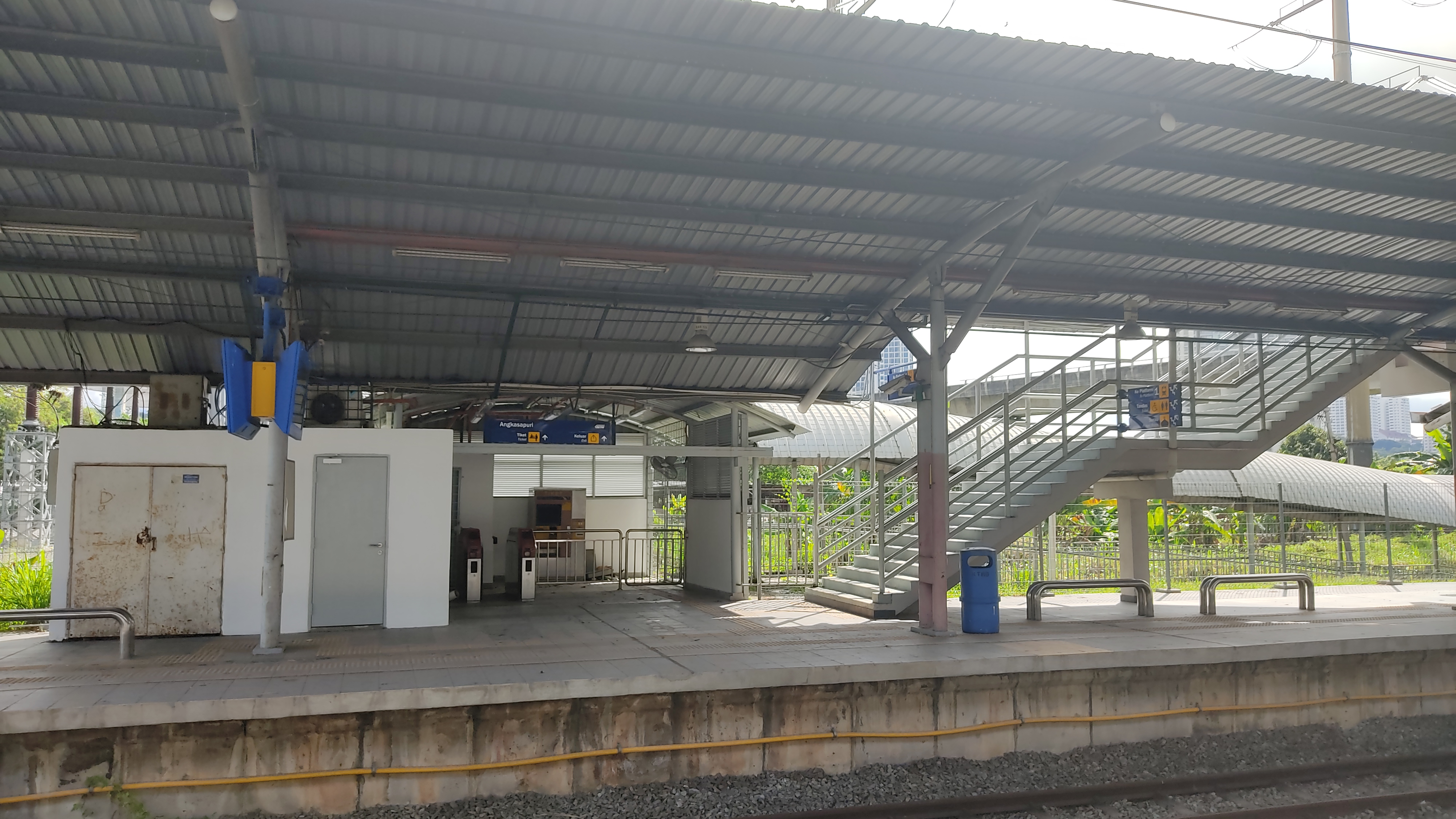
Station building and faregates

Station signboard

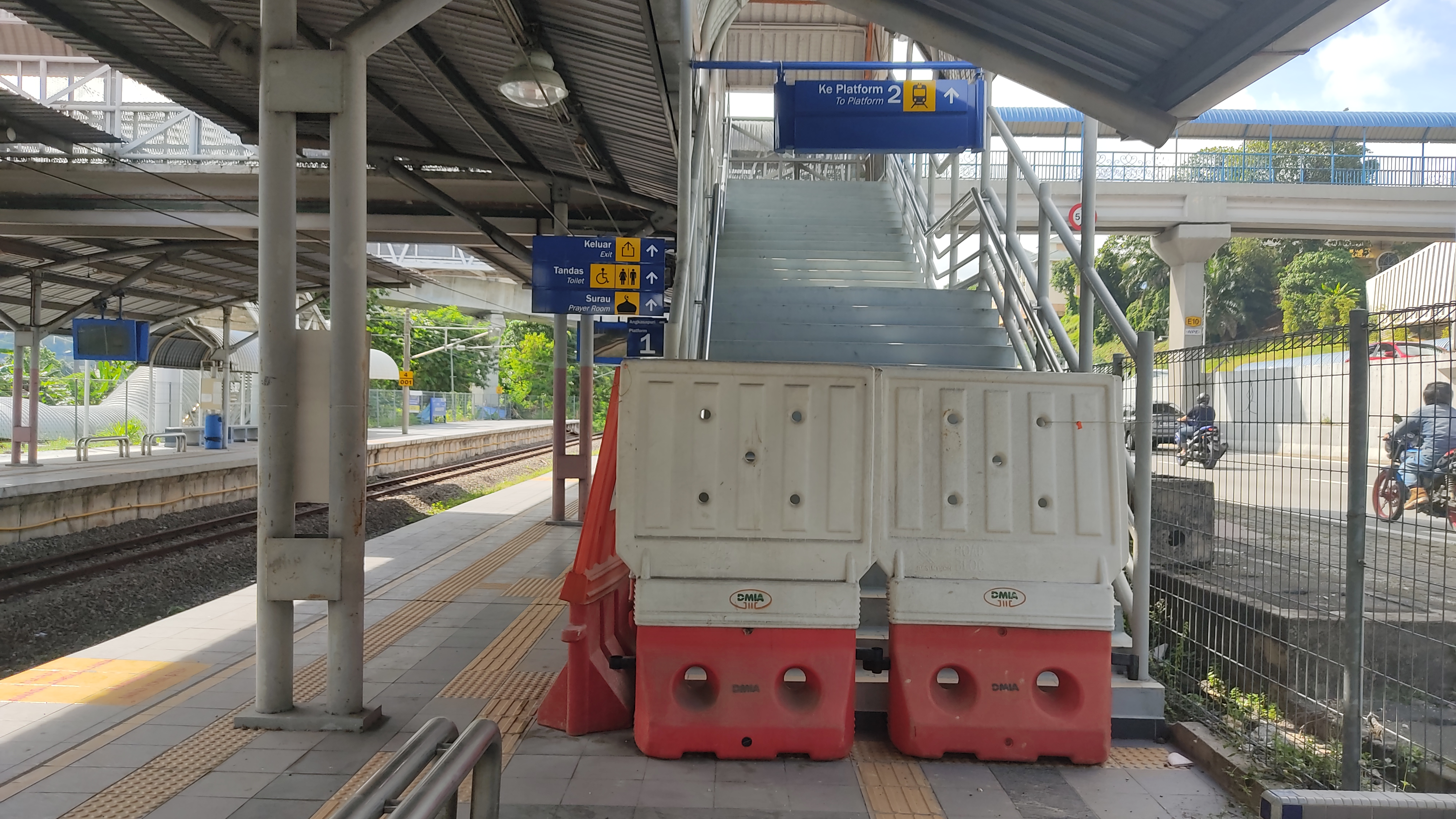
Blocked bridge of Angkasapuri station, only one side platform being used as of 2021 due to KVDT project

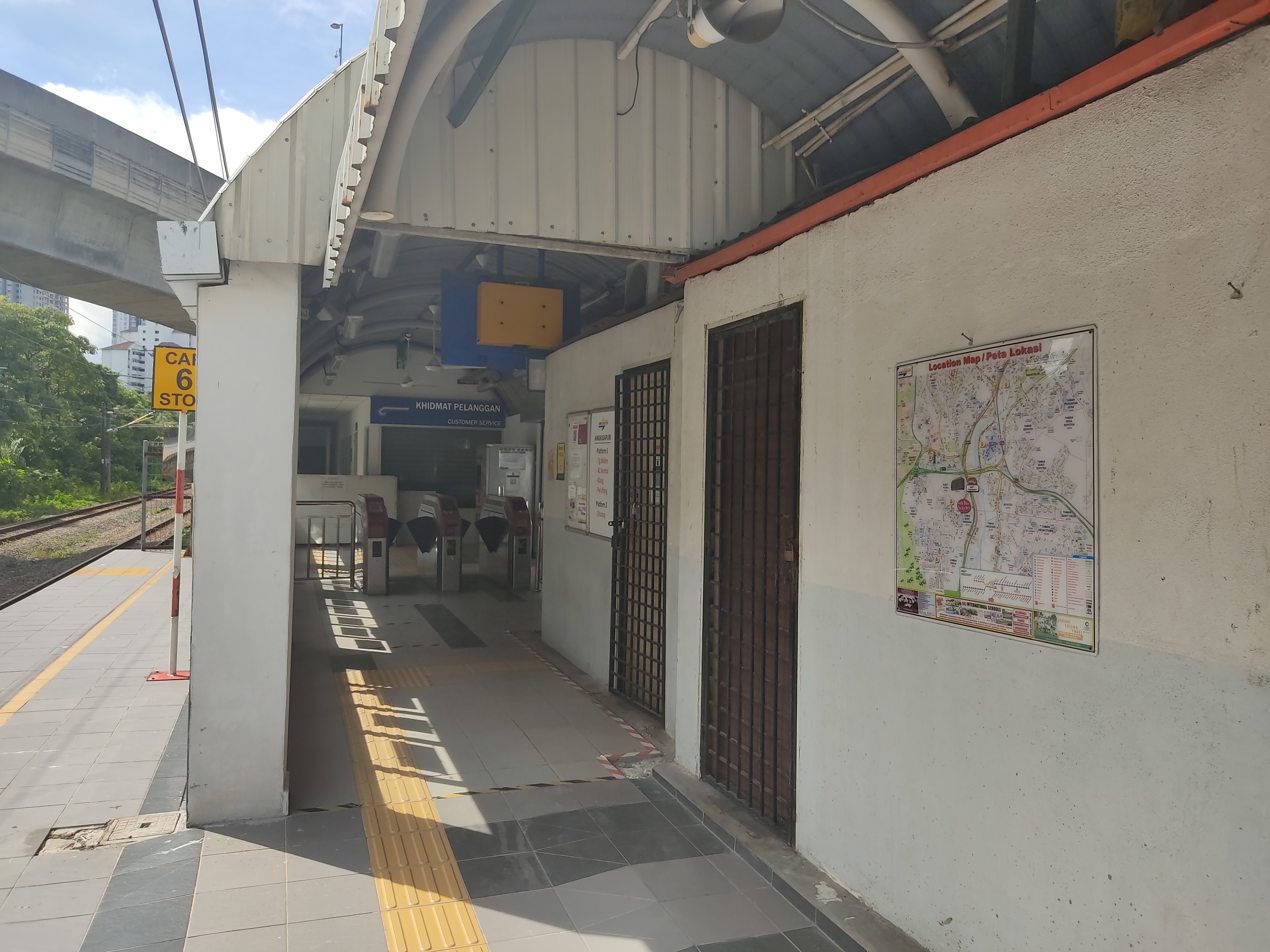
Station exit with location map of Angkasapuri station
