= Mid Valley Komuter station =

KTM station in Kuala Lumpur, Malaysia

Mid Valley

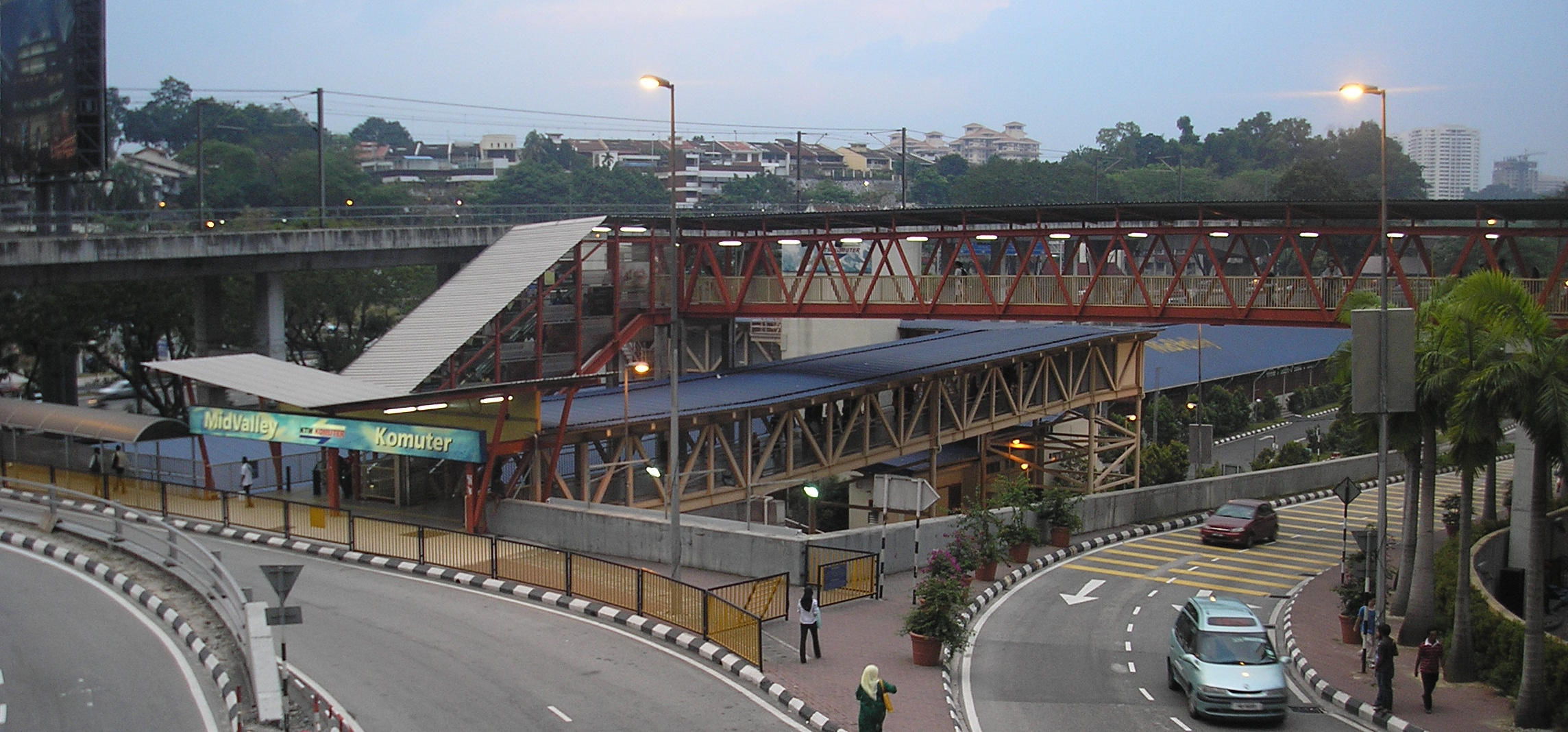
- The exterior of the Mid Valley Komuter station. The station's primary role is to serve the Mid Valley Megamall and surrounding commercial facilities.

General information
- Other names: Malay: ميد ۏالي (Jawi); Chinese: 谷中城; Tamil: மிட் வெளி
- Location: Mid Valley City, Seputeh, Lembah Pantai, Kuala Lumpur; Malaysia
- Coordinates: 3°7′6″N 101°40′43″E
- System: KB01 | Commuter rail station
- Owner: Railway Assets Corporation
- Operator: Keretapi Tanah Melayu
- Line: West Coast Line
- Platforms: 2 side platforms
- Tracks: 2
- Connections: Pedestrian bridge to KD01 KJ17 Abdullah Hukum via The Gardens Mall and KL Eco City

Construction
- Structure type: At-grade
- Parking: Available
- Cycle facilities: Not available
- Accessible: Yes

Other information
- Station code: KB01

History
- Opened: 23 August 2004; 22 years ago

Services
Preceding station	Keretapi Tanah Melayu (Komuter)	Following station
Kuala Lumpur Sentral towards Batu Caves	Batu Caves–Pulau Sebang Line	Seputeh towards Pulau Sebang/Tampin
Location

The Mid Valley Komuter station is a KTM Komuter at-grade train station located in Lembah Pantai, Kuala Lumpur. The halt is on the KTM Komuter's Batu Caves–Pulau Sebang Line.

== History ==
The station was completed at a total cost of RM12.2 million, and opened to the public in August 2004.

=== Connection to Abdullah Hukum ===
A pedestrian bridge to the KL Eco City was opened on 14 November 2019, enabling pedestrian access from Mid Valley station to Abdullah Hukum station on the Tanjung Malim–Port Klang Line and Kelana Jaya Line.

In 2021, part of the station was closed for upgrading works. Only the side of the station for trains going southwards to Kajang and Seremban remained open.

== Design ==
The station consists of two levels: the upper, elevated level supports a ticketing concourse and faregates, while the lower ground level contains fully covered platforms linked from the upper level via staircases or elevators for handicap passengers. Breaking from the norm of older KTM Komuter stations, the Mid Valley station features high arched canopies and steel support frames, designs emulated in the Kepong Sentral station, another new KTM Komuter station opened later in 2006.

== Mid Valley City ==
The station was constructed south with a cross bridge to Taman Seputeh, and is located 200m from Mid Valley City, which contains the Mid Valley Megamall and The Gardens, the former connected to the station by an overhead bridge. The station was intended to address the traffic problem surrounding the mall, which, prior to the completion of the station is only reachable via road vehicles, creating frequent traffic jams around the area. Parking services are unavailable directly at the station as the station was intended to primarily service the Mid Valley City area only, and parking areas are already supposedly provided in Mid Valley City itself. Nevertheless, bus services do stop within the vicinity of the station via Jalan Syed Putra, a major roadway which passes the station.

The Mid Valley station is one of only three KTM Komuter train stations that is located close or adjacent to a shopping complex. The other stations are the Subang Jaya station at the Port Klang Line, constructed near the Subang Parade mall, and the Bank Negara station, connected to the SOGO complex and the Ampang Line's Bandaraya station by a footbridge across Jalan Kuching and the Gombak River.

== Gallery ==
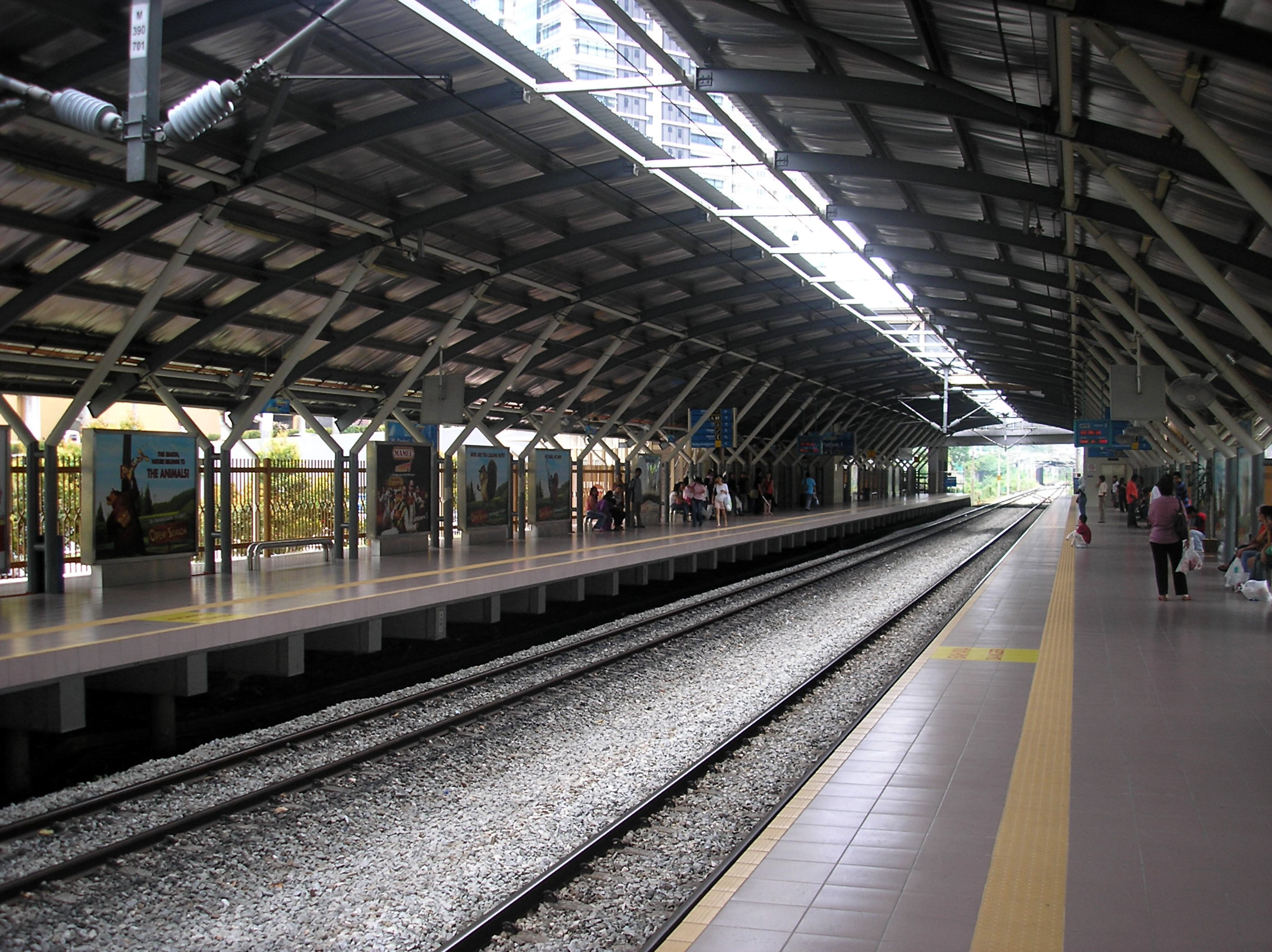
The platforms of the Mid Valley station sport a significantly different design from most other KTM Komuter stations

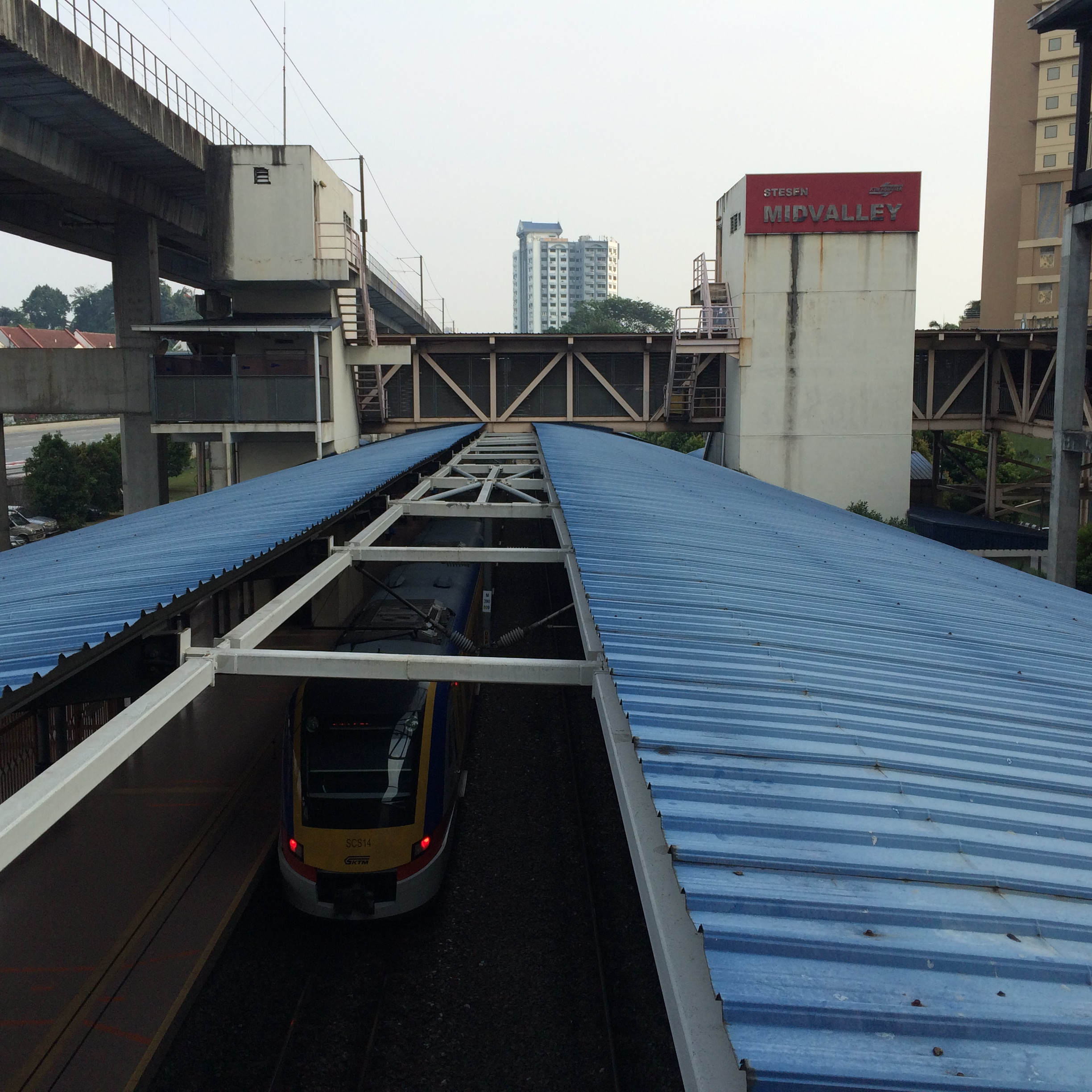
KTM train at Mid Valley Station

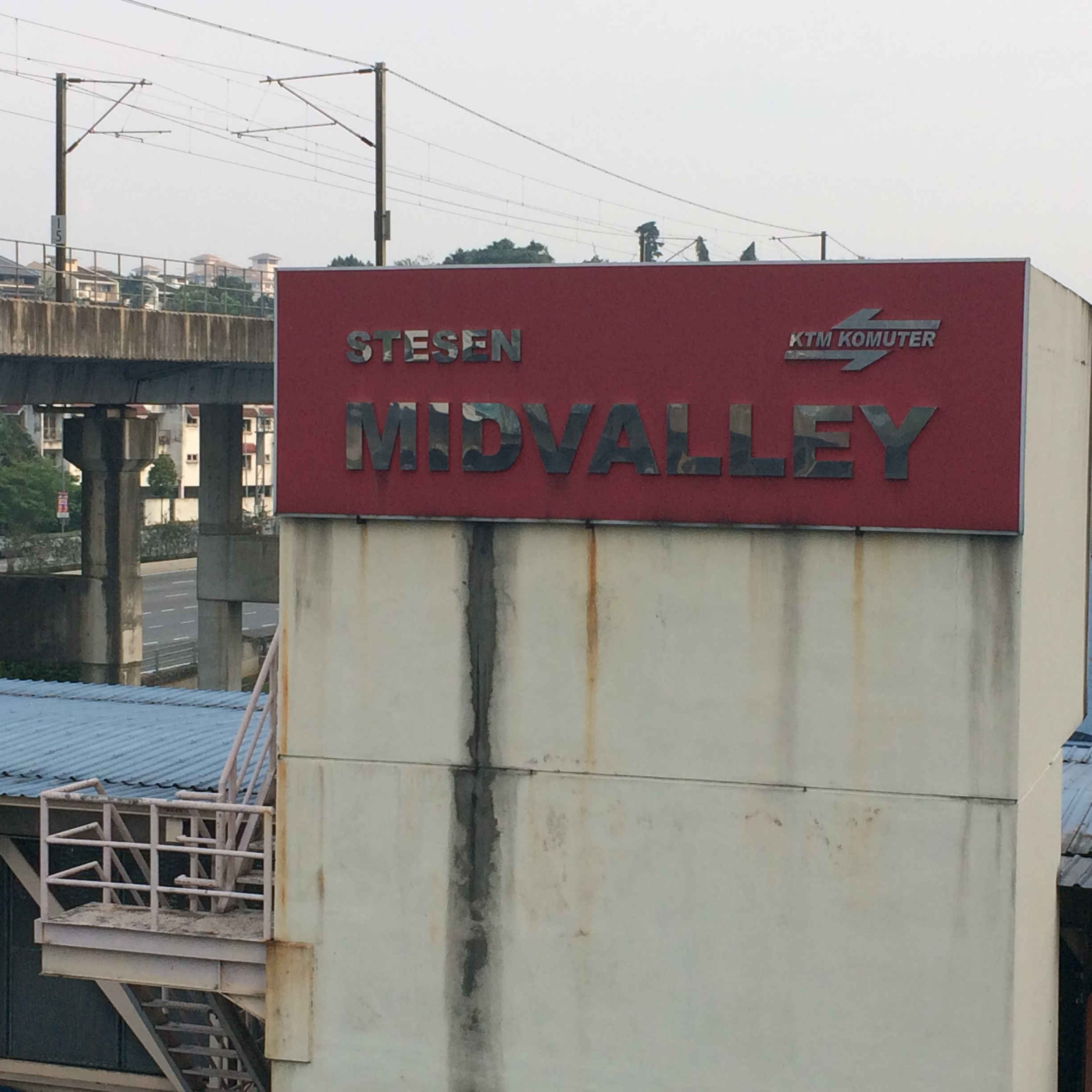
Mid Valley Station

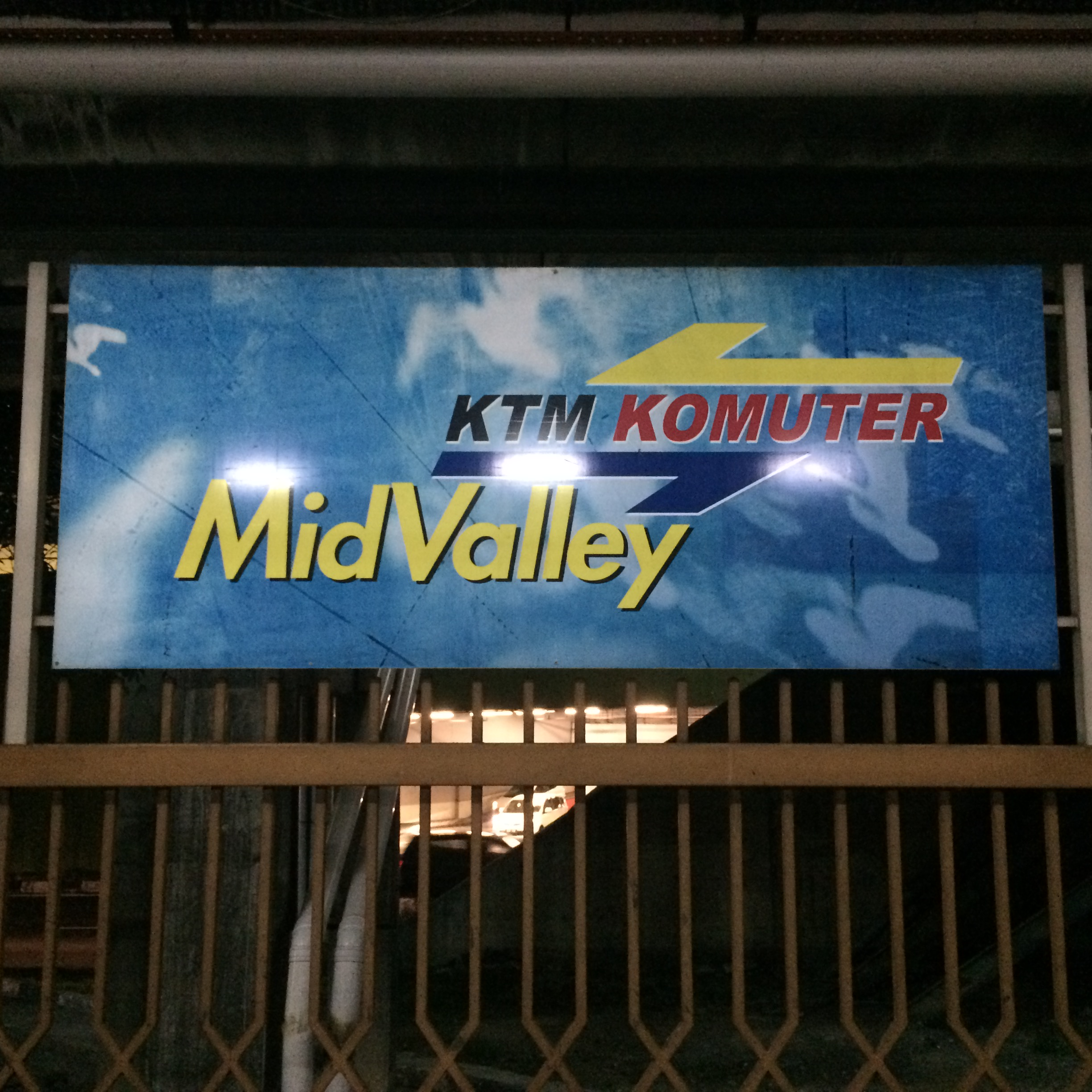
Mid Valley Komuter station
