= Seputeh Komuter station =

Railway station in Seputeh, Kuala Lumpur, Malaysia

Seputeh

- Station entrance at 2026

General information
- Other names: Malay: سڤوتيه (Jawi); Chinese: 士布爹; Tamil: செபுத்தே
- Location: Taman Seputeh, Kuala Lumpur; Malaysia
- Coordinates: 3°6′49″N 101°40′53″E
- System: KB02 | Commuter rail station
- Owner: Railway Assets Corporation
- Operator: Keretapi Tanah Melayu
- Line: West Coast Line
- Platforms: 2 side platforms
- Tracks: 2

Construction
- Structure type: At-grade
- Parking: Not available

Other information
- Station code: KB02

History
- Opened: 1995

Services
Preceding station	KTM Komuter	Following station
Mid Valley towards Batu Caves	Batu Caves–Pulau Sebang Line	Salak Selatan towards Pulau Sebang/Tampin
Location

The Seputeh Komuter station is a KTM Komuter railway station located in Seputeh, Kuala Lumpur, Malaysia. It is served by the KTM Komuter's Batu Caves–Pulau Sebang route and is identified by the station code KB02. The station is situated along the West Coast Line, between Mid Valley Komuter station and Salak Selatan Komuter station.

== Location ==
The station is located in Taman Seputeh, within the established residential neighbourhood of Seputeh in southwestern Kuala Lumpur. The surrounding area consists of a mixture of landed residential properties, apartments and condominiums, with nearby commercial developments and amenities.

Seputeh is situated within walking distance of Mid Valley City, which includes Mid Valley Megamall and The Gardens Mall. The neighbourhood is also associated with the adjoining residential areas of Robson Heights and Taman Seputeh. The area's development dates back to the 1970s, and its proximity to the city centre and surrounding commercial developments has contributed to its growth as a mature residential neighbourhood.

== History ==
The Seputeh station is listed as having opened in 1995, the same year KTM Komuter commenced operations in the Klang Valley as Malaysia's first electric commuter rail service.

The station subsequently became an important railway access point for the adjoining Mid Valley City development following the opening of Mid Valley Megamall in November 1999. During the initial years of the commercial development, Seputeh was the only nearby KTM Komuter station providing railway access to the shopping complex and its surrounding commercial area.

In August 2004, a newer Mid Valley Komuter station was opened closer to Mid Valley City. The station was constructed to provide more direct railway access to the shopping complex and its surrounding commercial developments, which had previously relied predominantly on road access. Its opening subsequently reduced the importance of Seputeh station as the primary railway access point for the commercial development.

Nevertheless, Seputeh station continues to serve the surrounding residential neighbourhood and remains an alternative railway access point for visitors travelling to Mid Valley Megamall and Mid Valley City.

== Station layout and facilities ==
The station is an at-grade railway facility comprising two side platforms serving two tracks. Its concourse is located at ground level and accommodates the fare gates, ticketing facilities and station control area. The platforms are connected by a pedestrian footbridge.

Facilities available at the station include ticket counters, ticket vending machines, a customer service office and public toilets. A Touch 'n Go lane is also listed among its ticketing facilities. Dedicated parking facilities are not listed as available at the station.

== Services ==
The station is served by KTM Komuter services operating along the Batu Caves–Pulau Sebang route. Northbound services travel towards Batu Caves via Mid Valley and Kuala Lumpur Sentral, while southbound services continue towards Pulau Sebang and Tampin via Salak Selatan, Bandar Tasik Selatan and Serdang.
