= KL Eco City =

- Mixed Development in Kuala Lumpur
- KL Eco City in July 2022
- Nickname: KLEC
- Interactive map of KL Eco City
- Coordinates: 3.118°N 101.673°E
- Country: Malaysia
- City: Kuala Lumpur
- District: Bangsar
- Status: Partially Completed
- Developer: KL Eco City Sdn. Bhd. (a subsidiary of SP Setia)

Area
  - Total: 10 ha (25 acres)
- Time zone: UTC+8 (Malaysia Standard Time)
- Postal code: 59200
- Website: www.klecocity.com

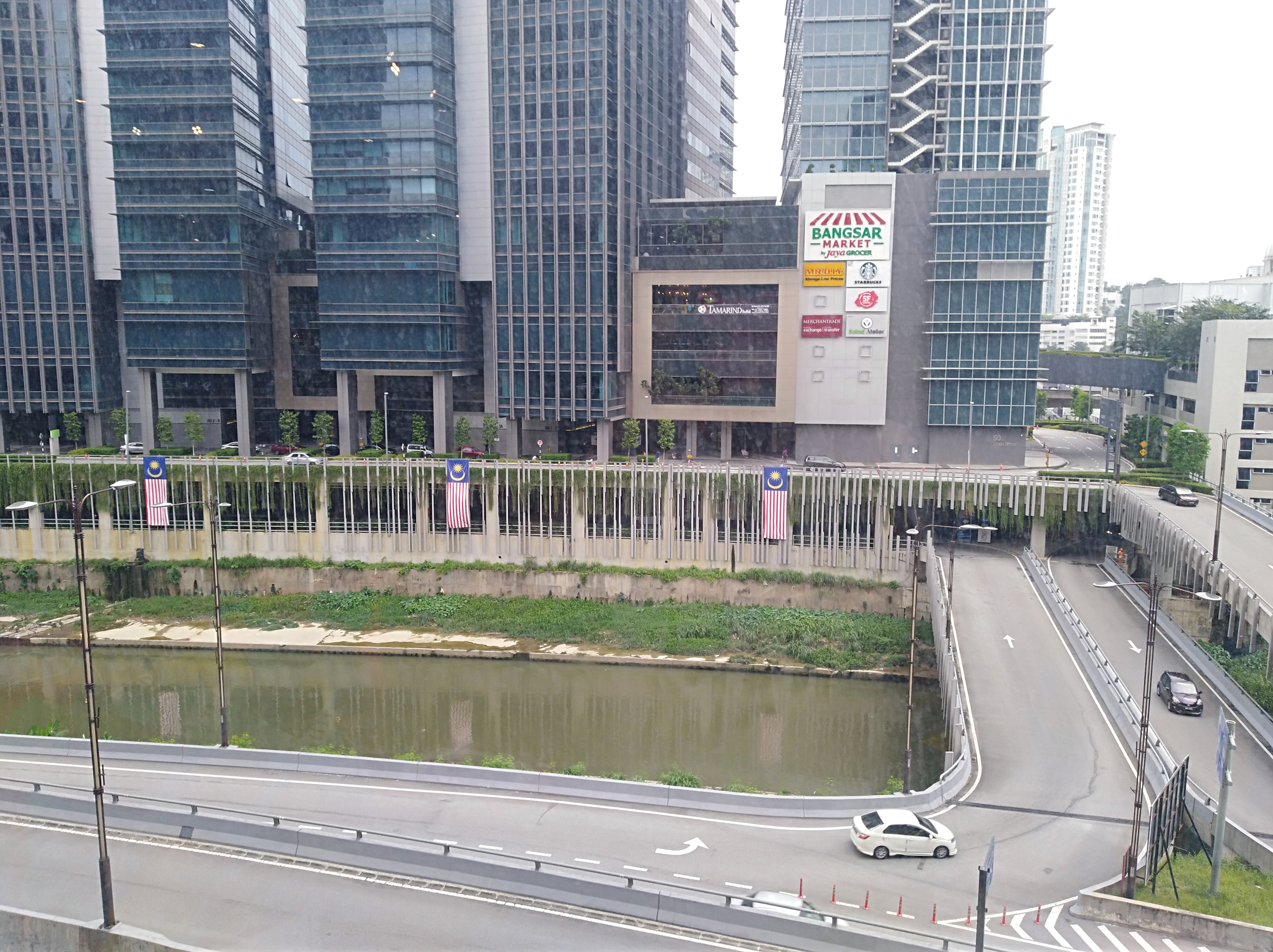
KL Eco City's boutique office blocks, known as The Pillars.

KL Eco City, or KLEC for short, is a 25-acre integrated mixed-use development project in the city of Kuala Lumpur, Malaysia. The project is built at the site of former Haji Abdullah Hukum Village. The mixed development project is helmed by S P Setia Berhad under a joint-venture agreement with the Kuala Lumpur City Hall (DBKL). It is built in stages comprising 3 residential towers, one serviced apartment tower, 3 corporate office towers, 12 boutique office blocks and a retail mall.

== Master plan ==
- Amari Hotel
- KL Eco City Integrated Rail Hub (LRT & KTM Abdullah Hukum stations)
- Retail Podium (KL Eco City Mall)
- Masjid Jamek Abdullah Hukum
- Mercu Aspire (Aspire Tower)
- Mercu 2 Corporate Tower (formerly Setia Tower)
- Mercu 3 Corporate Tower (formerly Menara DBKL)
- Strata Office Tower (Menara 1)
- The Pillars Boutique Office (BO1/2/3)
- ViiA Residences
- Residensi Vogue 1 (Vogue Suites One)
- Vogue Suites Two
- Vogue Suites Three

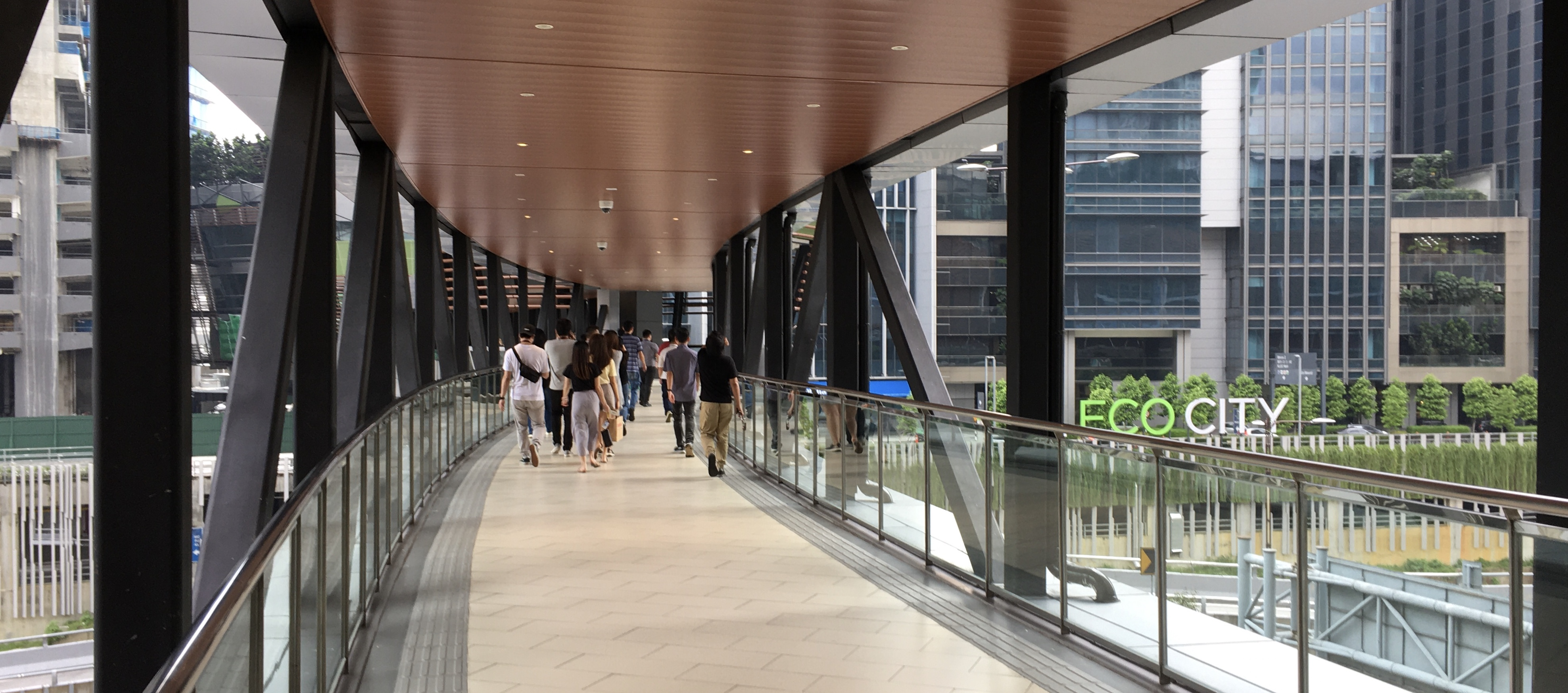
The pedestrian link bridge between KL Eco City and The Gardens towards the Abdullah Hukum station.

== Background and history ==
Haji Abdullah Hukum Village
- Village
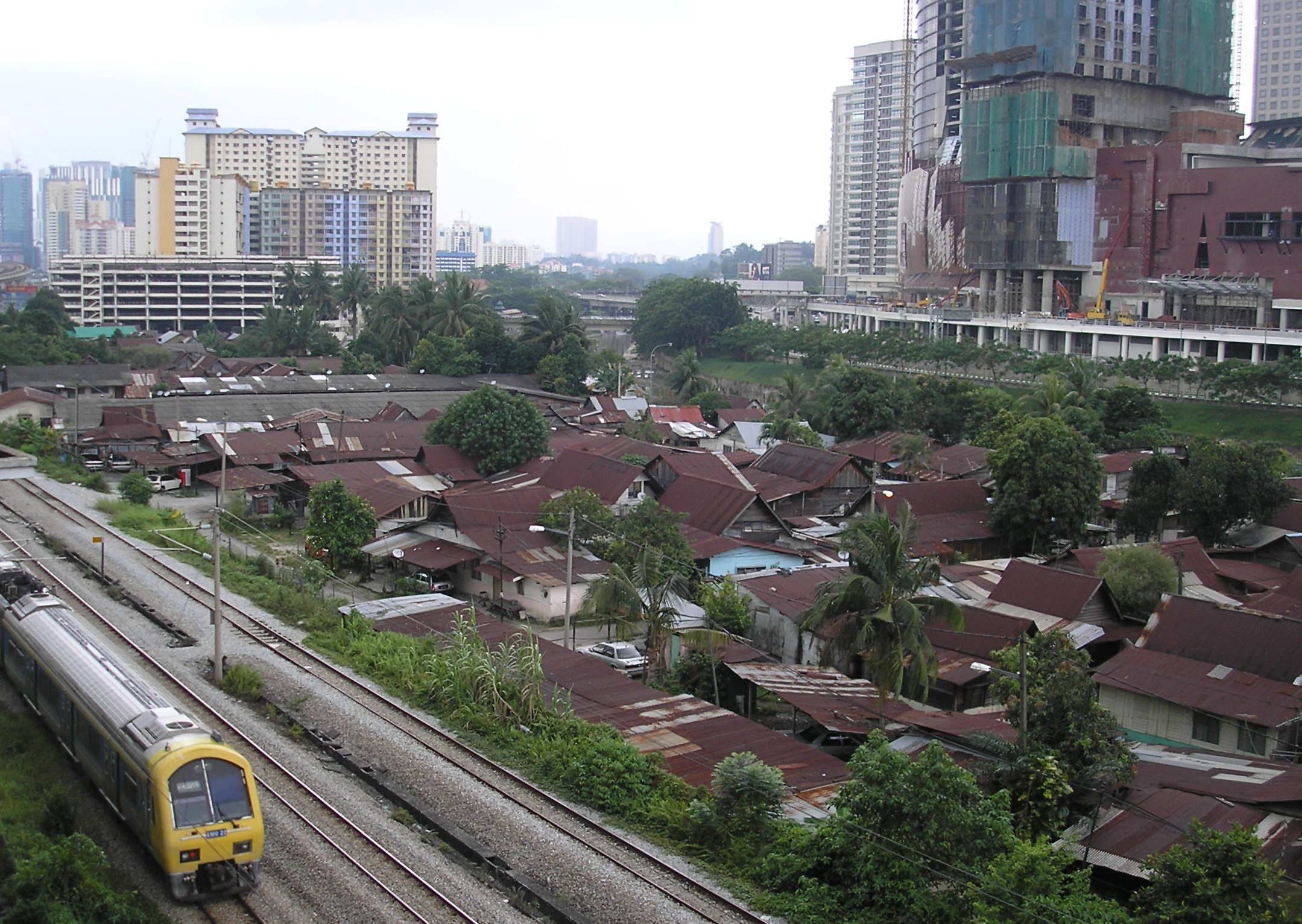
- The northern half of Haji Abdullah Hukum Village (as of August 2007), as seen from the Abdullah Hukum LRT station and with the incomplete Gardens shopping centre to the right. By 2008, much of the village was cleared away for a further expansion of the Mid Valley City development project.

- Location within Malaysia
- Coordinates: 3°7′5″N 101°40′26″E
- Country: Malaysia
- State: Federal Territory of Kuala Lumpur
- Constituency: Lembah Pantai
- Settled: Early 1800s
- Demolishment: 2008

Government
  - Local Authority: Dewan Bandaraya Kuala Lumpur
  - Mayor: Mhd Amin Nordin Abdul Aziz
- Time zone: UTC+8 (MST)

The Haji Abdullah Hukum Village was an urban village located in Kuala Lumpur, Malaysia. It was situated further south along Jalan Bangsar, between the Rapid KL Kelana Jaya Line station named after the village (See: Abdullah Hukum LRT station and Abdullah Hukum Komuter station) and the Klang River. Its area is surrounded by Bangsar, Mid Valley City and Kerinchi.

=== History of the village ===
Haji Abdullah Hukum Village was one of Kuala Lumpur's early Malay settlements, with a 200-year-old history.

The village was named after Haji Abdullah Hukum, whose given name was Muhammad Rukun Hukum. He came to Malaya from Sumatera, Indonesia at the age of 15 with his father back in the 19th century. To earn a living, he worked as a farmer and a laborer before he started opening lands and villages with the consent of Raja Laut, who was then the Raja Muda (crown prince) of Selangor.

Abdullah was later chosen by Raja Laut to head a mosque in Pudu. He was also given the authority to start a nursery in Bukit Nanas and to open a village in Sungai Putih (now Jalan Bangsar). After retiring, he continued to stay in the village in Sungai Putih which is now known as Haji Abdullah Hukum Village located just opposite the well known Mid Valley Megamall in Kuala Lumpur.

Despite initially starting as a Malay settlement, the village boasts a multiracial population of ethnic Malays, Chinese and Indians. There is even a Hindu temple, Sri Sakthi Nageswary Temple, located within the village close by a highway overpass.

=== Development ===
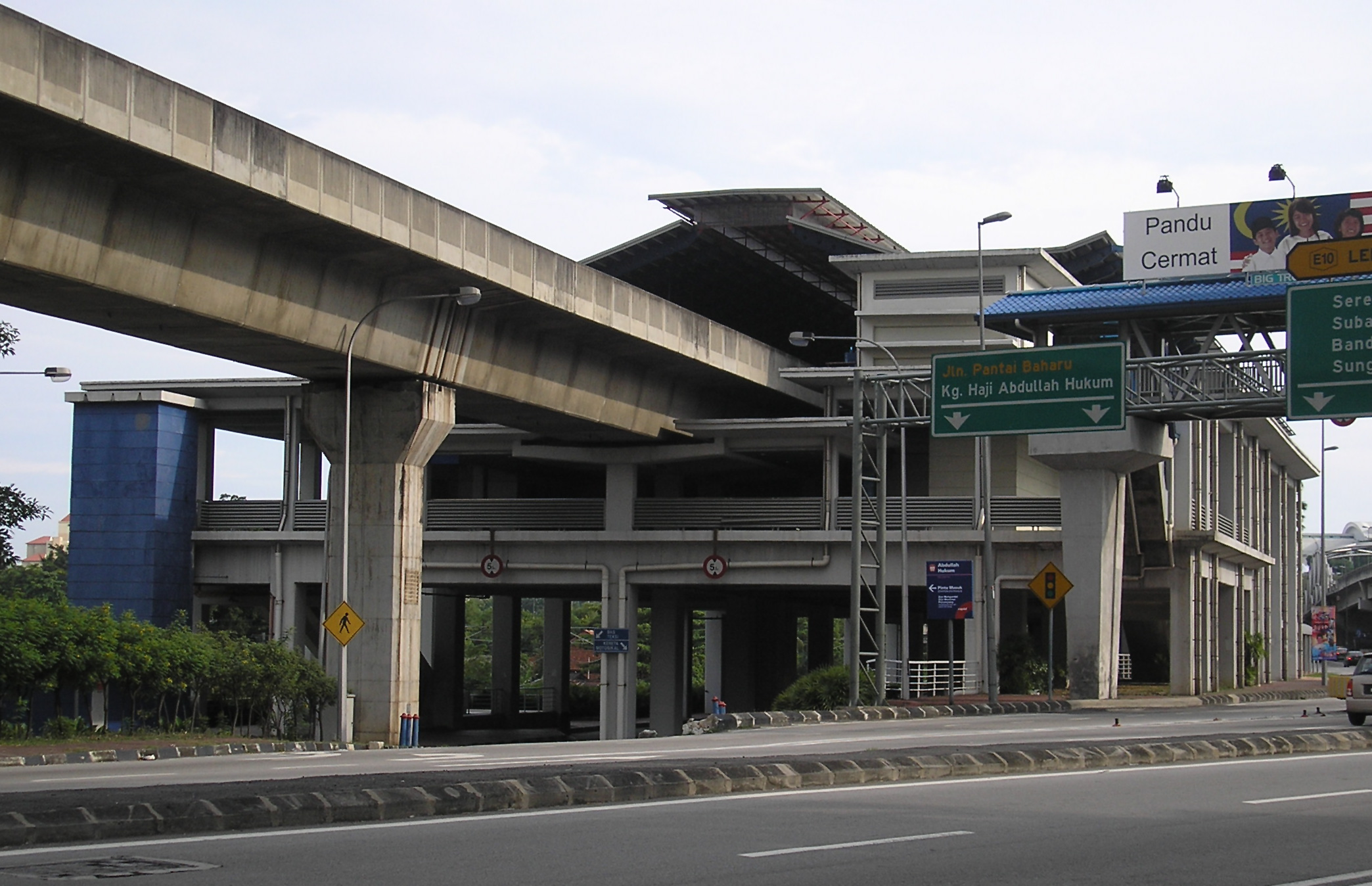
The Abdullah Hukum station is an elevated LRT station next to the village it is named after and is a source of transport to the residents in the area.

In 2007, it was reported that the 200-year-old Haji Abdullah Hukum Village has been earmarked for development. The village has been marked for a major development comprising numerous condominiums, office blocks, shopping complexes and even a transit hub.

== Accidents and incidents ==
On the 30th of November 2016, a 70-meter long pedestrian bridge linking the complex to the Gardens Mall that was under construction collapsed at around 3:30pm local time. The collapse killed a Vietnamese construction worker and injured 6 others. All of the injured were treated at University of Malaya Medical Centre. Following the collapse of the bridge, the department has instructed a stop-work order at the construction site to allow investigations to take place.

== Public transportation ==
KL Eco City is served by the Abdullah Hukum on the KTM Tanjung Malim-Port Klang Line and LRT Kelana Jaya Line.

A pedestrian link bridge connects KL Eco City and Mid Valley City, where commuters can also access the Mid Valley station on the KTM Batu Caves-Pulau Sebang Line.

== See also ==
- Bangsar South
- KL Metropolis
- Setia Alam
