= Bangsar LRT station =

LRT station in Bangsar, Kuala Lumpur, Malaysia

Coordinates: 3.1567°N 101.7017°E

KJ16 Bangsar – Bank Rakyat
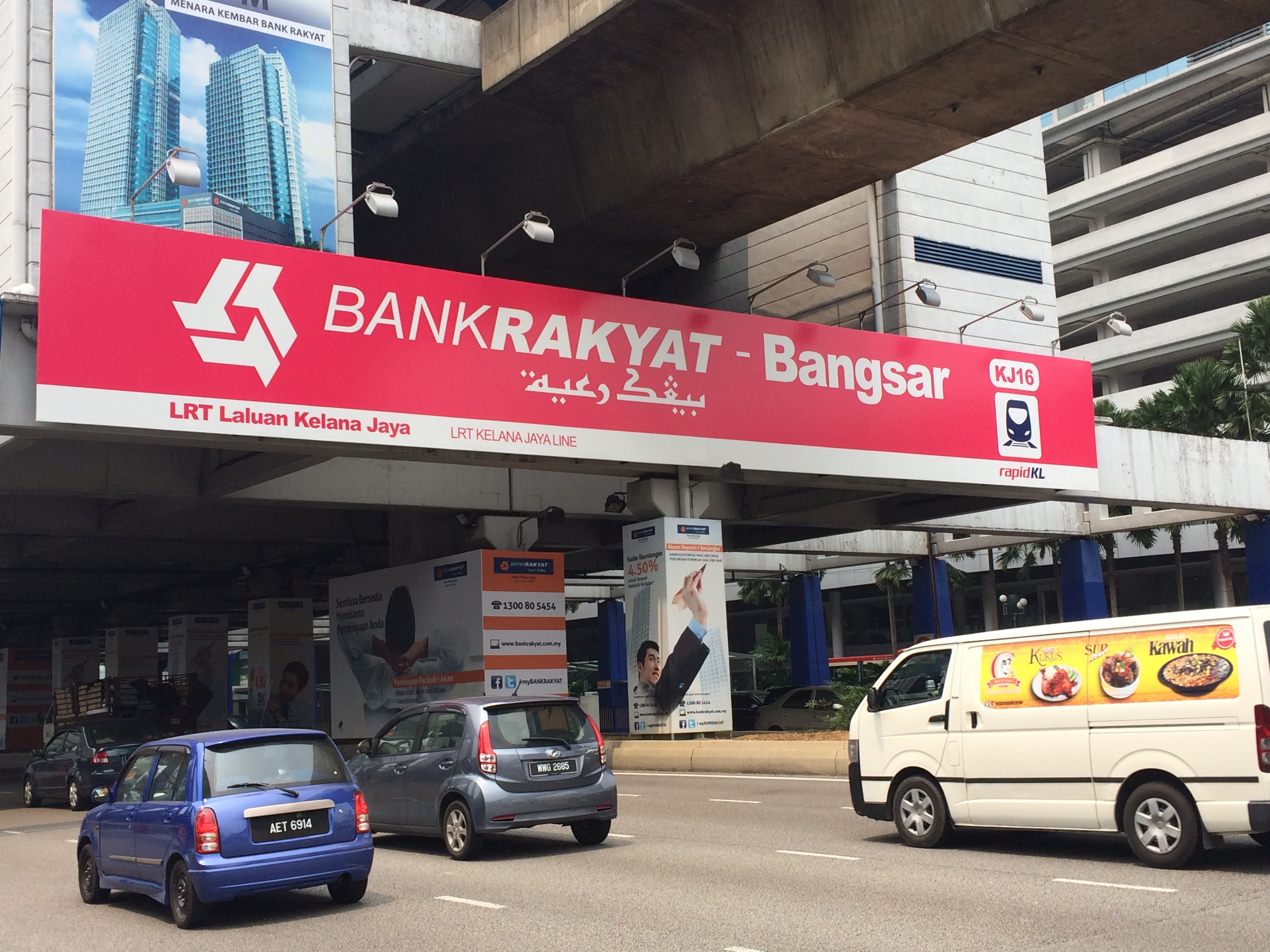
- View of the station from Jalan Bangsar in 2015

General information
- Other names: Malay: بڠسر (Jawi); Chinese: 孟沙; Tamil: பங்சார்
- Location: Jalan Bangsar, Bangsar; 59000 Kuala Lumpur; Malaysia
- System: Rapid KL
- Owner: Prasarana Malaysia
- Operator: Rapid Rail
- Line: 5 Kelana Jaya Line
- Platforms: 2 side platforms
- Tracks: 2

Construction
- Structure type: Elevated
- Parking: Not available
- Cycle facilities: Not available
- Accessible: Available

Other information
- Status: Operational
- Station code: KJ16

History
- Opened: 1 September 1998; 28 years ago

Services
Preceding station		Following station
KL Sentral towards Gombak	Kelana Jaya Line	Abdullah Hukum towards Putra Heights
Location

The Bangsar LRT station, also known as Bangsar–Bank Rakyat LRT station under the station naming rights programme, is an elevated light rapid transit (LRT) located directly above Jalan Bangsar Bangsar, Kuala Lumpur, Malaysia. The station is served by the Kelana Jaya Line which is part of the Klang Valley Integrated Transit System.

The station's name is derived from the surrounding locality, as well as the road below it. Despite its name, it is located some distance away from the Bangsar town centre.

== History ==
The Bangsar LRT station was opened on 1 September 1998 as part of the line's first phase of operations from Kelana Jaya to Pasar Seni.

In October 2015, the station was renamed to Bank Rakyat-Bangsar after Bank Rakyat was given naming rights by Prasarana Malaysia, and is the one of three stations under the pilot phase of the station naming rights programme since its launch. Since mid of 2026, the station has been renamed to the current Bangsar–Bank Rakyat to standardize the sponsor names being placed after the station name.

== Facilities ==
There is a facility for reloading the Touch 'n Go card at the Bank Rakyat and Maybank ATMs in this station.

== Station features ==
The station adopts the standard elevated station design on most of the original Kelana Jaya Line, with two side platforms above the concourse level.

=== Layout ===
L2	Aras platform	Side platform, doors will open on the left
L2	Aras platform	→ Platform 1: 5 Kelana Jaya Line towards KJ01 Gombak (KL Sentral)
L2	Aras platform	← Platform 2: 5 Kelana Jaya Line towards KJ37 Putra Heights (Abdullah Hukum)
L2	Aras platform	Side platform, doors will open on the left
L1	Concourse	Faregates to paid area, ticketing machines, customer service counter, shops, and direct access to Menara UOA
G	Ground	Entrance, bus stops, taxi and private vehicle lay-by

== Bus services ==
The Bangsar LRT station is well served by bus services, both trunk as well as feeder bus services. The bus stops are located at street level on either side of Jalan Bangsar and serve many routes, especially those between Kuala Lumpur and the western Klang Valley townships of Petaling Jaya, Shah Alam and Klang.

=== Trunk buses ===
Route No.	Origin	Destination	Via	Connecting to
750	KJ14 KG16 Pasar Seni Hub	UiTM Shah Alam		708, 753, 754, T750, T751, T752, T753, T754
751	KJ14 KG16 Pasar Seni Hub	Taman Sri Muda, Shah Alam		702, T756, BET4
772	KJ14 KG16 Pasar Seni Hub	Subang Suria		T802, T803
780	KJ14 KG16 Pasar Seni Hub	Section 8, Kota Damansara		T801, BET1
782	KJ14 KG16 Pasar Seni Hub	Petaling Jaya Old Town Terminal		781, T640, PJ01
821	KJ14 KG16 Pasar Seni Hub	Pantai Hill Park; Pantai Dalam		T791
822	KJ14 KG16 Pasar Seni Hub	Bangsar Park	Mid Valley Megamall	T817
BET3	KJ14 KG16 Pasar Seni Hub	Subang Mewah, USJ 1	New Pantai Expressway	770, 771, T776
BET4	KJ14 KG16 Pasar Seni Hub	Taman Sri Muda, Shah Alam	New Pantai Expressway	702, 751, T756

=== Feeder buses ===
Route No.	Origin	Desitination	Via
T850	KJ16 Bangsar	KG14 Semantan; Pusat Bandar Damansara	Jalan Bangsar Utama 1 Lorong Maarof; Jalan Maarof; Jalan Johar; Jalan Semantan; Jalan Dungun; Jalan Gelenggang; Jalan Damanlela

=== Express bus routes ===
FirstCoach, an express bus service to Singapore departs from Lengkok Abdullah, nearby the LRT station.

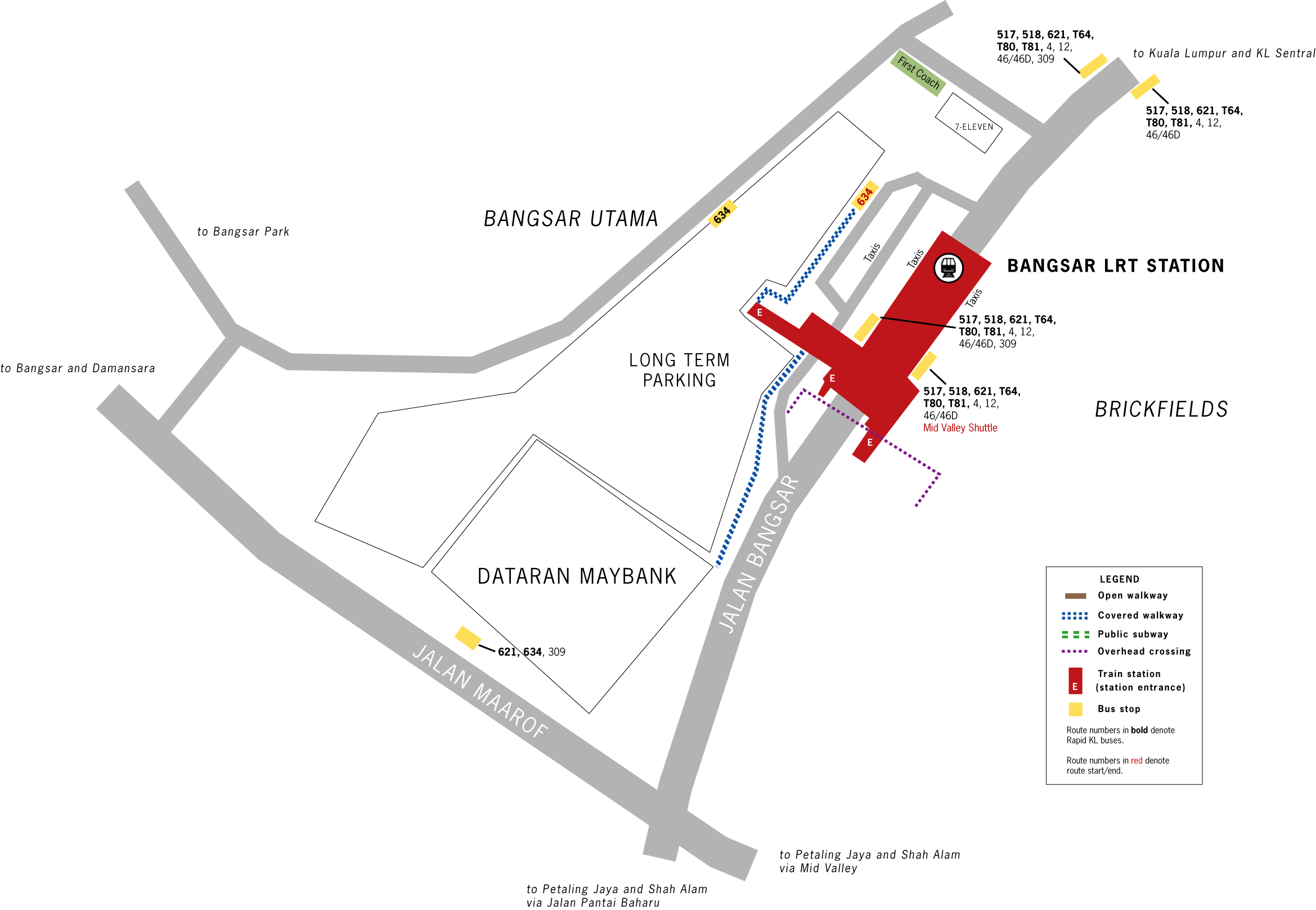

== Gallery ==
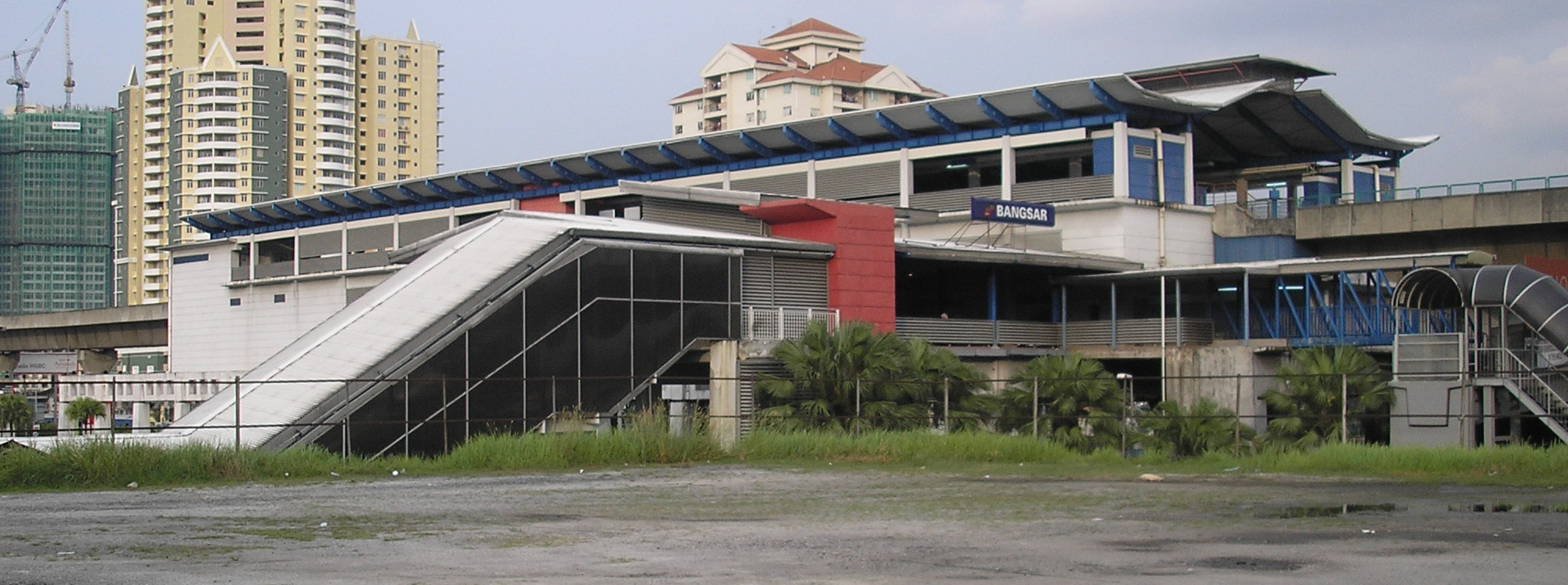
The exterior view of the station in 2007 from the Dataran Maybank construction site

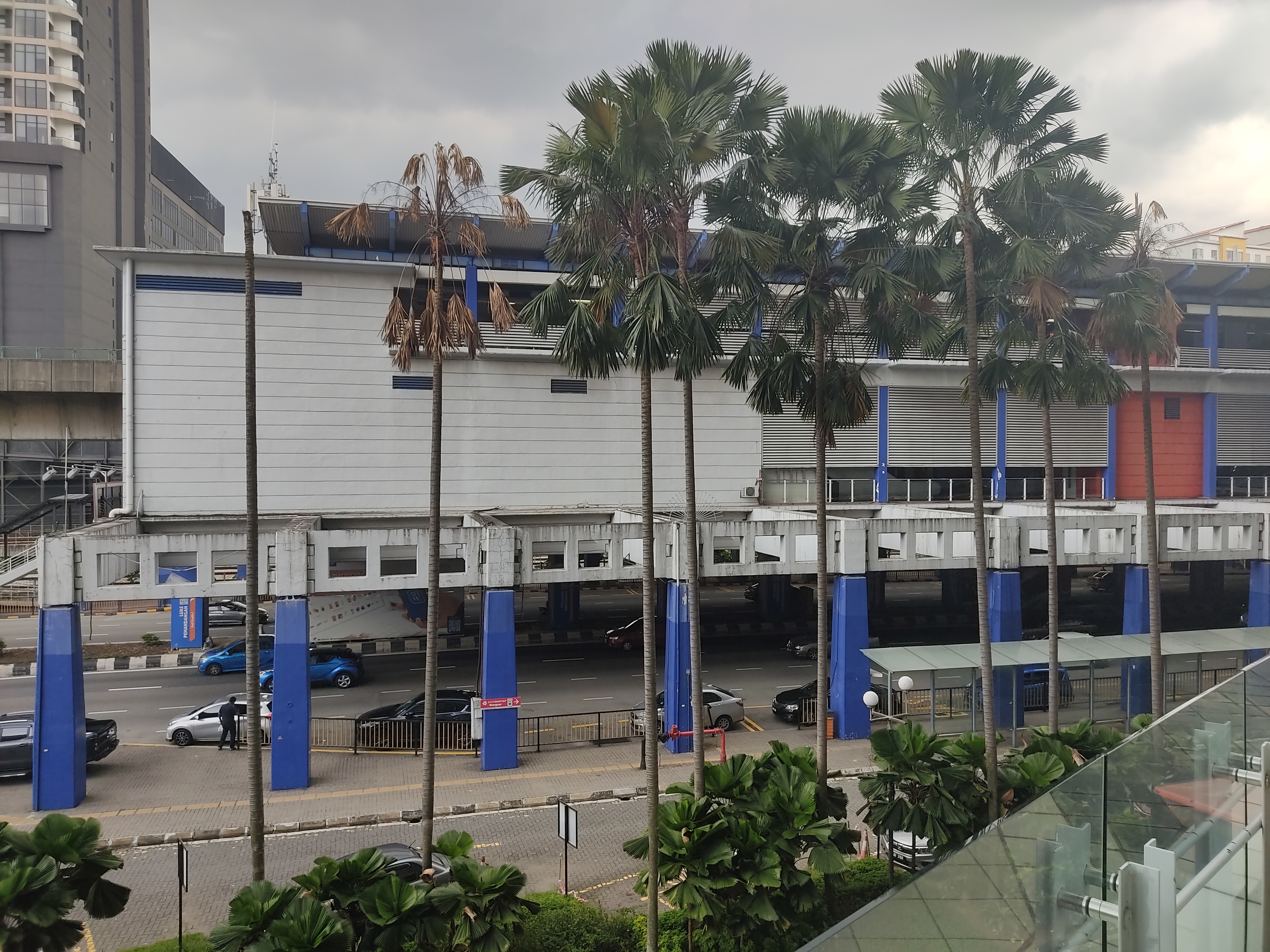
Exterior view of the station (2021)

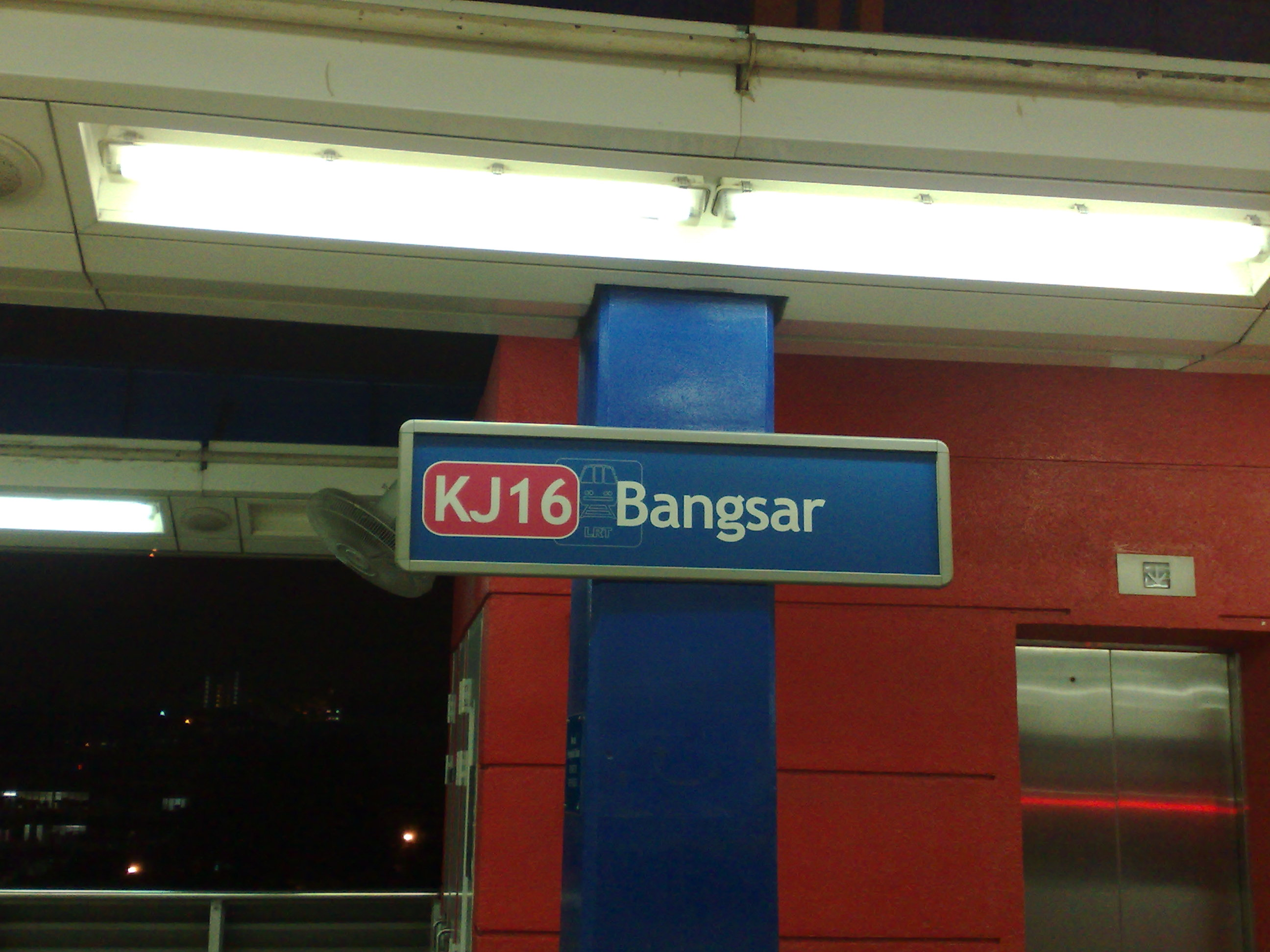
The station's old name board on the platform

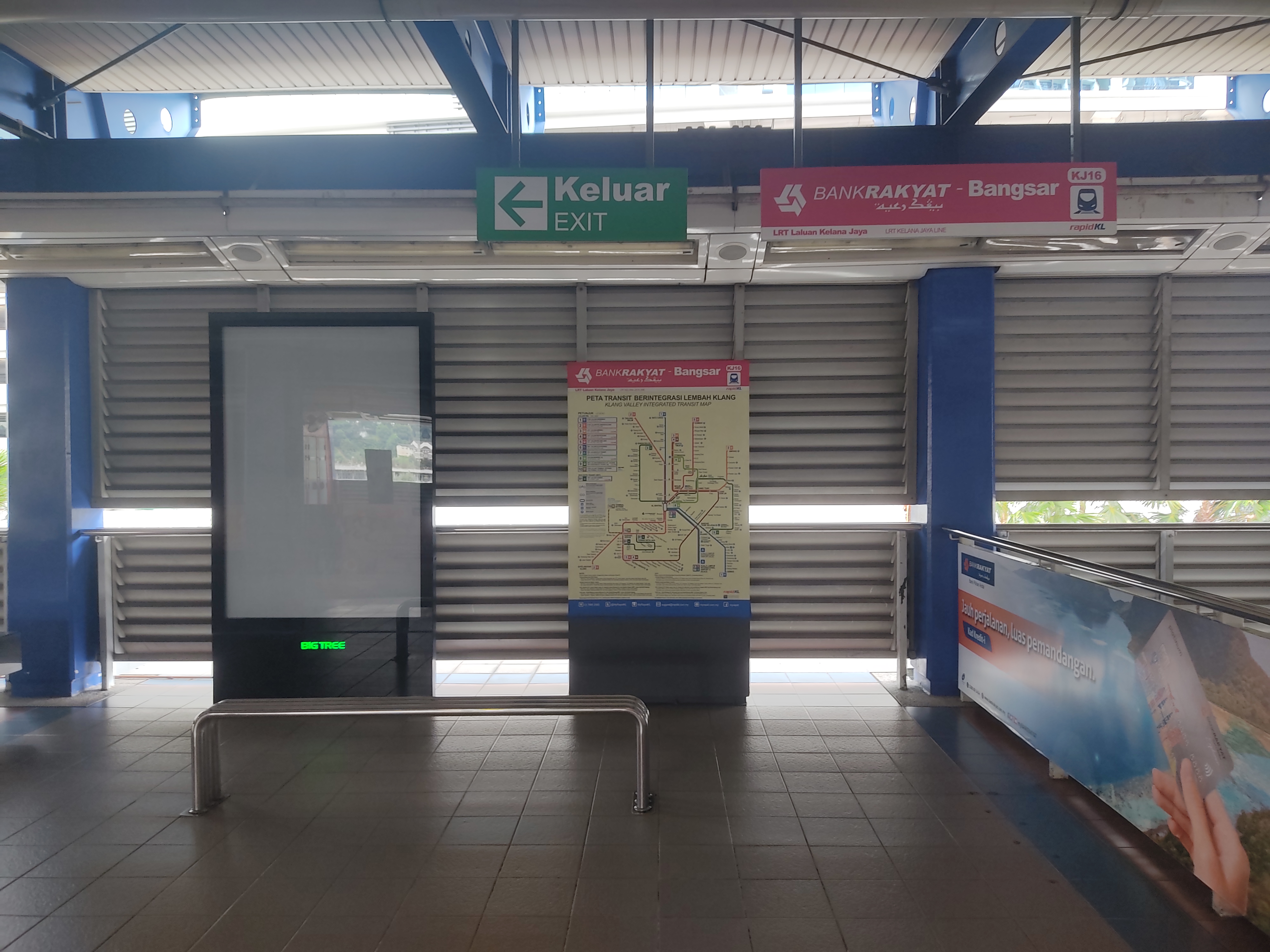
View of the station's platform area (2021)

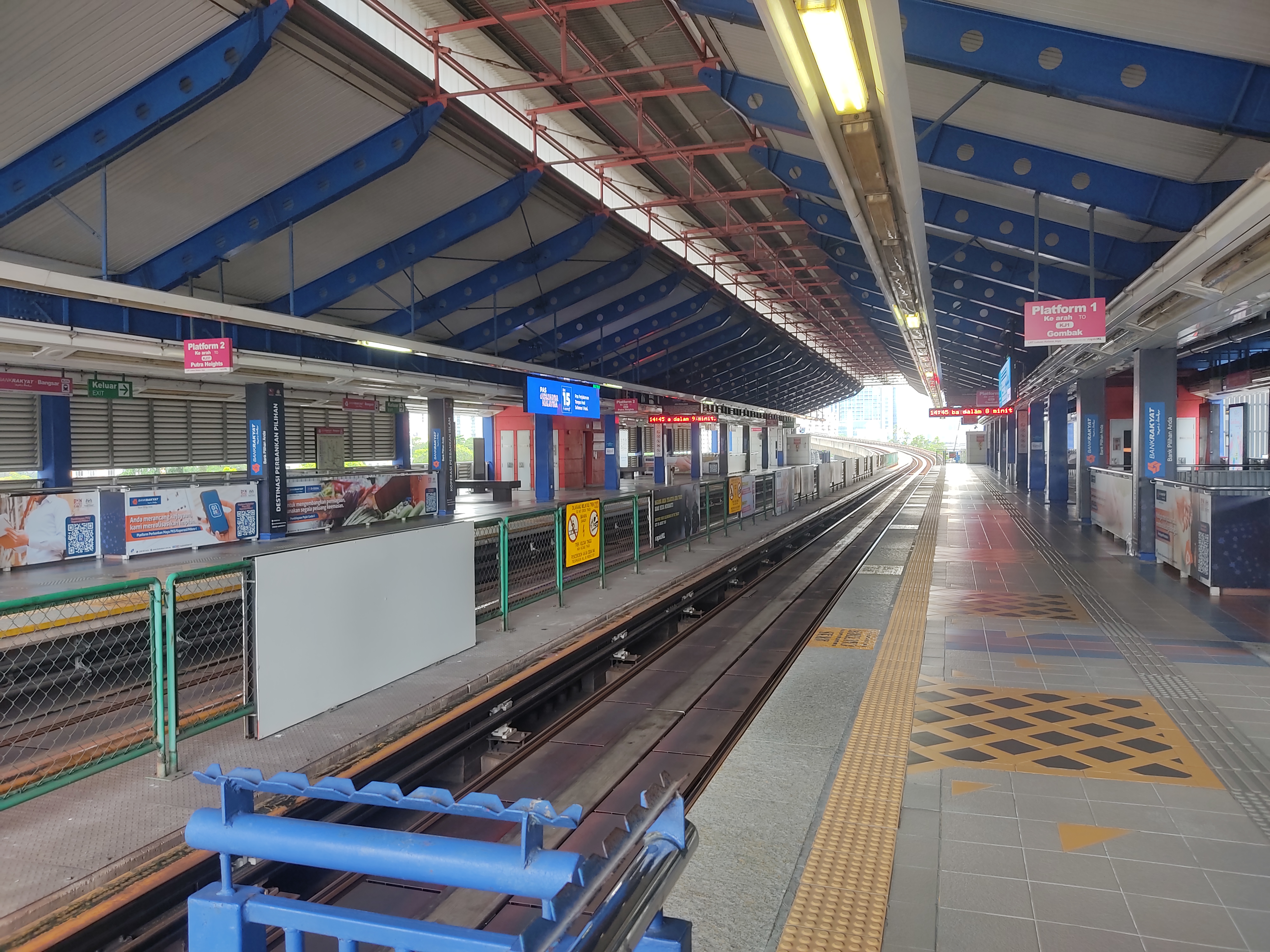
View of the station's platform (2021)
