= Abdullah Hukum station =

Train station in Kuala Lumpur, Malaysia

KD01 KJ17 Abdullah Hukum
- View of the exterior of the station

General information
- Other names: Malay: عبداللّٰه حكوم (Jawi); Chinese: 阿都拉胡坤; Tamil: அப்துல்லா உக்கும்
- Location: Jalan Bangsar, Kampung Haji Abdullah Hukum; 59200 Kuala Lumpur; Malaysia
- Coordinates: 3°7′7″N 101°40′22″E
- System: Rapid KL (LRT)
- Owner: Prasarana Malaysia (LRT); Railway Assets Corporation (KTM)
- Operator: Rapid Rail (LRT); Keretapi Tanah Melayu (KTM)
- Lines: 2 Tanjung Malim–Port Klang Line; 5 Kelana Jaya Line
- Platforms: 2 side platforms (LRT); 1 side platform & 1 island platform (KTM)
- Tracks: 2 (LRT); 3 (KTM)
- Connections: Pedestrian bridge to KL Eco City, Mid Valley City and The Gardens Mall, and subsequently to KB01 Mid Valley

Construction
- Structure type: KJ17 Elevated; KD01 At-grade
- Parking: Not available
- Cycle facilities: Not available
- Accessible: Available

Other information
- Station code: KD01 KJ17

History
- Opened: 1 September 1998; 27 years ago (LRT); 28 October 2018; 7 years ago (KTM)

Services
Preceding station		Following station
Bangsar towards Gombak	Kelana Jaya Line	Kerinchi towards Putra Heights
Preceding station	Keretapi Tanah Melayu (Komuter)	Following station
Kuala Lumpur Sentral towards Tanjung Malim	Tanjung Malim–Port Klang Line	Angkasapuri towards Port Klang
Location

The Abdullah Hukum station is an integrated light rapid transit (LRT) and commuter rail station in Kuala Lumpur, Malaysia, served by both the LRT Kelana Jaya Line and KTM Komuter's Tanjung Malim-Port Klang Line.

The station consists of the elevated LRT station which was opened on 1 September 1998, together with a ground level KTM Komuter station which was constructed later as part of the KL Eco City development and is physically integrated with the LRT station. The KTM Komuter station began operations on 28 October 2018.

== Name ==
In the 1980s, there was a small halt named Taman Ghazali railway station at the present Abdullah Hukum station's site, mostly for freight services and also served the former KTM railbus service before assuming its current name.

== Station features ==
=== Location ===
The station is located between Jalan Bangsar and the KL Eco City development to the south of the central business district of Kuala Lumpur. The station is named after the former Kampung Haji Abdullah Hukum, a village which was located between Jalan Bangsar and the Klang River, which has now become the KL Eco City development.

Besides KL Eco City, another major landmark near the Abdullah Hukum station is the Tenaga Nasional headquarters which is located across Jalan Bangsar from the station.

=== LRT station ===
The LRT station is an elevated station that was built as part of the Kelana Jaya Line, then known as the PUTRA LRT. It was one of the 10 stations which were opened on 1 September 1998 when Phase One between Kelana Jaya and Pasar Seni station (excluding the KL Sentral which opened later) began operations. The station is of the standard Kelana Jaya Line elevated station design, with two elevated floors – a concourse level and two side platforms above the concourse level – above the ground floor. The ground floor and station entrance is used as a kiss and ride and taxi drop-off area.

=== KTM Komuter station ===
The KTM Komuter station is the newer section of the Abdullah Hukum station complex and was built as part of the KL Eco City development located adjacent to Keretapi Tanah Melayu's (KTM) Port Klang branch line of the West Coast Line. The station, which began operations on 28 October 2018, lies between KL Sentral and Angkasapuri stations. Construction of the station began in 2014 by KL Eco City's developer KL Eco City Sdn Bhd, a subsidiary of the Malaysian developer SP Setia, on 0.6 hectares of land owned by the Railway Assets Corporation, the owner of all assets operated by KTM.

A common concourse level above the ground level links both the KTM and LRT stations. The upper road level of KL Eco City can also be accessed via an exit at this common concourse level, where the drop-off lay-bys for the station are located. The station's two side platforms are located at the ground level while the level above the concourse (second level from ground) provides the connection to KL Eco City and Mid Valley City.

=== Connectivity to Mid Valley City ===
Despite its relative close proximity, there was no proper connection for many years from the Abdullah Hukum station to Mid Valley City which lies just 250 metres east. Prior to the construction of KL Eco City and the KTM station, pedestrians from the LRT station had to walk northwards along Jalan Bangsar to a pedestrian bridge and cross the railway tracks to the Putra Ria Apartment complex, then along the apartment access road and another pedestrian bridge into Mid Valley City. Alternatively, it was easier for commuters to use the Mid Valley Komuter station on the Batu Caves–Pulau Sebang Line to reach Mid Valley City.

With the KTM Komuter station built, a dedicated footbridge was constructed to link Mid Valley City and Level 2 of the station through KL Eco City and the Gardens Mall. The section of the bridge between the station and KL Eco City was opened together with the opening of the KTM station. The section between KL Eco City and Mid Valley City over the Klang River subsequently opened on 14 November 2019.

== Bus services ==
Route No.	Origin	Destination	Connecting to
750	KJ14 KG16 Pasar Seni Hub	UiTM Shah Alam	708, 753, 754, T750, T752, T753, T754
751	KJ14 KG16 Pasar Seni Hub	Taman Sri Muda, Shah Alam	702, T756, BET4
772	KJ14 KG16 Pasar Seni Hub	KS03 Terminal Skypark (Subang Airport); Subang Suria	T802, T803
780	KJ14 KG16 Pasar Seni Hub	Section 8, Kota Damansara	T801, BET1

== Gallery ==
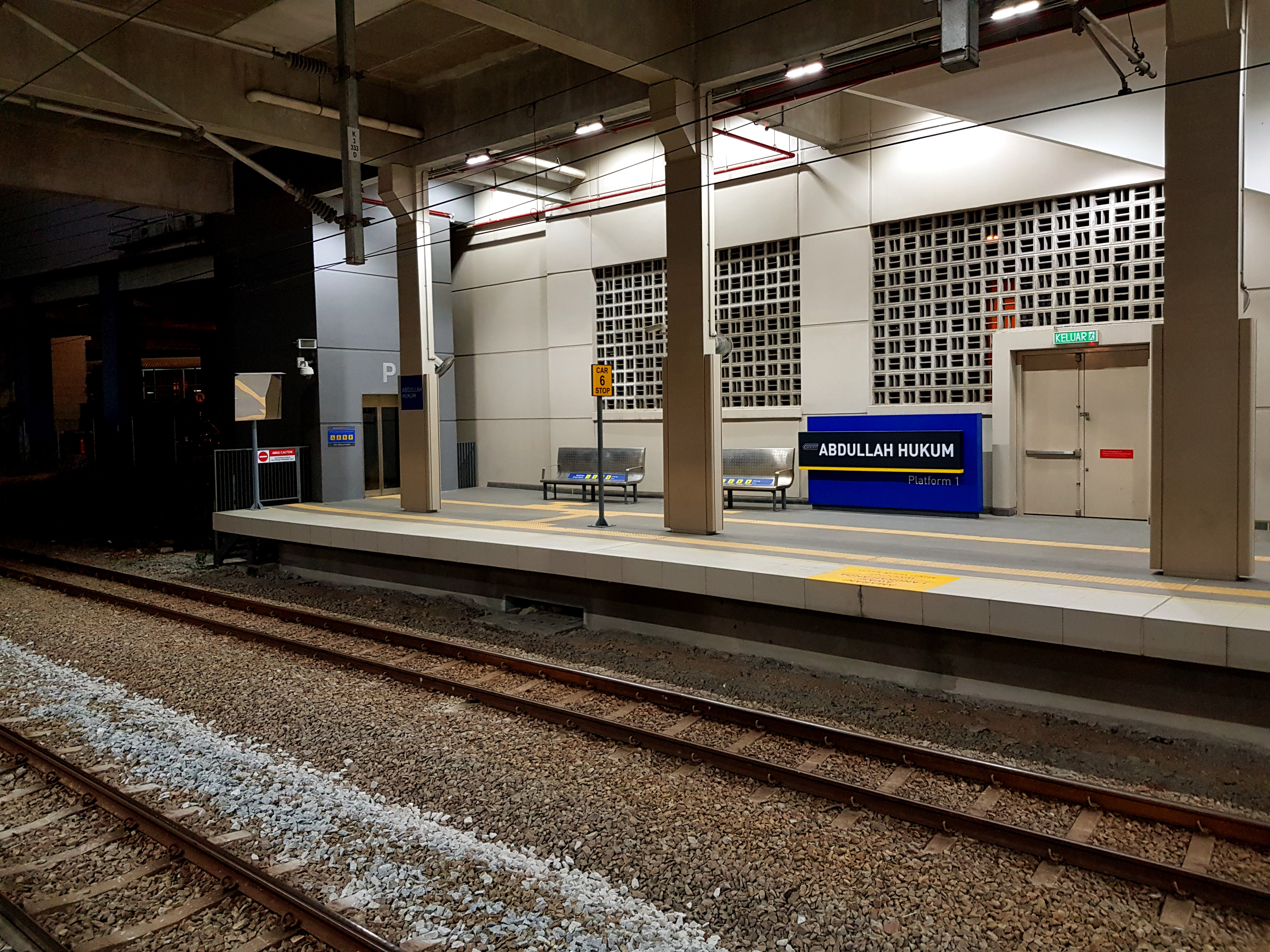
View of the platform of the new KTM station

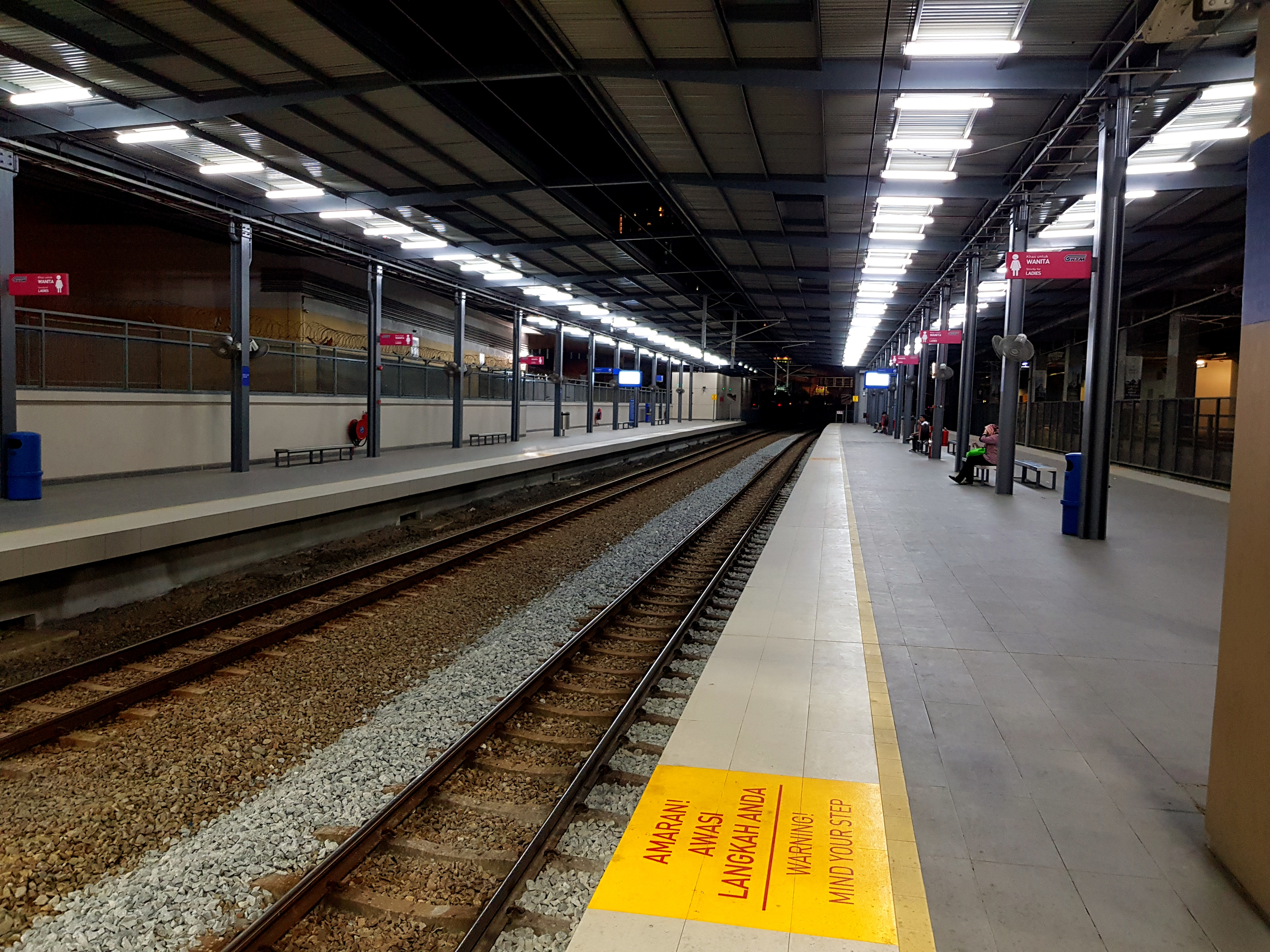
New KTM station platform

Exterior view of the LRT station

Main entrance of the LRT station

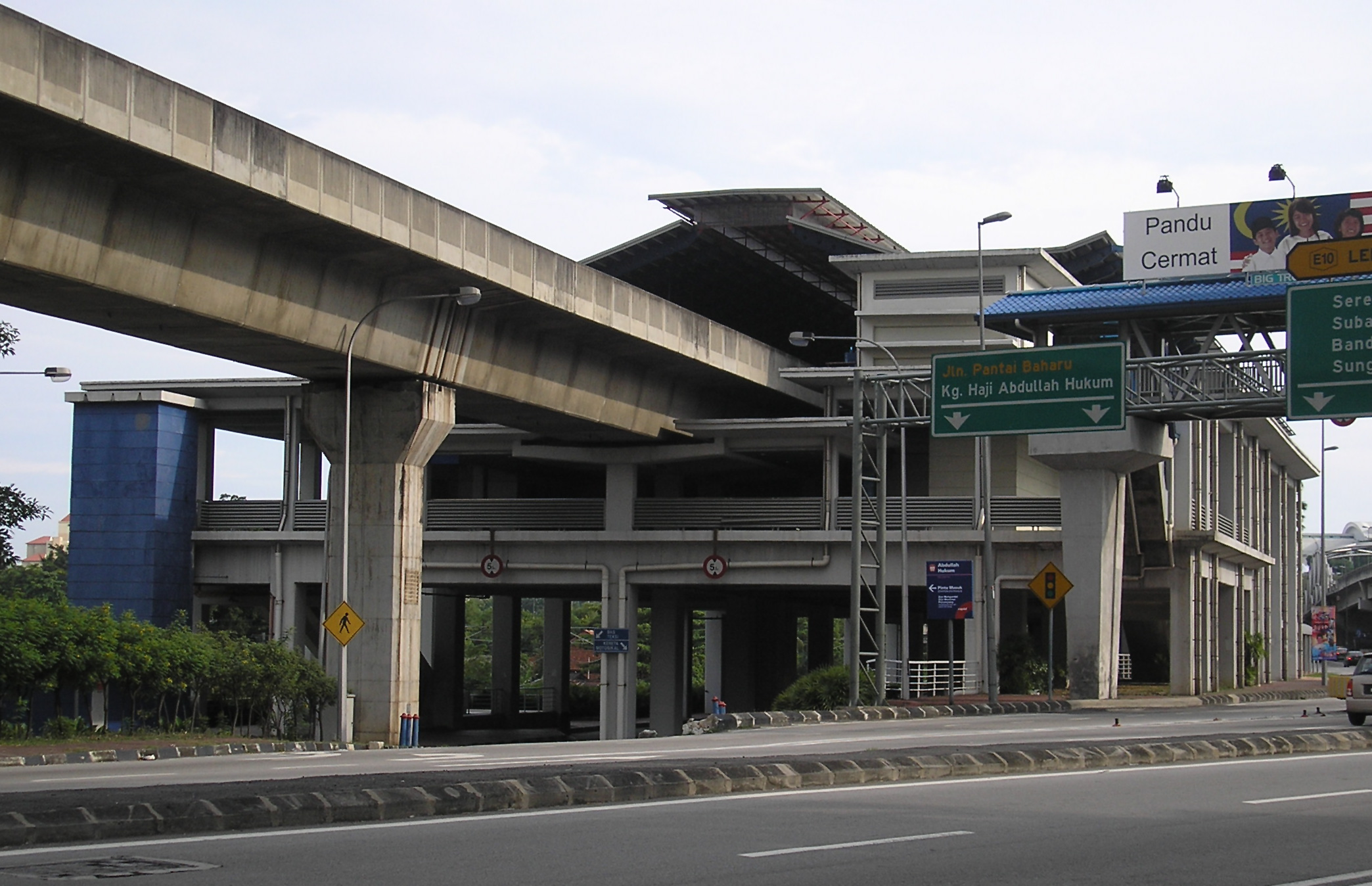
The LRT station is fashioned to be elevated above an access roadway, similar to Bangsar

Platform view of the LRT station

== See also ==
- Subang Jaya station
