= Universiti LRT station =

Train station in Kuala Lumpur, Malaysia

Coordinates: 3°06′52″N 101°39′42″E

KJ19 CC32 Universiti
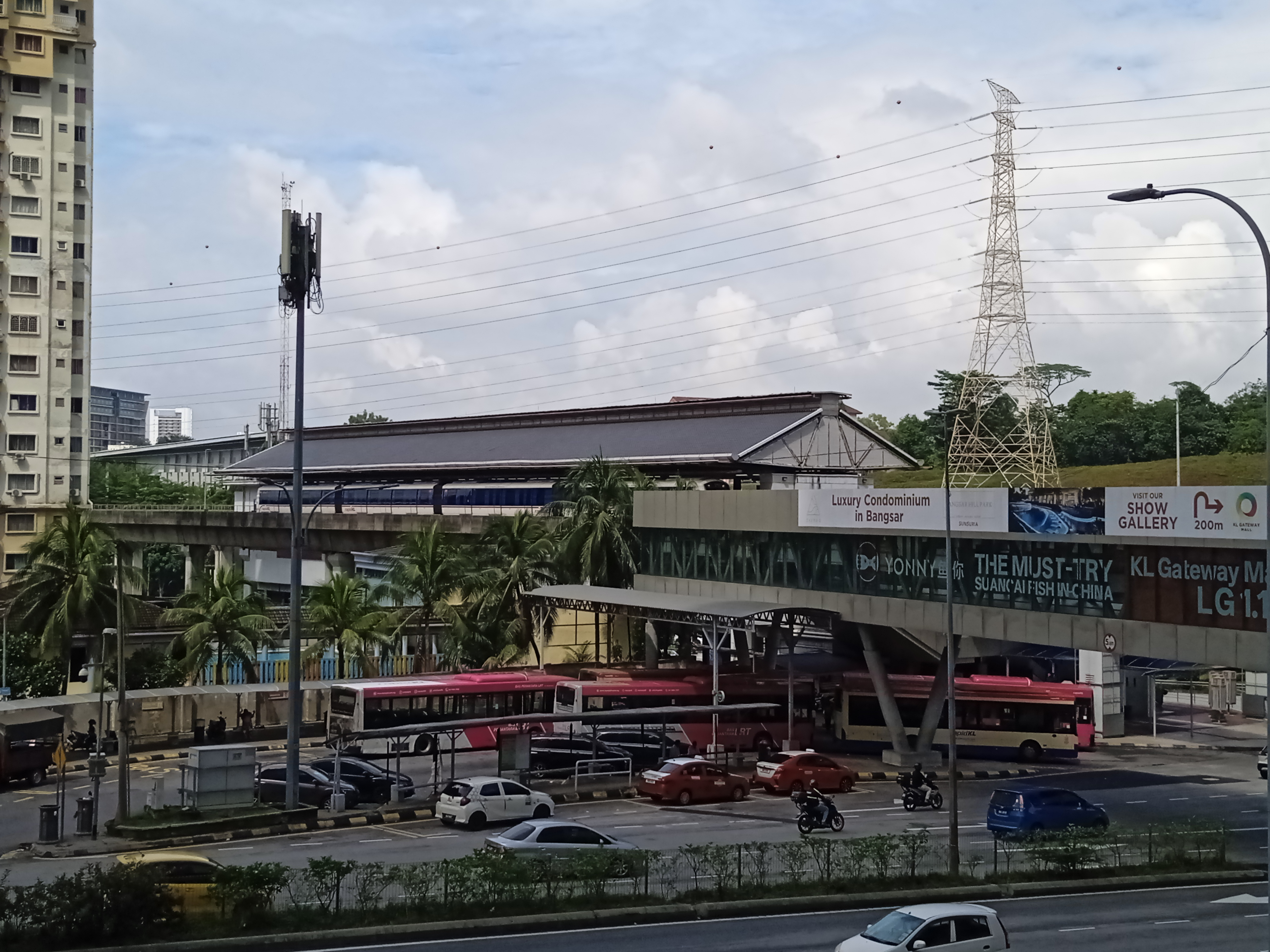
- Exterior view of University LRT station from KL Gateway Mall

General information
- Other names: Malay: اونيۏرسيتي (Jawi); Chinese: 大学; Tamil: யுனிவர்சிட்டி
- Location: Jalan Kerinchi, Kampung Kerinchi; 59200 Kuala Lumpur; Malaysia
- System: Rapid KL
- Owner: Prasarana Malaysia (LRT); MRT Corp (MRT)
- Lines: 5 Kelana Jaya Line; 13 Circle Line (future)
- Platforms: 1 island platform
- Tracks: 2

Construction
- Structure type: Elevated
- Parking: Not available
- Cycle facilities: Available. 20 bicycle bays.
- Accessible: Available

Other information
- Status: Operational
- Station code: KJ19 CC32

History
- Opened: 1 September 1998; 27 years ago (LRT)
- Opening: 2032; 6 years' time (MRT)
- Former names: KL Gateway–Universiti (2015–2021)

Services
| Preceding station | | Following station |
|---|---|---|
| Kerinchi towards Gombak | Kelana Jaya Line | Taman Jaya towards Putra Heights |
| UM Clockwise / outer | Circle Line Future service | Pantai Permai Anticlockwise / inner |
Location

The Universiti LRT station is a light rapid transit (LRT) elevated station in Kampung Kerinchi, Kuala Lumpur, served by the LRT Kelana Jaya Line, named as such as it is the main transit station serving the University of Malaya.

The station is planned as a future interchange with the upcoming MRT Circle Line of the KVMRT project.

== Location and locality ==
This station is located on Jalan Kerinchi, beside the eastbound carriageway (Klang-bound) of the Federal Highway with one exit facing the KL Gateway Mall and another facing an exit ramp into the Federal Highway from Jalan Kerinchi. A pedestrian bridge connects the station with the mall across Jalan Kerinchi.

This station serves the local population of the University of Malaya and neighbouring Kampung Kerinchi, Bangsar South, Pantai Dalam and Pantai Hill Park.

== Station naming rights program ==
The station was renamed to KL Gateway–Universiti after Suez Capital, a local property developer, was given naming rights by Prasarana Malaysia. The KL Gateway area is a major redevelopment of the Kampung Kerinchi area which is served by the LRT station, now feature premium residential buildings, a shopping mall and the Menara Suezcap office tower.

It is the first of three stations under pilot program of station naming rights which was launched in October 2015. Nonetheless, the contract was presumed to be terminated in 2021 as all signs bearing the KL Gateway prefix were removed from the station. Likewise, station announcements on the trains do not include the prefix as of March 2022.

== Gallery ==
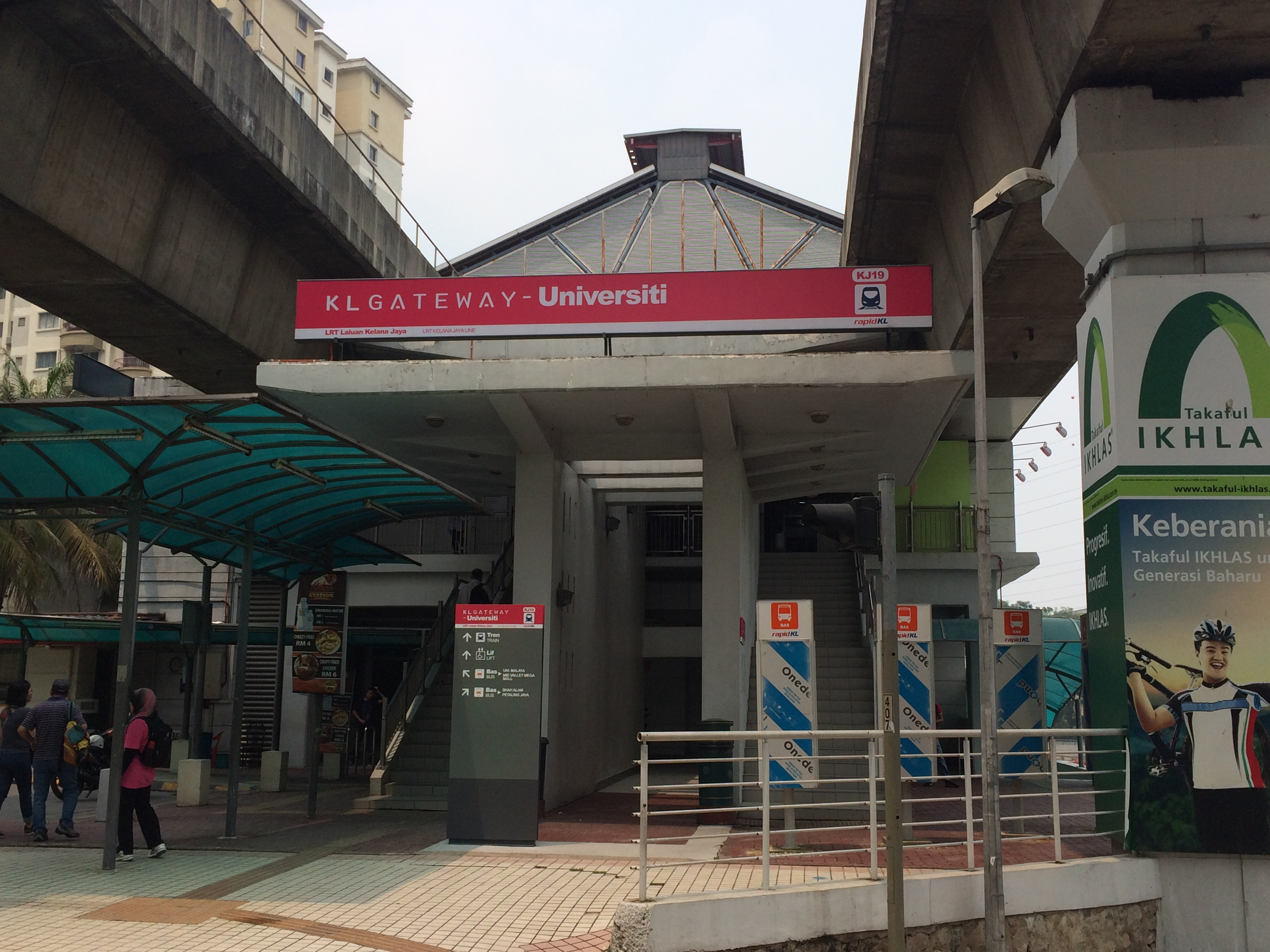
Station's main entrance (2015)

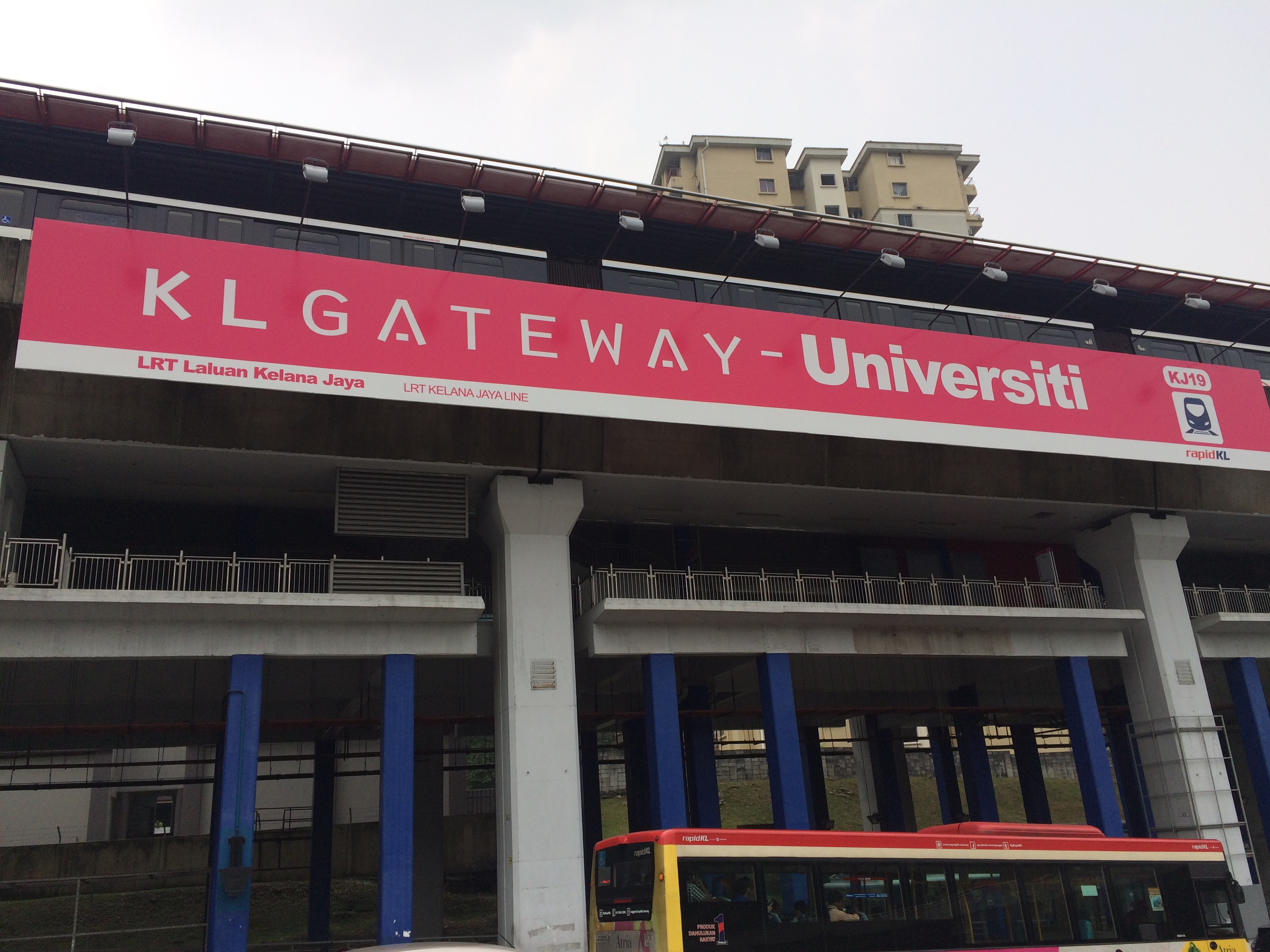
View of the exterior of the station from the Federal Highway with its former name. (2015)

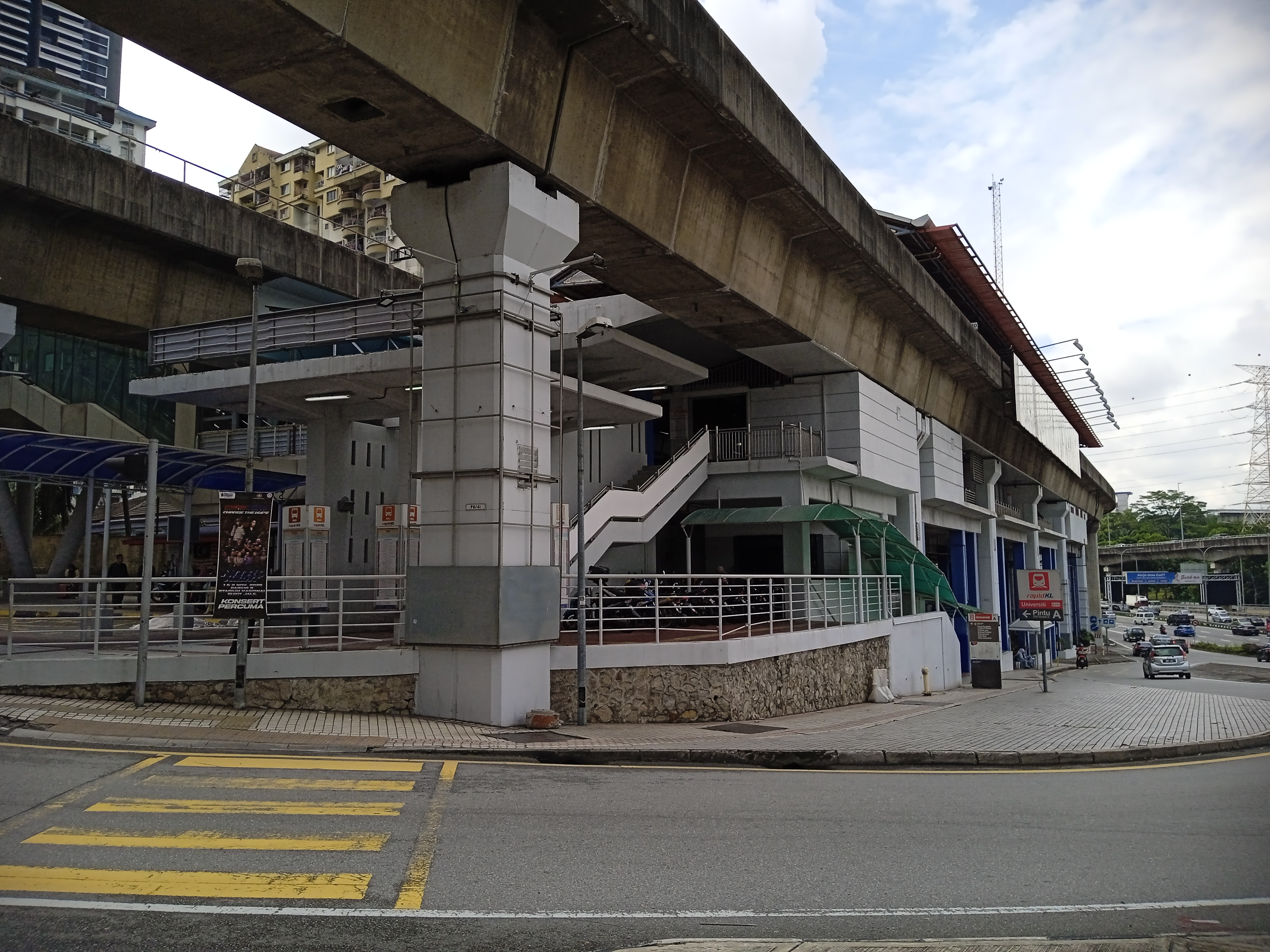
Exterior view of the station from Federal Highway.

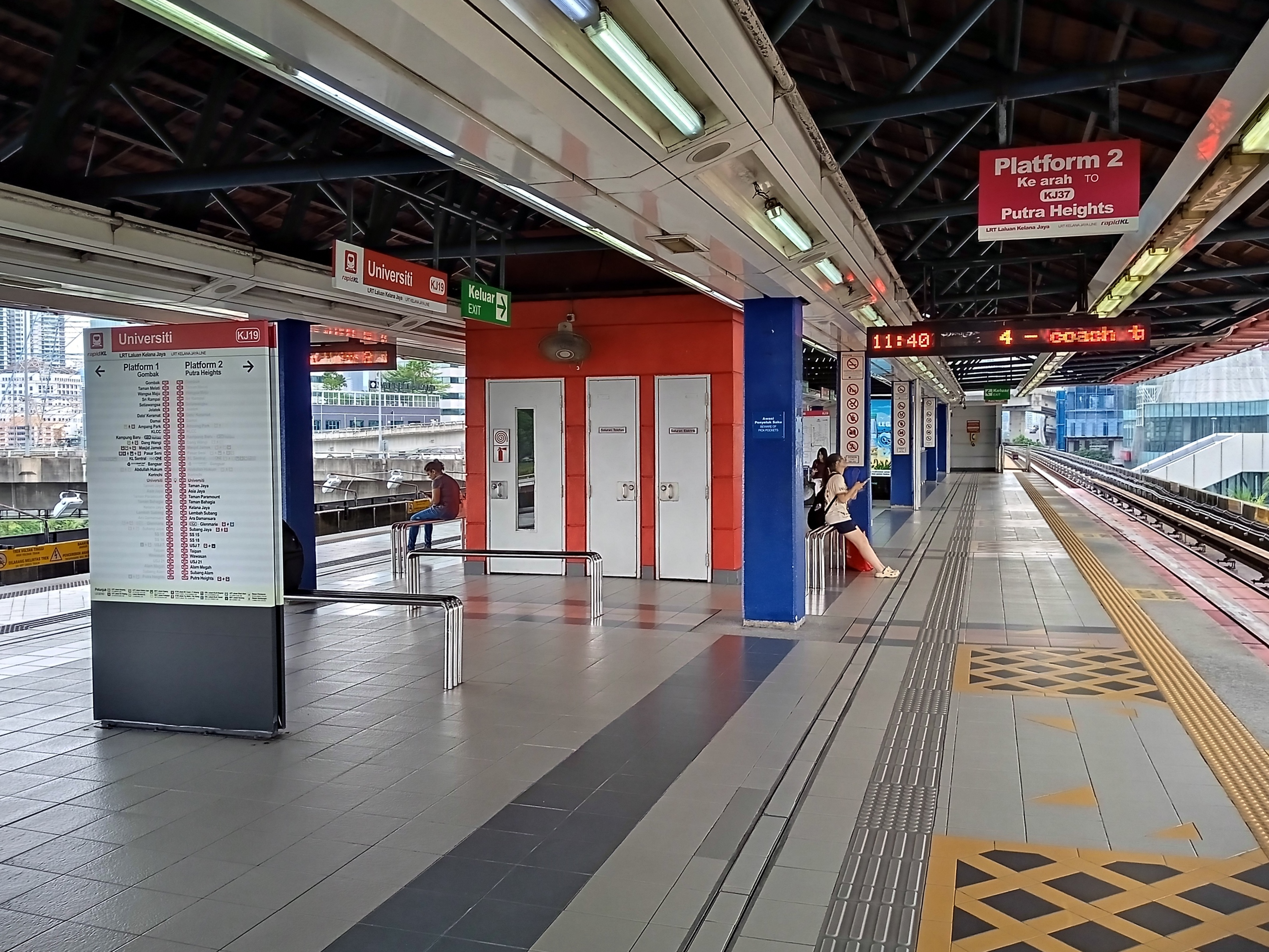
Platform at the station.

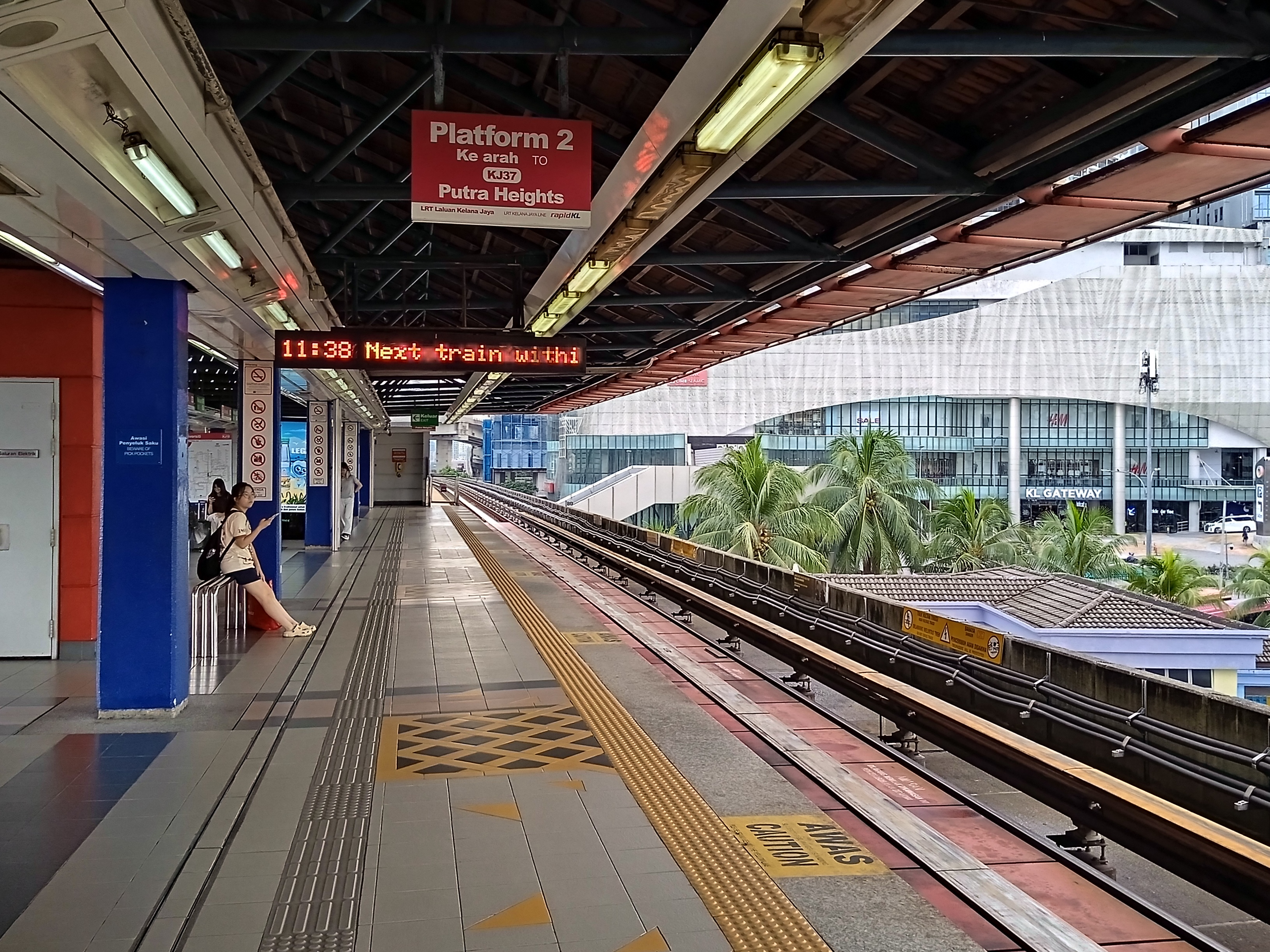
Platform 2 bounds to Putra Heights LRT station at the station.
