= Kerinchi LRT station =

Rail station in Kuala Lumpur, Malaysia

Coordinates: 3°06′55″N 101°40′05″E

KJ18 Kerinchi
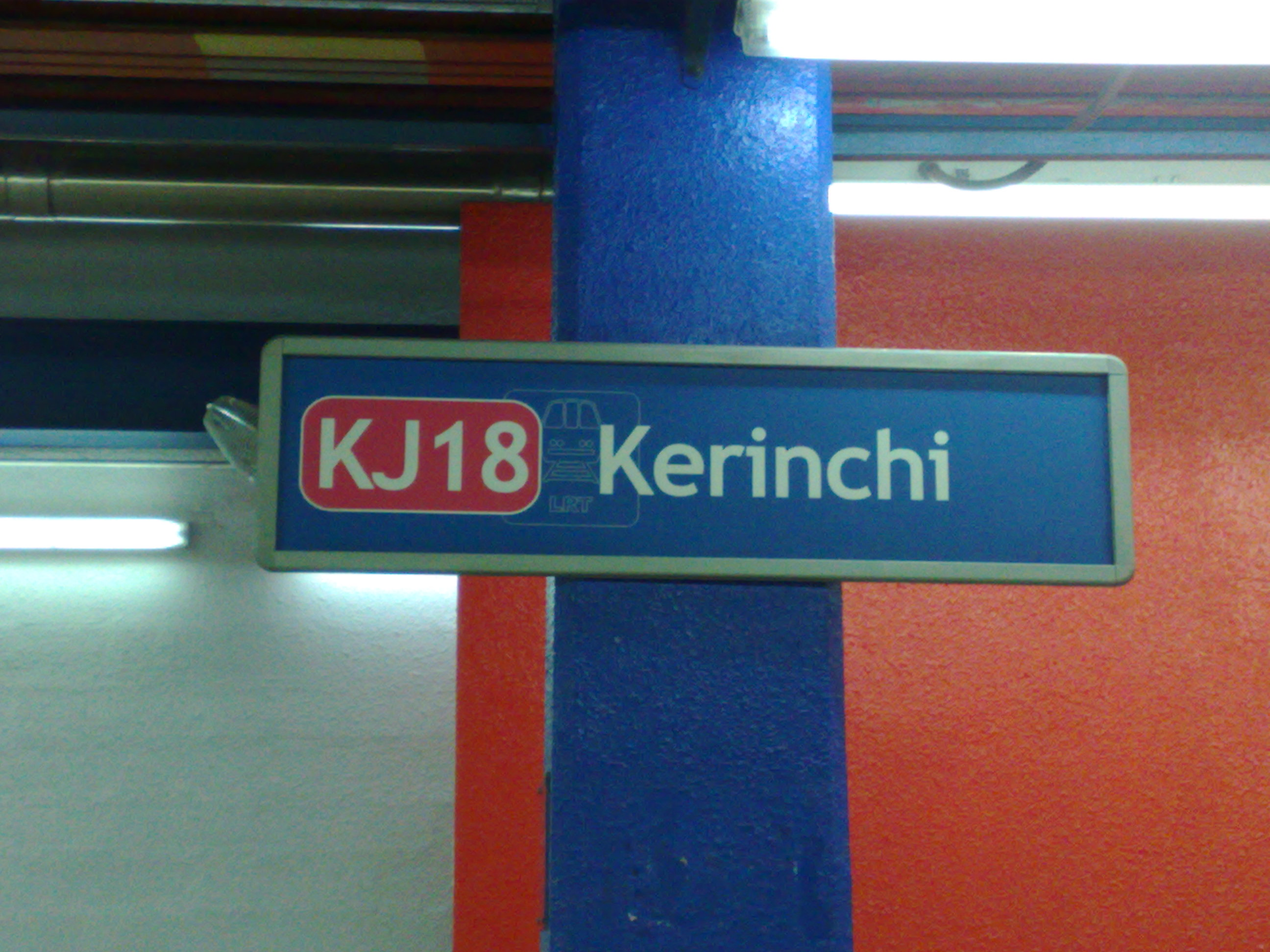
- Platform signage of the station

General information
- Other names: Malay: كرينچي (Jawi); Chinese: 格灵芝; Tamil: கெரிஞ்சி
- Location: Bangsar Trade Centre, Jalan Pantai Baru, 59100 Kuala Lumpur; Malaysia
- System: Rapid KL
- Owner: Prasarana Malaysia
- Operator: Rapid Rail
- Line: 5 Kelana Jaya Line
- Platforms: 2 side platforms
- Tracks: 2

Construction
- Structure type: Elevated
- Parking: Not available
- Cycle facilities: Not available
- Accessible: Available

Other information
- Status: Operational
- Station code: KJ18

History
- Opened: 1 September 1998; 28 years ago

Services
Preceding station		Following station
Abdullah Hukum towards Gombak	Kelana Jaya Line	Universiti towards Putra Heights
Location

The Kerinchi LRT station is a light rapid transit (LRT) elevated station in Kampung Kerinchi, Kuala Lumpur, served by the LRT Kelana Jaya Line. The station, which is named after Kampung Kerinchi, a village within walking distance, is located inside the Bangsar Trade Centre, a mixed commercial complex near Jalan Pantai Baru.

The station is linked to Bangsar South Trade Centre and Bangsar South area by an 800m long pedestrian bridge spanning across the Federal Highway.

== Around the station ==
- Kerinchi Pylon
- Telekom Tower

== Bus services ==
Route no.	Origin	Destination
750	KJ14 KG16 Pasar Seni Hub	UiTM Shah Alam
751	KJ14 KG16 Pasar Seni Hub	Taman Sri Muda, Shah Alam
772	KJ14 KG16 Pasar Seni Hub	Subang Suria Mahsing
780	KJ14 KG16 Pasar Seni Hub	Kota Damansara
