= Desa Petaling =

Township in Kuala Lumpur, Malaysia

Coordinates: 3°05′00.2″N 101°42′37.6″E

Desa Petaling streets

Desa Petaling, also known as Taman Desa Petaling is a township in southern Kuala Lumpur, Malaysia, in the electoral district of Bandar Tun Razak. This township is next to Bandar Tasik Selatan and is also adjacent to Kuchai Lama, Kampung Malaysia and Sri Petaling.

== Education ==
- Sekolah Kebangsaan Desa Petaling
- Sekolah Menengah Kebangsaan Desa Petaling
- Al-Madinah International University

== Transport ==
=== Expressways/Highways/Roads ===
Desa Petaling is accessible through these main expressways and roads.

- East–West Link Expressway Kuala Lumpur–Seremban Expressway
- Shah Alam Expressway Shah Alam Expressway (KESAS)
- New Pantai Expressway New Pantai Expressway (NPE)
- FT 28 Kuala Lumpur Middle Ring Road 2 (MRR2)
- Maju Expressway Maju Expressway
