= Happy Garden =

Coordinates: 3.084682°N 101.684641°E

Happy Garden (Malay: Taman Gembira) is a township near Kuchai Lama, Kuala Lumpur, Malaysia. Nearby housing areas include Taman United and Taman OUG.

Happy Garden is near Jalan Klang Lama, the Sungai Besi Expressway, the Kuala Lumpur–Seremban Expressway, New Pantai Expressway (NPE) and the KL–Putrajaya Expressway (Maju Expressway). Public transportation is also available. There are also food courts and restaurants within the neighborhood, and the township has a night market on every Monday. There is a wet market every day from 6am to 10 am where many groceries can be bought.

== History ==
Happy Garden was founded in 1963. A big portion of the area, some 162 hectares, was developed by Sim Nam Housing Development Co Sdn Bhd.

Happy Garden sits on former rubber estates. Unlike other estates like Petaling Jaya, which were single titled and more organised, the area was fragmented in numerous 0.81-hectare (two-acre) lots, which suited the company's development strategy.

New developments were made in the vicinity to give improved accessibility to the township. Taman Gembira can be reached via several routes, including the Kuala Lumpur–Seremban Expressway, the Shah Alam Expressway, the Puchong–Sungai Besi Highway and the Federal Highway.
