= Kuchai MRT station =

Metro station in Kuala Lumpur, Malaysia

PY27 CC28 Kuchai

General information
- Other names: Malay: کوچاي (Jawi); Chinese: 古仔; Tamil: கூச்சாய்
- Location: Off Jalan Kuchai Lama, Kuchai Lama; 58100 Kuala Lumpur; Malaysia
- Coordinates: 3.0895°N 101.6942°E
- System: Rapid KL
- Owner: MRT Corp
- Operator: Rapid Rail
- Lines: 12 Putrajaya Line; 13 Circle Line (future)
- Platforms: 1 island platform
- Tracks: 2

Construction
- Parking: Available
- Cycle facilities: Available
- Accessible: Yes

Other information
- Status: Operational
- Station code: PY27 CC28

History
- Opened: 16 March 2023; 3 years ago (Putrajaya Line)
- Opening: 2032; 6 years' time (Circle Line)

Services
| Preceding station | | Following station |
|---|---|---|
| Chan Sow Lin towards Kwasa Damansara | Putrajaya Line | Taman Naga Emas towards Putrajaya Sentral |
| Bandar Malaysia Selatan towards Kwasa Damansara | Putrajaya Line Future service | Taman Naga Emas towards Putrajaya Sentral |
| Jalan Klang Lama Clockwise / outer | Circle Line Future service | Salak Jaya Anticlockwise / inner |
Location

The Kuchai MRT station is a mass rapid transit (MRT) station in the suburb of Kuchai Lama in southwestern Kuala Lumpur, Malaysia. It is one of the stations on the MRT Putrajaya Line.

The station was opened to the public on 16 March 2023.

The station is planned as a future interchange with the upcoming MRT Circle Line of the KVMRT project.

== Station details ==
=== Location ===
The station is located on, and named after Jalan Kuchai Lama, which runs from Old Klang Road and Taman OUG, and is near the Exit 907 of the Sungai Besi Expressway.

=== Exits and entrances ===
The station has only 1 entrance for the time being.

Putrajaya Line station
| Entrance | Location | Destination | Picture |
| A | Off Jalan Kuchai Lama | Park and Ride, Residensi Far East, UPA Press Sdn Bhd, Ajinomoto Malaysia Berhad, Kuchai Entrepreneurs Park, Kuchai Lama | |
| B Deferred | Interchange with MRT Circle Line | Proposed connection with the MRT Circle Line in the future | - |

== Bus service ==
=== Feeder bus ===
| Route number | Origin | Destination | Via | Image |
|---|---|---|---|---|
| T585 | KL1218 PY27 Kuchai (Gate A) | Taman Desa | Jalan Kuchai Lama; Jalan Klang Lama; Jalan Desa; Jalan 1/109F; Jalan 3/109F; Jalan 109F; Jalan Desa Bakti; Jalan Desa Utama | |
| T586 | KL1218 PY27 Kuchai (Gate A) | Taman OUG | Jalan Kuchai Lama; Jalan Kuchai Maju; Jalan Gembira; Jalan Awan Besar; Jalan Hujan Emas 4; Jalan Hujan Emas; Jalan 1/149L; Jalan Mesra Ria; Jalan Senang Ria | |
| T587 | KL1218 PY27 Kuchai (Gate A) | Desa Petaling / Salak Selatan | Jalan Kuchai Lama; Sungai Besi Expressway; Jalan Besi Kawi; Jalan 11/108C; Jalan 1/108C; Jalan 1; Jalan 9; Jalan 13; Jalan 11; Jalan 4/125; Jalan 2/125 | |
| T588 | KL1218 PY27 Kuchai (Gate A) | Jalan Klang Lama | Jalan Kuchai Lama; Jalan Klang Lama; Jalan Gembira; Jalan Riang 11; Jalan Rukun 7; Jalan Rukun 6; Jalan Rukun 4; Jalan Rukun 5; Jalan Rukun | |
