= Jalan Kuchai Lama =

Road in Malaysia

Major junctions
- West end: Taman Goodwood
- FT 2 Jalan Klang Lama; Sungai Besi Expressway
- East end: Kuchai interchange Sungai Besi Expressway

Location
- Country: Malaysia
- Primary destinations: Kuchai Lama, Salak South, Sungai Besi

Highway system
- Highways in Malaysia; Expressways; Federal; State

Jalan Kuchai Lama is a major road in Kuala Lumpur, Malaysia. This road is maintained by the Kuala Lumpur City Hall or Dewan Bandaraya Kuala Lumpur (DBKL).

== Upgrading of junctions ==
Construction began in August 2004 and was completed in January 2008. The new interchanges were opened to traffic on 28 February 2008.

In the 2010s, IJM Corporation built dedicated ramps, both linking between New Pantai and Sungai Besi Expressways.

== Junction lists ==
The entire route is located in Kuala Lumpur.

Legend:

- I/C - Interchange, I/S - Intersection, RSA - Rest and service area, OBR - Overhead bridge restaurant, R/R - Restaurant and rest plaza, L/B - Layby, V/P - Vista point, TN - tunnel, T/P - Toll plaza, BR - Bridge
- C - Cloverleaf, S - Stack, T-A - Trumpet-A, T-B - Trumpet-B, DT - Directional-T/Y, SDT - Semi-Directional-T/Y, P-Y - Partial-Y, D - Diamond, P-C - Partial cloverleaf, D-D - Diverging diamond, D-R - Direct ramp

Location	km	mi	Name	Destinations	Notes
Kuchai			Taman Goodwood I/S	FT 2 Jalan Klang Lama – Kuala Lumpur city centre, Seputeh, Cheras, Puchong, Petaling Jaya, Bandar Sunway, Subang Jaya, Shah Alam	T-junctions
Kuchai			Taman Goodwood		
Kuchai			Taman Lian Hoe		
Kuchai			Taman Continental		
Kuchai			Taman Pagar Ruyong		
Kuchai			Taman Kuchai Jaya		
Kuchai			Mega Star Arena	Mega Star Arena	
Kuchai			KFC drive thru		
Kuchai			ILP KL	Institut Latihan Perndustrian Kuala Lumpur (ILP KL)	
Kuchai			Kuchai MRT station	Kuchai MRT station 12	
Kuchai			Kuchai Lama I/C	New Pantai Expressway – Bangsar, Bandar Sunway, Subang Jaya; Kuala Lumpur–Seremban Expressway – Kuala Lumpur, Cheras, KL Sports City, Seremban, Malacca, Johor Bahru; Maju Expressway – Putrajaya, Cyberjaya, Kuala Lumpur International Airport (KLIA); Jalan Kuchai Maju – Kuchai Entrepreneurs Park	Diamond interchange
Kuchai			Kuchai-Sungai Besi I/C	Sungai Besi Expressway – Kuantan, Ampang, Pandan Indah, Shamelin, Kuala Lumpur, Salak South, Sungai Besi, Seri Kembangan, Balakong, Kajang, Mines Resort City	Interchange
1.000 mi = 1.609 km; 1.000 km = 0.621 mi
