= Jalan Puchong–Petaling Jaya =

Road in Malaysia

Selangor Route 11
- Jalan Puchong–Petaling Jaya
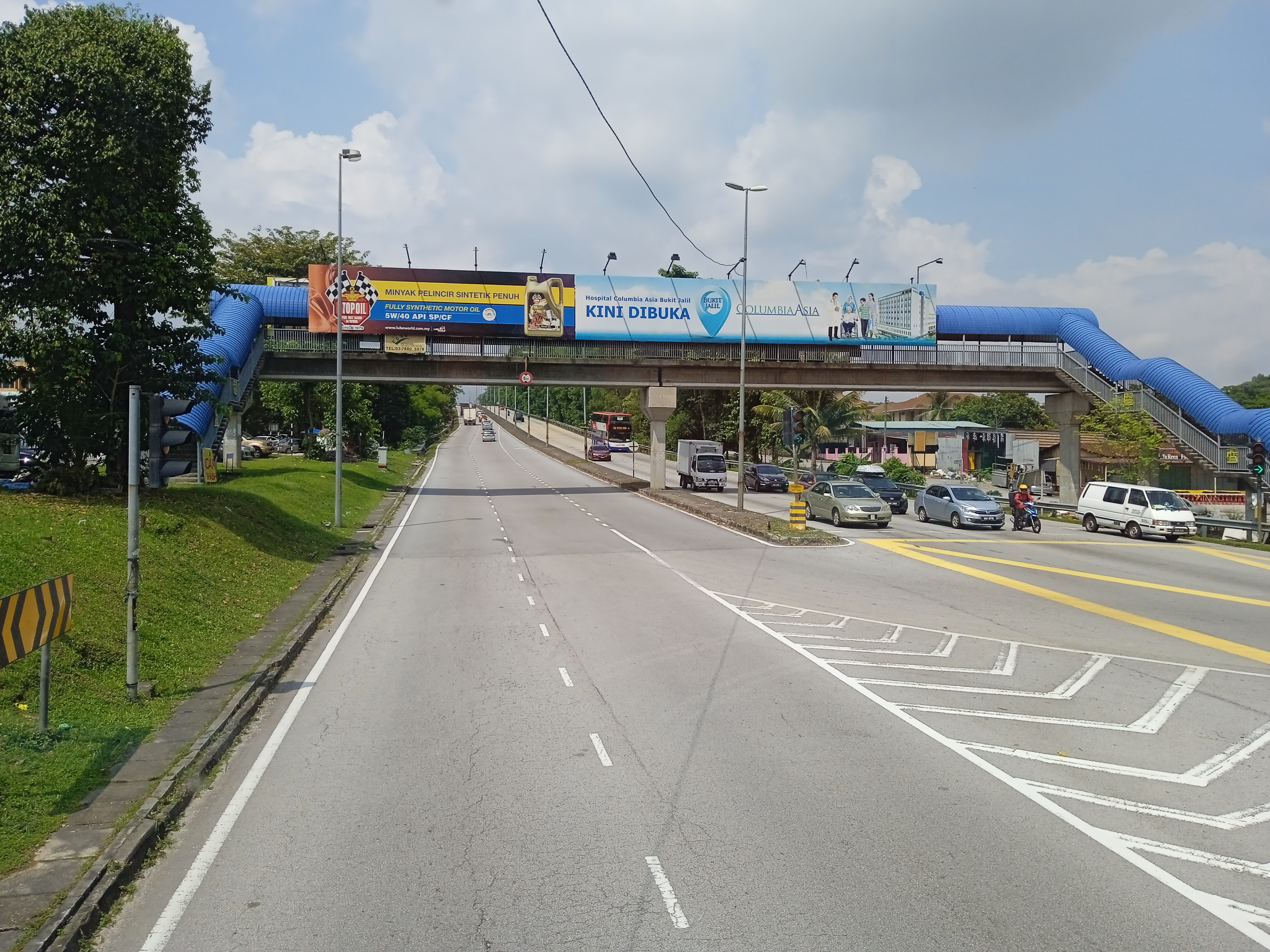

Major junctions
- North end: Jalan Klang Lama
- FT 2 Jalan Klang Lama; Shah Alam Expressway; Damansara–Puchong Expressway; FT 217 Puchong–Sungai Besi Highway
- South end: Puchong Jaya

Location
- Country: Malaysia
- Primary destinations: Petaling Jaya, Bandar Kinrara, Puchong

Highway system
- Highways in Malaysia; Expressways; Federal; State

Jalan Puchong–Petaling Jaya, Selangor State Route B11 is a major road in Klang Valley regions, Selangor, Malaysia.

== Junction list ==
Legend:

- I/C - Interchange, I/S - Intersection, RSA - Rest and service area, OBR - Overhead bridge restaurant, R/R - Restaurant and rest plaza, L/B - Layby, V/P - Vista point, TN - tunnel, T/P - Toll plaza, BR - Bridge
- C - Cloverleaf, S - Stack, T-A - Trumpet-A, T-B - Trumpet-B, DT - Directional-T/Y, SDT - Semi-Directional-T/Y, P-Y - Partial-Y, D - Diamond, P-C - Partial cloverleaf, D-D - Diverging diamond, D-R - Direct ramp

State/territory	District	Location	km	mi	Name	Destinations	Notes
Kuala Lumpur	Seputeh	Petaling			Jalan Klang Lama	FT 2 Jalan Klang Lama – Petaling Jaya; New Pantai Expressway – Bandar Sunway, Subang Jaya, Shah Alam, Kuala Lumpur, Jalan Kuchai Lama, Cheras, Seremban	
Kuala Lumpur	Seputeh	Petaling			Abdul Rahman Auf Mosque		
Kuala Lumpur	Seputeh	Petaling			TNB Kuala Lumpur (South) Intake		
Kuala Lumpur	Seputeh	Kinrara			Taman Lucky		
Kuala Lumpur	Seputeh	Kinrara			Taman Kinrara		
Selangor	Petaling	Kinrara			TUDM Kinrara Camp		
Selangor	Petaling	Kinrara			Jalan Kinrara-SAE	Shah Alam Expressway – Klang, Shah Alam, KL Sports City, Sri Petaling, Kuala Lumpur	
Selangor	Petaling	Puchong Jaya			Puchong Jaya		
Selangor	Petaling	Puchong Jaya			Puchong Jaya-LDP	Damansara–Puchong Expressway – Kepong, Damansara, Kelana Jaya, Bandar Sunway, Klang, Shah Alam, Puchong, Putrajaya, Cyberjaya, Kuala Lumpur International Airport (KLIA); FT 217 Puchong–Sungai Besi Highway – Bandar Kinrara, Bukit Jalil, KL Sports City, Sungai Besi, Kajang, Seremban	Multi-level stacked interchange
1.000 mi = 1.609 km; 1.000 km = 0.621 mi: Concurrency terminus
