= Sri Petaling =

Suburb of Kuala Lumpur, Malaysia

- Suburb in Kuala Lumpur
- Bandar Baru Sri Petaling

- Flag
- Location in Malaysia
- Location within Malaysia
- Coordinates: 3.069135°N 101.6903216°E
- Country: Malaysia
- State: Kuala Lumpur
- Establishment: 1981

Government
  - Mayor of Kuala Lumpur: Nor Hisham Ahmad Dahlan
- Time zone: UTC+8 (MST)
  - Summer (DST): Not observed

The Sri Petaling LRT station (Sri Petaling Line), Sri Petaling, Malaysia.

Sri Petaling (also known as Bandar Baru Sri Petaling) is a suburb of Kuala Lumpur, in Malaysia. The 620 acres (250 hectares) township is located in the south of the city, within the constituency of Seputeh, and is bordered by the towns of Happy Garden, Taman OUG, Kuchai Lama and Bukit Jalil.

== Distance ==
Sri Petaling has access to the Government departments in Putrajaya, to Cyberjaya and to the Kuala Lumpur International Airport. Sepang International Circuit is twenty-five minutes away, Kuala Lumpur city centre, Petaling Jaya, Subang Jaya, Damansara and Puchong are 15 minutes away, Shah Alam is 20 minutes away, and the royal town of Klang is 45 minutes away.

== History ==
Bandar Baru Sri Petaling was launched in 1977 and developed in 1981 by property development company Petaling Garden Berhad.

From the mid-1980s to the mid-1990s it was widely known as the 'rubbish area' as it was the location of a landfill site. Garbage disposal was discontinued and the land it had occupied turned into a playground and car park area for the 1998 Commonwealth Games.

The three areas of Sri Petaling that were first developed for residential use were the areas of Jalan Puteri Senggang near the main road, Jalan Wan Empok 1 and Jalan Wan Empok 2. These were the main residential areas of Sri Petaling in the 1980s and the houses were sold for between RM40,000 and RM60,000.

The population in Sri Petaling was not high in the early 1980s as it was relatively distant from the city of Kuala Lumpur and a little isolated. The population grew in the late 1980s. Over the course of the next decade, development continued and the population grew. In 1997, the Shah Alam Expressway (KESAS) was opened. In 2007, the Maju Expressway (MEX) opened. The expressway connects residents to the city centre, Putrajaya, Cyberjaya, and the Kuala Lumpur International Airport.

In 2020, Sri Petaling has been associated with being Southeast Asia's COVID-19 hotspot during the COVID-19 global pandemic. The virus was spread at a tabligh event held at the Sri Petaling mosque. There were 16,000 attendees, including 1,500 foreigners. Multiple Covid-19 cases related to this event popped up across Southeast Asia. It is uncertain who the virus originated from at the event. Majority of Malaysian COVID-19 cases during the pandemic are linked to this event.

== Transport ==
The township is located 15 km south of Kuala Lumpur city centre and is accessible from highways such as the Kuala Lumpur–Seremban Expressway, Shah Alam Expressway (KESAS), New Pantai Expressway (NPE), Middle Ring Road 2 (MRR2) and the Maju Expressway (MEX). Sri Petaling is served by two light rapid transit (LRT) stations, Bukit Jalil and Sri Petaling, on the Sri Petaling Line and the Taman Naga Emas MRT station on the northeastern side on the MRT Putrajaya Line.

== Retail ==
By 1998, Sri Petaling had its own Carrefour hypermarket located in the Endah Parade Shopping Complex. Although Carrefour declared its intention to move from Sri Petaling in 2010, the hypermarket was bought over by the AEON Co. Ltd. in 2012 for RM990 million.

On early 2013 the first phase of new shops (Zone J) were completed by I&P Group the sole developer of the area along Jalan Radin Bagus. As of March 2014, the final phase of shops surrounding The Store Hypermarket was completed.

== Education ==
Sri Petaling has kindergartens, primary schools and two secondary schools.
