= Abdul Rahman Auf Mosque =

Mosque in Kuala Lumpur, Malaysia

- Masjid Abdul Rahman Auf
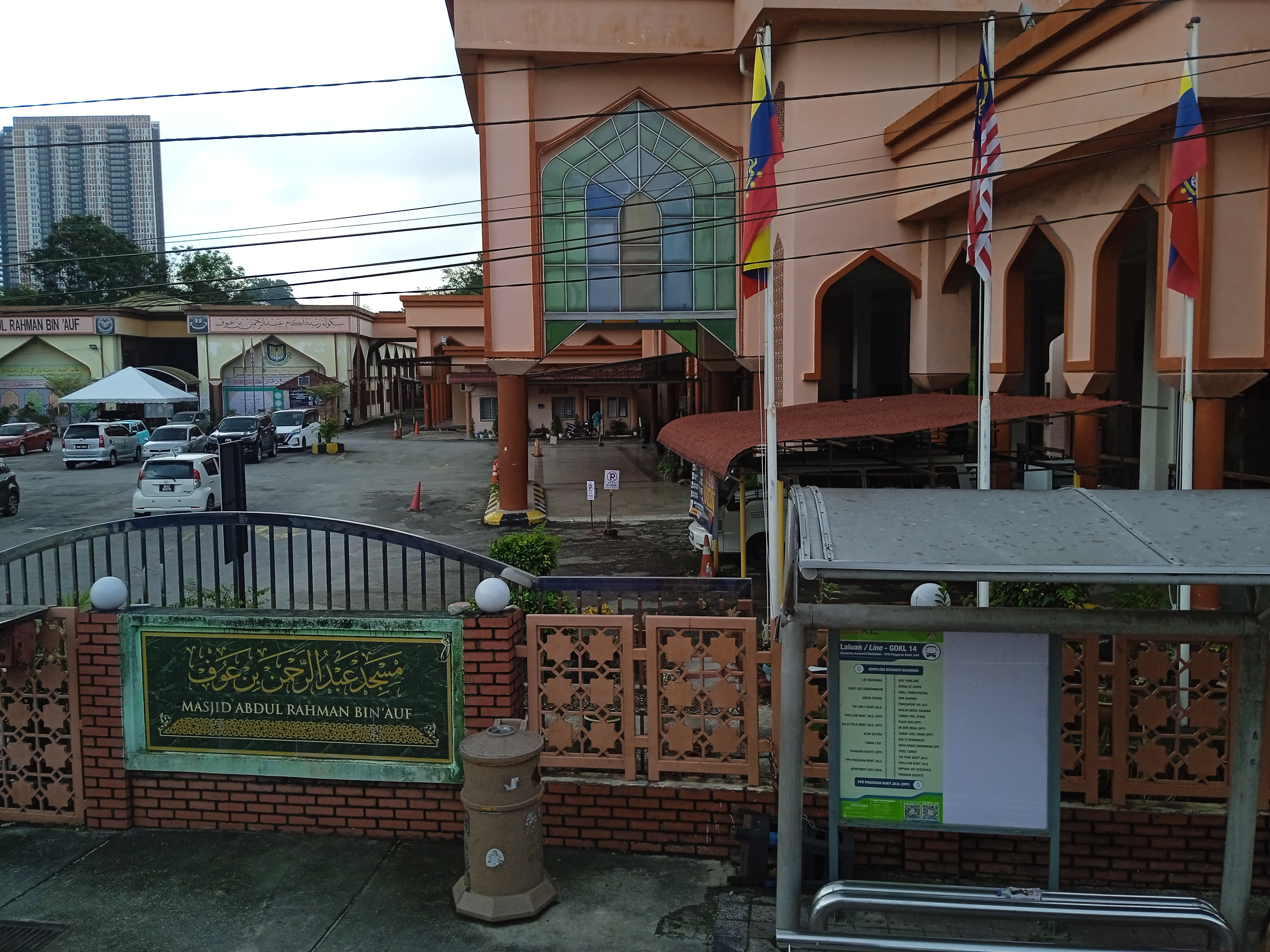

- Location within Kuala Lumpur

Religion
- Affiliation: Sunni Islam

Location
- Location: Kuala Lumpur, Malaysia
- Interactive map of Abdul Rahman Auf Mosque
- Coordinates: 3.079367°N 101.665570°E

Architecture
- Type: Mosque
- Minaret height: 1

Abdul Rahman Auf Mosque (Malay: Masjid Abdul Rahman Auf) is a mosque in Kuala Lumpur, Malaysia. This mosque is located at Jalan Puchong near Jalan Klang Lama junctions.

== See also ==
- Islam in Malaysia
