= Murders of Intan Yusniza Mohamad Yunos and Haniza Ismail =

1991 double murder of a child celebrity and her foster mother in Malaysia

Intan Yusniza Mohamad Yunos
- Intan Yusniza, who was killed alongside her mother
- Born: Intan Yusniza Mohamad Yunos; 1979; Malaysia
- Died: 22 June 1991 (aged 12); Kampung Seri Budiman, Jalan Kuchai Lama, Kuala Lumpur, Malaysia
- Cause of death: Fatal head injuries
- Other name: Intan Yusniza Mohd Yunus
- Education: Sekolah Kebangsaan Salak Selatan
- Occupation: Television host
- Employer: Radio Televisyen Malaysia
- Known for: Her career and murder
- Parent(s): "Mohamad Yunos" (foster father); Haniza Ismail (foster mother)

Haniza Ismail
- Haniza Ismail, Intan's foster mother who was also killed
- Born: Haniza Ismail; 1935; Malaysia
- Died: 22 June 1991 (aged 56); Kampung Seri Budiman, Jalan Kuchai Lama, Kuala Lumpur, Malaysia
- Cause of death: Fatal head injuries
- Occupation: Stall owner
- Employer: Herself
- Known for: Her murder
- Spouse: "Mohamad Yunos" (died 1988)
- Children: Intan Yusniza Mohamad Yunos (adopted daughter)

On 22 June 1991, at Kuala Lumpur, the capital city of Malaysia, 12-year-old children television host Intan Yusniza Mohamad Yunos and her 56-year-old foster mother Haniza Ismail were both found robbed and murdered at their terrace house in Kampung Seri Budiman, Jalan Kuchai Lama. Post-mortem reports showed that Intan and her mother were being bludgeoned to death by a blunt instrument. The police arrested a jobless man for the murders, and the 24-year-old suspect, Zainuzzaman Mohamad Jasadi, was charged with the double murder. In August 1992, a seven-member jury at the Kuala Lumpur High Court acquitted Zainuzzaman of killing Haniza without calling for his defence, but the same jury found Zainuzzaman guilty of murdering Intan by a majority decision of six to one. For the charge of murdering Intan, Zainuzzaman was sentenced to death, and he was eventually hanged on 5 October 2001 after losing his appeal.

== Double murder ==
On 22 June 1991, at Kuala Lumpur, the capital city of Malaysia, a 12-year-old child celebrity and her foster mother were found murdered at their terrace house in Kampung Seri Budiman, Jalan Kuchai Lama.

12-year-old Intan Yusniza Mohamad Yunos, who was a popular television host for Angkasapuri Children's Club of Radio Televisyen Malaysia (RMT), was found lying motionless in a pool of blood at the living room with her 56-year-old mother Haniza Ismail. A neighbour of the mother-daughter pair discovered their deaths while he was outside cleaning his car, and the same neighbour also last witnessed the pair being brought back home on a van the night before the murders. Some jewellery and money were also missing from the house, suggesting that the case was a possible robbery-murder.

An autopsy report by Dr. Abdul Rahman Yusof of Kuala Lumpur Hospital ascertained that the head injuries on Intan and Haniza were sufficient in the ordinary course of nature to cause death and were inflicted by a blunt object (five times for Intan and two for Haniza) – Intan died due to a shattered skull while Haniza's death was due to massive brain haemorrhage. Reports suggested that Intan and Haniza were possibly raped by the attacker(s) prior to their deaths.

At the time of her death, Intan, who was then a Primary Six student of Sekolah Kebangsaan Salak Selatan, was the only child of her parents; her father was a former police officer who died of an illness three or four years prior to the double murder. Further reports later showed that Intan was not Haniza's biological child, as she was adopted after her birth. Her biological parents were from an extremely poor family and Intan was thus given up for adoption and raised in Kuala Lumpur by Haniza and her late husband, and Intan never got to meet her birth mother despite knowing the truth of her adoption.

== Murder investigations ==
The Royal Malaysia Police classified the double deaths of Intan and Haniza as murder, and the police appealed for public assistance or witnesses to provide any crucial information to crack the case, and a local Malay-language newspaper offered a reward of RM3,500 for the capture of the culprits. The City Hall in Kuala Lumpur also set up a reward of RM10,000 for information leading to the arrest of the killer(s) responsible for the murders. Residents of Kampung Seri Budiman also gathered up some money to offer a cash reward for information to track down the killers of both Intan and Haniza. The Malaysian public, which became greatly shocked over the double murder, were filled with outrage and called for immediate justice to be served.

On 1 July 1991, the police got a breakthrough and managed to arrest a suspect, and announced to the public four days later that a 24-year-old unemployed neighbour of the victims was caught at Lenggeng, Negeri Sembilan on suspicion of committing the double murder. The suspect was detained for ten days and had his remand order extended before the police completed their investigations, and they confirmed that Zainuzzaman would be charged with two counts of murder on a date to be decided. It was also speculated that the suspect had killed Intan due to an obsessive but unreciprocated crush on her. An iron pipe, believed to be the murder weapon, as well as two gold chains and five bracelets belonging to Haniza were recovered by the police.

On 12 July 1991, the 24-year-old unemployed suspect, a drug addict whose name was Zainuzzaman Mohamad Jasadi, was charged with the two murders of Haniza Ismail and Intan Yusniza Mohamad Yunos at the Kuala Lumpur Magistrate's Court.

== Zainuzzaman's murder trial ==
Zainuzzaman Mohamad Jasadi
- Born: c. 1967; Lenggeng, Negeri Sembilan, Malaysia
- Died: 5 October 2001 (aged 34); Kajang Prison, Sungai Jelok, Kajang, Selangor, Malaysia
- Cause of death: Execution by hanging
- Status: Executed
- Conviction: Murder (one count)
- Penalty: Death

Details
- Victims: 1 confirmed, 1 suspected
- Date: 22 June 1991
- Country: Malaysia
- State: Selangor
- Date apprehended: 1 July 1991

In August 1992, after some preliminary hearings from October 1991 to March 1992, 24-year-old Zainuzzaman Mohamad Jasadi stood trial at the Kuala Lumpur High Court for two counts of murder (one for each of the victims), where his trial was presided over by Justice Mokhtar Sidin and a jury of seven members. Under the previous laws of Malaysia before the 1995 abolition of jury trials, should the jury found him guilty of murder, either by a majority or unanimous decision, Zainuzzaman would be sentenced to the mandatory death penalty under Section 302 of the Malaysian Penal Code.

During the trial itself, the prosecution charged that Zainuzzaman broke into the terrace house of Intan and her foster mother in order to commit burglary, and in furtherance of his intention, he had wielded an iron pipe and attacked both Intan and Haniza, beating the both of them to their deaths while the mother-daughter duo was sleeping in their living room. A chicken slaughterer named R. Mahendran testified that Zainuzzaman had sold him a gold chain engraved with the name "Intan" sometime after the double murder, and it was confirmed that the chain belonged to Intan herself. Mohamed Fazli, a youth who lived near Intan's house, also told the court he saw Zainuzzaman outside the house around the time when the killings happened, and had once picked out Zainuzzaman from the police parade. According to Inspector Khoo Chee Ben, Zainuzzaman readily confessed to the murders after his arrest, and asked for forgiveness.

Despite having confessed to the crime, Zainuzzaman, however, denied in court that he made the confession voluntarily, and stated that he was physically abused by the investigators and therefore admitted to the double murder under duress. The officers, however, stated that the defendant appeared normal when the confession was recorded. After a trial-within-a-trial, although none of Zainuzzaman's claims of being abused was accepted, the confession of Zainuzzaman was ruled inadmissible as evidence and therefore thrown out.

At the close of the prosecution's case, by the jury's majority decision of five to two, Zainuzzaman was found not guilty and therefore acquitted of the murder of Haniza Ismail. However, since a prima facie case was established against the accused for the other charge of killing Intan, Zainuzzaman was ordered to enter his defence. Zainuzzaman continued to deny that he killed Intan when he put up his defence, and he only admitted to breaking and entering to steal the jewellery but claimed he never went into the room where Intan was sleeping, and he also denied that he used an iron pipe to beat up Intan until she died.

The prosecution, led by Idrus Harun, argued before the jury and trial judge that Zainuzzaman's defence, which were made up of bare denials, was ought to be rejected in view of the "strong" circumstantial evidence against him, which demonstrated his guilt of the crime. They pointed out that R Mahendran had positively identified the gold chain sold to him by the accused, and it belonged to Intan. His admission to steal the other valuables was a telling sign of his guilt and intention to kill Intan after committing burglary, and the areas where the injuries were inflicted, mostly the vital parts of Intan's body, showed that Zainuzzaman had the intention to cause the death of Intan. The verdict was scheduled to be delivered on 17 August 1992.

After the completion of submissions, Justice Mokhtar summed up the main points of the evidence to the jury, directing them to consider the prerequisite intention of murder, where Intan herself sustained at least two blows to the head, which resulted in injuries sufficient in the ordinary course of nature to cause death, and to remind the jury that the murder weapon was at most, possibly the pipe shown by Zainuzzaman and it was not definite whether he had used it to bludgeon Intan to death.

On 17 August 1992, the date when the judge completed summing up the case and evidence, the seven-member jury, after nearly three hours of deliberation, returned with their verdict on the same day. By a majority decision of six to one, the jury found 25-year-old Zainuzzaman Mohamad Jasadi guilty of the murder of 12-year-old Intan Yusniza Mohamad Yunos, and recommended the mandatory death sentence. Justice Mokhtar Sidin, who agreed with the jury's findings, concurred with the jury and therefore convicted Zainuzzaman of Intan's murder, and sentenced him to death by hanging.

== Execution ==
After he was sentenced to hang, Zainuzzaman filed an appeal against his conviction, but the Court of Appeal rejected his appeal. Afterwards, Zainuzzaman further appealed to the Federal Court of Malaysia, the apex court of the country, once again seeking to overturn his conviction and sentence for murdering Intan, but on 30 September 1997, five years after the end of his trial, the Federal Court upheld the death sentence and murder conviction of Zainuzzaman, and rejected his final appeal.

Upon receiving news of the Federal Court's ruling, Amnesty International, a human rights group, publicly appealed to the Malaysian government to spare the lives of both Zainuzzaman and a drug trafficker Wong Chee Long (or Wong Chee Leong) from the gallows; Wong's final fate is unknown till today. As a final recourse to escape the gallows, Zainuzzaman appealed to the Yang di-Pertuan Agong, the royal ruler of Malaysia, for a royal pardon, which may commute his death sentence to life imprisonment if successful. However, his petition was dismissed, leading to Zainuzzaman losing his final bid to avoid the death penalty.

On 5 October 2001, about ten years and three months after the double murder, 34-year-old Zainuzzaman Mohamad Jasadi was hanged in Kajang Prison.

== Aftermath ==
In the aftermath of Zainuzzaman's arrest, 27 policemen who took part in the investigation were commended for their efforts to solve the case in November 1991. Six police officers were awarded in 1992 for their efforts to bring the killer to justice. A task force was also set up to better the rate of investigations of serious crimes.

Shelly Zailani, Intan's friend from the television station, made her debut as a singer in February 1992 and released her debut solo album "Untukmu Intan" (for you, Intan), and one of her songs, which shared the same title as the album name, was recorded in memory of Intan. Shelley stated that she recorded it for three days and she cried during the production, as she and Intan were close with each other and she was sad when the news of Intan's murder came to light. The City Hall also donated a sum of RM10,000 to the next-of-kin of Intan and Haniza.

The murders of Intan and her foster mother was recalled in 2007 due to the brutal nature of the crime. In 2008, Intan was still remembered even after she died for 17 years, and given her popularity, charm and eloquence, Intan was held in high regard and was said to have the potential to become a popular television host if she had not died back in 1991. Those who knew her back then praised her as a lovely girl who got along well with everyone apart from her work performance.

== See also ==
- Capital punishment in Malaysia
