= Kuala Lumpur–Seremban Expressway =

Road in Malaysia

Expressway 37
- Kuala Lumpur–Seremban Expressway; Lebuhraya Kuala Lumpur-Seremban 隆芙大道

Route information
- Maintained by ANIH Berhad (formerly known as MetaCorp Sdn Bhd)
- Length: 8.1 km (5.0 mi)
- Existed: 1974–present
- History: Completed in 1982

Major junctions
- North end: Jalan Istana, Kuala Lumpur
- Kuala Lumpur Middle Ring Road 1 Sungai Besi Expressway; SMART Tunnel; East–West Link Expressway; New Pantai Expressway; Maju Expressway; Shah Alam Expressway; FT 217 Bukit Jalil Highway; North–South Expressway Southern Route
- South end: Sungai Besi Toll Plaza

Location
- Country: Malaysia
- Primary destinations: Kuala Lumpur, Sungai Besi, Taman Desa, Kuchai Lama, Desa Petaling, Sri Petaling, Kompleks Sukan Negara, Seremban, Malacca, Johor Bahru

Highway system
- Highways in Malaysia; Expressways; Federal; State

The Kuala Lumpur–Seremban Expressway (Malay: Lebuhraya Kuala Lumpur–Seremban, Chinese: 隆芙大道) is a main expressway in Kuala Lumpur, Malaysia. This 8.1 km (5.0 mi) expressway links Kuala Lumpur in the north to Seremban, Negeri Sembilan in the south.

Some maps label this highway as E2 as it links directly with the North–South Expressway Southern Route; however this appellation is not strictly correct as this particular stretch of road is not managed by PLUS Malaysia Berhad, but rather by ANIH Berhad (formerly known as Metramac Corporation (MetaCorp)). Consequently, the toll rate at Sungai Besi Toll Plaza had included an extra payment to cover the Kuala Lumpur–Seremban Expressway until 2018, when the toll was abolished.

In 2007, the expressway was assigned its own route number of E37 together with Salak Expressway.

== Route background ==
The Kilometre Zero of the expressway starts at the Razak Mansion Interchange while its southern terminus is right before the Sungai Besi toll plaza at the North–South Expressway Southern Route E2. Its final kilometre (KM8.1) is also the final kilometre of the North–South Expressway E2 (KM310.8).

== History ==
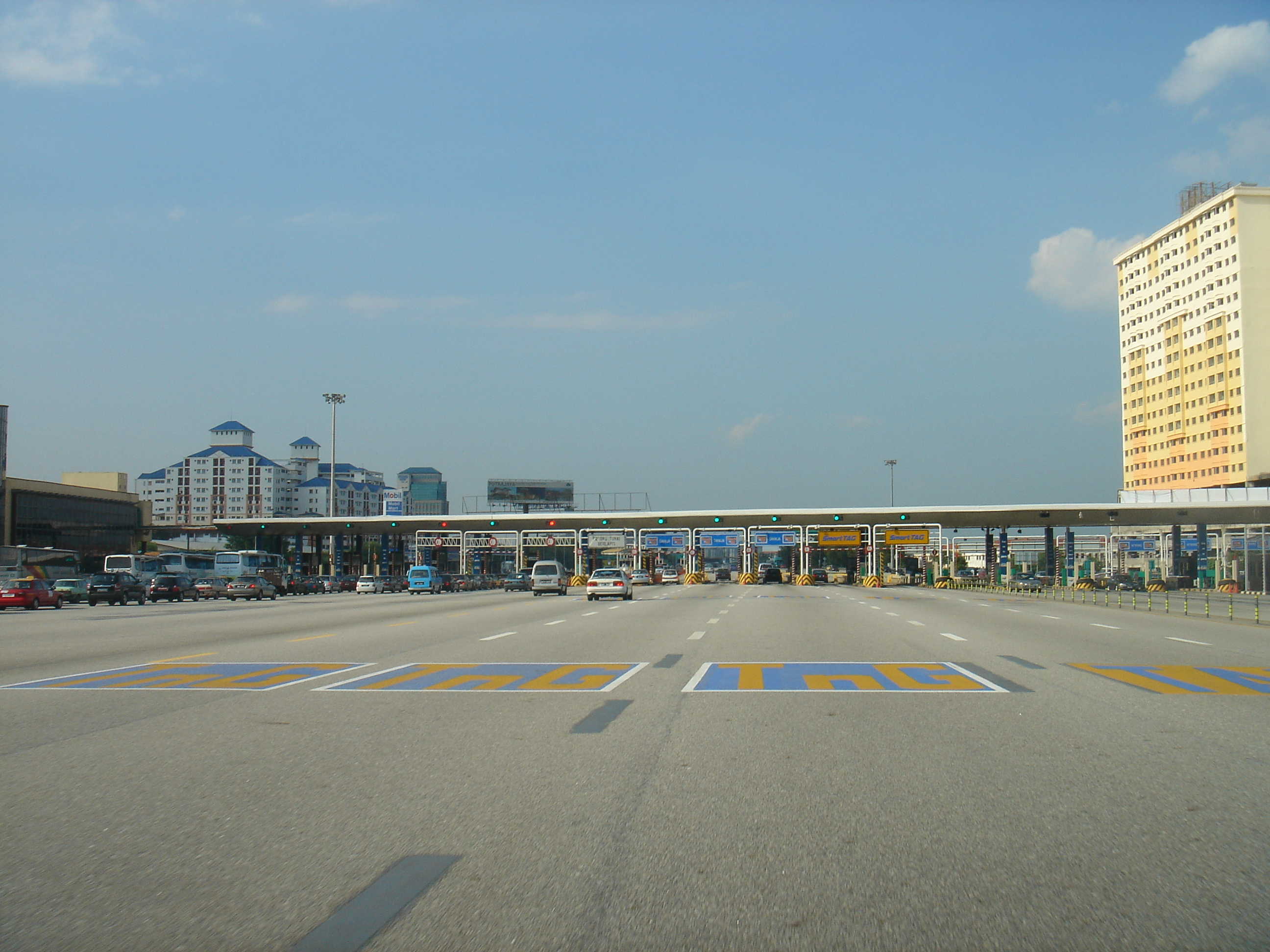
Sungai Besi Toll Plaza is the second largest expressway toll plaza in Malaysia.

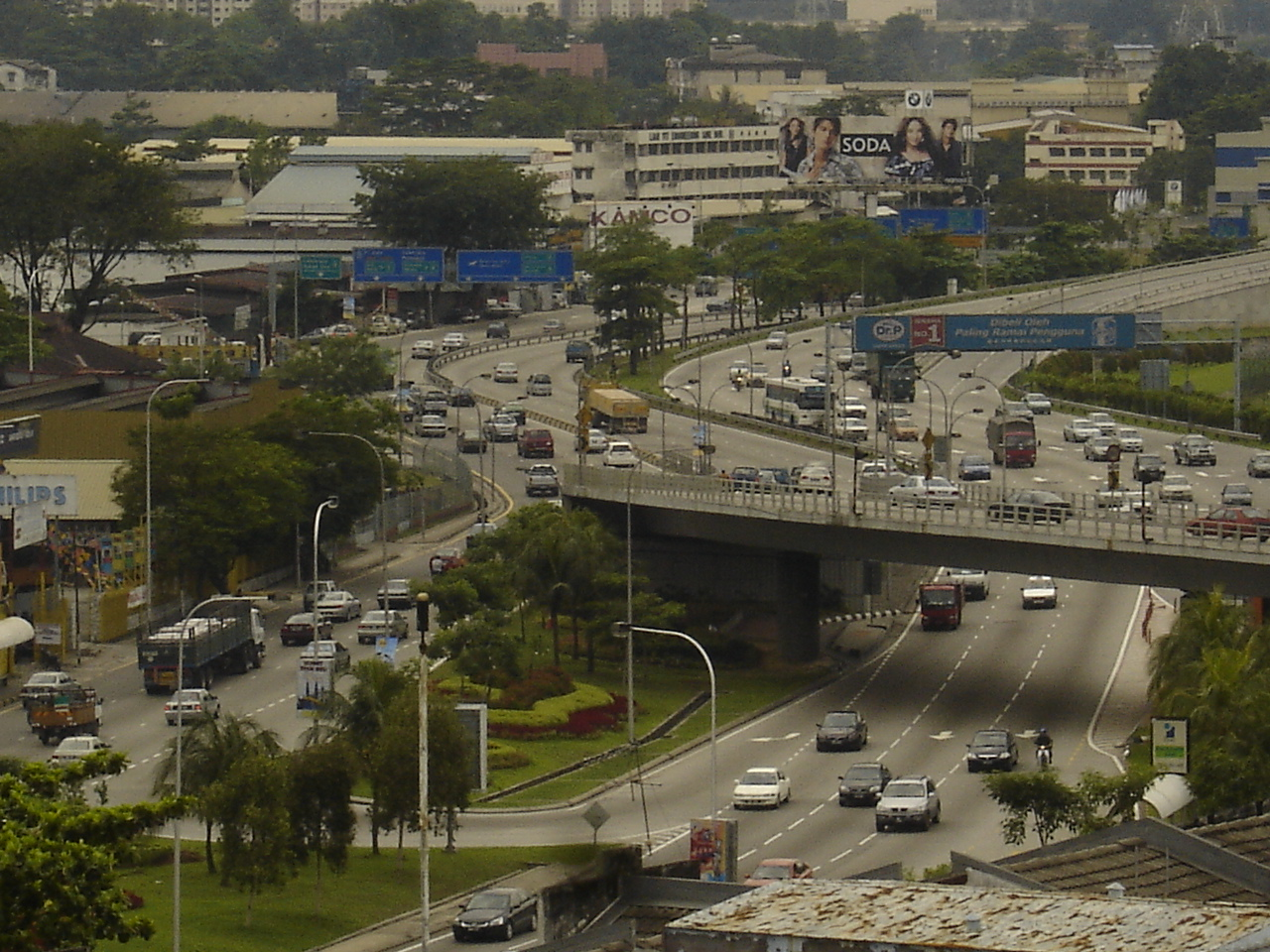
The Jalan Istana junction on the KL–Seremban Expressway in Kuala Lumpur.

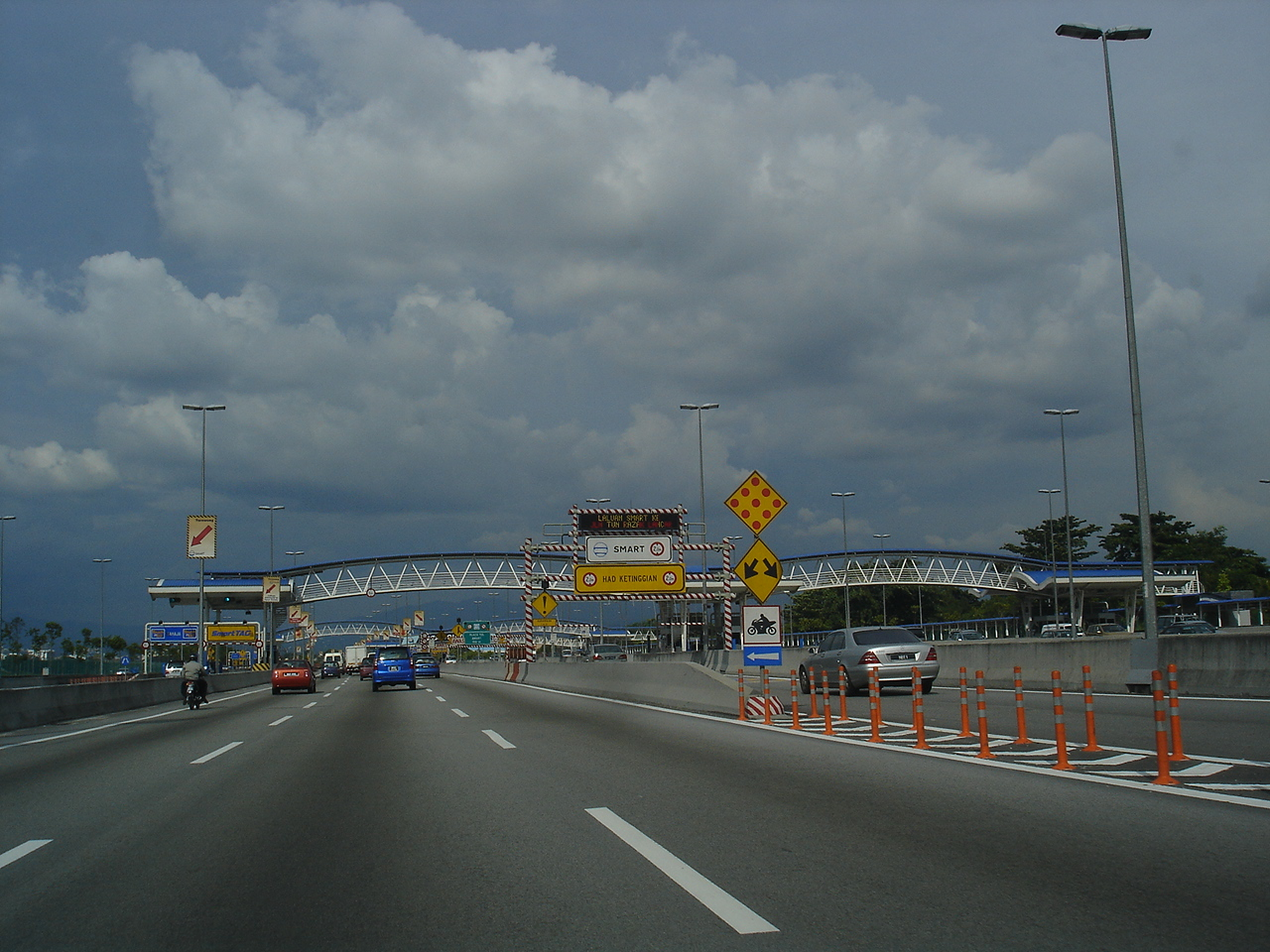
The north bound entrance of SMART Tunnel on the Kuala Lumpur–Seremban Expressway.

The construction of the 63.4 km (39.3 mi) controlled-access expressway from Kuala Lumpur to Seremban began on 27 March 1974 as one of the Second Malaysia Plan (RMK-2) project, with the total cost of RM32.9 million. It consists of 14 interchanges, 2 laybys and 6 toll plaza (Sungai Besi, UPM, Kajang, Bangi, Nilai and Seremban). Funded by a World Bank loan, the expressway was constructed in three phases; the first phase was from Kuala Lumpur to Nilai, while the second phase was from Nilai to Seremban. The third phase was the rehabilitation of the old Federal Route 1 from Kuala Lumpur to Seremban as a toll-free alternative to motorists.

The expressway was opened to motorists on 16 June 1982, along with introduction of toll payment. The Minister of Works at that time, Datuk Seri S. Samy Vellu himself became the first motorist to pay the toll of the expressway. The Kuala Lumpur–Seremban Expressway was the first expressway in Malaysia to implement the closed-toll system.

The RM32.9 million expressway became a pioneer route for the North–South Expressway Southern Route. Initially, the expressway ended at Jalan Seremban–Tampin intersection in Senawang before being extended southwards as part of the North–South Expressway; Exit 220 Senawang Interchange was constructed to divert the expressway through traffic to Ayer Keroh. After the extension of the expressway to Ayer Keroh was completed in 1986, the old Seremban toll plaza at Labu was demolished and was replaced with three toll plazas at Seremban, Port Dickson and Senawang interchanges.

In 1987, the North–South Expressway project was privatised and was taken over by Highway Concessionaires Berhad (now PLUS Expressways Berhad). However, Plus Expressways Berhad only took over the section from Sungai Besi Toll Plaza southwards, leaving the remaining 8.1-km section under the Kuala Lumpur City Hall (DBKL) management until 1992 when the remaining 8.1-km section was upgraded to six lanes by Metramac Corporation Sdn Bhd (MetaCorp), together with the East–West Link Expressway.

On 7 April 2011, MetaCorp changed its name to ANIH Berhad after taking over the operations of toll concession from MTD Prime Sdn Bhd and MetaCorp who respectively owned the concessions for Kuala Lumpur–Karak Expressway, East Coast Expressway Phase 1, and Kuala Lumpur–Seremban Expressway (including East–West Link Expressway) with effect from 6 December 2011.

Today, the name Kuala Lumpur–Seremban Expressway is only applied to the remaining stretch (from Razak Mansion to Sungai Besi toll plaza) managed by ANIH Berhad after PLUS Malaysia Berhad acquired the southern stretch from Sungai Besi toll plaza onwards on 1988 and the Seremban Layby was transformed into a major Rest and Service Area.

== Toll rates ==
The toll collection for the highway at Sungai Besi toll plaza has ceased on June 1, 2018. This is following announcement by the Malaysian Highway Authority, toll concessions for the Kuala Lumpur–Seremban Expressway and Salak Expressway will end.

== Interchange lists ==
Below is a list of interchanges (exits) and laybys along the Kuala Lumpur–Seremban Expressway. The entire expressway is built as a six-lane divided expressway with the speed limit of 80 km/h and is located within the Federal Territory of Kuala Lumpur.

Legend:

- I/C - Interchange, I/S - Intersection, RSA - Rest and service area, OBR - Overhead bridge restaurant, R/R - Restaurant and rest plaza, L/B - Layby, V/P - Vista point, TN - tunnel, T/P - Toll plaza, BR - Bridge
- C - Cloverleaf, S - Stack, T-A - Trumpet-A, T-B - Trumpet-B, DT - Directional-T/Y, SDT - Semi-Directional-T/Y, P-Y - Partial-Y, D - Diamond, P-C - Partial cloverleaf, D-D - Diverging diamond, D-R - Direct ramp

km	Exit	Name	Destinations	Notes
Through to Jalan Sungai Besi
D0.0		Razak Mansion I/C	Sungai Besi Expressway – Salak South, Seri Kembangan, Balakong, Kajang	Interchange
D1.3		SMART Tunnel I/C	SMART Tunnel – Bukit Bintang, Imbi, Jalan Tun Razak, Kuala Lumpur city centre	From / To south only For cars only Maximum clearance: 2.1 m
D1.8		Salak I/C	East–West Link Expressway – Bangsar, Petaling Jaya, Shah Alam, Klang, Cheras, Kajang	
	BR	Sungai Kerayong bridge		
D2.5		Kuchai Lama I/C	New Pantai Expressway – Jalan Kuchai Lama, Bandar Sunway, Bangsar, Subang Jaya; Maju Expressway – Putrajaya, Cyberjaya, Kuala Lumpur International Airport (KLIA)	
D3.3	L/B	Petron L/B		Southbound
D4.0		Desa Petaling I/C	Desa Petaling	No access from southbound
D4.8		Sungai Besi entry ramp	Sungai Besi Expressway – Jalan Kuchai Lama, Salak South	Northbound only
D4.9	L/B	Sri Petaling Furnishing Centre and Shell L/B		Northbound
D6.3		Sri Petaling I/C	Shah Alam Expressway – Subang Jaya, Shah Alam, Klang, Pulau Indah; FT 28 Kuala Lumpur Middle Ring Road 2 – Cheras, Ampang, Kuantan	
	BR	Sungai Mindah bridge		
		National Sports Complex car park	National Sports Complex car park –	Northbound
D7.2	L/B	Petronas L/B	Petronas – Petronas McDonald's - Dunkin' Donuts	Northbound
D7.8		Technology Park I/C	FT 217 Bukit Jalil Highway – Puchong, Bandar Kinrara, National Sports Complex, Selangor Turf Club, Mines Resort City, Seri Kembangan	
D7.9	L/B	Shell, Petron and Nouvelle Hotel L/B	Shell, Petron and Nouvelle Hotel L/B – Shell Petron McDonald's	Southbound
		Sungai Besi–Seremban	see also North–South Expressway Southern Route	
Through to North–South Expressway Southern Route
