= Taman OUG =

Township in Kuala Lumpur, Malaysia

Coordinates: 3.107178°N 101.71649°E

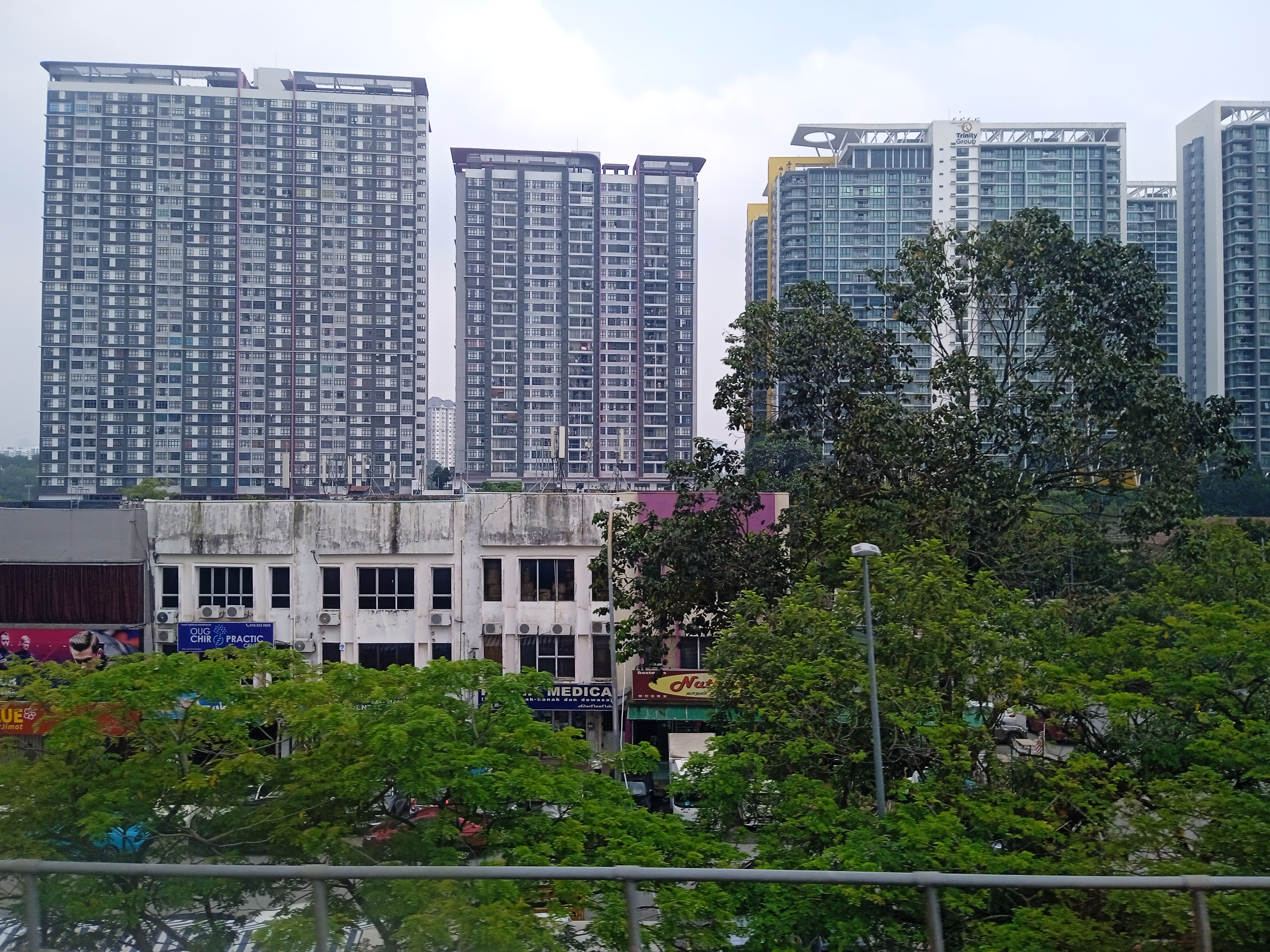
Taman OUG

Overseas Union Garden, also known as OUG and Taman Overseas Union, is a main township in the Seputeh constituency in south-western Kuala Lumpur, Malaysia. Situated mainly atop a hill, this township is located along Old Klang Road roughly halfway between Kuala Lumpur and Subang Jaya, and was opened in the mid-1970s.

== Places of interest ==
Just down the hill lies Plaza OUG, the largest shopping mall in the locality, which once contained a Parkson (previously known as Yaohan) store. One can climb the hill and have a grandiose view of the whole garden.

The residential roads here used to be in numbers (Jalan 1 to 40). However the local authorities decided to rename them to Hujan Emas (golden rain), Hujan Abu, Hujan Batu, Hujan Gerimis, Hujan Manik, Hujan Bubuk and so on.

On Thursday nights, there is a night market (pasar malam) selling various hawker food, affordable apparels, decorations, daily usage items and toys.

== Recent developments ==
Several roads connecting OUG to Bukit Jalil and Sri Petaling, most notably Jalan Awan Besar, were added, after several years of having the project delayed. These new stretch of roads reduced the traveling time of at least 10–15 minutes. In the past, to get to either Sri Petaling or Bukit Jalil, one needed to pass through the neighbouring residential area Happy Garden.

There are rows of shop lots in OUG. Some of the shops in OUG are Kin San Kopitiam, 7-Eleven, Guardian Pharmacy, Kedai Gunting OUG, Restaurant New Sun Ho (coffee shop), Simon Poon Agency (General Insurance), Wow Wow Pets Shop, Caring Pharmacy and Kedai Runcit Fah Lian (grocery shop).

The surrounding area which Plaza OUG and Central Plaza are located in has seen the mushrooming of eateries and nightlife activities. Most notable is Citrus Park containing Station 1 Cafe and a McDonald's. Plaza OUG has since been demolished to make way for an upcoming apartment project.

The Market Place, OUG is a new five-storey complex in Taman OUG, which will house a wet and dry market. Other features include a food court, Chinese restaurant, sports and recreational facilities as well as basement carpark.

Most recently as of 2026, OUG received her first fast-food joint; a McDonald's built next to (what used to be) the BHP carwash, which has since been repurposed for the fast-food joint.

== Places of sports and leisure ==
The MCA hall is popular for tai chi exercise. On certain nights, dance classes are also conducted inside the hall.

There are 2 basketball courts, one of which is located just opposite the Sun Kam Kee (formerly Hup Kee) Restaurant. For badminton enthusiasts, SJK (C) Yoke Nam, a primary school on Jalan Hujan Emas 6 provides a 5-court capacity hall for rent from 6pm to midnight, 6 days a week, excluding Sundays. For cyber gamers, there are also numerous cybercafes scattered around OUG.

There is also a woodball course directly opposite the MCA hall. It was the first woodball course built in Malaysia, by Thomas Kok. In the year 2013 the course hosted its first woodball competition, SUKAN MALAYSIA XVI, KUALA LUMPUR 2013.

== Shopping Malls ==
The Pearl Point Shopping Mall, Pearl Gallery, and Plaza OUG are the shopping highlights within the radius of OUG. They are located at the junction between Jalan Klang Lama and the main entrance connecting to OUG. Through the slip roads which recently opened, the residents can also get to Endah Parade much faster. Within 10 to 15 minutes drive from OUG is the much popular Mid Valley Megamall and The Gardens (Kuala Lumpur) shopping malls. Since mid-2011, The Scott Garden, a 3-level high end lifestyle retail circle was opened along Jalan Klang Lama, adding to the hustle and bustle area leading to OUG. WCT is building Paradigm OUG along Kesas Highway. Located slightly further away across the Kesas Highway lies Pavilion Bukit Jalil.

Plaza OUG, the oldest mall in the area, was closed in August 2022 and is in the process of demolition for a new mixed development with residential and commercial components.

== Major Neighbouring Districts ==
Two of the best-known neighbouring districts of OUG are Sri Petaling and Bukit Jalil suburbs. Bukit Jalil is where the Technology Park Malaysia is located and many well-known IT companies are headquartered there. Also, the Bukit Jalil National Stadium, which hosted the 1998 Commonwealth Games and 2017 Southeast Asian Games is also located here.

== Transport ==
The main road of Overseas Union Garden is Jalan Awan Besar, which has direct connections to Jalan Klang Lama via Jalan Gembira, and Shah Alam Expressway.

The area is roughly about 15 to 20 minutes drive away (via the Maju Expressway ) to Bukit Bintang in downtown Kuala Lumpur. The KESAS runs through the southern boundary of this township, while the NPE which runs through the northern flank and parallel to the KTM tracks, is a shortcut to Subang Jaya and Shah Alam.

While there are no rail stations directly serving the area, Awan Besar station on the LRT Sri Petaling Line and Petaling station on the KTM Komuter Tanjong Malim-Port Klang Line are both roughly adjacent to the area.
