= Al-Madinah International University =

Private university in Malaysia

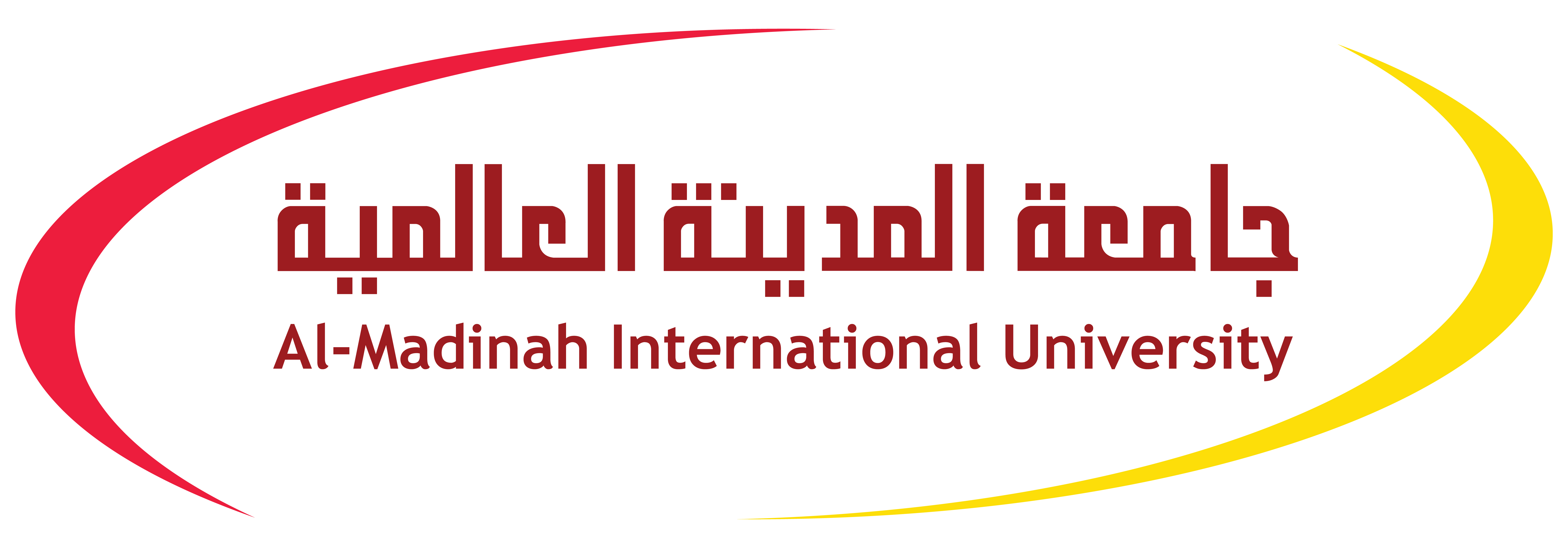
- Motto: Your Gateway to Borderless Learning
- Type: Private
- Established: 2006
- Location: No. 18, Jalan 2/125e, Taman Desa Petaling, 57100 Kuala Lumpur, Wilayah Persekutuan Kuala Lumpur, Malaysia, Kuala Lumpur (main campus), Federal Territory, Malaysia; 3°05′01″N 101°42′02″E
- Campus: Malaysia
- Website: www.mediu.edu.my

The Al-Madinah International University (MEDIU; Malay: Universiti Antarabangsa Al-Madinah ; Arabic: جامعة المدينة العالمية) is an independent educational institution in Malaysia. It was established in 2006, founded on Islamic principles and values.

MEDIU is licensed by the Ministry of Higher Education (MOHE), government of Malaysia. Its programs are accredited by the Malaysian Qualification Agency (MQA). The university aims for knowledge development and intellectual exchange consistent with international level of excellence. It is managed by Vice Chancellor Dato Dr. Alhazmi Saeed Nowifea. It is one of the top five online universities in Malaysia.

MEDIU offers academic programs on campus and online.

== History ==
Founded in 2006, on June 20, 2007, Al-Madinah International University completed all final accreditation and registration procedures with the Malaysian Ministry of Higher Education (MOHE). In 2008, the first cohort enrolled at the university, and the university launched more faculties and academic programs in fields such as: Islamic Sciences, Languages, Financial and Administrative Sciences, Computer Science and Information Technology, and a Language Center. The university began foundational steps to launch on-campus education in new scientific and applied disciplines, including Computer Science and Financial and Administrative Sciences. In 2010, direct (on-campus) education began, with the first batch enrolled in September 2010. In 2011, the first cohort of graduates completed their studies in the Faculty of Languages and Islamic Sciences.

== Vice Chancellor ==
Al-Madinah International University is headed by the Honorable Dato Dr. Alhazmi Saeed Nowifea.

=== Research programs ===
MEDIU offers postgraduate research programs at Master's and Doctoral levels across more than 35 areas of study, spanning faculties including Islamic Sciences, Languages, Finance and Administrative Sciences, Computer Science and Information Technology, Education, and Engineering.

== Methods of study ==
- On-campus learning is used at Al-Madinah International University (MEDIU) for educational programs for which the student has to be at a campus at a specific time to follow the programs, with the assistance of the teacher, professor, or teaching assistant. See MEDIU Academic Staff.
- Online learning is based on an authentic system of learning and evaluation process. Students physically appear in mid-term and final-term exams in authorized exam centers of their respective countries, finalized by the university. The learning method includes all forms of electronically supported learning and teaching, including Edtech. Students have to participate in classes through technology. They are required to meet the minimum requirement (70%) of class attendance.

== See also ==
- List of Islamic educational institutions
