= Lembah Pantai =

Pantai Valley

Other transcription(s)
- Location within Malaysia
- Coordinates: 3°6′40″N 101°40′15″E

Government
  - Local Authority: Dewan Bandaraya Kuala Lumpur
- Time zone: UTC+8 (MST)

Lembah Pantai is a sub-district and parliamentary constituency in south-western Kuala Lumpur, Malaysia. Constituencies adjacent to Lembah Pantai are Seputeh, Segambut and Bukit Bintang. The total number of population is 148,094 as of 2020 census.

== Demographics ==
Ethnic composition of Lembah Pantai (2020)
Ethnicities / Nationality	Percentage
Malays	54.16%
Other Bumiputeras	0.95%
Chinese	24.44%
Indians	12.86%
Others	0.79%
Non-Malaysians	6.79%

Ethnicity	2020	
Ethnicity	Pop.	%
Malays	80206	54.16%
Other Bumiputeras	1406	0.95%
Chinese	36201	24.44%
Indians	19051	12.86%
Others	1177	0.79%
Malaysian total	138041	93.21%
Non-Malaysian	10053	6.79%
Total	148094	100.00%

== Divisions ==
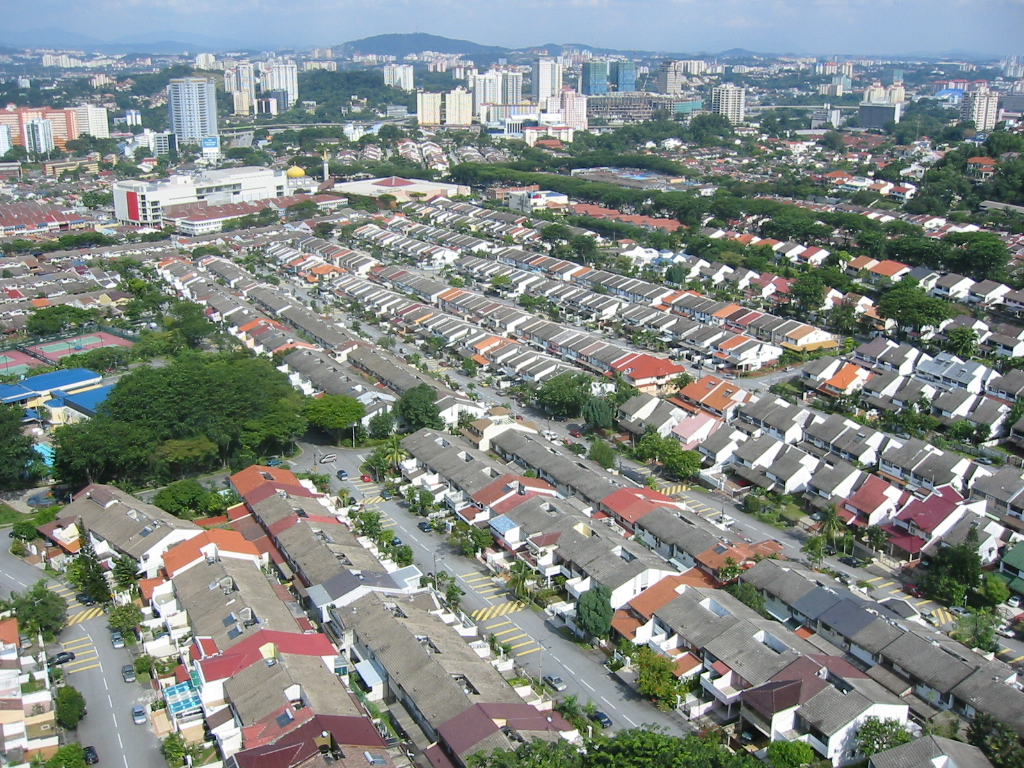
Bangsar in Lembah Pantai

=== Bangsar ===
One of the more popular areas which come under Lembah Pantai constituency is Bangsar, a popular upmarket residential and entertainment area.

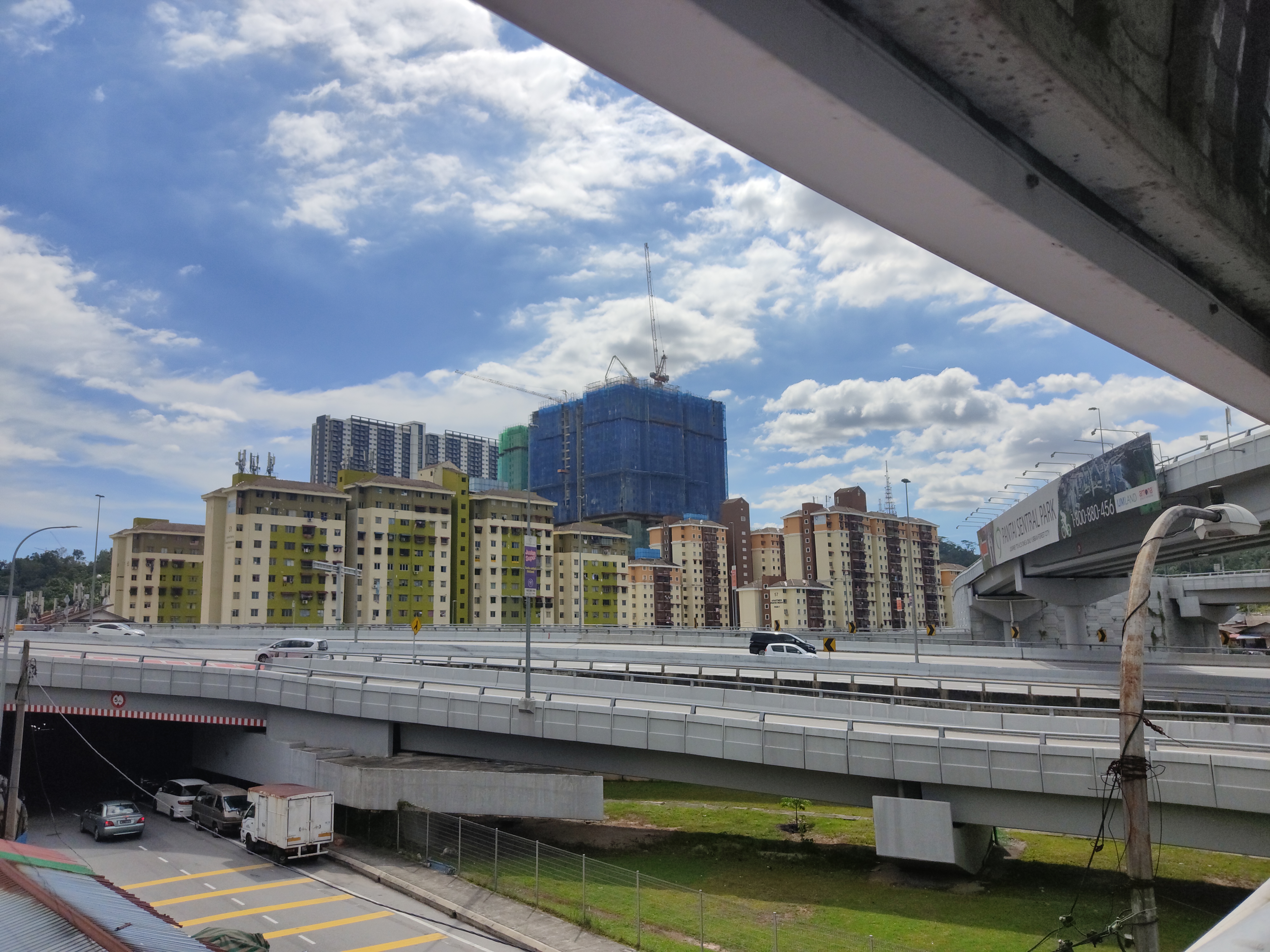
High-rise buildings in the southern part of Pantai Dalam

=== Pantai Dalam ===
Pantai Dalam is a residential area located south of Bangsar. There are many smaller residential areas that form the larger residential area of Pantai Dalam, including:

- Pantai Hillpark
- Kampung Pantai
- PPR Sri Pantai
- PPR Pantai Ria
- Desa Aman 1 & 2
- Pantai Murni
- Taman Bukit Angkasa
- Pantai Baru
- Kampung Pasir
- Taman Pantai Dalam
- Taman Pantai Indah
- PPR Kampung Limau
- Kampung Dato'Tatah

Pantai Dalam watershed between two groups of urban Malays: the affluent and the working class. The former live mainly in condominiums like the Andalusia Condominium in Pantai Hillpark, or in bungalows in Kampung Pantai and Pantai Halt.

For the working class, the luxury apartments located further uphill are perhaps symbols of what one can aspire to. Most of them live in the low-cost apartments.

Most of the area's residents are:

- blue-collar workers living in flats that had been sold to them under the People's Housing Project when they were resettled from their squatter homes several years ago.
- students of the University of Malaya.
- police officers/personnels, mainly in Desa Aman 1 & 2.

Some squatters are still waiting to buy homes under this project, which was announced by Prime Minister Abdullah Ahmad Badawi prior to the 12th Malaysian general election, 2008.

Pantai Dalam is well connected to the other parts of Klang Valley via the New Pantai Expressway and the Federal Highway.

Other divisions which are part of the Lembah Pantai constituency are Bangsar South, Bukit Aman, Bukit Persekutuan, KL Eco City, Mid Valley City and Perdana Botanical Gardens.

== Transportation ==
=== Public transport ===
- 4 LRT stations for 5 Kelana Jaya Line: KJ16 Bangsar, KJ17 Abdullah Hukum, KJ18 Kerinchi and KJ19 Universiti LRT stations.
- 3 KTM stations for 2 Port Klang Line: KD01 Abdullah Hukum, KD02 Angkasapuri and KD03 Pantai Dalam Komuter stations.
- Only 1 KTM station for 1 Seremban Line: KB01 Mid Valley Komuter station.

=== Car ===
- Few major highways which cuts through most parts of the district includes the New Pantai Expressway (NPE) and Federal Highway.
- In the future, a new highway known as Setiawangsa–Pantai Expressway (SPE) will be opened, currently under construction.

== Politics ==
The current Member of Parliament for the Lembah Pantai parliamentary constituency is Fahmi Fadzil from Pakatan Harapan, who won the seat in the 2018 Malaysian general election.
