= Jalan Klang Lama =

Road in Malaysia

Selangor Route 14
- Jalan Klang Lama
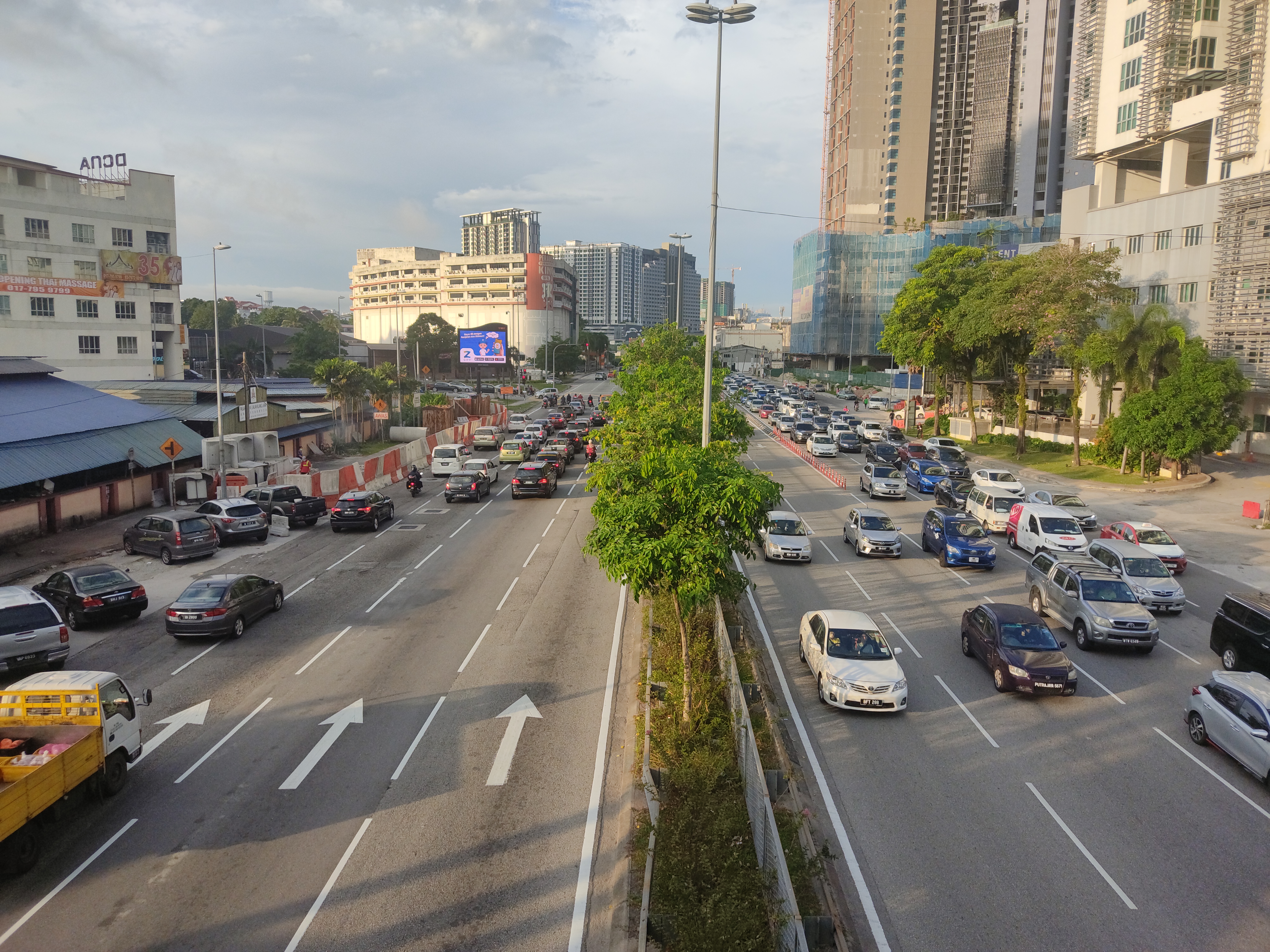

Route information
- Existed: 1956–present
- History: Completed in 1959

Major junctions
- West end: PJS 8, Petaling Jaya, Selangor
- New Pantai Expressway; B11 Jalan Puchong–Petaling Jaya; Jalan Kuchai Lama; FT 2 Federal Highway; East–West Link Expressway; FT 2 Jalan Syed Putra
- East end: Seputeh, Kuala Lumpur

Location
- Country: Malaysia
- Primary destinations: Petaling Jaya, Puchong, OUG, Kuchai Lama

Highway system
- Highways in Malaysia; Expressways; Federal; State

Jalan Klang Lama or Old Klang Road, Selangor State Route B14, formerly part of Federal Route 2 is the oldest and the first major road in Kuala Lumpur, Malaysia. It was built before the Federal Highway was built in 1965. The road was constructed by the Federation of Malaya government from 1956 to 1959. The road was opened on 14 January 1959 by the Minister of Public Works, Sardon Jubir. This road passes through two towns, namely Sungai Way and Petaling Jaya.

== History ==
The Kuala Lumpur–Klang Highway FT2 was opened to traffic on 14 January 1959. The highway was intended as a replacement of the existing road system known as Jalan Klang Lama, Persiaran Selangor, Jalan Sungai Rasau and Jalan Batu Tiga Lama, allowing speeds of up to 60 mph. As a result, Jalan Klang Lama was downgraded into Selangor State Road B14. The Kuala Lumpur–Klang Highway FT2 was later being upgraded into a controlled-access highway by replacing the former at-grade intersection with grade-separated interchanges, making the highway as the nation's first controlled-access expressway. The upgraded controlled-access highway is now known as the Federal Highway Route 2.

== Landmarks ==
- Mid Valley Megamall
- JKL Furnishing Centre
- The Scott Garden
- Pearl Point
- Eco Park
- Southbank

== Residential ==
South Bank Residence Old Klang Road. 58000 Kuala Lumpur.

== Junction lists ==
Legend:

- I/C - Interchange, I/S - Intersection, RSA - Rest and service area, OBR - Overhead bridge restaurant, R/R - Restaurant and rest plaza, L/B - Layby, V/P - Vista point, TN - tunnel, T/P - Toll plaza, BR - Bridge
- C - Cloverleaf, S - Stack, T-A - Trumpet-A, T-B - Trumpet-B, DT - Directional-T/Y, SDT - Semi-Directional-T/Y, P-Y - Partial-Y, D - Diamond, P-C - Partial cloverleaf, D-D - Diverging diamond, D-R - Direct ramp

State/territory	District	Location	km	mi	Exit	Name	Destinations	Notes
Selangor	Petaling	Petaling Jaya				PJS 8	Damansara–Puchong Expressway – Bandar Sunway, Puchong, Putrajaya, Cyberjaya	LILO
Selangor	Petaling	Petaling Jaya				Kontena Nasional		
Selangor	Petaling	Petaling Jaya				PJS 6		
Selangor	Petaling	Petaling Jaya				Heineken Malaysia (GAB) brewery		
Selangor	Petaling	Petaling Jaya				Seri Setia Komuter station	P&R	
Selangor	Petaling	Petaling Jaya			Sungai Penchala bridge			
Selangor	Petaling	Petaling Jaya			Jalan Templer–Taman Dato' Harun see also New Pantai Expressway			
Selangor	Petaling	Petaling Jaya				Jalan Templer	Jalan Templer – Petaling Jaya city centre, Petaling Jaya old town	T-junctions on the below flyover
Selangor	Petaling	Petaling Jaya				Taman Ganapuram	Jalan 18/15 – Taman Ganapuram	T-junctions
Kuala Lumpur	Seputeh	Kuchai				Jalan Taman Seri Sentosa	Jalan Taman Seri Sentosa – Taman Seri Sentosa	T-junctions
Kuala Lumpur	Seputeh	Kuchai				Kampung Pasir	Jalan Kampung Pasir – Kampung Pasir; P&R Petaling Komuter station	
Kuala Lumpur	Seputeh	Kuchai			Sungai Klang bridge			
Kuala Lumpur	Seputeh	Kuchai				Jalan Klang Lama Police Station		
Kuala Lumpur	Seputeh	Kuchai				Jalan Puchong–Petaling Jaya	B11 Jalan Puchong–Petaling Jaya – Bandar Kinrara, Puchong, Sungai Besi, Putrajaya, Cyberjaya	T-junctions
Kuala Lumpur	Seputeh	Kuchai				Taman OUG	Taman OUG	T-junctions
Kuala Lumpur	Seputeh	Kuchai				Jalan Kuchai Lama	Jalan Kuchai Lama – Salak South; North–South Expressway Southern Route / AH2 – Kuala Lumpur International Airport (KLIA), Seremban, Malacca, Johor Bahru	T-junctions
Kuala Lumpur	Seputeh	Kuchai				Seputeh	FT 2 Federal Highway – Bangsar, Petaling Jaya, Shah Alam, Klang; East–West Link Expressway – Cheras, Kajang; North–South Expressway Southern Route / AH2 – Kuala Lumpur International Airport (KLIA), Seremban, Malacca, Johor Bahru	Stacked interchange
Kuala Lumpur	Lembah Pantai	Bangsar			Through to FT 2 Jalan Syed Putra (Lornie Drive)			
1.000 mi = 1.609 km; 1.000 km = 0.621 mi: Concurrency terminus; Incomplete access

== See also ==
- Jalan Syed Putra
- Federal Highway
- Malaysia Federal Route 2
