= New Pantai Expressway =

Highway in Malaysia

Expressway 10
- New Pantai Expressway; Lebuhraya Baru Pantai; Lebuhraya NPE 新班低谷大道

Route information
- Maintained by New Pantai Expressway Sdn Bhd
- Length: 19.6 km (12.2 mi) Main route: 14.0 km (8.7 mi); Salak link: 5.6 km (3.5 mi)
- Existed: 2000–present
- History: Completed in 2004

Major junctions
- Southwest end: Persiaran Tujuan at Subang Jaya, Selangor
- Persiaran Kewajipan; Damansara–Puchong Expressway; FT 2 Federal Highway; B14 Jalan Klang Lama; Jalan Kuchai Lama; Kuala Lumpur–Seremban Expressway; Maju Expressway
- Northeast end: Jalan Bangsar at Bangsar, Kuala Lumpur

Location
- Country: Malaysia
- Primary destinations: USJ, Subang Jaya, Bandar Sunway, Petaling Jaya, Kuchai Lama, Pantai Dalam, Pantai Bahru, Bangsar, Kuala Lumpur

Highway system
- Highways in Malaysia; Expressways; Federal; State

The E10 New Pantai Expressway (Malay: Lebuhraya Baru Pantai) (known as NPE), is a controlled-access highway in the Klang Valley region of Peninsular Malaysia. The 19.6-kilometre (12.2-mile) expressway runs parallel to the Federal Highway, between Subang Jaya, Selangor in the southwest and Bangsar, Kuala Lumpur in the northeast.

== History and pioneer routes ==
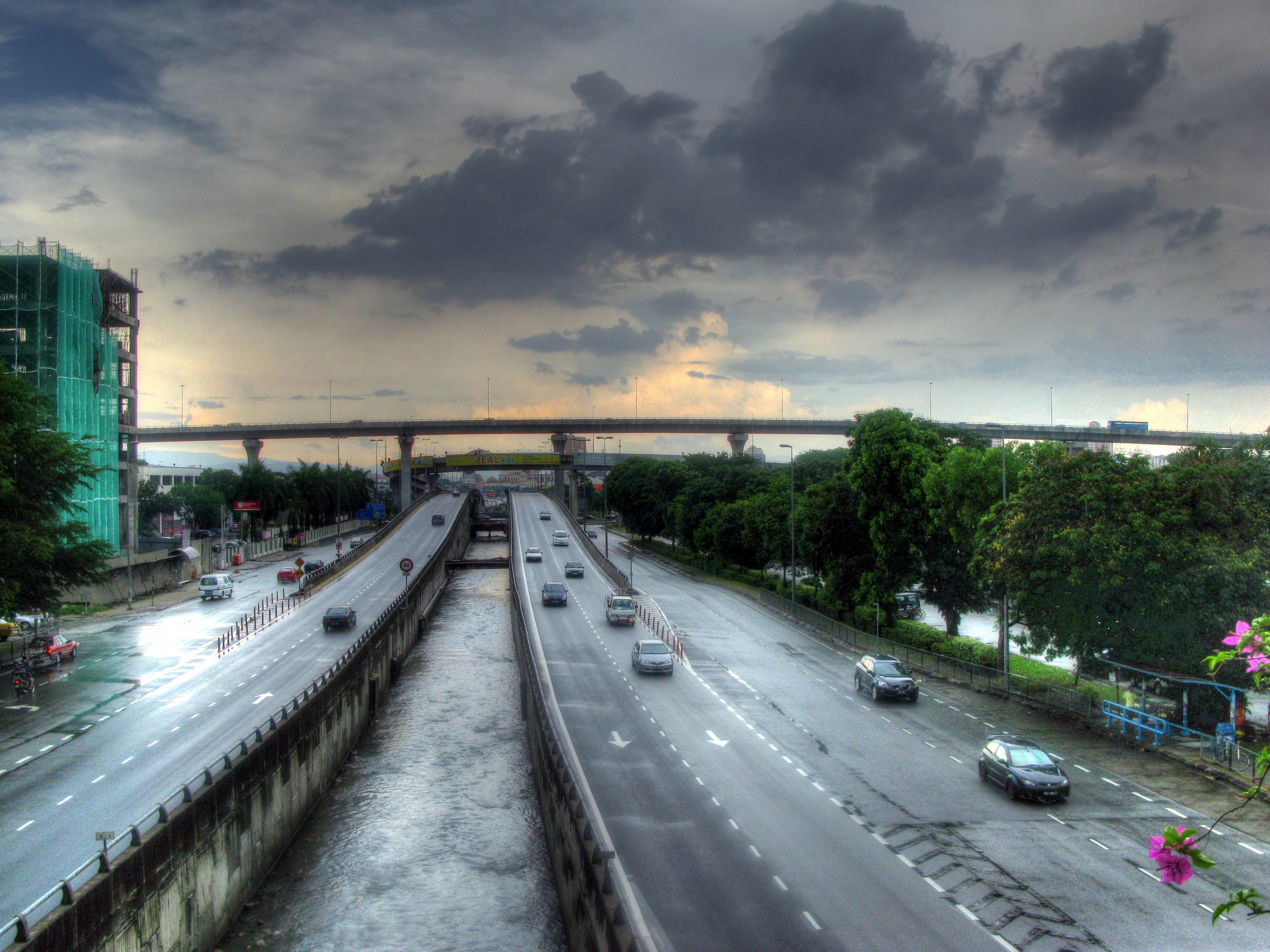
New Pantai Expressway near Subang Jaya.

The expressway was known as Jalan Subang Utama (Persiaran Tujuan–PJS), Jalan Klang Lama (Federal Highway–Jalan Templer side) and Jalan Pantai Dalam (Jalan Bangsar–Kampung Pantai Dalam side). The project was awarded to Maxtro Engineering Sdn Bhd, a subsidiary of Berjaya Group but it was handed over to the new concessionaire, New Pantai Expressway Sdn Bhd, a subsidiary of IJM Corporation Berhad in 2002.

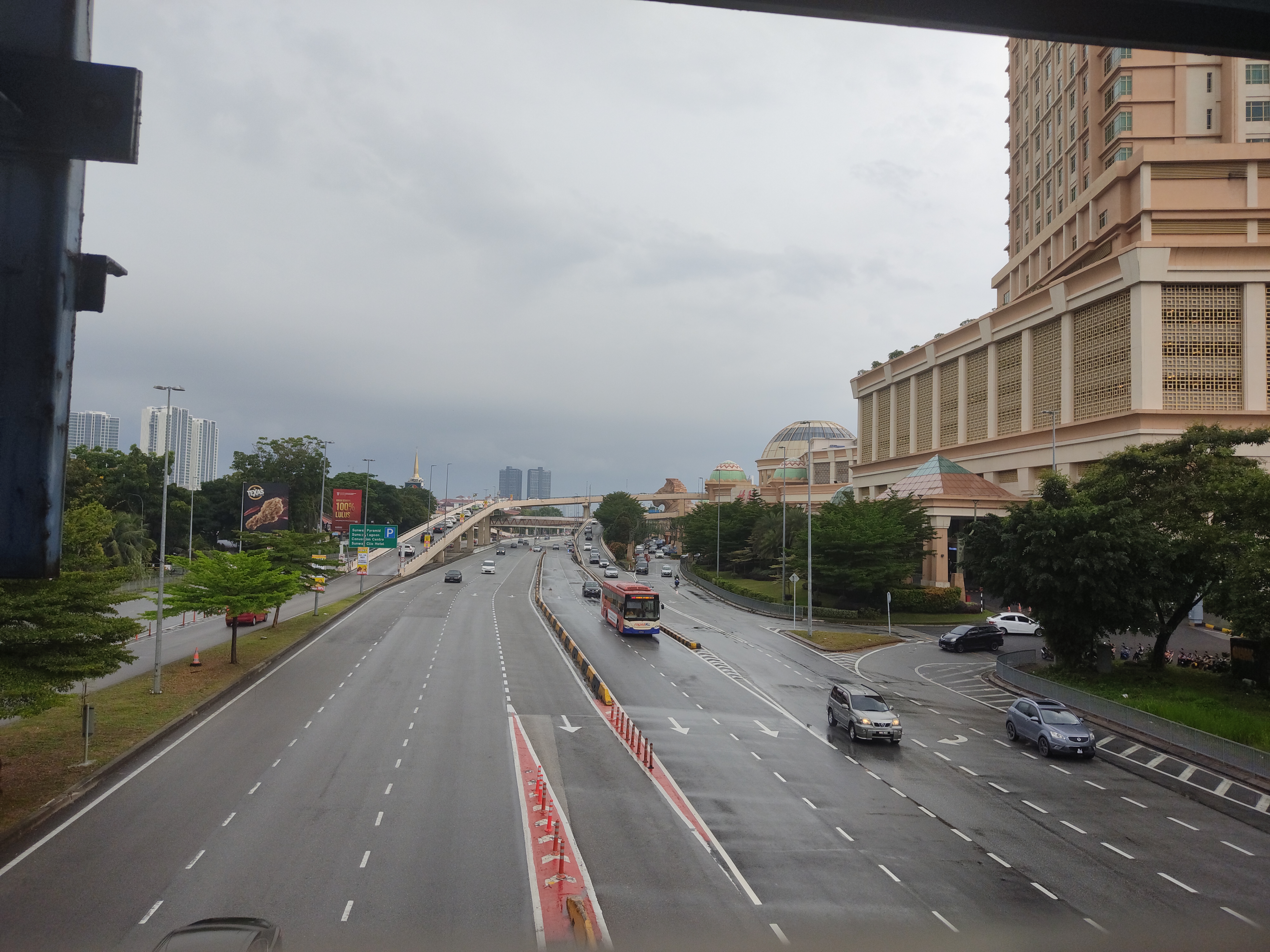
New Pantai Expressway Sunway section

It was constructed between 2000 and 2004. Construction of the expressways was led by Road Builder (M) Holdings Berhad (RBH) which in 2007 was acquired by IJM Corporation Berhad. Phase 1, which is between Jengka roundabout and Bandar Sunway was completed in 2002. The next sections from Bandar Sunway to Pantai Baharu (Phase 2) and Pantai to Salak South (Phase 3: Salak Link) were completed in 2003. During construction, the concessionaire temporarily relocated 2,000 squatters in Pantai Dalam while building them 980 low-cost apartments close to their settlement. The expressway was officially opened on 30 April 2004.

Tujuan Interchange which replaced a T-junction was constructed between 2004 and 2006. The Bulatan Gasing ramp from NPE to Jalan Gasing was also constructed between 2004 and 2006. A special ramp to Sunway Pyramid's parking floor was constructed between January and November 2007. It was opened in December 2007.

=== Original routes ===
The construction of the New Pantai Expressway includes the acquisition and upgrades of several major roads as follows:-

Highway shield	Roads	Sections
	Jalan Subang Utama	Persiaran Tujuan–PJS
B14	Jalan Klang Lama	Federal Highway–Jalan Templer
	Jalan Pantai Dalam	Jalan Bangsar–Kampung Pantai Dalam

== Features ==
Among its features are a flyover towards Bangsar and the Kewajipan Ramp, a ramp from Jalan Kewajipan to the expressway. There are no laybys and rest and service areas on this expressway. Another feature is the shopping complex landmark at Bandar Sunway, Sunway Pyramid. In December 2007 the special ramp to the Sunway Pyramid's parking floor was opened. The Indah Water Konsortium's Sewerage Treatment Plant Pantai Dalam is located along the expressway.

== Controversial issues ==
=== Kampung Dato' Harun toll plaza near Taman Medan ===
About 50 people in Petaling Jaya Selatan staged a peaceful rally at the New Pantai Expressway's (NPE) Kampung Dato' Harun toll plaza near Taman Medan here, demanding the NPE toll be abolished as it was burdening the people, especially nearby residents. Acting Petaling Jaya Selatan UMNO chief Raja Datuk Hanipuddin Raja Datuk Nong Chik said the residents had to spend an average of RM500 monthly on the toll.

"They have to pay RM1.60, even though their houses are located just 200m from the toll plaza. The toll charge is probably the highest in the Klang Valley," he said.

On 13 February 2009, the PJS 2 toll plaza for Kuala Lumpur-bound was abolished. This was at the request of the government following complaints from nearby residents who had no alternative route in a Kuala Lumpur-bound direction and were thus compelled to pay too frequently. The government agreed to abolish the toll plaza from Sunway Pyramid heading towards Kuala Lumpur beginning 00.01 hours 14 February 2009.

== Tolls ==
The New Pantai Expressway uses opened toll systems.

As part of an initiative to facilitate faster transaction at the Pantai Dalam, PJS 5 and PJS 2 Toll Plaza, all toll transactions at three toll plazas on the New Pantai Expressway will be conducted electronically via Touch 'n Go cards or SmartTAGs starting 13 January 2016.

=== Toll rates ===
(Since 15 October 2015)

Class	Types of vehicles	Rate (in Malaysian Ringgit (RM))		
Class	Types of vehicles	PJS 5	PJS 2	Pantai Dalam
0	Motorcycles (Vehicles with two axles and two wheels)	Free		
1	Private Cars (Vehicles with two axles and three or four wheels (excluding taxis and buses))	2.30	1.00	2.30
2	Vans and other small goods vehicles (Vehicles with two axles and six wheels (excluding buses))	4.60		
3	Large Trucks (Vehicles with three or more axles (excluding buses))	6.90		
4	Taxis	1.20		
5	Buses	1.60		

== Junction lists ==
Only major junctions are listed in these tables.

Legend:

- I/C - Interchange, I/S - Intersection, RSA - Rest and service area, OBR - Overhead bridge restaurant, R/R - Restaurant and rest plaza, L/B - Layby, V/P - Vista point, TN - tunnel, T/P - Toll plaza, BR - Bridge
- C - Cloverleaf, S - Stack, T-A - Trumpet-A, T-B - Trumpet-B, DT - Directional-T/Y, SDT - Semi-Directional-T/Y, P-Y - Partial-Y, D - Diamond, P-C - Partial cloverleaf, D-D - Diverging diamond, D-R - Direct ramp

State/territory	District	Location	km	mi	Exit	Name	Destinations	Notes
Selangor	Petaling	Subang Jaya			1001	–	Persiaran Tujuan – Subang Jaya (SS18, SS19), UEP Subang Jaya, Glenmarie, Shah Alam	
Selangor	Petaling	Subang Jaya	0.0	0.0	–	–	Persiaran Jengka – Subang Jaya (SS12, SS13, SS14, SS15, SS17, SS18)	
Selangor	Petaling	Subang Jaya	0.8	0.50	1002	–	Persiaran Kewajipan – Subang Jaya (SS12, SS13, SS14, SS15), UEP Subang Jaya, Sri Petaling, Shah Alam	
Selangor	Petaling	Subang Jaya	2.2	1.4	–	–	Service road – Sunway Pyramid	
Selangor	Petaling	Subang Jaya	3.0	1.9	1003	–	Damansara–Puchong Expressway – Bandar Sunway, Kelana Jaya, Damansara, Petaling Jaya, Shah Alam, Putrajaya	
Selangor	Petaling	Petaling Jaya	4.0	2.5	Penchala River bridge			
Selangor	Petaling	Petaling Jaya	4.2	2.6	PJS 5 toll plaza (barrier system; eastbound)			
Selangor	Petaling	Petaling Jaya			–	–	FT 2 Federal Highway – Kelana Jaya, Shah Alam; B14 Jalan Klang Lama – Kampung Medan, Petaling Jaya (PJS 2)	Westbound exit and eastbound entrance only Western terminus of concurrency with B14
Selangor	Petaling	Petaling Jaya			PJS 2 toll plaza (barrier system; westbound)			
Selangor	Petaling	Petaling Jaya	7.6	4.7	1005	Taman Maju Jaya I/C	Jalan PJS 2/12 – Taman Maju Jaya, Petaling Jaya (PJS 2, 3, 4)	Westbound exit and eastbound entrance only
Selangor	Petaling	Petaling Jaya	19.1	11.9	1006	Jalan Templer I/C	Jalan Templer – Petaling Jaya; B14 Jalan Klang Lama – Section 18, Taman Seri Sentosa	No westbound exit Eastern terminus of concurrency with B14
Kuala Lumpur	Lembah Pantai	Pantai Dalam	19.8	12.3	–	–	Jalan Kampung Pasir – Bandar Kinrara, Puchong	Westbound exit and eastbound entrance only
Kuala Lumpur	Lembah Pantai	Pantai Dalam	10.1	6.3	Pantai Dalam toll plaza (barrier system)			
Kuala Lumpur	Lembah Pantai	Pantai Dalam	10.6	6.6	–	–	New Pantai Expressway (Salak Link) – Seremban, Sungai Besi, Kuchai Lama	
Kuala Lumpur	Lembah Pantai	Pantai Dalam	11.4	7.1	–	–	Jalan Kubur – Pantai Sentral; Jalan Pantai Dalam – Pantai Dalam	No northbound exit and southbound entrance to/from Jalan Pantai Dalam
Kuala Lumpur	Lembah Pantai	Pantai Dalam	12.1	7.5	1008	Lembah Pantai I/C	Jalan Pantai Permai – Bukit Kerinchi, Kampung Pasir Baru	
Kuala Lumpur	Lembah Pantai	Bangsar	12.8	8.0	–	–	FT 2 Jalan Syed Putra – No access	Southbound entrance from northeast only
Kuala Lumpur	Lembah Pantai	Bangsar	13.1	8.1	1009	Pantai Baharu I/C	Jalan Pantai Baharu – Kerinchi, KL Eco City	
Kuala Lumpur	Lembah Pantai	Bangsar			Through to Jalan Bangsar			
1.000 mi = 1.609 km; 1.000 km = 0.621 mi: Concurrency terminus; Incomplete access; Route transition; Unopened

=== Salak link ===
The entire route is located in Kuala Lumpur.

District	Location	km	mi	Exit	Name	Destinations	Notes
Lembah Pantai	Pantai Dalam	10.6	6.6	–	Main Link	New Pantai Expressway – Subang Jaya, Bandar Sunway, Petaling Jaya, central Kuala Lumpur, Bangsar, Pantai Dalam	
Seputeh	Kuchai Lama	16.6	10.3	1007A	Jalan Kuchai Lama	Jalan Kuchai Lama – Kuchai Lama, Sungai Besi	
Seputeh	Kuchai Lama	17.0	10.6	–	Salak South	Kuala Lumpur–Seremban Expressway – central Kuala Lumpur, Petaling Jaya, Seremban, Sungai Besi; Maju Expressway – Kuala Lumpur International Airport, Putrajaya, Cyberjaya	No exit to E20 northbound or entrance from E20 southbound
1.000 mi = 1.609 km; 1.000 km = 0.621 mi: Concurrency terminus; Incomplete access; Unopened
