= Kuchai Lama =

Suburb in Kuala Lumpur, Malaysia

Coordinates: 3.0892184°N 101.6877131°E

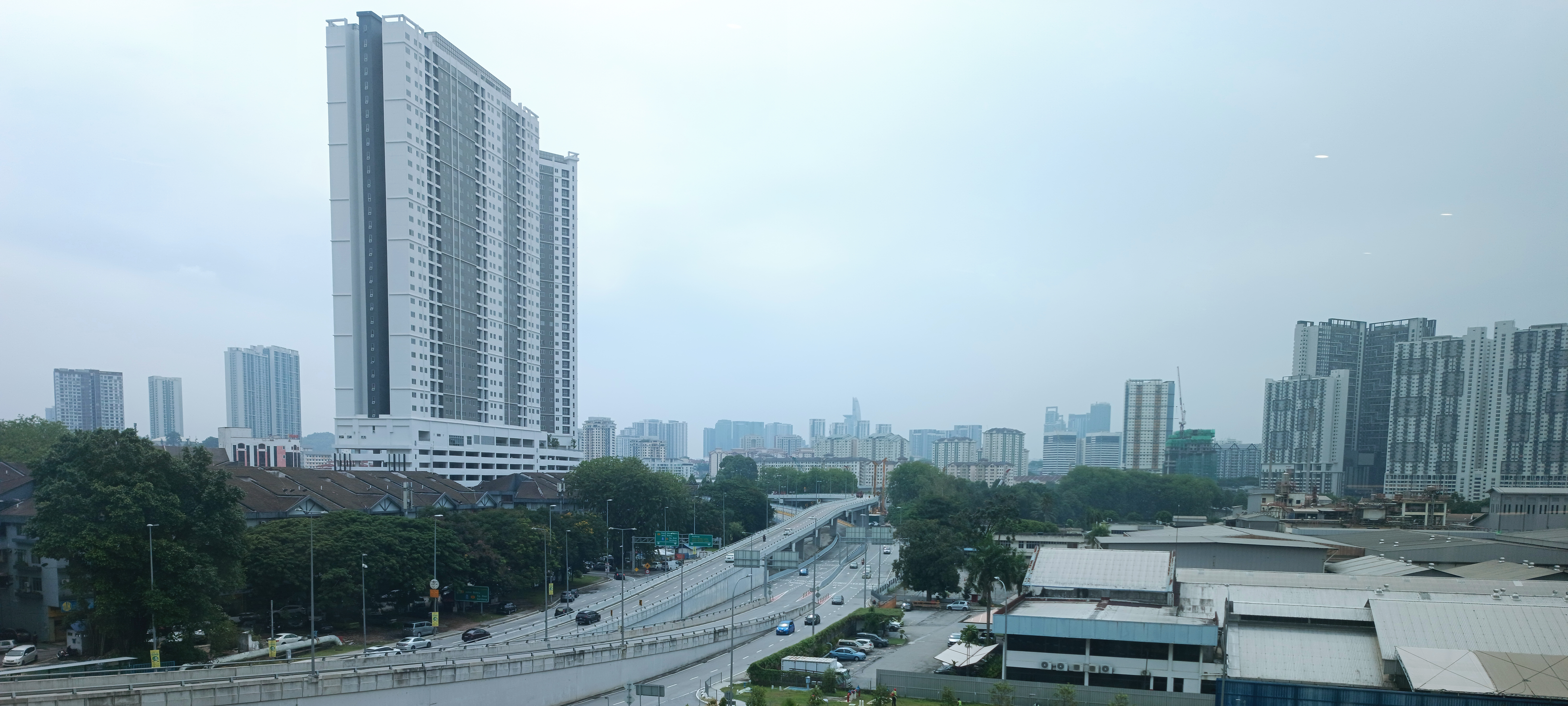
Kuchai Lama skyline

Kuchai Lama, or simply Kuchai, is a suburb in Seputeh constituency in south-western Kuala Lumpur, Malaysia, located near the Old Klang Road. It is also known as a foreigner's paradise because of its density, which is full of foreigners who may or may not have legal documents.

This suburb is situated 8 km away from Kuala Lumpur City Centre. It is adjacent to Taman Desa, Pantai Dalam, Taman OUG, and Salak South. Ajinomoto's Malaysian plant is located here.

== Townships ==
- Taman Goodwood
- Taman Lian Hoe
- Taman Continental
- Taman Pagar Ruyong
- Taman Kuchai Jaya
- Kuchai Entrepreneurs Park (Kuchai Lama Town)
- Happy Garden (rarely referred to as Taman Gembira)
- Taman Salak South
- Taman Naga Emas

== Access ==
Kuchai is next to an intersection of four toll roads - PLUS toll road, New Pantai Expressway, BESRAYA toll road and Maju toll road (Kuala Lumpur - Cyberjaya - Putrajaya).

=== Public transportation ===
==== Railway ====
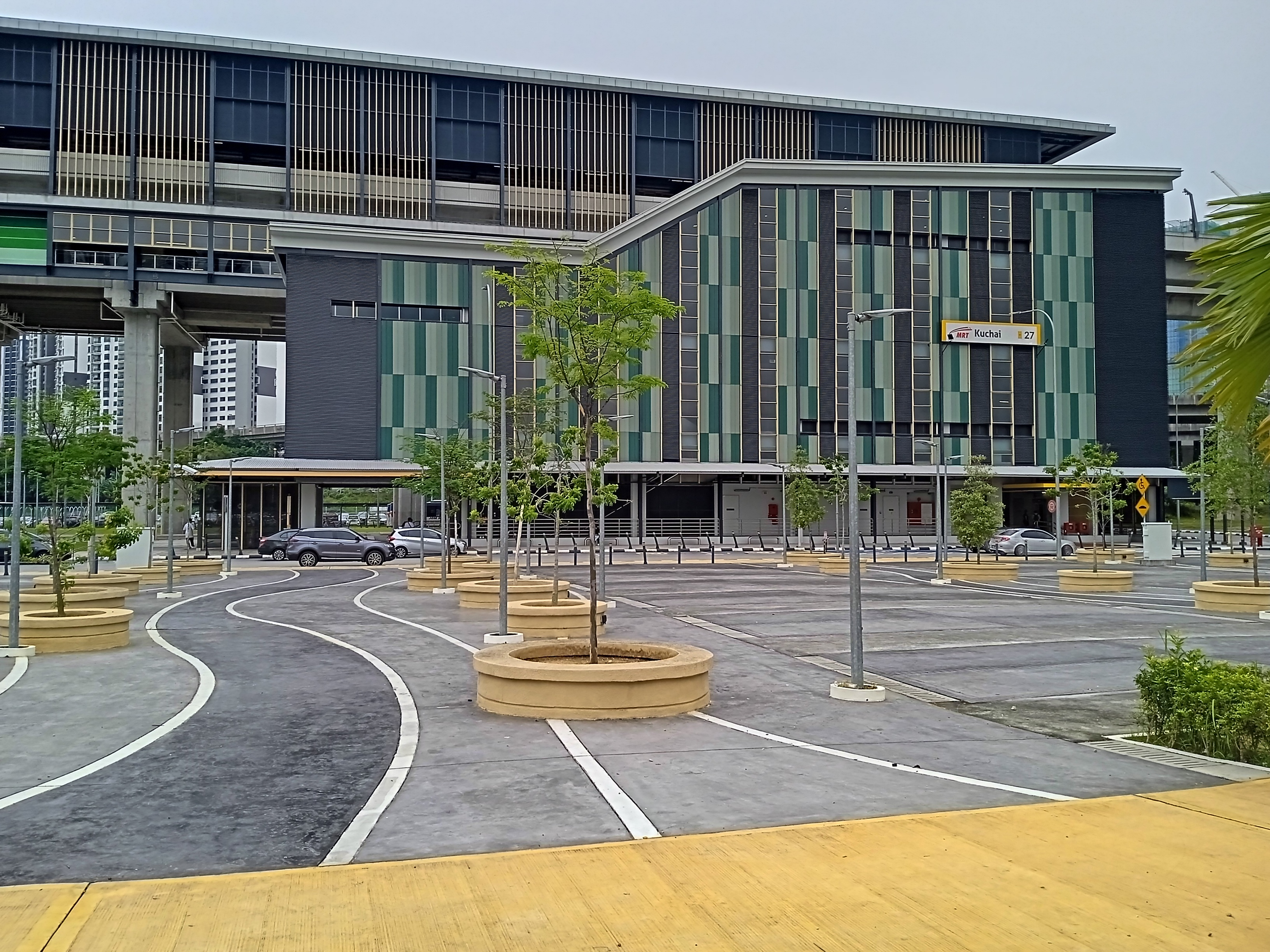
Kuchai MRT station, 2024

Kuchai MRT station on the Putrajaya Line.

==== Bus ====
rapidKL buses T582, T583, T586
