= Maju Expressway =

Road in Malaysia

Expressway 20
- Maju Expressway (Kuala Lumpur–Putrajaya Expressway) (KL–KLIA Dedicated Expressway)

Route information
- Maintained by Maju Expressway Sdn Bhd
- Length: 26 km (16 mi)
- Existed: 2004–present
- History: Completed on 5 December 2007

Major junctions
- North end: Kuala Lumpur; Kampung Pandan Interchange
- Kuala Lumpur Middle Ring Road 1 East–West Link Expressway; Kuala Lumpur–Seremban Expressway; New Pantai Expressway; Shah Alam Expressway; FT 3215 Jalan Seri Kembangan; Putrajaya Link
- South end: Cyberjaya; Putrajaya Interchange

Location
- Country: Malaysia
- Primary destinations: Kuala Lumpur, Salak South, Sri Petaling, Bukit Jalil, Putrajaya, Cyberjaya

Highway system
- Highways in Malaysia; Expressways; Federal; State

The E20 Maju Expressway (MEX) (formerly known as Kuala Lumpur–Putrajaya Expressway (KLPE) and KL–KLIA Dedicated Expressway) (Malay: Lebuhraya Kuala Lumpur-Putrajaya) is an expressway network in Klang Valley, Malaysia. The 26 km (16 mi)-long expressway links the Kuala Lumpur City Centre with the Kuala Lumpur International Airport (KLIA) in Sepang, Selangor. The expressway is a backbone of the Multimedia Super Corridor (MSC) area.

The Kilometre Zero is located at Kampung Pandan Interchange, Kuala Lumpur, just outside the Tun Razak Exchange.

== History ==
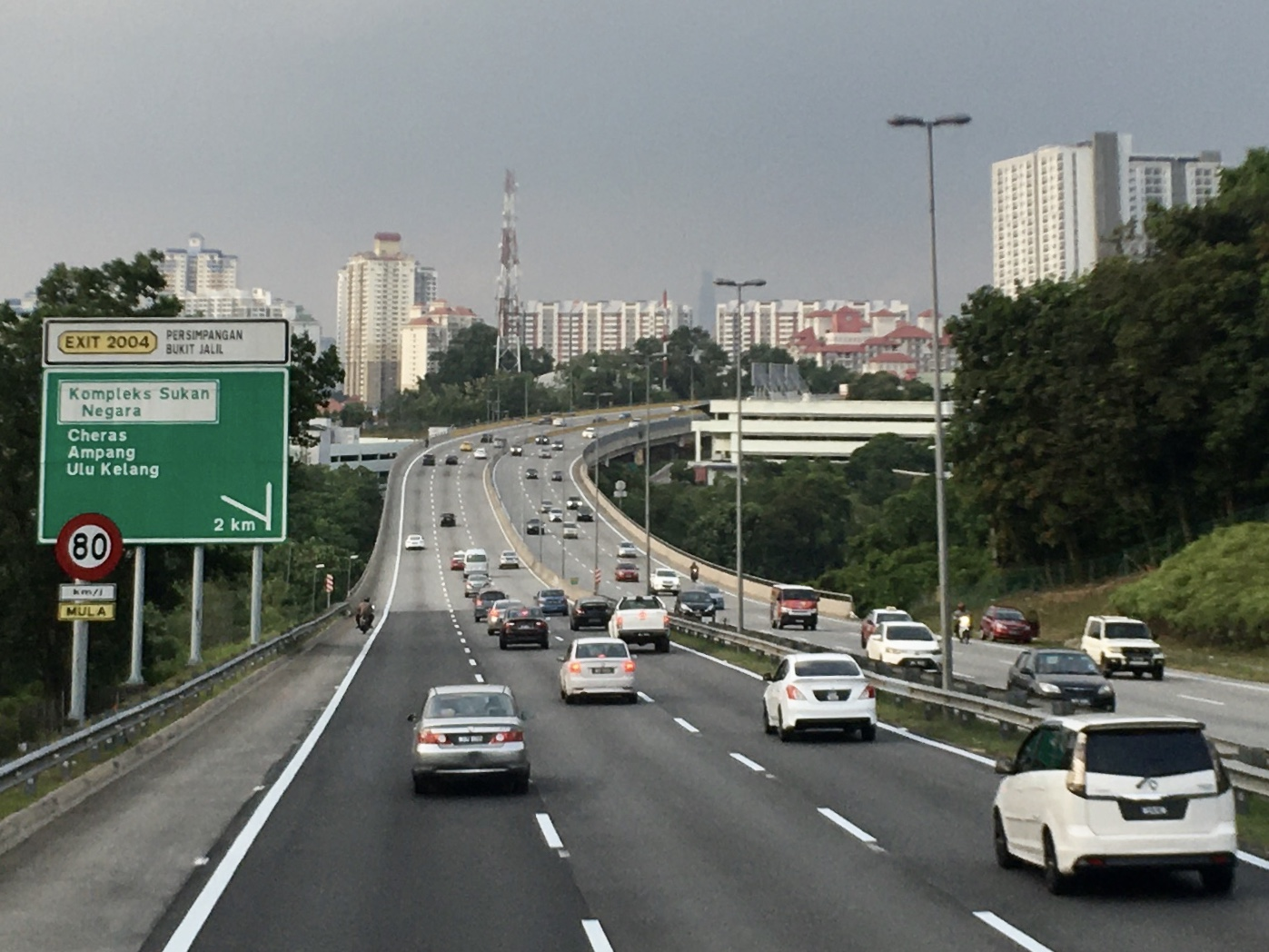
Heading to Bukit Jalil Interchange

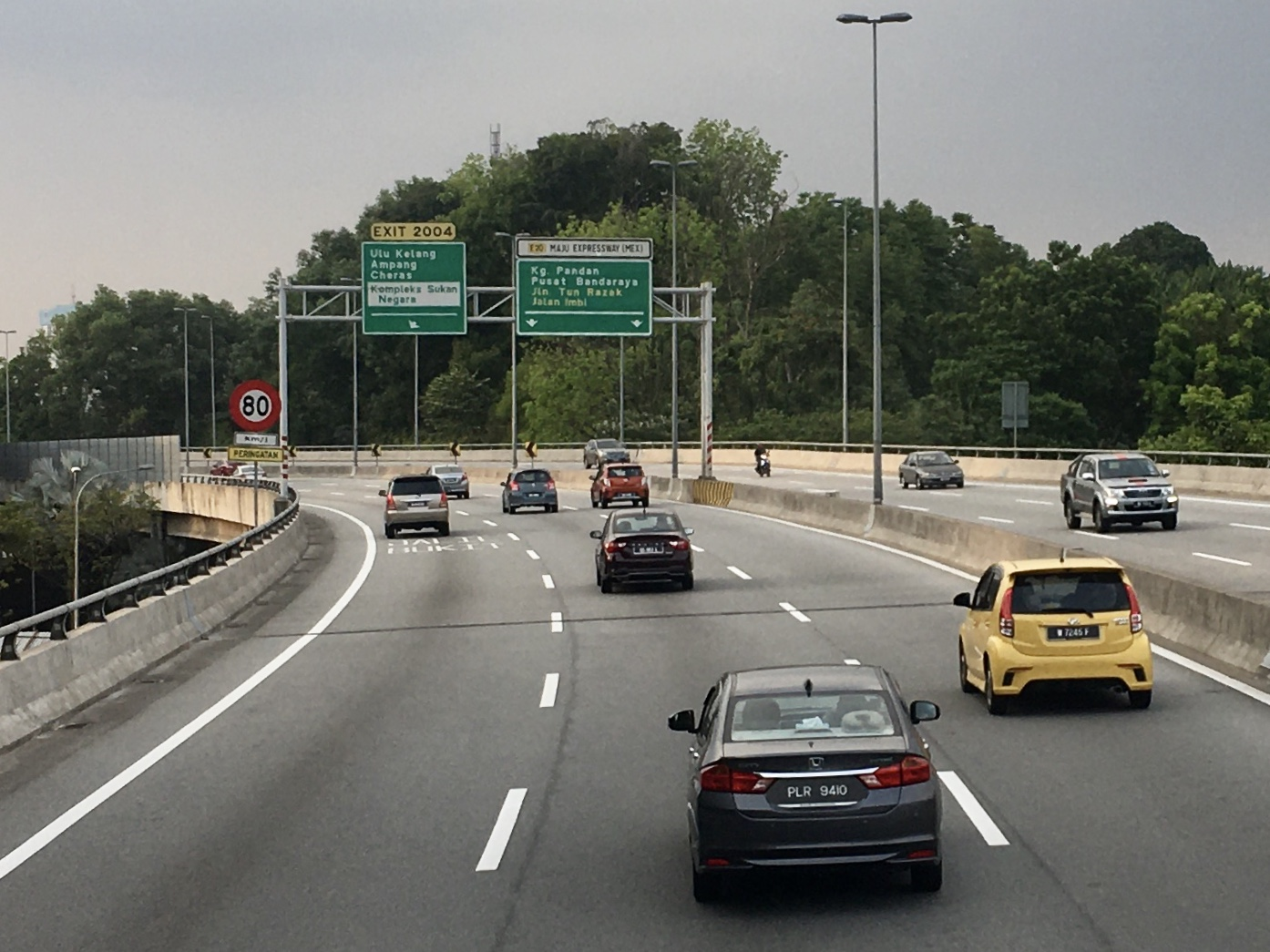
Heading to Bukit Jalil Interchange

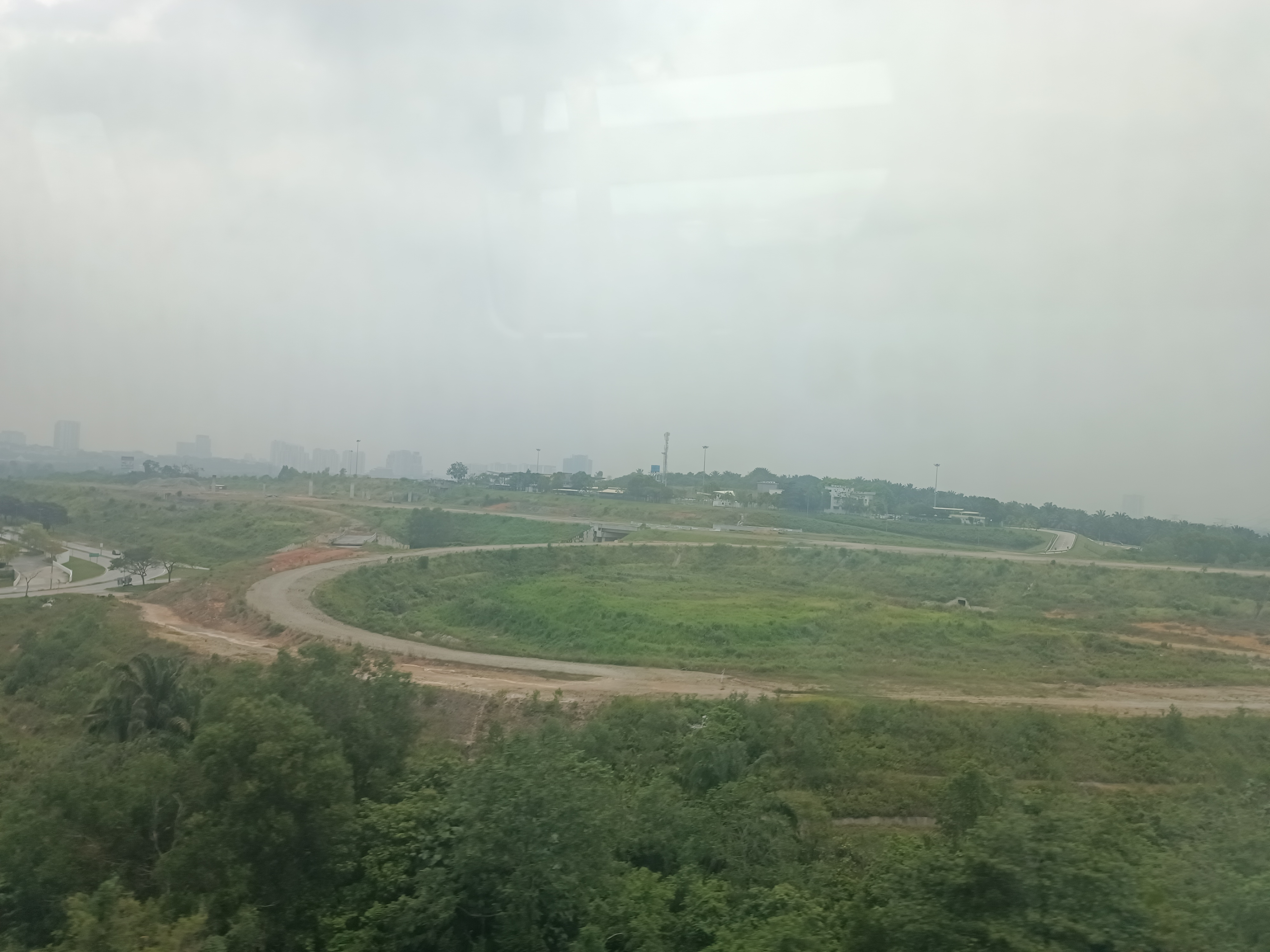
Abandoned Maju Expressway near Cyberjaya

Construction of Maju Expressway started on 6 December 2004 and completed on 5 December 2007. It was open to motorists on 13 December 2007. This expressway provided fast and convenient connectivity between Kuala Lumpur, the capital of Malaysia and Putrajaya – the new Malaysian Government Administrative Centre, Cyberjaya – the core of the Multimedia Super Corridor (MSC) and KLIA.

MEX is operated by Maju Expressway Sdn Bhd (MESB), the concessionaire that has been awarded a 33-year concession to operate the dual carriageway.

Extending 26 km in its first phase, MEX is designated as the Protocol Expressway that links Putrajaya, Cyberjaya, KLIA and LCCT with Kuala Lumpur. MEX reduce traveling time between Putrajaya to Kuala Lumpur from about 60 minutes to 30 minutes, or half the previous travelling time with five interchanges: Kampung Pandan, Salak South, Kuchai Lama, Bukit Jalil and Putrajaya Utama (Putrajaya Main).

Seri Kembangan interchange (Exit 2004A) began operations at 13 January 2016, providing access from MEX to Seri Kembangan (formerly Serdang), Puchong and Universiti Putra Malaysia (UPM).

Maju Expressway was planned to extend to KLIA by Dec 2019 and the route will be 18 km-long, three-lane dual carriageway and commence at Putrajaya Main Interchange. The extension was 89% completed as of March 2023. However, due to cashflow issues, the concessionaire is not able to complete the construction of the highway. Later, the Malaysian Anti-Corruption Commission is investigating the alleged RM360 million in false claims related to the funding of the highway project.

== Controversial issues ==
=== Noise and cracks at Sri Petaling ===
The development stage of the Kuala Lumpur-Putrajaya Expressway created a controversy due to the effects of the construction to the houses of the residents in Sri Petaling. There were several cracks reported to some houses, fueling protests among the Sri Petaling residents against the construction of the expressway.

According to the residents, the expressway was reported to be built too near to residential houses, which was claimed by Sri Petaling residents as violating the expressway construction standards. The expressway which was built too near to the residential areas (only 2 m from residential houses) also causes concerns about noise pollution as well as safety issues that would be caused by the expressway.

=== Last-minute motorcycle ban on the expressway ===
On 31 January 2008, Datuk Seri S. Samy Vellu officially banned all motorcycles from using the Kuala Lumpur-Putrajaya Expressway, which was said due to "safety reasons" due to the so-called "limited space" on the expressway. Ironically, the double-decked Kerinchi Link of the Sprint Expressway which was almost similar in terms of design (except for the double-deck design) is allowed to be used by all motorcyclists. Originally, motorcyclists were used to be allowed on the expressway and both Putrajaya and Salak toll plazas included motorcycle lanes.

Several weeks before the official ban, there were some reported cases of motorcyclists being chased away from the expressway by the concessionaire staff. The last-minute ban fueled anger among motorcyclists especially in Kuala Lumpur and Putrajaya and viewed as a discrimination against Malaysian motorcyclists. Even with motorcycle ban, there are less drivers travelling on this expressway.

On 6 June 2008, the motorcycle ban was lifted by the new Minister of Works, Datuk Ir. Mohd Zin Mohamed as an effort to encourage people to use motorcycles as a more fuel-economic alternative to cars. The decision was made as a result of the recent Malaysian fuel price hike where the price of RON97 petrol was increased from RM1.92 to RM2.70.

== Features ==
- The expressway provides Traffic Control and Surveillance System (TCSS) that comprises vehicle detectors and closed circuit television (CCTV) cameras.
- Emergency telephones and Variable Message Signs (VMS)
- MEX Ronda patrol ready to aid drivers who require assistance on the expressway.
- Entire Expressway is fully lit at night which contributes to driving comfort and safety.
- 90 km/h speed limit
- Many flyovers along the expressways including Tun Razak, Salak South and Sri Petaling–Bukit Jalil.
- Long straight sections between Bukit Jalil and Seri Kembangan.
- Views of Kuala Lumpur skyline from Salak South.

== Tolls ==
The Maju Expressway uses opened toll systems.

=== Electronic Toll Collections ===
As part of an initiative to facilitate faster transaction at the Salak South, Seri Kembangan and Putrajaya Toll Plaza, all toll transactions at three toll plazas on the Maju Expressway have been conducted electronically via Touch 'n Go cards or SmartTAGs since 13 January 2016. Contactless credit and debit cards using the MyDebit, Visa and Mastercard network are accepted for toll payments since 3 August 2023, marking the first Malaysian toll expressway to support contactless cards for toll payments.

=== Toll fares ===
| Class | Types of vehicles | Rate (in Malaysian Ringgit (RM)) | | |
| Class | Types of vehicles | Salak Selatan | Seri Kembangan | Putrajaya |
|---|---|---|---|---|
| 0 | Motorcycles (Vehicles with two axles and two wheels) | Free | | |
| 1 | Private Cars (Vehicles with two axles and three or four wheels (excluding taxis and buses)) | 2.00 | 2.20 | 3.50 |
| 2 | Vans and other small goods vehicles (Vehicles with two axles and five or six wheels (excluding buses)) | 4.00 | 4.40 | 7.00 |
| 3 | Large Trucks (Vehicles with three or more axles (excluding buses)) | 6.00 | 6.60 | 10.50 |
| 4 | Taxis | 1.00 | 1.10 | 1.80 |
| 5 | Buses | 1.50 | 2.20 | 2.50 |

== Junction list ==
| State/territory | District | Location | km | mi | Exit | Name | Destinations | Notes |
|---|---|---|---|---|---|---|---|---|
| Kuala Lumpur | Bukit Bintang | Bukit Bintang | 0.0 | 0.0 | 2001 | Kampung Pandan I/C | Kuala Lumpur Middle Ring Road 1 Jalan Tun Razak – KLCC, Jalan Ampang Kampung Pandan Roundabout; Jalan Davis – Jalan Sultan Ismail, Bukit Bintang, City Centre; Jalan Kampung Pandan – Kampung Pandan, Taman Maluri; Jalan Tun Razak – Cheras, Jalan Chan Sow Lin | Multi-level stacked interchange; entry & exit ramps at Jalan Tun Razak and Kampung Pandan Roundabout |
| Kuala Lumpur | Bukit Bintang | Bukit Bintang | | | Tun Razak Flyover | | | |
| Kuala Lumpur | Bukit Bintang | Bukit Bintang | | | Sungai Kerayong bridge | | | |
| Kuala Lumpur | Bukit Bintang | Salak South | | | Salak South Toll Plaza | | | |
| Kuala Lumpur | Bukit Bintang | Salak South | | | 2002 | Salak South I/C | | Entry ramps from E37 (to Putrajaya only) |
| Kuala Lumpur | Bukit Bintang | Kuchai Lama | | | 2003 | Kuchai Lama I/C | Kuala Lumpur–Seremban Expressway – Kuchai Lama, Petaling Jaya, Cheras | Entry & exit ramps at Jalan Kuchai Lama (to Putrajaya only) |
| Selangor | Petaling | Seri Kembangan | | | 2004 | Bukit Jalil I/C | Shah Alam Expressway – KL Sports City, Bukit Jalil, Sri Petaling, Cheras, Ampang, Kuantan | Entry & exit ramps at Shah Alam Expressway |
| Selangor | Petaling | Seri Kembangan | | | 2004A | Seri Kembangan I/C | FT 3215 Jalan Seri Kembangan – Seri Kembangan, Serdang, Puchong, Universiti Putra Malaysia | Trumpet interchange with toll plaza (KL-bound only; accepts TnG, TAG, MyRFiD) |
| Selangor | Petaling | Seri Kembangan | | | Seri Kembangan Rest Area (bothbound) – Parking, toilets, food court, surau, wakaf, public phone | | | |
| Selangor | Sepang | Cyberjaya | | | 2005 | Putrajaya Link I/C | Putrajaya Link – Shah Alam, Putra Heights, KLIA, Ipoh, Johor Bahru, Putrajaya, Cyberjaya, Dengkil, Salak Tinggi, Nilai | Trumpet interchange; access to Putrajaya/Cyberjaya and KLIA via NSECL/FT29 |
| Selangor | Sepang | Cyberjaya | | | Putrajaya North Toll Plaza | | | |
| Selangor | Sepang | Cyberjaya | | | 2006 | Cyberjaya I/C | Cyberjaya | Proposed |
| Selangor | Sepang | Dengkil | | | 2007 | Dengkil I/C | FT 31 Malaysia Federal Route 31 – Dengkil, Banting, Semenyih | Proposed |
| Selangor | Sepang | Dengkil | | | 2008 | KLIA Expressway I/C | North–South Expressway Central Link (KLIA Expressway) / FT 26 – Ipoh, Kuala Lumpur, Seremban, Johor Bahru, Kuala Lumpur International Airport (KLIA), Sepang, Bandar Enstek, Sepang International Circuit | Unfinished; southbound only |
1.000 mi = 1.609 km; 1.000 km = 0.621 mi: Electronic toll collection; Incomplete access; Proposed
