= Sungai Besi =

Suburb in Federal Territory of Kuala Lumpur

Coordinates: 3°03′N 101°42′E

Sungai Besi (formerly known as Sungei Besi; English: Steel River) is a town and suburb within the Federal Territory of Kuala Lumpur in Malaysia.

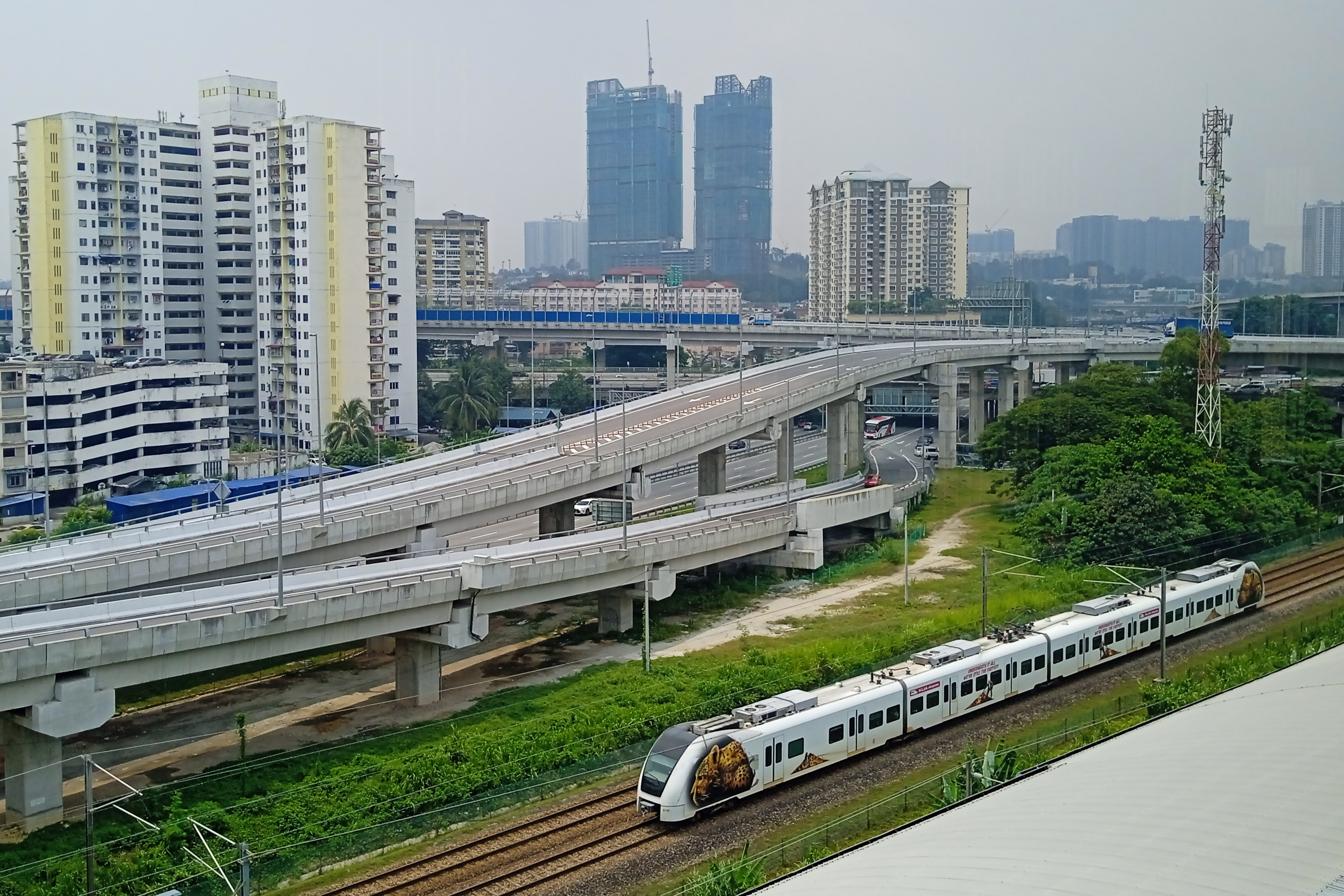
Aerial view of Sungai Besi town

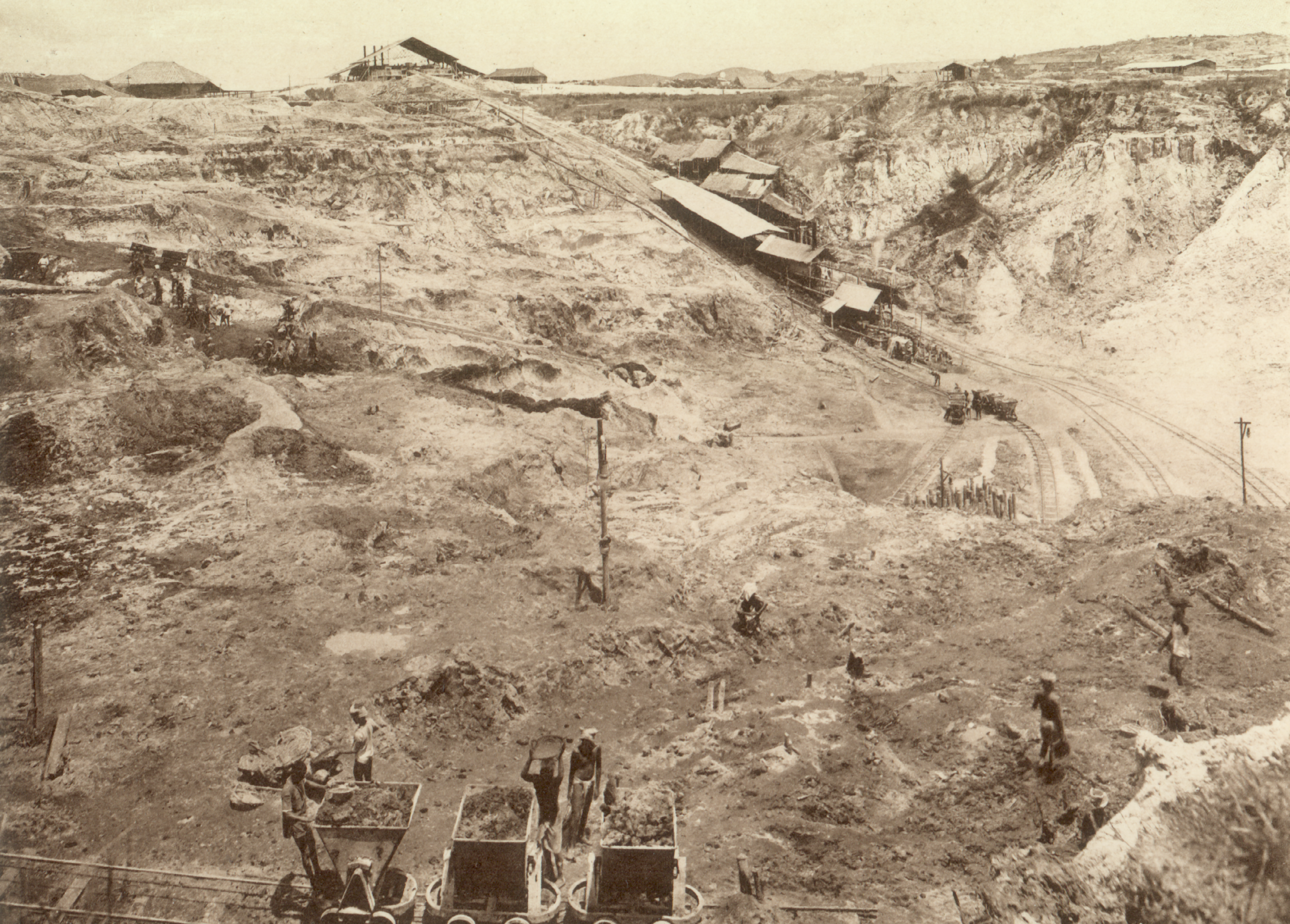
Tin mining in Sungai Besi circa 1910

The federal constituency of Sungai Besi existed from 1974 to 1995. Sungai Besi was a historical mining town with many heavy industries such as steelworks, waste steel plants and other steel industries. Sungei Besi Tin Mine site was the largest and deepest open cast alluvial tin mine in the world and in Malaysia. The town has since developed from a large area of village settlements.

== Background and progress ==
The town is still in its original settings. The village structures are from the early days of the town. Most of the buildings are built from wood and the pathways are narrow. There is also a modest century-old Chinese temple ( 仙四師爺廟(新街場) ) which is founded in 1901 inside the town area.

The area of Sungai Besi is located within the shops and the area near the police station. Sungai Besi has many street vendors and traders in wet markets who sell mostly food items and fruits.

The Sungei Besi Tin Mine site was once upon a time the largest and deepest open cast alluvial tin mine in the world, as deep as 100 metres in some parts of the pit and with dangerously unstable slopes. Today, the site has been developed and occupied by Mines Wellness City.

Sungai Besi is also known for the Sungai Besi Airport (Simpang Airport) which was once the main airport for Kuala Lumpur until 1965, where it got relocated to Subang International Airport. The airport then housed the RMAF Museum and the Sungai Besi Air Base. It was used by the Royal Malaysian Air Force as well as the Police, Fire and Rescue services for aviation purposes until it ceased operations in early 2018 to make way for the construction of MRT stations and Bandar Malaysia development project.

=== Sungai Besi refugee camp ===
A refugee camp for Vietnamese boat people was set up in Sungai Besi in 1982 as a transit camp. It was consisted of two camp sites, one of which the location was approximately where Astro Bukit Jalil is situated today.

In 1995, a demonstration by Vietnamese refugees occurred in the camp to protest against forced repatriation. Around 4,000 Vietnamese, equipped with makeshift knives and swords, escaped the camp and threatened to commit a mass suicide. In the end, at least 13 protestors were injured.

The camp was officially closed in on 25 June 1996 with the repatriation of 22 boat people to Hanoi, the last batch of refugees to leave Malaysia.

== Accessibility and transport ==
The township is easily accessible from the North–South Expressway Southern Route. The road into the township is only 400 metres from the Sungai Besi Expressway exit.

The main road in Sungai Besi is Jalan Suasa which is the main trading centre. Sometimes, it is packed with heavy vehicles and cars of many tourists who are in town to enjoy Sungai Besi's famed seafood.

The township is also served by the Sungai Besi station on the Sri Petaling LRT line and Putrajaya MRT line.
