= Kuen Cheng High School =

Independent Chinese secondary school in Kuala Lumpur, Malaysia

Kuen Cheng High School 坤成中學 坤成中学 kūn chéng zhōng xué Sekolah Menengah Kuen Cheng
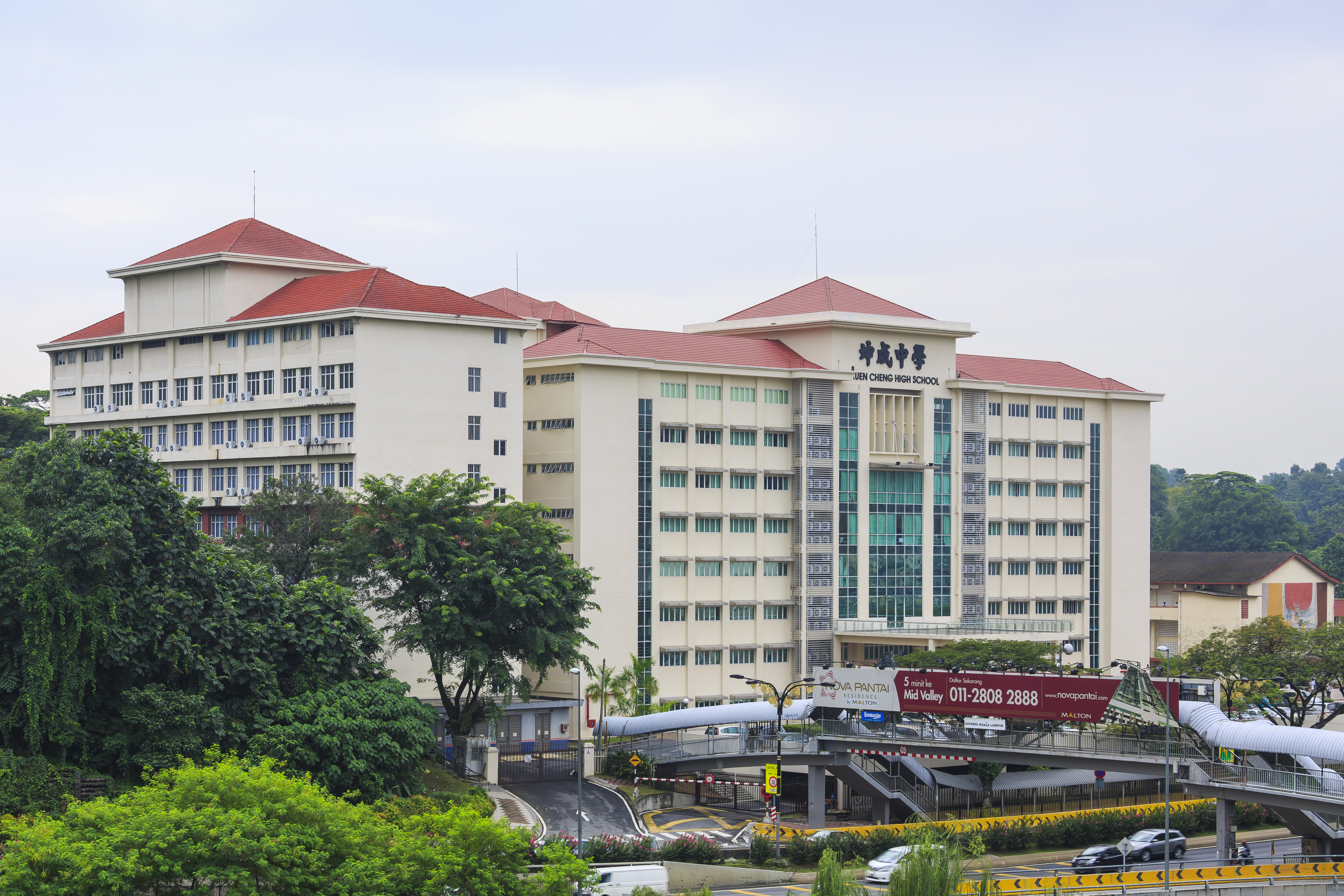

Location
- Jalan Syed Putra; Kuala Lumpur; 50460; Malaysia

Information
- School type: Private Independent Chinese Secondary School
- Motto: 礼、义、廉、耻 (Modesty, Justice, Honesty, Dignity)
- Founded: 1908
- Founder: Wu Xuehua, Zhong Zhuojing, Yoshiko Watanabe
- Director: Tan Sri William Cheng Heng Jem
- Principal: Chua Lee Lee
- Teaching staff: 360+
- Grades: 5/6
- Average class size: 50
- Education system: Unified Examination Certificate (UEC), Sijil Pelajaran Malaysia (SPM)
- Classes offered: Lower Secondary 1–3(Junior) Higher Secondary 1–3(Senior)
- Language: Mandarin, English, Malay
- Hours in school day: 8–10
- Classrooms: 100
- Area: 6.8 acres
- School fees: RM550 (Junior)/RM600 (Senior)

Kuen Cheng High School
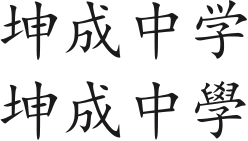
- Kuen Cheng High School in Simplified Chinese (top) and Traditional Chinese character (below)
- Traditional Chinese: 坤成中學
- Simplified Chinese: 坤成中学
Transcriptions
Standard Mandarin
- Hanyu Pinyin: Kūnchéng Zhōngxué

Kuen Cheng High School (KCHS) or SM (Persendirian) Kuen Cheng (Chinese: "坤成中学"), formerly known as Kuen Cheng Girls' High School (Chinese: "坤成女子中学"), is an independent semi-boarding secondary Chinese school in Kuala Lumpur, Malaysia which was established in 1908. The school is located at Jalan Syed Putra near The Royal Museum, and is situated between Brickfields and Bukit Petaling.

In 2008, the school transitioned from an all-girls school to a coeducational school. According to school history accounts, the transition faced strong resistance from the female student body at the time, who opposed admitting male students. After becoming coeducational, the school officially changed its name to Kuen Cheng High School. The school is notable for its low acceptance rate, and only primary school students with results above a certain grade threshold are accepted. It is one of the most prestigious high schools in Malaysia, with 67.58% of its students scoring 5As or above in the 2024 SPM examinations.

== Principals ==
Principals had complete authority over both the primary school and the secondary school until 1957, when these roles were split due to a government education development plan that might have been affected if the joint administration had continued. After 1957, each division (secondary school and primary school) has had separate administrative units. In 1990, Gooi Swee Gaik was appointed principal of the secondary school. She is the longest serving principal in the school's history (28 years). She retired in 2018, passing the reins to Chua Lee Lee, the school's former academic head and vice-principal.

== History ==
Kuen Cheng High School was founded in the year 1908, making it one of the oldest educational establishments in Malaysia.

Kuen Cheng High School was the first educational institution in Malaysia to offer formal education for females at a time when education to girls was considered irrelevant in Chinese traditional culture.

Based on the prevailing social neglect of women's education, the founders of Kuen Cheng Girls' High School, Wu Xuehua, principal Zhong Zhuo Jing, his wife, Yoshiko Watanabe, and Cheong Yoke Choy upheld female education and aimed to break the traditional concept. The school was given the name "Kuen Cheng Girls' School" and its first location was at Kampung Attap in a rented double-story shop lot. The school aimed to implement a hybrid teaching system, focusing on the Chinese Language, characters, arithmetic and more. There were a mere 18 students when the school first started.

In 1909, the school moved to Harmony Street and began to develop. In 1915, the school founded its own kindergarten, opening up opportunities in Chinese education for young children. In 1936, Kuen Cheng was commissioned by the Selangor Department of Education to be an excellent training institution for teachers, and nurtured many outstanding teachers, making great contributions to Chinese education. In 1941 during World War II, the Japanese army invaded the country, and the school was forced to close. In 1942, the school premises were used as a military base by Japanese forces. After the Japanese surrendered in 1945, the school and its kindergarten were reopened with the support of a group of enthusiastic educators. The school was officially functioning again in 1946. In 1956, the school moved to its current location at Lornie Road (Jalan Syed Putra). In 1957, there were 49 students in the first class of graduates. In 1962, Kuen Cheng strived to preserve Chinese education and decided to maintain its position as an independent Chinese school, and its status was officially changed to an "independent secondary school", not receiving any funding from the federal government.

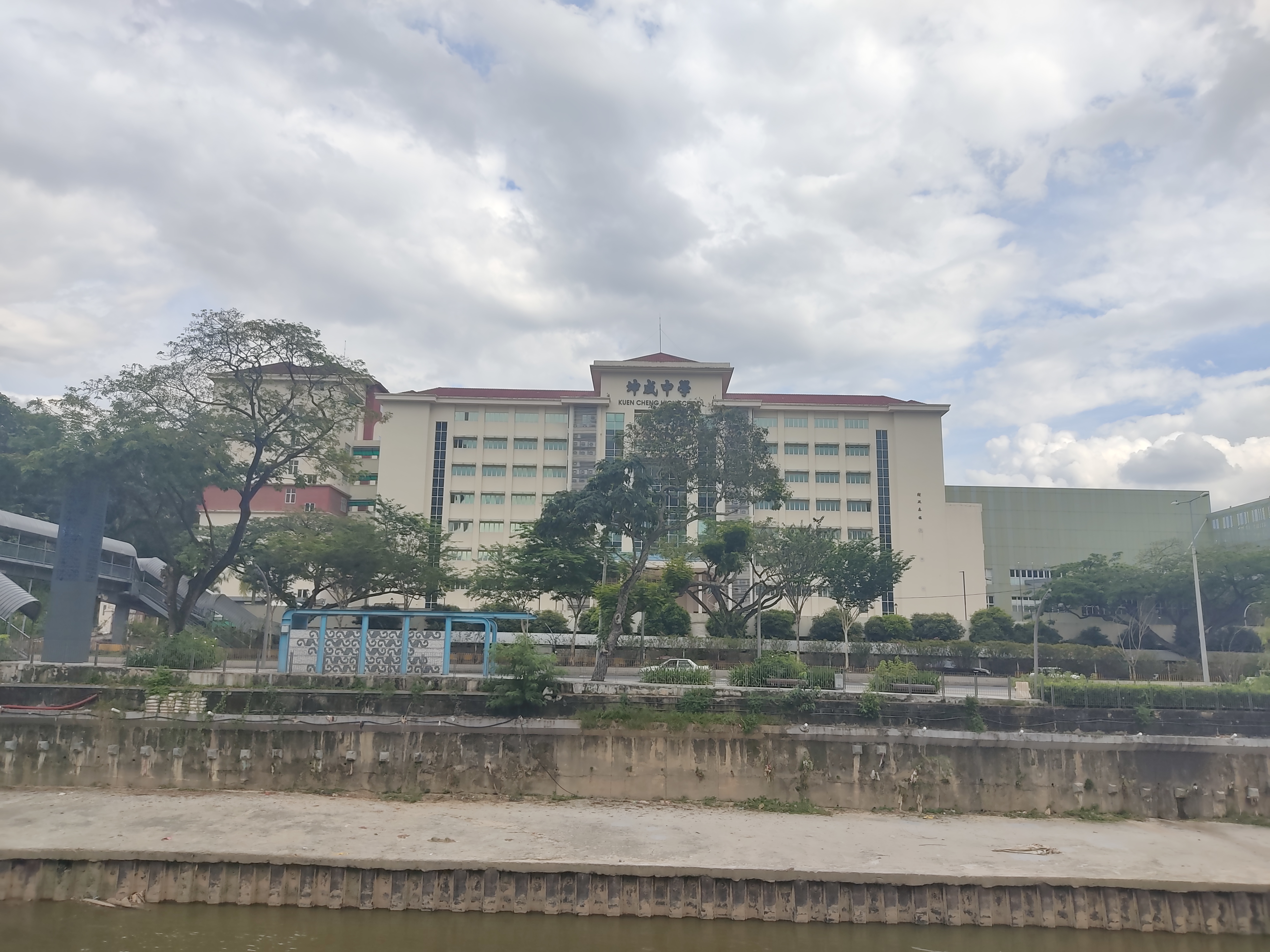
The front building (Block A) of the school facing Jalan Syed Putra

In 2008, the 100th year since the school foundation, Kuen Cheng decided to convert its enrollment from all girls to a co-educational system, in order to keep up with the culture of a modern society, where males and females are viewed equally and have equal rights. In the same year, the school received its first class of male students, despite resentments from some alumni. In 2013, Kuen Cheng High School's 57th year of Higher Secondary 3 (Senior) graduates became the first co-educational graduates of the school. In 2015, Kuen Cheng High School had been rated 5 stars as one of the Schools of Excellence in Malaysia by the Ministry of Education.

Presently, the restructuring of the school from an all-girls school to a co-educational system seems to have many benefits, as the student population soared to new heights, with the number of enrolled students this year exceeding 4,500 students. The school now has a 100% full enrollment and had many applicants rejected due to the high number of applications to the school.
