= Jalan Tun Sambanthan =

Road in Malaysia

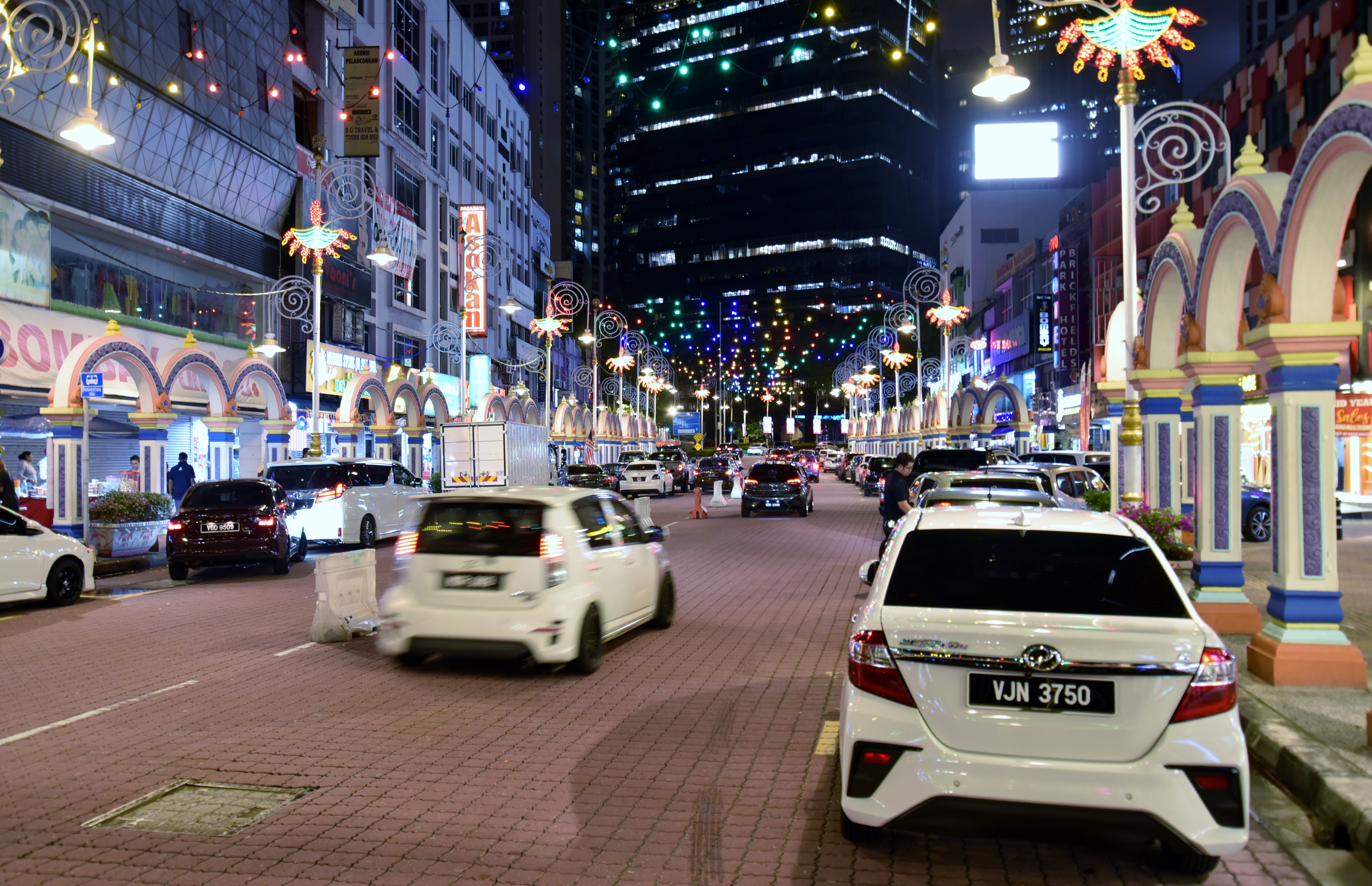
- Jalan Tun Sambanthan in 2023

Major junctions
- North end: Kuala Lumpur; Central Market
- Jalan Cheng Lock; Jalan Hang Kasturi; Kuala Lumpur Middle Ring Road 1 Jalan Rakyat (Jalan Travers); FT 2 Jalan Syed Putra
- South end: Brickfields south FT 2 Jalan Syed Putra

Location
- Country: Malaysia
- Primary destinations: Dayabumi; KL Sentral; Brickfields

Highway system
- Highways in Malaysia; Expressways; Federal; State

Jalan Tun Sambanthan (formerly Jalan Brickfields) is a major road in Kuala Lumpur, Malaysia. It was built in 1982 and named after Tun V.T. Sambanthan, a former Minister of Works and Communications and one of the founding fathers of Malaysia.

== Landmarks ==
Along Jalan Tun Sambanthan is the century-old Young Men's Christian Association (YMCA), which has become a landmark in Brickfields. Further down along Jalan Tun Sambanthan is the Vivekananda Ashram that was built in the early 19th century.

The road connects motorists to KL Sentral, Dayabumi and Jalan Bangsar.

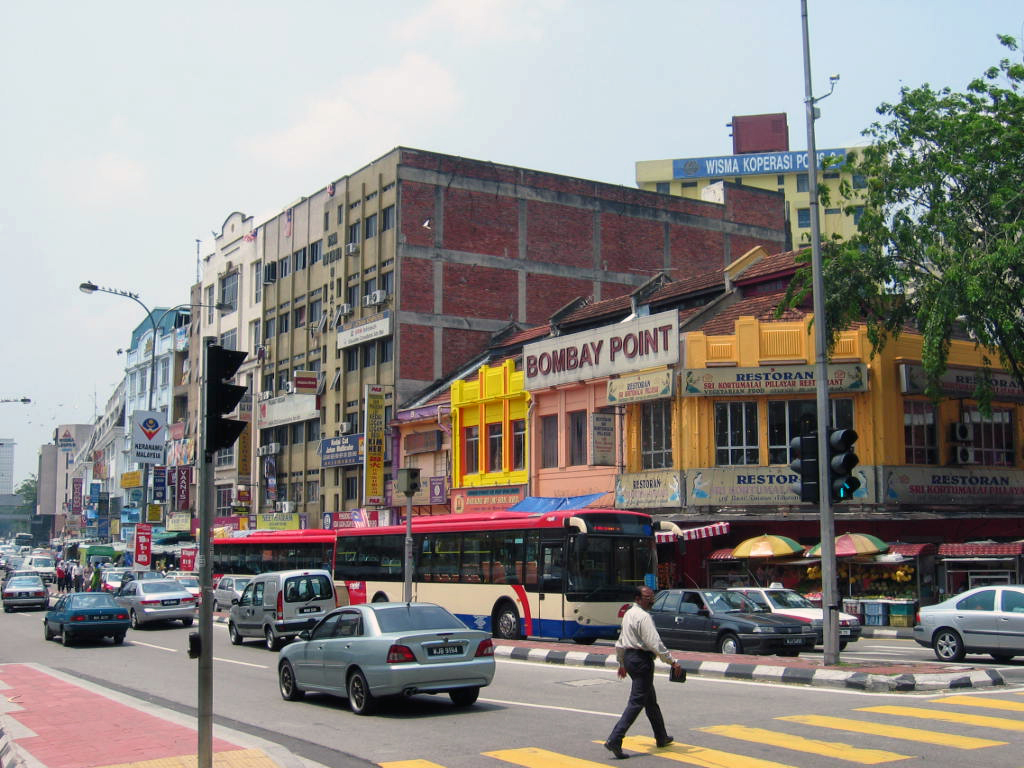
Jalan Tun Sambanthan at Brickfields, Kuala Lumpur.

== List of junctions ==
km	Exit	Junctions	To	Remarks
			North; Jalan Robson; Thean Hou Temple	
Jalan Robson
Jalan Tun Sambanthan (Jalan Brickfields)
		Brickfields south Jalan Syed Putra	FT 2 Jalan Syed Putra South Only; Cheras; Seremban; Jalan Klang Lama; Petaling Jaya; Shah Alam; Klang	Parcelo interchange
		Brickfields south Jalan Syed Putra	FT 2 Jalan Syed Putra Northwest Only; City centre	Parcelo interchange
		Jalan Sultan Abdul Samad	Northeast; Jalan Sultan Abdul Samad	T-junctions
		Brickfields	Northwest; Jalan Rakyat (Jalan Travers); Jalan Bangsar; Bangsar; Jalan Damansara (KLMRR1)	T-junctions
		KL Sentral	Northwest; Jalan Stesen Sentral; P&R KL Sentral; Arrival/Departure; TnG TAG Hub; ETS 1 2 5 6 7 9	T-junctions
		NU Sentral	NU Sentral	
		KL Sentral Monorail station	KL Sentral Monorail Station; 8	
		Jalan Sultan Abdul Samad	Southeast; Jalan Sultan Abdul Samad	T-junctions
		KLMRR1	Kuala Lumpur Middle Ring Road 1 East Only; Sungai Besi; Cheras; Seremban; Petaling Jaya; Shah Alam; Klang; Istana Negara	Half diamond interchange
		Jalan Sultan Sulaiman	Jalan Sultan Sulaiman (Sulaiman Road) West; Jalan Sultan Hishamuddin; Jalan Bangsar East; FT 2 Jalan Syed Putra; FT 1 Jalan Kinabalu (KLIRR)	Diamond interchange
		P&R Kuala Lumpur Railway Station	P&R Kuala Lumpur Railway Station ETS 1 2 5 9	North bound
		Dayabumi	Dayabumi	Interchange
		Sungai Klang bridge		
		Kuala Lumpur; Central Market	Jalan Hang Kasturi (Rodger Road)	Jalan Hang Kasturi (No Entry); T-junctions
Jalan Tun Sambanthan (Jalan Brickfields)
Jalan Tun Tan Cheng Lock (Foch Avenue)
			East; Jalan Tun Tan Cheng Lock (Foch Avenue); Petaling Street; Jalan Tun Perak; Jalan Pudu	
