= Chan Wing =

Chinese businessman in colonial Malaya

Chan Wing (1873–1947) was a Chinese businessman in colonial Malaya. His home later became the first generation National Palace of Malaysia.

== Early life ==
Chan arrived in Malaya at the age of 14 with his brother, Loong. They worked at a tin mine in Sungai Besi in southern Kuala Lumpur, but Loong was unable to cope with the harsh working conditions and returned home after a year. Chan Wing continued to work many jobs, including as a shopkeeper for two of Loke Yew's shops in Sungai Besi.

At the age of 24, he formed a syndicate with four of his clansmen, including Cheong Yoke Choy, to investigate tin ore next to Loke Yew's Sungai Besi mine. The syndicate, Hong Fatt Tin Mine, became the largest open cast tin mine in the world and made Chan a millionaire. It is today the site of The Mines Resort City.

Chan also ventured into rice and rubber, and with fellow towkays, including Cheong Yoke Choy founded Kwong Yik Bank in 1913. He chose to live permanently in Malaya, and as an act of defiance against the Manchu government he cut off his queue.

== Residence ==
In the 1920s Chan Wing built a mansion at Petaling Hill in western Kuala Lumpur for his family of 10 wives and 26 children. Designed by the architecture firm Swan & McLaren, it was completed in 1929 and came to known as The Big House. It was perhaps the biggest house in town at that time. Chan Wing's family was able to flee the country during the Japanese occupation in 1942 and the mansion was made the residence of the Japanese Governor. After the war, it was commandeered by the British.

In 1950, it was rented to the Selangor state government as a second palace for the Sultan of Selangor. Upon Malayan independence in 1957, the mansion was sold to the Malayan government and became the Istana Negara, functioning as such until 2012.
