= Jalan Syed Putra =

Highway in Kuala Lumpur, Malaysia

Federal Route 2
- Jalan Syed Putra
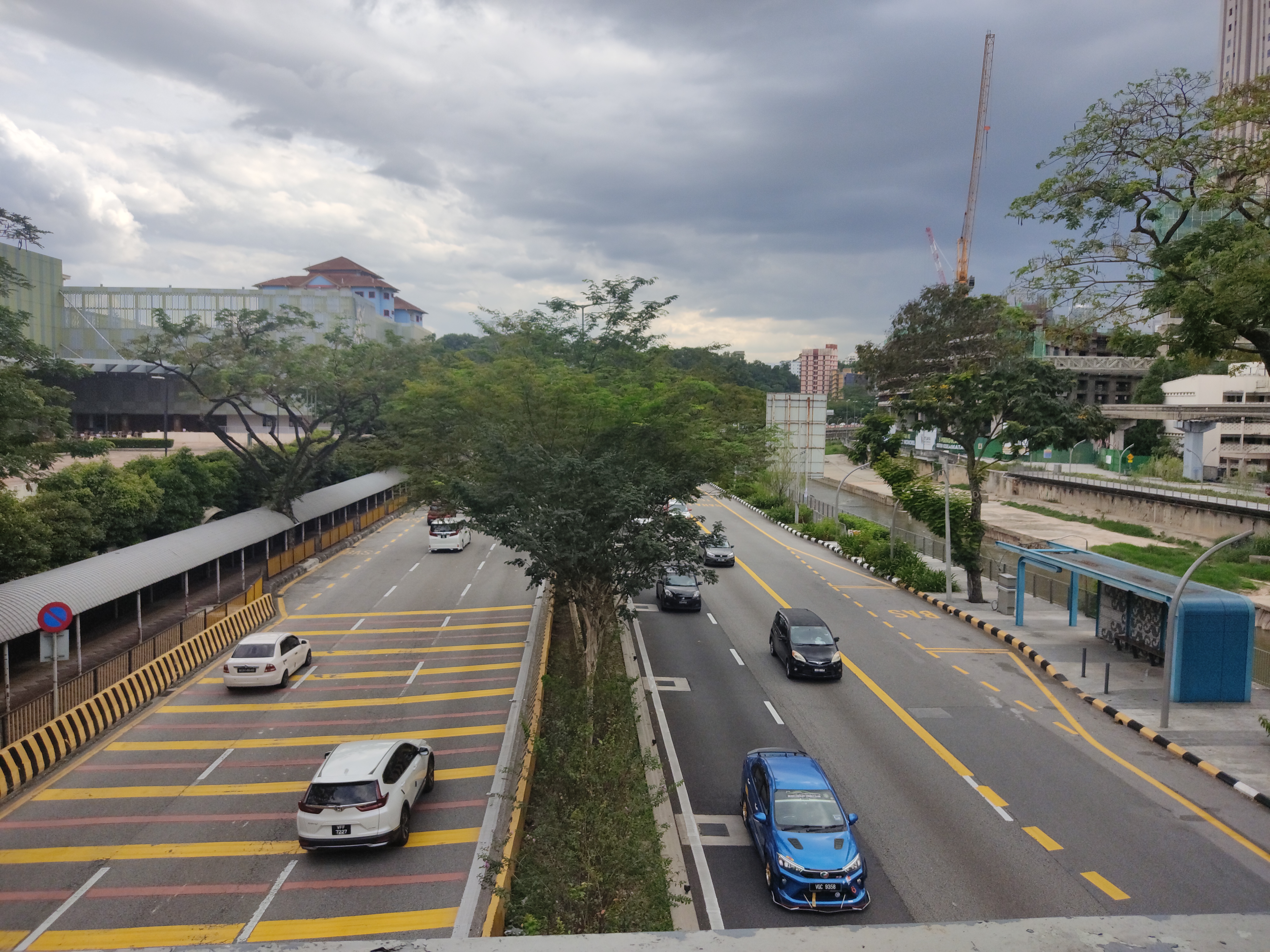
- Jalan Syed Putra

Route information
- Maintained by Malaysian Public Works Department
- Existed: 1905–present
- History: Completed in 1908

Major junctions
- North end: Kuala Lumpur; Kinabalu Roundabout
- FT 1 Kuala Lumpur Inner Ring Road; Kuala Lumpur Middle Ring Road 1 Jalan Tun Sambanthan; FT 2 Federal Highway; East–West Link Expressway; FT 2 Jalan Klang Lama
- South end: Seputeh

Location
- Country: Malaysia
- Primary destinations: Brickfields, Petaling Jaya, Shah Alam, Klang

Highway system
- Highways in Malaysia; Expressways; Federal; State

Jalan Syed Putra (formerly Lornie Drive), Federal Route 2 is a major highway in Kuala Lumpur, Malaysia. It was named after Almarhum Tuanku Syed Putra ibni Almarhum Syed Hassan Jamalullail of Perlis, the third Yang di-Pertuan Agong, which used to reside at Istana Negara which lies at one end of the highway.

Jalan Syed Putra was known as Lornie Drive during the British administration. It was named after James Lornie, one of the British Residents of Selangor in the 1920s. Lornie was also the president of the Royal Selangor Golf Club in 1926.

== Landmarks ==
At the eastern end of the highway is Wisma Tun Sambanthan, which stands tall over the rest of the structures in the area. Surrounding the building are small banks and offices including the Darul Takaful Finance Area (formerly the UMBC Bank building), the former Sime Darby Securities office, and the Kuala Lumpur and Selangor Chinese Assembly Hall (KLSCAH).

Kuen Cheng High School, one of the country's Chinese independent high schools, sits next to the former Istana Negara, which is located in between Jalan Syed Putra and Jalan Istana. There are two Chinese temples along the road including the Yuen Tong Chee, and the road leading up to the Thean Hou Temple.

Further down the highway sits the KEMAS training centre that is facilitated by the Rural and Regional Development Ministry. The headquarters of the Selangor and Federal Territory Family Planning Association and the Malaysian International Youth Home are also along the road.

The Mid Valley Megamall sits at the western end of the highway, just before the intersection to Jalan Klang Lama and the E10 New Pantai Expressway.

== Infrastructure ==
Along the highway runs Klang River, which has now been paved to support heavy monsoon rain and modern development.

Jalan Syed Putra is now connected to Jalan Tun Sambanthan through different roads while before it was only connected through a bridge across the Klang River.

== Junction lists ==
The entire route is located in Kuala Lumpur.

Legend:

- I/C - Interchange, I/S - Intersection, RSA - Rest and service area, OBR - Overhead bridge restaurant, R/R - Restaurant and rest plaza, L/B - Layby, V/P - Vista point, TN - tunnel, T/P - Toll plaza, BR - Bridge
- C - Cloverleaf, S - Stack, T-A - Trumpet-A, T-B - Trumpet-B, DT - Directional-T/Y, SDT - Semi-Directional-T/Y, P-Y - Partial-Y, D - Diamond, P-C - Partial cloverleaf, D-D - Diverging diamond, D-R - Direct ramp

Location	km	mi	Exit	Name	Destinations	Notes
Kuala Lumpur			Through to FT 2 Jalan Klang Lama			
Kuala Lumpur			231	Seputeh I/C	East–West Link Expressway – Cheras, Kajang, Kuala Lumpur International Airport (KLIA), Seremban, Malacca, Johor Bahru; FT 2 Federal Highway – Bangsar, Petaling Jaya, Shah Alam, Klang; New Pantai Expressway – Bandar Sunway, Subang Jaya	Stacked interchange
Kuala Lumpur			Railway crossing bridge			
Kuala Lumpur				Volvo I/C	Jalan 1/86 – Lingkaran Syed Putra, Seputeh; Mid Valley City – Mid Valley Megamall, Zone A, B, C, D, E and F, Volvo, Mid Valley Komuter station KTM Komuter	Interchange
Kuala Lumpur				Brickfields South I/C	Jalan Tun Sambanthan (Jalan Brickfields) – Brickfields, KL Sentral P&R , Bangsar, Seputeh; Jalan Robson – Thean Hou Temple	Parcelo interchange
Kuala Lumpur			Rebana Gateway Arch			
Kuala Lumpur				Jalan Robson Exit	Jalan Robson – Thean Hou Temple	Ramp off from Kuala Lumpur
Kuala Lumpur				U-Turn	U-Turn	
Kuala Lumpur				Kuen Cheng High School	Kuen Cheng High School	
Kuala Lumpur				Istana Negara, Jalan Istana	Kuala Lumpur Middle Ring Road 1 – Ipoh, Kuantan, KL Sentral P&R , National Museum, Parliament House, National Monument, Sungai Besi, Seremban, Istana Negara (Muzium Diraja)	Interchange
Kuala Lumpur				Jalan Sultan Sulaiman I/S	Jalan Sultan Sulaiman (Sulaiman Road) – Jalan Tun Sambanthan (Brickfields Road), Brickfields, Kuala Lumpur old railway station P&R , National Mosque, Stadium Merdeka, Stadium Negara, Cheras, Seremban	Junctions
Kuala Lumpur				Kuala Lumpur; Kinabalu Roundabout	Jalan Sultan Mohammad – Jalan Hang Kasturi (Cecil Street), Jalan Tun Tan Cheng Lock (Foch Avenue), Central Market; FT 1 Kuala Lumpur Inner Ring Road (Jalan Kinabalu (River Road)) – Ipoh, Jalan Raja, Jalan Raja Laut, Stadium Merdeka, Stadium Negara, Cheras, Seremban	Roundabout
1.000 mi = 1.609 km; 1.000 km = 0.621 mi: Incomplete access
