= Istana Negara, Jalan Istana =

Former residence of the King of Malaysia in Kuala Lumpur

Royal Museum
- Muzium Diraja; Istana Negara Lama
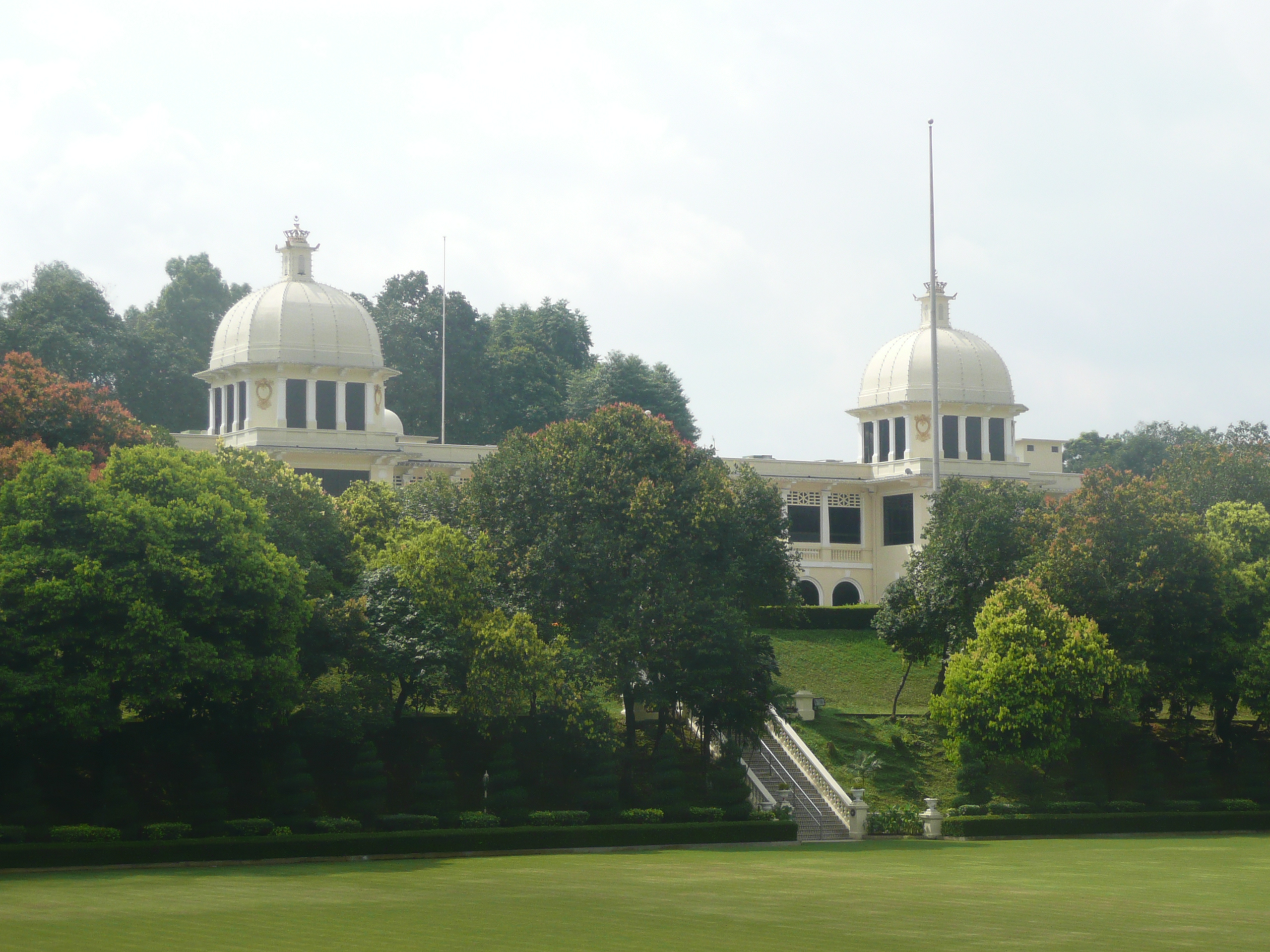

- Location within Kuala Lumpur Location within Malaysia
- Established: 2013
- Coordinates: 3.132487°N 101.695703°E
- Website: www.jmm.gov.my/en/museum/royal-museum
- Building details
- Former names: The Big House; Istana Negara

General information
- Status: Completed
- Architectural style: Palladian architecture
- Location: Jalan Istana, Kuala Lumpur, Malaysia
- Current tenants: Royal Museum
- Groundbreaking: 1928
- Construction started: 1928
- Completed: 1931
- Inaugurated: 1957
- Renovated: 1980

The Royal Museum (Malay: Muzium Diraja) along Jalan Istana was the former National Palace (Istana Negara) and former residence of the Yang di-Pertuan Agong (Supreme King) of Malaysia. It stands on a 13-acre (50,000 m^{2}) site, located on a commanding position on the slope of a hill of Bukit Petaling overlooking the Klang River, along Jalan Syed Putra.

It was replaced by the new national palace as the official residence of the king in 2011. In 2013, it was converted into the Royal Museum and referred as Old Istana Negara.

== History ==
The palace was originally a double-storey mansion called The Big House built in 1928 by a local Chinese millionaire, Chan Wing. During the Japanese occupation from 1942 to 1945, it was used as the residence of the Japanese Governor. After the surrender of the Japanese on 15 August 1945, the British Military Administration (BMA) commandeered it for a senior military officers mess from the rank of brigadier. With the formation of the Federation of Malaya in 1950, the Selangor State Government rented the residence from the owners for 5000 Malayan dollars monthly and renovated it to become the palace of the Sultan of Selangor until Malaya gained independence in 1957. In 1957, the owners sold the property of 13 acres to the Federal Government at an agreed valuation of 1.4 million Malayan dollars. The Federal Government then converted the residence into the Istana Negara (National Palace) for the newly created sovereign post of Yang di-Pertuan Agong (King) of Malaya which was scheduled for independence on 31 August 1957 as scheduled. Since then it has undergone several renovations and extensions. But the most extensive upgrading was carried out in 1980, as it was the first time that the installation ceremony of the Yang di-Pertuan Agong was held at the Istana Negara. Prior to this the Installation Ceremonies were held at the Tunku Abdul Rahman Hall in Jalan Ampang, Kuala Lumpur with the first one held in 1957.

After the Istana Negara was moved to the new palace on Jalan Duta in December 2011, it was later used for a royal exhibition called Raja Kita, in conjunction with the installation of Tuanku Abdul Halim Mu'adzam Shah as the 14th Yang di-Pertuan Agong in 2012. The exhibition started on 15 April 2012 and was later extended to 8 December 2012. Over 314,757 visitors, both local and foreign visited the exhibition between 15 April and 7 December.

It was decided that starting in 2013, two guards in Malay traditional attire would be stationed at the main gateway of the old Istana Negara to revive the nostalgia and tradition of the Malay Sultanate. Information, Communications and Culture Minister Rais Yatim said the practice will help retain the old palace as a must-visit tourist destination. Several rooms and halls at the old Istana Negara will be open to visitors to learn of their use to the previous thirteen Kings who lived in this old royal palace. An inventory will be drawn up of the collections in the palace in the effort to conserve them. Rais Yatim requested the Royal Malaysia Police and the Department of Museums to collaborate in managing the collections.

== Palace areas and use ==
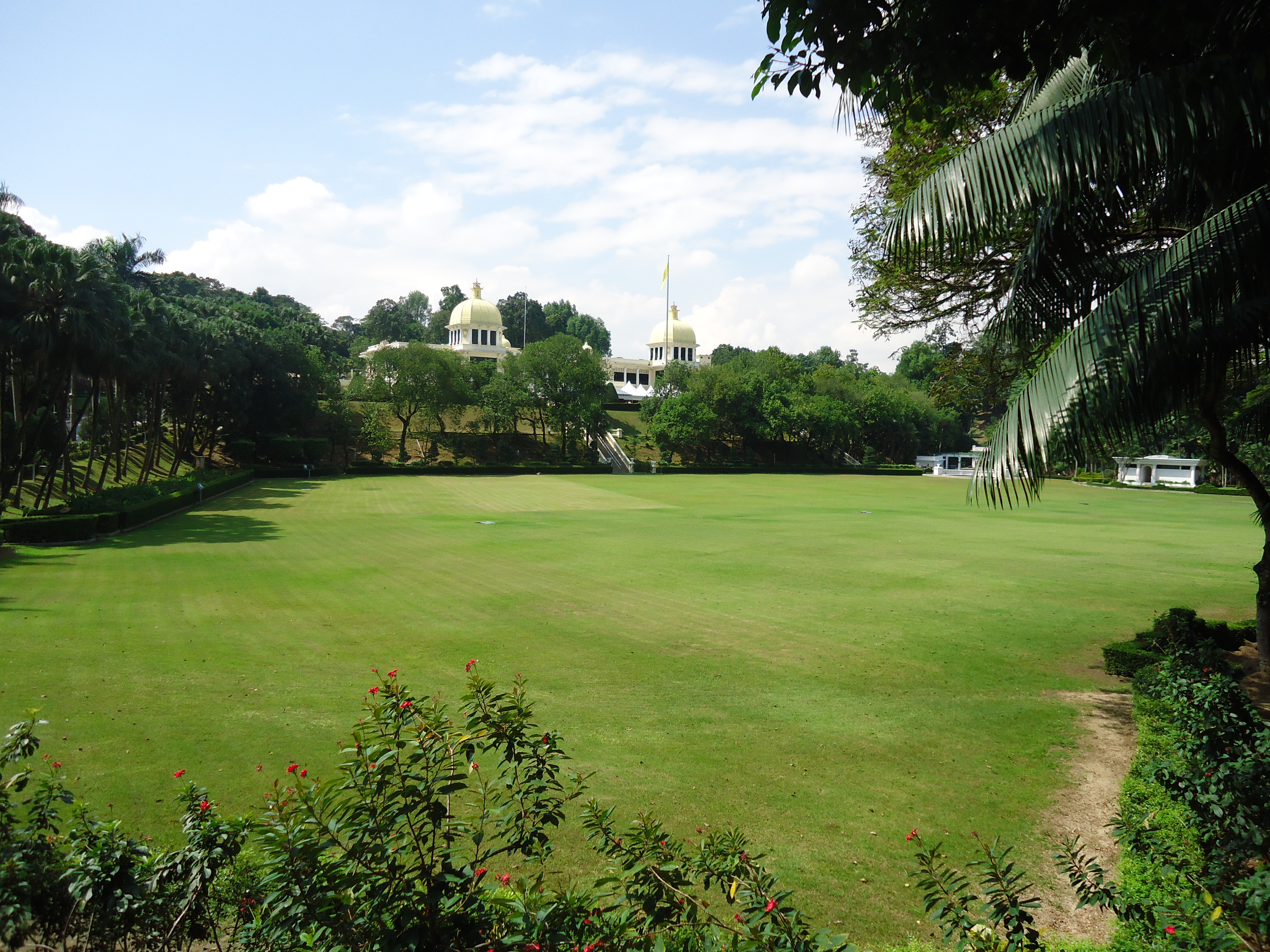
The compound of the old Istana Negara, at Jalan Istana, official residence of the Yang di-Pertuan Agong from 1957 to 2011. Since 2011, it moved to the larger Istana Negara at Jalan Duta.

=== Compound ===
The building is nestled within an 11.34-hectare compound with a variety of plants and flowers, swimming pool and indoor badminton hall. As the palace grounds are not opened to members of the public or tourists, the Main Palace Entrance is a favourite picture spot for tourists.

The whole area is fenced up and the Royal Insignia of the Monarch is placed on each steel bar between two pillars of the fence. At the front of the Istana Negara, there is the main entrance which resembles an arch. On each side of the arch, are two guard posts to shelter two members of the cavalry in their full dress uniform similar to the ones at Buckingham Palace, London. From 2013 onwards, the full dress uniform will be in Malay traditional attire as it was during the Malay Sultanate era.

In the grounds of the palace is a guard house for the members of the Royal Malay Regiment, one of the two Household Division units in the Malaysian Armed Forces (the other one is the Malaysian Royal Armoured Corps Mounted Ceremonial Squadron). There is also a six-hole golf course, tennis courts and a lake in the far end of the grounds.

The driveway, lined with cypresses and casuarinas, leads to two entrances – an entrance to the West Wing and the other to the East Wing.

=== East Wing ===
The Balai Rong Seri or throne room is located in the East Wing and was used only for official and customary functions. These include ceremonial occasions of taking the royal pledge, the installation rite, and the appointment of a new prime minister and the federal government which included investiture ceremonies and the taking of oaths by the government ministers and state governors. This is also where the presentation and acceptance of foreign diplomatic appointments are held. It sometimes serves as a banquet hall.

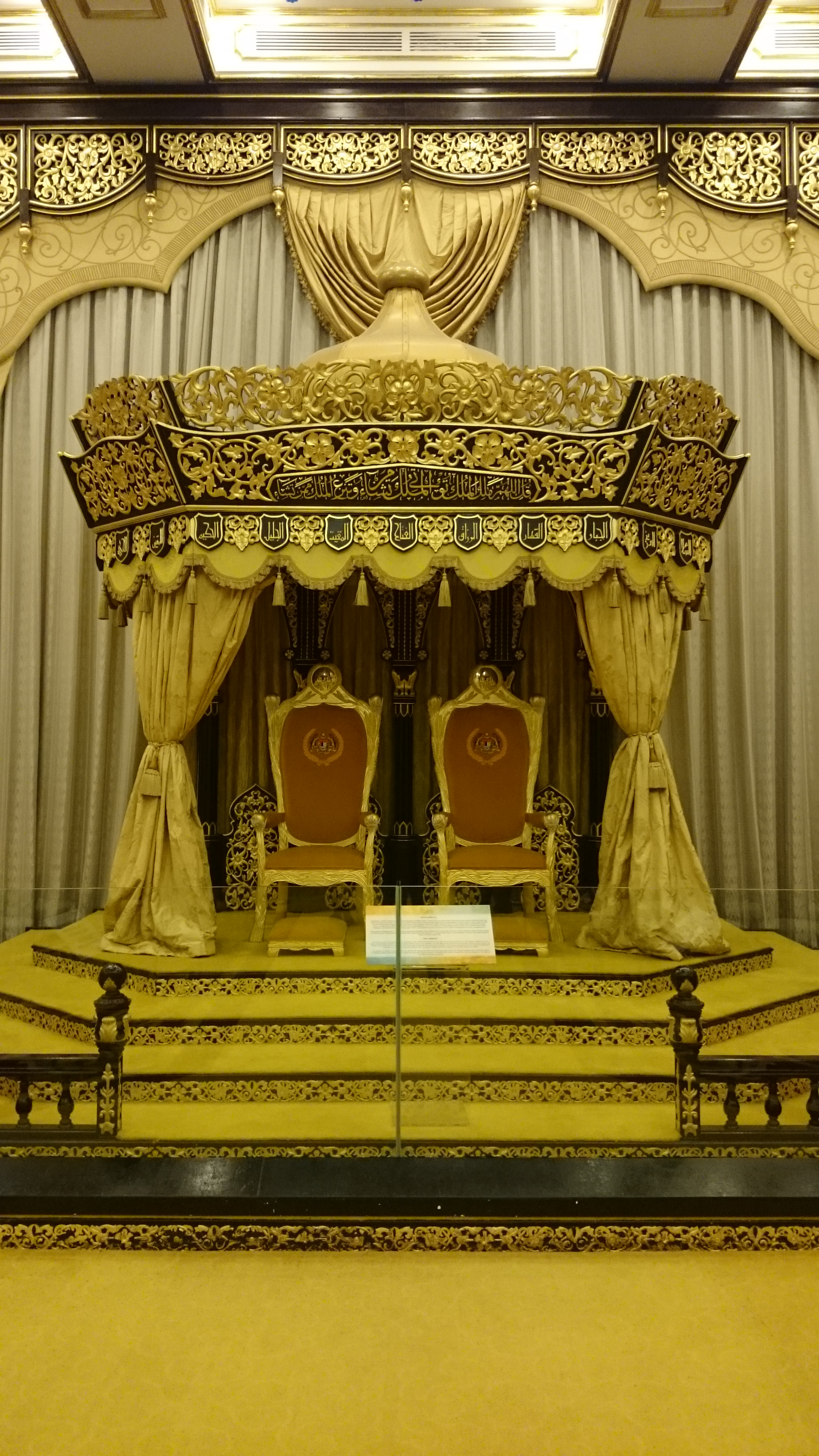
The Singgahsana at the Balai Rong Seri of Istana Negara.

The Singgahsana or throne in the Balai Rong Seri is the symbol of supremacy of the country. The King will sit on the Singahsana with honour and sovereignty. It is thus for the same purpose that the Singgahsana at the Balai Rong Seri of Istana Negara has been artistically and elaborately designed to reflect a structure that embodies traditional Malay values of the highest quality, befitting the official use of The Yang di-Pertuan Agong in carrying out his duties as the Head of State. The Singgahsana is the seat of The Yang di-Pertuan Agong and The Raja Permaisuri Agong during the Installation Ceremony. The structure is decorated with carvings that incorporate a combination of motifs, including that of the hibiscus, the national flower of Malaysia. The gold colour of the carved motifs serves to highlight the supreme feature of the Singgahsana. The overall design of the Singgahsana is of an upright structure to symbolise that all human beings ought to constantly remember and bow their Creator, that is, Allah the Almighty. The carved pillars symbolise the inspiration, endeavour and inspiration of the multiracial people of the country to achieve national unity, peace and prosperity. The inscription of the word Allah, Muhammad and a verse of the Quran signify the position of Islam as the official religion of the Federation. The verse of the Quran means: Say ye (0) Muhammad: 0 Allah Who holds the power of governing, it is You who gives the power to govern to whom You wish and it is You who withdraws the power to govern from whom You wish (Ali-Imran:26).

The second hall on the first floor is the Dewan Mengadap where the King receives honoured guests such as Head of States and foreign dignitaries. This hall doubles as a resting place of Sultans and Governors during the Conference of Rulers. The other rooms are Bilik Duta, Bilik Permaisuri and Bilik Menteri. Bilik Duta is where the King grants audience to the Prime Minister and also where honoured guests are received. The Queen receives her guests at the Bilik Permaisuri while the Bilik Menteri is the rest room for guests.

The Bilik Singgahsana Kecil or small throne room is also on the second hall on the first floor where is used as the venue for the presentation of appointment letters, swearing-in, pledge of allegiance and the taking of Oath of Secrecy ceremony by Cabinet Ministers (if it is held separately from the ceremony that involves all ministers); the ceremony for the presentation of Credentials to Malaysian Ambassadors and High Commissioners to foreign countries; the ceremony for the presentation of appointment letters to The Yang di-Pertua Negeri; the ceremony for an audience with The Yang di-Pertuan Agong for the presentation of appointment letters to Judges of the Federal Court, Court of Appeal and High Court; Ceremony for the presentation of appointment letters to the Director General of Anti-Corruption Commission of Malaysia, presentation of appointment letters to the Director General of Maritime Enforcement Agency of Malaysia and the presentation of appointment letters to the judges of Syariah Court.

=== West Wing ===
Meetings of the Conference of Rulers were held at the Bilik Mesyuarat Raja-Raja situated in the West Wing.

== Gallery ==
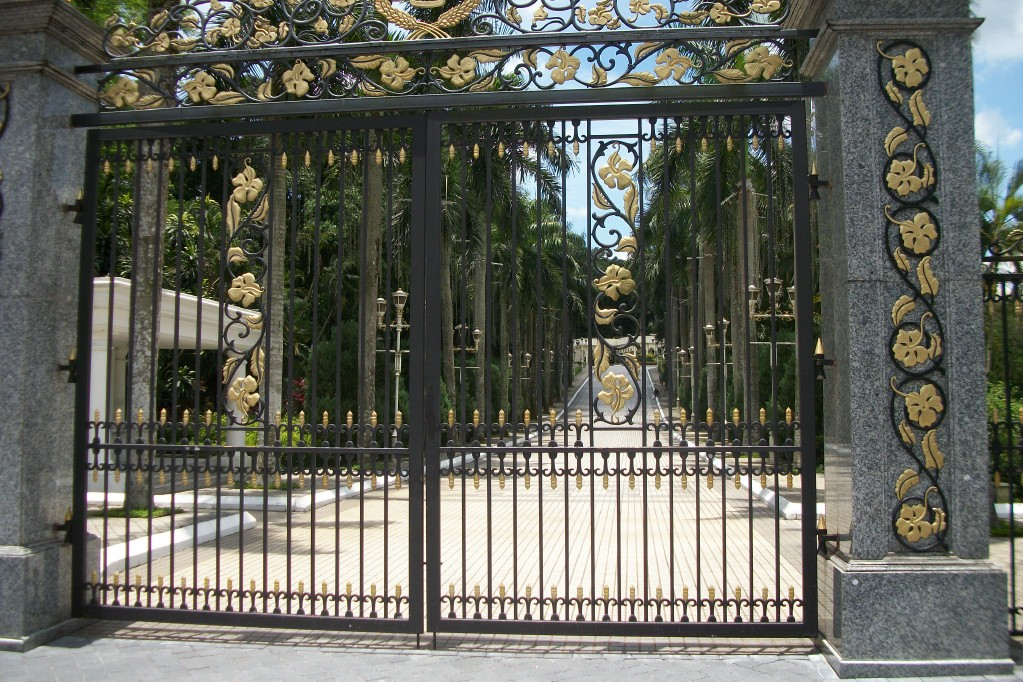
Palace gates.

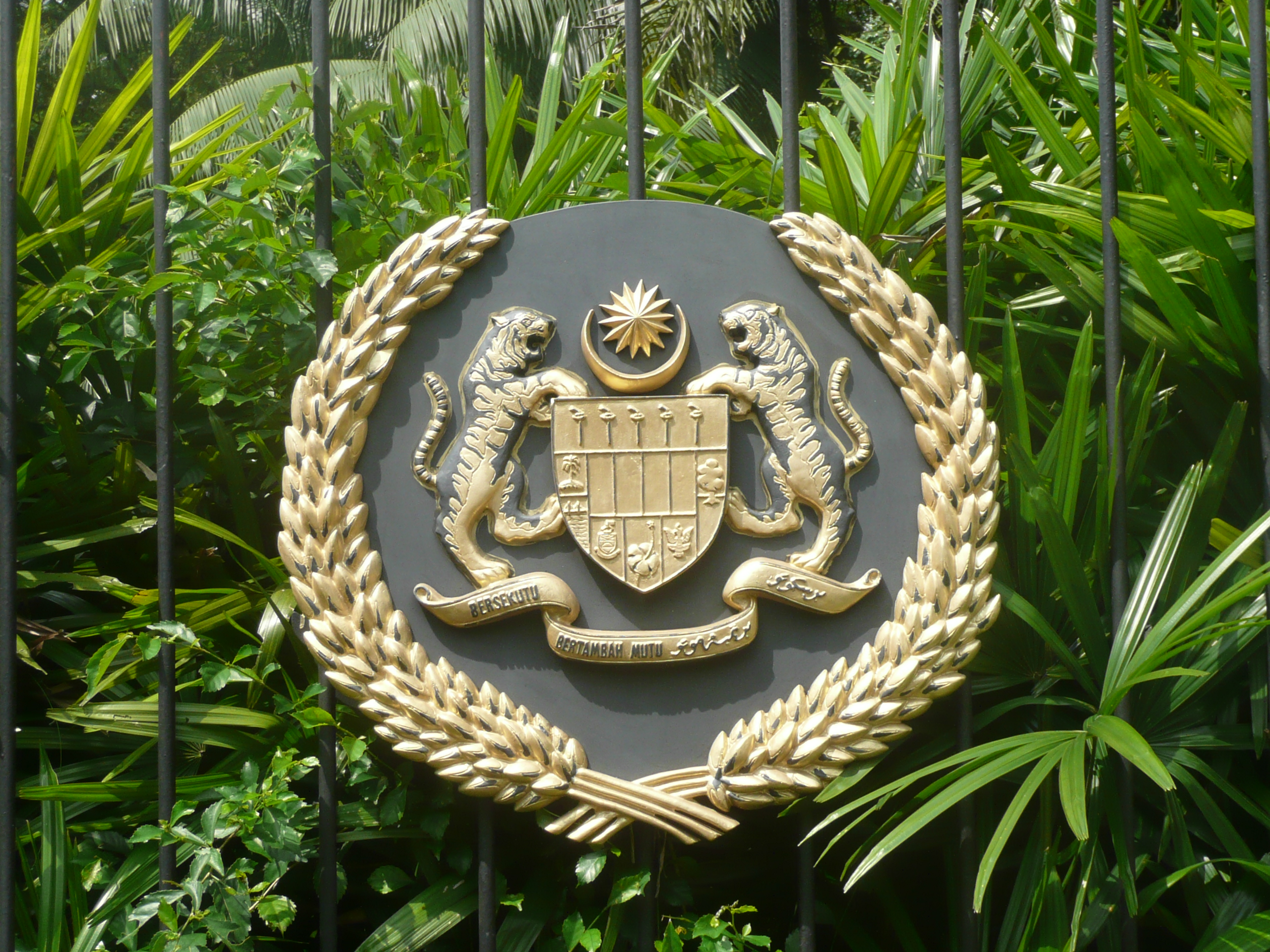
Malaysian coat of arms as part of the Royal Insignia on the fence of the palace.

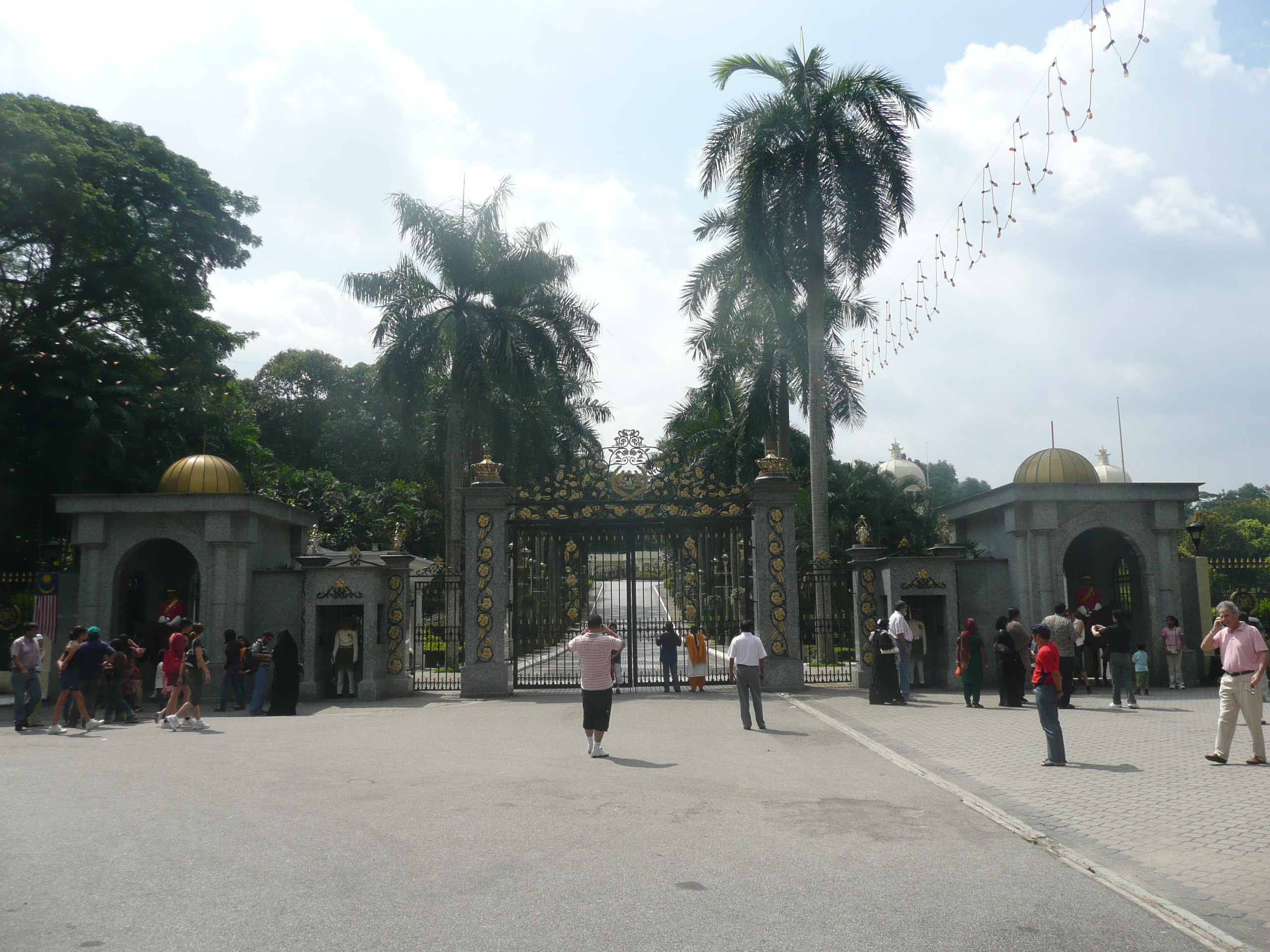
The main gate is popular with tourists as a photo opportunity.

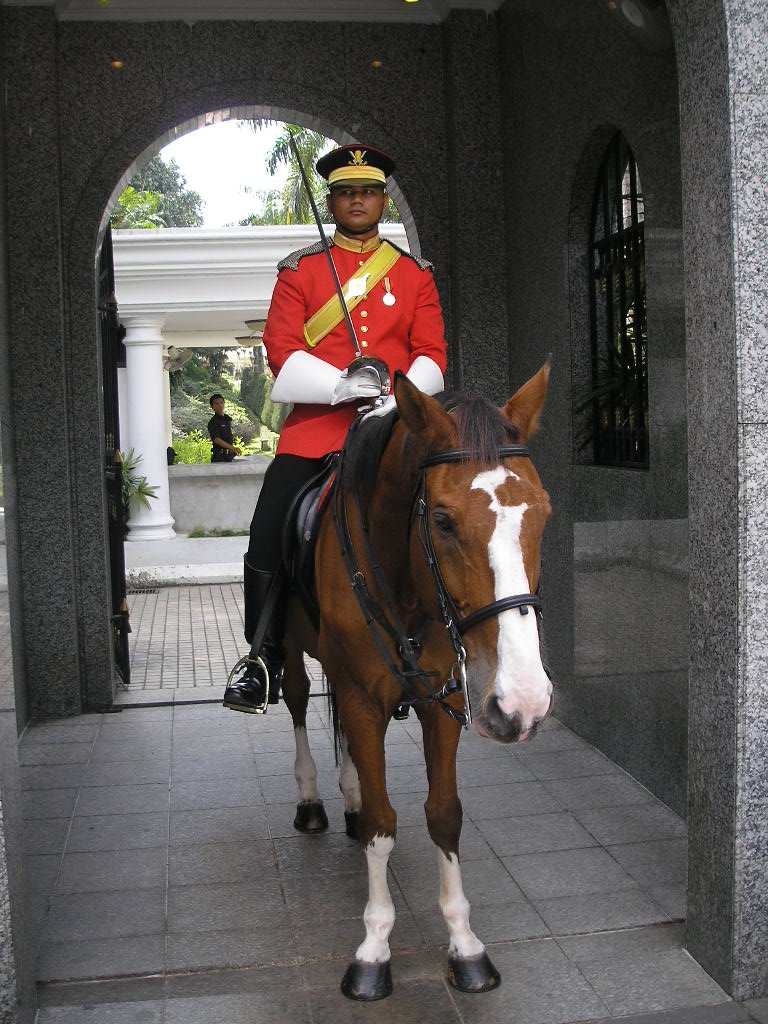
Mounted royal guard at the main gate.

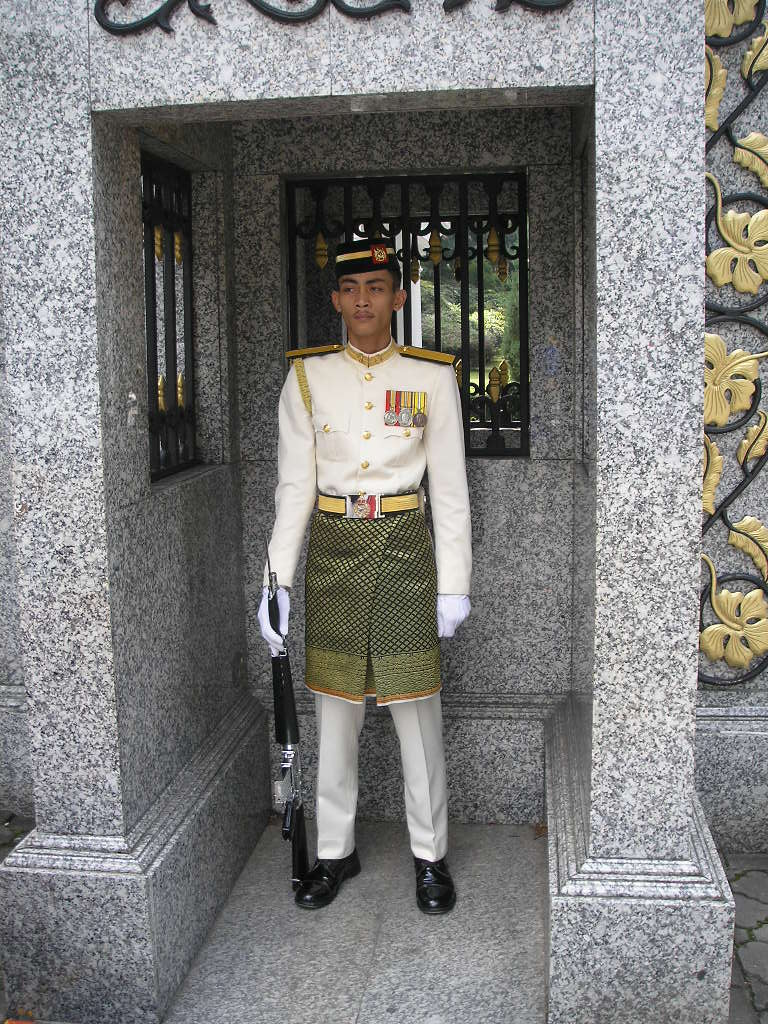
Royal guard in a traditional samping.

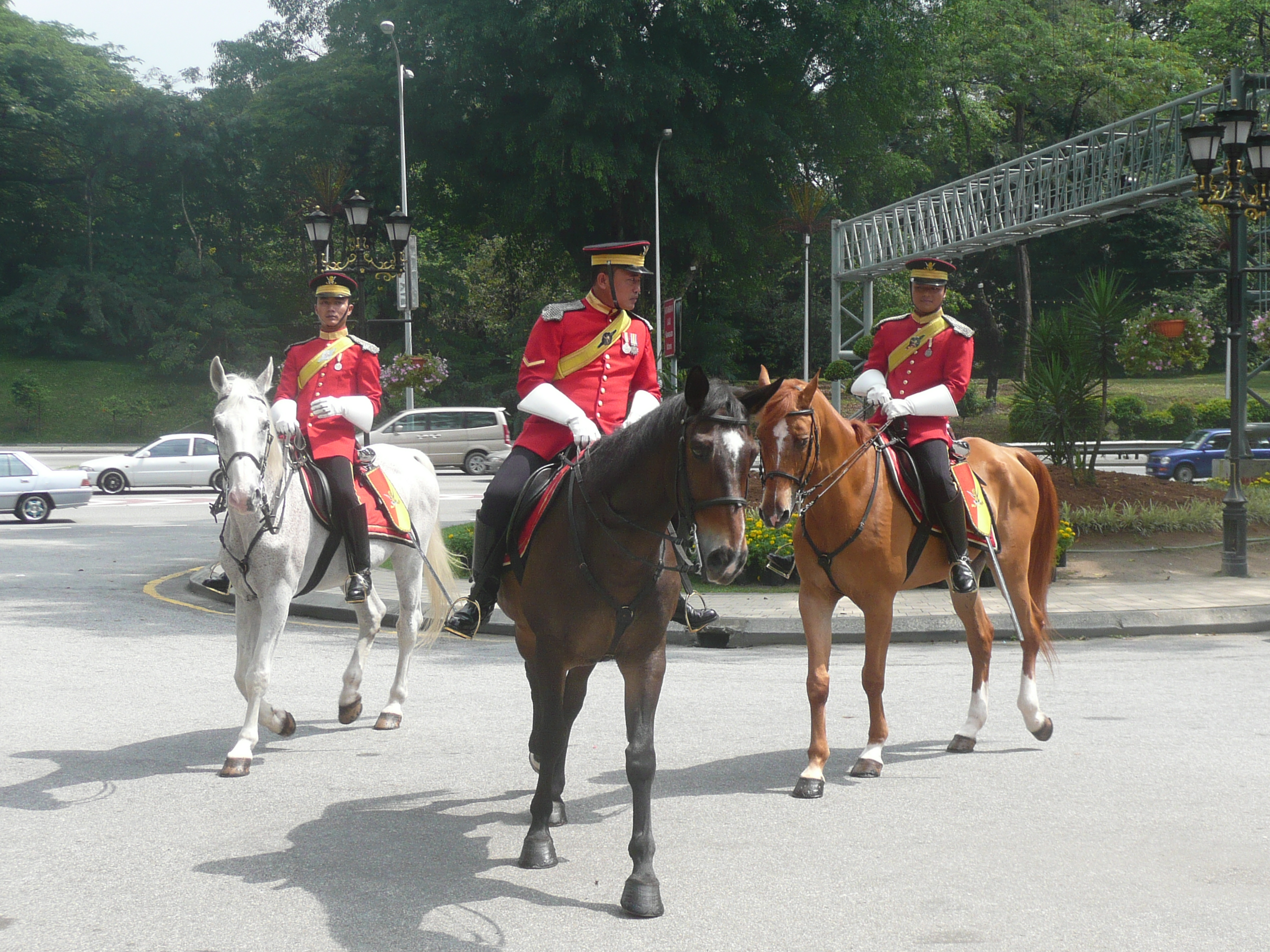
Changing of the Guard ceremony at 12'o clock noon.

== New Istana Negara ==
The new Istana Negara complex is located on Jalan Tuanku Abdul Halim in Kuala Lumpur. The court moved to the new palace in December 2011.

Construction commenced in mid-2007 and completed in 2011 at a total cost of RM997 million. Works Minister Shaziman Abu Mansor said the palace is now "Kuala Lumpur's most amazing architectural achievement, surpassing even the Twin Towers".

== See also ==
- Royal Regalia of Malaysia
