= Thean Hou Temple =

Chinese temple in Kuala Lumpur, Malaysia

- Malay: Tokong Thean Hou; Chinese: 乐圣岭天后宫/樂聖嶺天后宮
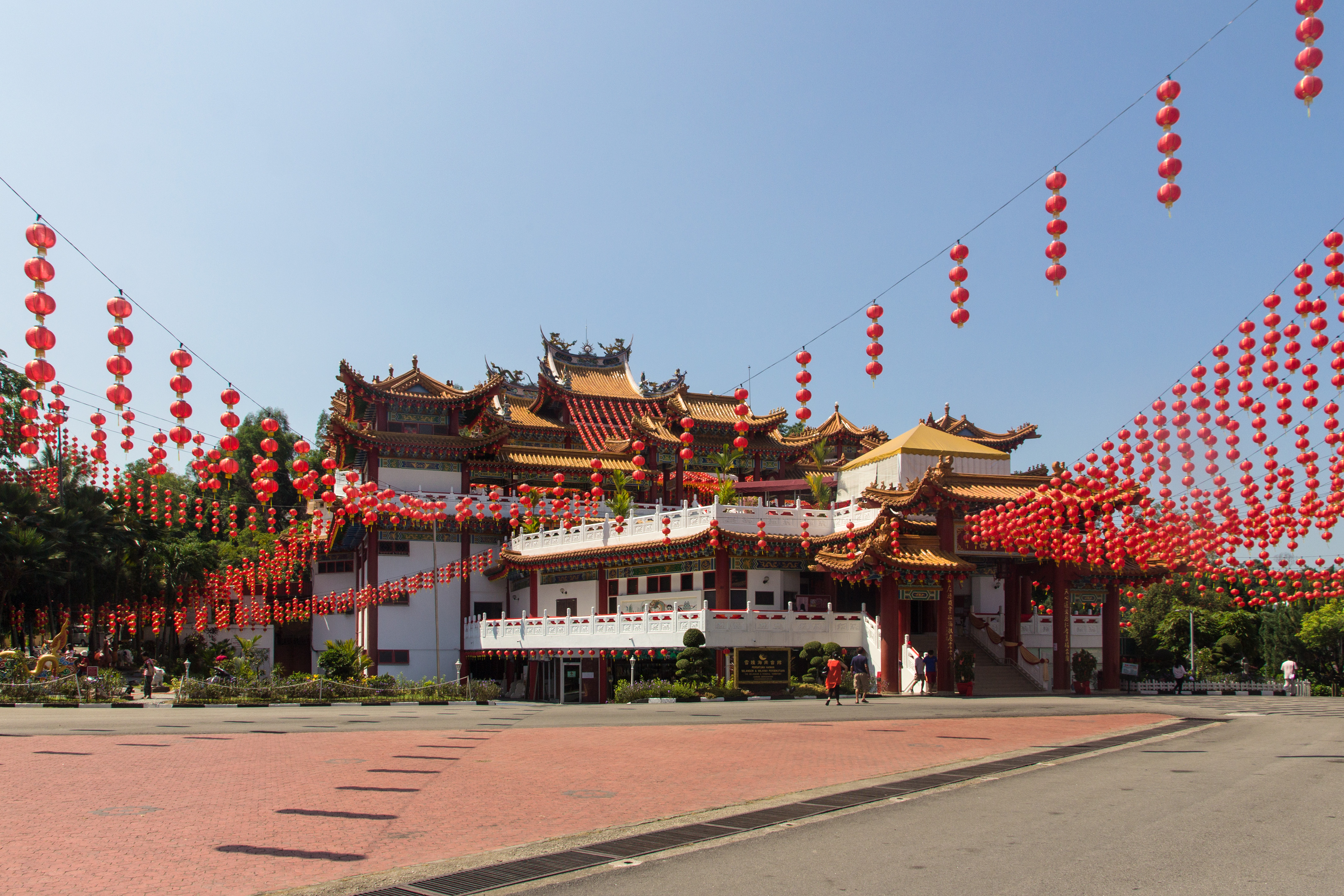

Religion
- Affiliation: Buddhism, Confucianism, Taoism
- Deity: Mazu; Guanyin; Shui Wei Sheng Niang; Yue Lao
- Governing body: Selangor and Federal Territory Hainan Association
- Year consecrated: 1985

Location
- Location: Seputeh, Kuala Lumpur
- Country: Malaysia
- Interactive map of Thean Hou Temple
- Coordinates: 3°7′18″N 101°41′16″E

Architecture
- Type: Chinese temple
- Established: 1981; 45 years ago
- Completed: 1987; 39 years ago

Website
- hainannet.com.my

Thean Hou Temple
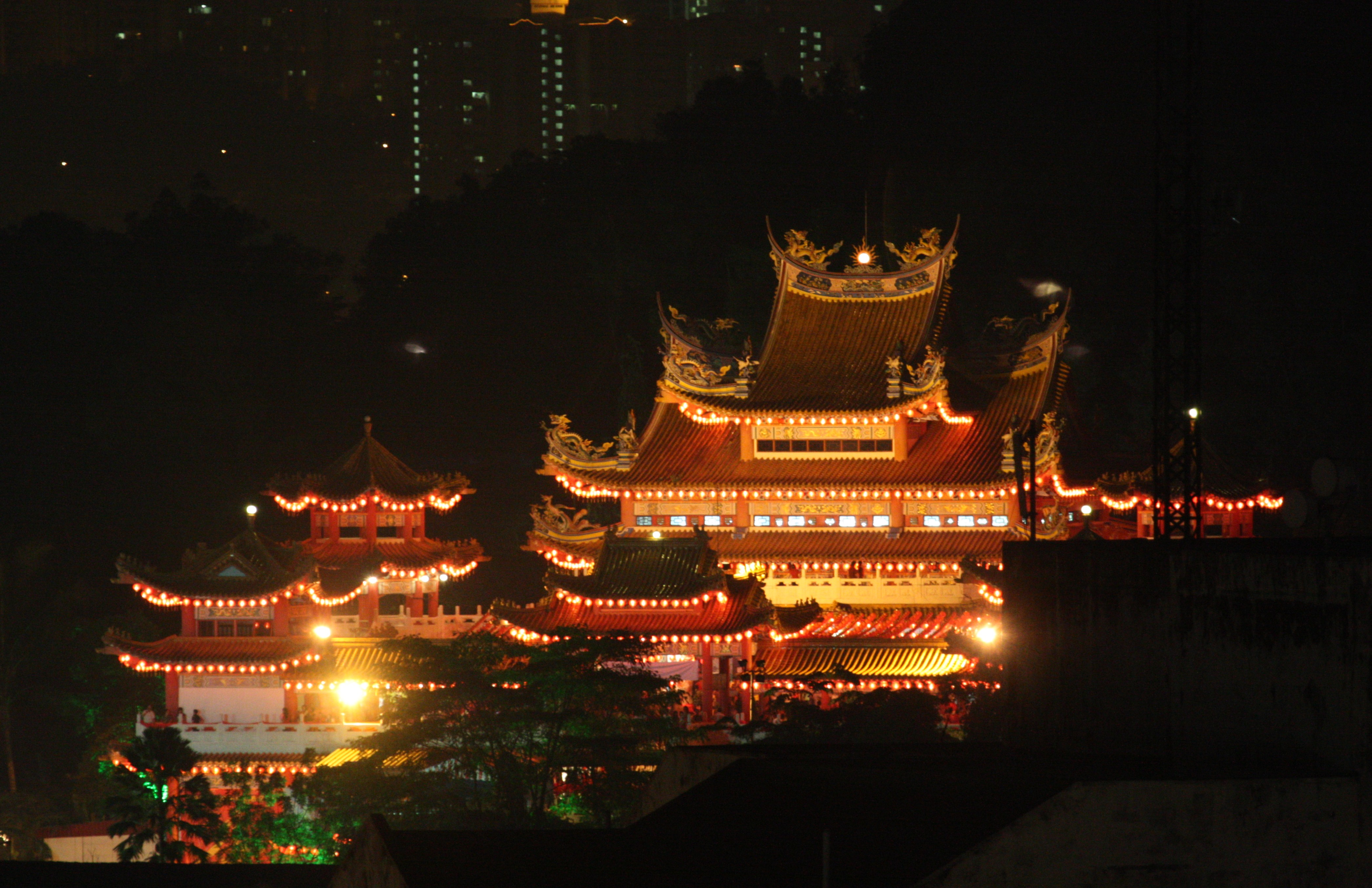
- The temple at night.
- Simplified Chinese: 天后宫
Transcriptions
Standard Mandarin
- Hanyu Pinyin: Tiānhòu Gōng
- Wade–Giles: T‘ien-hou Kung
Yue: Cantonese
- Yale Romanization: Tin1-hau6 Gung1
Southern Min
- Hokkien POJ: Thian-hiō-kiong

The Thean Hou Temple (Chinese: 乐圣岭天后宫/樂聖嶺天后宮) is a six-tiered temple of the Chinese sea goddess Mazu located in Kuala Lumpur, Malaysia. It is located on 1.67 acres (6,758 m^{2}) of land atop Robson Heights on Lorong Bellamy, overlooking Jalan Syed Putra. It was completed in 1987 and officially opened in 1989. The temple was built by Hainanese living in Malaysia and the property belongs to and is run by the Selangor and Federal Territory Hainan Association (Malay: Hainan Selangor dan Wilayah Persekutuan; Chinese: 雪隆海南会馆/雪隆海南會館). It is one of the largest temples in Southeast Asia.

== History ==
The Thean Hou Temple was constructed from 1981 and completed in 1987 at a cost of approximately RM7 million. The following are some of the Hainanese people that contributed to the success in the completion of the Thean Hou Temple: Robert Chow (Architect), Lim Meng Swee (Structural Engineer), Goh T.K (M&E Engineer), Loong Yoke Phin (President), Heng Fook Kum, Wing Hong How, Tan Koon Swan, Tan Loon Swan, Foo Siang Foh, Loong Yeh May and to all Hainanese that donated money by purchasing part of the building i.e. columns and beams.

The installation dates of the Goddesses and Bodhisattva as follows:

- 16 November 1985 — Tian Hou Niang Niang
- 19 October 1986 — Guan Yin (Bodhisattva)
- 16 November 1986 — Shui Wei Sheng Niang

The temple was officially opened on 3 September 1989. Guan Yin was first given the appellation of "Goddess of Mercy" or the Mercy Goddess by Jesuit missionaries or The Society of Jesus in China. In Buddhist scriptures, Guan Yin is recognized as Avalokitesvara, the Bodhisattva of Compassion.

== Accessibility ==
The temple is directly accessible from Persiaran Endah that connects to Jalan Robson towards the north, but has an incredibly steep gradient for private vehicles and minivans to both ascend and descent on. A much shorter and narrower road also indirectly connects to the temple's car park to the northwest, but instead cuts through residential units near Bukit Robson.

== Features ==
=== Architectural ===
This syncretic temple with elements of Buddhism, Confucianism and Taoism is a grandiose structure which combines modern architectural techniques and traditional design featuring imposing pillars, roofs, ornate carvings and intricate embellishments. Its architecture has made it a tourist destination. The front entrance of the temple features a multi-arched gateway with red pillars, the colour symbolic of prosperity and good fortune. Souvenir stalls and a canteen are found on the first level. The second-level houses the multi-purpose hall while offices are located on the third level. The fourth level has three tiers and the prayer hall is located here.

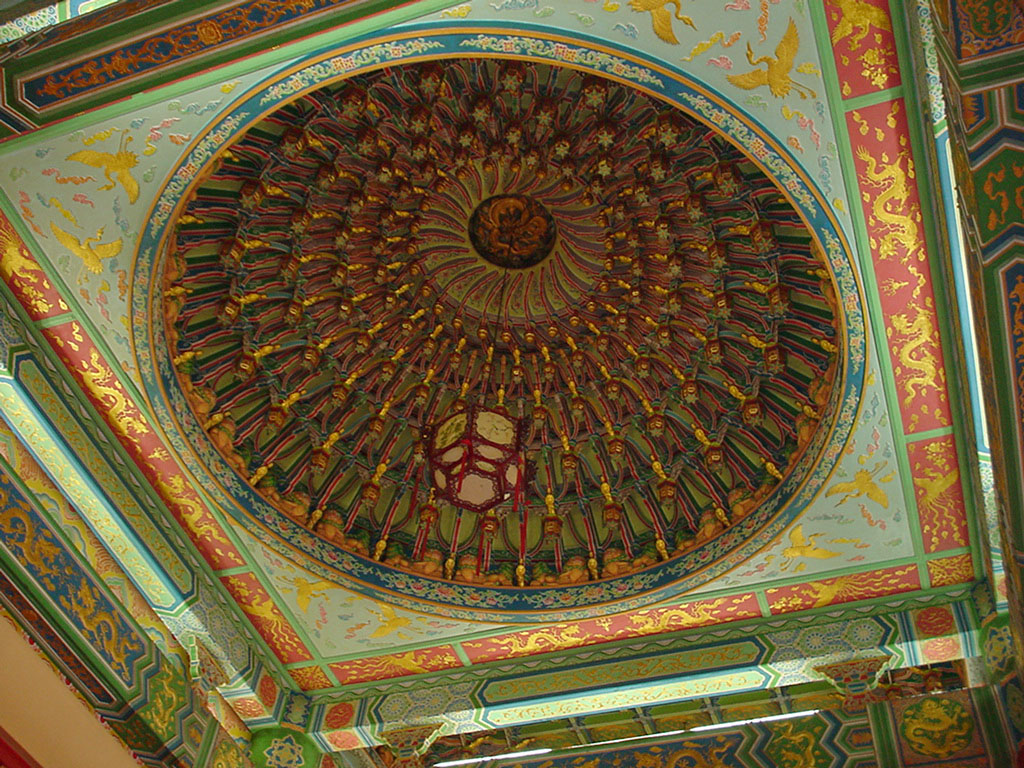
Ceiling art.

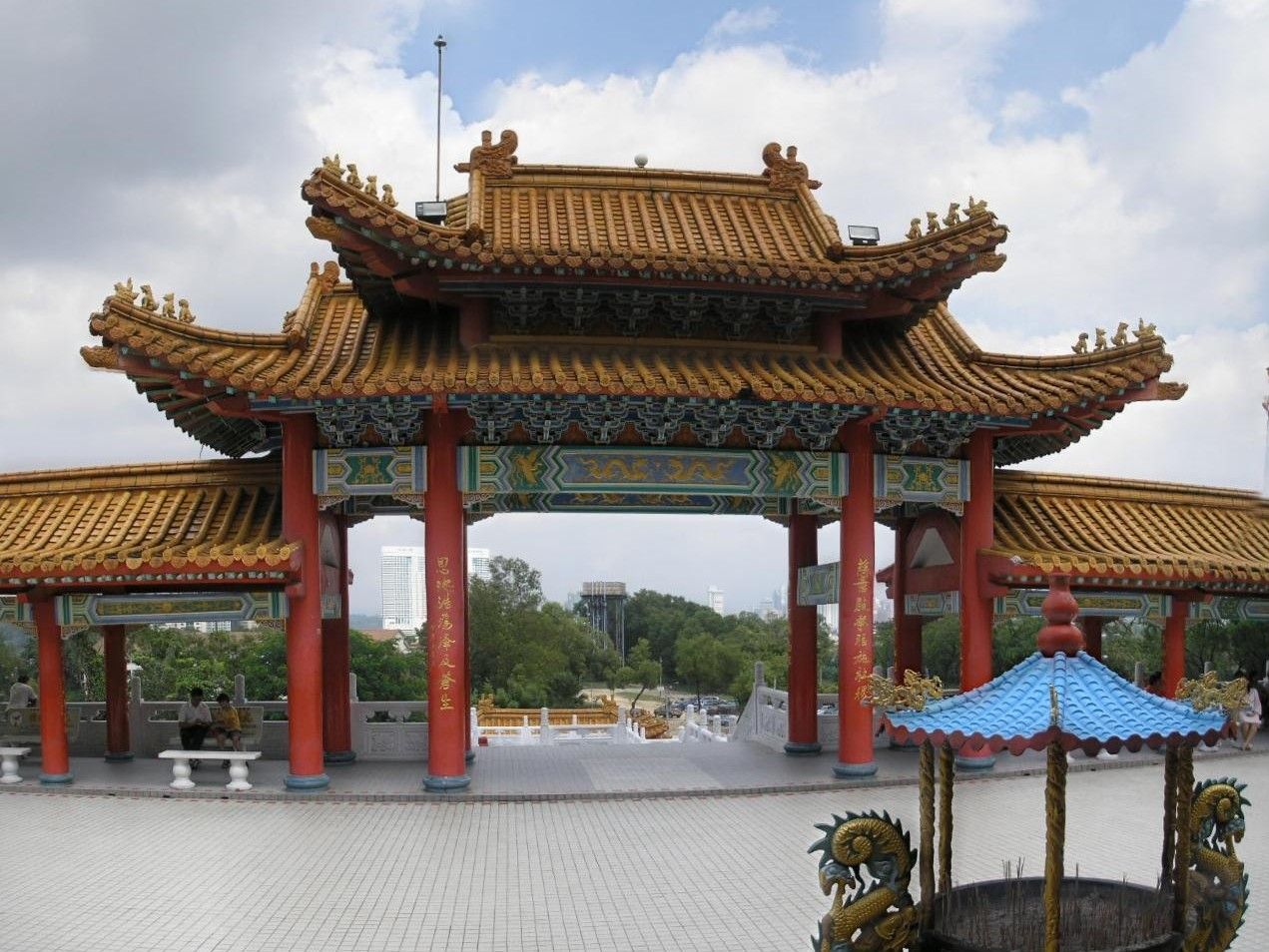
Main gate.

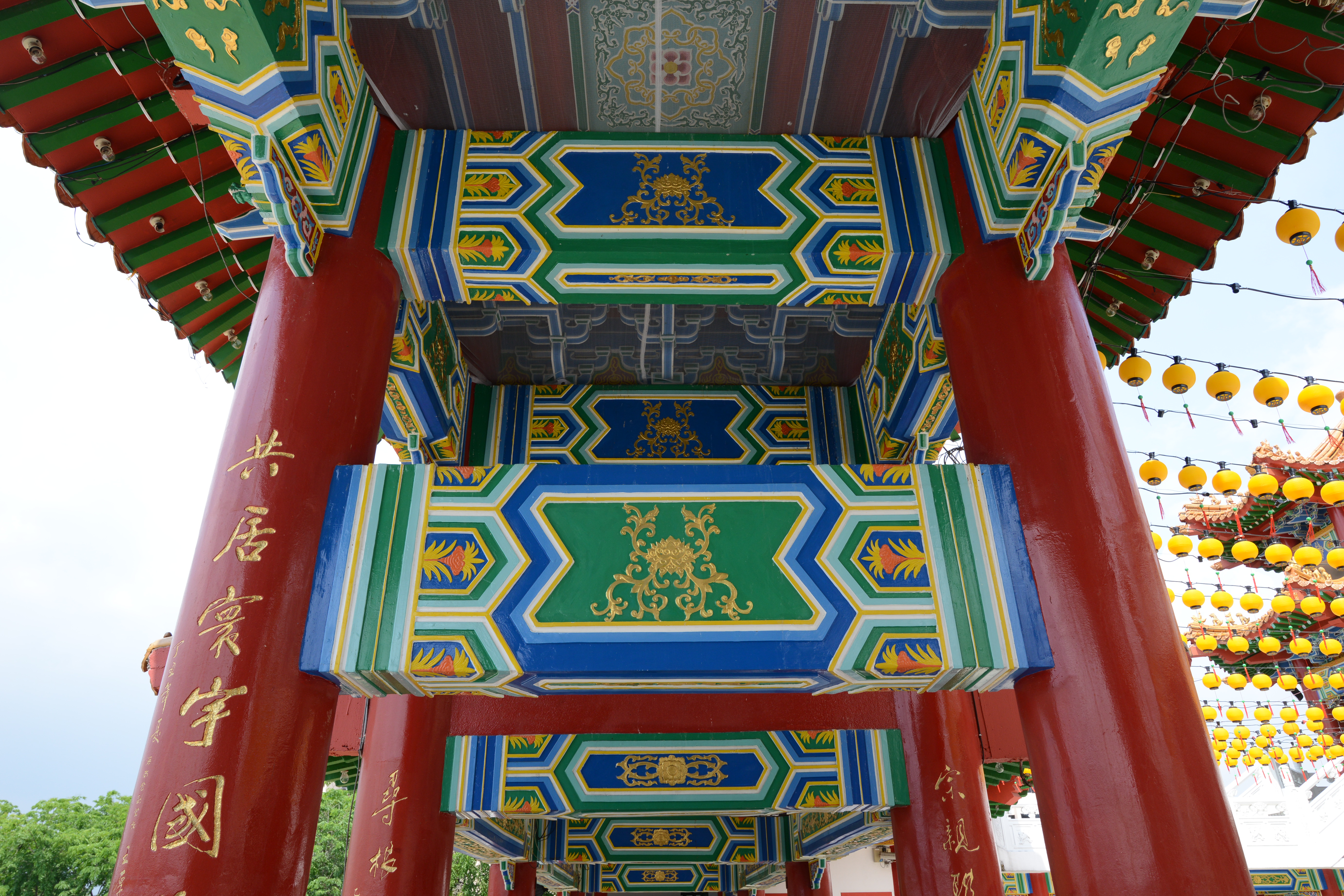
Red pillar with Chinese characters.

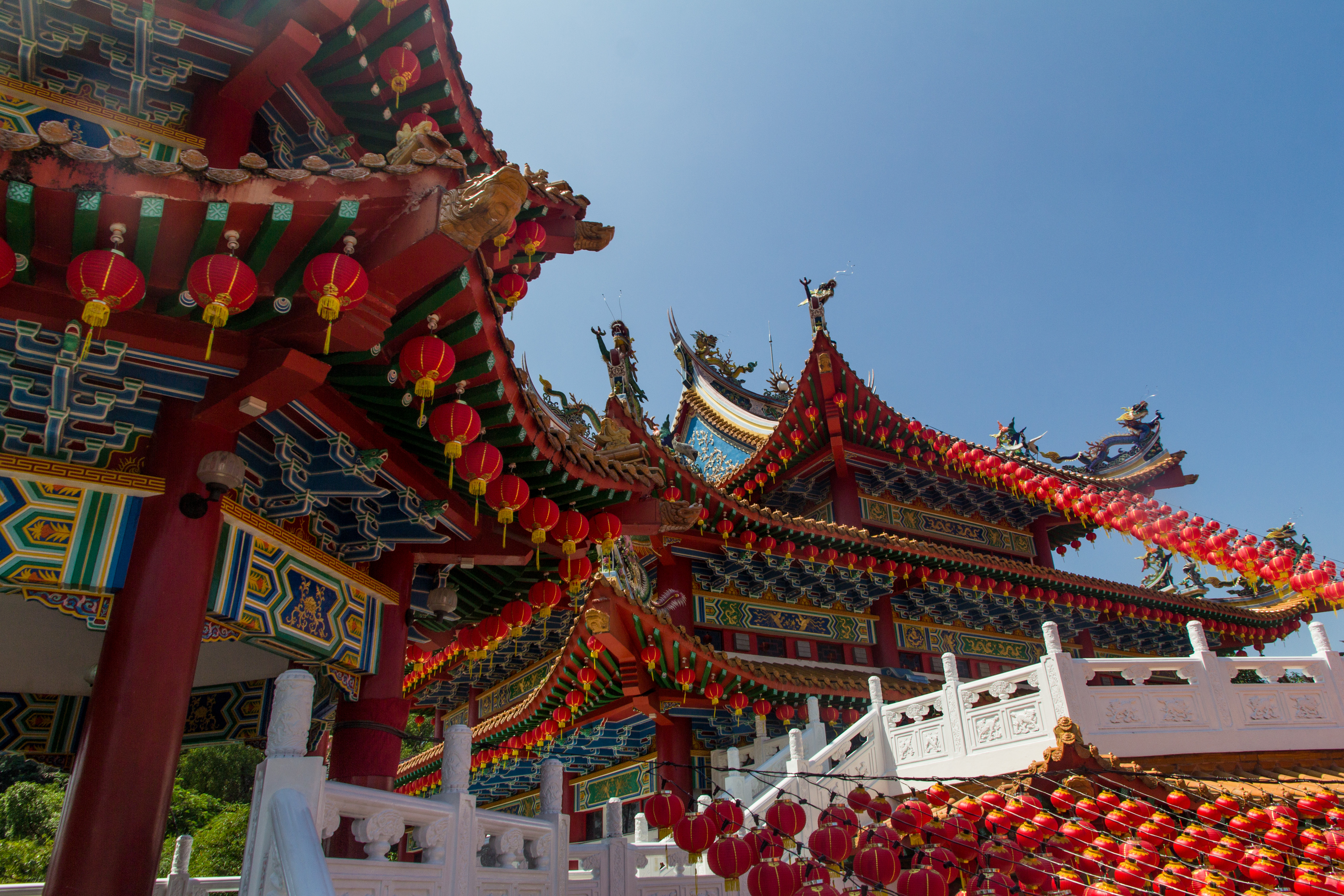
Roofing art.

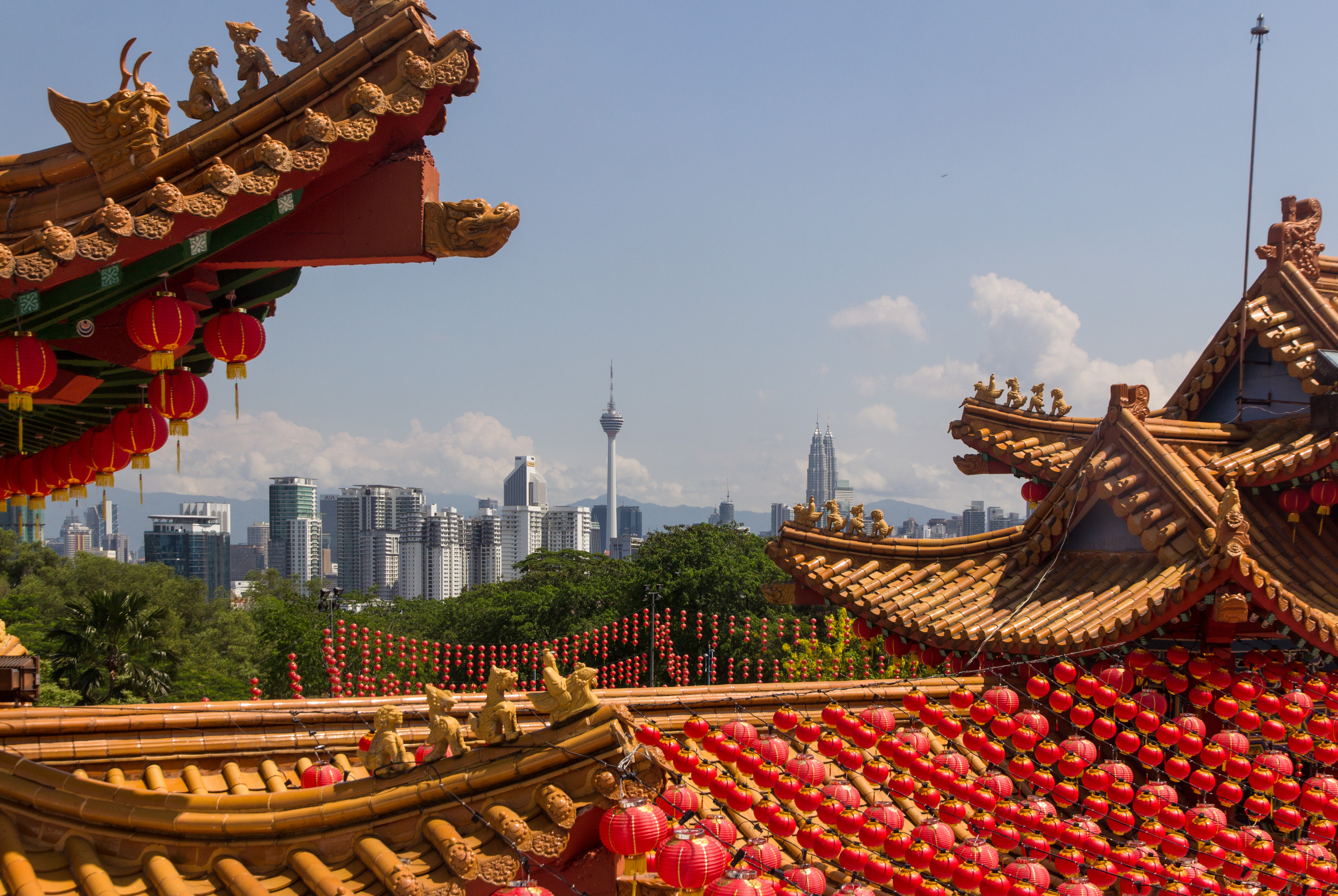
The temple overlooking the city of Kuala Lumpur.

=== Prayer hall ===
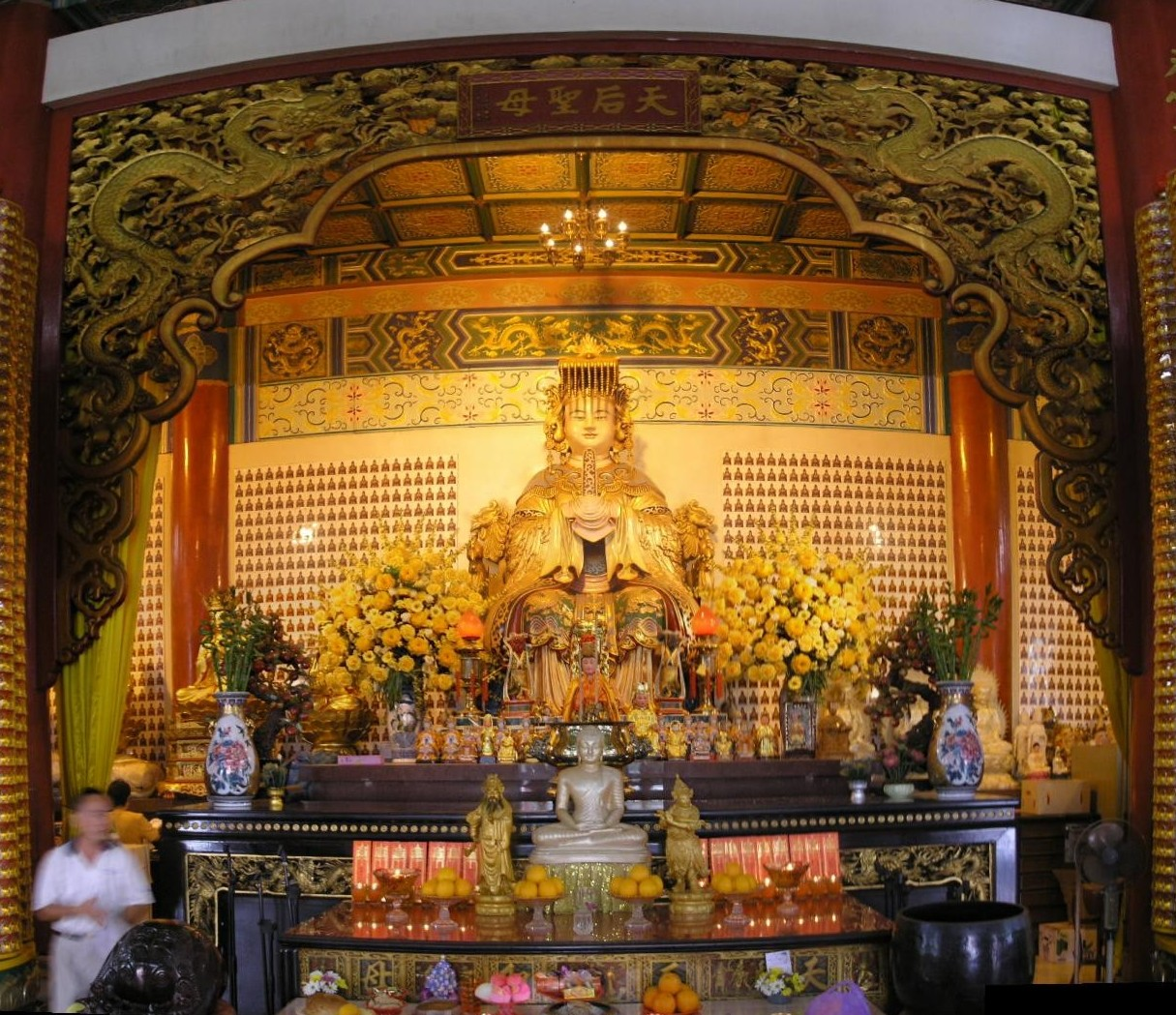
Interior prayer hall with Mazu (Tian Hou).

The prayer hall houses three altars, each altar with a large statue of one particular deity or goddess. The altar on the right is dedicated to Guan Yin, the Goddess of Mercy. Tian Hou Niang Niang is in the centre while Shui Wei Sheng Niang (the Goddess of the Waterfront) is at the left. In the middle of the hall and between the altars are two pairs of Kau Cim oracles that can be used by visitors. Despite the dedication to Tian Hou, worship of Guan Yin is a recurrent theme at the temple.

=== External ===
In addition to her altar in the prayer hall, there is a smaller statue of Guan Yin to the right of the hall, set amongst rocks and falling water. Here one can kneel and receive a blessing of water from the statue. Outside the temple at the entrance to the grounds, there is a larger statue, similarly set amongst rocks and falling water. Other features include a Chinese Medicinal Herbs Garden, a Wishing Well as well as a Tortoise Pond. There is also a large statue of the goddess opposite the temple, along with a collection of other large statues that include representations of the twelve animals of Chinese astrology. A Yue Lao statue was also placed in the temple grounds, hence making Thean Hou Temple one of the popular pilgrimage sites among believers in Malaysia, especially from Klang Valley region who seek for relationships and marriage.

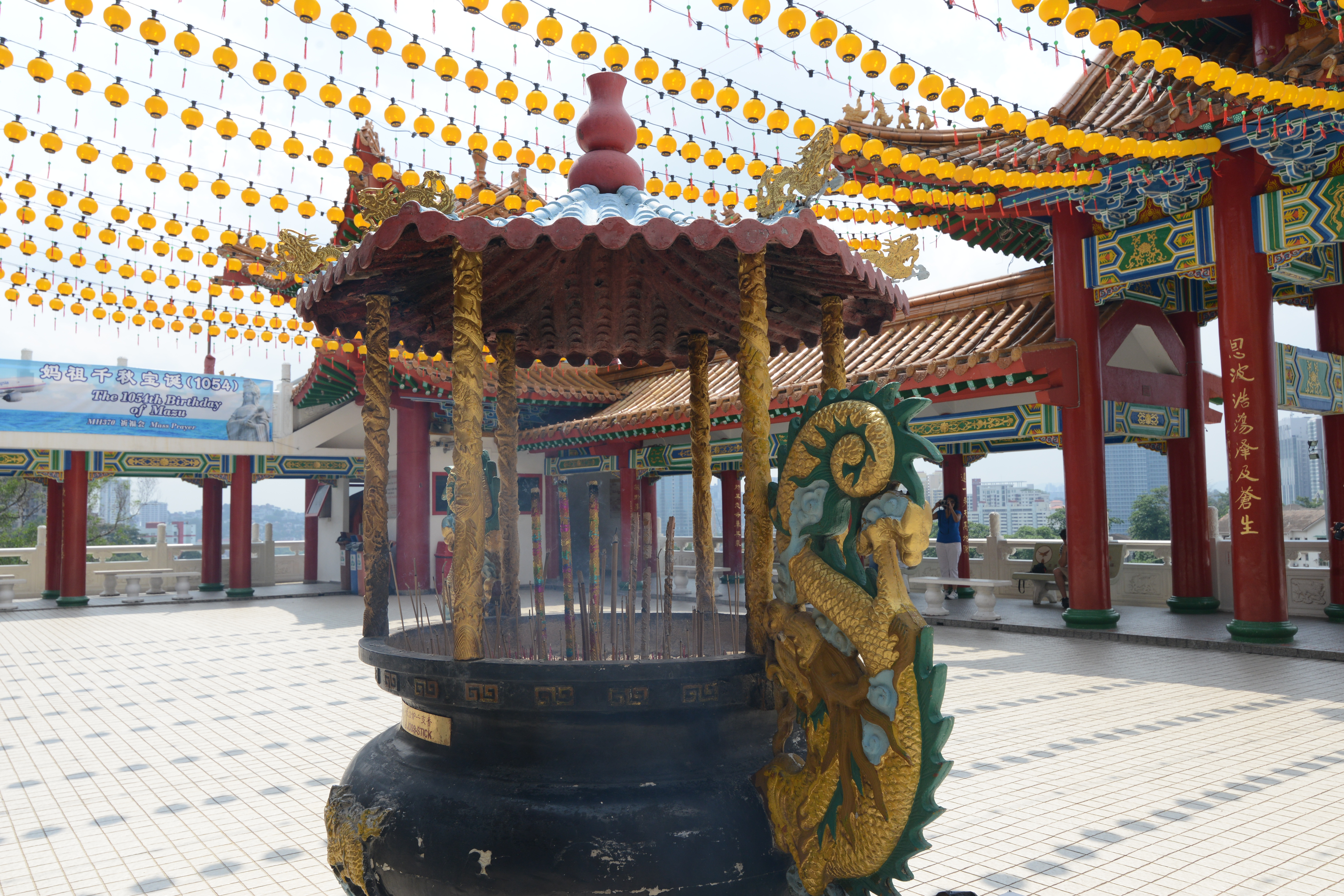
Incense burner.

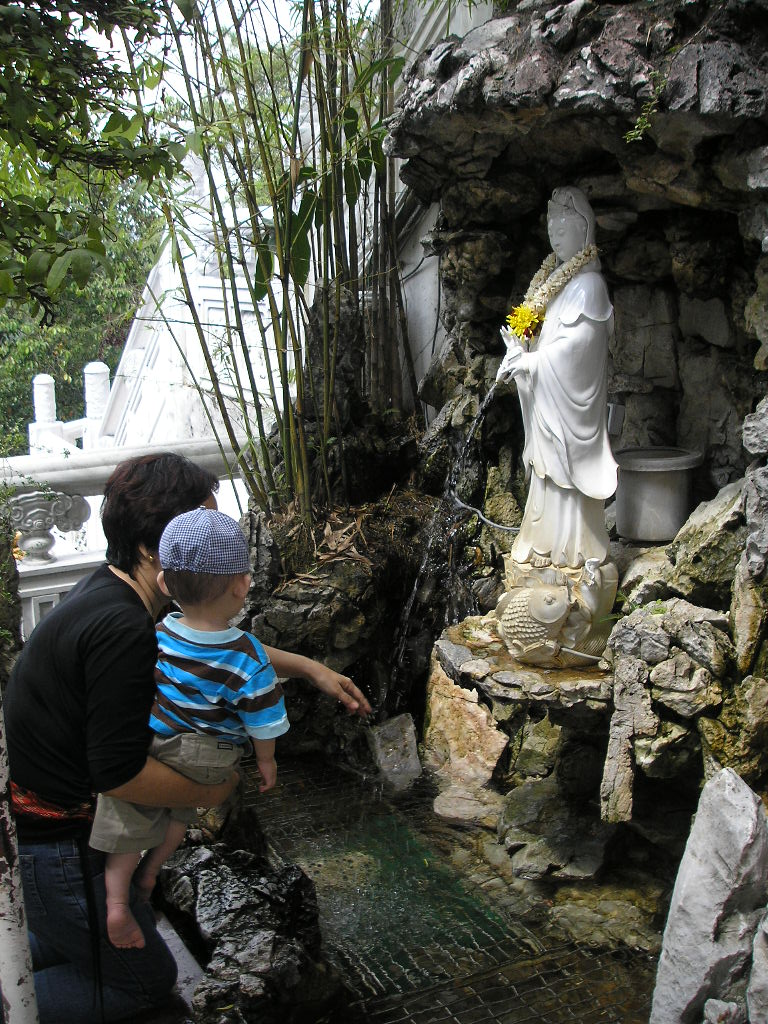
Small fountain with Guanyin dispensing water from her jar.

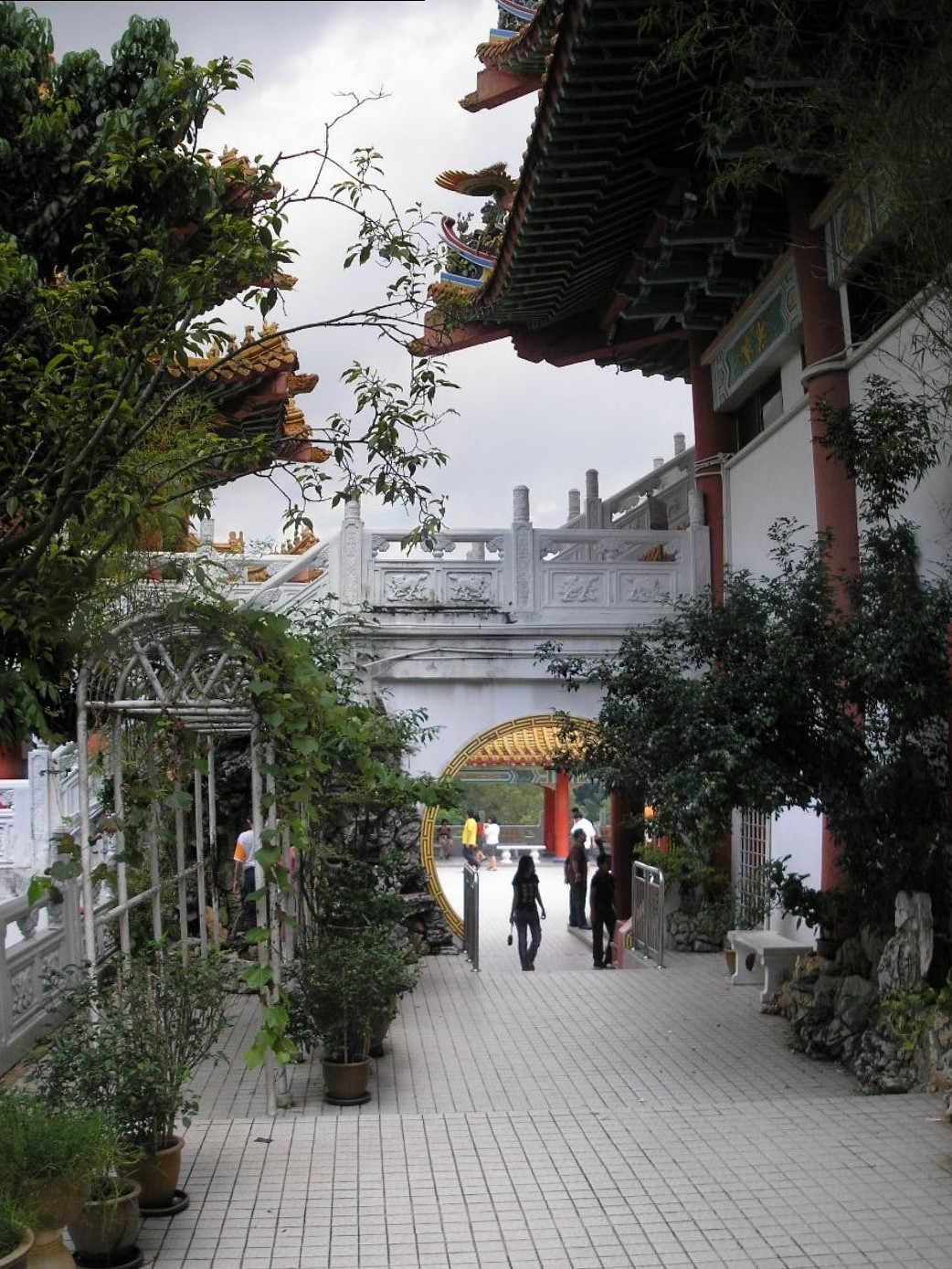
The temple garden.

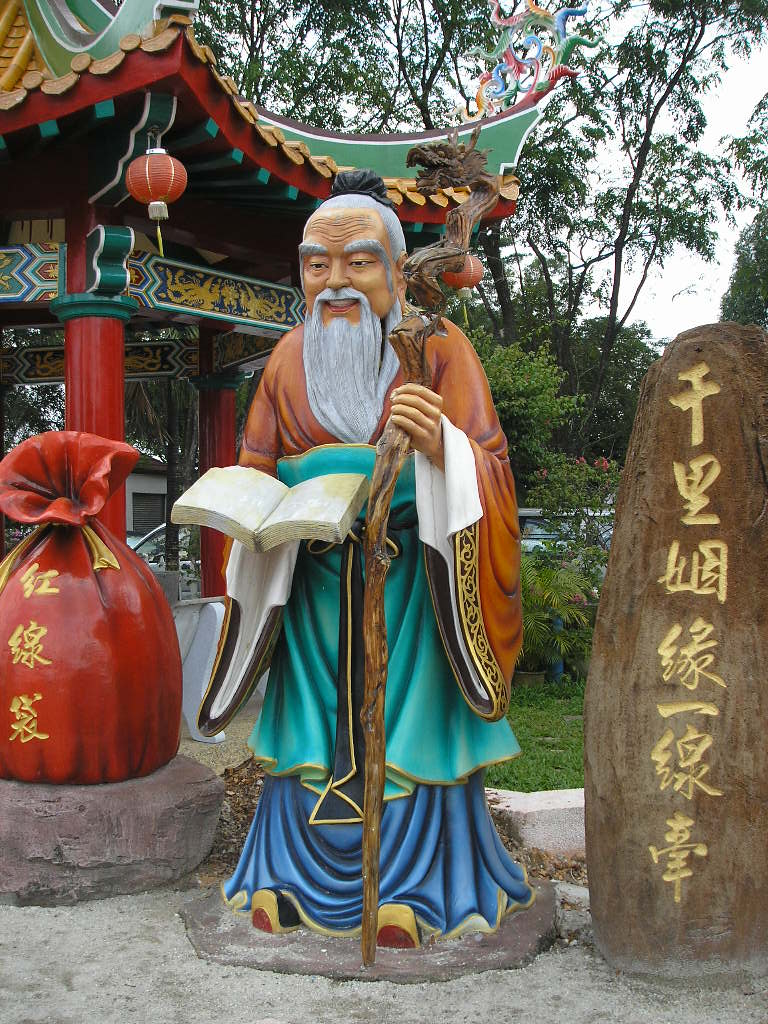
Yue Lao statue.

== Activities ==
=== Religious and cultural ===
Activities such as the grand birthday celebrations for Goddess Tian Hou, Goddess Kuan Yin and the Goddess of the Waterfront are conducted at Thean Hou Temple. Buddhist activities include Buddhist chanting sessions and Wesak Day celebrations. Cultural activities include the annual Mid-Autumn Festival during the eighth lunar month and the Chinese New Year celebration. In 2019, the temple was allocated RM30,000 by the federal government to encourage them to hold more cultural events.

=== Others ===
The temple also offers fortune-telling and marriage registration services and traditional Chinese exercise and martial arts activities such as qigong, tai chi and wushu classes are conducted at the temple compound.
