= Bukit Petaling =

Coordinates: 3°07′48.6″N 101°42′00.1″E

Bukit Petaling is a location in Kuala Lumpur, Malaysia and the former site of the Istana Negara, or National Palace of Malaysia. Jalan Istana and Jalan Syed Putra are the two major roads servicing this area.

The hill, once used for Yap Ah Loy's tapioca plantation, was converted into a golf course in the late 1890s.
