= List of rail transit stations in the Klang Valley area =

The Klang Valley, Malaysia, is served by the Klang Valley Integrated Transit System, consisting of various rail transit services. As of 2026, the system encompasses 593.3 kilometres (368.7 mi) of grade-separated railway with 216 operational stations. (Note: Counting interchange stations (paid area integration) and connecting stations (non-paid area integration) within the same station building only once. This number only reflects opened launched/opened lines; future lines are not included (i.e. MRT Circle Line))

The following are lists of rail transit stations in the Klang Valley, sorted alphabetically and by route.

== List of stations in alphabetical order ==
Stations with two or more station codes indicate an interchange station, offering same-building transfers between rail lines. However, not all lines have linked paid areas within their interchange stations, as different rail operators have different ticketing systems, requiring passengers to tap out of one system and tap in again when transferring between lines.

Stations with the same name but listed separately serve the same area, however, essentially operate as different stations due to not being in the same station building.

Station	Station Code	Photo	Line(s)	Operator	Type	Local authority	Opened	Remarks
Abdullah Hukum	KD01; KJ17	Abdullah Hukum	2 Tanjung Malim–Port Klang Line 5 Kelana Jaya Line	KTM; Rapid Rail	Commuter rail LRT	Kuala Lumpur	1 September 1998 (LRT); 28 October 2018 (KTM Komuter)	
Alam Megah	KJ35	Alam Megah	5 Kelana Jaya Line	Rapid Rail	LRT	Shah Alam	30 June 2016	
Alam Sutera	SP21	Alam Sutera	4 Sri Petaling Line	Rapid Rail	LRT	Subang Jaya	31 October 2015	
Ampang	AG18	Ampang	3 Ampang Line	Rapid Rail	LRT	Ampang Jaya	16 December 1996	
Ampang Park (LRT)	KJ9	Ampang Park	5 Kelana Jaya Line	Rapid Rail	LRT	Kuala Lumpur	1 June 1999	Walking distance to PY20 Ampang Park (MRT)
Ampang Park (MRT)	PY20		12 Putrajaya Line	Rapid Rail	MRT	Kuala Lumpur	16 March 2023	Walking distance to KJ9 Ampang Park (LRT)
Angkasapuri	KD02	Angkasapuri	2 Tanjung Malim–Port Klang Line	KTM	Commuter rail	Kuala Lumpur	14 August 1995	
Ara Damansara	KJ26	Ara Damansara	5 Kelana Jaya Line	Rapid Rail	LRT	Petaling Jaya	30 June 2016	
Asia Jaya	KJ21	Asia Jaya	5 Kelana Jaya Line	Rapid Rail	LRT	Petaling Jaya	1 September 1998	
Awan Besar	SP19	Awan Besar	4 Sri Petaling Line	Rapid Rail	LRT	Kuala Lumpur	31 October 2015	
Bandaraya	AG6; SP6	Bandaraya	3 Ampang Line 4 Sri Petaling Line	Rapid Rail	LRT	Kuala Lumpur	16 December 1996	Walking distance to KA03 Bank Negara. Currently named Bandaraya–UOB under the station naming rights programme
Bandar Baru Klang	SA17	Bandar Baru Klang	11 Shah Alam Line	Rapid Rail	LRT	Klang	29 June 2026	
Bandar Bukit Tinggi	SA24	Bandar Bukit Tinggi	11 Shah Alam Line	Rapid Rail	LRT	Klang	29 June 2026	
Bandar Puteri	SP27	Bandar Puteri	4 Sri Petaling Line	Rapid Rail	LRT	Subang Jaya	31 March 2016	
Bandar Tasik Selatan	KB04; KT2; SP15	Bandar Tasik Selatan	1 Batu Caves–Pulau Sebang Line 4 Sri Petaling Line 7 KLIA Transit	KTM; Rapid Rail; ERL	Airport rail link Commuter rail LRT	Kuala Lumpur	10 November 1995 (KTM Komuter); 11 July 1998 (LRT); 20 June 2002 (ERL)	There is no paid-area-to-paid-area integration. Walkways connect the three lines.
Bandar Tun Hussein Onn	KG29	Bandar Tun Hussein Onn	9 Kajang Line	Rapid Rail	MRT	Kajang	17 July 2017	
Bandar Tun Razak	SP14	Bandar Tun Razak	4 Sri Petaling Line	Rapid Rail	LRT	Kuala Lumpur	11 July 1998	
Bandar Utama	KG09; SA01	Bandar Utama	9 Kajang Line 11 Shah Alam Line	Rapid Rail	MRT; LRT	Petaling Jaya	16 December 2016 (MRT); 29 June 2026 (LRT)	There is no paid-area-to-paid-area integration. An elevated walkway connects the two lines.
Bangi	KB09	Bangi	1 Batu Caves–Pulau Sebang Line	KTM	Commuter rail	Kajang	1995	
Bangsar	KJ16	Bangsar	5 Kelana Jaya Line	Rapid Rail	LRT	Kuala Lumpur	1 September 1998	Currently named Bangsar–Bank Rakyat under the station naming rights programme
Bank Negara	KA03	Bank Negara	1 Batu Caves–Pulau Sebang Line 2 Tanjung Malim–Port Klang Line	KTM	Commuter rail	Kuala Lumpur	14 August 1995	Walking distance to AG6 SP6 Bandaraya
Batang Benar	KB10	Batang Benar	1 Batu Caves–Pulau Sebang Line	KTM	Commuter rail	Seremban	1995	
Batang Kali	KA12	Batang Kali	2 Tanjung Malim–Port Klang Line	KTM	Commuter rail	Hulu Selangor	21 April 2007	
Batu 11 Cheras	KG30	Batu 11 Cheras	9 Kajang Line	Rapid Rail	MRT	Kajang	17 July 2017	
Batu Caves	KC05	Batu Caves	1 Batu Caves–Pulau Sebang Line	KTM	Commuter rail	Selayang	April 2010	
Batu Kentonmen	KC02	Batu Kentonmen	1 Batu Caves–Pulau Sebang Line	KTM	Commuter rail	Kuala Lumpur	April 2010	
Batu Tiga	KD10	Batu Tiga	2 Tanjung Malim–Port Klang Line	KTM	Commuter rail	Shah Alam	1995	
Bukit Badak	KD13	Bukit Badak	2 Tanjung Malim–Port Klang Line	KTM	Commuter rail	Klang	1995	
Bukit Bintang (Monorail)	MR6	Bukit Bintang Monorail	8 KL Monorail	Rapid Rail	Monorail	Kuala Lumpur	31 August 2003	Walking distance to KG18A Bukit Bintang (MRT)
Bukit Bintang (MRT)	KG18A	Bukit Bintang MRT	9 Kajang Line	Rapid Rail	MRT	Kuala Lumpur	17 July 2017	Walking distance to MR6 Bukit Bintang (Monorail) Currently named Pavilion Kuala Lumpur–Bukit Bintang under the station naming rights programme
Bukit Dukung	KG31	Bukit Dukung	9 Kajang Line	Rapid Rail	MRT	Kajang	17 July 2017	
Bukit Jalil	SP17	Bukit Jalil	4 Sri Petaling Line	Rapid Rail	LRT	Kuala Lumpur	11 July 1998	
Bukit Nanas	MR8	Bukit Nanas	8 KL Monorail	Rapid Rail	Monorail	Kuala Lumpur	31 August 2003	Walking distance to KJ12 Dang Wangi
BU 11	SA03	BU 11	11 Shah Alam Line	Rapid Rail	LRT	Petaling Jaya	29 June 2026	
Cahaya	AG17	Cahaya	3 Ampang Line	Rapid Rail	LRT	Ampang Jaya	16 December 1996	
Cempaka	AG16	Cempaka	3 Ampang Line	Rapid Rail	LRT	Ampang Jaya	16 December 1996	
Chan Sow Lin	AG11; SP11; PY24	Chan Sow Lin	3 Ampang Line 4 Sri Petaling Line 12 Putrajaya Line	Rapid Rail	LRT; MRT	Kuala Lumpur	16 December 1996 (LRT); 16 March 2023 (MRT)	
Cheras	SP12	Cheras	4 Sri Petaling Line	Rapid Rail	LRT	Kuala Lumpur	11 July 1998	
Chow Kit	MR10	Chow Kit	8 KL Monorail	Rapid Rail	Monorail	Kuala Lumpur	31 August 2003	
Cochrane	KG21	Cochrane	9 Kajang Line	Rapid Rail	MRT	Kuala Lumpur	17 July 2017	
Conlay	PY22	Conlay	12 Putrajaya Line	Rapid Rail	MRT	Kuala Lumpur	16 March 2023	Currently named Conlay–Kompleks Kraf under the station naming rights programme
Cyberjaya City Centre	PY40	Cyberjaya City Centre	12 Putrajaya Line	Rapid Rail	MRT	Sepang	16 March 2023	
Cyberjaya Utara	PY39	Cyberjaya Utara	12 Putrajaya Line	Rapid Rail	MRT	Sepang	16 March 2023	Currently named Cyberjaya Utara–Finexus under the station naming rights programme
Damai	KJ8	Damai	5 Kelana Jaya Line	Rapid Rail	LRT	Kuala Lumpur	1 June 1999	
Damansara Damai	PY05	Damansara Damai	12 Putrajaya Line	Rapid Rail	MRT	Petaling Jaya	16 June 2022	
Damansara Idaman	SA05		11 Shah Alam Line	Rapid Rail	LRT	Petaling Jaya	29 June 2026	
Dang Wangi	KJ12	Dang Wangi	5 Kelana Jaya Line	Rapid Rail	LRT	Kuala Lumpur	1 June 1999	Walking distance to MR8 Bukit Nanas
Dato' Keramat	KJ7	Dato' Keramat	5 Kelana Jaya Line	Rapid Rail	LRT	Kuala Lumpur	1 June 1999	
Dato' Menteri	SA12	Dato' Menteri	11 Shah Alam Line	Rapid Rail	LRT	Shah Alam	29 June 2026	
Glenmarie	KJ27; SA07	Glenmarie	5 Kelana Jaya Line 11 Shah Alam Line	Rapid Rail	LRT	Petaling Jaya	30 June 2016 (Kelana Jaya Line); 29 June 2026 (Shah Alam Line)	The Shah Alam Line part of the station is known as Glenmarie 2 There is no paid-area-to-paid-area integration. An elevated walkway connects the two lines.
Gombak	KJ1	Gombak	5 Kelana Jaya Line	Rapid Rail	LRT	Selayang	1 June 1999	
Hang Tuah	AG9; SP9; MR4	Hang Tuah	3 Ampang Line 4 Sri Petaling Line 8 KL Monorail	Rapid Rail	LRT; Monorail	Kuala Lumpur	16 December 1996 (LRT); 31 August 2003 (Monorail)	Currently named BBCC–Hang Tuah under the station naming rights programme
Hospital Kuala Lumpur	PY18	Hospital Kuala Lumpur	12 Putrajaya Line	Rapid Rail	MRT	Kuala Lumpur	16 March 2023	
Imbi	MR5	Imbi	8 KL Monorail	Rapid Rail	Monorail	Kuala Lumpur	31 August 2003	
IOI Puchong Jaya	SP24	IOI Puchong Jaya	4 Sri Petaling Line	Rapid Rail	LRT	Subang Jaya	31 March 2016	
Jalan Ipoh	PY15	Jalan Ipoh	12 Putrajaya Line	Rapid Rail	MRT	Kuala Lumpur	16 March 2023	
Jalan Kastam	KD18	Jalan Kastam	2 Tanjung Malim–Port Klang Line	KTM	Commuter rail	Klang	1995	
Jalan Meru	SA19	Jalan Meru	11 Shah Alam Line	Rapid Rail	LRT	Klang	29 June 2026	
Jalan Templer	KD05	Jalan Templer	2 Tanjung Malim–Port Klang Line	KTM	Commuter rail	Petaling Jaya	14 August 1995	
Jambatan Kota	SA20		11 Shah Alam Line	Rapid Rail	LRT	Klang	29 June 2026	
Jelatek	KJ6	Jelatek	5 Kelana Jaya Line	Rapid Rail	LRT	Ampang Jaya	1 June 1999	
Jinjang	PY11	Jinjang	12 Putrajaya Line	Rapid Rail	MRT	Kuala Lumpur	16 June 2022	
Johan Setia	SA26		11 Shah Alam Line	Rapid Rail	LRT	Klang	29 June 2026	
Kajang	KB06; KG35	Kajang	1 Batu Caves–Pulau Sebang Line 9 Kajang Line	KTM; Rapid Rail	Commuter rail MRT	Kajang	10 November 1995 (KTM Komuter); 17 July 2017 (MRT)	
Kajang 2	KB07	Kajang 2	1 Batu Caves–Pulau Sebang Line	KTM	Commuter rail	Kajang	13 March 2023	
Kampung Baru	KJ11	Kampung Baru	5 Kelana Jaya Line	Rapid Rail	LRT	Kuala Lumpur	1 June 1999	Currently named Kampung Baru–Co-opbank Pertama under the station naming rights programme
Kampung Batu	KC03; PY13	Kampung Batu	1 Batu Caves–Pulau Sebang Line 12 Putrajaya Line	KTM; Rapid Rail	Commuter rail MRT	Kuala Lumpur	April 2010 (KTM Komuter); 16 June 2022 (MRT)	
Kampung Dato Harun	KD06	Kampung Dato Harun	2 Tanjung Malim–Port Klang Line	KTM	Commuter rail	Petaling Jaya	14 August 1995	
Kampung Raja Uda	KD17	Kampung Raja Uda	2 Tanjung Malim–Port Klang Line	KTM	Commuter rail	Klang	1995	
Kampung Selamat	PY03	Kampung Selamat	12 Putrajaya Line	Rapid Rail	MRT	Petaling Jaya	16 December 2016	
Kayu Ara	SA02	Kayu Ara	11 Shah Alam Line	Rapid Rail	LRT	Petaling Jaya	29 June 2026	
Kelana Jaya	KJ24	Kelana Jaya	5 Kelana Jaya Line	Rapid Rail	LRT	Petaling Jaya	1 September 1998	
Kentonmen	PY14	Kentomen	12 Putrajaya Line	Rapid Rail	MRT	Kuala Lumpur	16 March 2023	
Kepong	KA06	Kepong	2 Tanjung Malim–Port Klang Line	KTM	Commuter rail	Kuala Lumpur	1995	
Kepong Baru	PY10	Kepong Baru	12 Putrajaya Line	Rapid Rail	MRT	Kuala Lumpur	16 June 2022	
Kepong Sentral	KA07	Kepong Sentral	2 Tanjung Malim–Port Klang Line	KTM	Commuter rail	Petaling Jaya	1 July 2006	Walking distance to PY08 Sri Damansara Timur
Kerinchi	KJ18	Kerinchi	5 Kelana Jaya Line	Rapid Rail	LRT	Kuala Lumpur	1 September 1998	
Kerjaya	SA09	Kerjaya	11 Shah Alam Line	Rapid Rail	LRT	Shah Alam	29 June 2026	
Kinrara BK 5	SP22	Kinrara BK 5	4 Sri Petaling Line	Rapid Rail	LRT	Subang Jaya	31 October 2015	
Klang	KD14	Klang	2 Tanjung Malim–Port Klang Line	KTM	Commuter rail	Klang	1995	
Klang Jaya	SA23	Klang Jaya	11 Shah Alam Line	Rapid Rail	LRT	Klang	29 June 2026	
KLCC	KJ10	KLCC	5 Kelana Jaya Line	Rapid Rail	LRT	Kuala Lumpur	1 June 1999	
KLIA T1	KE2; KT5	KLIA	6 KLIA Ekspres 7 KLIA Transit	ERL	Airport rail link	Sepang	14 April 2002 (KLIA Ekspres); 20 June 2002 (KLIA Transit)	
KLIA T2	KE3; KT6	KLIA 2	6 KLIA Ekspres 7 KLIA Transit	ERL	Airport rail link	Sepang	1 May 2014	
Kota Damansara	KG06	Kota Damansara	9 Kajang Line	Rapid Rail	MRT	Petaling Jaya	16 December 2016	Currently named Kota Damansara–Thomson Hospital under the station naming rights programme
Kuala Kubu Bharu	KA14	Kuala Kubu Bharu	2 Tanjung Malim–Port Klang Line	KTM	Commuter rail	Hulu Selangor	5 January 2008	
Kuala Lumpur	KA02	Kuala Lumpur	1 Batu Caves–Pulau Sebang Line 2 Tanjung Malim–Port Klang Line	KTM	Commuter rail	Kuala Lumpur	14 August 1995	
Kuala Lumpur Sentral (KL Sentral)	KA01; KS01; KJ15; KE1; KT1	KL Sentral	1 Batu Caves–Pulau Sebang Line 2 Tanjung Malim–Port Klang Line 5 Kelana Jaya Line 6 KLIA Ekspres 7 KLIA Transit 10 KL Sentral–Terminal Skypark Line	KTM; Rapid Rail; ERL	Airport rail link Commuter rail LRT	Kuala Lumpur	2001 (Kelana Jaya Line, Batu Caves-Pulau Sebang Line, Tanjung Malim-Port Klang Line); 14 April 2002 (KLIA Ekspres); 20 June 2002 (KLIA Transit); 1 May 2018 (KL Sentral-Skypark Line)	There is no paid-area-to-paid-area integration between the different operators in KL Sentral. Walkways to MR1 KL Sentral Monorail and KG15 Muzium Negara; The LRT part of this station is currently named as KL Sentral–redONE under the station naming rights programme
Kuala Lumpur Sentral (KL Sentral) Monorail	MR1	KL Sentral Monorail	8 KL Monorail	Rapid Rail	Monorail	Kuala Lumpur	31 August 2003	Walkways to KA01 KS01 KJ15 KE1 KT1 KL Sentral and KG15 Muzium Negara
Kuang	KA09	Kuang	2 Tanjung Malim–Port Klang Line	KTM	Commuter rail	Selayang	1995	
Kuchai	PY27	Kuchai	12 Putrajaya Line	Rapid Rail	MRT	Kuala Lumpur	16 March 2023	
Kwasa Damansara	KG04; PY01	Kwasa Damansara	9 Kajang Line 12 Putrajaya Line	Rapid Rail	MRT	Shah Alam	16 December 2016 (Kajang Line); 16 June 2022 (Putrajaya Line)	
Kwasa Sentral	KG05	Kwasa Sentral	9 Kajang Line	Rapid Rail	MRT	Shah Alam	16 December 2016	
Labu	KB12	Labu	1 Batu Caves–Pulau Sebang Line	KTM	Commuter rail	Seremban	1995	
Lembah Subang	KJ25	Lembah Subang	5 Kelana Jaya Line	Rapid Rail	LRT	Kuala Lumpur	30 June 2016	
Maharajalela	MR3	Maharajalela	8 KL Monorail	Rapid Rail	Monorail	Kuala Lumpur	31 August 2003	
Maluri	AG13; KG22	Maluri	3 Ampang Line 9 Kajang Line	Rapid Rail	LRT; MRT	Kuala Lumpur	16 December 1996 (LRT); 17 July 2017 (MRT)	The MRT part of the station is currently named Maluri–AEON under the station naming rights programme
Masjid Jamek	AG7; SP7; KJ13	Masjid Jamek	3 Ampang Line 4 Sri Petaling Line 5 Kelana Jaya Line	Rapid Rail	LRT	Kuala Lumpur	16 December 1996 (Ampang & Sri Petaling Lines); 1 June 1999 (Kelana Jaya Line)	
Medan Tuanku	MR9	Medan Tuanku	8 KL Monorail	Rapid Rail	Monorail	Kuala Lumpur	31 August 2003	
Mentari	SB2	Mentari	B1 BRT Sunway Line	Rapid Bus	BRT	Petaling Jaya	2 June 2015	
Merdeka	KG17	Merdeka	9 Kajang Line	Rapid Rail	MRT	Kuala Lumpur	17 July 2017	Integrated (paid-area-to-paid-area) link to AG8 SP8 Plaza Rakyat. Currently named Merdeka–Maybank under the station naming rights programme
Metro Prima	PY09	Metro Prima	12 Putrajaya Line	Rapid Rail	MRT	Kuala Lumpur	16 June 2022	
Mid Valley	KB01	Mid Valley	1 Batu Caves–Pulau Sebang Line	KTM	Commuter rail	Kuala Lumpur	23 August 2004	
Miharja	AG12	Miharja	3 Ampang Line	Rapid Rail	LRT	Kuala Lumpur	16 December 1996	
Muhibbah	SP20	Muhibbah	4 Sri Petaling Line	Rapid Rail	LRT	Kuala Lumpur	31 October 2015	
Mutiara Damansara	KG08	Mutiara Damansara	9 Kajang Line	Rapid Rail	MRT	Petaling Jaya	16 December 2016	
Muzium Negara	KG15	Muzium Negara	9 Kajang Line	Rapid Rail	MRT	Kuala Lumpur	17 July 2017	Walkways to KA01 KS01 KJ15 KE1 KT1 KL Sentral and MR1 KL Sentral Monorail
Nilai	KB11	Nilai	1 Batu Caves–Pulau Sebang Line	KTM	Commuter rail	Seremban	1995	
Padang Jawa	KD12	Padang Jawa	2 Tanjung Malim–Port Klang Line	KTM	Commuter rail	Shah Alam	1995	
Pandan Indah	AG15	Pandan Indah	3 Ampang Line	Rapid Rail	LRT	Ampang Jaya	16 December 1996	
Pandan Jaya	AG14	Pandan Jaya	3 Ampang Line	Rapid Rail	LRT	Ampang Jaya	16 December 1996	
Pantai Dalam	KD03	Pantai Dalam	2 Tanjung Malim–Port Klang Line	KTM	Commuter rail	Kuala Lumpur	14 August 1995	
Pasar Klang	SA18	Pasar Klang	11 Shah Alam Line	Rapid Rail	LRT	Klang	29 June 2026	
Pasar Seni	KJ14; KG16	Pasar Seni	5 Kelana Jaya Line 9 Kajang Line	Rapid Rail	LRT; MRT	Kuala Lumpur	1 September 1998 (LRT); 17 July 2017 (MRT)	Walking distance to KA02 Kuala Lumpur
Persiaran KLCC	PY21	Persiaran KLCC	12 Putrajaya Line	Rapid Rail	MRT	Kuala Lumpur	16 March 2023	
Petaling	KD04	Petaling	2 Tanjung Malim–Port Klang Line	KTM	Commuter rail	Kuala Lumpur	14 August 1995	
Port Klang (Pelabuhan Klang)	KD19	Port Klang	2 Tanjung Malim–Port Klang Line	KTM	Commuter rail	Klang	1995	
Phileo Damansara	KG12	Phileo Damansara	9 Kajang Line	Rapid Rail	MRT	Kuala Lumpur	16 December 2016	
Plaza Rakyat	AG8; SP8	Plaza Rakyat	3 Ampang Line 4 Sri Petaling Line	Rapid Rail	LRT	Kuala Lumpur	16 December 1996	Integrated (paid-area-to-paid-area) link to KG17 Merdeka
Puchong Perdana	SP28		4 Sri Petaling Line	Rapid Rail	LRT	Subang Jaya	30 June 2016	
Puchong Prima	SP29	Puchong Prima	4 Sri Petaling Line	Rapid Rail	LRT	Subang Jaya	30 June 2016	
Pudu	AG10; SP10	Pudu	3 Ampang Line 4 Sri Petaling Line	Rapid Rail	LRT	Kuala Lumpur	16 December 1996	
Pulau Sebang/Tampin	KB18	Pulau Sebang/Tampin	1 Batu Caves–Pulau Sebang Line	KTM	Commuter rail	Alor Gajah	10 October 2015	
Pusat Bandar Damansara	KG13	PBD	9 Kajang Line	Rapid Rail	MRT	Kuala Lumpur	16 December 2016	Currently named Pavilion Damansara Heights–Pusat Bandar Damansara under the station naming rights programme
Pusat Bandar Puchong	SP25	Pusat Bandar Puchong	4 Sri Petaling Line	Rapid Rail	LRT	Subang Jaya	31 March 2016	
Putra	KA04	Putra	1 Batu Caves–Pulau Sebang Line 2 Tanjung Malim–Port Klang Line	KTM	Commuter rail	Kuala Lumpur	1995	
Putra Heights	SP31; KJ37	Putra Heights	4 Sri Petaling Line 5 Kelana Jaya Line	Rapid Rail	LRT	Subang Jaya	30 June 2016	
Putra Permai	PY37	Putra Permai	12 Putrajaya Line	Rapid Rail	MRT	Subang Jaya	16 March 2023	
Putrajaya Sentral	KT3; PY41	Putrajaya Sentral	7 KLIA Transit 12 Putrajaya Line	ERL; Rapid Rail	Airport rail link MRT	Putrajaya	20 June 2002 (ERL); 16 March 2023 (MRT)	The KLIA Transit part of this station is known as Putrajaya & Cyberjaya
PWTC	AG4; SP4	PWTC	3 Ampang Line 4 Sri Petaling Line	Rapid Rail	LRT	Kuala Lumpur	11 July 1998	
Raja Chulan	MR7	Raja Chulan	8 KL Monorail	Rapid Rail	Monorail	Kuala Lumpur	31 August 2003	
Raja Uda	PY19	Raja Uda	12 Putrajaya Line	Rapid Rail	MRT	Kuala Lumpur	16 March 2023	Currently named Raja Uda–Institut Jantung Negara under the station naming rights programme
Rasa	KA13	Rasa	2 Tanjung Malim–Port Klang Line	KTM	Commuter rail	Hulu Selangor	21 April 2007	
Rawang	KA10	Rawang	2 Tanjung Malim–Port Klang Line	KTM	Commuter rail	Selayang	1995	
Rembau	KB17	Rembau	1 Batu Caves–Pulau Sebang Line	KTM	Commuter rail	Rembau	10 October 2015	
Salak Selatan (KTM)	KB03	Salak Selatan KTM	1 Batu Caves–Pulau Sebang Line	KTM	Commuter rail	Kuala Lumpur	1995	
Salak Selatan (LRT)	SP13	Salak Selatan LRT	4 Sri Petaling Line	Rapid Rail	LRT	Kuala Lumpur	11 July 1998	
Salak Tinggi	KT4	Salak Tinggi	7 KLIA Transit	ERL	Airport rail link	Sepang	20 June 2002	
Segambut	KA05	Segambut	2 Tanjung Malim–Port Klang Line	KTM	Commuter rail	Kuala Lumpur	1995	
Segambut Utara	KA05A	Segambut	2 Tanjung Malim–Port Klang Line	KTM	Commuter rail	Kuala Lumpur	11 May 2026	
Seksyen 7 Shah Alam	SA15	Seksyen 7 Shah Alam	11 Shah Alam Line	Rapid Rail	LRT	Shah Alam	29 June 2026	
Semantan	KG14	Semantan	9 Kajang Line	Rapid Rail	MRT	Kuala Lumpur	16 December 2016	
Senawang	KB15	Senawang	1 Batu Caves–Pulau Sebang Line	KTM	Commuter rail	Seremban	14 May 2011	
Sentul (KTM)	KC01	Sentul	1 Batu Caves–Pulau Sebang Line	KTM	Commuter rail	Kuala Lumpur	1995	
Sentul (LRT)	AG2; SP2	Sentul	3 Ampang Line 4 Sri Petaling Line	Rapid Rail	LRT	Kuala Lumpur	11 July 1998	
Sentul Barat	PY16	Sentul Barat	12 Putrajaya Line	Rapid Rail	MRT	Kuala Lumpur	16 March 2023	
Sentul Timur	AG1; SP1	Sentul Timur	3 Ampang Line 4 Sri Petaling Line	Rapid Rail	LRT	Kuala Lumpur	11 July 1998	
Seputeh	KB02	Seputeh	1 Batu Caves–Pulau Sebang Line	KTM	Commuter rail	Kuala Lumpur	1995	
Serdang	KB05	Serdang	1 Batu Caves–Pulau Sebang Line	KTM	Commuter rail	Subang Jaya	1995	
Serdang Jaya	PY33	Serdang Jaya	12 Putrajaya Line	Rapid Rail	MRT	Subang Jaya	16 March 2023	
Serdang Raya Selatan	PY32	Serdang Raya Selatan	12 Putrajaya Line	Rapid Rail	MRT	Subang Jaya	16 March 2023	
Serdang Raya Utara	PY31	Serdang Raya Utara	12 Putrajaya Line	Rapid Rail	MRT	Subang Jaya	16 March 2023	
Seremban	KB14	Seremban	1 Batu Caves–Pulau Sebang Line	KTM	Commuter rail	Seremban	1995	
Serendah	KA11	Serendah	2 Tanjung Malim–Port Klang Line	KTM	Commuter rail	Hulu Selangor	21 April 2007	
Seri Andalas	SA22	Seri Andalas	11 Shah Alam Line	Rapid Rail	LRT	Klang	29 June 2026	
Seri Setia	KD07	Seri Setia	2 Tanjung Malim–Port Klang Line	KTM	Commuter rail	Petaling Jaya	14 August 1995	
Setia Jaya (Sunway-Setia Jaya)	KD08; SB1	Setia Jaya	2 Tanjung Malim–Port Klang Line B1 BRT Sunway Line	KTM; Rapid Bus	Commuter rail BRT	Petaling Jaya	14 August 1995 (KTM Komuter); 2 June 2015 (BRT)	The BRT part of the station is known as Sunway-Setia Jaya.
Setiawangsa	KJ5	Setiawangsa	5 Kelana Jaya Line	Rapid Rail	LRT	Ampang Jaya	1 June 1999	
Shah Alam	KD11	Shah Alam	2 Tanjung Malim–Port Klang Line	KTM	Commuter rail	Shah Alam	14 August 1995	
South Quay-USJ 1	SB6	Sunway Lagoon	B1 BRT Sunway Line	Rapid Bus	BRT	Subang Jaya	2 June 2015	
Sri Damansara Barat	PY06	Sri Damansara Barat	12 Putrajaya Line	Rapid Rail	MRT	Petaling Jaya	16 June 2022	
Sri Damansara Sentral	PY07	Sri Damansara Sentral	12 Putrajaya Line	Rapid Rail	MRT	Petaling Jaya	16 June 2022	
Sri Damansara Timur	PY08	Sri Damansara Timur	12 Putrajaya Line	Rapid Rail	MRT	Petaling Jaya	16 June 2022	Walking distance to KA07 Kepong Sentral
Sri Delima	PY12	Sri Delima	12 Putrajaya Line	Rapid Rail	MRT	Kuala Lumpur	16 June 2022	
Sri Petaling	SP18	Sri Petaling	4 Sri Petaling Line	Rapid Rail	LRT	Kuala Lumpur	11 July 1998	
Sri Rampai	KJ4	Sri Rampai	5 Kelana Jaya Line	Rapid Rail	LRT	Kuala Lumpur	24 December 2010	
Sri Raya	KG28	Sri Raya	9 Kajang Line	Rapid Rail	MRT	Kajang	17 July 2017	
SS15	KJ29	SS15	5 Kelana Jaya Line	Rapid Rail	LRT	Subang Jaya	30 June 2016	
SS18	KJ30	SS18	5 Kelana Jaya Line	Rapid Rail	LRT	Subang Jaya	30 June 2016	
Stadium Kajang	KG34	Stadium Kajang	9 Kajang Line	Rapid Rail	MRT	Kajang	17 July 2017	
Stadium Shah Alam	SA10	Stadium Shah Alam	11 Shah Alam Line	Rapid Rail	LRT	Shah Alam	29 June 2026	
Subang	SA06	Subang	11 Shah Alam Line	Rapid Rail	LRT	Petaling Jaya	29 June 2026	
Subang Alam	KJ36	Subang Alam	5 Kelana Jaya Line	Rapid Rail	LRT	Shah Alam	30 June 2016	
Subang Jaya	KD09; KS02; KJ28	Subang Jaya	2 Tanjung Malim–Port Klang Line 5 Kelana Jaya Line 10 KL Sentral–Terminal Skypark Line	KTM; Rapid Rail	Commuter rail LRT; Airport rail link	Subang Jaya	14 August 1995 (Tanjung Malim-Port Klang Line); 30 June 2016 (LRT); 1 May 2001 (KL Sentral-Skypark Line)	
Sultan Ismail	AG5; SP5	Sultan Ismail	3 Ampang Line 4 Sri Petaling Line	Rapid Rail	LRT	Kuala Lumpur	16 December 1996	
Sungai Besi	SP16; PY29	Sungai Besi	4 Sri Petaling Line 12 Putrajaya Line	Rapid Rail	LRT; MRT	Kuala Lumpur	11 July 1998 (LRT); 16 March 2023 (MRT)	
Sungai Buloh	KA08; PY04	Sungai Buloh	2 Tanjung Malim–Port Klang Line 12 Putrajaya Line	KTM; Rapid Rail	Commuter rail MRT	Selayang	1995 (KTM Komuter); 16 December 2016 (MRT)	
Sungai Gadut	KB16	Sungai Gadut	1 Batu Caves–Pulau Sebang Line	KTM	Commuter rail	Seremban	14 May 2011	
Sungai Jernih	KG33	Sungai Jernih	9 Kajang Line	Rapid Rail	MRT	Kajang	17 July 2017	
SunMed	SB4	SunMed	B1 BRT Sunway Line	Rapid Bus	BRT	Subang Jaya	2 June 2015	
SunU-Monash	SB5	SunU-Monash	B1 BRT Sunway Line	Rapid Bus	BRT	Subang Jaya	2 June 2015	
Sunway Lagoon	SB3	Sunway Lagoon	B1 BRT Sunway Line	Rapid Bus	BRT	Subang Jaya	2 June 2015	
Surian	KG07	Surian	9 Kajang Line	Rapid Rail	MRT	Petaling Jaya	16 December 2016	Currently named Surian–IOI Mall Damansara under the station naming rights programme
Taipan	KJ32	Taipan	5 Kelana Jaya Line	Rapid Rail	LRT	Subang Jaya	30 June 2016	
Taman Bahagia	KJ23	Taman Bahagia	5 Kelana Jaya Line	Rapid Rail	LRT	Kuala Lumpur	1 September 1998	
Taman Connaught	KG26	Taman Connaught	9 Kajang Line	Rapid Rail	MRT	Kuala Lumpur	17 July 2017	
Taman Equine	PY36	Taman Equine	12 Putrajaya Line	Rapid Rail	MRT	Subang Jaya	16 March 2023	
Taman Jaya	KJ20	Taman Jaya	5 Kelana Jaya Line	Rapid Rail	LRT	Kuala Lumpur	1 September 1998	
Taman Melati	KJ2	Taman Melati	5 Kelana Jaya Line	Rapid Rail	LRT	Selayang	1 June 1999	
Taman Midah	KG24	Taman Midah	9 Kajang Line	Rapid Rail	MRT	Kuala Lumpur	17 July 2017	
Taman Mutiara	KG25	Taman Mutiara	9 Kajang Line	Rapid Rail	MRT	Kuala Lumpur	17 July 2017	
Taman Naga Emas	PY28	Taman Naga Emas	12 Putrajaya Line	Rapid Rail	MRT	Kuala Lumpur	16 March 2023	
Taman Paramount	KJ22	Taman Paramount	5 Kelana Jaya Line	Rapid Rail	LRT	Kuala Lumpur	1 September 1998	
Taman Perindustrian Puchong	SP26	Taman Perindustrian Puchong	4 Sri Petaling Line	Rapid Rail	LRT	Subang Jaya	31 March 2016	
Taman Pertama	KG23	Taman Pertama	9 Kajang Line	Rapid Rail	MRT	Kuala Lumpur	17 July 2017	
Taman Selatan	SA21		11 Shah Alam Line	Rapid Rail	LRT	Klang	29 June 2026	
Taman Suntex	KG27	Taman Suntex	9 Kajang Line	Rapid Rail	MRT	Kajang	17 July 2017	
Taman Tun Dr Ismail (TTDI)	KG10	Taman Tun Dr Ismail	9 Kajang Line	Rapid Rail	MRT	Kuala Lumpur	16 December 2016	Currently named Taman Tun Dr Ismail–Deloitte under the station naming rights programme
Taman Wahyu	KC04	Taman Wahyu	1 Batu Caves–Pulau Sebang Line	KTM	Commuter rail	Kuala Lumpur	April 2010	
Tanjung Malim	KA15	Tanjung Malim	2 Tanjung Malim–Port Klang Line	KTM	Commuter rail	Tanjung Malim	1 June 2008	
Teluk Gadong	KD16	Teluk Gadong	2 Tanjung Malim–Port Klang Line	KTM	Commuter rail	Klang	1995	
Teluk Pulai	KD15	Teluk Pulai	2 Tanjung Malim–Port Klang Line	KTM	Commuter rail	Klang	1995	
Terminal Skypark	KS03	Terminal Skypark	10 KL Sentral–Terminal Skypark Line	KTM	Airport rail link	Subang Jaya	1 May 2018	
Tiroi	KB13	Tiroi	1 Batu Caves–Pulau Sebang Line	KTM	Commuter rail	Seremban	1995	
Titiwangsa	AG3; SP3; MR11; PY17	Titiwangsa	3 Ampang Line 4 Sri Petaling Line 8 KL Monorail 12 Putrajaya Line	Rapid Rail	LRT; Monorail; MRT	Kuala Lumpur	11 July 1998 (LRT); 31 August 2003 (Monorail); 16 March 2023 (MRT)	
Tun Razak Exchange (TRX)	KG20; PY23	Tun Razak Exchange	9 Kajang Line 12 Putrajaya Line	Rapid Rail	MRT	Kuala Lumpur	17 July 2017 (Kajang Line); 16 March 2023 (Putrajaya Line)	
Tun Sambanthan	MR2	Tun Sambanthan	8 KL Monorail	Rapid Rail	Monorail	Kuala Lumpur	31 August 2003	
UiTM Shah Alam	SA14	UiTM Shah Alam	11 Shah Alam Line	Rapid Rail	LRT	Shah Alam	29 June 2026	
Universiti	KJ19	Universiti	5 Kelana Jaya Line	Rapid Rail	LRT	Kuala Lumpur	1 September 1998	
UKM	KB08	UKM	1 Batu Caves–Pulau Sebang Line	KTM	Commuter rail	Kuala Lumpur	1995	
UPM	PY34	UPM	12 Putrajaya Line	Rapid Rail	MRT	Subang Jaya	16 March 2023	
USJ 7	KJ31; SB7	USJ7	5 Kelana Jaya Line B1 BRT Sunway Line	Rapid Rail; Rapid Bus	LRT; BRT	Subang Jaya	30 June 2016 (LRT); 2 June 2015 (BRT)	
USJ 21	KJ34	USJ 21	5 Kelana Jaya Line	Rapid Rail	LRT	Subang Jaya	30 June 2016	
Wangsa Maju	KJ3	Wangsa Maju	5 Kelana Jaya Line	Rapid Rail	LRT	Kuala Lumpur	1 June 1999	
Wawasan	KJ33	Wawasan	5 Kelana Jaya Line	Rapid Rail	LRT	Subang Jaya	30 June 2016	
16 Sierra	PY38	16 Sierra	12 Putrajaya Line	Rapid Rail	MRT	Sepang	16 March 2023	

== List of stations according to lines ==
Railway lines around Klang Valley

Lines	Type	Termini	Number of Stations	Length (km)	Owner	Operator	Status
1 Batu Caves–Pulau Sebang Line	Commuter rail	Batu Caves	27	135.6	KTM	KTM	Operational
1 Batu Caves–Pulau Sebang Line	Commuter rail	Pulau Sebang/Tampin	27	135.6	KTM	KTM	Operational
2 Tanjung Malim–Port Klang Line	Commuter rail	Tanjung Malim	34	127.5	KTM	KTM	Operational
2 Tanjung Malim–Port Klang Line	Commuter rail	Port Klang	34	127.5	KTM	KTM	Operational
3 Ampang Line	LRT	Sentul Timur	18	15	Prasarana Malaysia	Rapid Rail	Operational
3 Ampang Line	LRT	Ampang	18	15	Prasarana Malaysia	Rapid Rail	Operational
4 Sri Petaling Line	LRT	Sentul Timur	29	37.6	Prasarana Malaysia	Rapid Rail	Operational
4 Sri Petaling Line	LRT	Putra Heights	29	37.6	Prasarana Malaysia	Rapid Rail	Operational
5 Kelana Jaya Line	LRT	Gombak	37	46.4	Prasarana Malaysia	Rapid Rail	Operational
5 Kelana Jaya Line	LRT	Putra Heights	37	46.4	Prasarana Malaysia	Rapid Rail	Operational
6 KLIA Ekspres	Express Airport rail link	KL Sentral	3	59.1	Express Rail Link (ERL)	ERL	Operational
6 KLIA Ekspres	Express Airport rail link	KLIA T2	3	59.1	Express Rail Link (ERL)	ERL	Operational
7 KLIA Transit	Airport rail link	KL Sentral	6	59.1	Express Rail Link (ERL)	ERL	Operational
7 KLIA Transit	Airport rail link	KLIA T2	6	59.1	Express Rail Link (ERL)	ERL	Operational
8 KL Monorail	Monorail	KL Sentral	11	8.6	Prasarana Malaysia	Rapid Rail	Operational
8 KL Monorail	Monorail	Titiwangsa	11	8.6	Prasarana Malaysia	Rapid Rail	Operational
9 Kajang Line	MRT	Kwasa Damansara	29	46	MRT Corp	Rapid Rail	Operational
9 Kajang Line	MRT	Kajang	29	46	MRT Corp	Rapid Rail	Operational
10 KL Sentral–Terminal Skypark Line	Limited express airport rail link	KL Sentral	3	24.5	KTM	KTM	Suspended
10 KL Sentral–Terminal Skypark Line	Limited express airport rail link	Terminal Skypark	3	24.5	KTM	KTM	Suspended
11 Shah Alam Line	LRT	Bandar Utama	20	37.8	Prasarana Malaysia	Rapid Rail	Operational
11 Shah Alam Line	LRT	Johan Setia	20	37.8	Prasarana Malaysia	Rapid Rail	Operational
12 Putrajaya Line	MRT	Kwasa Damansara	36	57.7	MRT Corp	Rapid Rail	Operational
12 Putrajaya Line	MRT	Putrajaya Sentral	36	57.7	MRT Corp	Rapid Rail	Operational
13 Circle Line	MRT	Loop line	33	51.6	MRT Corp	Rapid Rail	Pre-construction
B1 BRT Sunway Line	Bus rapid transit (BRT)	Sunway-Setia Jaya	7	5.6	Prasarana Malaysia	Rapid Bus	Operational
B1 BRT Sunway Line	Bus rapid transit (BRT)	USJ 7	7	5.6	Prasarana Malaysia	Rapid Bus	Operational
Total			216	593.3 (Note: Not including MRT Circle Line. The Ampang Line and Sri Petaling share the route/tracks between Chan Sow Lin and Sentul Timur; combined length of both lines is 45.1km. The combined length of the KTM lines is 287km.)			

Legend
Interchange station (paid link)

Connecting station (unpaid link)

Connected with airport

Connected with intercity rail service

Connected with long-distance bus terminal

Rail line denoted in Italics - Under construction

Station name denoted in Italics - Provisioned/future station

=== Commuter rail lines ===
The KTM Komuter has two main lines, namely the Batu Caves–Pulau Sebang Line and the Tanjung Malim–Port Klang Line. These two lines begin separately, but share a common route between Putra and KL Sentral stations, before splitting again and heading towards their respective termini. This effectively makes Putra, Bank Negara, Kuala Lumpur and KL Sentral interchange stations between the two lines. The station codes are given based on the portion of the lines the stations are on. (Station code legend: K-Komuter, A-Tanjung Malim route, B-Pulau Sebang/Tampin route, C-Batu Caves route, D-Port Klang route)

Station Code	Station Name	Interchanges/Connections	Opening	District/City	State/Territory
1 - KTM Batu Caves-Pulau Sebang Line
KC05	Batu Caves		29 July 2010	Gombak	Selangor
KC04	Taman Wahyu		29 July 2010	Kuala Lumpur	Federal Territories
KC03	Kampung Batu	12 Putrajaya Line	29 July 2010	Kuala Lumpur	Federal Territories
KC02	Batu Kentonmen		29 July 2010	Kuala Lumpur	Federal Territories
KC01	Sentul		1995	Kuala Lumpur	Federal Territories
KA04	Putra	2 Tanjung Malim–Port Klang Line (PWTC); 3 Ampang Line; 4 Sri Petaling Line	1995	Kuala Lumpur	Federal Territories
KA03	Bank Negara	2 Tanjung Malim–Port Klang Line (Bandaraya); 3 Ampang Line; 4 Sri Petaling Line	1995	Kuala Lumpur	Federal Territories
KA02	Kuala Lumpur	2 Tanjung Malim–Port Klang Line 5 Kelana Jaya Line (Pasar Seni); 9 Kajang Line (Pasar Seni); KTM ETS	1995	Kuala Lumpur	Federal Territories
KA01	KL Sentral	2 Tanjung Malim–Port Klang Line 5 Kelana Jaya Line; 6 KLIA Ekspres; 7 KLIA Transit; 8 KL Monorail (Note: KL Monorail's KL Sentral station is across the busy Jalan Tun Sambanthan, and it is connected with the overhead bridge that integrates the station with the new retails shopping complex, NU Sentral, and other lines in KL Sentral main hub.); 9 Kajang Line (Muzium Negara); 10 KL Sentral–Terminal Skypark Line; KTM ETS	16 April 2001	Kuala Lumpur	Federal Territories
KB01	Mid Valley	(Abdullah Hukum) (Note: Connection between Abdullah Hukum station and Mid Valley station is possible via a pedestrian bridge across the Klang River, through KL Eco City Mall.); 2 Tanjung Malim–Port Klang Line; 5 Kelana Jaya Line	23 August 2004	Kuala Lumpur	Federal Territories
KB02	Seputeh		1995	Kuala Lumpur	Federal Territories
KB03	Salak Selatan		1995	Kuala Lumpur	Federal Territories
KB04	Bandar Tasik Selatan	4 Sri Petaling Line; 7 KLIA Transit; KTM ETS; Southern Integrated Terminal (TBS)	1995	Kuala Lumpur	Federal Territories
KB05	Serdang		1995	Subang Jaya	Selangor
KB06	Kajang	9 Kajang Line; KTM ETS	1995	Hulu Langat	Selangor
KB07	Kajang 2		13 March 2023	Hulu Langat	Selangor
KB08	UKM		1995	Hulu Langat	Selangor
KB09	Bangi		1995	Hulu Langat	Selangor
KB10	Batang Benar		1995	Seremban	Negeri Sembilan
KB11	Nilai		1995	Seremban	Negeri Sembilan
KB12	Labu		1995	Seremban	Negeri Sembilan
KB13	Tiroi		1995	Seremban	Negeri Sembilan
KB14	Seremban	KTM ETS	1995	Seremban	Negeri Sembilan
KB15	Senawang		14 May 2011	Seremban	Negeri Sembilan
KB16	Sungai Gadut		14 May 2011	Seremban	Negeri Sembilan
KB17	Rembau		30 August 2013	Rembau	Negeri Sembilan
KB18	Pulau Sebang/Tampin	KTM ETS	10 October 2015	Alor Gajah	Malacca
2 - KTM Tanjung Malim-Port Klang Line
KA15	Tanjung Malim	KTM ETS	1 June 2009	Muallim	Perak
KA14	Kuala Kubu Bharu		5 January 2008	Hulu Selangor	Selangor
KA13	Rasa		21 April 2007	Hulu Selangor	Selangor
KA12	Batang Kali	KTM ETS	21 April 2007	Hulu Selangor	Selangor
KA11	Serendah		21 April 2007	Hulu Selangor	Selangor
KA10	Rawang	KTM ETS	1995	Gombak	Selangor
KA09	Kuang		1995	Gombak	Selangor
KA08	Sungai Buloh	12 Putrajaya Line; KTM ETS	1995	Petaling Jaya	Selangor
KA07	Kepong Sentral	12 Putrajaya Line (Sri Damansara Timur); KTM ETS	1 July 2006	Petaling Jaya	Selangor
KA06	Kepong		1995	Kuala Lumpur	Federal Territories
KA05A	Segambut Utara		11 May 2026	Kuala Lumpur	Federal Territories
KA05	Segambut		1995	Kuala Lumpur	Federal Territories
KA04	Putra	1 Batu Caves–Pulau Sebang Line (PWTC); 3 Ampang Line; 4 Sri Petaling Line	1995	Kuala Lumpur	Federal Territories
KA03	Bank Negara	1 Batu Caves–Pulau Sebang Line (Bandaraya); 3 Ampang Line; 4 Sri Petaling Line	1995	Kuala Lumpur	Federal Territories
KA02	Kuala Lumpur	1 Batu Caves–Pulau Sebang Line 5 Kelana Jaya Line (Pasar Seni); 9 Kajang Line (Pasar Seni); KTM ETS	1995	Kuala Lumpur	Federal Territories
KA01	KL Sentral	1 Batu Caves–Pulau Sebang Line 5 Kelana Jaya Line; 6 KLIA Ekspres; 7 KLIA Transit; 8 KL Monorail; 9 Kajang Line (Muzium Negara); 10 KL Sentral–Terminal Skypark Line; KTM ETS	16 April 2001	Kuala Lumpur	Federal Territories
KD01	Abdullah Hukum	5 Kelana Jaya Line; 1 Batu Caves–Pulau Sebang Line (Mid Valley)	28 October 2018	Kuala Lumpur	Federal Territories
KD02	Angkasapuri		1995	Kuala Lumpur	Federal Territories
KD03	Pantai Dalam	13 Circle Line	1995	Kuala Lumpur	Federal Territories
KD04	Petaling		1995	Petaling Jaya	Selangor
KD05	Jalan Templer		1995	Petaling Jaya	Selangor
KD06	Kampung Dato Harun		1995	Petaling Jaya	Selangor
KD07	Seri Setia		1995	Petaling Jaya	Selangor
KD08	Setia Jaya	B1 BRT Sunway Line (Sunway-Setia Jaya)	1995	Petaling Jaya	Selangor
KD09	Subang Jaya	5 Kelana Jaya Line; 10 KL Sentral–Terminal Skypark Line	1995	Subang Jaya	Selangor
KD10	Batu Tiga		1995	Shah Alam	Selangor
KD11	Shah Alam		1995	Shah Alam	Selangor
KD12	Padang Jawa		1995	Shah Alam	Selangor
KD13	Bukit Badak		1995	Klang	Selangor
KD14	Klang		1995	Klang	Selangor
KD15	Teluk Pulai		1995	Klang	Selangor
KD16	Teluk Gadong		1995	Klang	Selangor
KD17	Kampung Raja Uda		1995	Klang	Selangor
KD18	Jalan Kastam		1995	Klang	Selangor
KD19	Port Klang		1995	Klang	Selangor

=== Light rapid transit (LRT) lines ===
There are four LRT lines currently operating in the Klang Valley, namely the Ampang Line, Sri Petaling Line, Kelana Jaya Line and Shah Alam Line. The Shah Alam Line, which was proposed in 2015, is the latest LRT to be launched, officially opened on 29 June 2026.

The Ampang and Sri Petaling Lines operate as a single LRT system. They share a common route from Sentul Timur station to Chan Sow Lin station, therefore, all stations on this route act as interchange stations between both the lines. After Chan Sow Lin, the lines split toward their respective termini, the Ampang Line at Ampang and the Sri Petaling Line at Putra Heights.

The Kelana Jaya Line starts at Gombak in the north, passing through the city centre where it meets and interchanges with the LRT Ampang and Sri Petaling Lines at Masjid Jamek, towards Subang Jaya and Shah Alam where it interchanges with the Shah Alam Line at Glenmarie, and terminates at Putra Heights where it meets the Sri Petaling Line again.

The Shah Alam Line runs on an east to west route, starting at Bandar Utama and travels through Petaling Jaya, Shah Alam, and Klang before terminating at Johan Setia. It is the first rail transit line in the Klang Valley Integrated Transit System to be situated completely outside the borders of Kuala Lumpur.

Station Code	Station Name	Interchanges/Connections	Opening	District/City	State/Territory
3 - LRT Ampang Line
AG1	Sentul Timur	4 Sri Petaling Line	6 December 1998	Kuala Lumpur	Federal Territories
AG2	Sentul	4 Sri Petaling Line	6 December 1998	Kuala Lumpur	Federal Territories
AG3	Titiwangsa	4 Sri Petaling Line; 8 KL Monorail; 12 Putrajaya Line; 13 Circle Line	6 December 1998	Kuala Lumpur	Federal Territories
AG4	PWTC	4 Sri Petaling Line (Putra); 1 Batu Caves–Pulau Sebang Line; 2 Tanjung Malim–Port Klang Line	6 December 1998	Kuala Lumpur	Federal Territories
AG5	Sultan Ismail	4 Sri Petaling Line 8 KL Monorail (Medan Tuanku)	16 December 1996	Kuala Lumpur	Federal Territories
AG6	Bandaraya–UOB	4 Sri Petaling Line (Bank Negara); 1 Batu Caves–Pulau Sebang Line; 2 Tanjung Malim–Port Klang Line	16 December 1996	Kuala Lumpur	Federal Territories
AG7	Masjid Jamek	4 Sri Petaling Line; 5 Kelana Jaya Line	16 December 1996	Kuala Lumpur	Federal Territories
AG8	Plaza Rakyat	4 Sri Petaling Line; 9 Kajang Line (Merdeka)	16 December 1996	Kuala Lumpur	Federal Territories
AG9	BBCC–Hang Tuah	4 Sri Petaling Line; 8 KL Monorail	16 December 1996	Kuala Lumpur	Federal Territories
AG10	Pudu	4 Sri Petaling Line	16 December 1996	Kuala Lumpur	Federal Territories
AG11	Chan Sow Lin	4 Sri Petaling Line; 12 Putrajaya Line	16 December 1996	Kuala Lumpur	Federal Territories
AG12	Miharja		16 December 1996	Kuala Lumpur	Federal Territories
AG13	Maluri	9 Kajang Line	16 December 1996	Kuala Lumpur	Federal Territories
AG14	Pandan Jaya		16 December 1996	Ampang	Selangor
AG15	Pandan Indah	13 Circle Line	16 December 1996	Ampang	Selangor
AG16	Cempaka		16 December 1996	Ampang	Selangor
AG17	Cahaya		16 December 1996	Ampang	Selangor
AG18	Ampang		16 December 1996	Ampang	Selangor
4 - LRT Sri Petaling Line
SP1	Sentul Timur	3 Ampang Line	6 December 1998	Kuala Lumpur	Federal Territories
SP2	Sentul	3 Ampang Line	6 December 1998	Kuala Lumpur	Federal Territories
SP3	Titiwangsa	4 Sri Petaling Line; 8 KL Monorail; 12 Putrajaya Line; 13 Circle Line	6 December 1998	Kuala Lumpur	Federal Territories
SP4	PWTC	3 Ampang Line (Putra); 1 Batu Caves–Pulau Sebang Line; 2 Tanjung Malim–Port Klang Line	6 December 1998	Kuala Lumpur	Federal Territories
SP5	Sultan Ismail	3 Ampang Line 8 KL Monorail (Medan Tuanku)	6 December 1998	Kuala Lumpur	Federal Territories
SP6	Bandaraya–UOB	3 Ampang Line (Bank Negara); 1 Batu Caves–Pulau Sebang Line; 2 Tanjung Malim–Port Klang Line	16 December 1996	Kuala Lumpur	Federal Territories
SP7	Masjid Jamek	3 Ampang Line; 5 Kelana Jaya Line	16 December 1996	Kuala Lumpur	Federal Territories
SP8	Plaza Rakyat	3 Ampang Line; 9 Kajang Line (Merdeka)	16 December 1996	Kuala Lumpur	Federal Territories
SP9	BBCC–Hang Tuah	3 Ampang Line; 8 KL Monorail	16 December 1996	Kuala Lumpur	Federal Territories
SP10	Pudu	3 Ampang Line	16 December 1996	Kuala Lumpur	Federal Territories
SP11	Chan Sow Lin	3 Ampang Line; 12 Putrajaya Line	16 December 1996	Kuala Lumpur	Federal Territories
SP12	Cheras		11 July 1996	Kuala Lumpur	Federal Territories
SP13	Salak Selatan	13 Circle Line	11 July 1996	Kuala Lumpur	Federal Territories
SP14	Bandar Tun Razak		11 July 1996	Kuala Lumpur	Federal Territories
SP15	Bandar Tasik Selatan	1 Batu Caves–Pulau Sebang Line; 7 KLIA Transit; KTM ETS; Southern Integrated Terminal (TBS)	11 July 1996	Kuala Lumpur	Federal Territories
SP16	Sungai Besi	12 Putrajaya Line	11 July 1996	Kuala Lumpur	Federal Territories
SP17	Bukit Jalil		11 July 1996	Kuala Lumpur	Federal Territories
SP18	Sri Petaling		11 July 1996	Kuala Lumpur	Federal Territories
SP19	Awan Besar		31 October 2015	Kuala Lumpur	Federal Territories
SP20	Muhibbah		31 October 2015	Kuala Lumpur	Federal Territories
SP21	Alam Sutera		31 October 2015	Subang Jaya	Selangor
SP22	Kinrara BK 5		31 October 2015	Subang Jaya	Selangor
SP24	IOI Puchong Jaya		31 March 2016	Subang Jaya	Selangor
SP25	Pusat Bandar Puchong		31 March 2016	Subang Jaya	Selangor
SP26	Taman Perindustrian Puchong		31 March 2016	Subang Jaya	Selangor
SP27	Bandar Puteri		31 March 2016	Subang Jaya	Selangor
SP28	Puchong Perdana		30 June 2016	Subang Jaya	Selangor
SP29	Puchong Prima		30 June 2016	Subang Jaya	Selangor
SP31	Putra Heights	5 Kelana Jaya Line	30 June 2016	Subang Jaya	Selangor
5 - LRT Kelana Jaya Line
KJ1	Gombak	ECR East Coast Rail Link (ECR); Gombak Integrated Transit Terminal (TBG)	1 June 1999	Gombak	Selangor
KJ2	Taman Melati		1 June 1999	Kuala Lumpur	Federal Territories
KJ3	Wangsa Maju		1 June 1999	Kuala Lumpur	Federal Territories
KJ4	Sri Rampai		24 December 2010	Kuala Lumpur	Federal Territories
KJ5	Setiawangsa	13 Circle Line	1 June 1999	Ampang	Selangor
KJ6	Jelatek		1 June 1999	Ampang	Selangor
KJ7	Dato' Keramat		1 June 1999	Kuala Lumpur	Federal Territories
KJ8	Damai		1 June 1999	Kuala Lumpur	Federal Territories
KJ9	Ampang Park	12 Putrajaya Line	1 June 1999	Kuala Lumpur	Federal Territories
KJ10	KLCC		1 June 1999	Kuala Lumpur	Federal Territories
KJ11	Kampung Baru–Co-opbank Pertama		1 June 1999	Kuala Lumpur	Federal Territories
KJ12	Dang Wangi	8 KL Monorail (Bukit Nanas)	1 June 1999	Kuala Lumpur	Federal Territories
KJ13	Masjid Jamek	3 Ampang Line; 4 Sri Petaling Line	1 June 1999	Kuala Lumpur	Federal Territories
KJ14	Pasar Seni	9 Kajang Line (Kuala Lumpur); 1 Batu Caves–Pulau Sebang Line; 2 Tanjung Malim–Port Klang Line; KTM ETS	1 September 1998	Kuala Lumpur	Federal Territories
KJ15	KL Sentral–redONE	1 Batu Caves–Pulau Sebang Line; 2 Tanjung Malim–Port Klang Line; 6 KLIA Ekspres; 7 KLIA Transit; 8 KL Monorail; 9 Kajang Line (Muzium Negara); 10 KL Sentral–Terminal Skypark Line; KTM ETS	16 April 2001	Kuala Lumpur	Federal Territories
KJ16	Bangsar–Bank Rakyat		1 September 1998	Kuala Lumpur	Federal Territories
KJ17	Abdullah Hukum	2 Tanjung Malim–Port Klang Line; 1 Batu Caves–Pulau Sebang Line (Mid Valley)	1 September 1998	Kuala Lumpur	Federal Territories
KJ18	Kerinchi		1 September 1998	Kuala Lumpur	Federal Territories
KJ19	Universiti	13 Circle Line	1 September 1998	Kuala Lumpur	Federal Territories
KJ20	Taman Jaya		1 September 1998	Petaling Jaya	Selangor
KJ21	Asia Jaya		1 September 1998	Petaling Jaya	Selangor
KJ22	Taman Paramount		1 September 1998	Petaling Jaya	Selangor
KJ23	Taman Bahagia		1 September 1998	Petaling Jaya	Selangor
KJ24	Kelana Jaya		1 September 1998	Petaling Jaya	Selangor
KJ25	Lembah Subang		30 June 2015	Petaling Jaya	Selangor
KJ26	Ara Damansara		30 June 2015	Petaling Jaya	Selangor
KJ27	Glenmarie	11 Shah Alam Line	30 June 2015	Shah Alam	Selangor
KJ28	Subang Jaya	2 Tanjung Malim–Port Klang Line; 10 KL Sentral–Terminal Skypark Line	30 June 2015	Subang Jaya	Selangor
KJ29	SS15		30 June 2015	Subang Jaya	Selangor
KJ30	SS18		30 June 2015	Subang Jaya	Selangor
KJ31	USJ 7	B1 BRT Sunway Line	30 June 2015	Subang Jaya	Selangor
KJ32	Taipan		30 June 2015	Subang Jaya	Selangor
KJ33	Wawasan		30 June 2015	Subang Jaya	Selangor
KJ34	USJ 21		30 June 2015	Subang Jaya	Selangor
KJ35	Alam Megah		30 June 2015	Shah Alam	Selangor
KJ36	Subang Alam		30 June 2015	Shah Alam	Selangor
KJ37	Putra Heights	4 Sri Petaling Line	30 June 2015	Subang Jaya	Selangor
11 - LRT Shah Alam Line
SA01	Bandar Utama	9 Kajang Line	29 June 2026	Petaling Jaya	Selangor
SA02	Kayu Ara		29 June 2026	Petaling Jaya	Selangor
SA03	BU 11		29 June 2026	Petaling Jaya	Selangor
SA04	Tropicana		2031	Petaling Jaya	Selangor
SA05	Damansara Idaman		29 June 2026	Petaling Jaya	Selangor
SA06	Subang		29 June 2026	Petaling Jaya	Selangor
SA07	Glenmarie 2	5 Kelana Jaya Line	29 June 2026	Shah Alam	Selangor
SA08	Temasya		2031	Shah Alam	Selangor
SA09	Kerjaya		29 June 2026	Shah Alam	Selangor
SA10	Stadium Shah Alam		29 June 2026	Shah Alam	Selangor
SA12	Dato' Menteri		29 June 2026	Shah Alam	Selangor
SA13	Raja Muda		2031	Shah Alam	Selangor
SA14	UiTM Shah Alam		29 June 2026	Shah Alam	Selangor
SA15	Seksyen 7 Shah Alam		29 June 2026	Shah Alam	Selangor
SA16	Bukit Raja Selatan		2031	Klang	Selangor
SA17	Bandar Baru Klang		29 June 2026	Klang	Selangor
SA18	Pasar Besar Klang		29 June 2026	Klang	Selangor
SA19	Jalan Meru		29 June 2026	Klang	Selangor
SA20	Jambatan Kota		29 June 2026	Klang	Selangor
SA21	Taman Selatan		29 June 2026	Klang	Selangor
SA22	Seri Andalas		29 June 2026	Klang	Selangor
SA23	Klang Jaya		29 June 2026	Klang	Selangor
SA24	Bandar Bukit Tinggi		29 June 2026	Klang	Selangor
SA25	Bandar Botanik		2031	Klang	Selangor
SA26	Johan Setia		29 June 2026	Klang	Selangor

=== Bus rapid transit (BRT) Lines ===
The BRT Sunway Line is a bus rapid transit line in Bandar Sunway, Selangor. The BRT line is a public-private partnership project between Prasarana Malaysia and Sunway Group to provide an integrated transit service for the residents and commuters of Bandar Sunway and USJ.

A second BRT line known as the BRT Federal Line was proposed but has been scrapped indefinitely by the government.

Station Code	Station Name	Interchanges/Connections	Opening	District/City	State/Territory
B1 - BRT Sunway Line
SB1	Sunway-Setia Jaya	2 Tanjung Malim–Port Klang Line (Setia Jaya)	2 June 2015	Petaling Jaya	Selangor
SB2	Mentari		2 June 2015	Petaling Jaya	Selangor
SB3	Sunway Lagoon		2 June 2015	Subang Jaya	Selangor
SB4	SunMed		2 June 2015	Subang Jaya	Selangor
SB5	SunU-Monash		2 June 2015	Subang Jaya	Selangor
SB6	South Quay-USJ 1		2 June 2015	Subang Jaya	Selangor
SB7	USJ 7	5 Kelana Jaya Line	2 June 2015	Subang Jaya	Selangor

=== Airport rail link lines ===
There are two main airport rail link systems. One is operated by Express Rail Link (ERL) and another one by Keretapi Tanah Melayu (KTM).

The ERL system consists of two service, namely the KLIA Ekspres and the KLIA Transit that share a railway line that runs between KL Sentral and Kuala Lumpur International Airport's (KLIA) Terminal 2. The KLIA Ekspres is a non-stop service between KL Sentral and the KLIA's Terminal 1 and 2, and does not stop at any station in between (hence the name "express"). The KLIA Transit services all stations between KL Sentral and KLIA (hence the name "transit").

The KL Sentral–Terminal Skypark Line, operated by KTM as part of its KTM Komuter service, serves the Sultan Abdul Aziz Shah Airport (also known as Subang Airport), spanning 26 km from KL Sentral to Terminal Skypark station. The line shares a common route with the Tanjung Malim-Port Klang Line, but only stops at one station in between, Subang Jaya.

Station Code	Station Name	Interchanges/Connections	Opening	District/City	State/Territory
6 - ERL KLIA Ekspres
7 - ERL KLIA Transit
KE1 KT1	KL Sentral	1 Batu Caves–Pulau Sebang Line; 2 Tanjung Malim–Port Klang Line; 5 Kelana Jaya Line; 8 KL Monorail; 9 Kajang Line (Muzium Negara); 10 KL Sentral–Terminal Skypark Line; KTM ETS	14 April 2002 (KLIA Ekspres); 20 June 2002 (KLIA Transit)	Kuala Lumpur	Federal Territories
KT2	Bandar Tasik Selatan	1 Batu Caves–Pulau Sebang Line; 4 Sri Petaling Line; KTM ETS; Southern Integrated Terminal (TBS)	14 April 2002 (KLIA Ekspres); 20 June 2002 (KLIA Transit)	Kuala Lumpur	Federal Territories
KT3	Putrajaya & Cyberjaya	12 Putrajaya Line (Putrajaya Sentral)	14 April 2002 (KLIA Ekspres); 20 June 2002 (KLIA Transit)	Putrajaya	Federal Territories
KT4	Salak Tinggi		14 April 2002 (KLIA Ekspres); 20 June 2002 (KLIA Transit)	Sepang	Selangor
KE2 KT5	KLIA T1	Kuala Lumpur International Airport	14 April 2002 (KLIA Ekspres); 20 June 2002 (KLIA Transit)	Sepang	Selangor
KE3 KT6	KLIA T2	Kuala Lumpur International Airport	1 May 2014	Sepang	Selangor
10 - KTM KL Sentral-Terminal Skypark Line
KS01	KL Sentral	1 Batu Caves–Pulau Sebang Line; 2 Tanjung Malim–Port Klang Line; 5 Kelana Jaya Line; 6 KLIA Ekspres; 7 KLIA Transit; 8 KL Monorail; 9 Kajang Line (Muzium Negara); KTM ETS	1 May 2018	Kuala Lumpur	Federal Territories
KS02	Subang Jaya	2 Tanjung Malim–Port Klang Line; 5 Kelana Jaya Line	1 May 2018	Subang Jaya	Selangor
KS03	Terminal Skypark	Sultan Abdul Aziz Shah Airport	1 May 2018	Shah Alam	Selangor

=== Monorail lines ===
The KL Monorail is situated entirely within Kuala Lumpur city centre and serves the various shopping and entertainment centres throughout the city centre.

The Putrajaya Monorail was a proposed transit line that was meant to serve the administrative capital of Putrajaya. The line's construction began in 2004 but was halted due to the city's low population. As of 2024, the Government of Malaysia has no plans to revive the stalled monorail project.

Station Code	Station Name	Interchanges/Connections	Opening	District/City	State/Territory
8 - KL Monorail
MR1	KL Sentral	1 Batu Caves–Pulau Sebang Line; 2 Tanjung Malim–Port Klang Line; 5 Kelana Jaya Line; 6 KLIA Ekspres; 7 KLIA Transit; 9 Kajang Line (Muzium Negara); 10 KL Sentral–Terminal Skypark Line; KTM ETS	31 August 2003	Kuala Lumpur	Federal Territories
MR2	Tun Sambanthan		31 August 2003	Kuala Lumpur	Federal Territories
MR3	Maharajalela		31 August 2003	Kuala Lumpur	Federal Territories
MR4	BBCC–Hang Tuah	3 Ampang Line; 4 Sri Petaling Line	31 August 2003	Kuala Lumpur	Federal Territories
MR5	Imbi		31 August 2003	Kuala Lumpur	Federal Territories
MR6	Bukit Bintang	9 Kajang Line	31 August 2003	Kuala Lumpur	Federal Territories
MR7	Raja Chulan		31 August 2003	Kuala Lumpur	Federal Territories
MR8	Bukit Nanas	5 Kelana Jaya Line (Dang Wangi)	31 August 2003	Kuala Lumpur	Federal Territories
MR9	Medan Tuanku	(Sultan Ismail); 3 Ampang Line; 4 Sri Petaling Line	31 August 2003	Kuala Lumpur	Federal Territories
MR10	Chow Kit		31 August 2003	Kuala Lumpur	Federal Territories
MR11	Titiwangsa	3 Ampang Line; 4 Sri Petaling Line; 12 Putrajaya Line; 13 Circle Line	31 August 2003	Kuala Lumpur	Federal Territories

=== Mass rapid transit (MRT) lines ===
There are two MRT lines currently operating in the Klang Valley, namely the Kajang line and the Putrajaya line.

Both MRT lines begin at their shared northern terminus, Kwasa Damansara station, which provides a cross-platform interchange between the two lines. The Kajang Line proceeds southward, while the Putrajaya Line travels north-eastward and then south towards the city centre, where the two lines interchange again at Tun Razak Exchange station, before proceeding towards their respective termini.

A third MRT line, the proposed Circle line, is currently undergoing a pre-construction phase. The line will form a loop around the city centre.

Code	Station Name	Interchanges/Connections		District/City	State/Territory
9 - MRT Kajang Line
KG04	Kwasa Damansara	12 Putrajaya Line; Northern Integrated Terminal (TBU)	16 December 2016	Shah Alam	Selangor
KG05	Kwasa Sentral		16 December 2016	Shah Alam	Selangor
KG06	Kota Damansara–Thomson Hospital		16 December 2016	Petaling Jaya	Selangor
KG07	Surian–IOI Mall Damansara		16 December 2016	Petaling Jaya	Selangor
KG08	Mutiara Damansara		16 December 2016	Petaling Jaya	Selangor
KG09	Bandar Utama	11 Shah Alam Line	16 December 2016	Petaling Jaya	Selangor
KG10	Taman Tun Dr Ismail–Deloitte (TTDI)		16 December 2016	Kuala Lumpur	Federal Territories
KG12	Phileo Damansara		16 December 2016	Kuala Lumpur	Federal Territories
KG12A	Bukit Kiara Selatan	13 Circle Line	March 2027	Kuala Lumpur	Federal Territories
KG13	Pavilion Damansara Heights–Pusat Bandar Damansara		16 December 2016	Kuala Lumpur	Federal Territories
KG14	Semantan		16 December 2016	Kuala Lumpur	Federal Territories
KG15	Muzium Negara	(KL Sentral); 1 Batu Caves–Pulau Sebang Line; 2 Tanjung Malim–Port Klang Line; 5 Kelana Jaya Line; 6 KLIA Ekspres; 7 KLIA Transit; 8 KL Monorail; 10 KL Sentral–Terminal Skypark Line; KTM ETS	17 July 2017	Kuala Lumpur	Federal Territories
KG16	Pasar Seni	5 Kelana Jaya Line (Kuala Lumpur); 1 Batu Caves–Pulau Sebang Line; 2 Tanjung Malim–Port Klang Line; KTM ETS	17 July 2017	Kuala Lumpur	Federal Territories
KG17	Merdeka–Maybank	(Plaza Rakyat); 3 Ampang Line; 4 Sri Petaling Line	17 July 2017	Kuala Lumpur	Federal Territories
KG18A	Pavilion Kuala Lumpur–Bukit Bintang	8 KL Monorail	17 July 2017	Kuala Lumpur	Federal Territories
KG20	Tun Razak Exchange (TRX)	12 Putrajaya Line	17 July 2017	Kuala Lumpur	Federal Territories
KG21	Cochrane		17 July 2017	Kuala Lumpur	Federal Territories
KG22	Maluri–AEON	3 Ampang Line	17 July 2017	Kuala Lumpur	Federal Territories
KG23	Taman Pertama		17 July 2017	Kuala Lumpur	Federal Territories
KG24	Taman Midah	13 Circle Line	17 July 2017	Kuala Lumpur	Federal Territories
KG25	Taman Mutiara		17 July 2017	Kuala Lumpur	Federal Territories
KG26	Taman Connaught		17 July 2017	Kuala Lumpur	Federal Territories
KG27	Taman Suntex		17 July 2017	Hulu Langat	Selangor
KG28	Sri Raya		17 July 2017	Hulu Langat	Selangor
KG29	Bandar Tun Hussein Onn		17 July 2017	Hulu Langat	Selangor
KG30	Batu 11 Cheras		17 July 2017	Hulu Langat	Selangor
KG31	Bukit Dukung		17 July 2017	Hulu Langat	Selangor
KG33	Sungai Jernih		17 July 2017	Hulu Langat	Selangor
KG34	Stadium Kajang		17 July 2017	Hulu Langat	Selangor
KG35	Kajang	1 Batu Caves–Pulau Sebang Line; KTM ETS	17 July 2017	Hulu Langat	Selangor
12 - MRT Putrajaya Line
PY01	Kwasa Damansara	9 Kajang Line; Northern Integrated Terminal (TBU)	16 June 2022	Shah Alam	Selangor
PY03	Kampung Selamat		16 June 2022	Petaling Jaya	Selangor
PY04	Sungai Buloh	2 Tanjung Malim–Port Klang Line; KTM ETS	16 June 2022	Petaling Jaya	Selangor
PY05	Damansara Damai		16 June 2022	Petaling Jaya	Selangor
PY06	Sri Damansara Barat		16 June 2022	Petaling Jaya	Selangor
PY07	Sri Damansara Sentral		16 June 2022	Petaling Jaya	Selangor
PY08	Sri Damansara Timur	(Kepong Sentral); 2 Tanjung Malim–Port Klang Line; KTM ETS	16 June 2022	Petaling Jaya	Selangor
PY09	Metro Prima		16 June 2022	Kuala Lumpur	Federal Territories
PY10	Kepong Baru		16 June 2022	Kuala Lumpur	Federal Territories
PY11	Jinjang		16 June 2022	Kuala Lumpur	Federal Territories
PY12	Sri Delima		16 June 2022	Kuala Lumpur	Federal Territories
PY13	Kampung Batu	1 Batu Caves–Pulau Sebang Line	16 June 2022	Kuala Lumpur	Federal Territories
PY14	Kentonmen		16 March 2023	Kuala Lumpur	Federal Territories
PY15	Jalan Ipoh		16 March 2023	Kuala Lumpur	Federal Territories
PY16	Sentul Barat		16 March 2023	Kuala Lumpur	Federal Territories
PY17	Titiwangsa	3 Ampang Line; 4 Sri Petaling Line; 8 KL Monorail; 13 Circle Line	16 March 2023	Kuala Lumpur	Federal Territories
PY18	Hospital Kuala Lumpur		16 March 2023	Kuala Lumpur	Federal Territories
PY19	Raja Uda–Institut Jantung Negara		16 March 2023	Kuala Lumpur	Federal Territories
PY20	Ampang Park	5 Kelana Jaya Line	16 March 2023	Kuala Lumpur	Federal Territories
PY21	Persiaran KLCC		16 March 2023	Kuala Lumpur	Federal Territories
PY22	Conlay–Kompleks Kraf		16 March 2023	Kuala Lumpur	Federal Territories
PY23	Tun Razak Exchange (TRX)	9 Kajang Line	16 March 2023	Kuala Lumpur	Federal Territories
PY24	Chan Sow Lin	3 Ampang Line; 4 Sri Petaling Line	16 March 2023	Kuala Lumpur	Federal Territories
PY27	Kuchai	13 Circle Line	16 March 2023	Kuala Lumpur	Federal Territories
PY28	Taman Naga Emas		16 March 2023	Kuala Lumpur	Federal Territories
PY29	Sungai Besi	4 Sri Petaling Line	16 March 2023	Kuala Lumpur	Federal Territories
PY31	Serdang Raya Utara		16 March 2023	Subang Jaya	Selangor
PY32	Serdang Raya Selatan		16 March 2023	Subang Jaya	Selangor
PY33	Serdang Jaya		16 March 2023	Subang Jaya	Selangor
PY34	UPM		16 March 2023	Subang Jaya	Selangor
PY36	Taman Equine		16 March 2023	Subang Jaya	Selangor
PY37	Putra Permai		16 March 2023	Subang Jaya	Selangor
PY38	16 Sierra		16 March 2023	Sepang	Selangor
PY39	Cyberjaya Utara–Finexus		16 March 2023	Sepang	Selangor
PY40	Cyberjaya City Centre		16 March 2023	Sepang	Selangor
PY41	Putrajaya Sentral	7 KLIA Transit (Putrajaya & Cyberjaya)	16 March 2023	Putrajaya	Federal Territories
13 - MRT Circle Line (Opening 2032)
CC01	Bukit Kiara Selatan	9 Kajang Line	2028 - 2030	Kuala Lumpur	Federal Territories
CC02	Bukit Kiara		2028 - 2030	Kuala Lumpur	Federal Territories
CC03	Sri Hartamas		2028 - 2030	Kuala Lumpur	Federal Territories
CC04	Bukit Segambut		2028 - 2030	Kuala Lumpur	Federal Territories
CC05	Taman Sri Sinar		2028 - 2030	Kuala Lumpur	Federal Territories
CC06	Dutamas		2028 - 2030	Kuala Lumpur	Federal Territories
CC07	(Provisional)	2 Tanjung Malim–Port Klang Line	2028 - 2030	Kuala Lumpur	Federal Territories
CC08	(Provisional)		2028 - 2030	Kuala Lumpur	Federal Territories
CC09	Titiwangsa	3 Ampang Line; 4 Sri Petaling Line; 8 KL Monorail; 12 Putrajaya Line	2028 - 2030	Kuala Lumpur	Federal Territories
CC10	Kampung Puah		2028 - 2030	Kuala Lumpur	Federal Territories
CC11	Jalan Langkawi		2028 - 2030	Kuala Lumpur	Federal Territories
CC12	Danau Kota		2028 - 2030	Kuala Lumpur	Federal Territories
CC13	Setapak		2028 - 2030	Kuala Lumpur	Federal Territories
CC14	Rejang		2028 - 2030	Kuala Lumpur	Federal Territories
CC15	Setiawangsa	5 Kelana Jaya Line	2028 - 2030	Ampang	Selangor
CC16	AU2		2028 - 2030	Ampang	Selangor
CC17	Taman Hillview		2028 - 2030	Ampang	Selangor
CC18	Tasik Ampang		2028 - 2030	Ampang	Selangor
CC19	Kampung Pandan		2028 - 2030	Ampang	Selangor
CC20	Pandan Indah	3 Ampang Line	2028 - 2030	Ampang	Selangor
CC21	Taman Kencana		2028 - 2030	Ampang	Selangor
CC22	Taman Cheras		2028 - 2030	Kuala Lumpur	Federal Territories
CC23	Taman Midah	9 Kajang Line	2028 - 2030	Kuala Lumpur	Federal Territories
CC24	Jalan Yaacob Latif		2028 - 2030	Kuala Lumpur	Federal Territories
CC25	Sri Permaisuri		2028 - 2030	Kuala Lumpur	Federal Territories
CC26	Salak Selatan	4 Sri Petaling Line	2028 - 2030	Kuala Lumpur	Federal Territories
CC27	Salak Jaya		2028 - 2030	Kuala Lumpur	Federal Territories
CC28	Kuchai	12 Putrajaya Line	2028 - 2030	Kuala Lumpur	Federal Territories
CC29	Jalan Klang Lama		2028 - 2030	Kuala Lumpur	Federal Territories
CC30	Pantai Dalam	2 Tanjung Malim–Port Klang Line	2028 - 2030	Kuala Lumpur	Federal Territories
CC31	Pantai Permai		2028 - 2030	Kuala Lumpur	Federal Territories
CC32	Universiti	5 Kelana Jaya Line	2028 - 2030	Kuala Lumpur	Federal Territories
CC33	UM		2028 - 2030	Kuala Lumpur	Federal Territories

== Klang Valley Integrated Transit Map ==
The official Klang Valley Integrated Transit Map, released by Rapid KL, illustrates the connectivity between the different lines through interchanges and connecting stations. The map consists of all opened lines in the Klang Valley Integrated Transit system, but not necessarily operational (i.e. KL Sentral–Terminal Skypark Line). The map also features stations with parking facilities.

The transit map does not include the proposed MRT Circle Line.

- Latest version:
