= Klang Valley =

Urban conglomeration in Malaysia

Coordinates: 2°40′54″N 101°39′41″E

Klang Valley Lembah Klang
- Metropolitan area
Interactive map of Klang Valley
Kuala Lumpur & Putrajaya
Petaling District
Gombak District
Hulu Langat District
Sepang District
Klang District
- Country: Malaysia
- Region: (Federal Territories of Malaysia) Federal Territories; Selangor

Area
  - Total: 3,450 km^{2} (1,330 sq mi)

Population (2020)
  - Total: 8,146,111
  - Density: 2,360/km^{2} (6,120/sq mi)

GDP
  - Total: US$ 182 billion
  - Per capita: US$ 22,470
- Time zone: UTC+8 (MST)

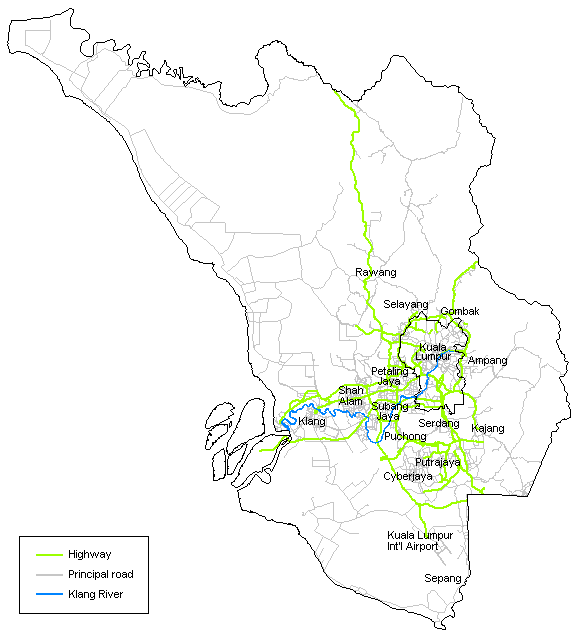
Principal cities within Klang Valley within the borders of the state of Selangor and the federal territories of Kuala Lumpur and Putrajaya.

Klang Valley (Malay: Lembah Klang) is an urban agglomeration in Malaysia centred on the federal territories of Kuala Lumpur and Putrajaya, along with their surrounding cities and towns in the state of Selangor. The Greater Kuala Lumpur metropolitan area is located within the Klang Valley.

The Klang Valley is geographically defined by the Titiwangsa Mountains to the east and the Strait of Malacca to the west. It stretches to Rawang in the northwest, Semenyih in the southeast and Klang and Port Klang in the southwest. The conurbation forms the core of Malaysia's industrial and commercial activity. As of 2022, the Klang Valley is home to around 9 million people, nearly one third of Malaysia's total population of 32 million.

== Origin ==
The valley is named after the Klang River, the principal river that flows through it that starts at Klang Gates Quartz Ridge in Gombak and flows into the Straits of Malacca in Port Klang, The river is closely linked to the early development of the area as a cluster of tin mining towns in the late 19th century. Development of the region took place largely in the East-West direction (between Gombak and Port Klang) but the urban areas surrounding Kuala Lumpur have since grown north and south towards the border with Perak and Negeri Sembilan respectively.

== Regions ==
There is no official designation of the boundaries that make up the Klang Valley but it is often assumed to comprise the following areas and their corresponding local authorities:

Definition of Klang Valley by parliamentary constituencies (2016 proposed boundaries) Core Constituencies in the Klang Valley (Greater Kuala Lumpur) Constituencies in the Greater Klang Valley (including the Rawang and Langat River Valley) Sometimes included (for TV and radio broadcasting) Course of the Klang River is shown in blue.

- Federal Territory of Putrajaya
  - Putrajaya Corporation
- Federal Territory of Kuala Lumpur
  - Kuala Lumpur City Hall
- Selangor district of Petaling
  - Shah Alam City Council
  - Petaling Jaya City Council
  - Subang Jaya City Council
- Selangor district of Klang
  - Klang Royal City Council
- Selangor district of Gombak
  - Selayang Municipal Council
- Selangor district of Hulu Langat
  - Ampang Jaya Municipal Council
  - Kajang Municipal Council
- Selangor district of Sepang
  - Sepang Municipal Council
- Selangor district of Kuala Langat
  - Kuala Langat Municipal Council

== Traffic and transport ==
Although the Klang Valley officially consists of separate cities and suburbs, integration between these areas is very high, supported by a developed road network and an expanding integrated rail transit system. Many expressways criss-cross the metropolis, making cars the most convenient way to travel. However, this has resulted in the Klang Valley's notorious traffic jams and extremely car-centric infrastructure, making peak hour driving exhausting and time consuming. Since the 1990s, several new rail systems such as Rapid KL's light rapid transit (LRT), mass rapid transit (MRT), KTM Komuter, ERL's airport rail links and the monorail have been developed, with most undergoing extensive expansions. The Klang Valley Integrated Transit System is currently being upgraded to include a new MRT line, the LRT line and a proposed monorail to serve Putrajaya.

Despite these developments, public transport and traffic in the Klang Valley still suffers from serious shortcomings. Although bus networks across the region are extensive, last mile connectivity remains poor and many rail stations are located in isolated areas. As a result, ridership on these systems remains low, with many residents still preferring to drive. In 2024, National Defence University of Malaysia associate professor Wu Chai Bin stated that traffic congestion in the Klang Valley might persist for more than a decade unless the public transport network is fundamentally reimagined.

== See also ==
- 1998 Klang Valley water crisis
- Greater Kuala Lumpur
- Kuala Lumpur
- List of metropolitan areas in Asia
- Public Transport in Klang Valley
