= Taman Paramount LRT station =

Metro station in Selangor, Malaysia

Coordinates: 3°06′16″N 101°37′23″E

KJ22 Taman Paramount
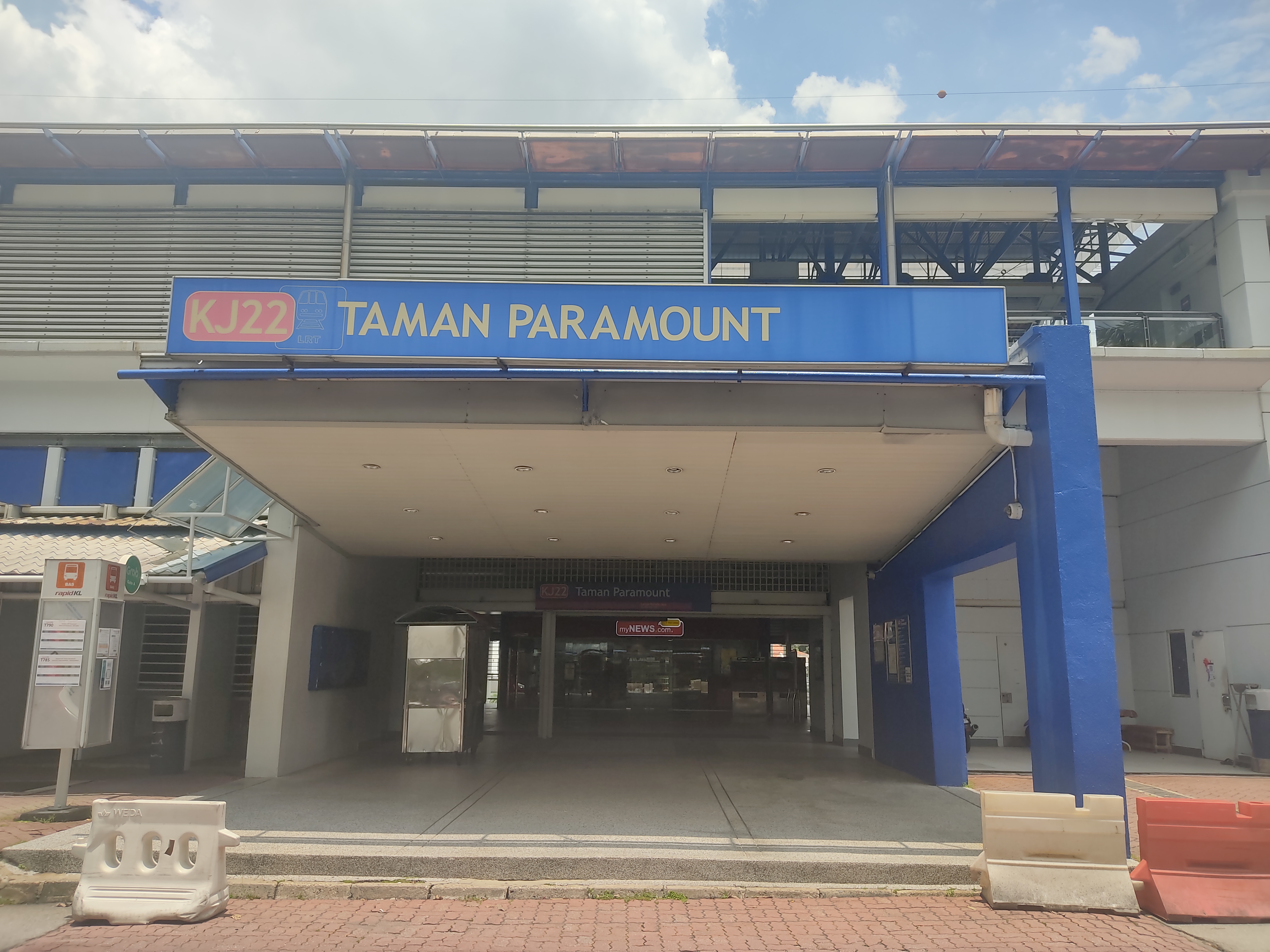

General information
- Other names: Malay: تامن ڤاراماونت (Jawi); Chinese: 百乐花园; Tamil: தாமான் பாராமவுண்ட்
- Location: Jalan 21/1, Taman Paramount; Seksyen 21, 46300 Petaling Jaya; Selangor; Malaysia
- System: Rapid KL
- Owner: Prasarana Malaysia
- Operator: Rapid Rail
- Line: 5 Kelana Jaya Line
- Platforms: 2 side platforms
- Tracks: 2

Construction
- Structure type: Elevated
- Parking: Not Available
- Accessible: Available

Other information
- Station code: KJ22

History
- Opened: 1 September 1998; 27 years ago

Services
Preceding station		Following station
Asia Jaya towards Gombak	Kelana Jaya Line	Taman Bahagia towards Putra Heights
Location

Taman Paramount LRT station is a light rapid transit (LRT) station in Petaling Jaya that is served by Rapid KL's LRT Kelana Jaya Line. This station is located in Taman Paramount, Petaling Jaya, Selangor, Malaysia.

Neighbourhoods surrounding the station include Sections 14, 20, 21 and 22 as well as Kampung Tunku in Section SS1 of Petaling Jaya.

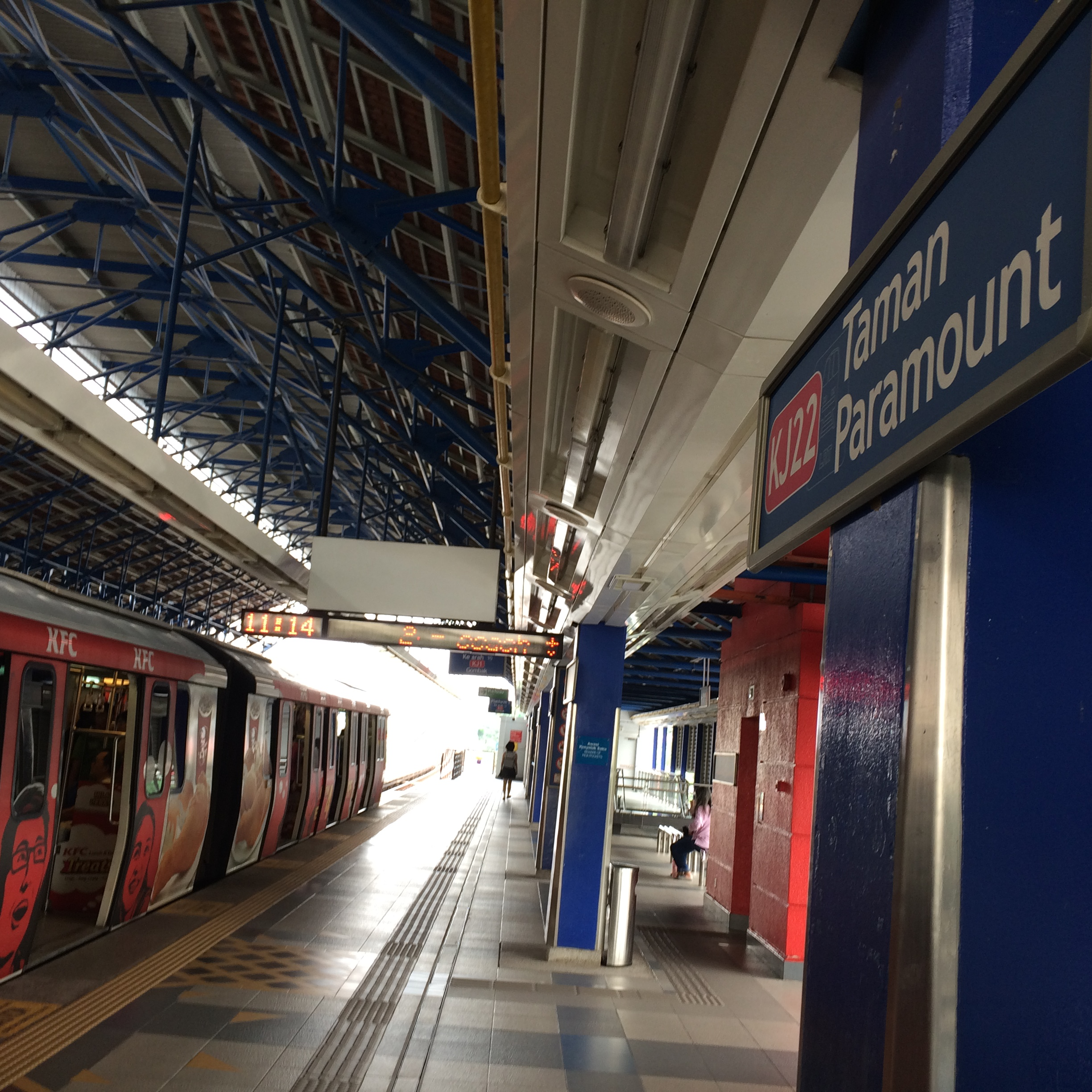
Train at Taman Paramount LRT

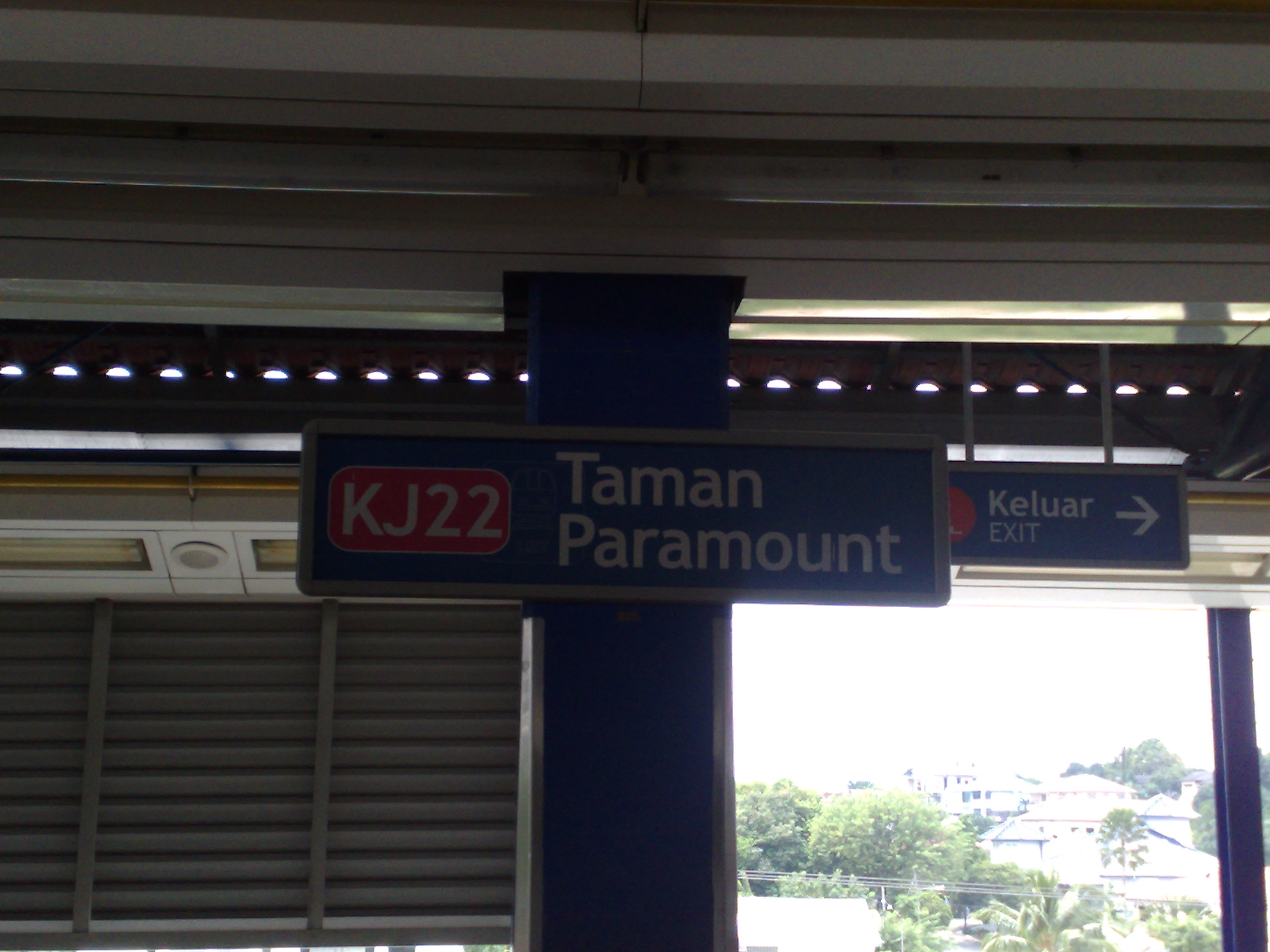
Taman Paramount station

The Taman Paramount LRT station (Kelana Jaya Line)

Rapid DRT services in the station

== See also ==
- List of rail transit stations in Klang Valley
