= Conlay MRT station =

Railway station in Bukit Bintang, Malaysia

Coordinates: 3°09′05.2″N 101°43′03.7″E

PY22 Conlay – Kompleks Kraf
- Exterior view from Entrance B of the station.

General information
- Other names: Malay: كونلاي (Jawi); Chinese: 康莱; Tamil: கோன்லே
- Location: Jalan Stonor, Bukit Bintang; 50450 Kuala Lumpur; Malaysia
- System: Rapid KL
- Owner: MRT Corp
- Operator: Rapid Rail
- Line: 12 Putrajaya Line
- Platforms: 1 island platform
- Tracks: 2

Construction
- Structure type: Underground
- Depth: 30.5 metres (100 ft)
- Parking: Not available
- Accessible: Yes

Other information
- Status: Operational
- Station code: PY22

History
- Opened: 16 March 2023; 3 years ago

Services
Preceding station		Following station
Persiaran KLCC towards Kwasa Damansara	Putrajaya Line	Tun Razak Exchange towards Putrajaya Sentral
Location

The Conlay MRT station, or Conlay–Kompleks Kraf MRT station under the station naming rights programme, is a mass rapid transit (MRT) station in the Bukit Bintang subdistrict of central Kuala Lumpur, Malaysia. It is one of the stations on the MRT Putrajaya Line.

The station commenced operations on 16 March 2023.

== Station features ==
=== Station location ===
The station is located on Jalan Stonor and is near its namesake, Jalan Conlay.

Nearby landmarks include the Royale Chulan Hotel, Kuala Lumpur Crafts' Complex and Rumah Penghulu Abu Seman.

Pavilion Kuala Lumpur is a 750-metre walk away, allowing access to the Bukit Bintang MRT station and Bukit Bintang Monorail station.

=== Exits and entrances ===
There are two entrances for this station. Both of the entrances are located on opposite sides of each other, Entrance A to the north and Entrance B to the south.

Putrajaya Line station
Entrance	Location	Destination	Picture
A	Jalan Kia Peng	Taxi and E-hailing Layby, Malaysia Design Development Centre, Ampersand, Eaton Residences, The Pearl KLCC, Prince Court Medical Centre	
B	Jalan Conlay	Taxi and E-hailing Layby, Kuala Lumpur Craft Complex, Royale Chulan Hotel, 1A Stonor, Malaysian Heritage Trust, Chulan Tower, 8 Conlay, Plaza Conlay, The Conlay	
