= Kayu Ara LRT station =

Metro station in Malaysia

SA02 Kayu Ara
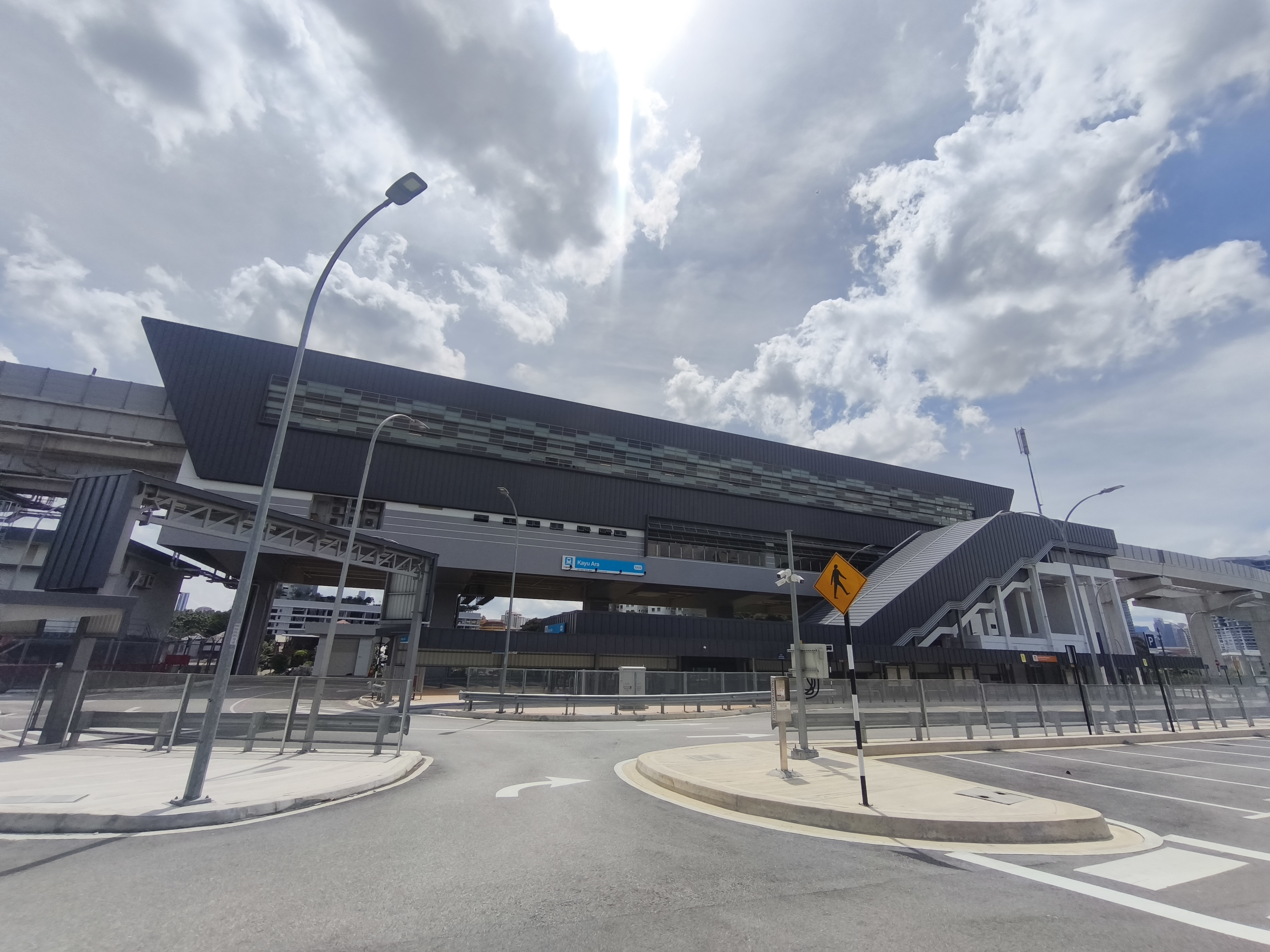
- Kayu Ara LRT Station in 2026

General information
- Other names: Malay: کايو ارا (Jawi); Chinese: 卡尤阿拉; Tamil: காயு ஆரா
- Location: Kampung Sungai Kayu Ara; Selangor; Malaysia
- Coordinates: 3°08′06″N 101°37′00″E
- System: Rapid KL
- Owner: Prasarana Malaysia
- Operator: Rapid Rail
- Line: 11 Shah Alam Line
- Platforms: 1 island platform
- Tracks: 2

Construction
- Structure type: Elevated
- Parking: Available, 350 parking bays.
- Accessible: Yes

Other information
- Station code: SA02

History
- Opened: 29 June 2026; 2 months ago

Services
Preceding station		Following station
Bandar Utama Terminus	Shah Alam Line	BU 11 towards Johan Setia
Location

The Kayu Ara LRT station is a light rapid transit (LRT) station that serves the suburb of Damansara Utama and Kampung Sungai Kayu Ara in Petaling Jaya, Selangor, Malaysia. It is one of the stations on the Shah Alam Line. The station is located right next to the Kayu Ara River. The station is an elevated rapid transit station and forms part of the Klang Valley Integrated Transit System.

== History ==
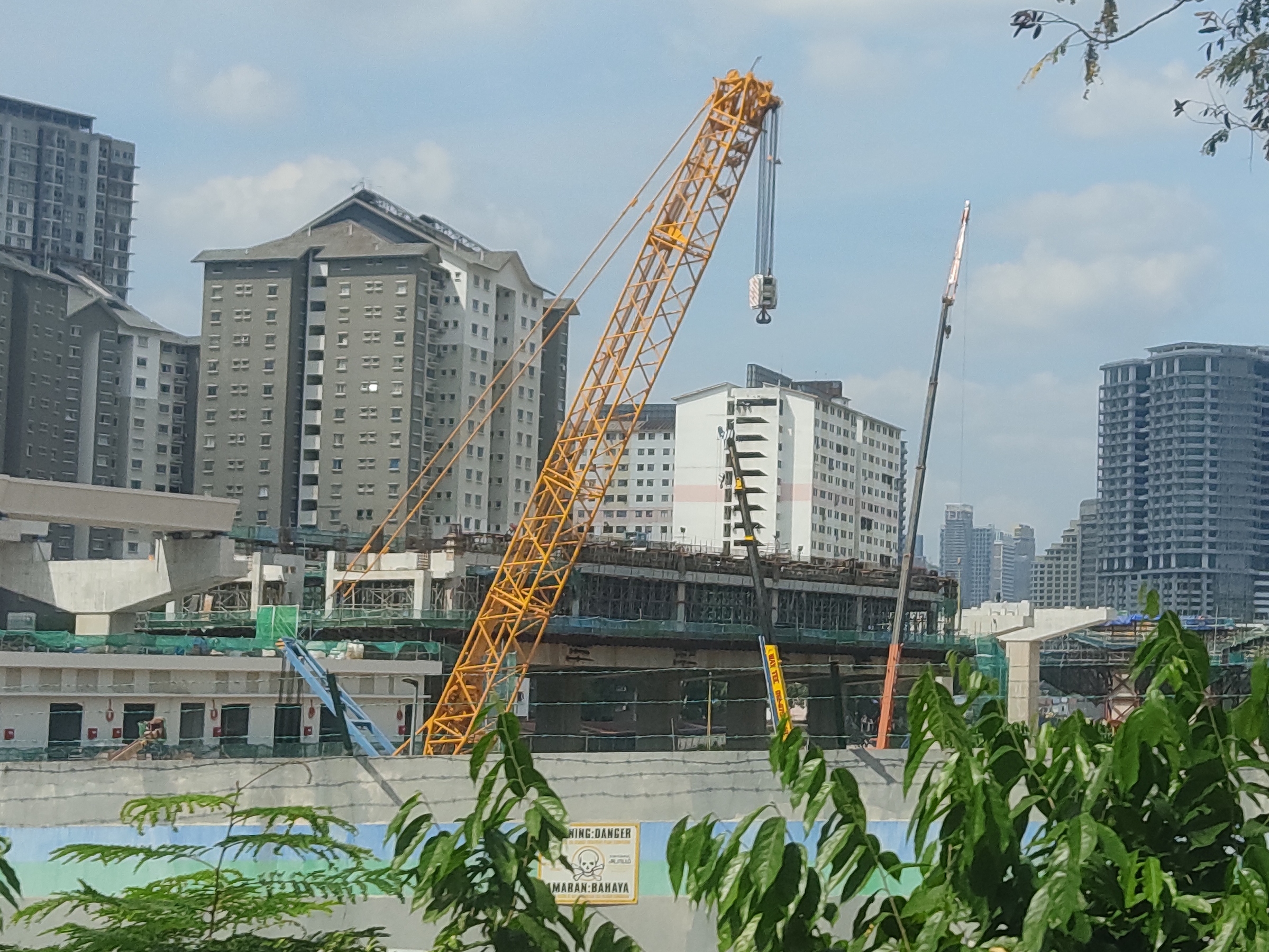
Kayu Ara LRT Station

This is the second station along the RM9 billion line project, with the line's maintenance depot located in Johan Setia, Klang. It has facilities such as kiosks, restrooms, elevators, and taxi stands.

== Exits and entrances ==
Kayu Ara station has a total of 1 entrance.

Shah Alam Line station
Entrance	Location	Destination	Picture
A	Kayu Ara	Kampung Sungai Kayu Ara	
