= Selayang Municipal Council =

Local authority in Selangor, Malaysia

Selayang Municipal Council Majlis Perbandaran Selayang
- Local Government Act 1976

Type
- Type: Municipal Council of Selayang

History
- Founded: 1 January 1997

Leadership
- President: Mohd Yazid Sairi

Structure
- Political groups: Councillors: PKR (13); DAP (6); Amanah (4); Orang Besar Daerah Gombak (1)

Motto
- Selayangku Sayang

Meeting place
- MPS Headquarters, Bandar Baru Selayang

Website
- www.mps.gov.my

Footnotes
- Previously known as Gombak District Council (Majlis Daerah Gombak) from 1977 until 1997

Selayang Municipal Council (Malay: Majlis Perbandaran Selayang, MPS) is a local authority which administrates Gombak district and surrounding areas. An agency is under the Selangor state government, MPS is responsible for public health and sanitation, waste removal and management, town planning, environmental protection and building control, social and economic development and general maintenance functions of urban infrastructure. Its main headquarters is located at Bandar Baru Selayang.

== History ==
Formerly known as Gombak District Council (Majlis Daerah Gombak) from 1 January 1977, this agency was granted municipal status on 1 January 1997.

=== Presidents ===
No.	Name	Term
1	Kasjoo Kadis	1 Jan 1997-31 Jul 1999
2	Bakaruddin Othman	1 Aug 1999-31 May 2005
3	Zainal Abidin Azim	1 Jun 2005-8 Nov 2010
4	Zainal Abidin Aala	1 Mac 2011-30 Nov 2012
5	Mohd Azizi Mohd Zain	2 Jan 2013-31 Mac 2015
6	Sulaiman Abd Rahman	1 Apr 2015-22 Mac 2019
7	Shamsul Shahril Badliza Mohd Noor	1 Oct 2019-19 May 2021
8	Mohd Yazid Sairi S.I.S.	19 Jul 2021-Incumbent

== Organisation chart ==
=== President (Yang di-Pertua) of Selayang ===
Mohd Yazid Sairi

=== Chief Information Officer ===
Zulaina Abu Talib

== Councilors ==
2023 Session

Zone No.	Member	Party
PKR 13 | DAP 6 | AMANAH 4 | Orang Besar Gombak 1
1	Wan Mahmood Pa'wan Teh	Orang Besar Gombak
2	Mazlan Musa	PKR
3	Ahmad Usamah Zulkifli	AMANAH
4	Anuar Jasmin	PKR
5	Ruhanah Masruki	PKR
6	Muhammad Husaini Mohd Yunos	PKR
7	Deveandran Selvaraju	PKR
8	Mohammad Faizal Ismail	PKR
9	Muhammad Najmi Samsudin	DAP
10	Ahmad Zahiri Zahid Sofian	AMANAH
11	Wan Anwar Wan Ibrahim	AMANAH
12	U Chin Ong	DAP
13	Tam Kar Lye	DAP
14	Sulaiman Abu Samah	PKR
15	Alice Choo Foong Thye	DAP
16	Anmuniandy Vellymalai	PKR
17	P.Mariammal S.Ponnusamy	DAP
18	Loo Voon May	PKR
19	Saharudin Abu Bakar	PKR
20	Mohamad Faridul Amini Suhaimi	AMANAH
21	Zuraidah Abdul Majid	PKR
22	Ng Kok Chuan	PKR
23	Cheong Heng Wai	DAP
24	Fok Wai Mun	PKR

== Departments ==
1. Jabatan Khidmat Pengurusan (Management Services Department)
2. Jabatan Perbendaharaan (Treasury Department)
3. Jabatan Penilaian dan Pengurusan Harta
4. Jabatan Perhubungan Awam dan Perancangan Korporat (Corporate Planning and Public Communications Department)
5. Jabatan Perancang Bandar dan Pembangunan (Town Planning and Development Department)
6. Jabatan Perkhidmatan Perbandaran dan Kesihatan (Municipal and Health Services Department)
7. Jabatan Penguatkuasaan dan Keselamatan (Enforcement and Safety Department)
8. Jabatan Kejuruteraan (Engineering Department)
9. Bahagian Perundangan
10. Bahagian Audit Dalam
11. Bahagian Perolehan
12. Bahagian Hasil
13. Unit Pusat Setempat

== Branch office ==
- Rawang
- Batu Arang

== Sports ==
=== Sport Avenue ===
- Majlis Perbandaran Selayang Stadium

== Floral emblem ==
Siantan (Ixora Sunkist)

== Administration area ==
Below are the administration area for MPS which further breakdown into 24 zones.

Zone 1

- Kampung Simpang Tiga
- Desa Gemilang
- Kampung Sungai Chinchin
- Taman Bukit Lela
- Kampung Gombak Utara
- Taman Mutiara Gombak
- Kampung Orang Asli
- Taman Permai Jaya
- Gombak Utara
- Kampung Batu 11, 12, 13 Gombak
- Kampung Sungai Salak
- Universiti Islam Antarabangsa Malaysia (UIAM)
- Kampung Sungai Pusu
- Villa Bestari

Zone 2

- Taman Gombak Jaya
- Taman Cemerlang
- Taman Kamariah
- Kampung Tengah Gombak
- Kampung Kerdas
- Taman Setia Gombak
- Kampung Kenangan
- Gombak Setia
- Taman Perwira
- Taman Harmonis
- Kampung Sentosa Tambahan

Zone 3

- Taman Greenwood
- Taman Berlian
- Taman Melewar Indah
- Desa Minang
- Taman Selaseh Fasa 1
- Kampung Changkat
- Taman Gombak
- Taman Sahabat
- Taman Berjaya
- Taman Gombak Ria

Zone 4

- Taman Sri Gombak
- Prima Sri Gombak
- Taman Pinggiran Batu Caves
- Indah Gemilang
- Vistana Gemilang
- Taman Gemilang
- Kampung Melayu Sri Gombak
- Taman Pinggiran Indah
- Taman Bukit Permata
- Taman Pinggiran
- Astana Gemilang
- Taman Pinggiran Permata

Zone 5

- Taman Selaseh Fasa 2
- Taman Samudera
- Apartment Cassmaria Gombak
- Apartment Fiona Gombak
- Taman Samudera Teres
- Taman Desa Batu Caves
- Kondominium Banjaria
- Taman Industri Dolomite

Zone 6

- Taman Jasa Utama
- Taman Jasa
- Kampung Sungai Tua Baharu dan Tanah Gantian
- Kampung Sungai Kertas
- Kampung Bahtera
- Apartment & Flat J A Manan
- Taman Gombak Permai
- Perkampungan Orang Asli Ulu Yam
- Taman Jasa Pewira
- Wira Damai
- Kampung Jalan Bacang
- Taman Desa Indah

Zone 7

- Kampung Nakhoda
- Taman Laksamana
- Taman Selayang
- Taman Sri Astana
- Putra Laksamana
- Selayang Makmur
- Kampung Laksamana
- Villa Laksamana
- Kampung Selayang Baru (Jalan 2-18)

Zone 8

- Taman Sri Selayang
- Kampung Baru Batu Caves
- Taman Desa Putra
- Medan Batu Caves
- Taman Amaniah
- Taman Batu Caves
- Indian Settlement
- Dataran Selayang
- Suria Selayang
- Sri Gotong Apartment
- Kampung Melayu Batu Caves
- Taman Raintree
- Simfoni Heights Kondominium
- Wisma Keringat

Zone 9

- Sunway Batu Caves
- Dolomite
- Taman Sri Batu Caves
- Kawasan Industri Batu Caves
- Medan Selayang
- Centrepoint Batu Caves
- Kampung Gombak Indah
- Taman Industri Bolton

Zone 10

- Kampung Selayang Baru
- Kampung Selayang Permai
- Kampung Mahkota
- Kampung Bendahara
- Kampung Selayang Indah
- Lembah Indah
- Bandar Baru Selayang 2A
- Bandar Baru Selayang 2B
- Apartment Julia
- Selayang Mulia
- Selayang Pandang
- Apartment Kota Warisan
- Taman Selayang Mutiara

Zone 11

- Taman Selayang Segar
- Pinggiran Templer
- Kawasan Industri Selayang Baru
- Sierra Selayang
- Taman Selayang Baru
- Taman Bukit Idaman
- UiTM Selayang
- Puncak Templer
- Selayang Heights
- Taman Prima Selayang
- Taman-Taman Templer Park
- Kawasan Industri Prima Selayang
- Prima Selayang
- Taman Perumahan (Mah Sing)
- One Selayang
- Bandar Baru Selayang
- Hospital Selayang
- Emerald Evanue
- One Sierra
- IPD Gombak

Zone 12

- Taman Bidara
- Taman Sri Melati
- Taman Selayang Jaya
- Taman Selayang Bahagia
- Taman Selayang Utama
- Taman Selayang Indah
- Selayang Capital
- Taman Selayang Permai
- 280 Residency Kondominium
- Selayang Point Kondominium

Zone 13

- Taman Daya
- Kepong Hulu
- Taman Indah Perdana
- Forest Research Institute Malaysia(FRIM)
- Paragon Utama
- Ivory Apartment
- Taman Perusahaan Selayang Utama

Zone 14

- Taman Setia
- Kampung Kenanga
- Taman Kanching Jaya
- Rawang Putra
- Taman Setia Jaya
- Taman Bersatu
- Kampung Melayu Batu 16
- Taman Muhibbah
- Flat Taman Setia
- Taman Tun Perak
- Kampung Sungai Samak
- Kampung Setia Rawang
- Desa Sri Bayu
- Taman Mawar
- Taman Jati
- Kampung Sungai Terentang
- Taman PKNS Bt 17
- Taman Rawang Perdana
- Kampung Dato' Lee Kim Sai
- Industri Rawang Perdana 4,5,8
- Taman Tun Teja
- Taman PKNS Batu 16
- Kampung Sepakat

Zone 15

- Rawang Perdana RP 1- RP 9,
- Bukit Rawang Jaya
- Kampung Tanjung
- Kawasan Industri Batu 20
- Green Park
- Kampung Rajah
- Kampung Pekan Rawang
- Bandar Rawang Baru & Lama
- Taman Rawang Perdana 2
- Taman Rawang Mutiara
- Kampung Lim Tan
- Taman Sri Hijau

Zone 16

- Sri Rawang
- Kuala Garing
- Taman Sri Garing
- Taman Garing Permai
- Taman Garing Utama & Taman Sekitarnya
- Emerald East
- Emerald West
- AEON Rawang / Taman Anggun
- Kampung Sungai Bakau / Kampung Sungai Bakau Tambahan
- Sungai Dua
- Taman Bayu Permai
- Kawasan Industri Belmas Johan & sekitarnya
- Industrial Park Management Committee (IPMC)

Zone 17

- Jalan Batu Arang sehingga Perkuburan Islam Bandar Country Homes
- Bandar Country Homes & Taman-Taman sekitarnya
- Taman Desa Mas
- Puteri Heights & Taman-Taman sekitarnya
- Taman Velox
- Kota Bidari
- Saujana Rawang

Zone 18

- Batu Arang
- Kampung Melayu Tambahan
- Rumah Murah PKNS Batu Arang
- Taman Muhibbah
- Bukit Nenas, Batu Arang
- Kawasan Industri Kota Puteri
- Bandar Tasik Puteri
- Taman Kota Puteri
- Taman M-Residensi
- Pangsapuri Desa Puteri & Sekitarnya

Zone 19

- Rumah Awam Ladang Baru
- Taman Rahmat Jaya
- Kampung Cempedak
- Kampung Setia Kuang
- Kampung Melayu Sri Kundang
- Kampung Batu 20 Kuang
- Kampung Permata Kundang
- Kampung Baru Cina Kundang
- Bandar Baru Kundang
- Taman Kundang Jaya
- Taman Desa Kundang
- Kawasan Industri Kundang Jaya
- Tasik Biru
- Kampung Damai
- Kampung Gombak
- Pekan Kuang
- Rumah Murah Kuang
- Kundang Mardi
- Kuang Raya
- Kampung Sungai Serai

Zone 20

- Taman Matang Jaya
- Taman Impian Indah
- Taman Sri Putra Mas
- Saujana Akasia
- Kampung Matang Pagar
- Kampung Bunga Raya
- Kampung Orang Asli Kuang
- Taman Sri Putra 1-3

Zone 21

- UiTM Sg Buloh
- Kampung Bukit Lagong
- Kampung Org Asli Sg Buloh
- Hospital Kusta
- Hospital Sg Buloh
- Kampung Melayu Sg Buloh
- Magilds Industri Park
- Taman Desa Bkt Indah
- Kampung Sri Indah A Dan B

Zone 22

- Taman Amansari
- Taman Tiara Putra
- Taman Tiara Putri
- Bukit Rahman Putra 7-9
- Taman Villa Putra
- Kawasan Industri Sungai Buloh Jaya
- Kawasan Industri Kampung Jaya
- Kawasan Industri Putra
- Pinggiran Rahman Putra

Zone 23

- Taman Sri Aman Height Sierramas
- Valencia
- Taman Suria
- Kampung Desa Aman
- Damansara Suria
- Taman Desa Aman
- Taman Wangsa Aman
- Taman Perindustrian Tago
- Kawasan Perindustrian KIP
- Kawasan Industri Desa Aman
- Villa Mas
- Kampung Masjid
- Kampung Sri Bunga
- Wangsa Permai
- Sierramas West
- Desa Aman Puri

Zone 24

- Puncak Desa
- Taman Bukit Desa
- Desa Jaya Kepong
- Taman Sri Ehsan
- Taman Usaha Jaya
- Taman Industri Ehsan Jaya
- Kawasan Industri Bukit Desa
- Taman Desa Jaya
- Taman Ehsan
- Taman Ehsan Timur
- Kawasan Industri Taman Ehsan
