= Klang Royal City Council =

Local authority in Klang City, Selangor, Malaysia

Klang Royal City Council Majlis Bandaraya Diraja Klang
- Local Government Act 1976

Type
- Type: Local authority of the Klang, Selangor

History
- Founded: 23 November 2023 (Proclamation: 5 February 2024)

Leadership
- Mayor: Abdul Hamid Hussain
- Vice Mayor: Mohd Zary Affendi bin Mohd Arif

Structure
- Political groups: Councillors: DAP (11); PKR (10); AMANAH (3); Orang Besar Klang (1)

Motto
- Perpaduan Asas Kemakmuran (Unity is the Basis of Prosperity)

Meeting place
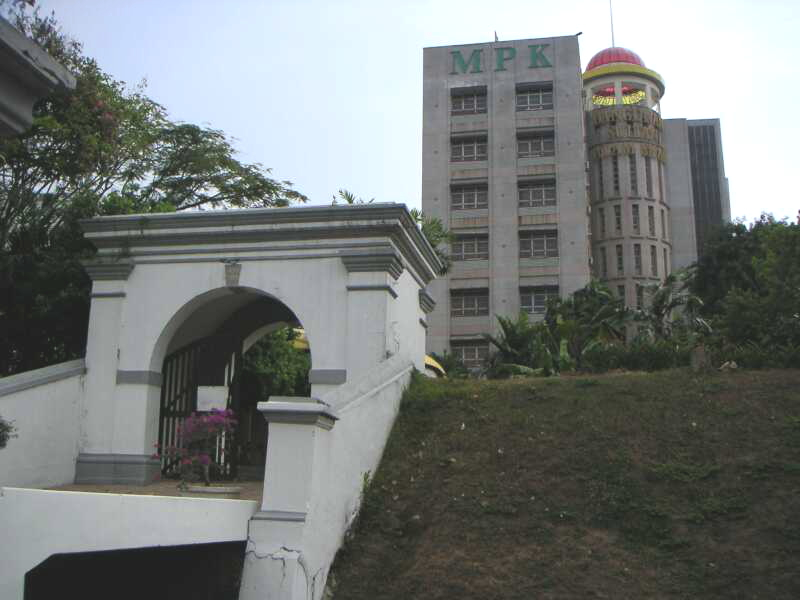
- Sultan Alam Shah Building, Jalan Perbandaran, 41675 Klang, Selangor Darul Ehsan.

Website
- www.mbdk.gov.my

Klang City Council, officially known as the Klang Royal City Council (Majlis Bandaraya Diraja Klang, MBDK) is a local authority which administers Klang in Malaysia. This agency is under the purview of Selangor state government.

== History ==
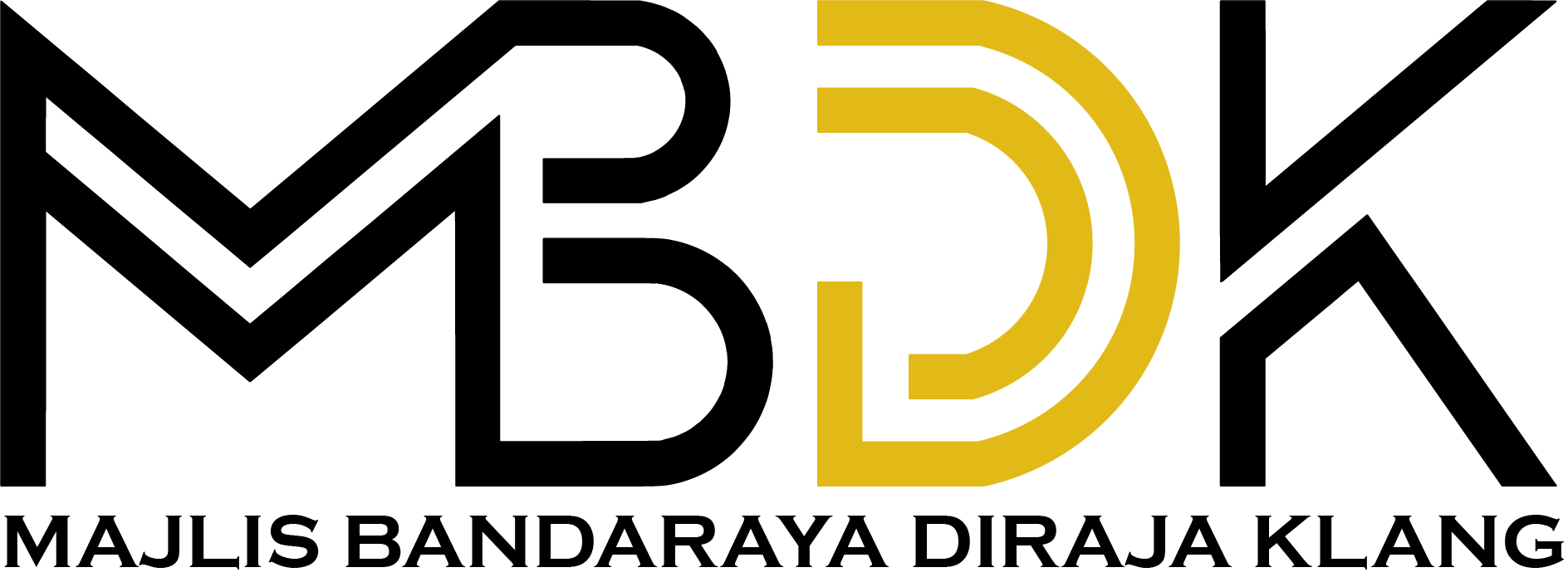
Text logo of MBDK

Prior to its establishment in May 1890 to administer Klang town, Klang Local Authority was known as Klang Health Board. Its official boundary was set in 1895, which was later combined with Port Swettenham in December 1945 to form Klang Municipal Board.

Further change in the administration came when Klang Town Council was established in 1954. With this new administrative system Klang developed rapidly until 1971 when Port Klang, Kapar and Meru were incorporated to form Klang District Council.

With the enforcement of the Local Government Act 1976 (Act 171) and the reorganisation of all local authorities, Klang District Council was upgraded to Klang Municipal Council (KMC) on 1 January 1977.

Year	Known As
1890	Klang Health Board
1945	Klang Town Board
1954	Klang Town Council
1975	Klang District Council
1977	Klang Municipal Council
2024	Klang Royal City Council

=== Klang Municipal Council ===
The Seal of Klang Municipal Council (1977-2024)

== Councilors ==
2023-2024 Session

Zone No.	Member	Party
DAP 11 | PKR 9 | AMANAH 3 | Orang Besar 1
	Mohammed Khusrin Munawi	Orang Besar Klang
N40	Quah Perng Fei	DAP
N41	Lee Sek Wun	DAP
N42A	Chow Pung Meng	AMANAH
N42B	Abdul Razak Abdul Rashid	AMANAH
N43A	Ti Thong Siew	PKR
N43B	Azizi Ayob	PKR
N43C	Muthumariammah N.Suppaeya	PKR
N44A	Lee Fu Haw	DAP
N44B	Abd Halid Ka'ab	DAP
N45A	Low Kwee Sia	DAP
N45B	Gan Eu Eng	DAP
N45C	Lee Sek Wun	DAP
N45D	Quah Perng Fei	DAP
N46A	Chua Alan	PKR
N46B	Pannir Selvam Gopal	PKR
N46C	Mohd Fauzi Othman	PKR
N46D	Kanmani Letchumanan	DAP
N47A	Yugarajah Palanisamy	DAP
N47B	Kumanan Perumal	DAP
N47C	Ang Kian Wah	DAP
N47D	Chia Siu	DAP
N48A	Prabu Munusamy	PKR
N48B	Mahendran Marimuthu	PKR
N49A	Abdul Mutalib Adam	AMANAH
N49B	Zaleha Jalal	PKR

== Legislation ==
Acts

1. Local Government Act 1976 (Act 171)
2. Street, Drainage and Building Act 1974 (Act 133)
3. Town and Country Planning Act 1976 (Act 172)
4. Building and Common Property ( Maintenance and Management) Act 2007 (Act 663)
5. Food Act 1983 (Act 281)
6. Road Transport Act 1987 (Act 333)
7. Destruction of Disease-Bearing Insects Act 1975 (Act 154)
8. Strata Titles Act 1985 (Act 318)
9. Strata Management Act 2013 (Act 757)

Enactments

1. Cattle & Buffalo Control Enactment 1971
2. Entertainment and Places of Entertainment (Selangor) Enactment 1995
3. Freedom of Information Enactment (Selangor) 2011
4. Natural Disaster Relief Fund Enactment 2011

By-laws

1. Uniformed Building Bylaw (Selangor) 1986
2. Undang-Undang Kecil Bangunan Seragam 1984 (UKBS 19484) :-
3. Undang-Undang Kecil Bangunan Seragam Selangor 1986 - Sel (1)
4. Undang-Undang Kecil Bangunan Seragam Selangor 1986 - Sel. P.
5. Undang-Undang Kecil Bangunan Seragam Selangor 1993 - Sel. P.
6. Undang-Undang Kecil Bangunan Seragam Selangor 2000 - Sel (1)
7. Undang-Undang Kecil Bangunan Seragam Selangor 2000 - Sel. P.
8. Undang-Undang Kecil Bangunan Seragam Selangor 2007 - Sel. P.
9. Undang-Undang Kecil Bangunan Seragam Selangor 2012 - Sel (1)
10. Undang-Undang Kecil Bangunan Seragam Selangor 2012 - Sel. P.
11. Undang-Undang Besar Makan percuma Selangor 2000 - Sel.P.
12. Joint License Allocation Bylaw (MPK) 1992
13. Road Works Bylaw 1996
14. Bylaw(Compounding Offences) (MPK) Local Government 2005
15. Bylaw (Compounding Offences) (MPK) Road, Drain and Building 2005
16. Bylaw for Private Carpark License (MPK) 2005
17. Park Bylaw (MPK) 2005
18. Public Toilet Bylaw (MPK) 2005
19. Collecting, Expulsion and Disposal Bylaw (MPK) 2007
20. Hotel Bylaw (MPK) 2007
21. Hawker Bylaw (MPK) 2007
22. Trade, Business and Industrial Licensing Bylaw (MPK) 2007
23. Swimming Pool Bylaw (MPK) 2007
24. Cyber Centre and Cyber Cafe Bylaw (MPK) 2007
25. Dog and Dog Breeding House Licensing Bylaw (MPK) 2007
26. Vandalism Bylaw (MPK) 2005
27. Islamic Grave Site Bylaw (MPK) 2005
28. Food Handling Bylaw (MPK) 2007
29. Beauty Salon and Healthcare Bylaw (MPK) 2007
30. Election Advertisement Bylaw (MPK) 2007
31. Advertisement Bylaw (MPK) 2007
32. Land Work Bylaw (MPK) 2007
33. Market Bylaw (MPK) 2007
34. Crematorium Bylaw (MPK) 2007
35. Food Establishment Licensing Bylaw (MPK) 2007
36. Private Sports Centre Bylaw (MPK) 2007

Order

1. Standing Orders (Meeting) (Klang Municipal Council) 2007
2. Road Transport (Provision of Parking Places) (Klang Municipal Council) Order 2007
3. Road Transport (Provision of Parking Places) (Amendment) (Klang Municipal Council) 2013

Methods

1. Employees Rules (Conduct and Discipline) MPK 1995
2. Methods of Appeal Board 1999
3. Tree Preservations Order Rule 2001
4. Planning Control (General) Selangor Rules 2001
5. Development Charges Rules 2010

Rules

1. Law(Squatters Cleaning) 1969
2. Food Law1985 - Food Law [Amendment] 1991 - Food Law [Amendment] 1998
3. Controlled Tobacco Law 1993
4. Entertainment and Places of Entertainment Law(Snooker and Video) (Controlled and Supervising)(Selangor) 1996
5. Entertainment and Places of Entertainment Law(Selangor) 1996

== Zone ==
State Assembly Seat	No.	Area
N40 Kota Anggerik	N40	1. Mutiara Bukit Raja 2; 2. Mutiara Bukit Raja; 3. Kawasan Perindustrian Bukit Raja
N41 Batu Tiga	N41	1. Kampung Kuantan; 2. Taman Kampung Kuantan; 3. Taman Bukit Kuda; 4. Taman Sungai Rasau; 5. Taman Rashna; 6. Kawasan Pangsapuri Bukit Kuda; 7. Kawasan Perindustrian Sungai Rasau
N42 Meru	N42A	1. Kampung Meru; 2. Klang Sentral; 3. Taman Dato’ Bandar; 4. Taman Meru III; 5. Taman Meru Utama; 6. Taman Meru Damai; 7. Taman Meru Ria; 8. Taman Meru Ria 2; 9. Taman Daya Meru; 10. Taman Berkat; 11. Taman Seri Putri; 12. Taman Saujana Meru; 13. Taman Kiai Ridzuan; 14. Taman Meru Permai; 15. Taman Desa Permai; 16. Taman Harumanis; 17. Taman Meru Jaya; 18. Taman Desa Indah; 19. Taman Desa Kencana; 20. Taman Saujana Meru; 21. Taman Meru Selatan; 22. Taman Desa Meru Indah; 23. Kawasan Perindustrian Meru; 24. Kawasan Perindustrian Meru Timur; 25. Kawasan Perindustrian Meru Selatan
N42 Meru	N42B	1. Pekan Kapar; 2. Kampung Kapar; 3. Taman Kapar Permai; 4. Taman Saga; 5. Taman Damai; 6. Taman Emas; 7. Taman Intan; 8. Taman Kapar Ria; 9. Taman Putra Baru; 10. Taman Meru IV; 11. Taman Seri Perepat; 12. Taman Sungai Kapar Indah; 13. Kapar Bestari; 14. Kawasan Perindustrian Meru Indah; 15. Kawasan Perindustrian Meru Barat; 16. Bandar Aman Perdana; 17. Kawasan Perindustrian Sungai Puloh; 18. Kawasan Industri Sungai Puloh; 19. Kawasan Perindustrian Sungai Kapar Indah
N43 Sementa	N43A	1. Kampung Sungai Serdang; 2. Kampung Tok Muda; 3. Kampung Bukit Kapar; 4. Kampung Bukit Kerayong; 5. Taman Saujana Kapar; 6. Taman Seri Serdang; 7. Taman Seri Serdang 3; 8. Taman Seri 12; 9. Taman Seri Kerayong; 10. Taman Khoo Kek Keng; 11. Taman Seri Kapar; 12. Taman Seri Wangi
N43 Sementa	N43B	1. Kampung Perepat; 2. Kampung Sementa; 3. Taman Perepat Permai; 4. Taman Tasik Sementa; 5. Pangsapuri Seri Sementa; 6. Taman Klang Perdana; 7. Taman Seri Sementa; 8. Taman Sementa Utama; 9. Taman Sementa Jaya
N43 Sementa	N43C	1. Kampung Batu 3; 2. Kampung Batu 4; 3. Kampung Rantau Panjang; 4. Kampung Sungai Pinang Bandar; 5. Taman Indah; 6. Taman Sungai Putus; 7. Taman Sungai Agas; 8. Taman Mewah Jaya; 9. Taman Teluk Kapas; 10. Taman Seri Perantau; 11. Taman Hijrah; 12. Taman Hijrah 2; 13. Taman Kelana; 14. Taman Kembara; 15. Taman Kembara 2; 16. Taman Kembara 3
N44 Selat Klang	N44A	1. Kawasan Perindustrian Bandar Baru Sultan Suleiman; 2. Bandar Sultan Suleiman; 3. Pelabuhan Utara; 4. Tanjung Harapan; 5. Kampung Baru Bagan Hailam; 6. Pulau Ketam (Kampung Baru Bagan Teo Chew & Kampung Baru Sungai Lima)
N44 Selat Klang	N44B	1. Kampung Delek; 2. Kampung Sungai Udang; 3. Kampung Teluk Gadong; 4. Kampung Raja Uda; 5. Pelabuhan Klang (sebahagian); 6. Taman Aneka Baru; 7. Taman Delek Baru; 8. Taman Seri Perantau; 9. Telok Gadong Kecil; 10. Taman Pelabuhan; 11. Taman Sungai Sireh Tambahan; 12. Pangsapuri Seri Perantau (Blok A – Blok L)
N45 Bandar Baru Klang	N45A	1. Pusat Bandar Klang Utara; 2. Taman Eng Ann; 3. Taman Berkeley; 4. Bandar Baru Klang; 5. Taman Puncak; 6. Taman Summit; 7. Bukit Kuda Heights; 8. Taman Intan; 9. Pelangi Heights; 10. Pangsapuri Mawar; 11. Pangsapuri Cempaka; 12. Pangsapuri Dahlia; 13. Pangsapuri Palm Garden; 14. Taman Bukit Engku Hassan
N45 Bandar Baru Klang	N45B	1. Taman Jasa; 2. Taman Istimewa; 3. Taman Bahagia; 4. Taman Haji Ismail; 5. Taman Bunga Melor; 6. Taman Seri Pinang; 7. Taman Pinang; 8. Taman Kelang; 9. Kampung Sungai Pinang Dalam; 10. Kampung Batu Belah
N45 Bandar Baru Klang	N45C	1. Taman Sungai Bertih; 2. Taman Wangi; 3. Taman Teluk Pulai; 4. Taman D’ Anjung; 5. Taman Tepi Sungai; 6. Jalan Tepi Sungai
N45 Bandar Baru Klang	N45D	1. Bandar Bukit Rajah; 2. Taman Klang Utama; 3. Ladang Bukit Rajah; 4. Kawasan Perindustrian Sungai Puloh
N46 Pelabuhan Klang	N46A	1. Kampung Pandamaran Jaya; 2. Kampung Idaman
N46 Pelabuhan Klang	N46B	1. Pelabuhan Selatan; 2. Taman Teluk Gedung Indah; 3. Taman Kota Pendamar; 4. Taman Kem; 5. Taman Selat Damai; 6. Taman Suria Pendamar; 7. Flat Pendamar A 8. Flat Pendamar B 9. Pangsapuri Berembang; 10. Kawasan Perindustrian Sobena Jaya
N46 Pelabuhan Klang	N46C	1. Pulau Indah (Kampung Sungai Pinang); 2. Kampung Telok Nipah; 3. Kampung Sungai Kembong; 4. Kampung Perigi Nenas; 5. Taman Laguna; 6. Bandar Armada Putera; 7. Pelabuhan Barat; 8. Kawasan Perindustrian Pulau Indah
N46 Pelabuhan Klang	N46D	1. Kampung Pendamar; 2. Kampung Air Hitam; 3. Kampung Telok Gong; 4. Kota Bayu Emas; 5. Bandar Parkland; 6. Bandar Bestari; 7. Laman Greenville; 8. Glenmarie Cove; 9. Kawasan Perindustrian Telok Gong
N47 Pandamaran	N47A	1. Pusat Bandar Klang Selatan (Jalan Tengku Kelana); 2. Jalan Stesen; 3. Jalan Raya Timur; 4. Jalan Dato’ Hamzah; 5. Jalan Istana / Taman Bandar Diraja; 6. Taman Gembira; 7. Kampung Telok Gadong; 8. Taman Teluk Pulai (Jalan Mengkuang); 9. Taman Melawis; 10. Taman Setia PRMM; 11. Taman Mohd Yamin
N47 Pandamaran	N47B	1. Taman Palm Grove; 2. Taman Petaling; 3. Taman Chi Liung; 4. Taman Bayu Perdana; 5. Taman Selatan
N47 Pandamaran	N47C	1. Kampung Baru Pandamaran; 2. Taman Razi; 3. Taman Kim Chuan; 4. Flat Chi Liung; 5. Pangsapuri Bayu Perdana; 6. Pangsapuri Prima Bayu; 7. Pangsapuri Vista Bayu; 8. Pangsapuri Sri Angkasa; 9. Kompleks Sukan Pandamaran
N47 Pandamaran	N47D	1. Kampung Raja Uda (Jalan Bunga Raya & Jalan Kastam); 2. Kampung Baru Pandamaran (Jalan Papan); 3. Taman Tengku Bendahara Azman; 4. Pangsapuri Klang Villa; 5. Flat Bunga Raya; 6. Flat Pandamaran; 7. Pelabuhan Klang (Jalan Tengku Badar, Jalan Berangan & Jalan Beringin); 8. Kawasan Perindustrian Pandamaran
N48 Sentosa	N48A	1. Bandar Bukit Tinggi; 2. Bandar Bukit Tinggi 2; 3. Bandar Botanik; 4. Taman Pendamar Indah; 5. Taman Pendamar Indah 2
N48 Sentosa	N48B	1. Taman Desawan; 2. Taman Klang Jaya; 3. Taman Sentosa (Jalan Yusof Shahbudin); 4. Jalan Laksamana; 5. Jalan Dato’ Dagang; 6. Jalan Hulubalang; 7. Jalan Dato’ Abdul Hamid; 8. Kawasan Perindustrian Klang Jaya
N48 Sentosa	N48C	1. Taman Seri Mewah; 2. Taman Menara Maju; 3. Taman Sungai Jati Permai; 4. Taman Bunga Raya; 5. Taman Saga; 6. Taman Sentosa (Jalan Bendahara, Jalan Temenggung, Jalan Bentara & Jalan Samarinda); 7. Taman Maznah; 8. Taman Mesra; 9. Taman Seri Indah 1
N49 Sungai Kandis	N49A	1. Kampung Jawa; 2. Kampung Teluk Menegun (Sebahagian); 3. Taman Seri Andalas; 4. Taman Shah Bandar; 5. Taman Desa Indah; 6. Taman Berjaya; 7. Taman Seri Menegun; 8. Taman Alam Shah; 9. Taman Bukit Jati
N49 Sungai Kandis	N49B	1. Kampung Johan Setia; 2. Bandar Botanik (Ambang Botanic); 3. Bandar Puteri; 4. Bandar Putera; 5. Bandar Putera 2; 6. Taman Setia; 7. Taman Setia Permai

== Constituencies ==
- Kapar (federal constituency)
  - Meru (state constituency)
  - Sementa (state constituency)
  - Selat Klang (state constituency)
- Klang (federal constituency)
  - Pelabuhan Klang (state constituency)
  - Bandar Baru Klang (state constituency)
  - Pandamaran (state constituency)
- Kota Raja (federal constituency)
  - Sentosa (state constituency)
  - Sungai Kandis (state constituency) (some area)
