= Taman Sri Muda =

- Township
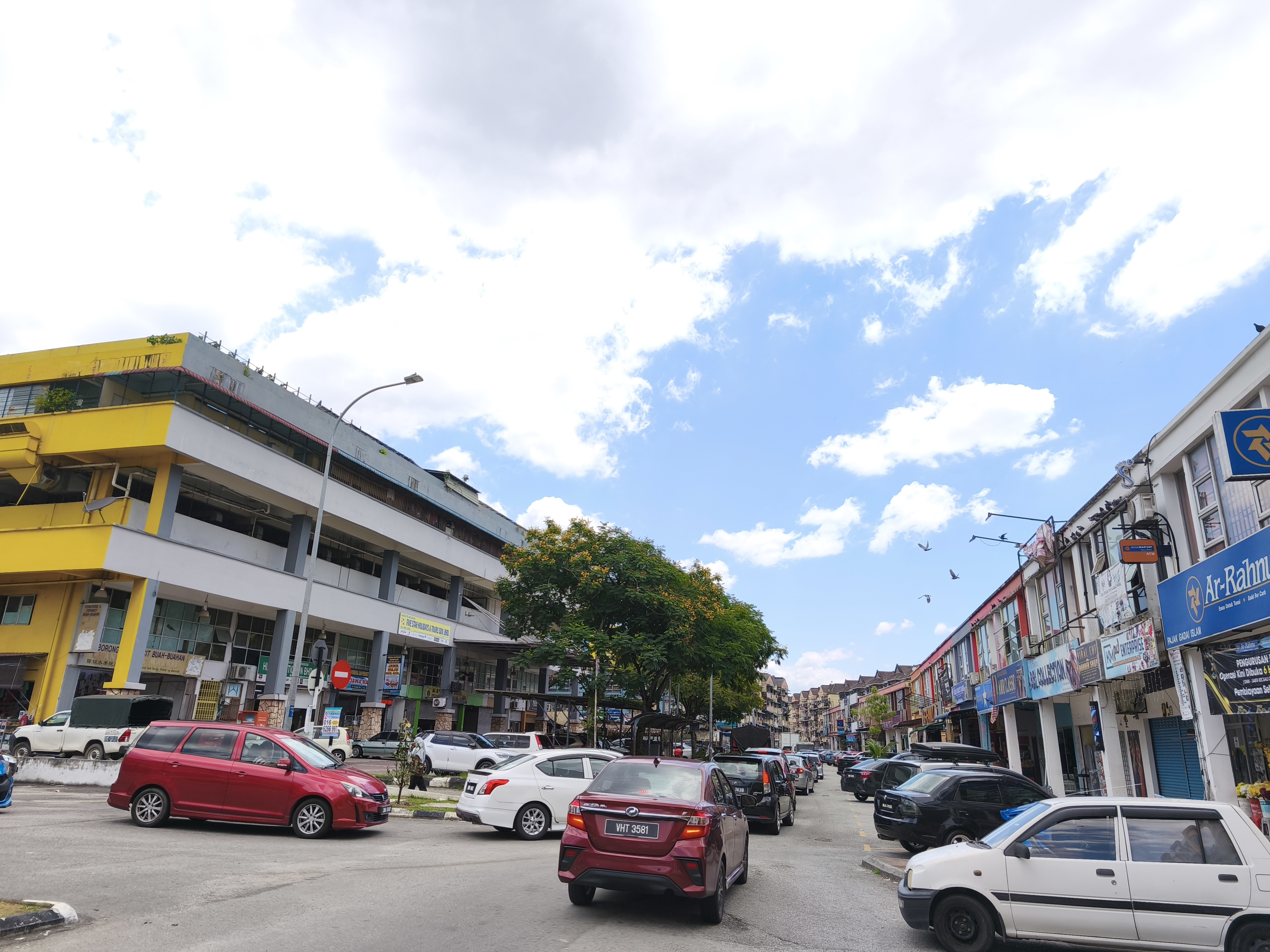

- Taman Sri Muda (Peninsular Malaysia)
- Coordinates: 3°1′57.07″N 101°32′4.11″E
- Country: Malaysia
- State: Selangor
- Time zone: UTC+8 (MST)
  - Summer (DST): Not observed
- Postal code: 40470
- Calling code: 03
- Website: kotakemuning.online

Sri Muda is a major township in Section 25, Shah Alam, Selangor, Malaysia. This township is located in Klang District at the south of Shah Alam, between Kota Kemuning and Alam Megah.

== Economy ==
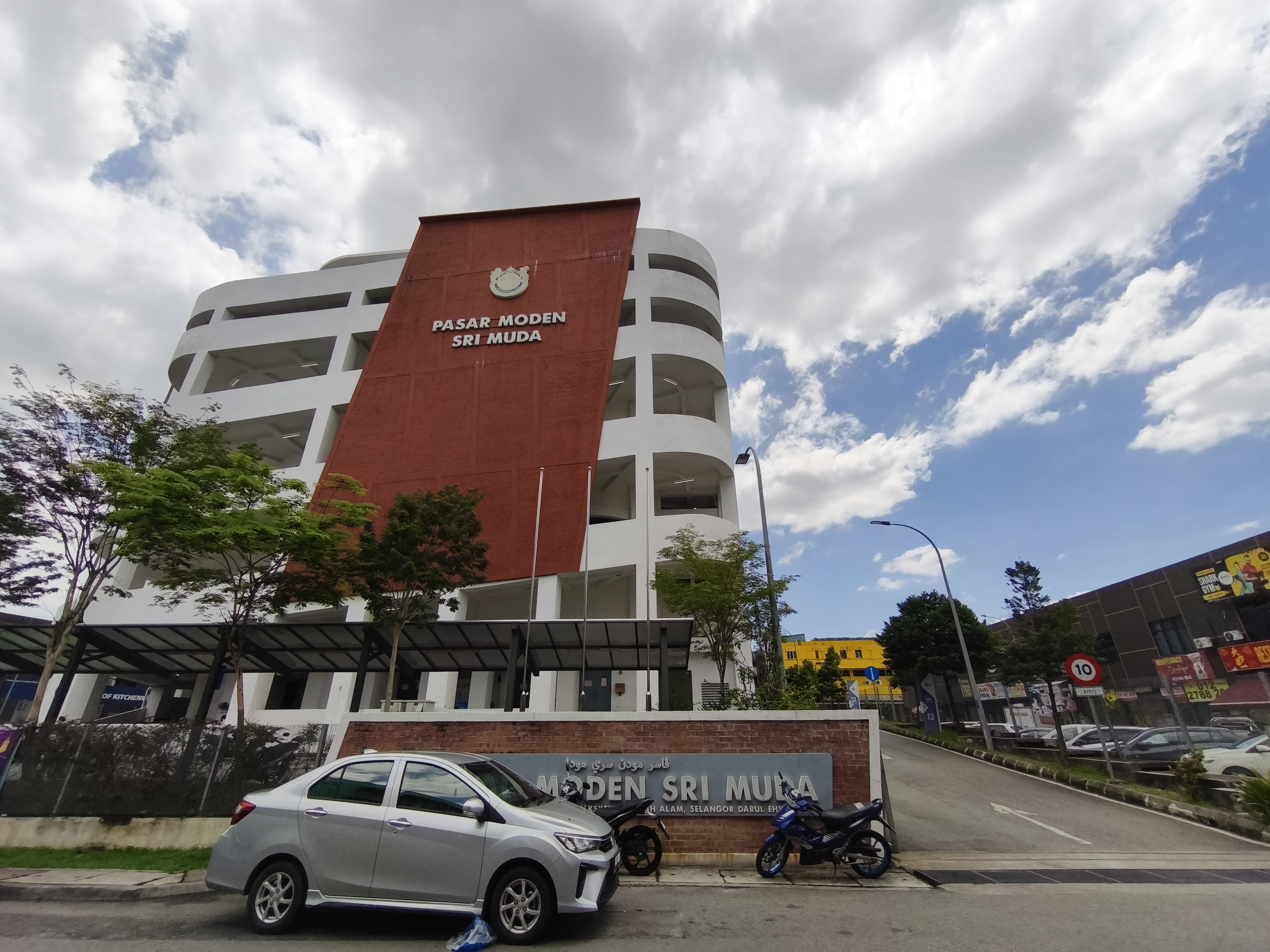
Sri Muda Modern Market

=== Sri Muda Modern Market ===
The Sri Muda Modern Market (Malay: Pasar Moden Sri Muda), a six-story complex located at Jalan Mewah 25/63 in Shah Alam, opened in March 2021 following construction that began in 2017 and was completed in December 2020 at a total cost of RM28 million. Completed on 15 December 2020 after 4.5 years of construction, the project received RM25 million in interest-free loans from the Selangor state government.

The market features 219 trading lots – an increase from its predecessor – The market comprises 60 halal wet-market units, four non-halal units, 56 dry-market units, 79 food-and-beverage stalls, 18 kiosks and 32 cold-storage rooms. Its six-storey building includes three levels of parking, with 216 parking spaces, The parking area has also been made available to residents as a higher-ground parking area during flood risks. Additional facilities include prayer rooms, waste disposal systems, 14 CCTV units, and plans for future free WiFi installation.

To support vendors during the COVID-19 pandemic, the Shah Alam City Council waived licensing fees, requiring only monthly rental payments (RM300–RM500 depending on stall type). The market replaced temporary trading areas established after the demolition of the original market, whose private land is slated for redevelopment.

== Access ==
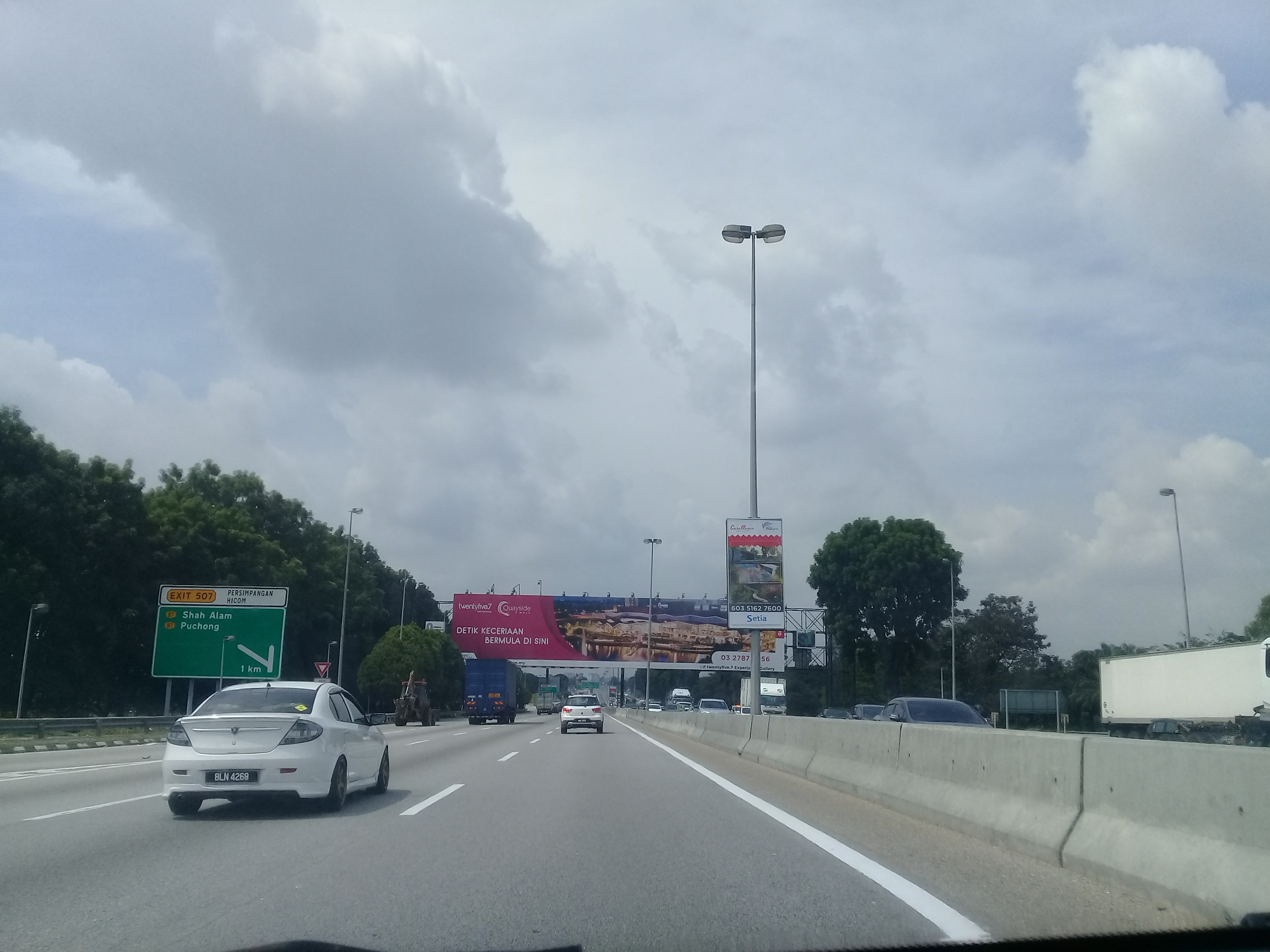
HICOM Interchange from KESAS highway is accessible to Taman Sri Muda.

=== Car ===
It is accessible via major highways such as the KESAS (Exit 507) and the Kemuning–Shah Alam Highway (Exit 1302), linking Taman Sri Muda to downtown Shah Alam opened in 2010.

=== Public transportation ===
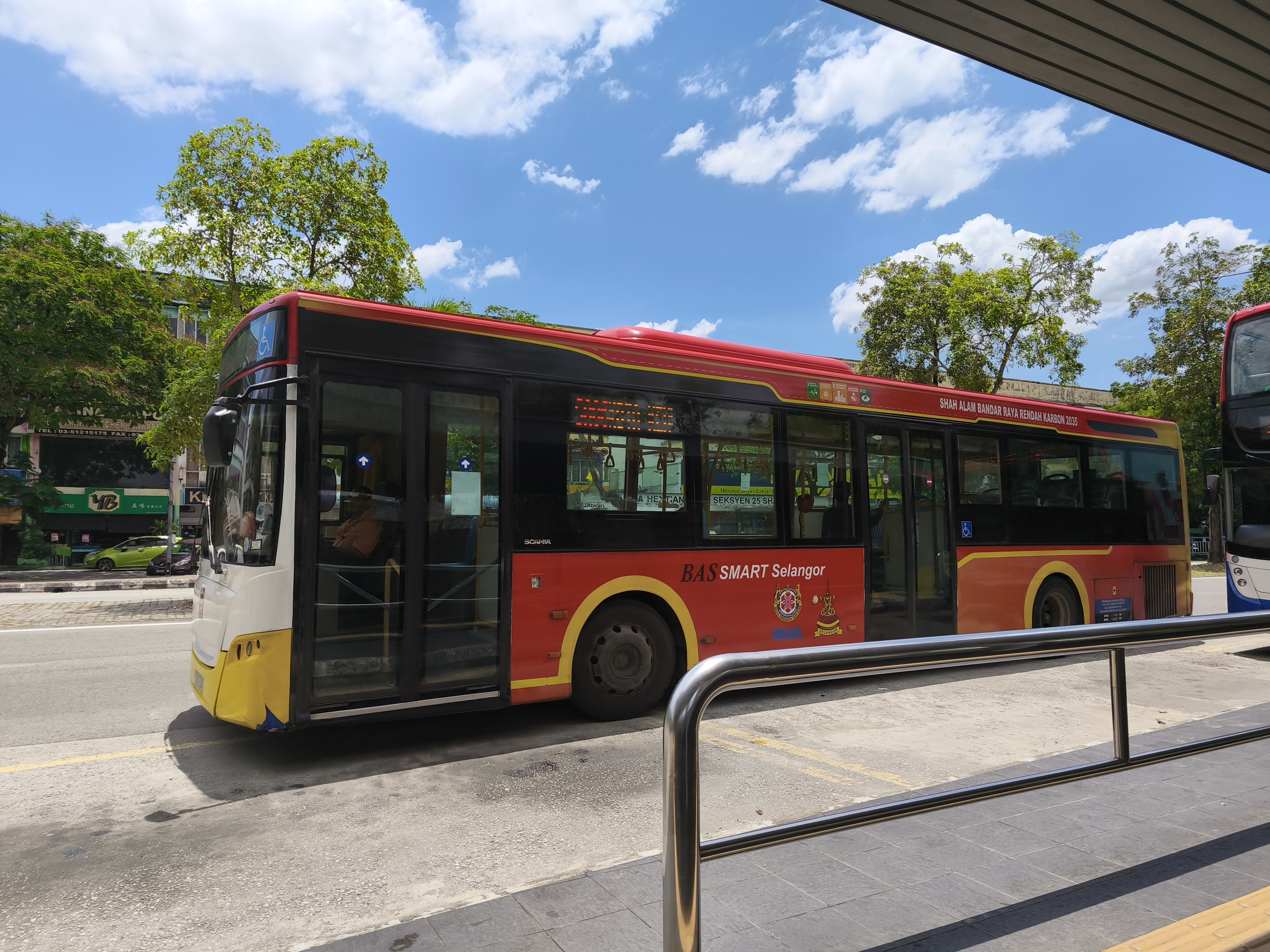
Smart Selangor SA06 at Taman Sri Muda Bus Hub

Alam Megah LRT station and Shah Alam Komuter station are the closest rail stations to Taman Sri Muda. The Smart Selangor bus route SA06 connects the area to Shah Alam Komuter station, while interchange it to Kota Kemuning to route SA08 will link to Alam Megah LRT station.

RapidKL bus T756 operates a loop service between Hentian Bandar Shah Alam (Section 14) and Taman Sri Muda. For direct access to Kuala Lumpur, RapidKL bus 751 connects Taman Sri Muda to Pasar Seni via the Federal Highway.
