= Ministry of Finance (Malaysia) =

Government ministry of Malaysia

- Kementerian Kewangan كمنترين كواڠن (MOF)
- Coat of arms of Malaysia

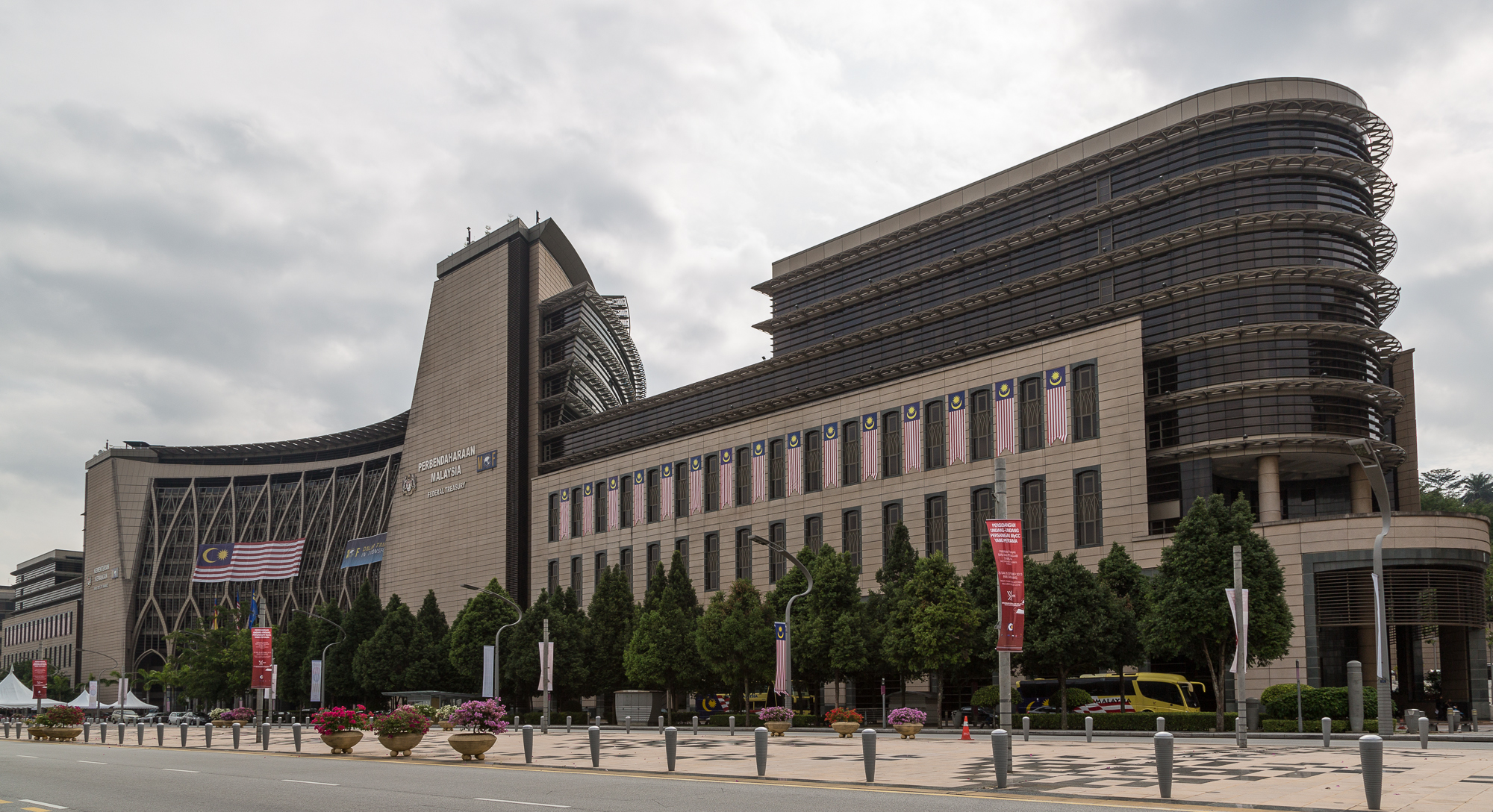

Ministry overview
- Formed: 31 August 1957; 68 years ago
- Jurisdiction: Government of Malaysia
- Headquarters: Ministry of Finance Complex, No. 5, Persiaran Perdana, Precinct 2, Federal Government Administrative Centre, 62592 Putrajaya
- Employees: 30,735 (2022)
- Annual budget: MYR 46,981,917,800 (2026)
- Ministers responsible: Dato' Seri Anwar bin Ibrahim, Minister of Finance; Datuk Seri Amir Hamzah bin Azizan, Minister of Finance II
- Deputy Minister responsible: Liew Chin Tong, Deputy Minister of Finance
- Ministry executives: Datuk Johan Mahmood bin Merican, Secretary-General of Treasury; Dato' Zamzuri bin Abdul Aziz, Deputy Secretary-General of Treasury (Policy); Datuk Ramzi bin Mansor, Deputy Secretary-General of Treasury (Management); Datuk Dr. Shahrazat binti Haji Ahmad, Deputy Secretary-General of Treasury (Investment)
- Website: www.mof.gov.my

Footnotes
- Ministry of Finance on Facebook

The Ministry of Finance (Malay: Kementerian Kewangan; Jawi: كمنترين كواڠن), abbreviated MOF, is a ministry of the Government of Malaysia that is charged with the responsibility for government expenditure and revenue raising. The ministry's role is to develop economic policy and prepare the Malaysian federal budget. The Ministry of Finance also oversees financial legislation and regulation. Each year in October, the Minister of Finance presents the Malaysian federal budget to the Parliament.

The Minister of Finance administers his functions through the Ministry of Finance and a range of other government agencies.

Its headquarters is in Ministry of Finance Complex, Putrajaya.

== Duties and importance ==
The Minister of Finance is the minister in charge of government revenue and expenditure. The Minister oversees economic policy: fiscal policy is within the Minister's direct responsibility, while monetary policy is implemented by the politically independent Central Bank of Malaysia, the head of which is appointed by the Yang di-Pertuan Agong. The Minister of Finance also oversees financial legislation and regulation. Each year in October, the Minister of Finance presents the Malaysian federal budget to the Parliament.

The Minister of Finance is a very senior government post; historically, many Ministers of Finance have previously, concurrently or subsequently served as prime minister or deputy prime minister. Service as Minister of Finance is seen as an important (though certainly not essential) qualification for serving as prime minister: to date, five Ministers of Finance have gone on to be prime minister.

== Organisation ==
=== Ministry ===
- Minister of Finance
  - Deputy Minister
    - Secretary-General of Treasury
      - Under the Authority of Secretary-General of Treasury
        - Special Commissioners of Income Tax
        - Legal Division
        - Customs Appeal Tribunal
        - Corporate Strategy and Communication Division
        - Treasury Internal Audit Unit
        - Integrity Unit
        - GST Appeal Tribunal
      - Deputy Secretary-General of Treasury (Policy)
        - National Budget Office
        - International Division
        - Fiscal and Economics Division
        - Tax Division
        - Registrar Office of Credit Reporting Agencies (Official site)
      - Deputy Secretary-General of Treasury (Management)
        - Remuneration Policy and Management Division
        - Government Procurement Division
        - Sabah Federal Treasury (Official site)
        - Sarawak Federal Treasury (Official site)
        - Information Technology Division
      - Deputy Secretary-General of Treasury (Investment)
        - Public Asset Management Division
        - Government Investment Companies Division
        - Statutory Body Strategic Management Division
        - Strategic Investment Division

=== Federal departments ===
1. Federal Treasury, or Perbendaharaan Malaysia.
2. Royal Malaysian Customs Department (RMCD), or Jabatan Kastam Diraja Malaysia. (Official site)
3. Accountant General’s Department of Malaysia, or Jabatan Akauntan Negara Malaysia (JANM). (Official site)
4. Valuation and Property Services Department, or Jabatan Penilaian dan Perkhidmatan Harta (JPPH). (Official site)

=== Federal agencies ===
1. Inland Revenue Board of Malaysia, or Lembaga Hasil Dalam Negeri (LHDN). (Official site)
2. Langkawi Development Authority (LADA), or Lembaga Pembangunan Langkawi. (Official site)
3. Malaysian Totalisator Board, or Lembaga Totalisator Malaysia.
4. Public Sector Home Financing Board, or Lembaga Pembiayaan Perumahan Sektor Awam (LPPSA). (Official site)
5. Labuan International Business and Financial Centre, or Pusat Perniagaan dan Kewangan Antarabangsa Labuan. (Official site)
6. Securities Commission Malaysia (SC), or Suruhanjaya Sekuriti Malaysia. (Official site)
7. Employees Provident Fund (EPF), or Kumpulan Wang Simpanan Pekerja (KWSP). (Official site)
8. Retirement Fund (Incorporated), or Kumpulan Wang Persaraan (Diperbadankan) (KWAP). (Official site)
9. Bursa Malaysia Berhad. (Official site)
10. National Savings Bank, or Bank Simpanan Nasional (BSN). (Official site)
11. Central Bank of Malaysia, or Bank Negara Malaysia (BNM). (Official site)
12. Tun Razak Foundation, or Yayasan Tun Razak. (Official site)
13. Malaysian Deposit Insurance Corporation or Perbadanan Insurans Deposit Malaysia (PIDM). (Official site)

== Key legislation ==
The Ministry of Finance is responsible for administration of several key Acts:

- Income Tax Act 1967 [Act 53]
- Financial Procedure Act 1957 [Act 61]
- Sales Tax Act 1972 [Act 64]
- Gaming Tax Act 1972 [Act 65]
- Accountants Act 1967 [Act 94]
- Bank Simpanan Nasional Act 1974 [Act 146]
- Service Tax Act 1975 [Act 151]
- Islamic Development Bank Act 1975 [Act 153]
- Real Property Gains Tax Act 1976 [Act 169]
- Excise Act 1976 [Act 176]
- Tun Razak Foundation Act 1976 [Act 178]
- Treasury Bills (Local) Act 1946 [Act 188]
- Betting and Sweepstake Duties Act 1948 [Act 201]
- Customs Act 1967 [Act 235]
- Treasury Deposit Receipts Act 1952 [Act 236]
- Valuers, Appraisers and Estate Agents Act 1981 [Act 242]
- Lotteries Act 1952 [Act 288]
- Goods Vehicle Levy Act 1983 [Act 294]
- Promotion of Investments Act 1986 [Act 327]
- Finance (Banking and Financial Institutions) Act 1986 [Act 330]
- Unclaimed Moneys Act 1965 [Act 370]
- Minister of Finance (Incorporation) Act 1957 [Act 375]
- Stamp Act 1949 [Act 378]
- Pool Betting Act 1967 [Act 384]
- External Loans Act 1963 [Act 403]
- Development Funds Act 1966 [Act 406]
- Lembaga Pembangunan Langkawi Act 1990 [Act 423]
- Free Zones Act 1990 [Act 438]
- Labuan Companies Act 1990 [Act 441]
- Labuan Business Activity Tax Act 1990 [Act 445]
- Employees Provident Fund Act 1991 [Act 452]
- Securities Industry (Central Depositories) Act 1991 [Act 453]
- Bretton Woods Agreements Act 1957 [Act 472]
- Securities Commission Act 1993 [Act 498]
- Inland Revenue Board of Malaysia Act 1995 [Act 533]
- Petroleum (Income Tax) Act 1967 [Act 543]
- Labuan Offshore Financial Services Authority Act 1996 [Act 545]
- Labuan Offshore Trusts Act 1996 [Act 554]
- Financial Reporting Act 1997 [Act 558]
- Pengurusan Danaharta Nasional Berhad Act 1998 [Act 587]
- Windfall Profit Levy Act 1998 [Act 592]
- Anti-Money Laundering, Anti-Terrorism Financing and Proceeds of Unlawful Activities Act 2001 [Act 613]
- Development Financial Institutions Act 2002 [Act 618]
- Islamic Financial Services Board Act 2002 [Act 623]
- Demutualisation (Kuala Lumpur Stock Exchange) Act 2003 [Act 632]
- Retirement Fund Act 2007 [Act 662]
- Capital Markets and Services Act 2007 [Act 671]
- Central Bank of Malaysia Act 2009 [Act 701]
- Labuan Financial Services and Securities Act 2010 [Act 704]
- Labuan Islamic Financial Services and Securities Act 2010 [Act 705]
- Labuan Foundations Act 2010 [Act 706]
- Labuan Limited Partnerships and Limited Liability Partnerships Act 2010 [Act 707]
- Credit Reporting Agencies Act 2010 [Act 710]
- Malaysia Deposit Insurance Corporation Act 2011 (Akta Perbadanan Insurans Deposit Malaysia)[Act 720]
- Money Services Business Act 2011 [Act 731]
- Financial Services Act 2013 [Act 758]
- Islamic Financial Services Act 2013 [Act 759]
- Goods and Services Tax Act 2014 [Act 762]
- Netting of Financial Agreements Act 2015 [Act 766]
- Public Sector Home Financing Board Act 2015 [Act 767]

== Client's charter ==
1. To prepare annual estimated expenditure to be tabled in the parliament by the specified date.
2. To prepare handbook of Federal Government Revenue Budget to be tabled in the parliament on budget day.
3. To prepare annual economic report to be tabled with the budget speech and quarterly periodic economic report.
4. To ensure the performance achievement of operational and liabilities and development expenditure in average will exceed 85% of the approved annual allocation under treasury’s control.
5. To ensure the registration of the common areas supply and service contractor for new application and areas-add be approved within seven working days whilst application for profile update within three working days.
6. To approve a complete first housing loan application of the government servant within three working days and to issue the progress payment within twenty-one (21) working days from the date of the claim approved.
7. To manage the disbursement of Federal Government to the state governments, companies, half statutory bodies and other agencies within fourteen days from the date of receipt.
8. To issue the establishment warrant within the specified period from the date of receipt of a complete PSD certificate as follows:
  1. Establishment warrant which involves 50 or fewer items changed is issued within five working days; and
  2. Establishment warrant which involves more than 50 items changed is issued within ten working days.
9. To ensure all public complaints be given initial feedback within 1 working day from the date of receipt.

== Legal framework ==
The Federal Constitution allows Parliament to make laws related to finance that include:

- currency, legal tender and coinage;
- national savings and savings banks;
- borrowing on the security of the Federal Consolidated Fund;
- loans to or borrowing by the States, public authorities and private enterprise;
- public debt of the Federation;
- financial and accounting procedure, including procedure for the collection, custody and payment of the public moneys of the Federation and of the States, and the purchase, custody and disposal of public property other than land of the Federation and of the States;
- audit and accounts of the Federation and the States and other public authorities;
- taxes; rates in the federal capital;
- fees in respect of any of the matters in the Federal List or dealt with by federal law;
- banking; money-lending; pawnbrokers; control of credit;
- bills of exchange, cheques, promissory notes and other similar instruments;
- foreign exchange; and
- capital issues; stock and commodity exchanges.

== Ministers ==
Minister	Portrait	Office	Executive Experience
Anwar Ibrahim		Minister of Finance	MP for Permatang Pauh (March 1982 – April 1999; August 2008 – March 2015); MP for Port Dickson (September 2019 – November 2022); MP for Tambun (November 2022 – current); Deputy Minister in the Prime Minister's Department (April 1982 – June 1983); Minister of Culture, Youth and Sports (June 1983 – July 1984); Minister of Agriculture (July 1984 – August 1986); Minister of Education (August 1986 – March 1991); Minister of Finance (March 1991 – September 1998; December 2022 – current); Deputy Prime Minister (December 1993 – September 1998); Leader of the Opposition (August 2008 – March 2015; May 2020 – November 2022); Prime Minister (November 2022 – current)
Amir Hamzah Azizan		Minister of Finance	Chief Executive Officer of the Employees Provident Fund (March 2021 – December 2023); Senator (December 2023 – current)
Liew Chin Tong		Deputy Minister of Finance	MP for Bukit Bendera (March 2008 – May 2013); MP for Kluang (May 2013 – May 2018); Senator (July 2018 – July 2021); Deputy Minister of Defence (July 2018 – February 2020); MLA for Perling (March 2022 – current); State Leader of the Opposition of Johor (April 2022 – December 2022); MP for Iskandar Puteri (November 2022 – current); Deputy Minister of International Trade and Industry (December 2022 – April 2023); Deputy Minister of Investment, Trade and Industry (April 2023 – December 2025)

== See also ==
- Minister of Finance (Malaysia)
- Minister of Finance (Incorporated)
- Digital Nasional Berhad
- MOF F.C.
- MOF-Sungai Merab F.C.
