= Putra Heights LRT station =

Light rapid transit station in Putra Heights, Subang Jaya, Selangor, Malaysia

SP31 KJ37 Putra Heights
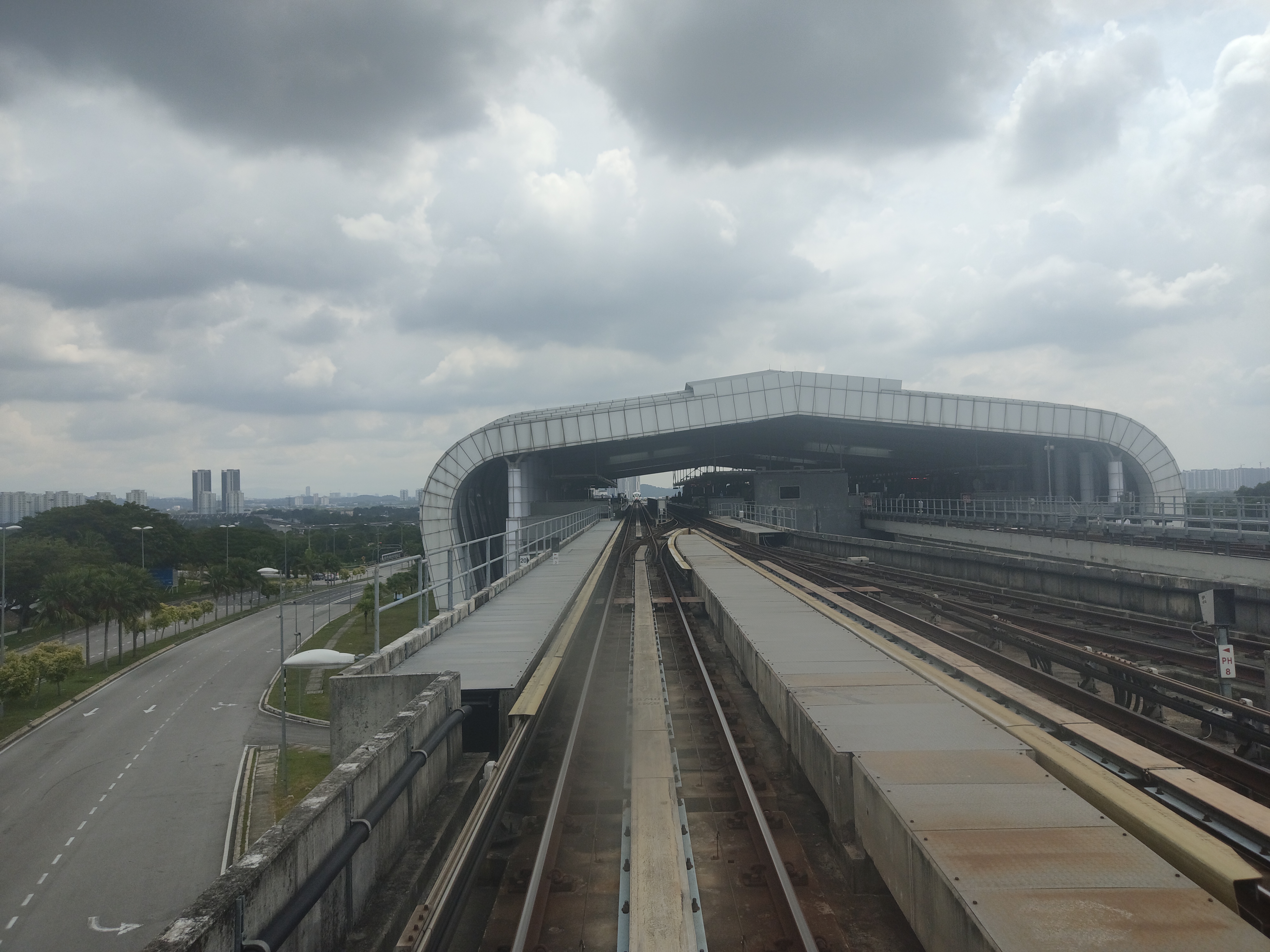
- View of the station from an approaching train on the Kelana Jaya Line

General information
- Other names: Malay: ڤوترا هايتس (Jawi); Chinese: 布特拉高原; Tamil: புத்ரா அயிட்ஸ்
- Location: Putra Point Commercial Center, Persiaran Putra Indah, Putra Heights; 47650 Subang Jaya; Selangor; Malaysia
- Coordinates: 2°59′45.8″N 101°34′32.0″E
- System: Rapid KL
- Owner: Prasarana Malaysia
- Operator: Rapid Rail
- Lines: 4 Sri Petaling Line; 5 Kelana Jaya Line
- Platforms: 1 island platform and 2 side platforms
- Tracks: 4
- Connections: Integrative station between SP31 and KJ37

Construction
- Structure type: Elevated
- Parking: Available, 452 parking bays
- Accessible: Available

Other information
- Station code: SP31 KJ37

History
- Opened: 30 June 2016; 10 years ago

Services
Preceding station		Following station
Puchong Prima towards Sentul Timur	Sri Petaling Line	Terminus
Subang Alam towards Gombak	Kelana Jaya Line	Terminus
Location

Putra Heights LRT station is an integrated light rapid transit (LRT) station located in the township of Putra Heights in southern Subang Jaya, Selangor, Malaysia. It is the southern terminus for both the Sri Petaling Line and Kelana Jaya Line and is part of the Klang Valley Integrated Transit System.

The station is part of the Prasarana Malaysia's rail extension for both the Sri Petaling Line and Kelana Jaya Line, which provided an interchange between both lines after the Masjid Jamek LRT station. The station opened on 30 June 2016, along with 14 other stations in the extension plan.

== History ==
The extension of both the Sri Petaling Line and Kelana Jaya Line were announced on 29 August 2006 by then government. This was also confirmed by then Prime Minister Abdullah Ahmad Badawi in his National Budget speech in 2006.

Construction started in 2010. However, during the construction of the train depot, the concrete formwork and scaffolding with a height of 6 metres collapsed, killing two construction workers. Four other workers suffered minor injuries in the accident.

The construction of the station had also received complaints and objections by both Subang Alam and Putra Heights residents. A study by the National University of Malaysia (UKM) Professor Dr. Tajul Anuar Jamaluddin, whose opinion was sought by the residents, found the area to be unsuitable as the ground was largely made up of clay and cracked granite, which would be precarious and make it expensive to lay rail tracks. The line would also pass by an artificial lake and an electric transmission line, posing danger to nearby houses.

The station was opened by Najib Razak, then Prime Minister of Malaysia. Transport Minister Liow Tiong Lai, Land Public Transport Commission Chairman Syed Hamid Albar and Chief Secretary to the Government Ali Hamsa were also present at the opening.

In 2019, then Minister of Transportation opened an airport shuttle route from the station to the Kuala Lumpur International Airport's Terminal 1 and Terminal 2 (then known as KLIA and klia2 respectively). But later on 18 November 2020, RapidKL on its Facebook page issued a notice that airport shuttle route number E1 had been discontinued effectively on 1 December 2020. Passengers were advised to take an alternative bus operator, Jetbus.

=== Incidents and accidents ===
A taekwondo athlete was sued for assaulting a disabled senior citizen in the station. The athlete, Nur Dhia Liyana Shaharuddin, who won a silver medal at the 2017 Southeast Asian Games, was asked to issue a public apology to a 71-year-old partially blind and deaf man for kicking him in the station.

In November 2019, a woman who was waiting on the platform of the station, almost got hypnotized by an elderly man. The woman was able to escape with the help of two other men waiting at the platform. She then shared her experience on Facebook.

== Station features ==
=== Location ===
The station is located on the intersection of Persiaran Putra Indah and Persiaran Putra Perdana, nearby towards the exit to the North–South Expressway Central Link (ELITE) highway. Nearby places include Kampung Kuala Sungai Baru, Laman Putra, Putra Indah and Putra Point Commercial Centre.

=== Station design ===
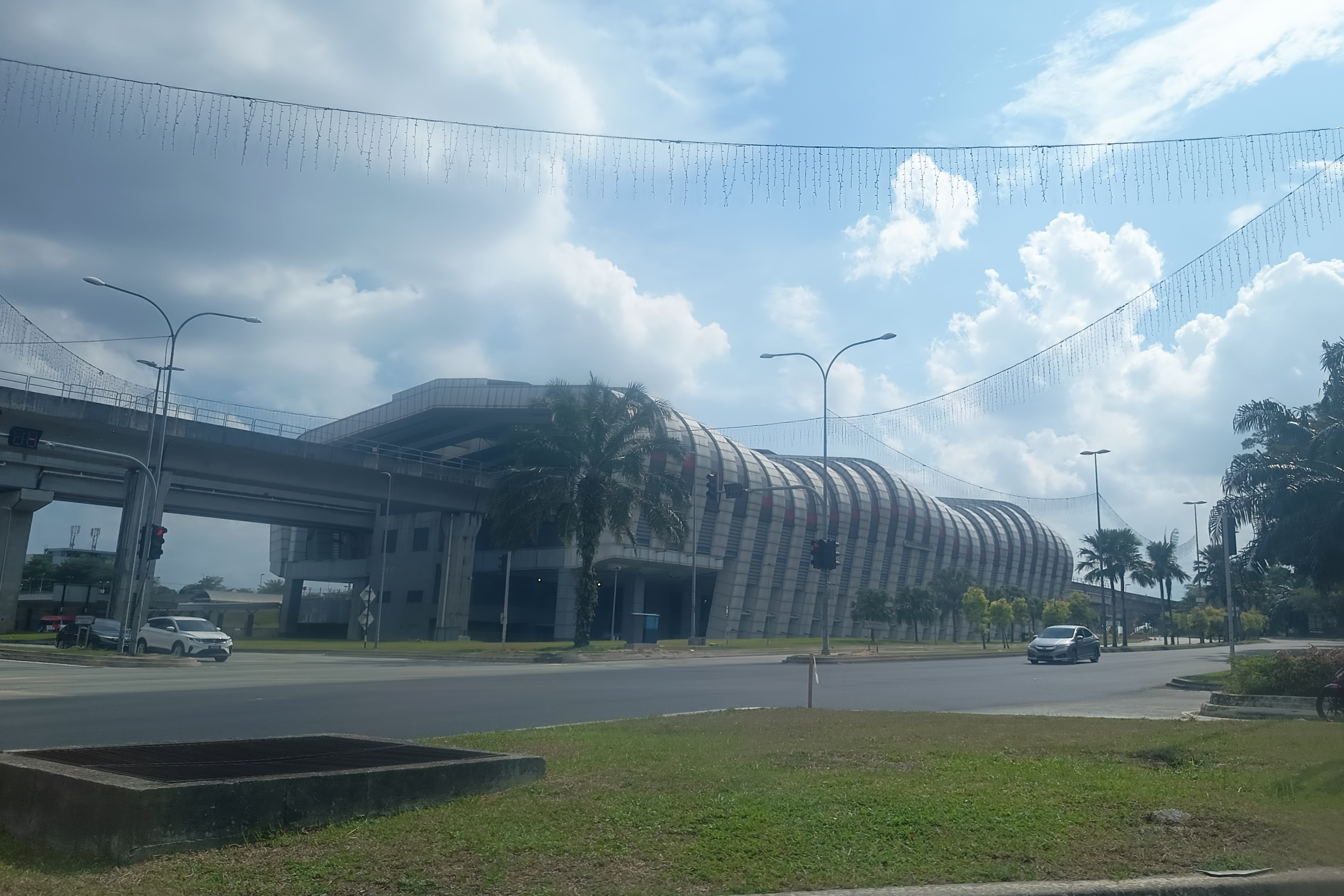
Putra Heights LRT Station in 2026

The station is designed by NRY Architects, who are also responsible for the Awan Besar and Taman Perindustrian Puchong stations on the Sri Petaling Line.

The station is inspired by the traditional fish trap called the Bubu. Instead of trapping, the station has been designed as a celebration of movement to showcase its function as an interchange station. The station's architecture has become the new landmark and a point of reference in the neighbourhood of Putra Heights.

The station's skeletal structure is covered with photovoltaic cladding to generate solar energy. Glass louvers are added for a naturally-lit interior and shade during rainy seasons. Voids are realised on certain locations of both facades to allow sufficient cross ventilation and constant airflow within the station. As some heat is trapped inside the building, a customised jacked roof concept is implemented across the central spine of the envelope to channel it out.

Platform-screen doors are being installed at this station as of october 2026

=== Station layout ===
The station is one of the largest in the Klang Valley. It has four tracks with one island platform and two side platforms. Due to both lines having different rail systems, they do not share the same track and use their own individual tracks instead.

The station has an island platform (1A and 1B) in the middle and two side platforms (2 and 3). Most of the time, trains stop at platforms 1A and 1B and turn back, unless the train terminates at this station. The station also has a dedicated Park N' Ride facility, which can accommodate up to 452 private cars, a bus terminal at the ground level, and a main drop-off and pick-up areas at the concourse level.

The middle island platform allows cross-platform interchange between the Sri Petaling Line and Kelana Jaya Line.

L2	Platform level	Side platform, doors will open on the left
L2	Platform level	Platform 2:	Not in service, trains terminate here at times
L2	Platform level	Platform 1A:	5 Kelana Jaya Line towards KJ1 Gombak (←)
L2	Platform level	Island platform, doors will open on the right
L2	Platform level	Platform 1B:	4 Sri Petaling Line towards AG1 SP1 Sentul Timur (→)
L2	Platform level	Platform 3:	Not in service, trains terminate here at times
L2	Platform level	Side platform, doors will open on the left
L1	Concourse level	Faregates, ticketing machines, customer service office, vending machines, stairs/escalators/lifts to platform level, stairs/escalators/lifts to ground level, station entrance
G	Station entrance	Stairs/escalators/lifts to concourse level, station entrance, carpark
LG	Street level	Exit to Persiaran Putra Indah and Persiaran Putra Perdana, taxi lay-by, kiss-and-ride lay-by, feeder bus hub, bus stop

== Bus services ==
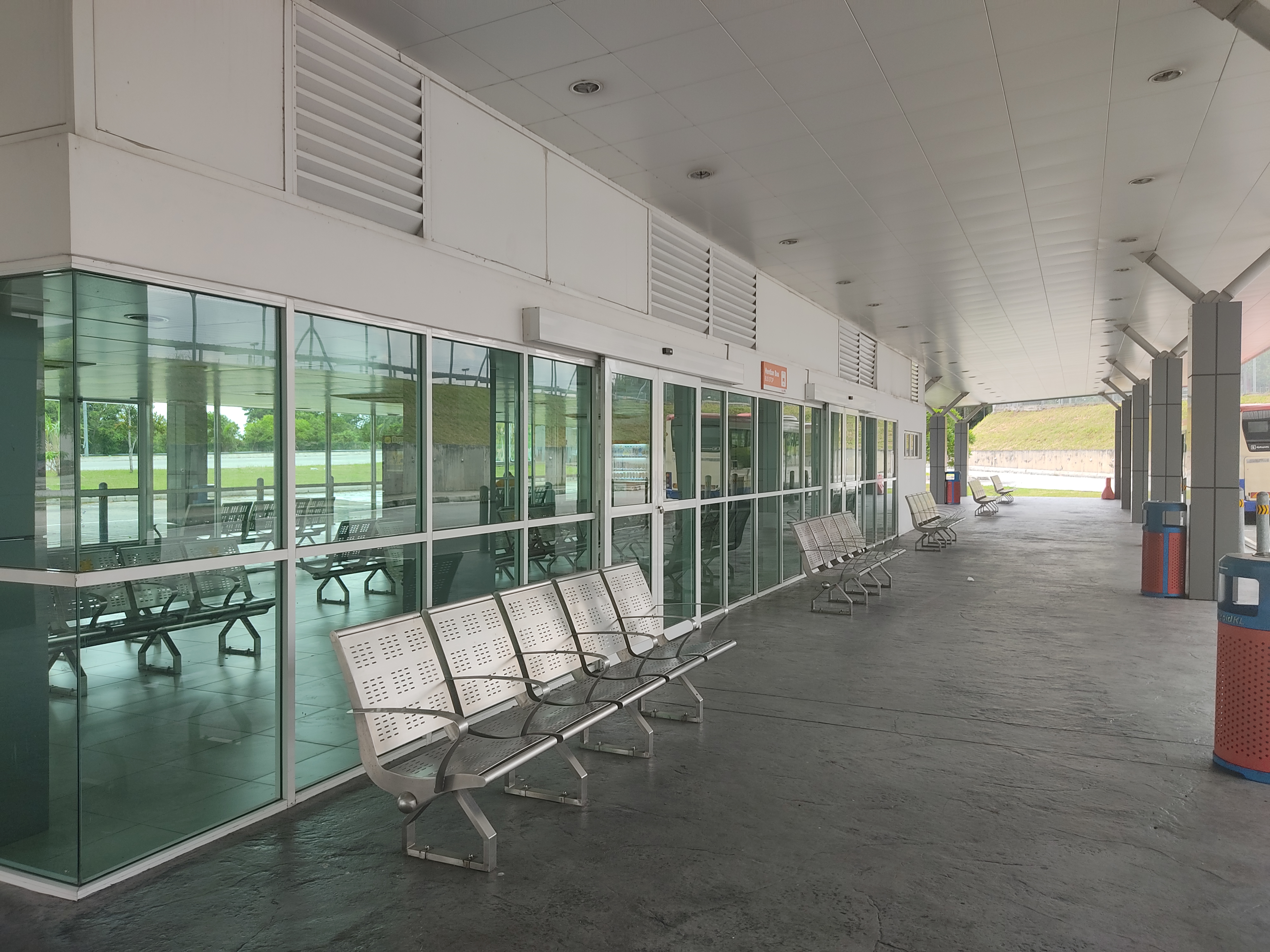
Putra Heights LRT station bus stop

=== Feeder buses ===
There are no Rapid KL operated feeder bus services (other than trunk bus 752); they used to operate route T759 (LRT Putra Heights-Kampung Bukit Lanchong). However, it has been discontinued since 1 November 2020. The Bandar Saujana Putra shuttle is handled by Mitways Transport & Tours and operates on weekdays only.

Route No.	Origin	Destination	Via	Connecting to
T760	SP31 KJ37 Putra Heights	Bandar Saujana Putra	Persiaran Putra Perdana (Giant Putra Heights); Persiaran Petaling (Pangsapuri Sri Muitara); Persiaran Putra Indah; North–South Expressway Central Link; Jalan Saujana Putra; Jalan SP2 (MAHSA University); Persiaran Saujana Putra Utama	Terminus

=== Express bus ===
Bus operator	Origin	Destination	Via	Connecting to
Jetbus	SP31 KJ37 Putra Heights	Kuala Lumpur International Airport (Terminal 1 and Terminal 2) ( KE2 KT5 KLIA T1)	North–South Expressway Central Link	Terminus

=== Other buses ===
Route No.	Origin	Destination	Via	Connecting to
752	SP31 KJ37 Putra Heights	Hentian Bandar Shah Alam	Persiaran Putra Perdana (Giant Putra Heights); Persiaran Petaling (Pangsapuri Sri Muitara); Persiaran Kuala Langat (Section 28); Persiaran Sepang; Persiaran Klang (Section 27); KJ35 Alam Megah; Persiaran Kuala Selangor; Persiaran Tengku Ampuan; Persiaran Kayangan; Persiaran Dato Menteri	708, 750, 753, T752, T753, T754, T755, T756, SA02

=== On-demand routes ===
Rapid KL on-demand van routes are available at this station.

Route No.	Origin	Destination	Via	Booking App
T736B	SP31 KJ37 Putra Heights	Bandar Rimbayu; Bandar Saujana Putra	North–South Expressway Central Link; Jalan Saujana Putra; Jalan SP2 (MAHSA University); Persiaran Saujana Putra; Persiaran Bayu; Persiaran Rimbayu (Quayside Mall); Persiaran Eco Santuari	Kummute
T752B	SP31 KJ37 Putra Heights	Putra Heights; Alam Megah; Kampung Bukit Lanchong	Persiaran Putra Perdana (Giant Putra Heights); Persiaran Petaling (Pangsapuri Sri Muitara); Persiaran Kuala Langat (Section 28); Persiaran Sepang; Persiaran Klang (Section 27); Kampung Bukit Lanchong	Mobi

== Gallery ==
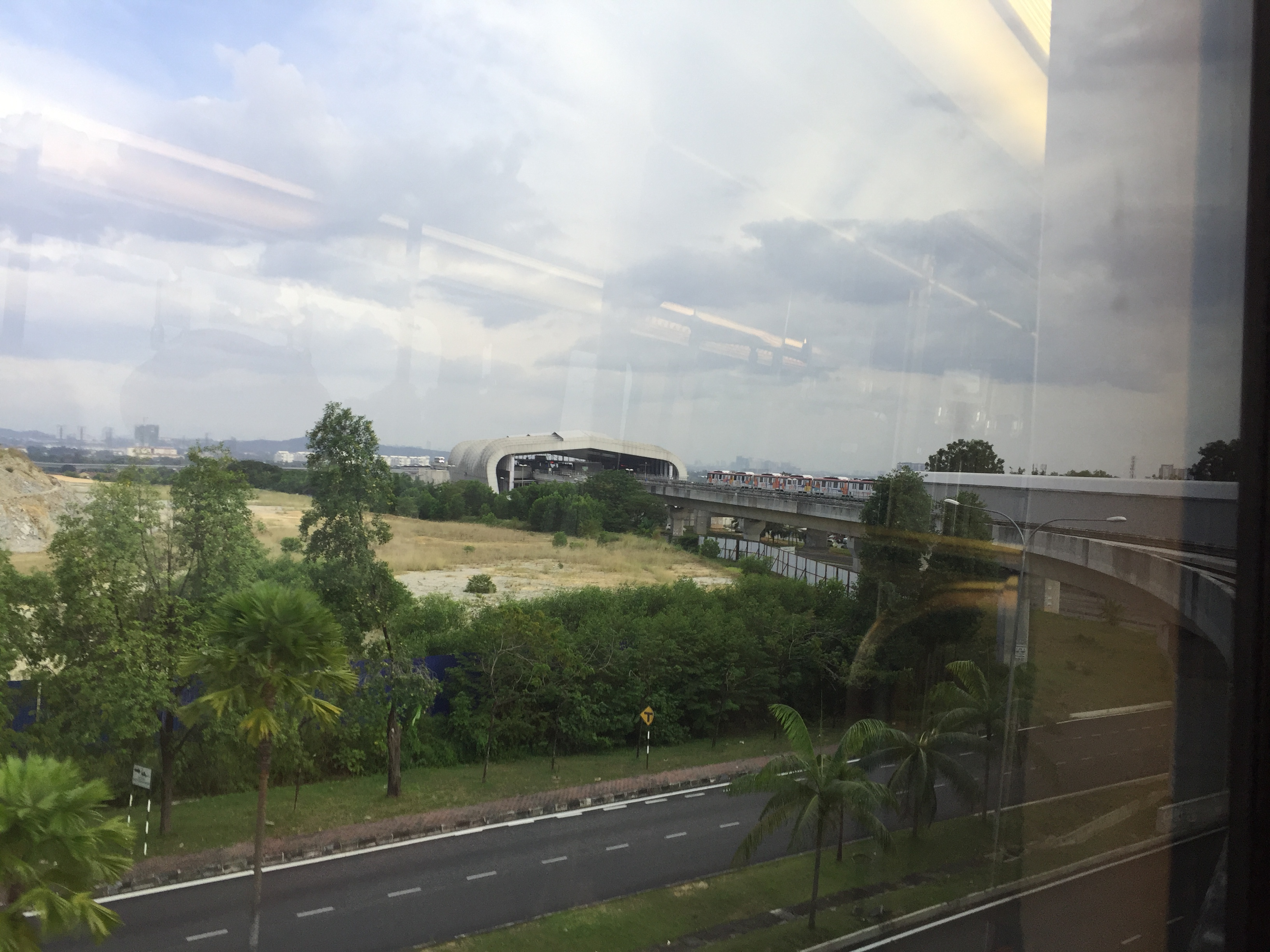
Further-out view of the station from an approaching train on the Kelana Jaya Line

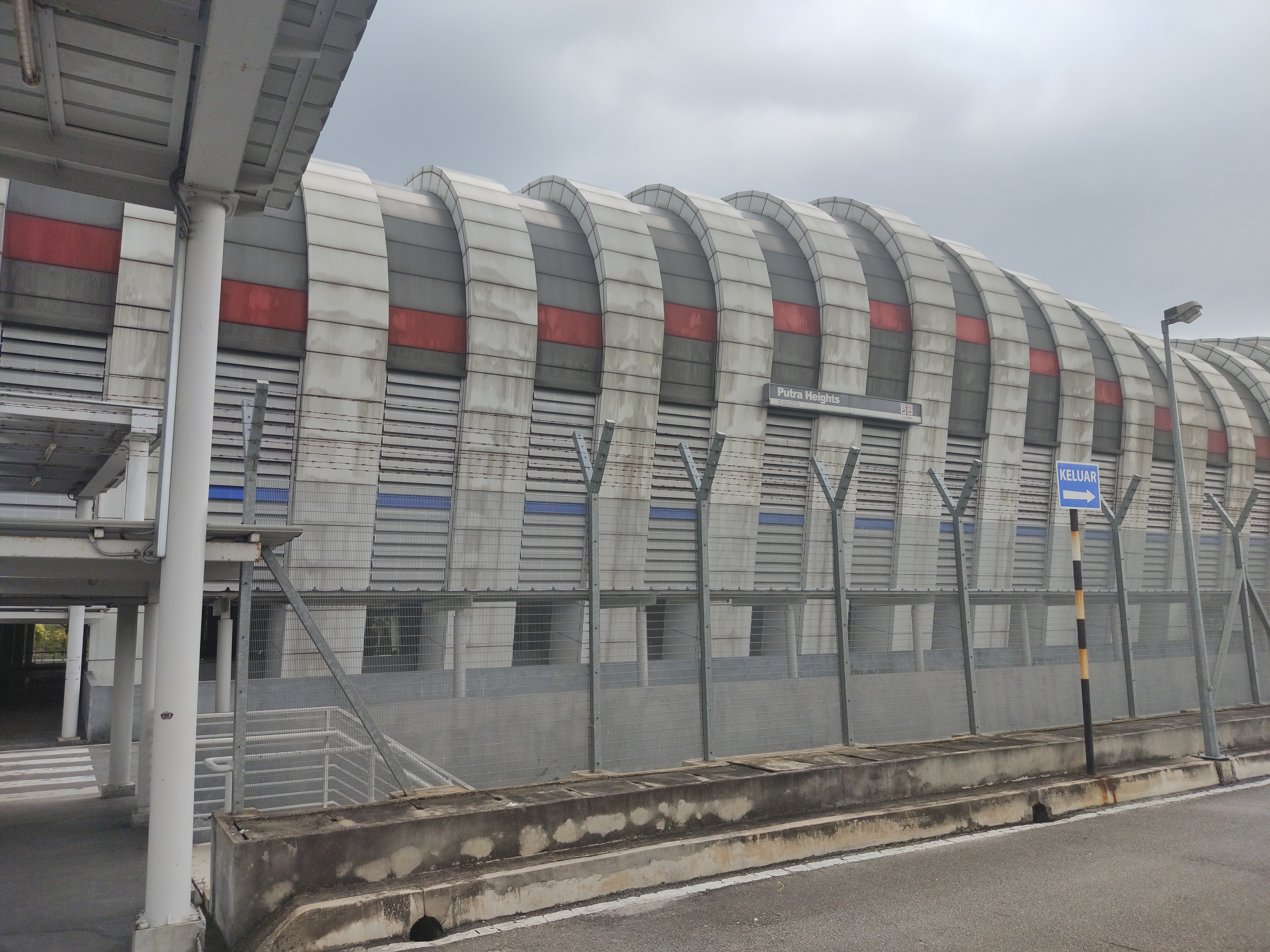
Side view of the station from the Park N' Ride area

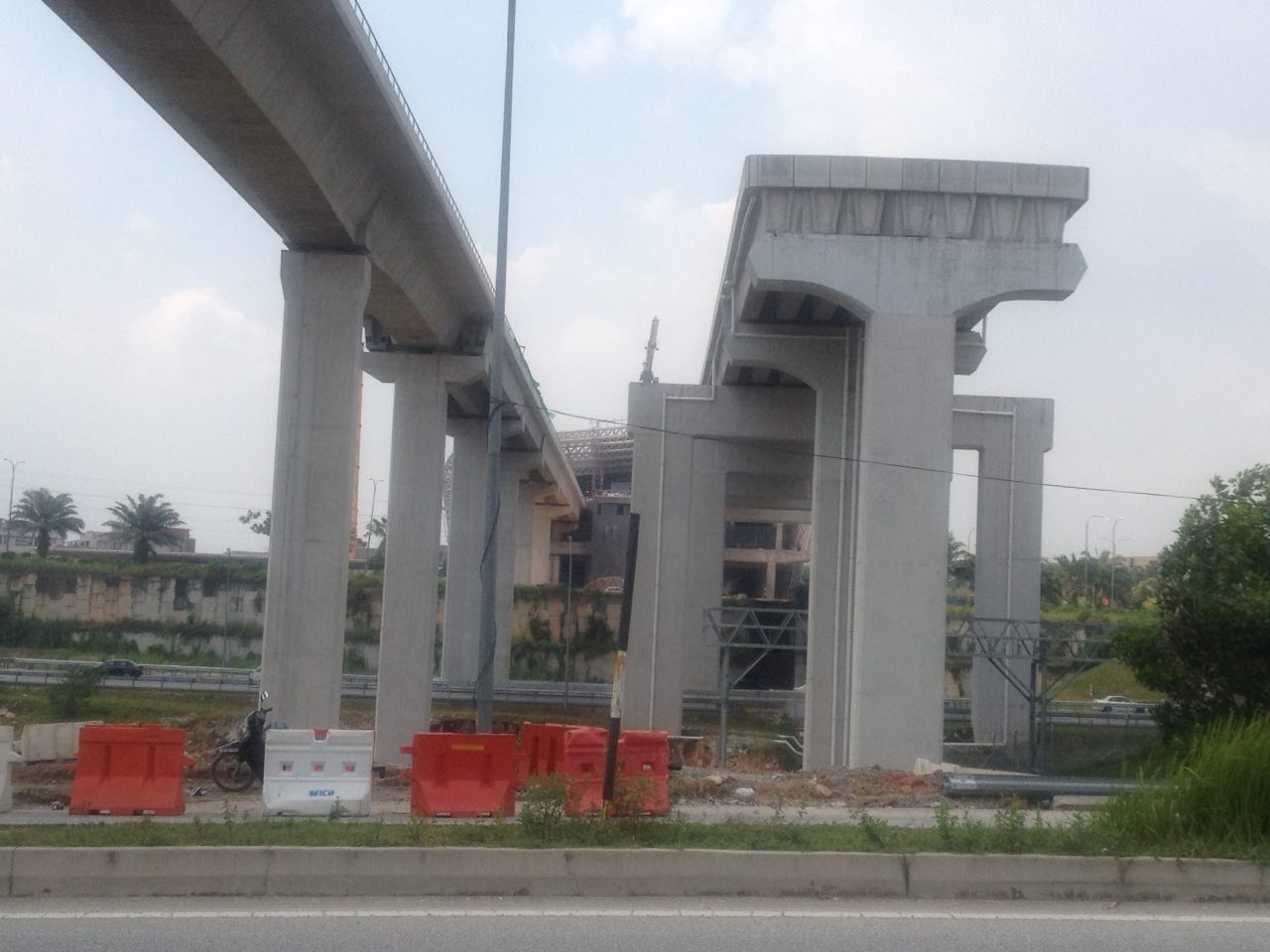
Putra Heights LRT station and Kelana Jaya Line stabling

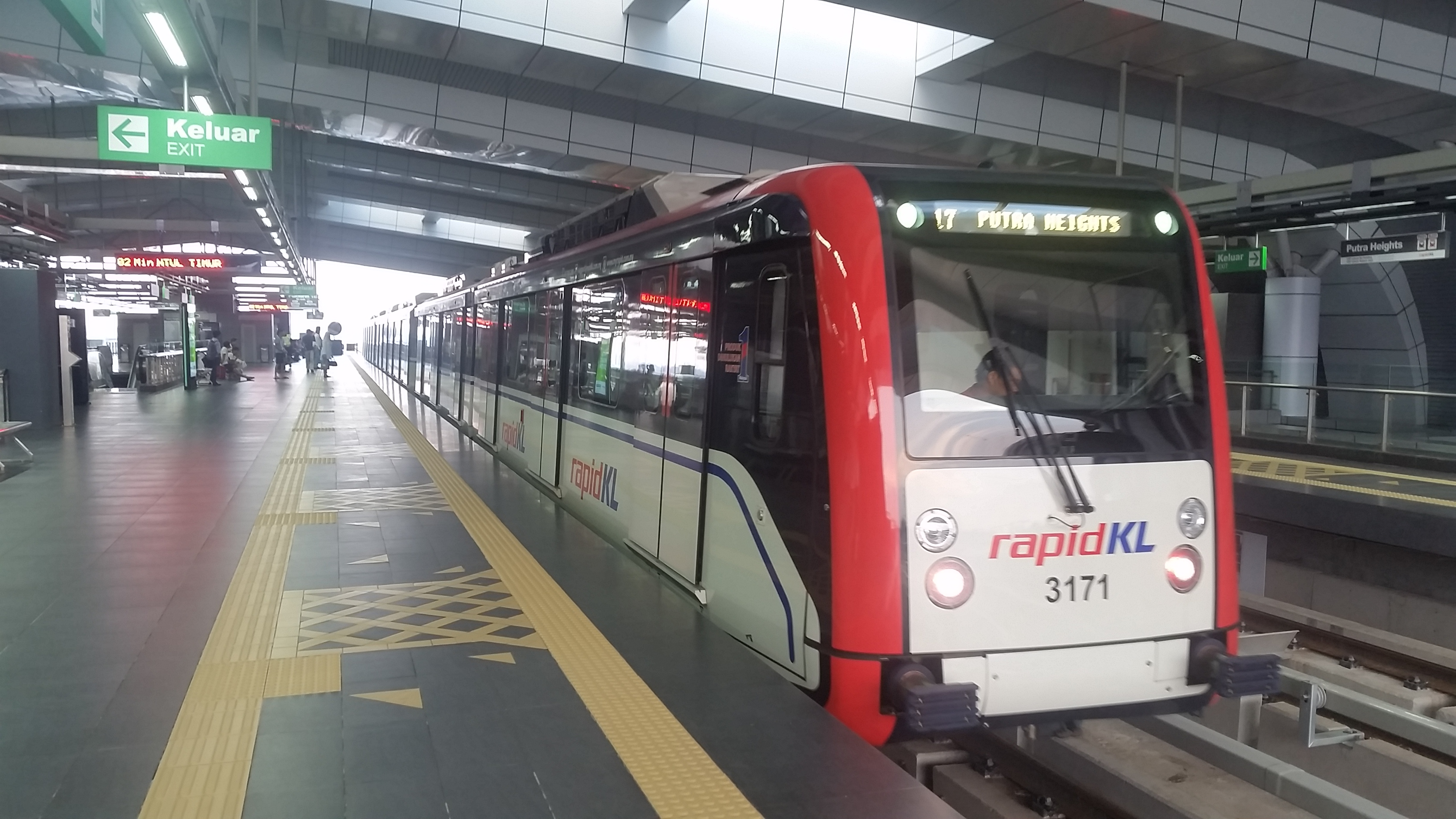
A Sri Petaling Line train at the station

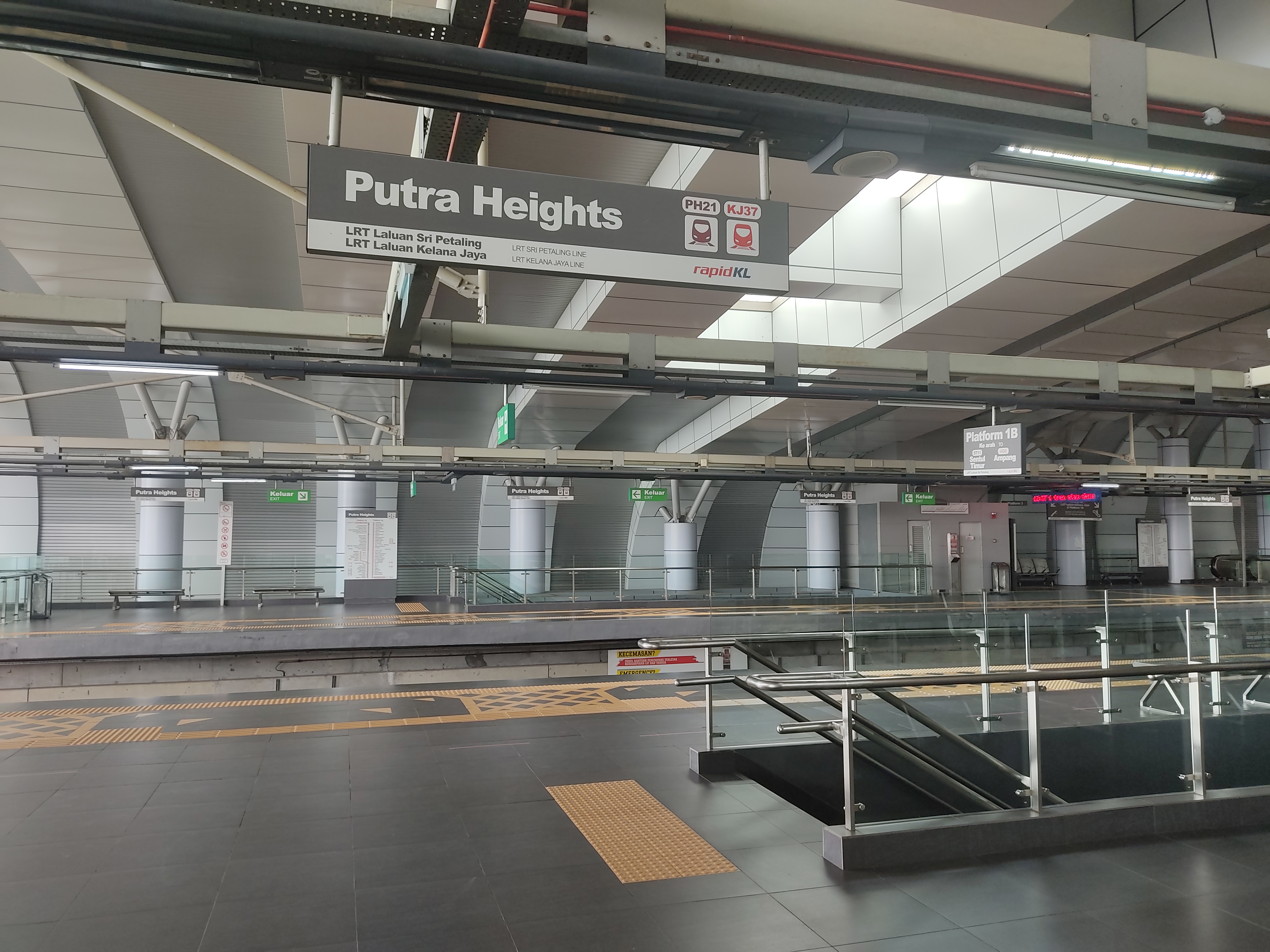
Signboards at this station are shown in grey to show that the station belongs to two lines, similar to the USJ 7 station on the Kelana Jaya Line as well as Bandar Utama and Glenmarie 2 stations on the Shah Alam Line

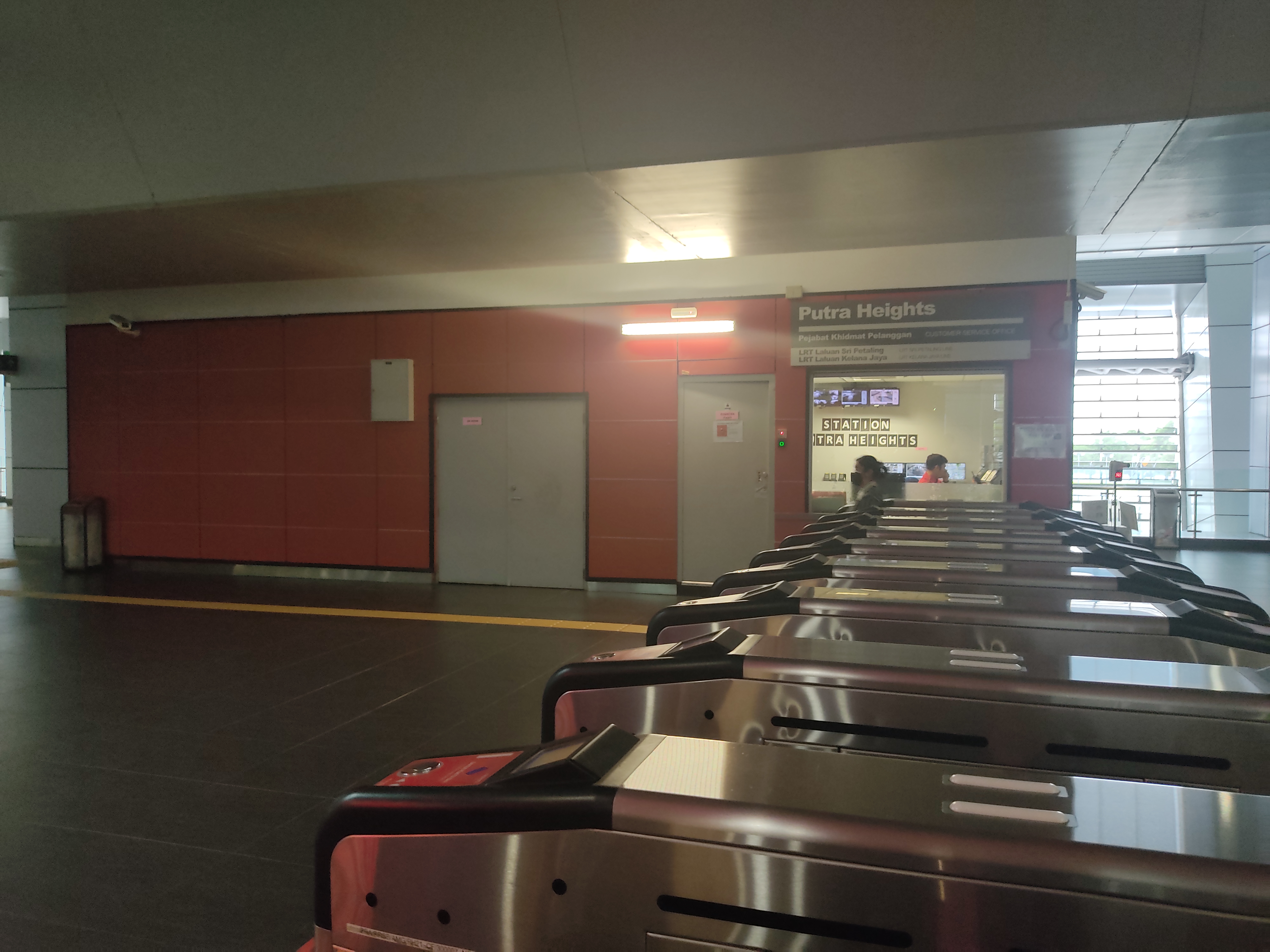
View of the station's fare gates and customer service counter at the concourse level

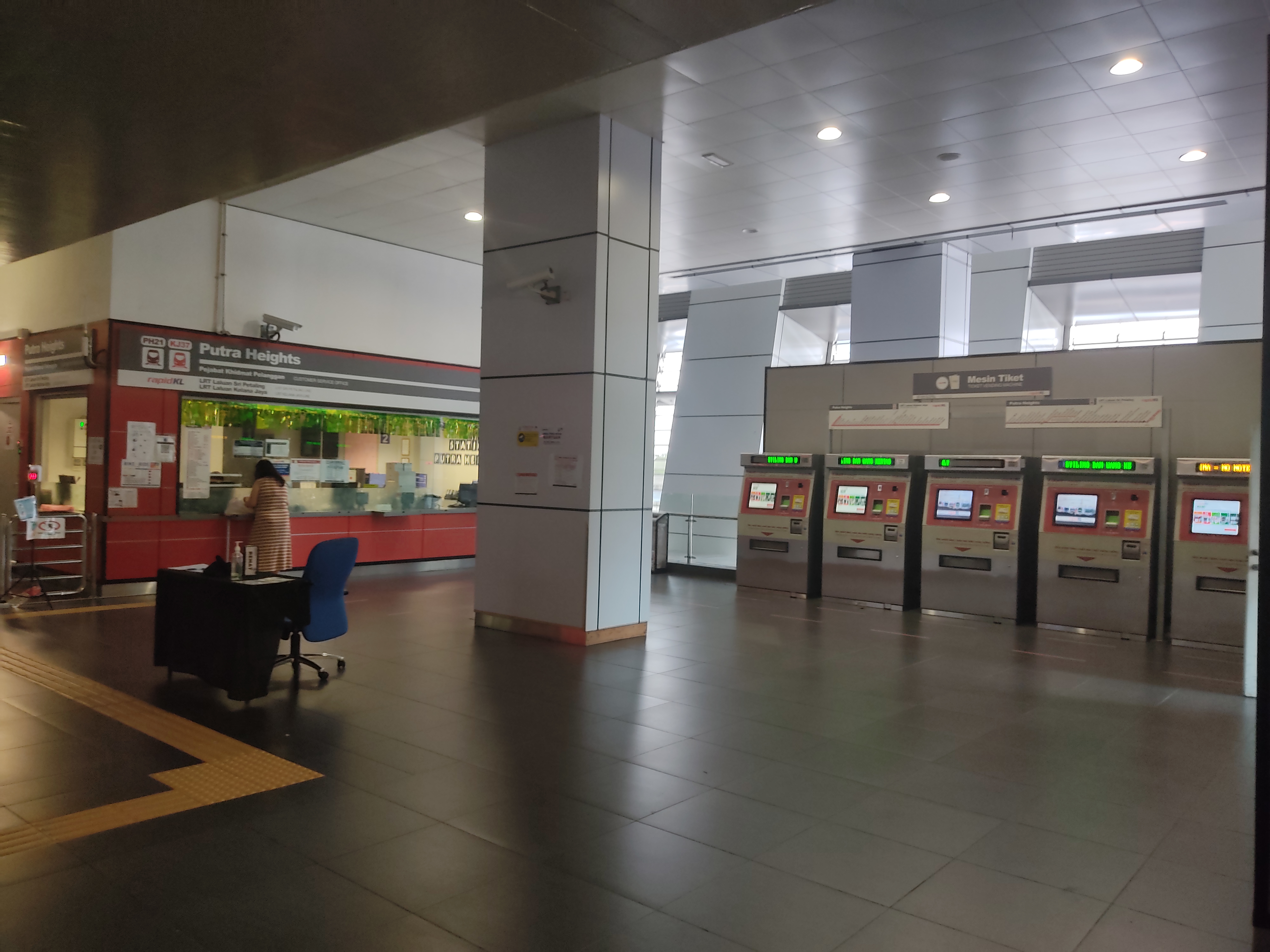
View of the station's ticketing machines and customer service counter at the concourse level

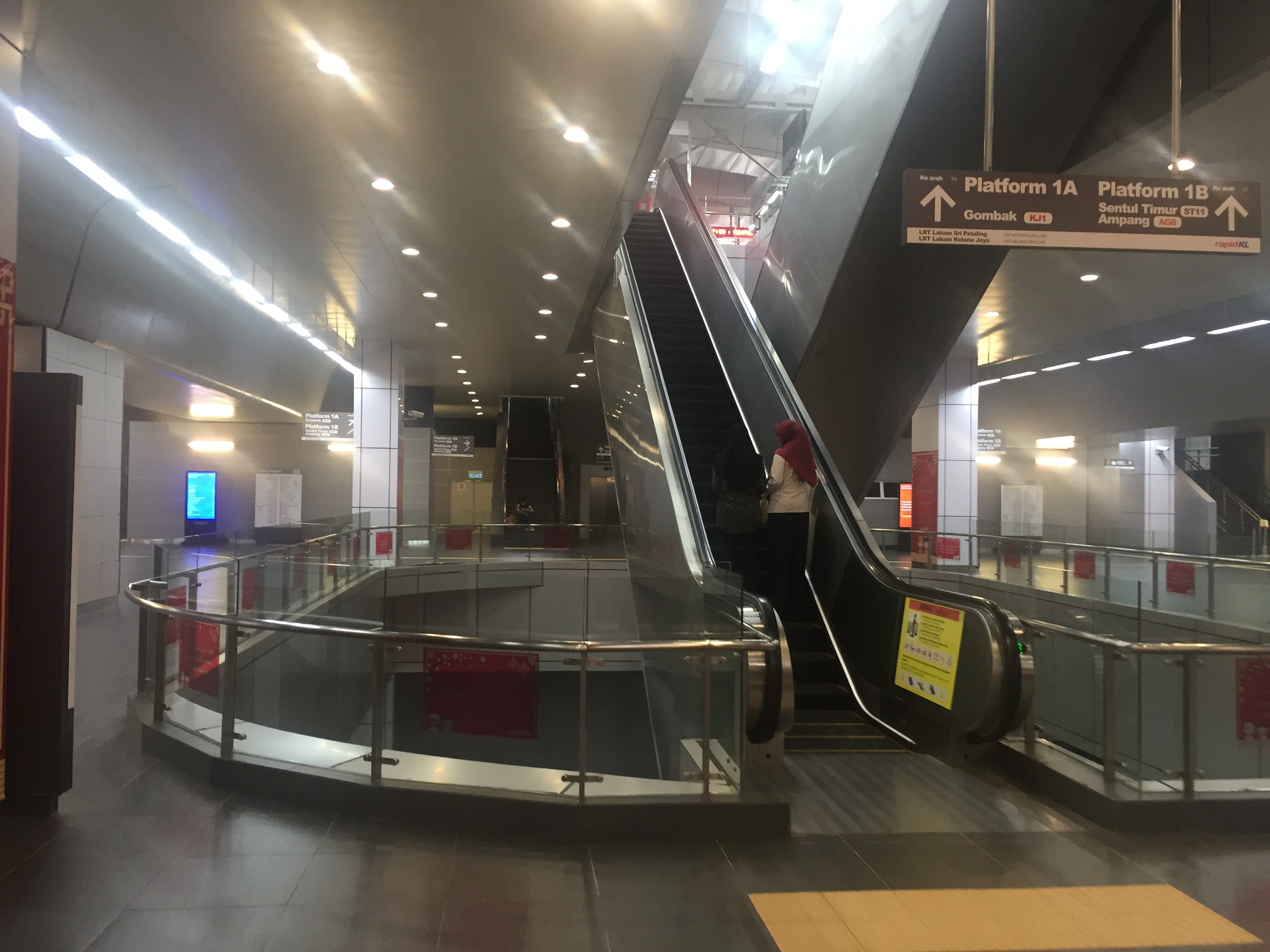
View of the station's lifts leading to the platform level

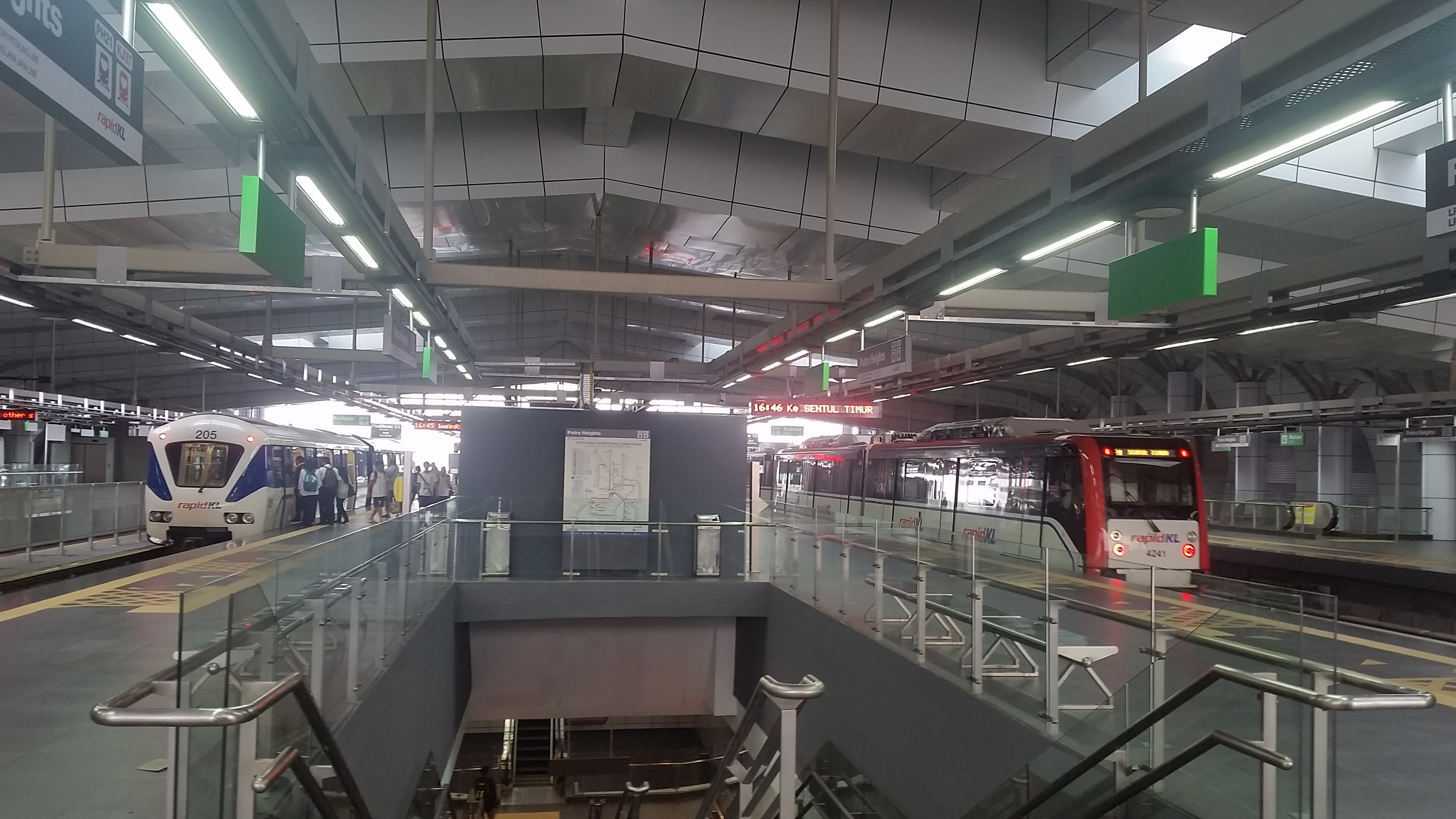
The station's island platform; commuters are able to switch across between the Kelana Jaya Line (left) and Sri Petaling Line (right)

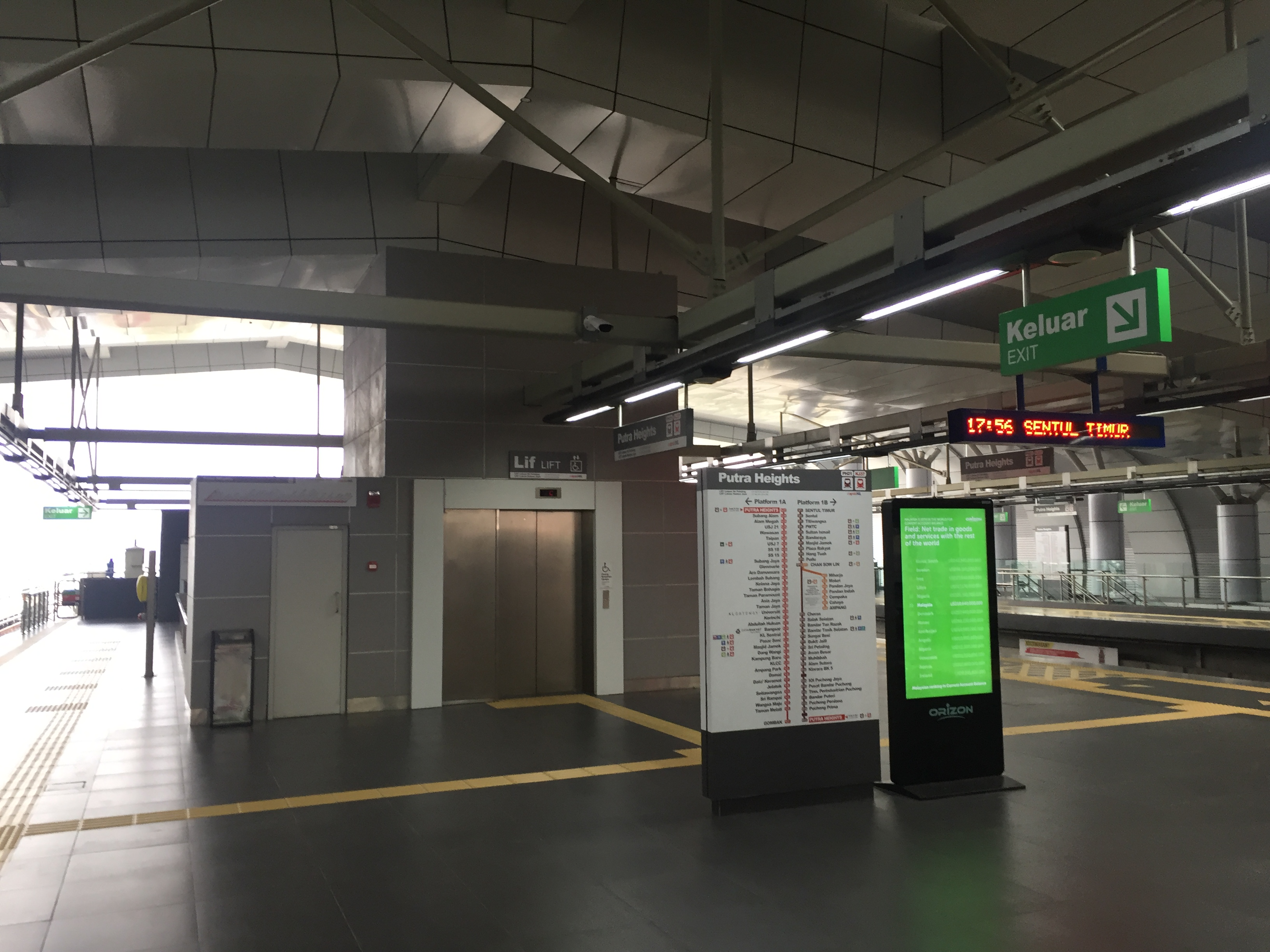
View of the station's lift and information board at the platform level

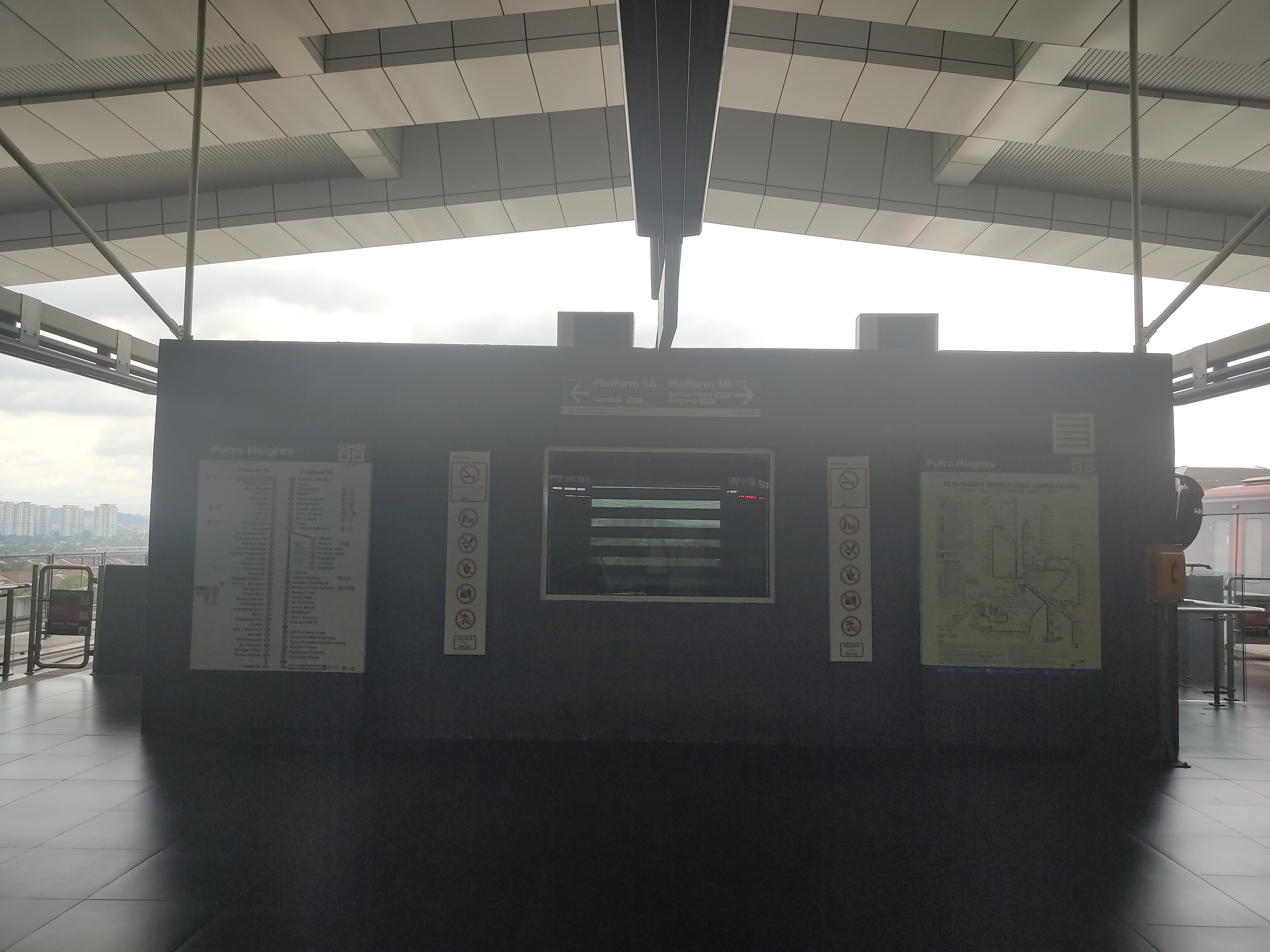
View of the station's control center at the platform level

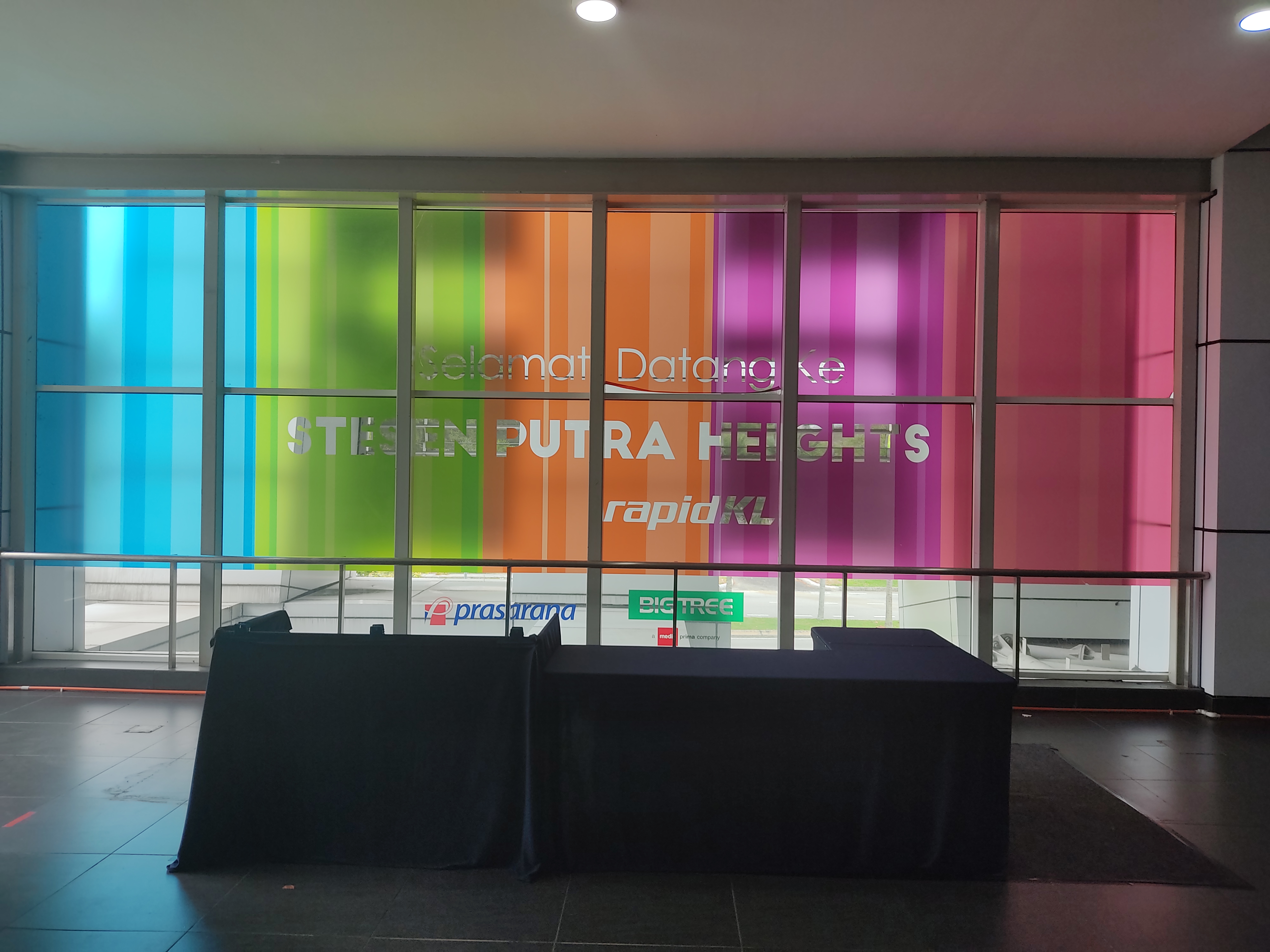
View of the station's decorative wallpaper

The island platform at night in September 2026

A train alongside the platform at night in September 2026

== See also ==
- Stations with similar cross-platform interchange concept:
  - Chan Sow Lin station (LRT portion)
  - Kwasa Damansara MRT station
  - Tun Razak Exchange MRT station (underground)
