= Inland Revenue Board of Malaysia =

Malaysian government agency

- Lembaga Hasil Dalam Negeri Malaysia لمباݢ حاصل دالم نݢري مليسيا
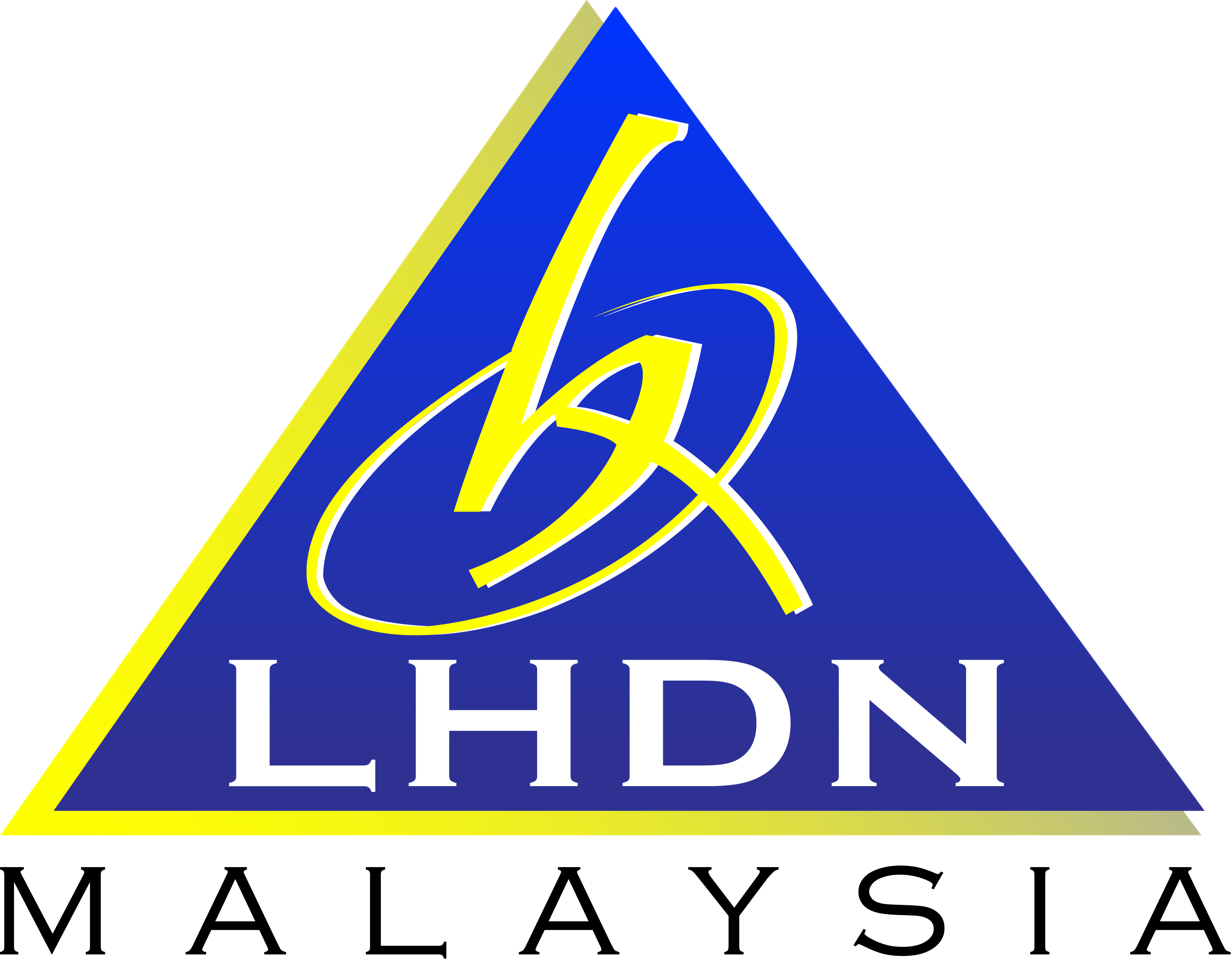

Agency overview
- Formed: 1948; 78 years ago
- Preceding agency: Inland Revenue Department of Malaysia (1957–1996)
- Jurisdiction: Government of Malaysia
- Headquarters: Tingkat 14, Menara HASiL, Persiaran Rimba Permai, Cyber 8, 63000 Cyberjaya, Selangor
- Minister responsible: Anwar Ibrahim, Minister of Finance
- Agency executive: Abu Tariq Jamaluddin, Chief Executive Officer
- Parent agency: Ministry of Finance
- Website: www.hasil.gov.my

The Inland Revenue Board of Malaysia (IRB; Malay: Lembaga Hasil Dalam Negeri Malaysia; Jawi: لمباݢ حاصل دالم نݢري مليسيا; officially abbreviated as LHDN, also known as HASiL) is a Malaysian government agency and statutory body under the Ministry of Finance. Established in 1948 as the Inland Revenue Department, it is one of the main revenue collection agencies under the Ministry that entrusted to oversaws tax collection especially in the areas of finance and personnel management to improve the quality of tax administration.

== History ==
The IRB was established in 1948 as the Income Tax Office. In 1957, after Malaysia gained independence, the Income Tax Office was upgraded into a department and renamed as the Inland Revenue Department. In 1995, the Inland Revenue Board Act 1995 was gazetted and came into effect and on 1 March 1996, the Inland Revenue Department upgraded into a statutory body and took its present name. It also set up a special hotline called Teleinfo to allow the public to check-up their tax payment status via telephone in 1997.

== See also ==
- Taxation in Malaysia
- List of states and federal territories of Malaysia by household income
