= Credit Reporting Agencies Act 2010 =

Credit reporting law in Malaysia

Parliament of Malaysia
- Long title: An Act to provide for the registration and regulation of persons carrying on credit reporting businesses and for matters connected therewith and incidental thereto.
- Citation: Act 710
- Territorial extent: Malaysia
- Passed by: Dewan Rakyat
- Passed: 20 April 2010
- Passed by: Dewan Negara
- Passed: 4 May 2010
- Royal assent: 2 June 2010
- Commenced: 10 June 2010
- Effective: 15 January 2014, P.U. (B) 12/2014

Legislative history

Initiating chamber: Dewan Rakyat
- Bill title: Credit Reporting Agencies Bill 2009
- Bill citation: D.R. 36/2009
- Introduced by: Dato' Seri Dr. Awang Adek Hussin, Deputy Minister of Finance (Malaysia)
- First reading: 18 November 2009
- Second reading: 20 April 2010
- Third reading: 20 April 2010

Revising chamber: Dewan Negara
- Bill title: Credit Reporting Agencies Bill 2009
- Bill citation: D.R. 36/2009
- Member(s) in charge: Dato' Seri Dr. Awang Adek Hussin, Deputy Minister of Finance (Malaysia)
- Second reading: 4 May 2010
- Third reading: 4 May 2010

Related legislation
- Personal Data Protection Act 2010 [Act 709]

Keywords
- Registrar Office of Credit Reporting Agencies, credit bureau, credit reporting
- Status: In force

The Credit Reporting Agencies Act 2010 (Malay: Akta Agensi Pelaporan Kredit 2010) is a Malaysian law which provides for the registration and regulation of credit reporting agencies and for related, consequential and incidental matters.

The Bill was introduced into the Parliament of Malaysia by Dato' Seri Dr. Awang Adek Hussin, Deputy Minister of Finance (Malaysia) on 18 November 2009. It was passed by the Dewan Rakyat (House of Representatives) on 20 April 2010 and the Dewan Negara (Senate) on 4 May 2010 without any amendment. The Act received Royal Assent on 2 June 2010 pursuant to Clause 4A of Article 66 of the Federal Constitution.

The Registrar Office of Credit Reporting Agencies of the Ministry of Finance (Malaysia) is responsible for the administration and enforcement of this Act.

== Structure ==
The Credit Reporting Agencies Act 2010 consists of 9 Parts containing 77 sections and 4 schedules.

- Part I: Preliminary
- Part II: Appointment, Functions and Powers of Registrar
- Part III: Registration of Credit Reporting Agencies
- Part IV: Management of Credit Reporting Agencies
- Part V: Conduct of Business of Credit Reporting Agencies
- Part VI: Inspection, Complaint and Investigation
- Part VII: Enforcement
- Part VIII: Miscellaneous
- Part IX: Saving and Transitional Provisions
- First Schedule
- Second Schedule
- Third Schedule
- Fourth Schedule

== Subsidiary legislation ==
Under sections 20, 72 and 74 of the Act, the Minister has made the following subsidiary legislation:

- Credit Reporting Agencies (Registration) Regulations 2014 [P.U. (A) 142/2014]
- Credit Reporting Agencies (Compounding of Offences) Regulations 2014 [P.U. (A) 275/2014]
- Credit Reporting Agencies (Registration) (Amendment) Regulations 2021 [P.U. (A) 408/2021]
- Credit Reporting Agencies (Minimum Amount of Paid-Up Capital) Order 2026 [P.U. (A) 102/2026]
- Credit Reporting Agencies (Registration) (Amendment) Regulations 2026 [P.U. (A) 103/2026]

== Notes ==
- The Personal Data Protection Act 2010 [Act 709] does not apply to the processing of credit information by a credit reporting agency under section 76 of the Act.
- The provisions of the Act do not apply to the Central Credit Reference Information System (CCRIS) established under section 47 of the Central Bank of Malaysia Act 2009 [Act 701] and administered by Bank Negara Malaysia.
