= Ministry of Finance Complex, Putrajaya =

Government building in Putrajaya, Malaysia

Coordinates: 2°55′34.3″N 101°41′19.6″E

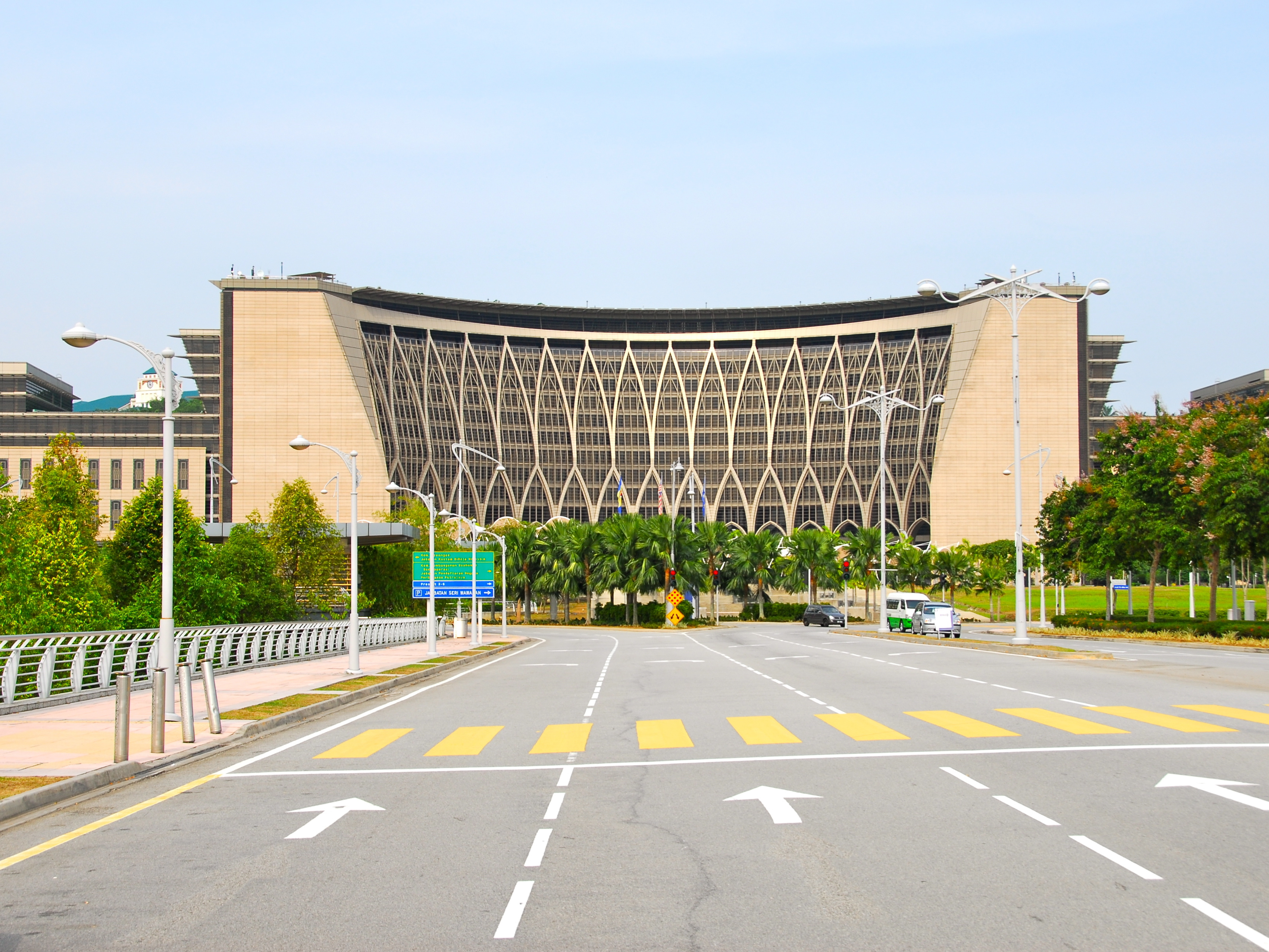
Ministry of Finance Complex

The Ministry of Finance Complex is a building complex housing the Malaysian Ministry of Finance, opposite the Boulevard and Dataran Wawasan in Precinct 2 (north of the Core Island) of Putrajaya.

The Ministry of Finance (MoF) comprises the Royal Customs and Excise Department, the Department of Valuation and Property Services, the Department of the National Accountant of Malaysia, the Inland Revenue Board, the Securities Commission, and the National Bank of Malaysia.

== See also ==
- Ministry of Finance (Malaysia)
