= Subang Alam LRT station =

Light rapid transit station in Shah Alam, Selangor, Malaysia

KJ36 Subang Alam
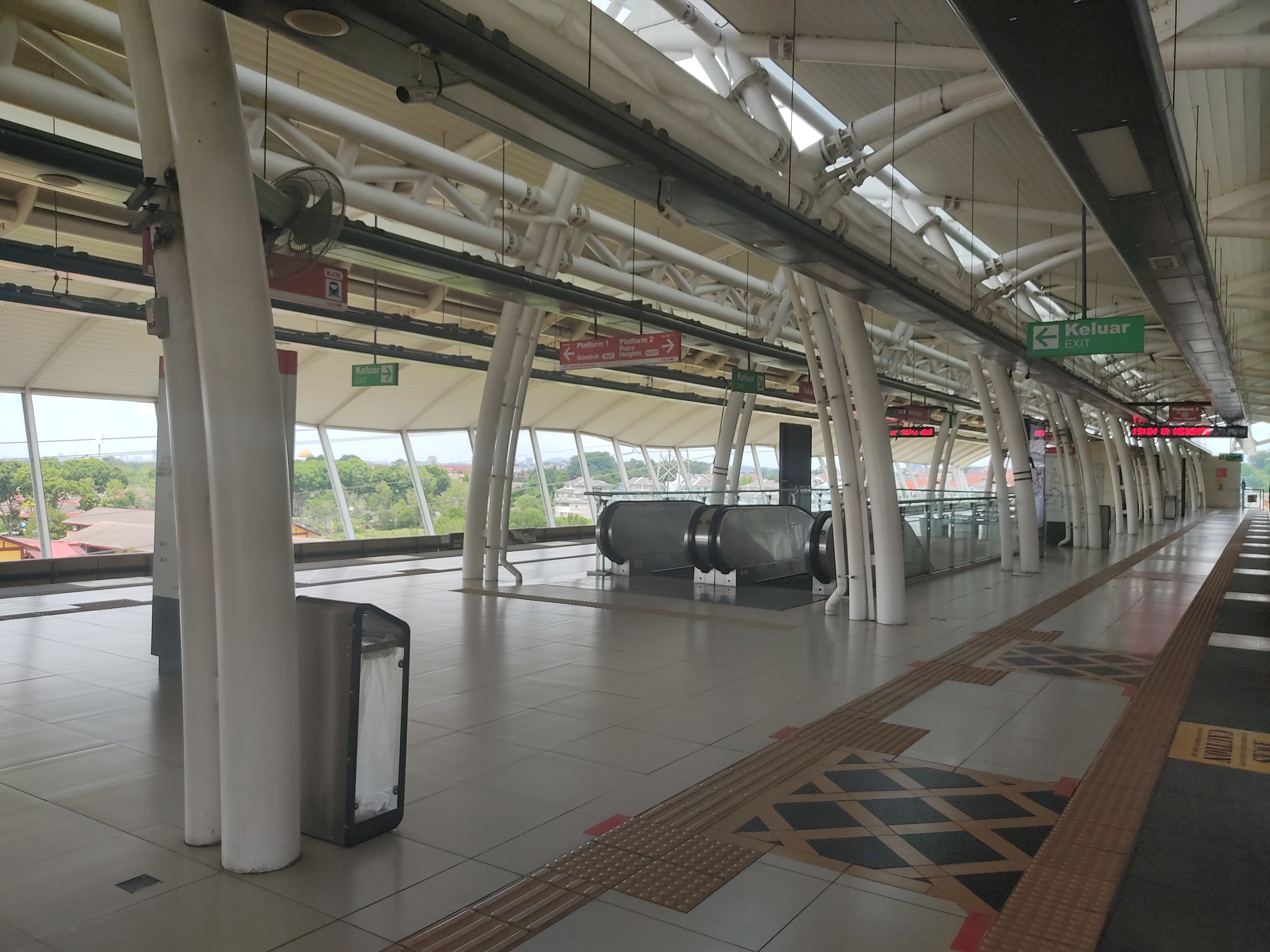
- View of the station platform

General information
- Other names: Malay: سوبڠ عالم (Jawi); Chinese: 梳邦阿南; Tamil: சுபாங் ஆலாம்
- Location: Persiaran Putra Perdana, Subang Alam, Section 28, 40400 Shah Alam; Selangor; Malaysia
- Coordinates: 3°00′35″N 101°34′20″E
- System: Rapid KL
- Owner: Prasarana Malaysia
- Operator: Rapid Rail
- Line: 5 Kelana Jaya Line
- Platforms: 1 island platform
- Tracks: 2

Construction
- Structure type: Elevated
- Parking: Available with payment, 115 total parking bays

Other information
- Station code: KJ36

History
- Opened: 30 June 2016; 10 years ago

Services
Preceding station		Following station
Alam Megah towards Gombak	Kelana Jaya Line	Putra Heights Terminus
Location

Subang Alam LRT station is a light rapid transit (LRT) station at Subang Alam in Shah Alam, Selangor, Malaysia. It is located near Sekolah Kebangsaan Alam Megah 2. The station serves the nearby Subang Alam and Aroma Tropika neighbourhoods in Shah Alam.

It is served by the LRT Kelana Jaya Line. Like most other LRT stations operating in the Klang Valley, this station is elevated.

== Bus services ==
Currently there are no bus services available. The feeder bus route T758 was discontinued on 1 November 2020.

Route No.	Origin	Destination	Via
T758	KJ36 Subang Alam	Section 28, Shah Alam (Taman Alam Megah)	Putra Heights Police Station; SMK Putra Heights; PUSPAKOM Shah Alam; Hero Market Alam Megah
