= Tax incentives in Malaysia =

Malaysia has enacted a number of tax incentives to encourage particular forms of economic activity. Many tax incentives simply remove part or of the burden of the tax from business transactions. In Malaysia, the corporate tax rate is now capped at 25%. Nevertheless, a company eligible for a certain tax incentive might only pay an average effective tax rate of 7.5%, with only 30% of the company's profit being subjected to tax. This is a good example of how the companies benefit through the incentives provided by the Malaysian Government.

There are a number of tax incentives given to entrepreneurs to encourage business growth and development. Therefore, many businesses have taken advantage of the various tax incentives available for their benefit. Good knowledge of these tax incentives has provided them ideas to effectively plan their business and investment strategies. As such companies have to seek expert opinions on all available tax incentives before they make their move to invest, because the incentives vary according to the business' structure. As an example, certain incentives are only available to private limited companies (Sdn. Bhd.) or public listed companies in Malaysia.

== Specific incentives ==
=== Pioneer Status (PS) ===
This is a tax usually a partial exemption on tax payment for a period of five years. As a pioneer status incentive the tax holder is exempted up to 70 percent tax of its statutory income therefore only 30 percent is being paid. The incentive is available to companies engaging in business activities or in the production of promoted products and the Malaysian Investment Development Authority (MIDA) determines the promoted product or activity.

=== Investment Tax Allowance (ITA) ===
This is another investment eligible to production of promoted products. This tax is specifically suitable for companies with large capital investment but cannot generate returns over a short time. It is provided for plant and equipment acquired by the company during the tax relief period, usually from 5 to 10 years. The normal rate of allowance is 60 per cent on the qualifying capital expenditure. ITA can be offset against 70 per cent of companies' statutory incomes.

=== Reinvestment Allowance (RA) ===
According to the Income Tax Act 1967 Schedule 7A- Reinvestment Allowance Subject to this Schedule, where a company which is resident in Malaysia has been in operation for not less than twelve months; and has incurred in the basis period for a year of assessment capital expenditure on a factory, plant or machinery used in Malaysia for the purposes of a qualifying project there shall be given to the company for that year of assessment a reinvestment allowance of an amount equal to sixty per cent of that expenditure:Provided that such expenditure shall not include capital expenditure incurred on plant or machinery which is provided wholly or partly for the use of a director, or an individual who is a member of the management, or administrative or clerical staff.

== Modes ==
In Malaysia there are a variety of tax incentives to encourage investments whether by foreign direct investors or domestic investors. There are four modes of incentives to be discussed vividly.

Mode of incentive	Incentive measure
Full or partial exemption of statutory income	Regional distribution centre Operational headquarters International procurement centre Allowance for increased exports Malaysian international trading company Contract R&D company etc.
Additional relief for qualifying capital expenditure	Investment tax allowance Reinvestment allowance Contract R&D company R&D company etc.
Double deduction	Approved research Promotion of exports Promotion of export of qualifying services Payments to Contract R&D company for services Premium for export insurance with Malaysian insurer Promotion of Malaysian brand name etc.
Preferential tax rate	Inward reinsurance business Offshore insurance business Fund management services to foreign investors etc.

== New Incentive Framework (NIF) ==
In 2026 Malaysia introduced the New Incentive Framework (NIF), announced under the National Budget 2026 and administered by the Malaysian Investment Development Authority (MIDA).
