= Alam Megah LRT station =

Light rapid transit station in Shah Alam, Selangor, Malaysia

KJ35 Alam Megah
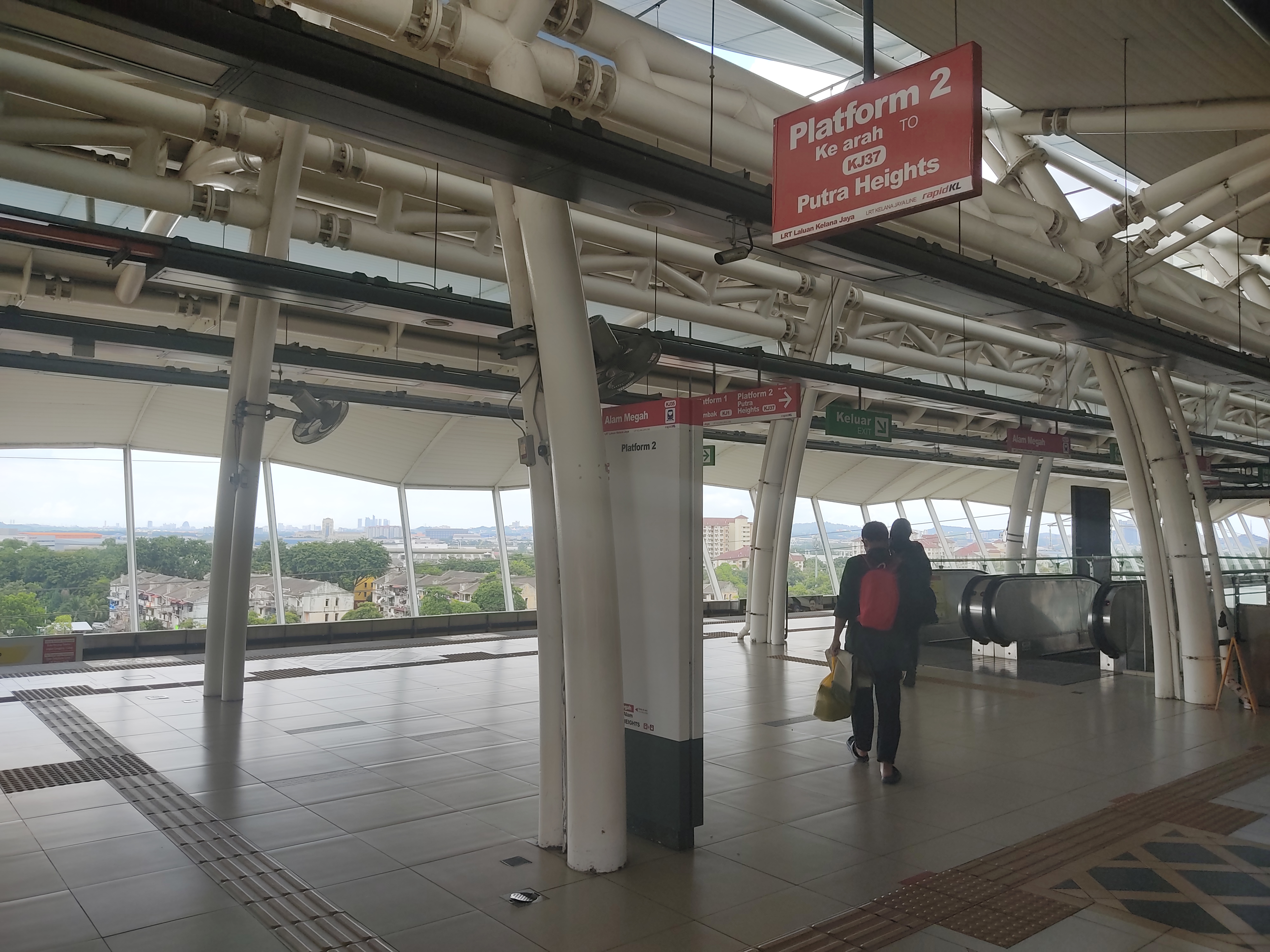
- View of the station platform

General information
- Other names: Malay: عالم مݢه (Jawi); Chinese: 美佳园; Tamil: ஆலாம் மேகா
- Location: Jalan Beranang 27/14A, Taman Bunga Negara, Alam Megah, Section 27, 40400 Shah Alam; Selangor; Malaysia
- Coordinates: 3°01′24.1″N 101°34′19.6″E
- System: Rapid KL
- Owner: Prasarana Malaysia
- Operator: Rapid Rail
- Line: 5 Kelana Jaya Line
- Platforms: 1 island platform
- Tracks: 2

Construction
- Structure type: Elevated
- Parking: Available with payment, 196 total parking bays

Other information
- Station code: KJ35

History
- Opened: 30 June 2016; 10 years ago

Services
Preceding station		Following station
USJ 21 towards Gombak	Kelana Jaya Line	Subang Alam towards Putra Heights
Location

Alam Megah LRT station is a light rapid transit (LRT) station at Alam Megah in Shah Alam, Selangor, Malaysia.

It is served by the LRT Kelana Jaya Line. Like most other LRT stations operating in the Klang Valley, this station is elevated.

== Bus services ==
Kumpool Vanpool ride-sharing service to the station are available here.

=== Feeder buses ===
Route No.	Origin	Destination	Via	Notes
T757	KJ35 Alam Megah	Section 27, Shah Alam (Taman Alam Megah)	Dewan MBSA; Nexus Business Suite; Pasar Borong SSW; Taman Bunga Negara; Kota Harmoni Residence; Masjid Baitul Mahabbah	Full DRT route, booking via Kumpool ride-sharing app required
SA08	KJ35 Alam Megah	Taman Perindustrian Kota Kemuning		Smart Selangor Bus

=== Other buses ===
Route No.	Origin	Destination	Via	Notes
752	KJ37 SP31 Putra Heights	Hentian Bandar Shah Alam (Section 14)	Giant Putra Heights; Pangsapuri Sri Muitara; Taman Alam Megah (Section 27 & 28); KJ35 Alam Megah; HICOM (Section 26); KPJ Section 20; Persiaran Kayangan; Persiaran Dato Menteri	Bus do not stop here, passengers can walk to the SK Hicom bus stop to ride this bus

== Around the station ==
- SJK (C) Tun Tan Siew Sin (敦陈修信华小)
- SK HICOM
