= Malaysian federal budget =

Government financial announcement

In Malaysia, federal budgets are presented annually by the Government of Malaysia to identify proposed government revenues and spending and forecast economic conditions for the upcoming year, and its fiscal policy for the forward years. The federal budget includes the government's estimates of revenue and spending and may outline new policy initiatives. Federal budgets are usually released in October, before the start of the fiscal year. All of the Malaysian states also present budgets. Since state finances are dependent on money from the federal government, these budgets are usually released after the federal one.

The federal budget is a major state financial plan for the fiscal year, which has the force of law after its approval by the Malaysian parliament and signed into law by the Yang di-Pertuan Agong.

Revenue estimates detailed in the budget are raised through the Malaysian taxation system, with government spending representing a sizeable proportion of the overall economy. Besides presenting the government's expected revenues and expenditures, the federal budget is also a political statement of the government's intentions and priorities, and has profound macroeconomic implications.

== Budget process ==
The budget is announced in the Dewan Rakyat (House of Representatives) by the Minister of Finance, who traditionally wears Baju Melayu while doing so. The Budget is then voted on by the House. Budgets are a confidence measure, and if the House votes against it, the government can fall, although it has never happened. The governing party strictly enforces party discipline, usually expelling from the party caucus any government Member of Parliament (MP) who votes against the budget. Opposition parties almost always vote against the budget. Since 2008, the opposition bloc used to prepare a complete alternative budget and present this alternative to the Malaysian people along with the main budget. In cases of minority government, the government has normally had to include major concessions to one of the smaller parties to ensure passage of the budget.

Malaysia follows the conventions of the Westminster system. For example, the prime minister must have the support of a majority in the Dewan Rakyat (House of Representatives), and must in any case be able to ensure the existence of no absolute majority against the government. In relation to the budget, that requires that if the House fails to pass the government's budget, even by one ringgit, then the government must either resign so that a different government can be appointed or seek a parliamentary dissolution so that new general elections may be held to re-confirm or deny the government's mandate.

The process of creating the budget is a complex one which begins within the working ranks for the Federal Government. Each year, the various departments and agencies that make up the Government submit what are called 'The Main Estimates' to The Treasury Board Secretariat. These documents identify the planned expenditure of each department and agency, linking these proposed expenses to programs, to objectives and ultimately to the priorities of the current ruling Government. The Treasury Board Secretariat combines these budget estimates and compile an initial proposed budget. From there, the Cabinet and Prime Minister's Department adjust the budget based on a series of economic, social and political factors. In reality, decisions are usually made with the primary intend of re-election and so often include advantages for key regions and lobby groups.

The government reserves the right to submit "supplementary supply bills", which add additional funding above and beyond what was originally appropriated at the beginning of the fiscal year. Supplementary supply bills can be used for things like disaster relief and to update its agencies' spending totals for the current financial year and report any governmental re-organisations.

== Classification of revenue ==
The Federal Government’s revenue is classified into four general categories, namely tax revenue, non-tax revenue, non-revenue receipts and revenue from the Federal Territories.

=== Tax revenue ===
Tax revenue is classified into direct tax revenue and indirect tax revenue.

Direct tax revenue includes revenue from:

- income tax and supplementary income tax (individual, company, petroleum, withholding and cooperatives);
- estate duty;
- stamp duty;
- real property gains tax (RPGT);
- Labuan offshore business activity tax; and
- miscellaneous direct taxes.

Indirect tax revenue includes revenue from:

- Goods and Services Tax (GST);
- export duties;
- import duties;
- excise duties;
- levies; and
- miscellaneous indirect taxes.

=== Non-tax revenue ===
Non-tax revenue consists of:

- licences, registration fees and permits: inclusive of all charges imposed on the granting of rights to individuals, corporations, businesses including petroleum royalty, and other enterprises as well as motor vehicle licences for purpose of regulation or control and levy on foreign workers;
- service fees: inclusive of receipts from services rendered by the Federal Government to the public;
- proceeds from sales of goods: inclusive of receipts from the sales of physical assets owned by the Government including lands, buildings, office equipments, storage facilities and the sale of miscellaneous goods to the public;
- rentals: inclusive of rentals from land, buildings, vehicles and machineries;
- interests and proceeds from investments: inclusive of proceeds from sale of investments, dividends earned from bonds or shares (PETRONAS dividend, Bank Negara dividend, Khazanah dividend), bank interests and interests on loans granted by the Government;
- fines and penalties: inclusive of out-of-court settlement fees as well as fines and forfeitures;
- contributions and compensations received from home and abroad;
- income from exploration of oil and gas: income from petroleum operation Malaysia-Thailand Joint Authority (MTJA); and
- other non-tax revenue.

=== Non-revenue receipts ===
Non-revenue receipts include:

- refunds of expenditures: inclusive of payments in previous years and refunds of salaries arising from resignations and training expenses, trust fund refunded and unclaimed funds; and
- inter-departmental credits: inclusive of transfer of funds between ministries or departments for services rendered between Government agencies, reimbursements of the Government’s contributions under the Employees Provident Fund Scheme and contributions from Government departments, statutory bodies or Government owned enterprises.

=== Revenue from the Federal Territories ===
Revenue from the Federal Territories consist of tax and non-tax revenue including receipts from licences and permits, premiums, quit rent, sale of assets, rentals, service fees and entertainment duties.

== Example Budget ==
=== Projected revenues ===
Revenue estimates for 2016 Budget, excluding 2016 tax measures
1. Companies income tax (33.0%)
2. Goods and services tax (17.3%)
3. Individual income tax (13.4%)
4. Interests and proceeds from investments (9.50%)
5. Licenses, registration fees and permits (6.00%)
6. Excise duties (5.50%)
7. Petroleum income tax (4.10%)
8. Stamp duty (3.00%)

Official sources

(In million MYR)

| Source | Revenues | % of Total Revenues |
|---|---|---|
| Direct tax Income tax Companies Individual Petroleum Withholding Co-operatives Others Other direct taxes Stamp duty Real property gains tax Others | 125,566 116,558 74,381 30,266 9,331 2,473 84 23 9,008 6,766 2,163 79 | 55.6% 51.6% 33.0% 13.4% 4.1% 1.1% 0.0% 0.0% 4.0% 3.0% 1.0% 0.0% |
| Indirect tax Goods and services tax Local goods and services Imported goods and services Excise duties CKD and CBU vehicles Others Import duties Others CKD and CBU vehicles Spirits and malt liquor Tobacco, cigarattes and cigar Other indirect taxes Export duties Crude petroleum Processed palm oil Crude palm oil Others | 57,987 39,000 21,729 17,271 12,408 7,259 5,149 2,791 2,234 424 94 39 2,776 1,012 900 52 43 17 | 25.7% 17.3% 9.6% 7.7% 5.5% 3.2% 2.3% 1.2% 1.0% 0.2% 0.0% 0.0% 1.2% 0.4% 0.4% 0.0% 0.0% 0.0% |
| Non-tax revenue Interests and proceeds from investments Licenses, registration fees and permits Other non-tax revenue Service fees Fines and penalties Proceeds from sales of goods Rentals | 39,648 21,452 12,626 2,506 1,510 1,223 211 120 | 17.6% 9.5% 6.0% 1.1% 0.7% 0.5% 0.1% 0.1% |
| Non-revenue receipts | 1,504 | 0.7% |
| Revenue from Federal Territories | 951 | 0.4% |
| Total Estimated Revenue | 225,656 | |

=== Projected expenditures by object ===
Official sources

These tables are in million MYR.

| Description | Expenditures |
Operating expenditures
| Emoluments | 70,466.1 |
| Supplies and services | 36,315.1 |
| Assets | 761.0 |
| Fixed Charges and Grants | 106,648.2 |
| Other Expenditures | 1,033.5 |
| Total Operating Expenditure | 215,224.0 |
Development expenditures
| Direct Grant | 47,178.1 |
| Loans | 2,821.9 |
| Contingencies Reserve | 2,000.0 |
| Total Development Expenditure | 52,000.0 |
| Total Estimated Expenditure | 267,224.0 |

=== Projected expenditures by budget function ===
Official sources

These tables are in million MYR. The budget for the 2016 fiscal year (also demonstrating the basic budget structure) can be found below.

| Function | Description | Expenditures | Operating Expenditures | Development Expenditures |
|---|---|---|---|---|
| 1 | Parliament | 131.1 | 131.1 | —N/a |
| 2 | Office of the Keeper of the Rulers' Seal | 2.1 | 2.1 | —N/a |
| 3 | National Audit Department | 163.8 | 163.8 | —N/a |
| 4 | Election Commission | 150.6 | 150.6 | —N/a |
| 5 | Public Services Commission | 47.4 | 47.4 | —N/a |
| 6 | Prime Minister's Department | 20,309.9 | 5,984.2 | 14,325.7 |
| 7 | Public Service Department | 2,515.4 | 2,436.6 | 78.9 |
| 8 | Attorney General Chambers | 185.4 | 185.4 | —N/a |
| 9 | Malaysian Anti-Corruption Commission | 251.8 | 251.8 | —N/a |
| 10 | Treasury | 4,477.2 | 3,626.0 | 851.3 |
| 11 | Treasury General Services | 25,885.9 | 25,885.9 | —N/a |
| 12 | Contribution to Statutory Funds | 1,883.8 | 1,883.8 | —N/a |
| 13 | Ministry of Foreign Affairs | 710.5 | 595.1 | 115.4 |
| 20 | Ministry of Plantation Industries and Commodities | 650.4 | 234.8 | 415.5 |
| 21 | Ministry of Agriculture and Agro-based Industry | 5,353.8 | 3,487.9 | 1,865.9 |
| 22 | Ministry of Rural and Regional Development | 10,831.2 | 5,379.9 | 5,451.3 |
| 23 | Ministry of Natural Resources and Environment | 2,670.9 | 1,008.1 | 1,662.8 |
| 24 | Ministry of International Trade and Industry | 1,914.4 | 539.3 | 1,375.2 |
| 25 | Ministry of Domestic Trade, Co-operatives and Consumerism | 797.4 | 730.1 | 67.3 |
| 27 | Ministry of Works | 5,775.9 | 2,223.3 | 3,552.6 |
| 28 | Ministry of Transport | 3,954.7 | 1,194.1 | 2,760.6 |
| 29 | Ministry of Energy, Green Technology and Water | 2,262.0 | 125.3 | 2,136.6 |
| 30 | Ministry of Science, Technology and Innovation | 1,527.0 | 661.1 | 865.8 |
| 31 | Ministry of Tourism and Culture | 1,221.0 | 973.2 | 247.8 |
| 32 | Ministry of the Federal Territories | 1,316.3 | 358.3 | 958.0 |
| 40 | Education Service Commission | 16.8 | 16.8 | —N/a |
| 42 | Ministry of Health | 23,031.1 | 21,430.8 | 1,600.3 |
| 43 | Ministry of Urban Wellbeing, Housing and Local Government | 4,173.1 | 2,477.1 | 1,696.0 |
| 45 | Ministry of Youth and Sports | 931.8 | 473.9 | 458.0 |
| 46 | Ministry of Human Resources | 1,376.8 | 836.1 | 540.7 |
| 47 | Ministry of Communications and Multimedia | 1,806.1 | 1,288.4 | 517.7 |
| 48 | Ministry of Women, Family and Community Development | 1,986.9 | 1,873.3 | 113.6 |
| 60 | Ministry of Defence | 17,304.4 | 13,457.3 | 3,847.1 |
| 62 | Ministry of Home Affairs | | | 840.9 |
| 63 | Ministry of Education | 41,359.7 | 39,315.9 | 2,043.8 |
| 64 | Ministry of Higher Education | 13,378.3 | 11,767.1 | 1,611.2 |
| 70 | Contingency fund | 2,000.0 | —N/a | 2,000.0 |
| Total | | 215,448.0 | 163,448.0 | 52,000.0 |
| Dependent | Description | Expenditures | Operating Expenditures | Development Expenditures |
| (1) | Royal spending for the Yang di-Pertuan Agong | 13.5 | 13.5 | —N/a |
| (2) | Royal allowances | 1.5 | 1.5 | —N/a |
| (3) | Chief Justice, Chief Judges, Judges | 90 | 90 | —N/a |
| (4) | Auditor General | 0.7 | 0.7 | —N/a |
| (5) | Speaker of the Dewan Rakyat | 1.6 | 1.6 | —N/a |
| (6) | President of the Dewan Negara | 1.8 | 1.8 | —N/a |
| (7) | Election Commission | 2.3 | 2.3 | —N/a |
| (8) | Law Services Commission | 0.05 | 0.05 | —N/a |
| (9) | Public Services Commission | 10.7 | 10.7 | —N/a |
| (10) | Education Services Commission | 5 | 5 | —N/a |
| (11) | Police Force Commission | 1.7 | 1.7 | —N/a |
| (12) | Treasury | 6,072.1 | 6,072.1 | —N/a |
| (13) | Payment for public debt | 26,639.4 | 26,639.4 | —N/a |
| (14) | Pensions, retirement allowances and rewards | 18,954.0 | 18,954.0 | —N/a |
| Total | | 51,776 | 51,776 | —N/a |
| Total Estimated Expenditure | | 267,224.0 | | |

== List of Malaysian budgets by year ==
=== Supply Bills - Second Reading ===
1960s
1960 · 1961 · 1962 · 1963 · 1964 · 1965 · 1966 · 1967 · 1968 · 1969

1970s
1973 · 1974 · 1975 · 1976 · 1977 · 1978 · 1979

1980s
1980 · 1981 · 1982 · 1983 · 1984 · 1985 · 1986 · 1987 · 1988 · 1989

1990s
1990 · 1991 · 1992 · 1993 · 1994 · 1995 · 1996 · 1997 · 1998 · 1999

2000s
2000 · 2001 · 2002 · 2003 · 2004 · 2005 · 2006 · 2007 · 2008 · 2009

2010s
2010 · 2011 · 2012 · 2013 · 2014 · 2015 · 2016 · 2017 · 2018 · 2019 ·

2020s
2020

== See also ==
- Taxation in Malaysia
- Malaysian public debt

International:

- Government budget by country
