= MRCB =

Malaysian construction and property development company

Malaysian Resources Corporation Berhad
- Formerly: Perak Carbide Corporation Sendirian Berhad (1968–1981)
- Company type: Public limited company
- Traded as: MYX: 1651
- ISIN: MYL1651OO008
- Industry: Engineering and construction; Property development
- Founded: 21 August 1968; 57 years ago (as Perak Carbide Corporation Sendirian Berhad)
- Founder: Abdul Kadir Jasin
- Headquarters: Menara Allianz Sentral; 203 Jalan Tun Sambanthan, Kuala Lumpur Sentral, Malaysia
- Key people: Azlan Zainol (Chairman); Imran Mohamad Salim (Chief executive officer/Group managing director)
- Services: Engineering; Construction; Commercial, residential and leisure property development; Property investment; Facilities management; Environmental engineering; Toll road concessions
- Revenue: ▲RM2,408 million (2016)
- Operating income: ▲RM393 million (2016)
- Net income: ▲RM319 million (2016)
- Total assets: ▲RM7,507 million (2016)
- Total equity: ▲RM3,025 million (2016)
- Subsidiaries: MRCB Land Sdn. Bhd.
- Website: www.mrcb.com.my

The Malaysian Resources Corporation Berhad (MYX: 1651, commonly referred to as MRCB) is a Malaysian construction and property development company based in Kuala Lumpur. It is the master developer of the Kuala Lumpur Sentral transport hub and business district.

With the EPF as a significant shareholder (38 percent), MRCB is considered a government-linked company (GLC) in Malaysian business circles.

== History ==
MRCB was founded in 1968 as Perak Carbide Corporation Sdn Bhd, a carbide manufacturer, and went public in 1971. In 1981, it shifted its business focus to property development and took on its present name.

Since the 1990s, MRCB has led a consortium also comprising Keretapi Tanah Melayu and Pembinaan Redzai to develop and construct KL Sentral, the largest transportation hub in Malaysia. KL Sentral is the intersection of KTM Komuter, ETS, Rapid Rail (LRT and monorail), Express Rail Link to Kuala Lumpur International Airport and the newly opened KVMRT Sungai Buloh-Kajang line. The business district is also home to major local corporations including UEM, CIMB and Axiata, and the Malaysian headquarters of foreign multinationals such as Shell and General Electric. As of 2015, KL Sentral is almost fully developed aside from two lots set aside for future projects.

Township projects developed by MRCB include 9 Seputeh and Kota Semarak in the periphery of Kuala Lumpur. As of 2015, major projects in the pipeline include Penang Sentral, a similar transport hub for the northern city of Penang, PJ Sentral, a mixed residential and commercial development in the KL suburb of Petaling Jaya, and refurbishment of the Bukit Jalil National Stadium. It is also a joint venturer in the development of the town centre in the 2,330-acre Kwasa Damansara township in the Klang Valley, which is owned by its major shareholder, the Employees Provident Fund (EPF).

== Notable projects ==
- Kuala Lumpur Sentral
- Penang Sentral
- Kwasa Sentral
