= Kwasa Damansara =

- Town

Other transcription(s)
  - Jawi: كواس دامنسارا
  - Chinese: 桂莎白沙罗 (Simplified) 桂莎白沙羅 (Traditional)
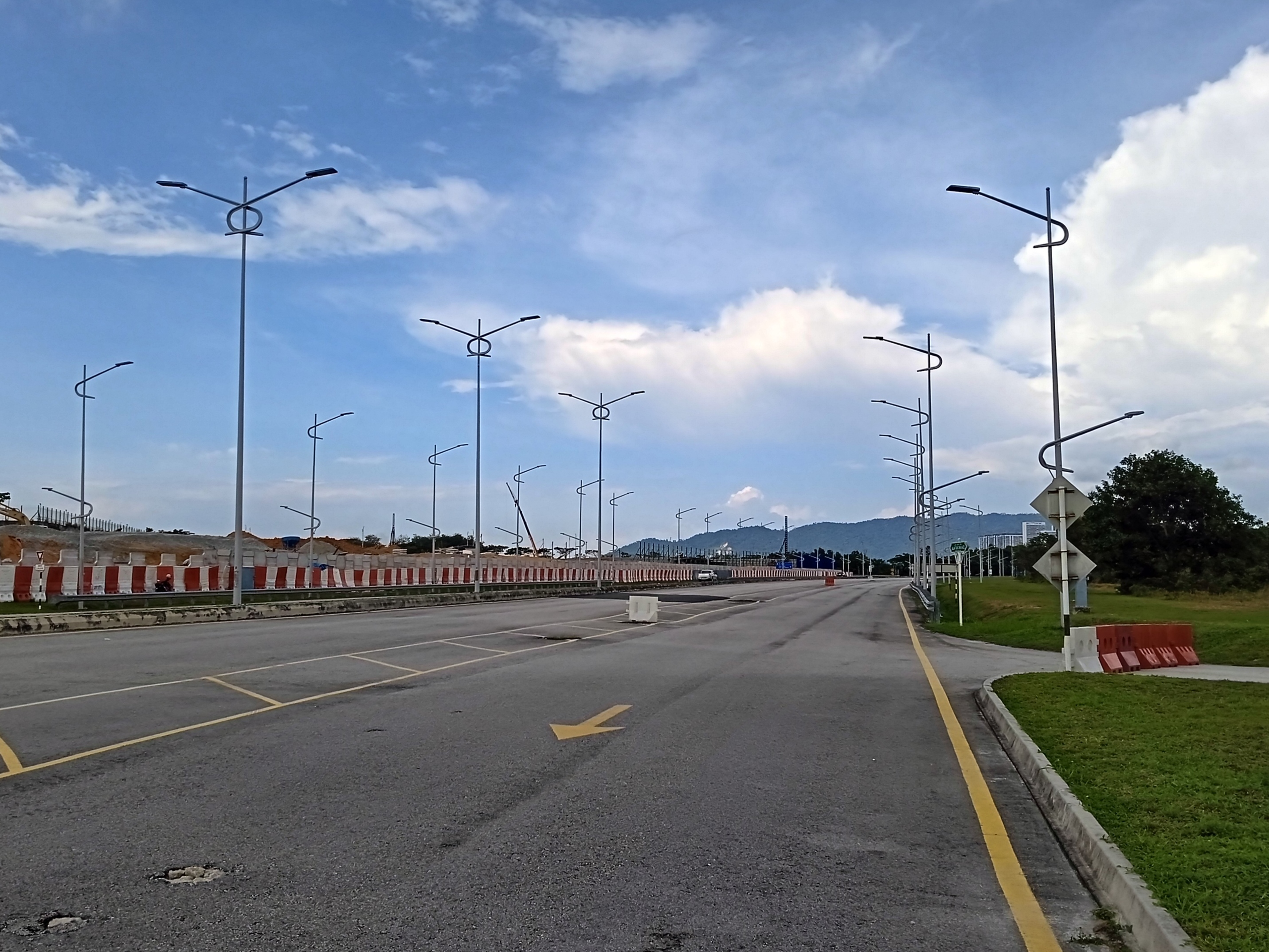

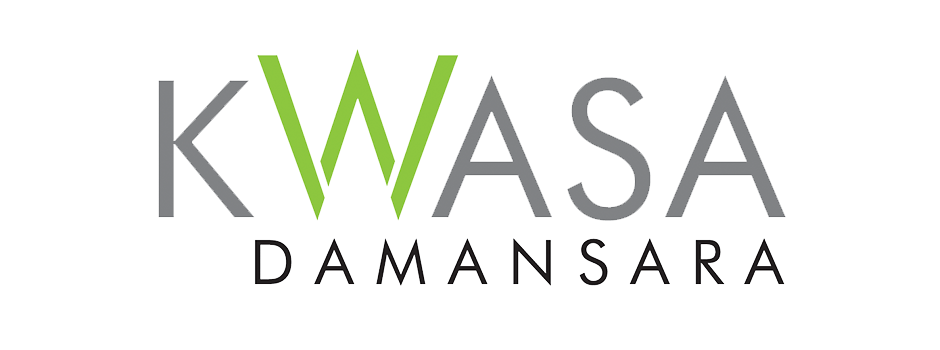

- Location in Selangor and Peninsular Malaysia Kwasa Damansara (Peninsular Malaysia)
- Coordinates: 3°10′N 101°34′E
- Country: Malaysia
- State: Selangor
- Establishment: 2012

Area
  - Total: 9.39 km^{2} (3.63 sq mi)
- Time zone: UTC+8 (MST)
  - Summer (DST): Not observed
- Website: kwasadamansara.com.my

Kwasa Damansara is a new township located in the Sungai Buloh constituency of Selangor, Malaysia. Located 14 km northwest of Kuala Lumpur's central business district, it borders Kota Damansara to the south and Sungai Buloh to the north.

Currently in the process of development and construction, the development project is expected to take place over 20 years from 2015 and is part of the Greater Kuala Lumpur Strategic Development Project under the 10th Malaysia Plan announced in 2010.

== Background ==
The project is located on a 2330-acre (939-hectare) site formerly occupied by an estate of the Rubber Research Institute of Malaysia (RRIM) in Sungai Buloh. In 2010, then-prime minister Najib Razak announced that the land was being earmarked for development. In 2012, Kwasa Land Sdn Bhd, a subsidiary of the Employees Provident Fund, purchased the land for RM2.3 billion and was tasked as the master developer for the proposed township.

== Features ==
Located along the Sungai Buloh-Subang Jaya road, about halfway between Sungai Buloh and the Subang Airport, the township is expected to include residential, commercial, educational and recreational development. The Klang Valley Mass Rapid Transit (MRT) is also connected to the township, having two stations in the area. An estimated 150,000 people will reside in the township.

The total land stretches across two local authorities; the northern portion is located within the city boundaries of Shah Alam while the southern portion is in Petaling Jaya.

== Kwasa Land ==
Kwasa Land Sdn Bhd
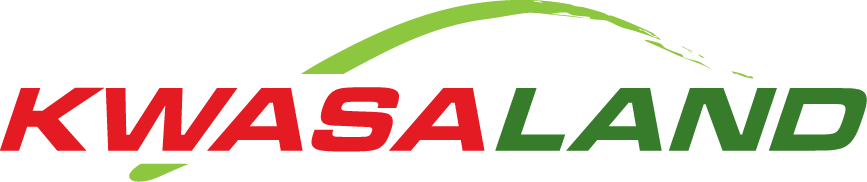
- Type: Private limited company
- Industry: Property development
- Founded: 2010; 16 years ago
- Headquarters: Sungai Buloh, Malaysia
- Key people: Datuk Seri Michael K C Yam (Chairman); Mohamad Hafiz Kassim (Managing Director)
- Parent: Employees Provident Fund
- Website: www.kwasadamansara.com.my

Kwasa Land Sdn Bhd is the master developer of the Kwasa Damansara township. A subsidiary of the Employees Provident Fund - the Malaysian pension fund - it was formed in 2010 to execute the EPF's mandate to develop the rubber estate formerly owned by the Malaysian Rubber Board and used for research by Rubber Research Institute Malaysia (RRIM). In September 2011, it appointed Mohamad Lofty Mohamad Noh – head of property investment at EPF – as managing director.

The EPF is reported to be in the process of relocating its headquarters - currently located at Jalan Raja Laut in downtown Kuala Lumpur - to Kwasa Damansara by 2022. The relocation will began gradually in early of June 2023, confirmed by the new EPF Director. The new headquarters had been officially launched by 10th Prime Minister on 8 May 2023.

== Developments ==
As the master developer of the township, Kwasa Land has contracted out developments of individual parcels under the master plan to other developers. As of May 2015, five projects have been announced: the town centre Project MX-1, and residential Projects R2-1, R3-2, R3-3 and R3-4.

The town centre, code-named MX-1, with a size of 64 acres (26 ha) and gross development value (GDV) of RM8 billion, will be jointly developed by Kwasa Land and MRCB. This part will include three shopping centres, a hotel, residential areas and an MRT station.

Project R3-2, with a size of 8.79 acres (3.56 ha) and GDV of RM400 million, was awarded to Impiana Land & Development Sdn Bhd.

Bidding for the remaining projects was ongoing as of May 2015.

== Access ==
=== Public transportation ===
The township is primarily served by the Kwasa Damansara MRT station, and the Kwasa Sentral MRT station.

=== Car ===
The Subang Airport Highway Federal Route 15 is the main route into this township.

=== Air ===
Kwasa Damansara is 5.5 km northeast of the Subang Airport (IATA: SZB). Rapid KL bus T804 connects Kwasa Sentral MRT station to the airport terminal building.
