= Kwasa Damansara MRT station =

Railway station in Kwasa Damansara, Malaysia

KG04 PY01 Kwasa Damansara
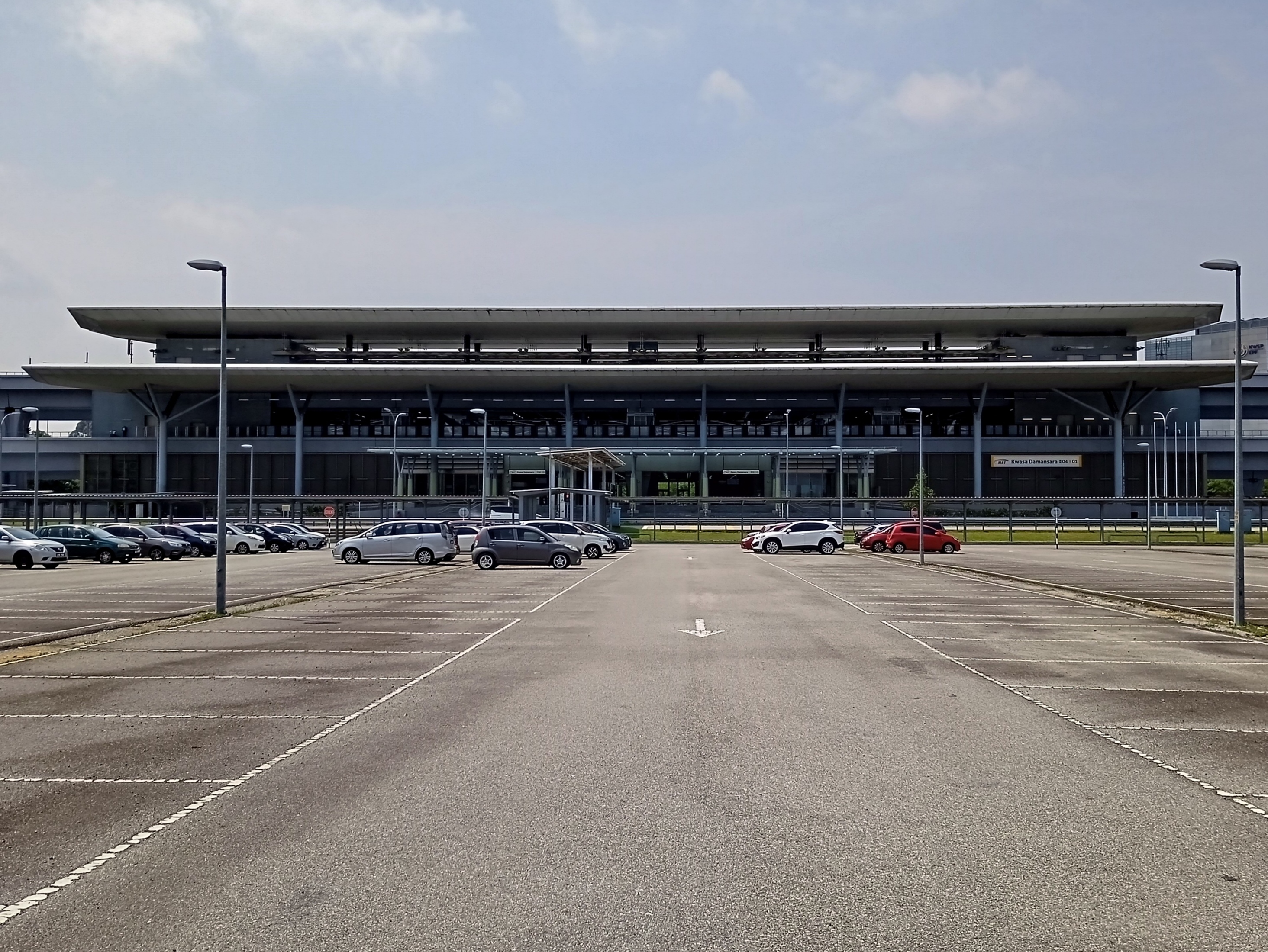
- Exterior view of the station seen from the Park N' Ride area in front of Pintu A

General information
- Other names: Malay: کواس دامنسارا (Jawi); Chinese: 桂莎白沙罗; Tamil: குவாசா டாமன்சாரா
- Location: Kwasa Damansara, Seksyen U4, 40160 Shah Alam; Selangor; Malaysia
- Coordinates: 3°10′35.3″N 101°34′21.2″E
- System: Rapid KL
- Owner: MRT Corp
- Operator: Rapid Rail
- Lines: 9 Kajang Line; 12 Putrajaya Line
- Platforms: 2 stacked island platforms
- Tracks: 4

Construction
- Structure type: Elevated
- Platform levels: 2
- Parking: Available with payment. 550 parking bays; 100 motorcycle bays.
- Cycle facilities: Available. 46 bicycle bays, 2 disabled bicycle bays
- Accessible: Yes

Other information
- Station code: KG04 PY01

History
- Opened: 16 December 2016; 9 years ago (Kajang Line); 16 June 2022; 4 years ago (Putrajaya Line)
- Former names: Kota Damansara

Services
Preceding station		Following station
Terminus	Kajang Line	Kwasa Sentral towards Kajang
Terminus	Putrajaya Line	Kampung Selamat towards Putrajaya Sentral
Location

The Kwasa Damansara MRT station is a mass rapid transit (MRT) station that serves the future township of Kwasa Damansara in Selangor, Malaysia, which is currently being developed. It is the first station and northern terminus of both the MRT Kajang Line and MRT Putrajaya Line.

The ceremony to launch Phase One of the Kajang Line by then Prime Minister of Malaysia Najib Razak was held at this station on 15 December 2016, and the station was officially opened on 16 December 2016. The station later became an interchange station between the MRT Kajang Line and the MRT Putrajaya Line which opened to the public on 16 June 2022. Both lines currently terminate at this station.

== Station features ==
=== Station location ===
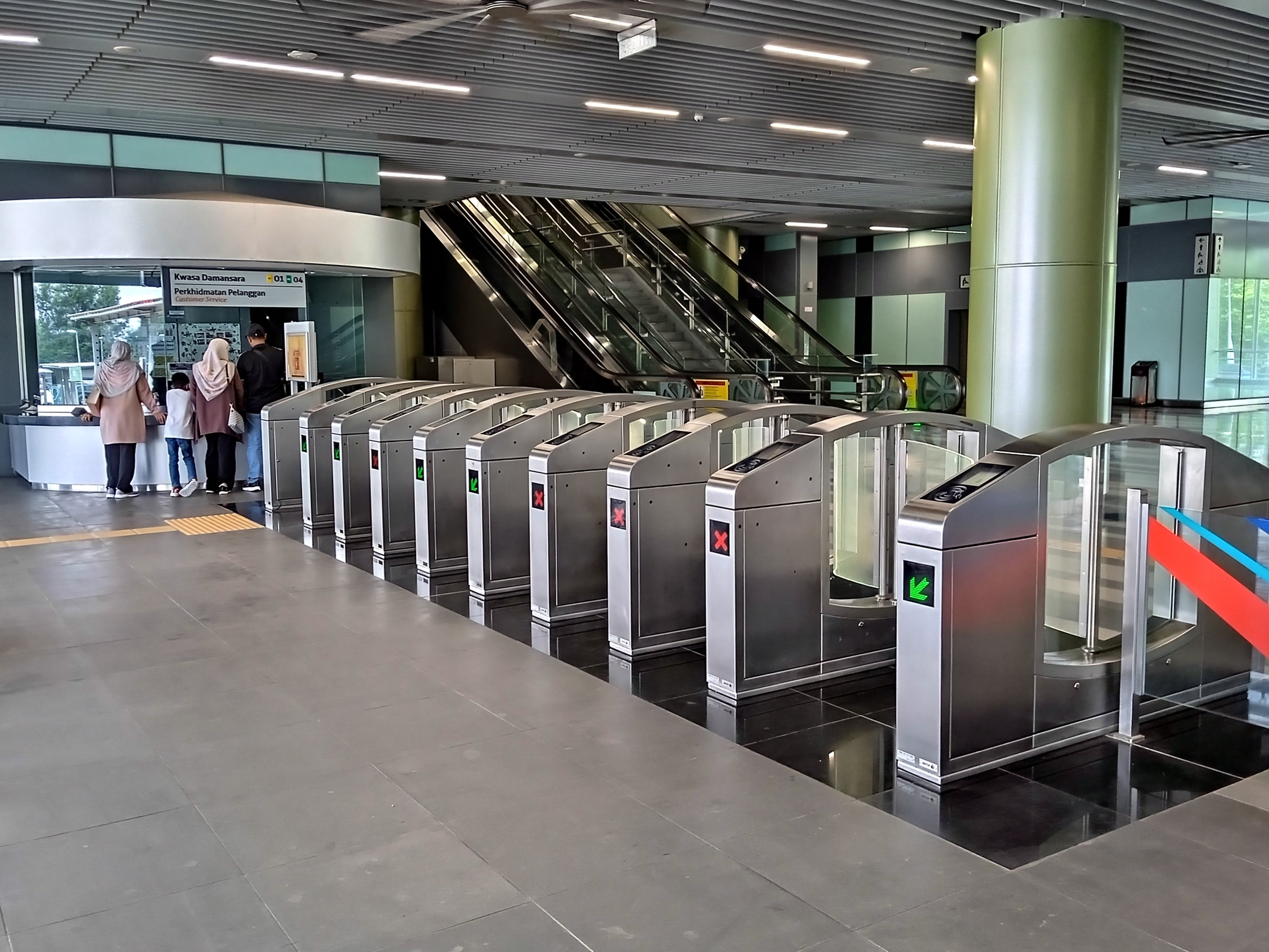
Concourse of the station

The station is located within the Kwasa Damansara development project, one of two stations to serve this future township. As it is located off Jalan Sungai Buloh, a new access road to the station was built.

Although the tracks at the station are elevated, the station building itself is at-grade, the only one of its kind on the Kajang Line, but similar to several stations on the Kelana Jaya Line.

The station has three levels, with the ground floor being the concourse and the two floors above being platform levels. The two elevated platforms are island platforms, allowing the station to have four platforms to enable it to function as a cross-platform interchange between Kajang Line and the Putrajaya Line.

Platform 1 is dedicated for Kajang-bound trains of the Kajang Line. This platform is on Level 2. On the same level is Platform 4, which is used as the terminus of the Putrajaya Line. On Level 1, Platform 2 functions as the terminus for the Kajang Line. Platform 3, across from Platform 2, is for Putrajaya Sentral-bound trains of the Putrajaya Line.

== History ==
During the early stages of the project before the finalisation of station names, the station was referred to by the working name Kota Damansara MRT Station. The name Kota Damansara initially caused some confusion; as there was another station named Kota Damansara two stations down. This station would eventually be given the name Kwasa Damansara.

=== Station layout ===
L2	Platform 1	9 Kajang Line towards KG35 Kajang (←)
L2	Island platform
L2	Platform 4	12 Putrajaya Line Terminus
L1	Platform 2	9 Kajang Line Terminus
L1	Island platform
L1	Platform 3	12 Putrajaya Line towards PY41 Putrajaya Sentral (→)
G	Concourse	Fare gates into paid area, escalators and lifts to platforms, Main entrance, Taxi lay-by, Kiss and ride lay-by, Walkway to park and ride, Staff parking

=== Exits and entrances ===
The station currently has one entrance – Entrance A – although the design caters to future entrances when the area surrounding the station is developed. The entrance currently leads to the station access road and the park and ride facility.

Kajang Line and Putrajaya Line station
Entrance	Location	Destination	Picture
A	West side of the station	Taxi and private vehicle lay-by, Park N' Ride	

=== Integrated MRT station ===
When Phase One operations for the Putrajaya Line began on 16 June 2022, this station became the northern terminus of the line. At the same time, this station replaced Sungai Buloh station as the northern terminus of the Kajang Line.

As a result, the Kampung Selamat and Sungai Buloh stations which were formerly part of the Kajang Line were transferred to the Putrajaya Line.

== Gallery ==
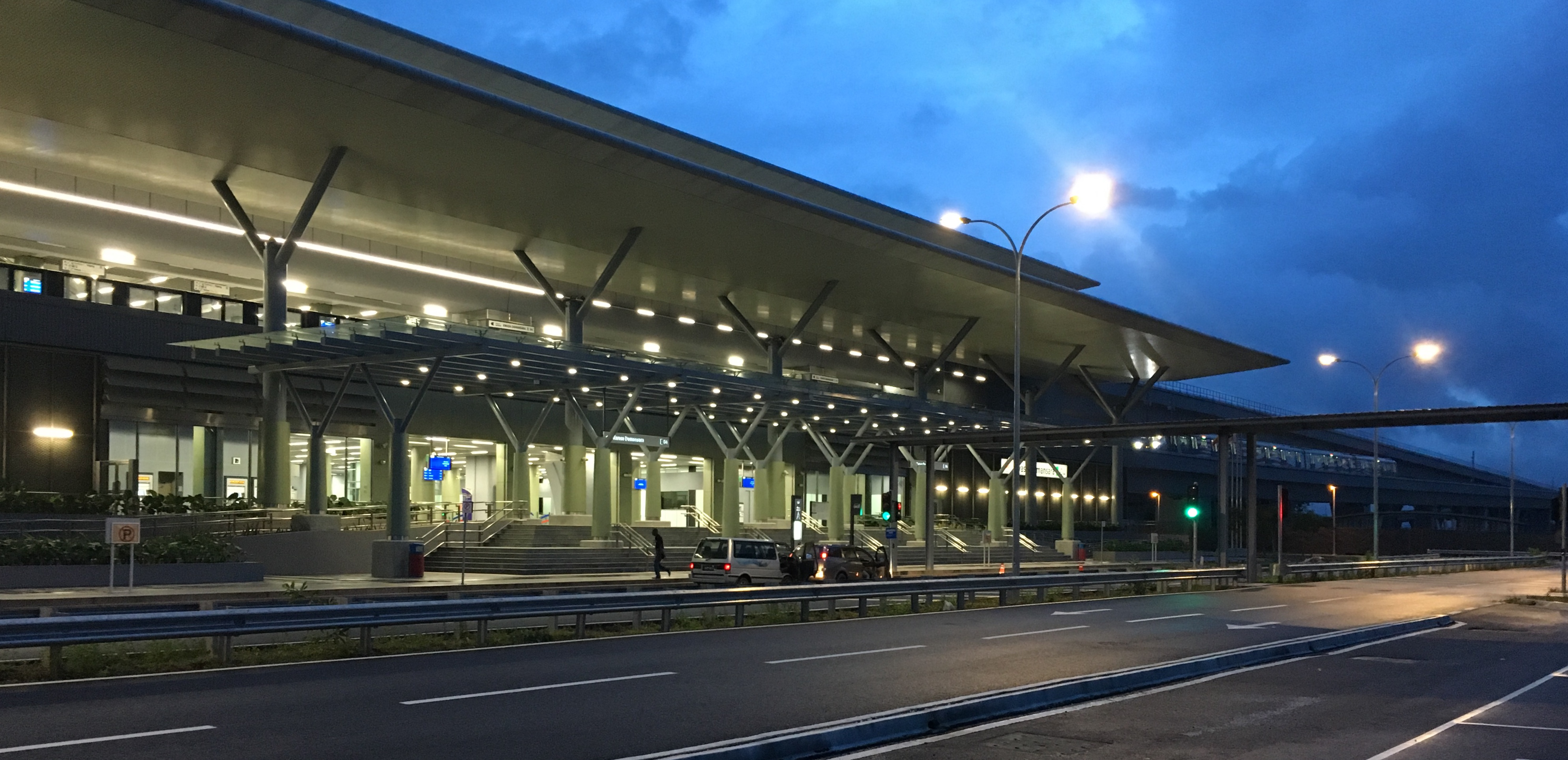
View of the front of the station which faces the Park N' Ride facility

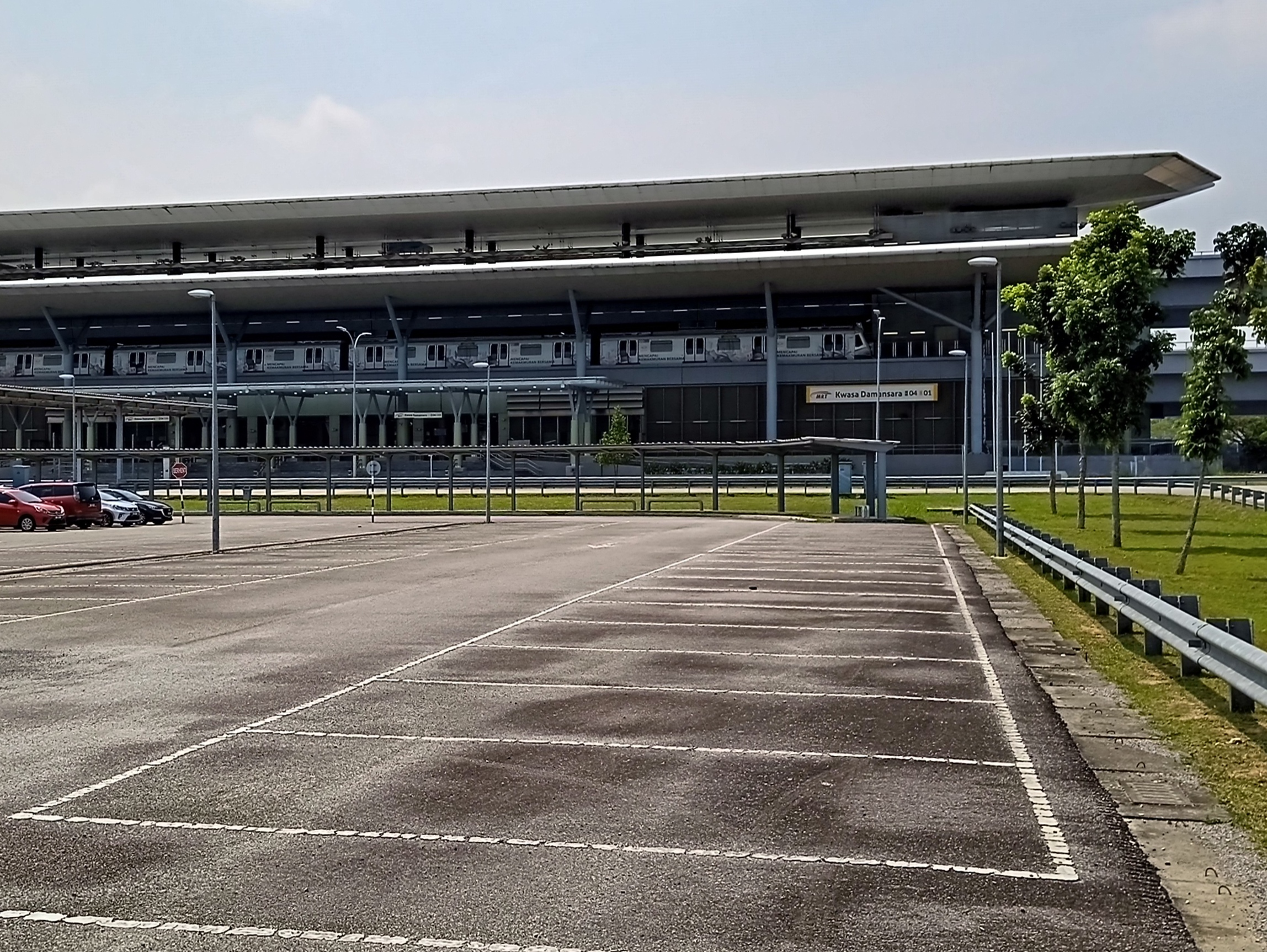
Exterior view of the station

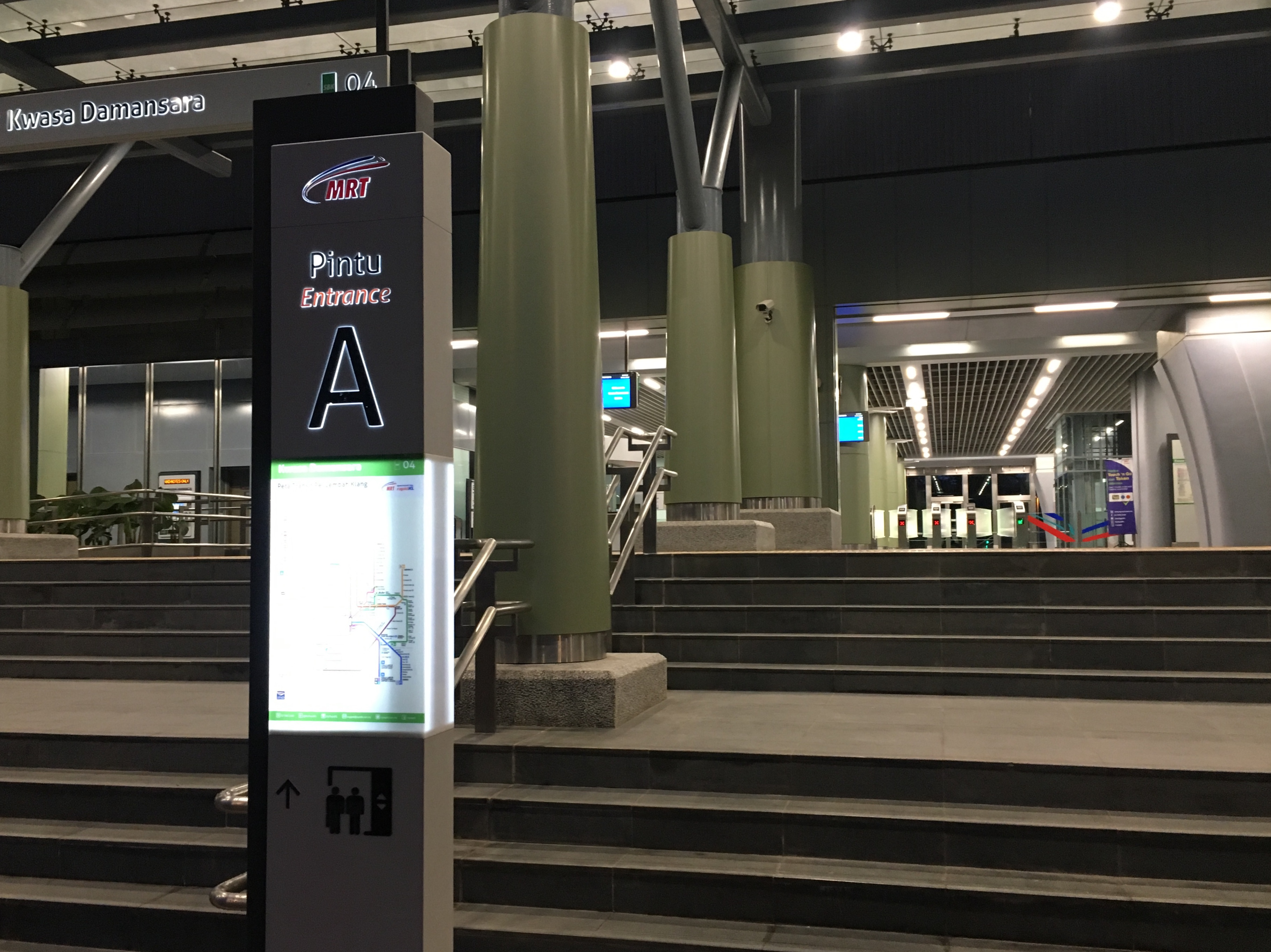
Entrance A of the station

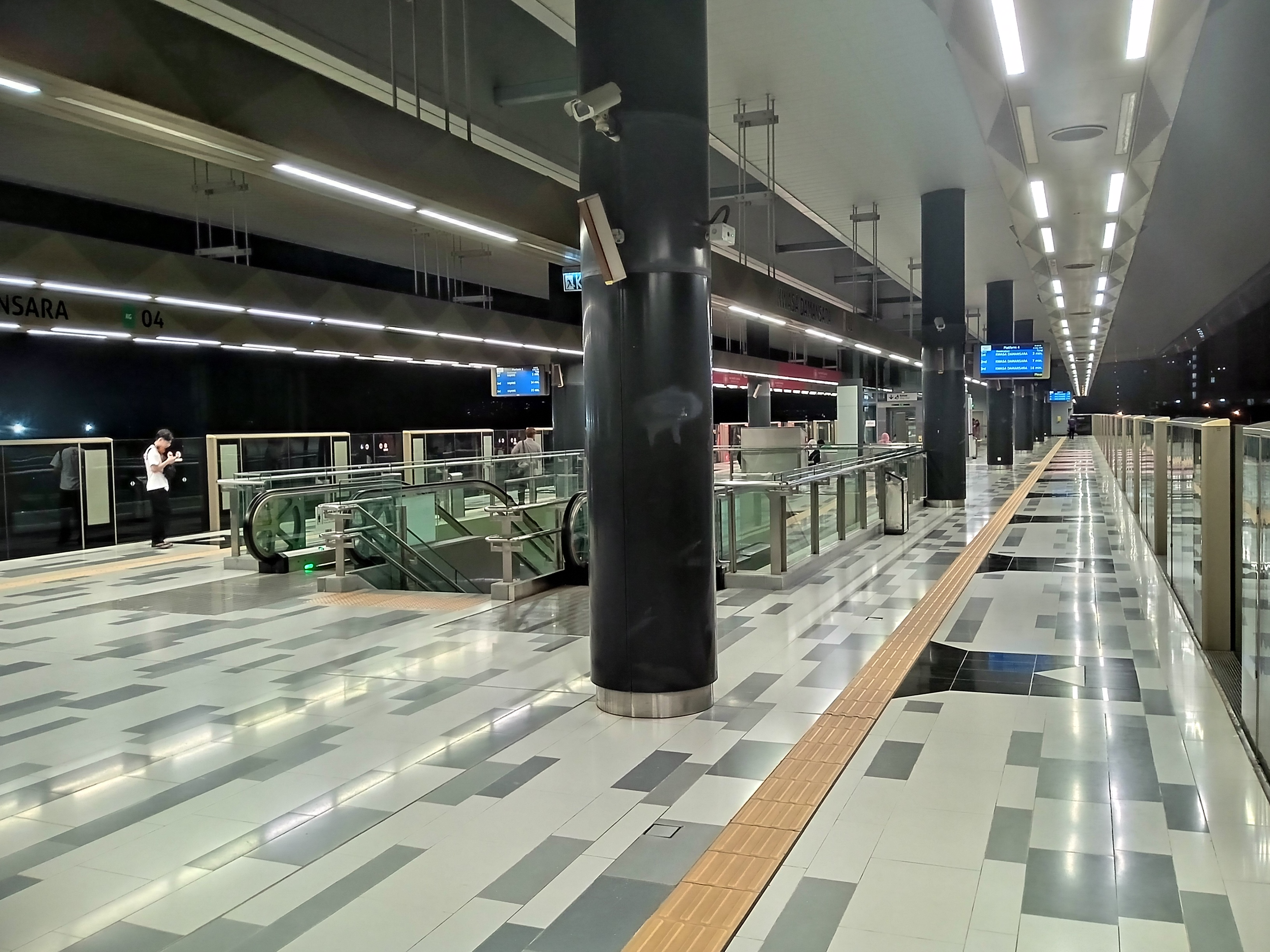
View of upper platform level (L2)

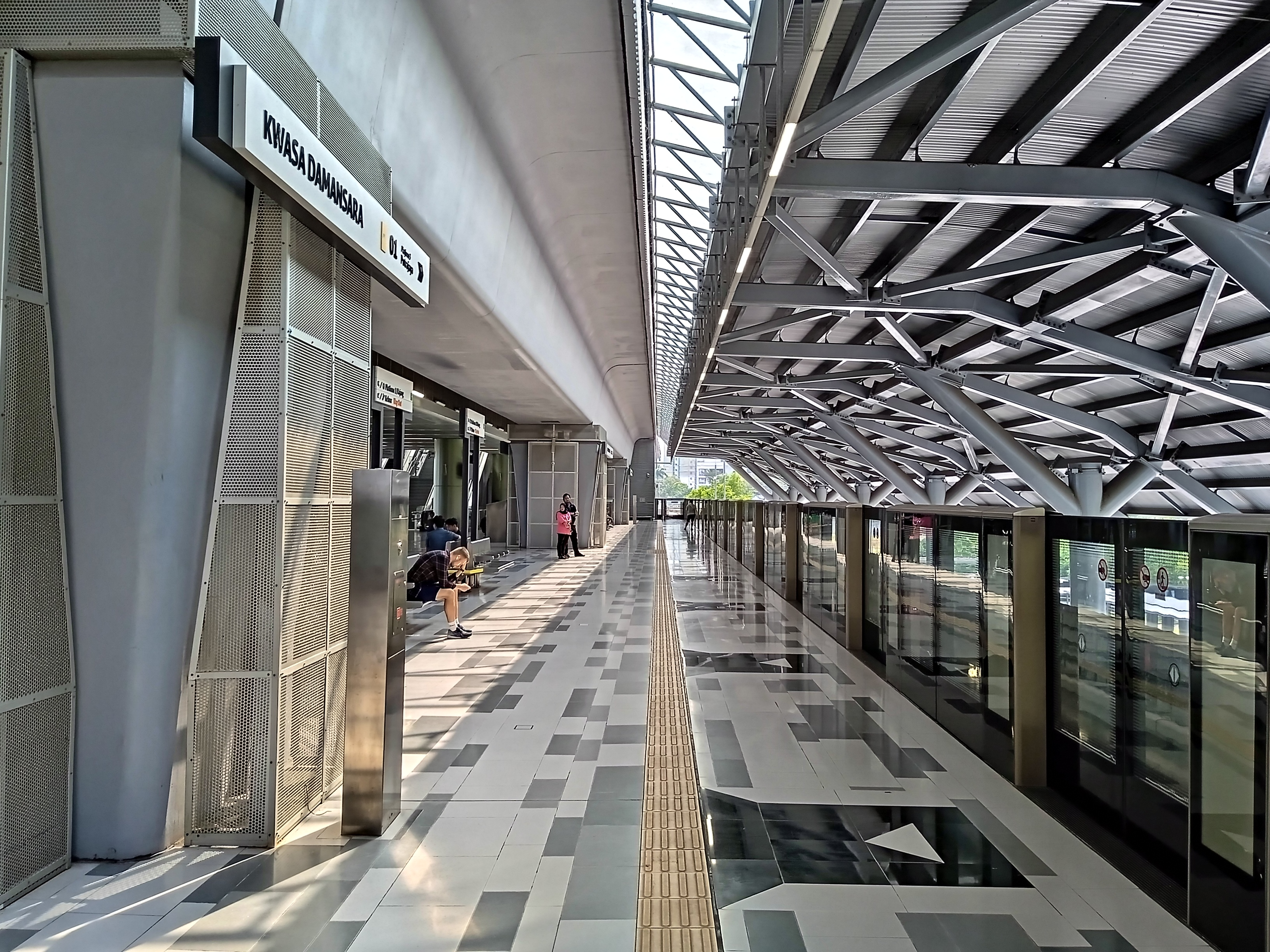
View of lower platform level (L1)

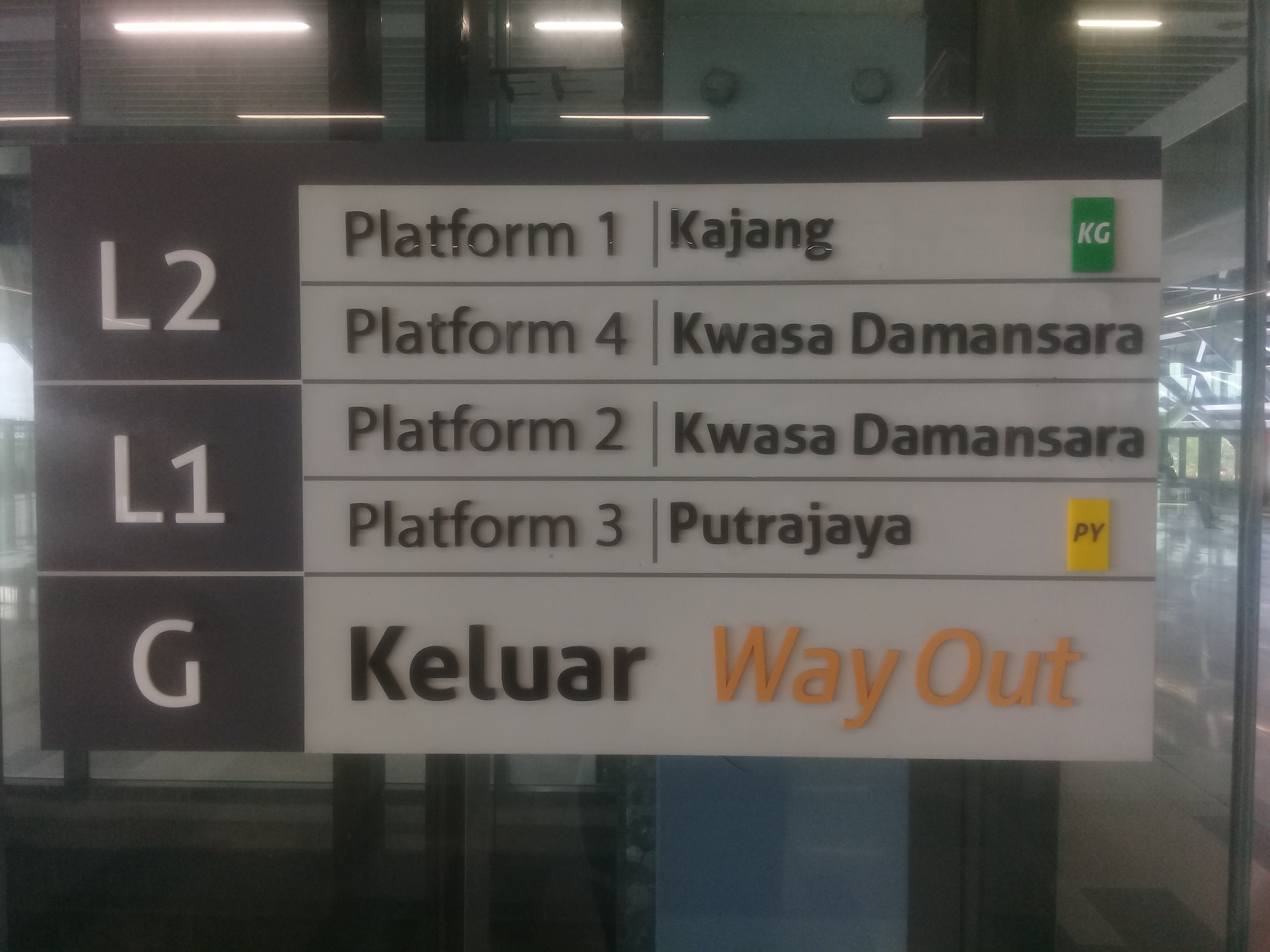
Kwasa Damansara level and platform signage. Showing platform 4 dedicated for Putrajaya Line

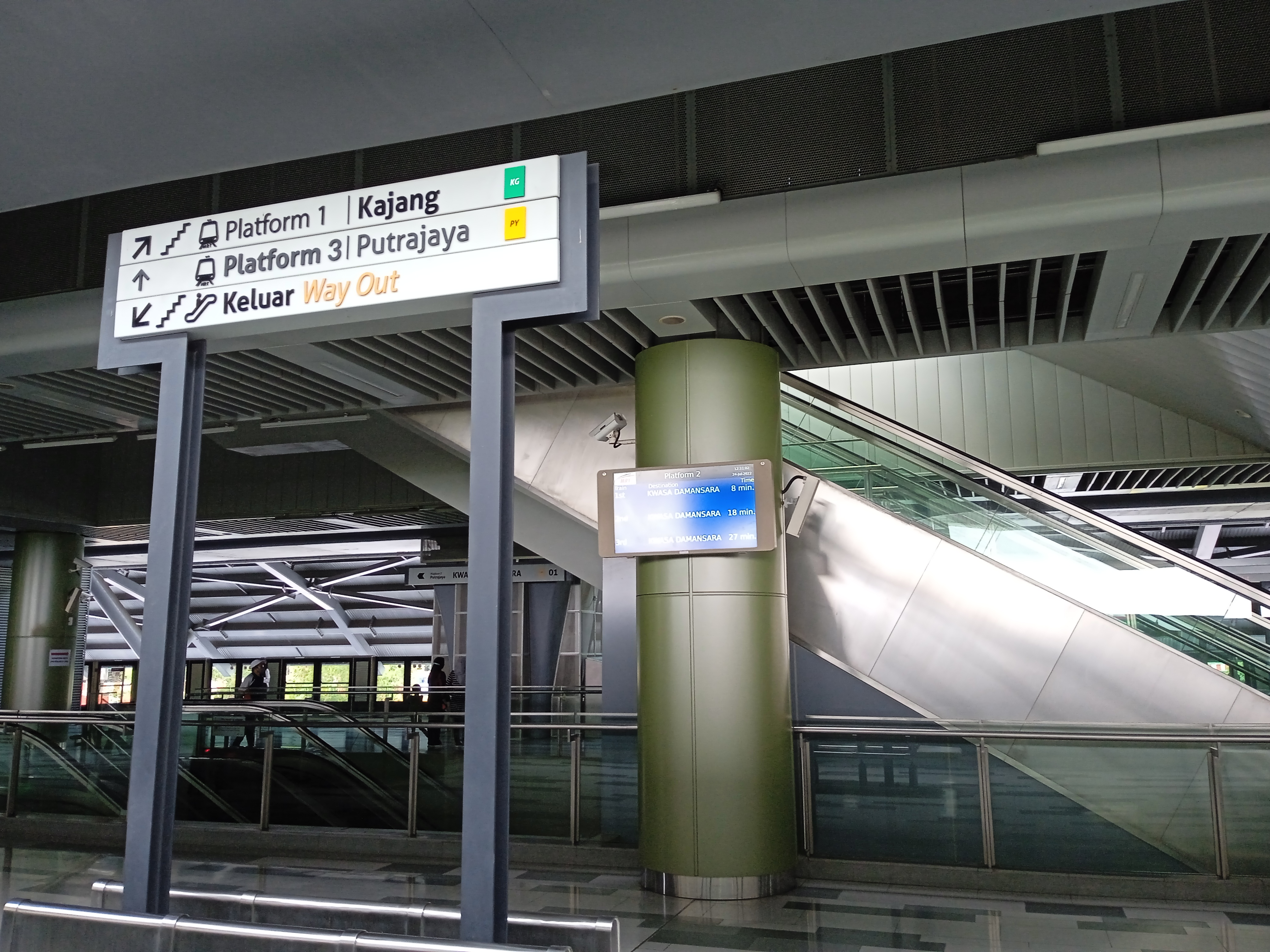
The island on level 1 of Kwasa Damansara MRT station

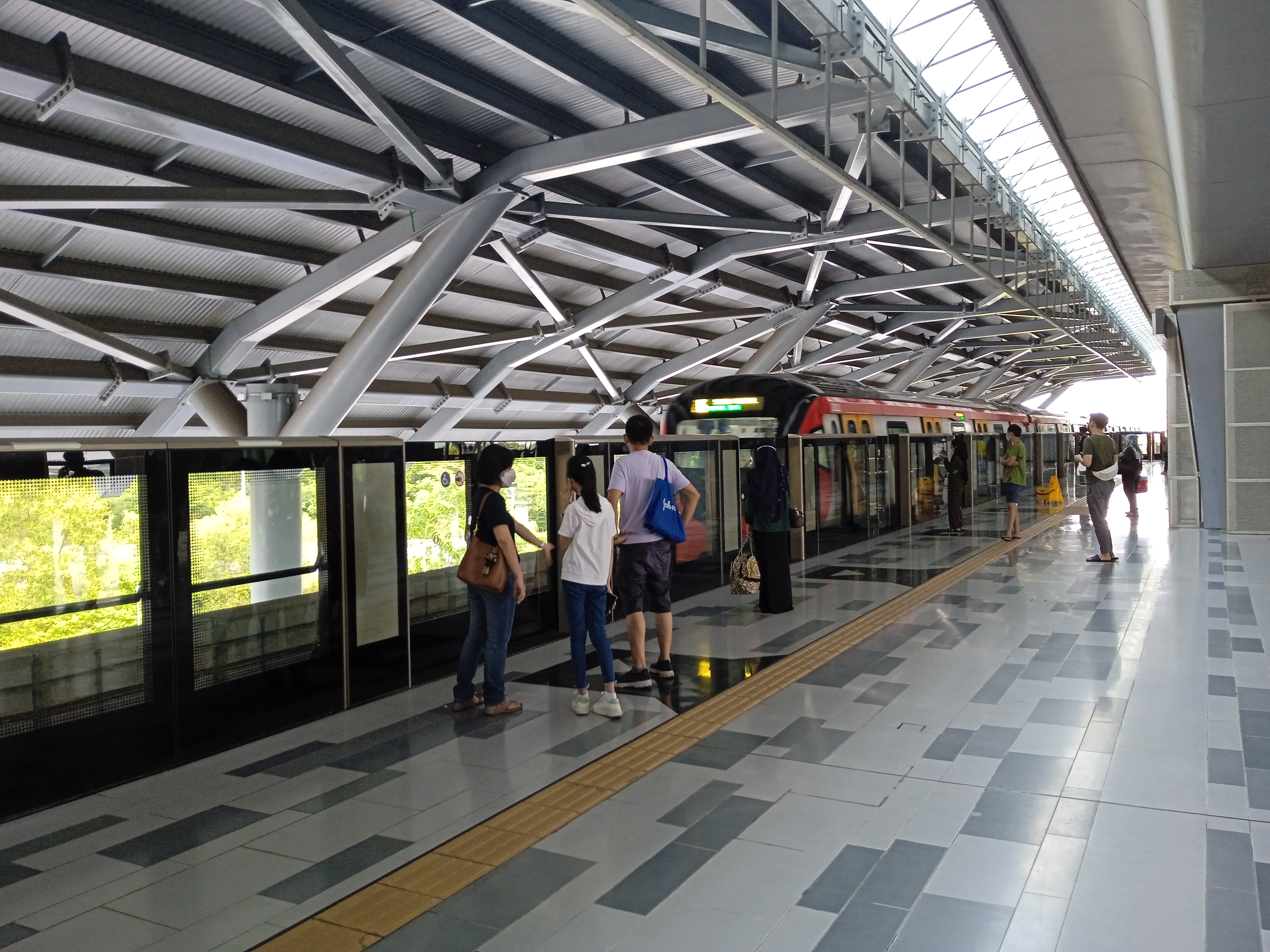
MRT Putrajaya Line train approach the station

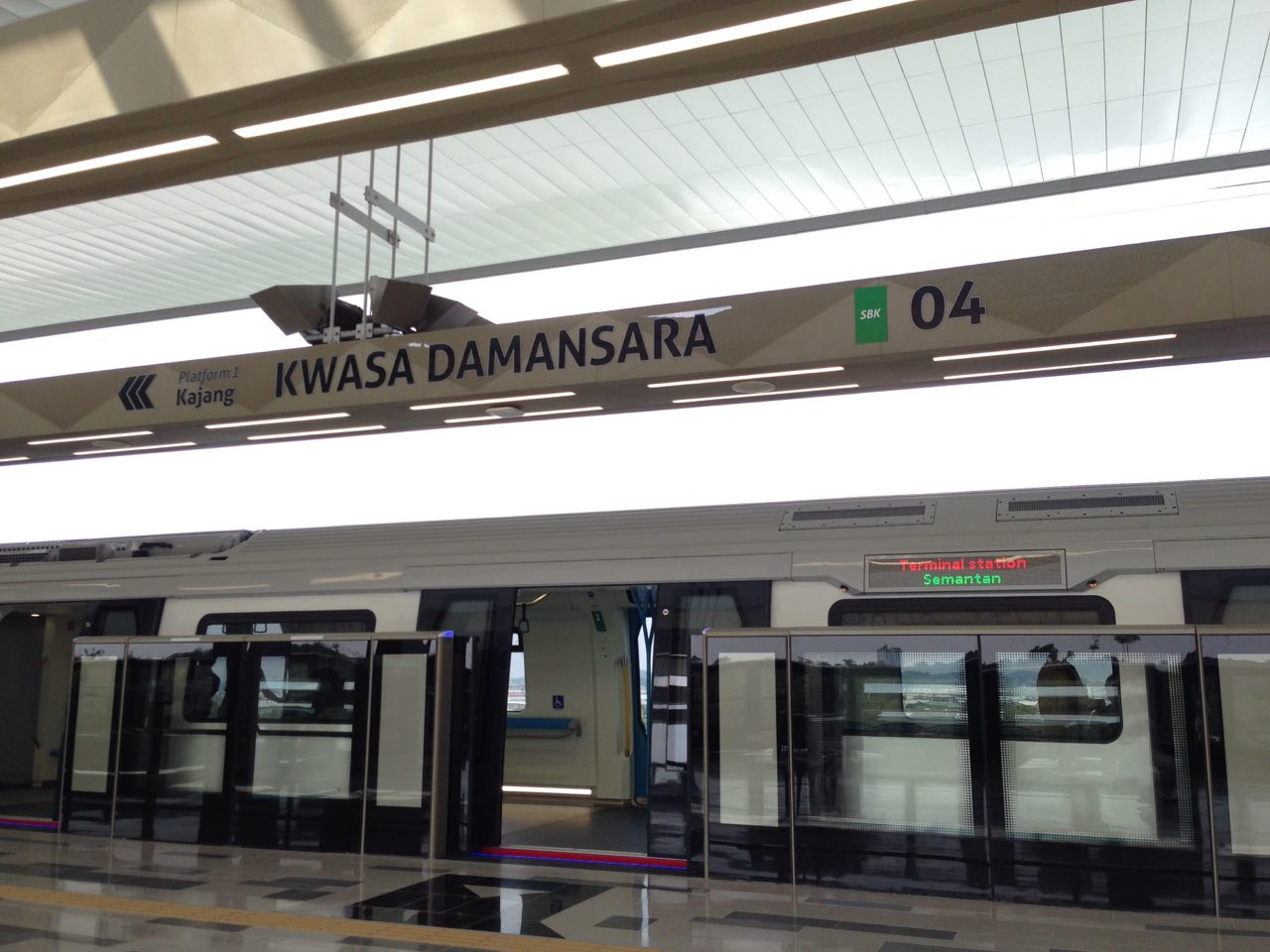
Platform 1 on level 2

The Putrajaya Line train is entering the Kwasa Damansara station

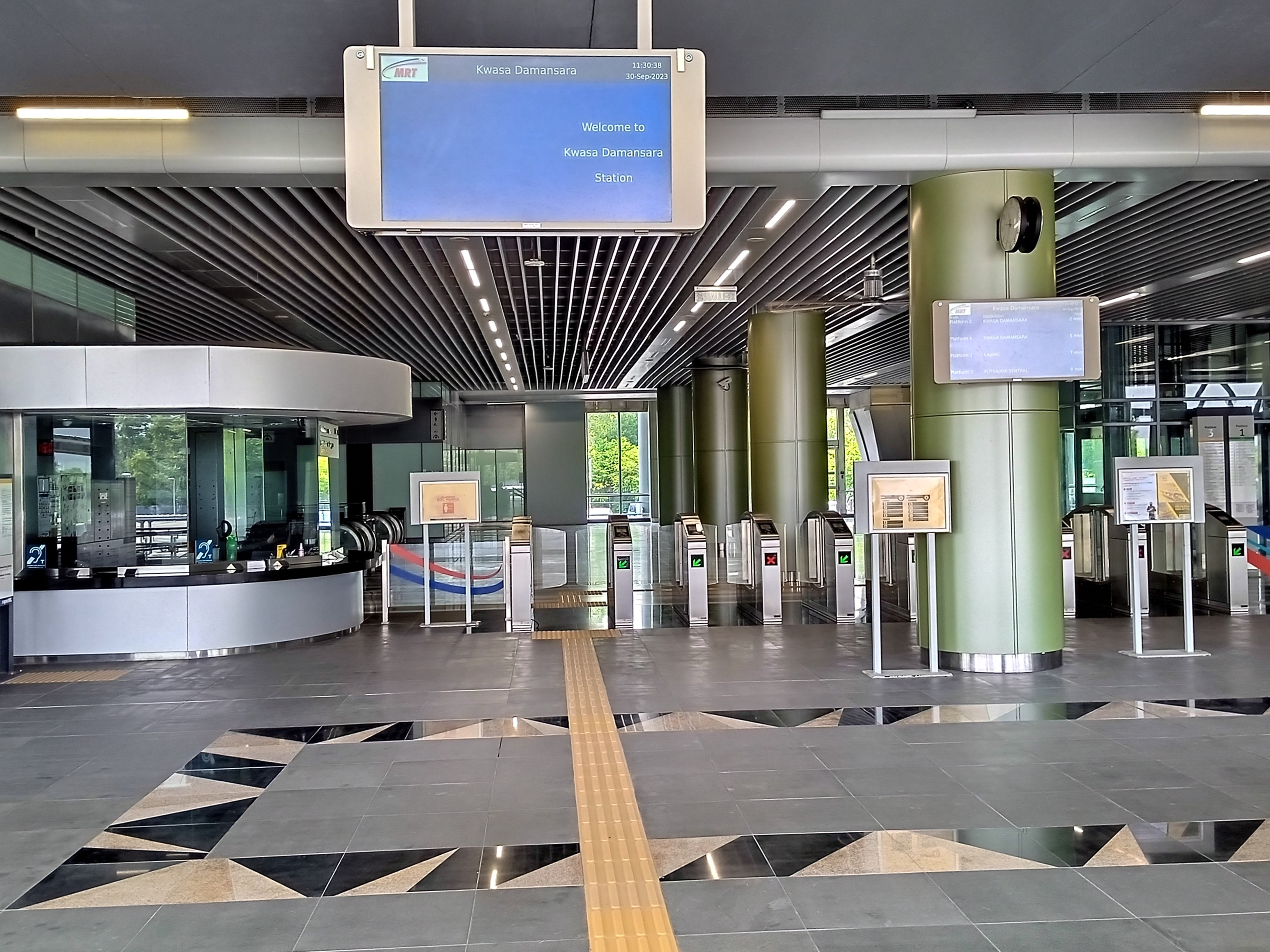
Concourse of the station

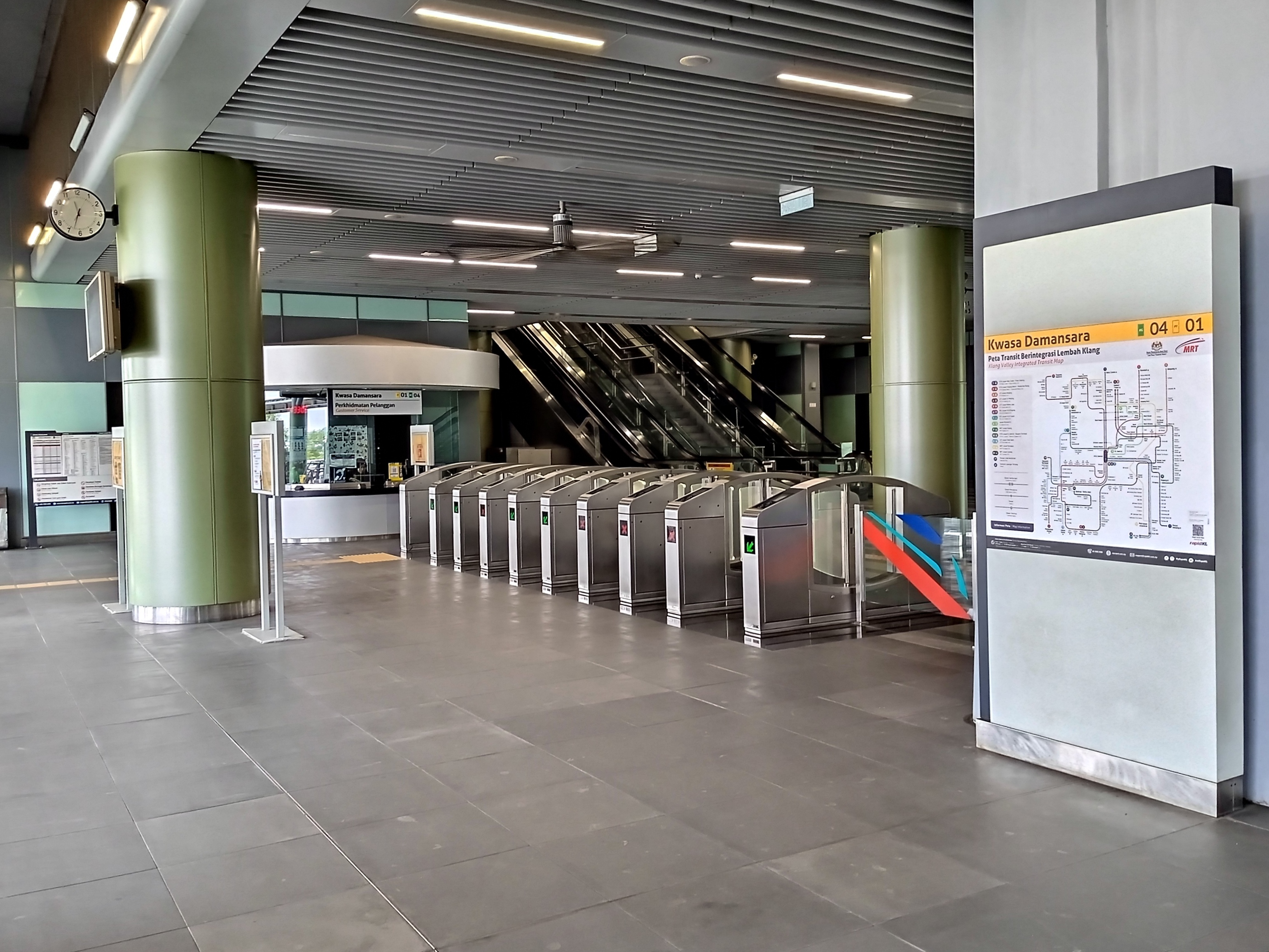
Concourse of the station

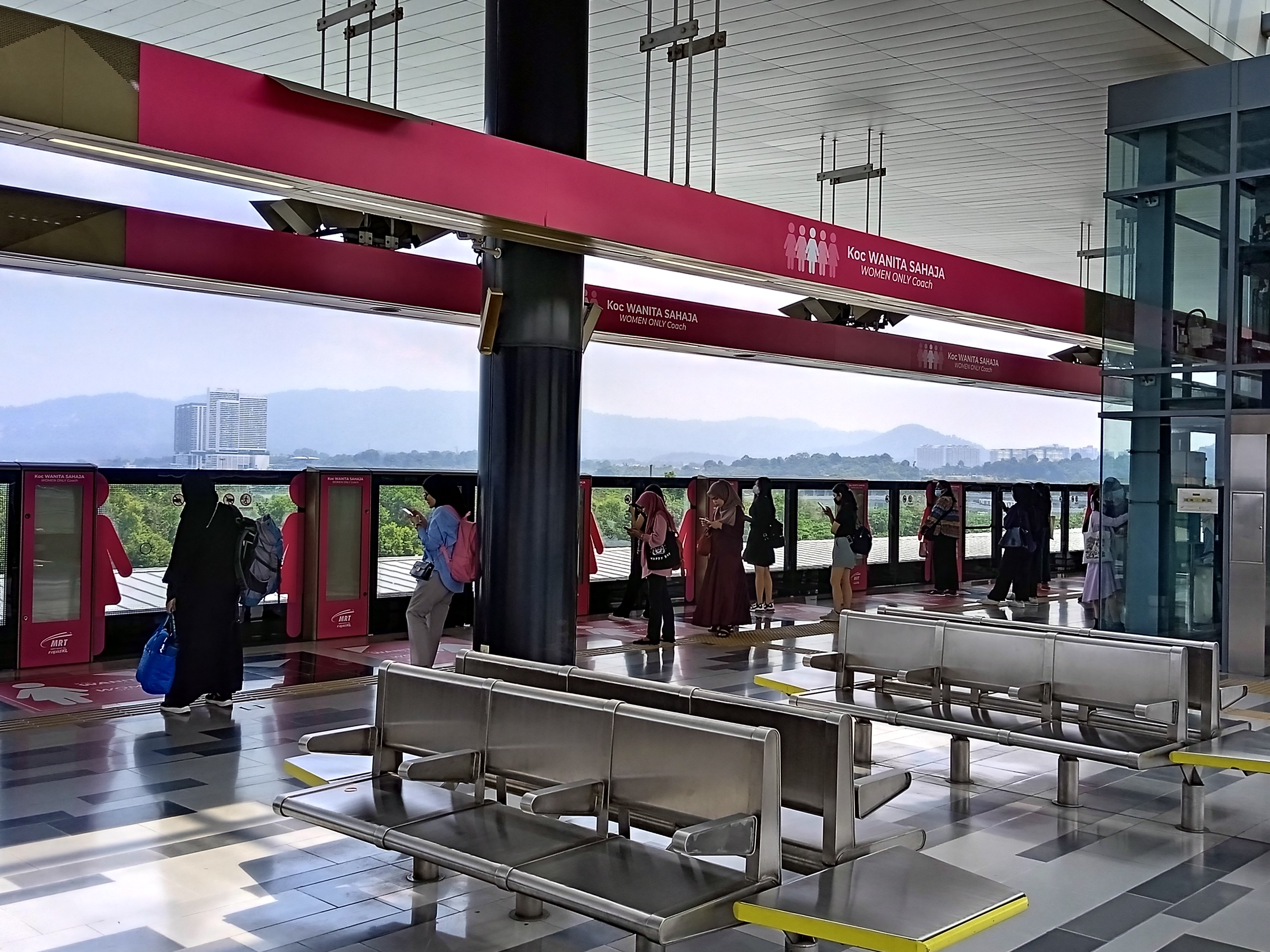
Women's only coach area at the platform of the station

== See also ==
- SP31 KJ37 Putra Heights LRT station, similar cross-platform concept
