= Kwasa Sentral MRT station =

MRT station in Shah Alam, Selangor, Malaysia

KG05 Kwasa Sentral
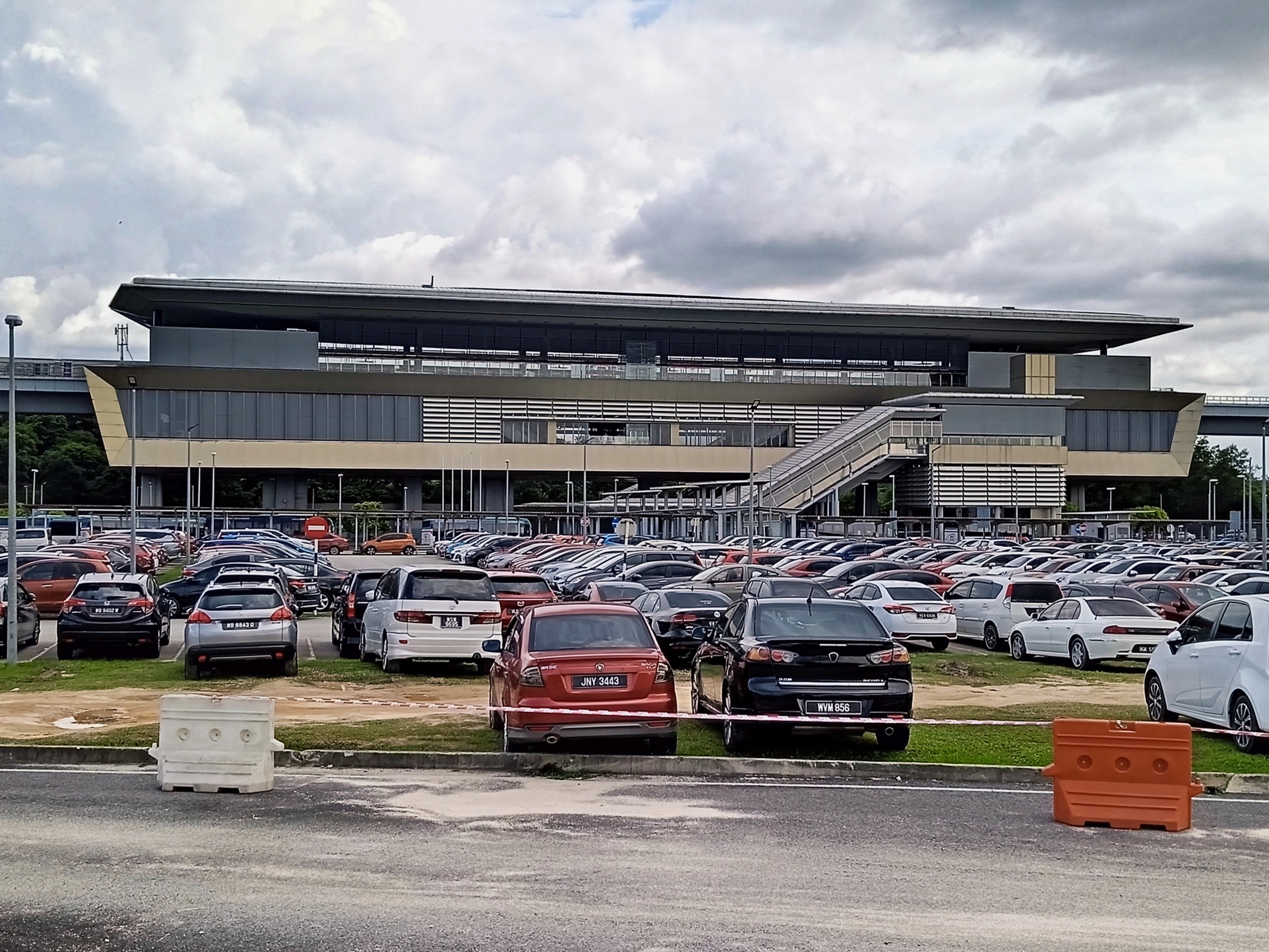
- Exterior view of the station.

General information
- Other names: Malay: کواس سينترل (Jawi); Chinese: 桂莎中环; Tamil: குவாசா சென்ட்ரல்
- Location: Kwasa Damansara, Seksyen U4, 40160 Shah Alam; Selangor; Malaysia
- Coordinates: 3°10′11.69″N 101°33′53.26″E
- System: Rapid KL
- Owner: MRT Corp
- Operator: Rapid Rail
- Line: 9 Kajang Line
- Platforms: 2 side platforms
- Tracks: 2

Construction
- Structure type: Elevated
- Parking: Available with payment. 505 parking bays; 100 motorcycle bays.
- Cycle facilities: Available. 8 bicycle bays.
- Accessible: Yes

Other information
- Station code: KG05

History
- Opened: 16 December 2016; 9 years ago
- Former names: Taman Industri Sungai Buloh

Services
Preceding station		Following station
Kwasa Damansara Terminus	Kajang Line	Kota Damansara towards Kajang
Location

The Kwasa Sentral MRT station is a mass rapid transit (MRT) station serving the future development project known as Kwasa Damansara in Section U4 of Shah Alam, Selangor, Malaysia. It is one of the stations of the MRT Kajang Line, and was opened on 16 December 2016 under Phase One operations of the line.

== Station features ==
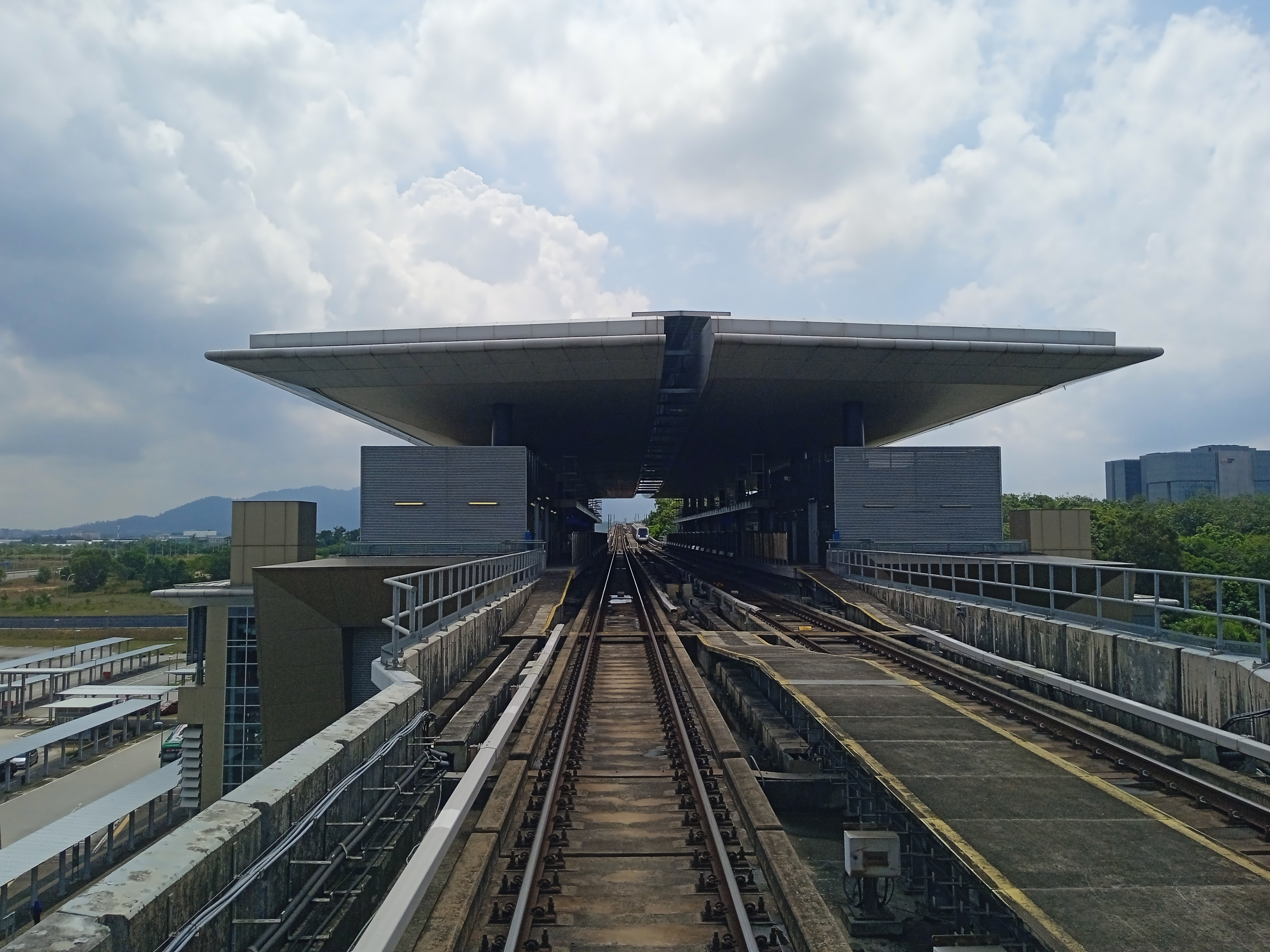
View of station from an approaching train

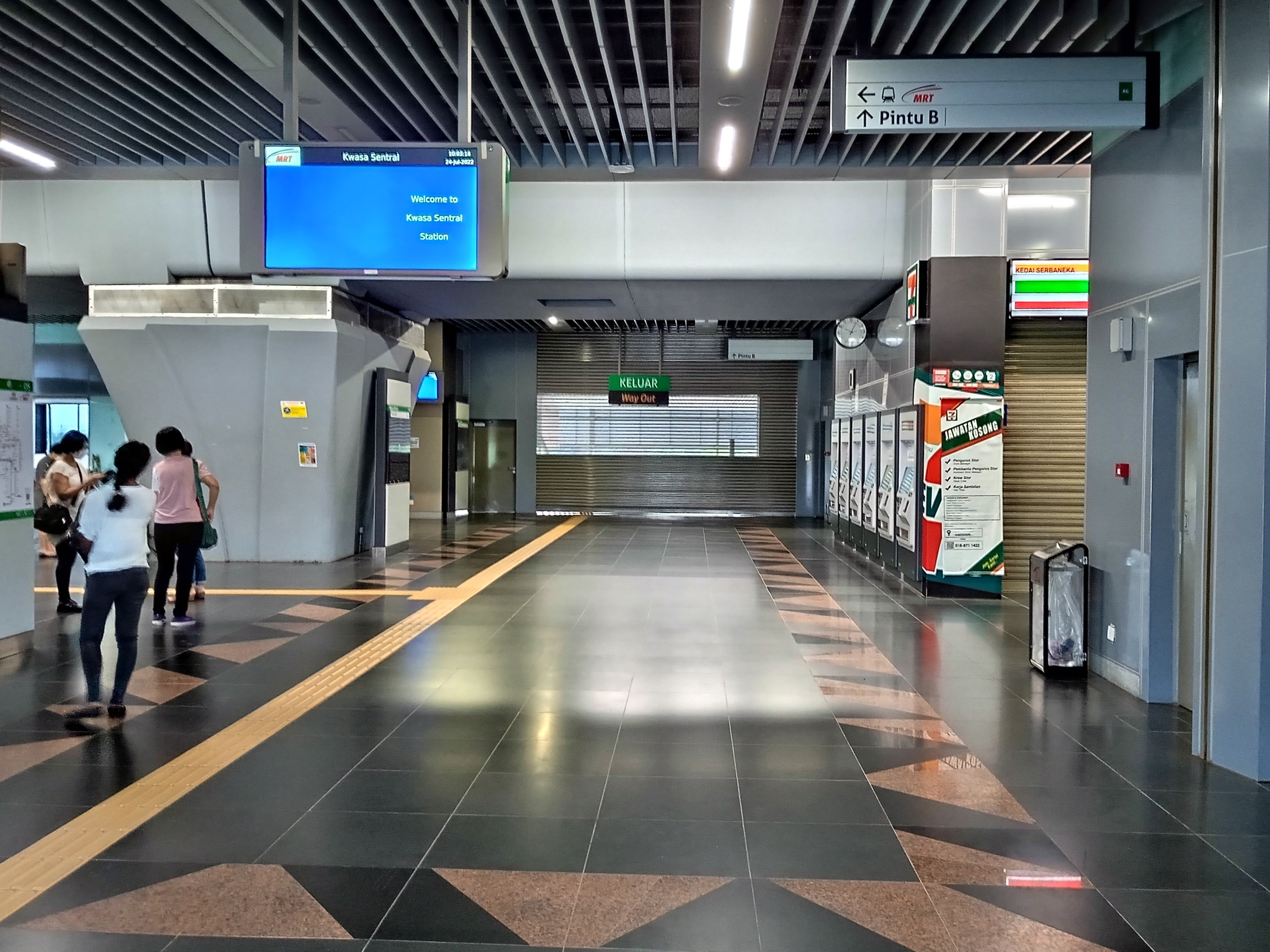
Station concourse

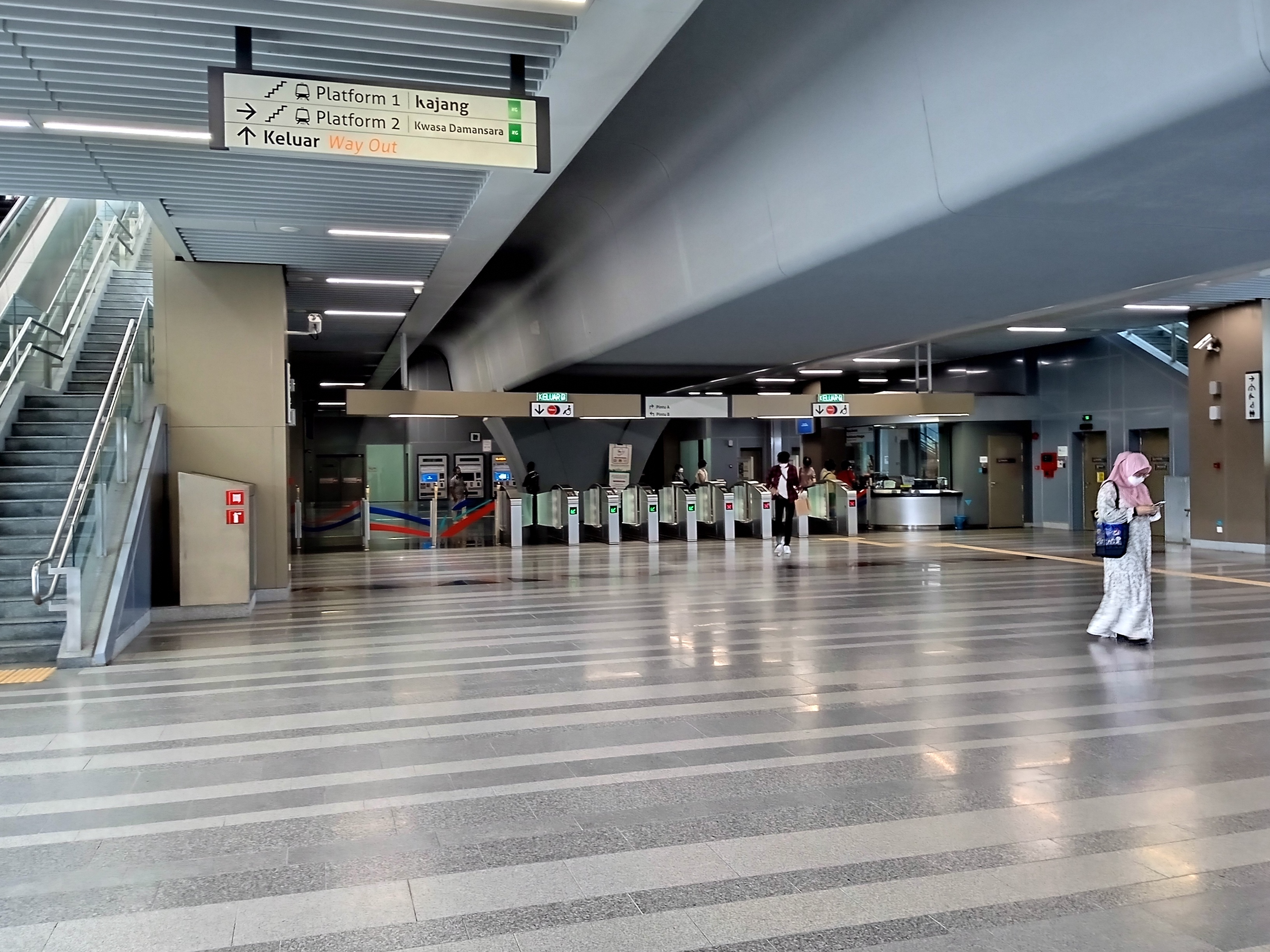
Paid zone of station concourse

The MRT station is an elevated station with the same standard elevated station design adopted by other stations on the Kajang Line. Attached to the station is a major feeder bus terminal and an at-grade park and ride facility.

=== Station location ===
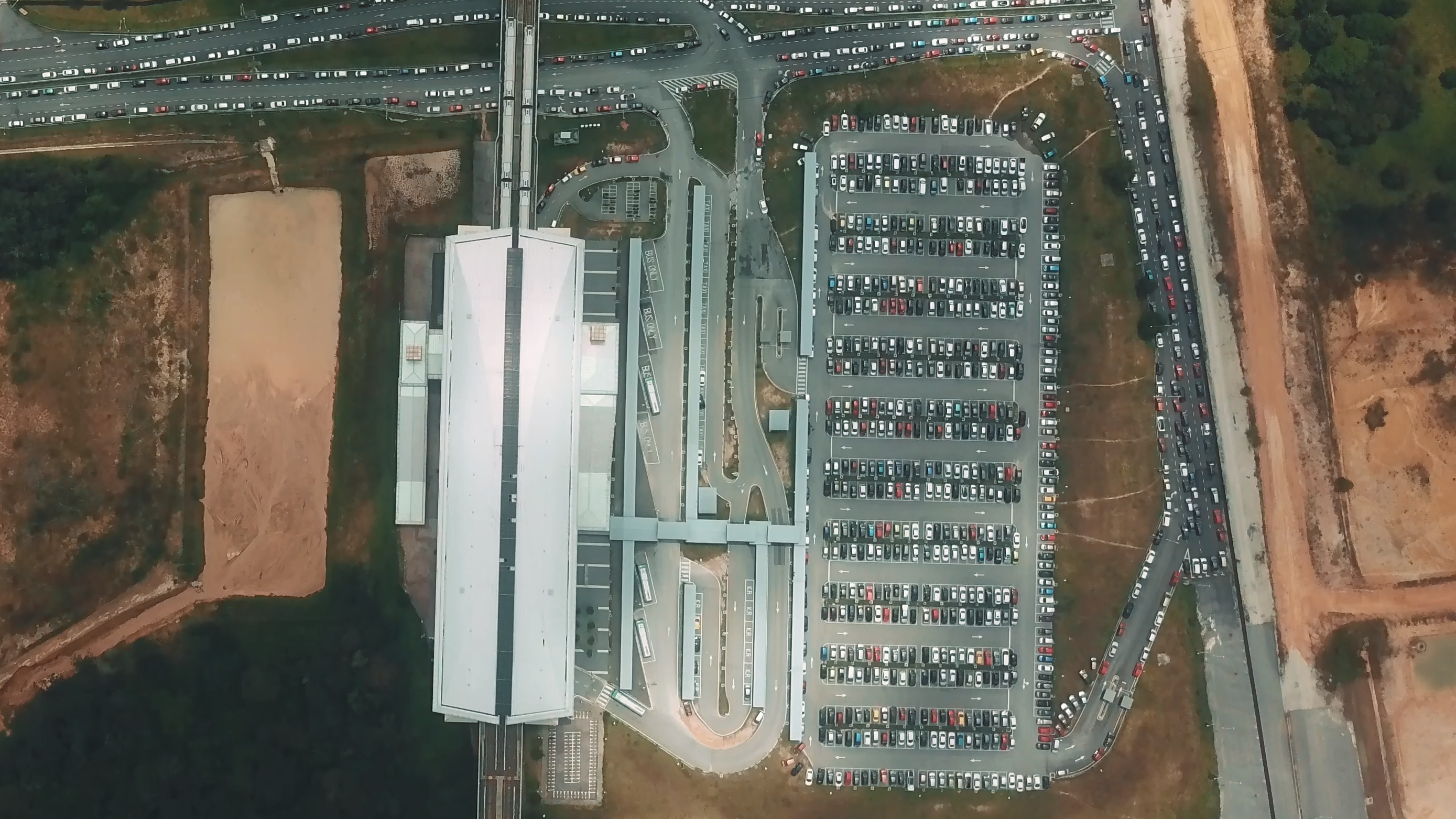
Aerial view of Kwasa Sentral station and its surroundings

The station is located within the future Kwasa Damansara development. It is one of two stations – the other being Kwasa Damansara – which were built to serve the development. Currently, other than the station and its park and ride facility, there are no other buildings in the station's vicinity.

As the station is located off Jalan Sungai Buloh, access to the station is provided via a newly constructed road leading from the Jalan Sungai Buloh-Persiaran Sungai Buloh intersection.

=== Station layout ===
L2	Platform Level	Side platform
L2	Platform Level	Platform 1: 9 Kajang Line towards KG35 Kajang (→)
L2	Platform Level	Platform 2: 9 Kajang Line towards KG04 Kwasa Damansara (←)
L2	Platform Level	Side platform
L1	Concourse	Faregates to paid area, escalators to platforms, ticketing machines, customer service office, station control, shops
G	Ground Level	Entrance A, Feeder Bus Terminal, Taxi Lay-By, Kiss and Ride Lay-By, Park and Ride, Staff Parking

=== Exits and entrances ===
The station is designed with two entrances - Entrance A and Entrance B - but currently, only Entrance A is in use, leading to the feeder bus stop, taxi lay-by, drop-off area and the park and ride facility. Entrance B is currently closed and will be opened when the area on the east side of the station is developed.

Kajang Line station
Entrance	Location	Destination	Picture
A	West side of the station	Feeder bus stop, taxi and private vehicle lay-by, park and ride	
B	East side of the station	Currently closed	

== History ==
During the early stages of construction before the finalisation of station names, Kwasa Sentral station was known by the working name Taman Industri Sungai Buloh.

== Feeder bus services ==
With the opening of the Kajang Line, feeder buses also began operating, linking the station with several housing areas in Kota Damansara and Subang (Sections U3 and U5, Shah Alam). The feeder buses operate from the station's feeder bus hub adjacent to the station.

Route No.	Origin	Destination	Via	Connecting to	Image
T801	KG05 Kwasa Sentral	Section 6, 7, 8 9, Kota Damansara	Persiaran Sungai Buloh; Persiaran Surian; Jalan Nuri 7 Jalan Pekaka 8/1; Persiaran Jati	780	
T802	KG05 Kwasa Sentral	Subang Bestari; Subang Suria	Jalan Sungai Buloh; Persiaran Angkasa; Persiaran Cakerawala; Jalan Utarid U5/3; Persiaran Atmosphera	772, T772, T803, T804	
T803	KG05 Kwasa Sentral	Subang Suria; Subang 2		772, T772, T802, T804	
T804	KG05 Kwasa Sentral station	Subang Perdana; Pekan Subang; Sultan Abdul Aziz Shah Airport; KS03 Terminal Skypark	Jalan Sungai Buloh; Jalan Subang Perdana; Jalan Lapangan Terbang Subang Lama	T773, T772, T802, T804	
T772	KG05 Kwasa Sentral	Bukit Subang	Sultan Abdul Aziz Shah Airport	772, T802, T803, T804	

== Gallery ==
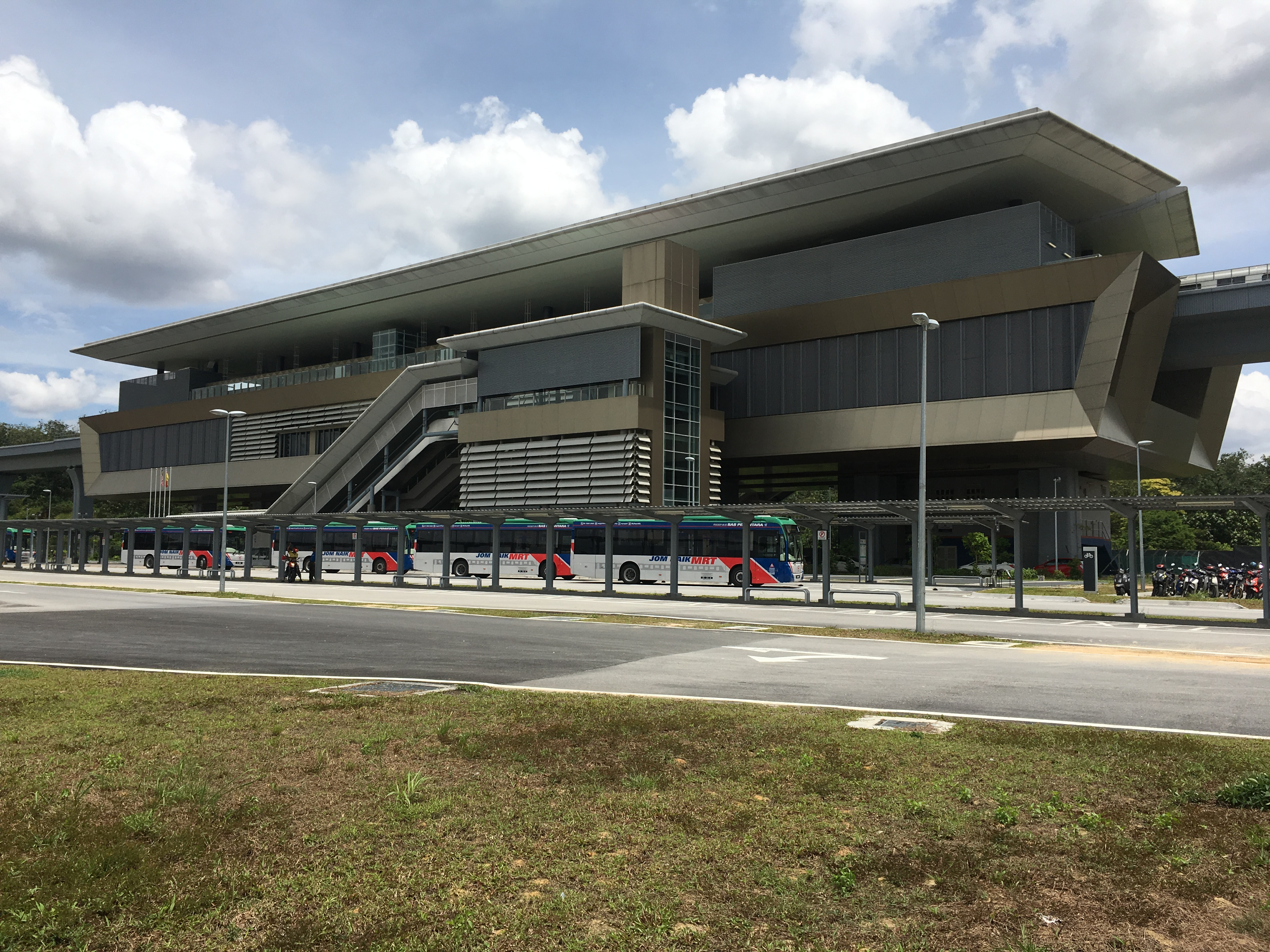
Overall view of the station

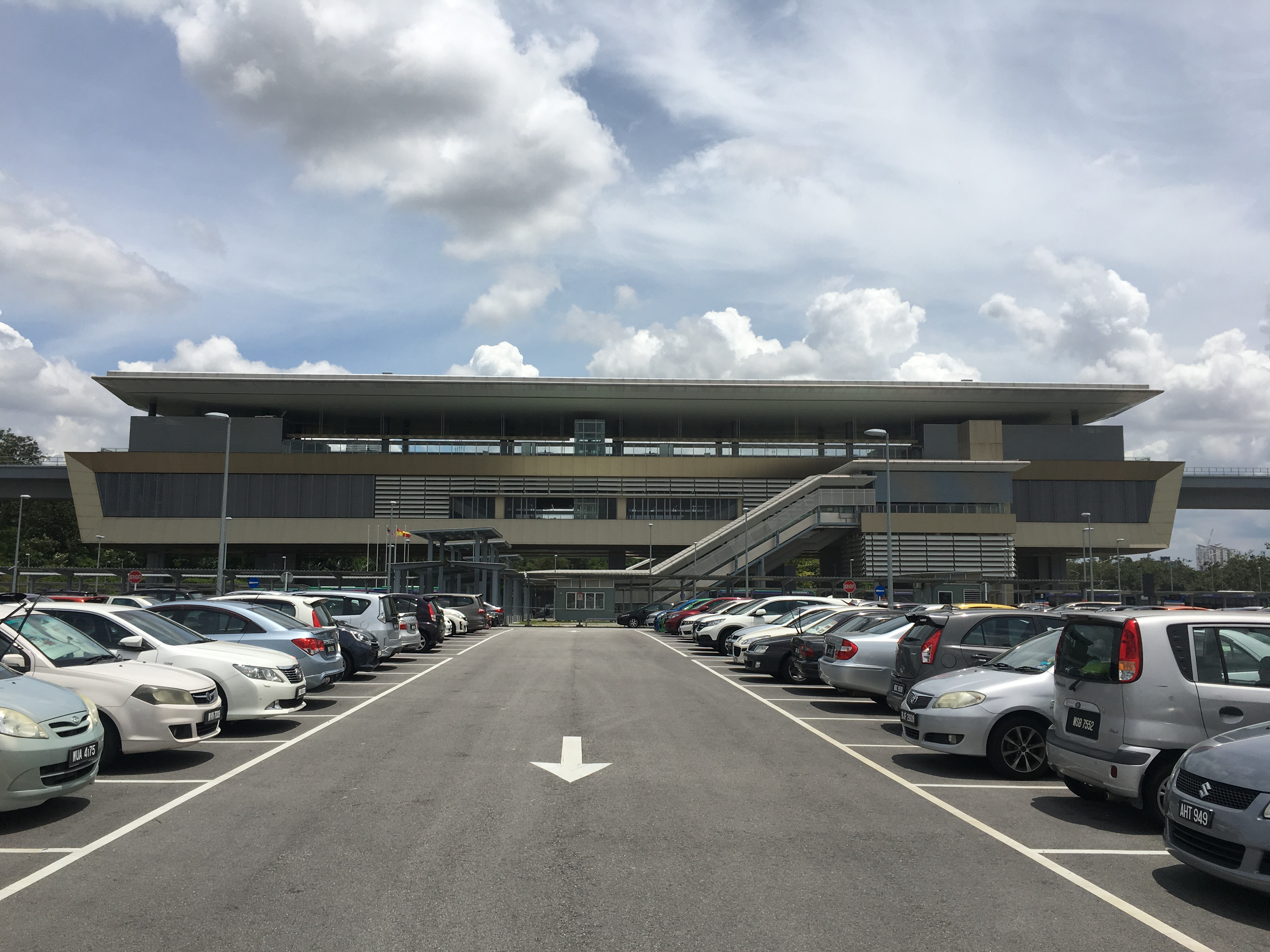
Station with its park-and-ride facility in the foreground

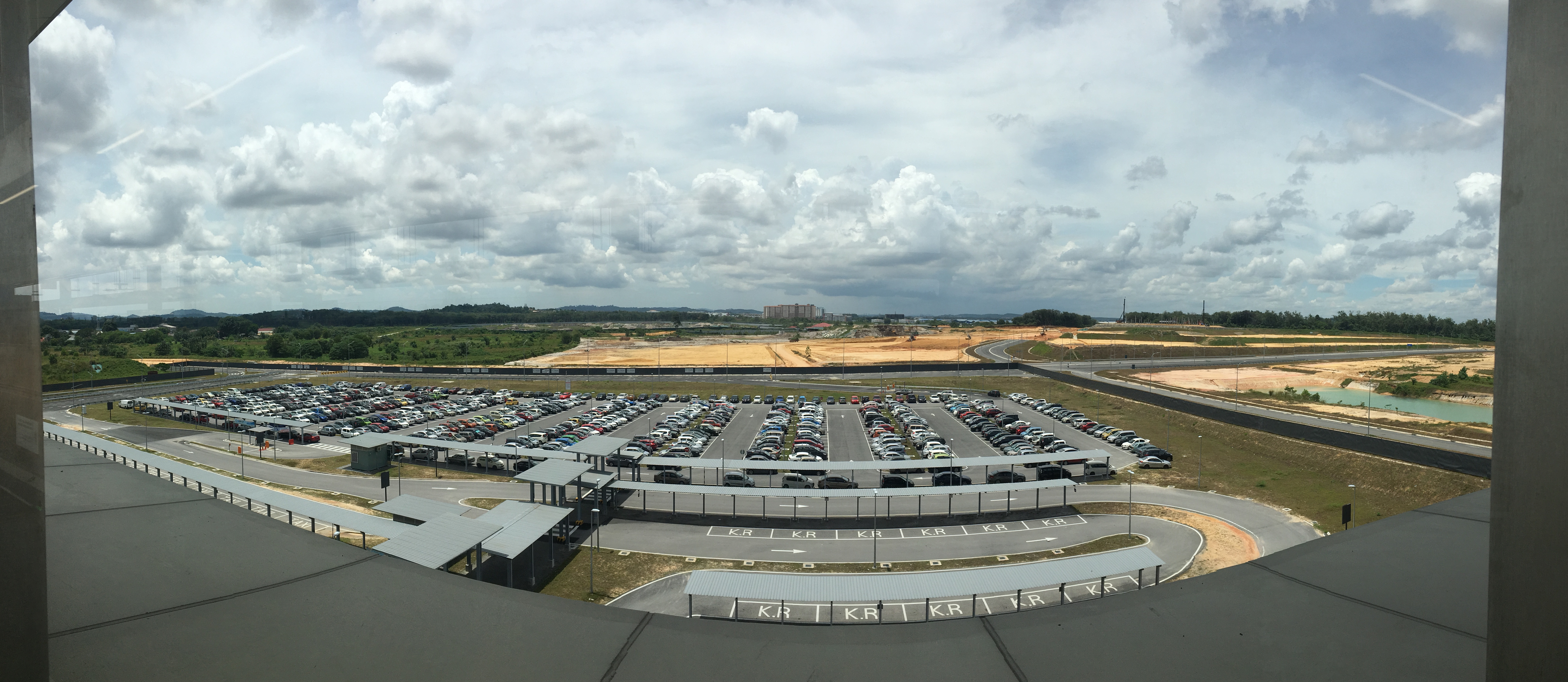
Panoramic view of the park-and-ride facility next to the station

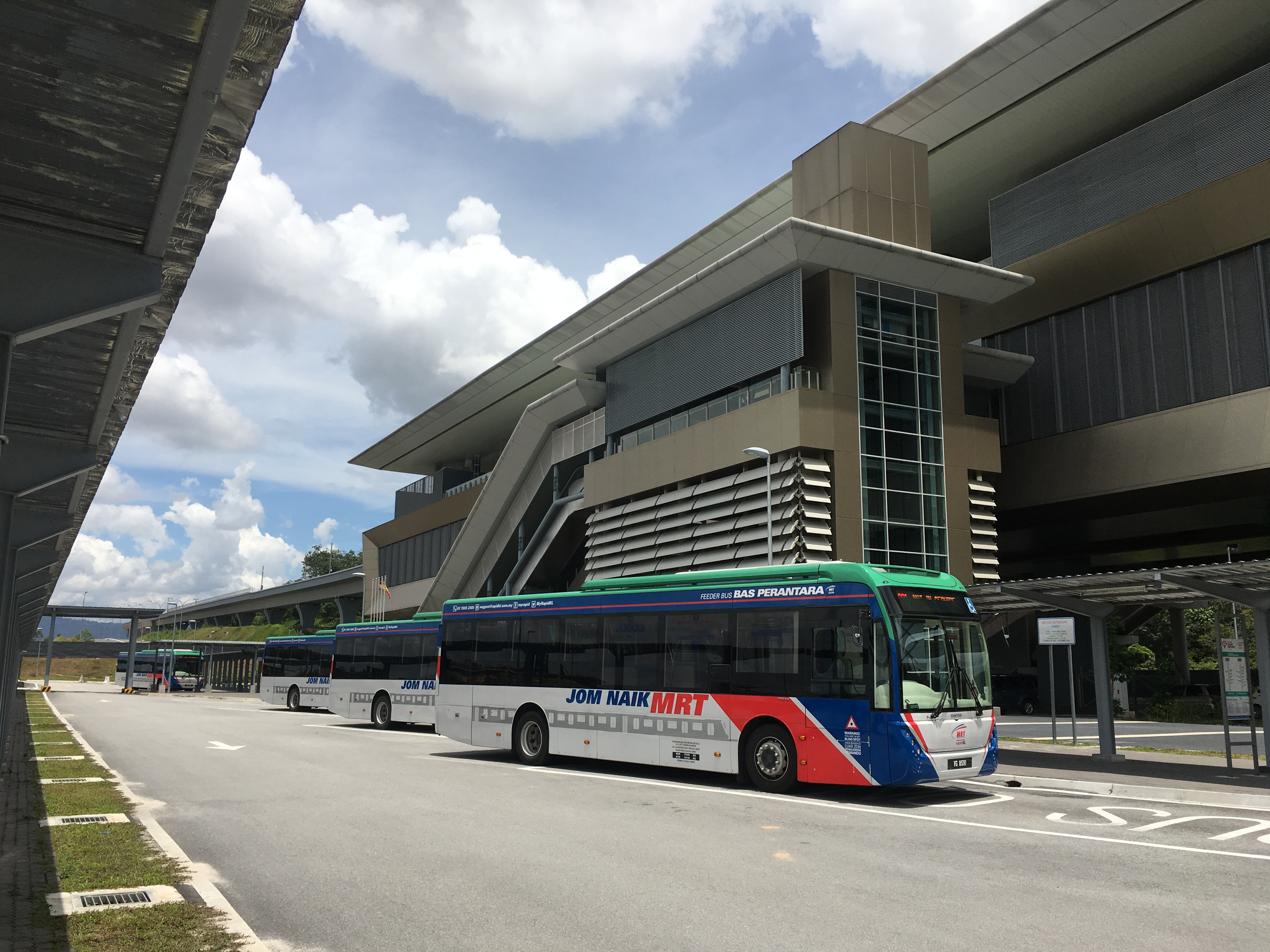
Feeder bus stop next to the station

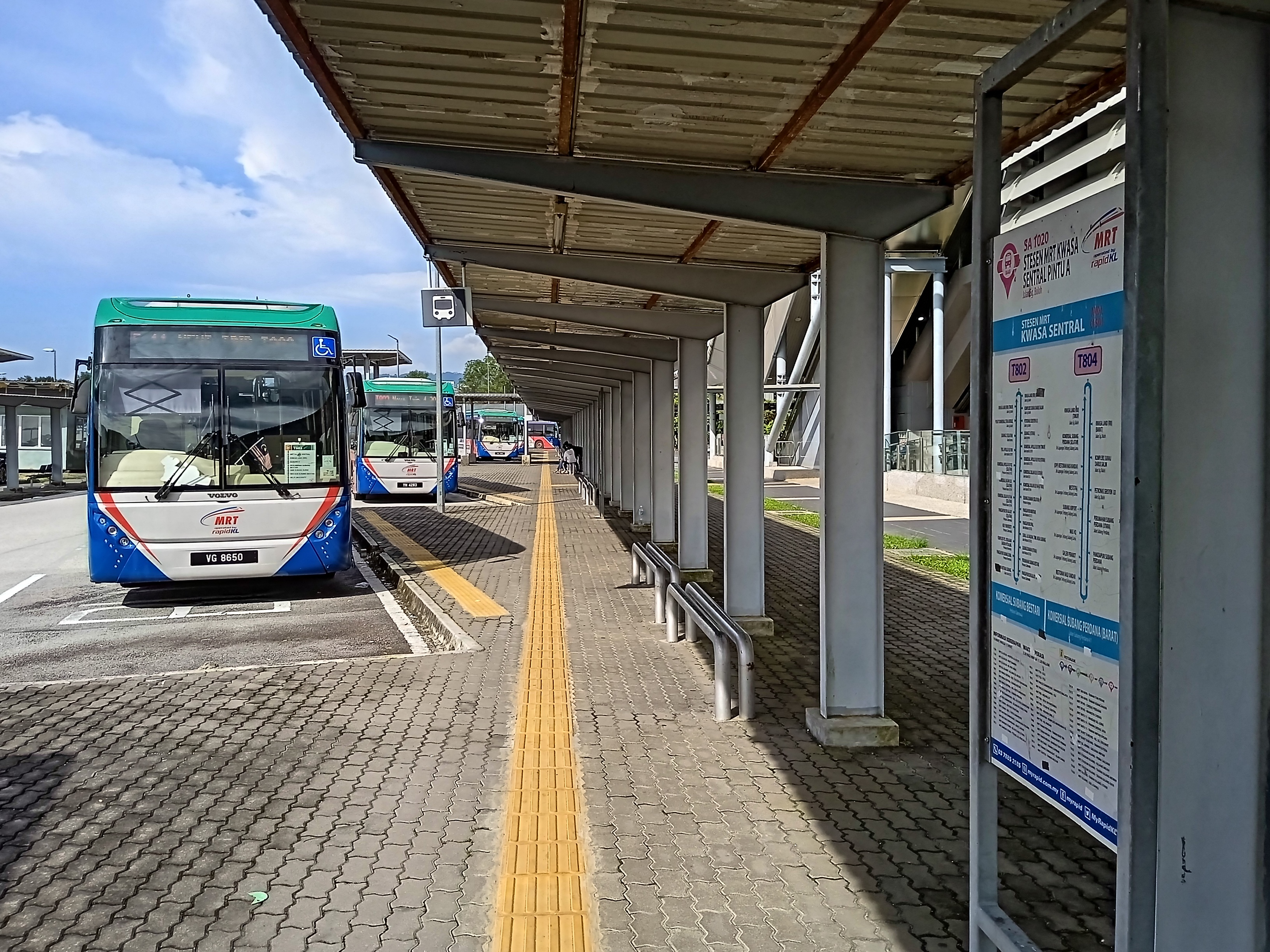
Feeder buses at the bus stop next to the station

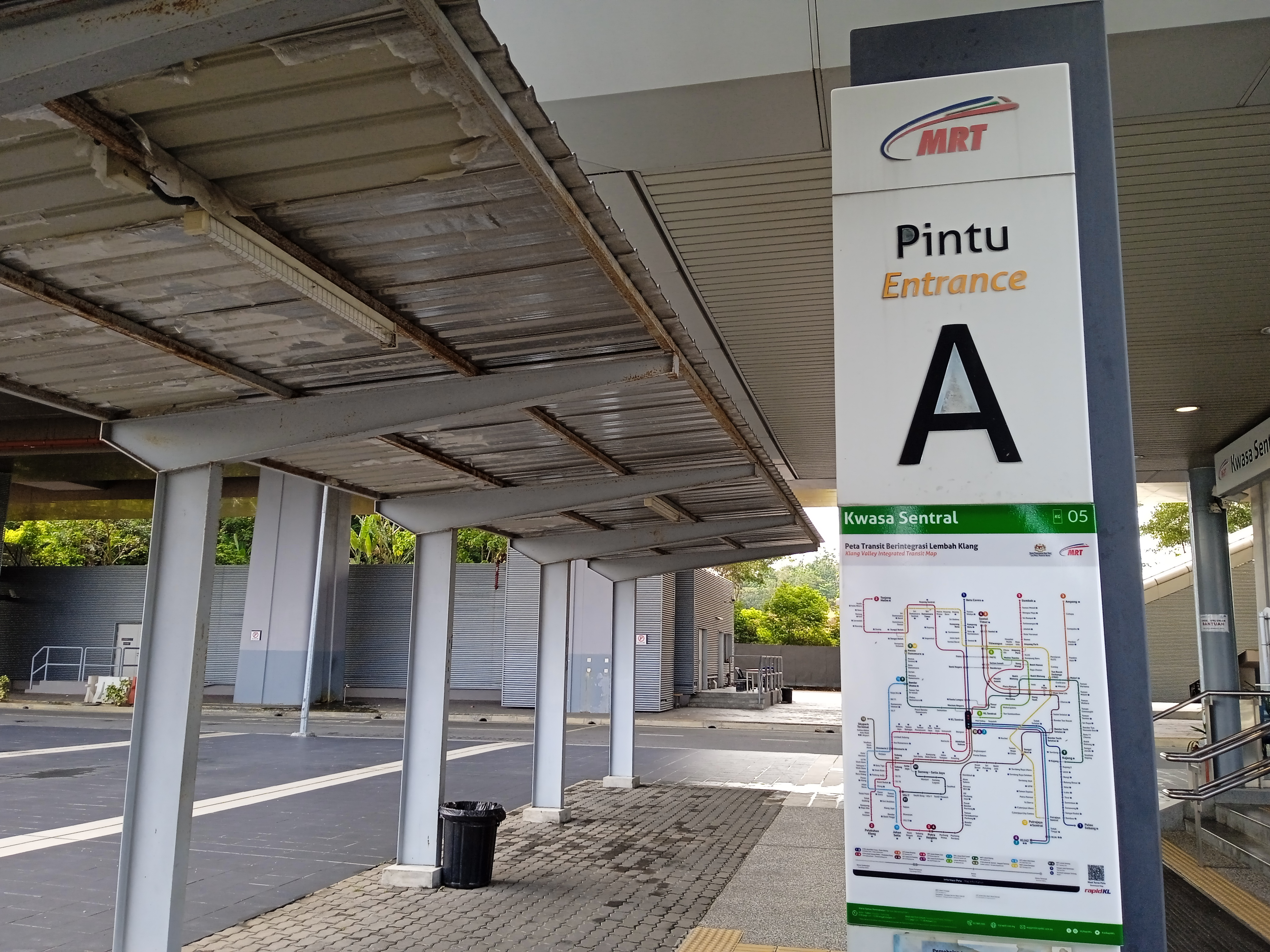
Entrance A of the station leading from the feeder bus stops

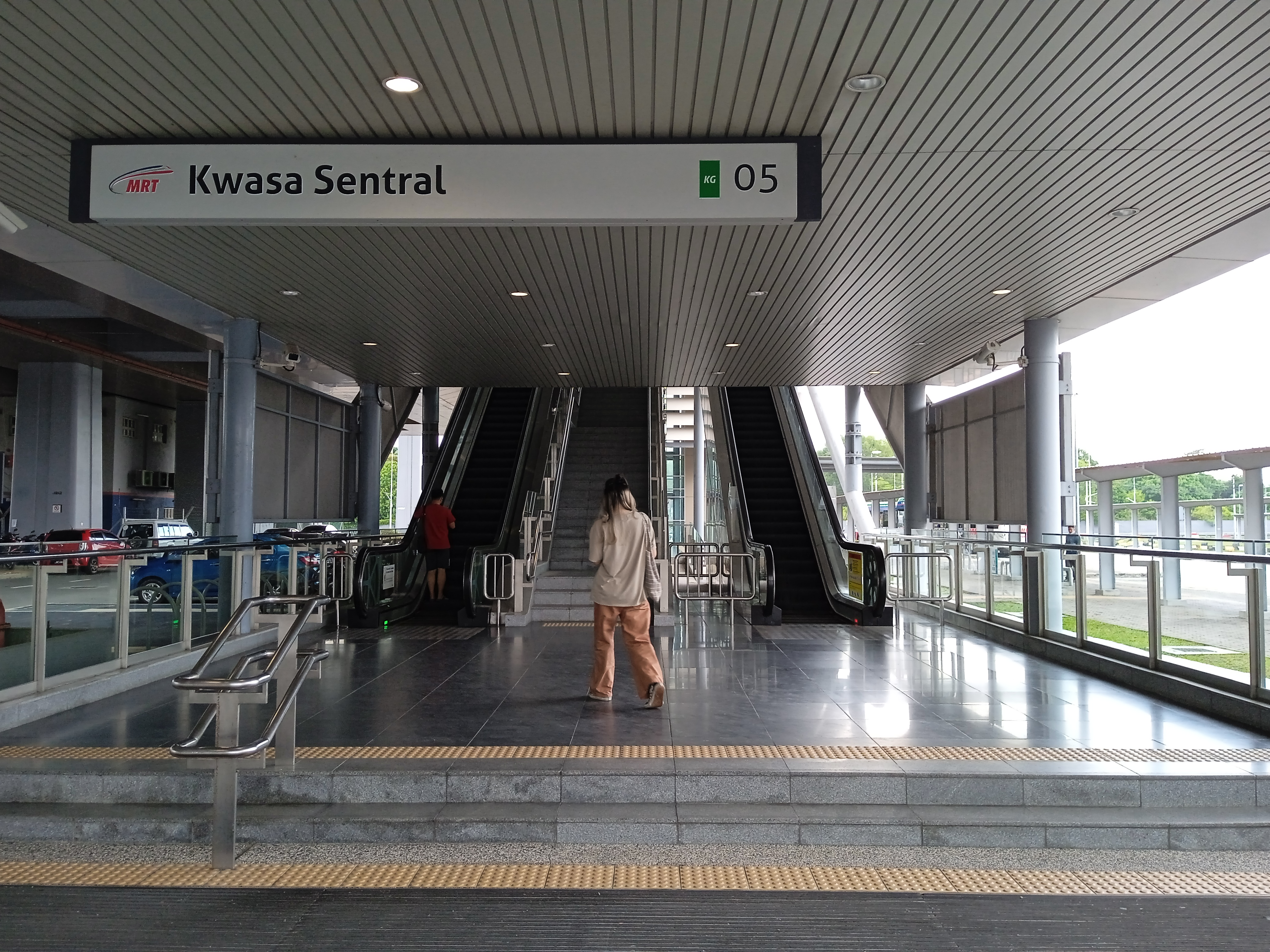
Entrance A of the station

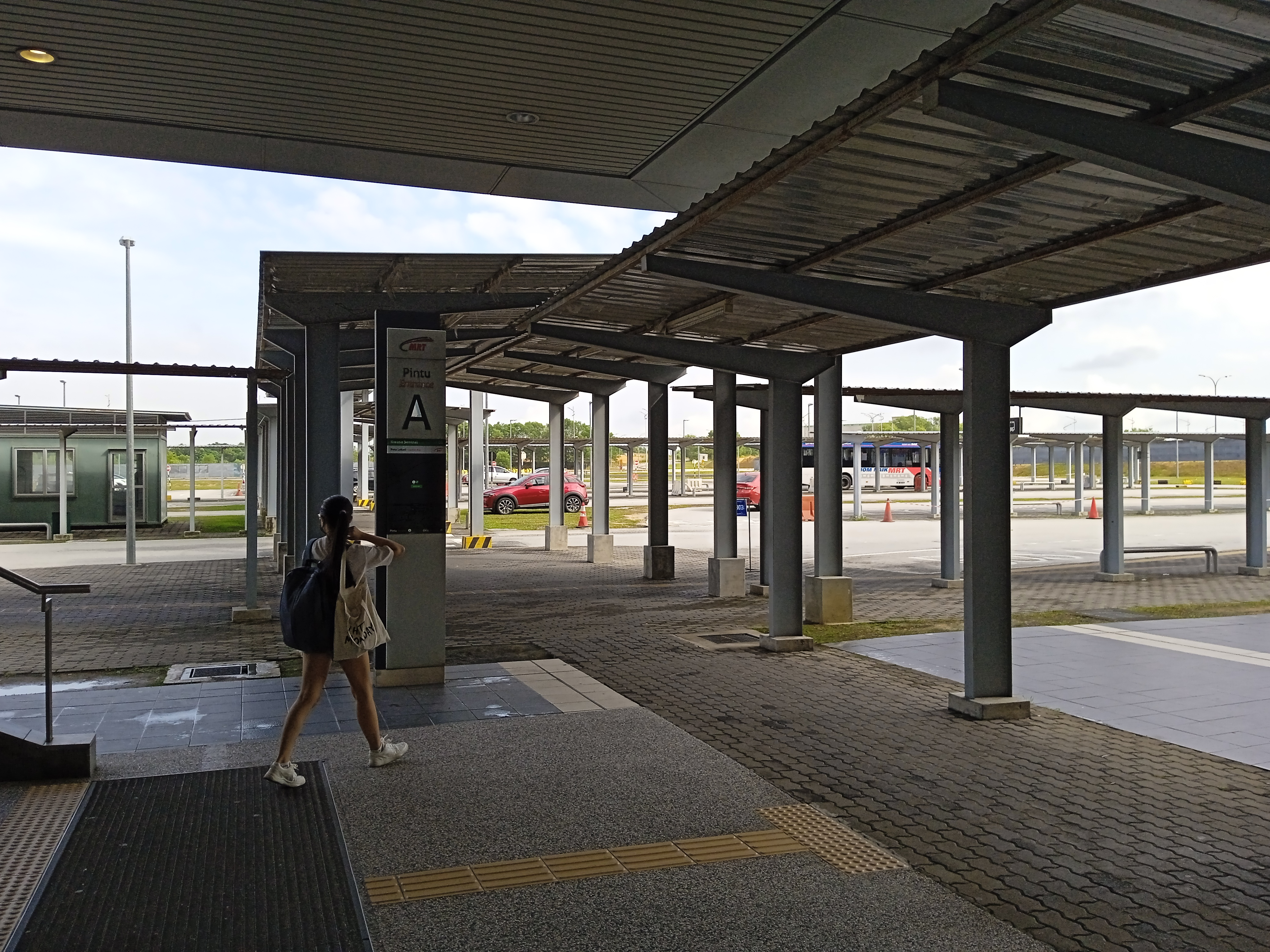
Entrance A and the walkway to the park and ride area at right

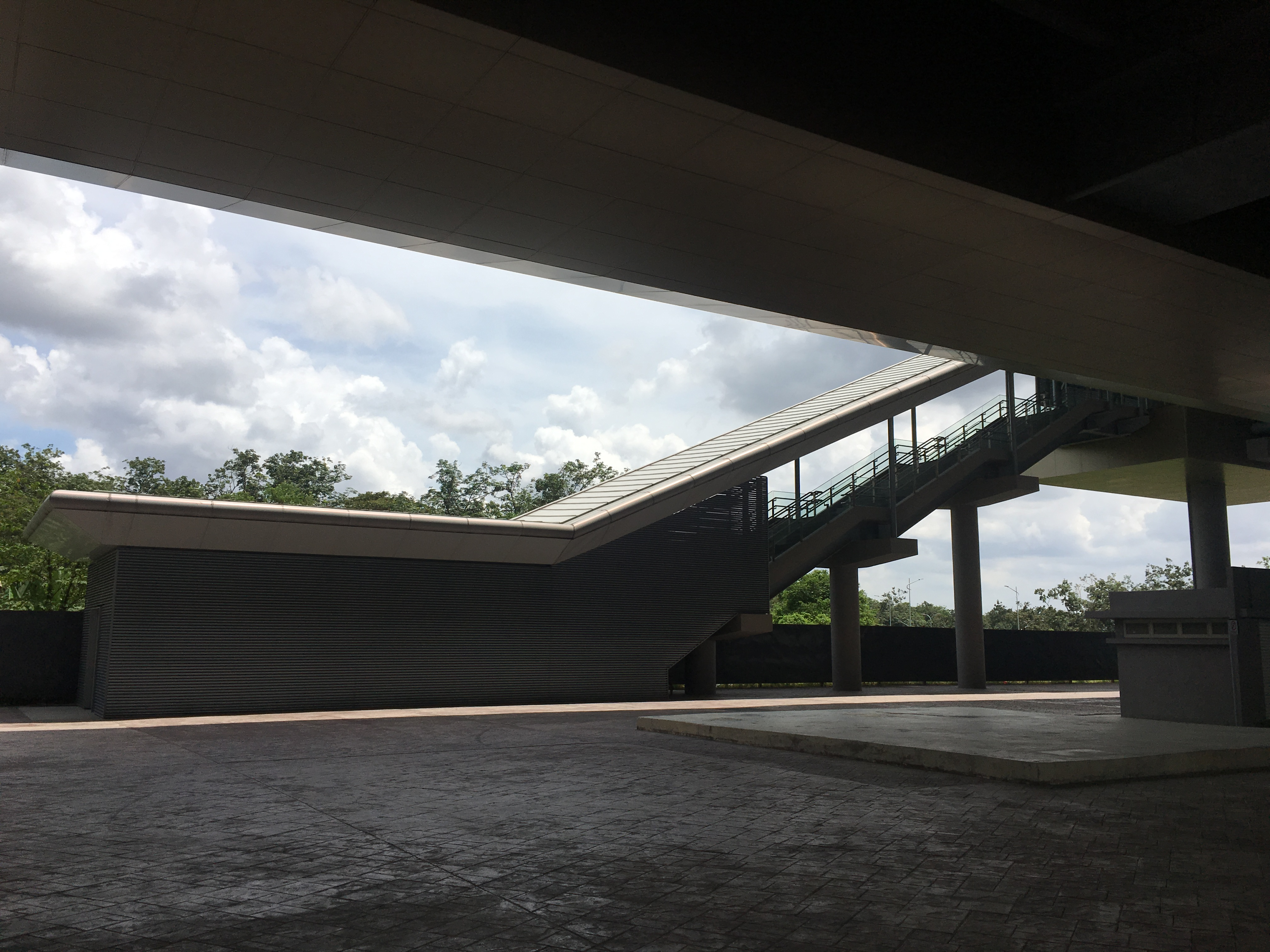
Unopened Entrance B

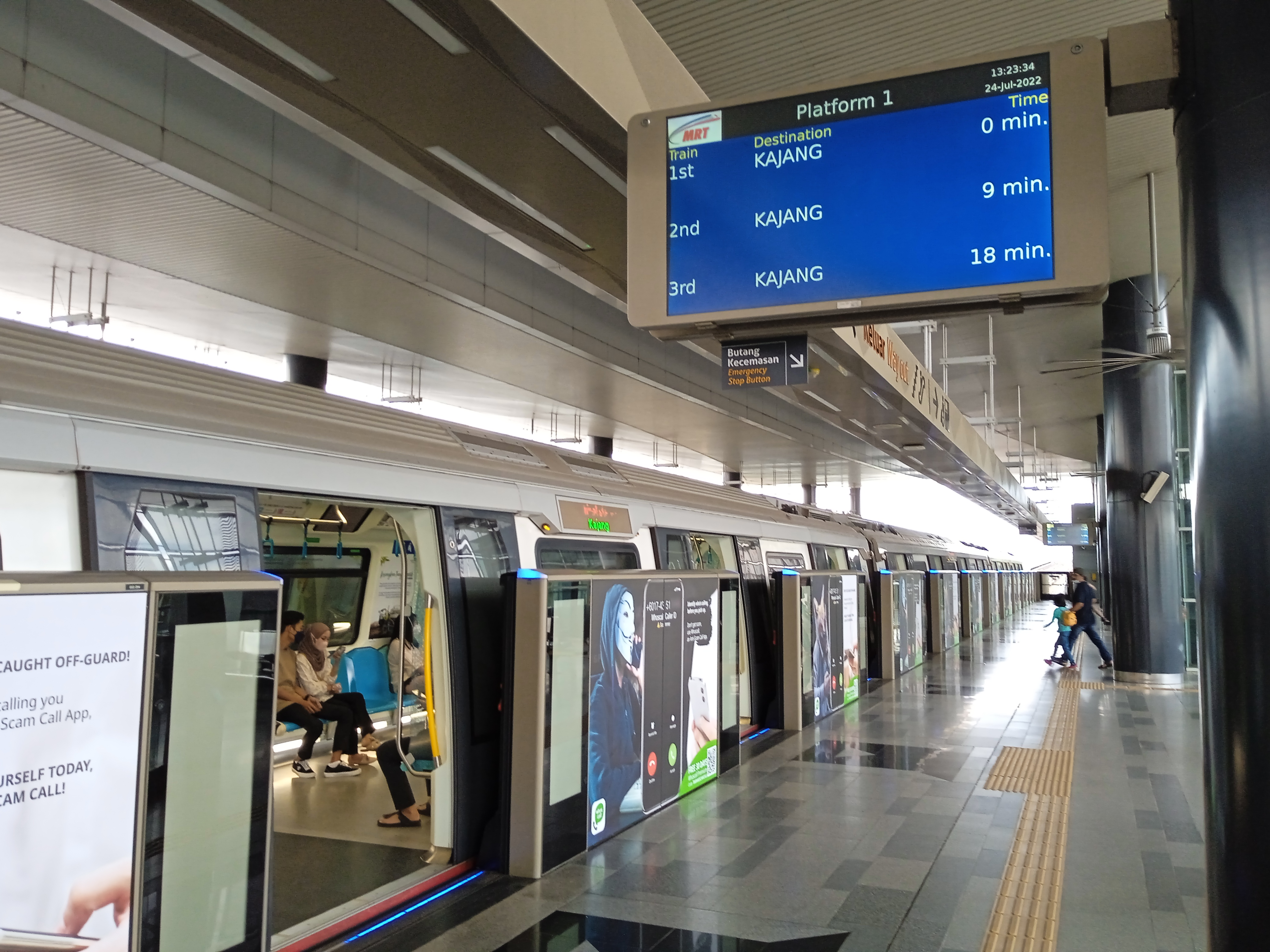
Platform 1 of the station towards Kajang

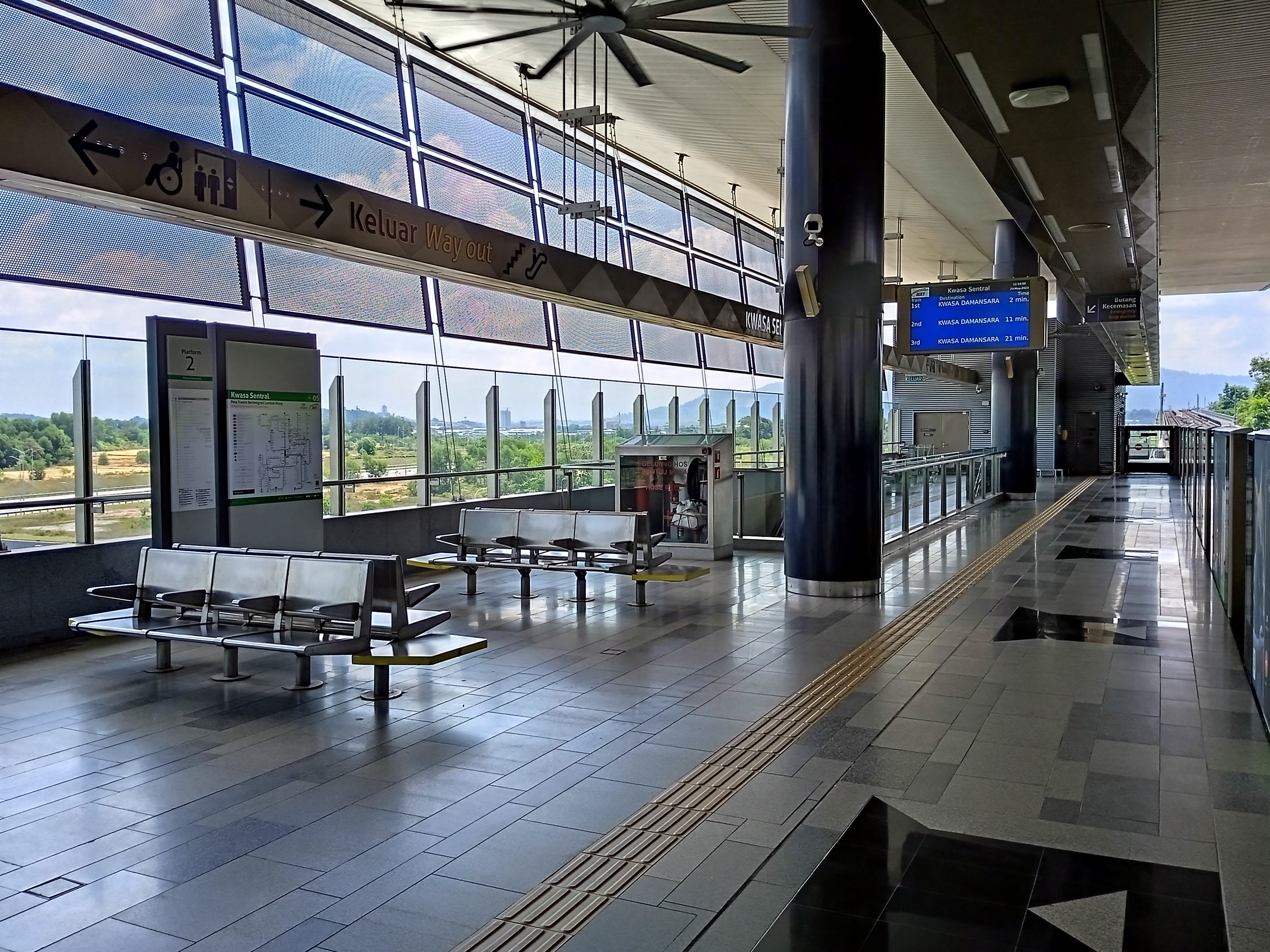
Platform 2 of the station towards Kwasa Damansara

== See also ==
- MRT Kajang line
- Kwasa Damansara
