= The Exchange TRX =

Shopping mall in Kuala Lumpur, Malaysia

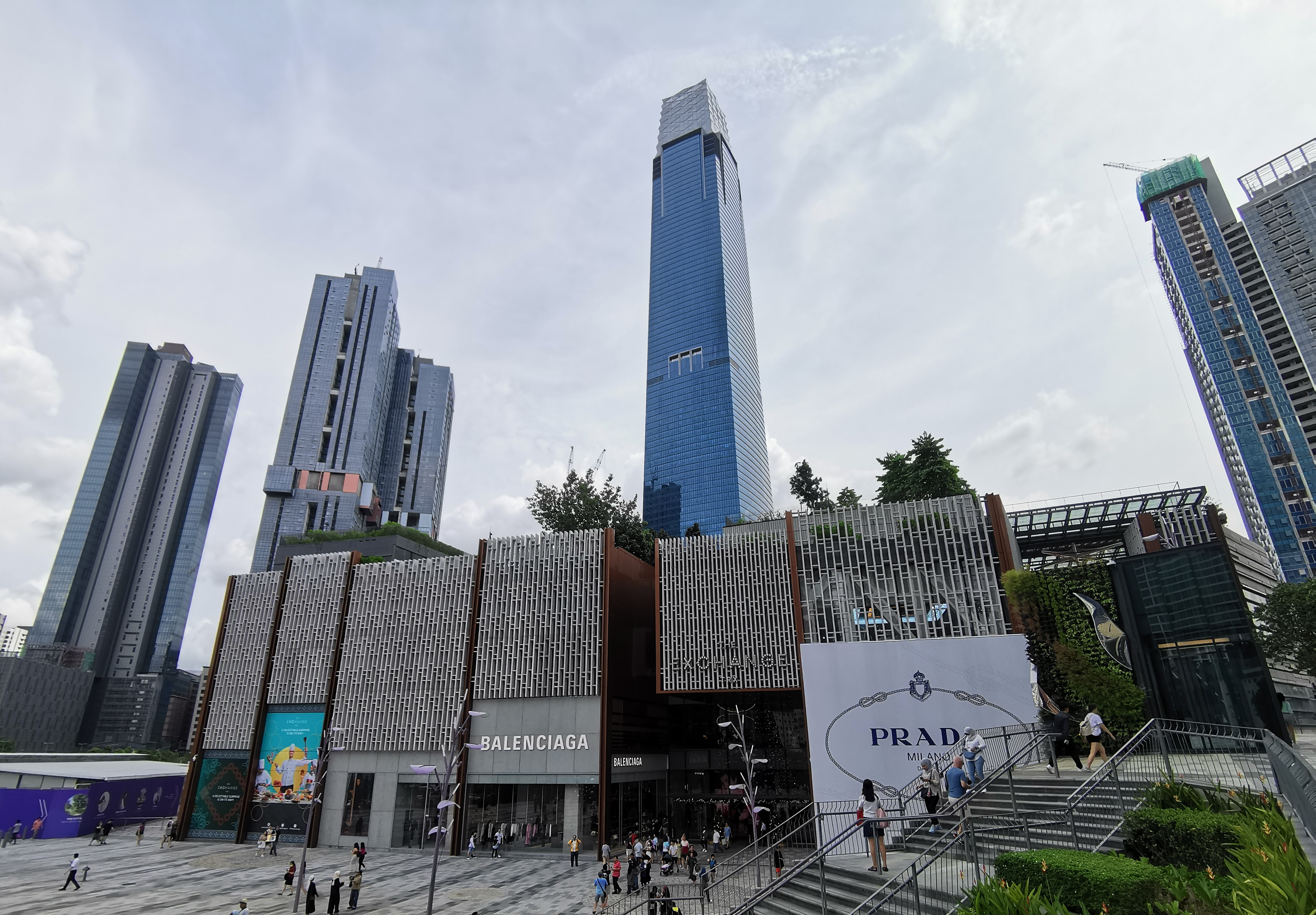
- Mall facade from the Raintree Plaza
- Location: Tun Razak Exchange, Kuala Lumpur, Malaysia
- Coordinates: 3.14264°N 101.71795°E
- Address: Persiaran TRX, Tun Razak Exchange, 55188 Kuala Lumpur
- Opened: 29 November 2023; 2 years ago
- Previous names: TRX Lifestyle Quarter
- Developer: Lendlease Development Malaysia Sdn Bhd
- Owner: LQ Retail Sdn Bhd (joint venture between Lendlease and TRX)
- Num. of stores: 400+
- Num. of anchor tenants: 4 (Aurum Theatre, Seibu, Mercato, Apple)
- Floor area: 1,300,000 sq ft (120,000 m^{2})
- Floors: 5
- Parking: 3 levels
- Public transit: KG20 PY23 Tun Razak Exchange MRT Station
- Website: www.theexchangetrx.com

The Exchange TRX, also known as the TRX Mall and officially known as Plaza The Exchange TRX, is a shopping mall and complex situated next to the Bukit Bintang shopping district in Kuala Lumpur, Malaysia. It is located off Jalan Tun Razak to the east and Jalan Kampung Pandan to the south. The term "TRX" in its name is a short form of Tun Razak Exchange, the area where the mall was developed at. As part of the TRX Lifestyle Quarter precinct, the development also includes a hotel block by Kimpton Hotels & Restaurants and an office block built on top of the mall as well as 6 residential towers right next to it. The Exchange TRX constitutes as one of the first stages in the development of the Tun Razak Exchange district, making it as a primary highlight for the area.

It is currently anchored by Apple, Seibu Department Store, Golden Screen Cinemas' Aurum Theatre and Mercato Supermarket (previously a supermarket under Dairy Farm Group of Hong Kong, now sold to Malaysian company Macrovalue Sdn Bhd in 2023). There are also other smaller scaled anchor tenants such as H&M, Uniqlo, LC Waikiki, Muji and MPH Bookstores.

== Overview ==
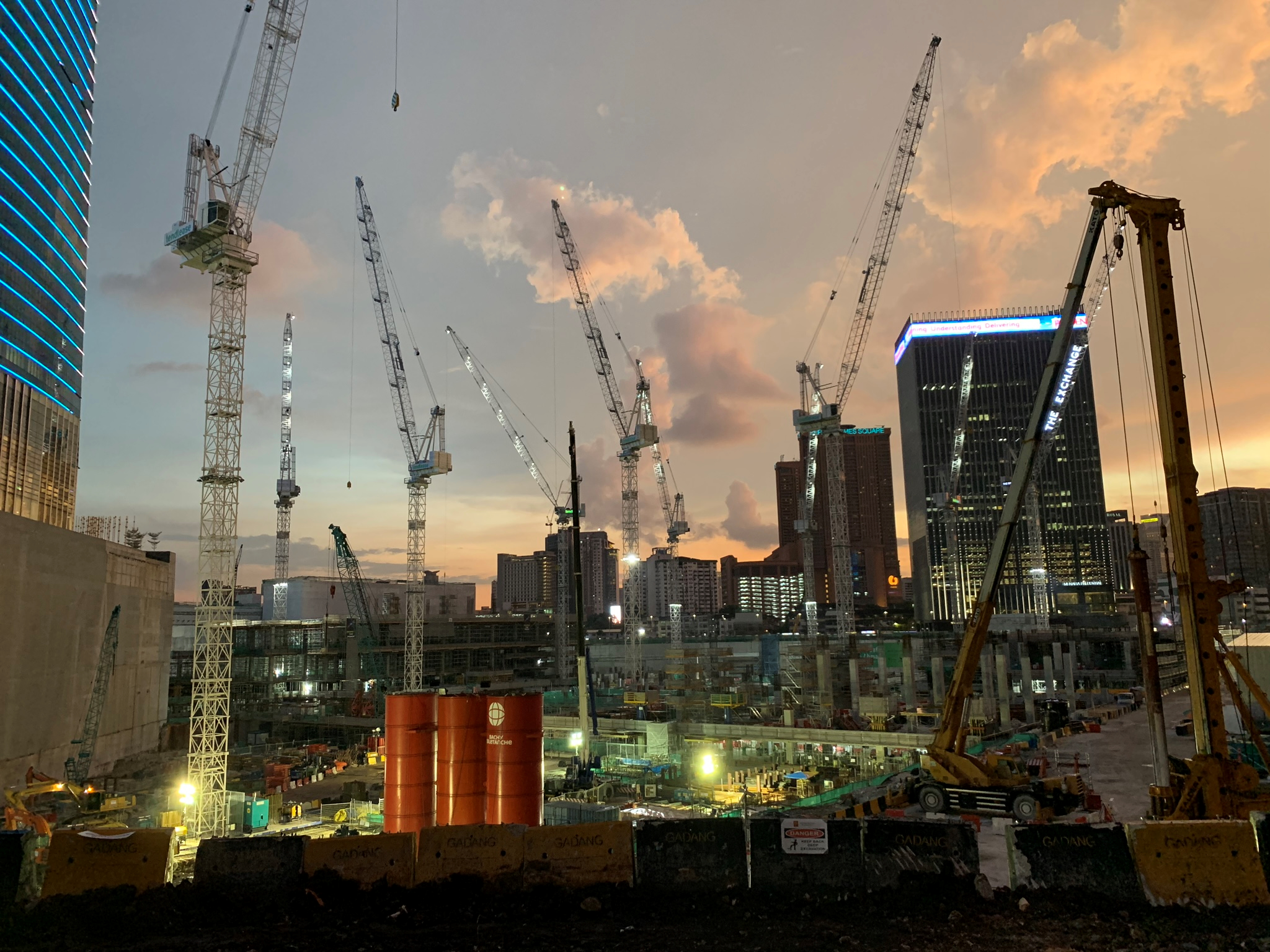
Construction of the complex in May 2019

The mall was built through a partnership and collaboration deal between Australian-based developer Lendlease (Lendlease Development Malaysia Sdn Bhd) and the main developer of the district (TRX City Sdn Bhd), in which the former had owned 60% of the development and the remaining by the latter of which is a subsidiary wholly owned by the Finance Ministry and under the Malaysian government's purview. TRX City Sdn Bhd prior to that was previously known as 1MDB Real Estate Sdn Bhd which was a subsidiary company of the infamous 1Malaysia Development Berhad (1MDB). The development was first known as TRX Lifestyle Quarter, hence the company named LQ Retail Sdn Bhd, a joint venture company between Lendlease and TRX City Sdn Bhd. Taking up 17-acre of space in the district, the development was proposed to include a retail mall alongside hotels, offices, residential condominiums and a park, subsequently forming as the center of the overall TRX master plan. Construction of the mall began in 2017 and was opened to the public on 29 November 2023 along with the operation of the district's underground tunnels in conjunction with TRX's big opening. The Exchange TRX was expected to be completed by third quarter of 2021 but was further delayed due to unfinished construction caused by the strict Movement Control Order (MCO) in the country from the COVID-19 pandemic.

There are more than 400 retailers and eateries, that includes the anchor tenants, spanning across 4 floors of the mall. Many of the retail stores are mid-to-high-end with designer brands occupying the ground level, while the floor below it are taken up by common retailers, restaurants, supermarkets and a food court. The mall contains attractions for children and young adults, with a space for playgrounds on top of the building. A multitude of events take place at the Central Exchange which is the mall's main center. Throughout the year, this space undergoes changes according to seasonal celebrations and can be turned into a stage for special functions, including performances. The mall gets adorned with decorations during the holiday periods.

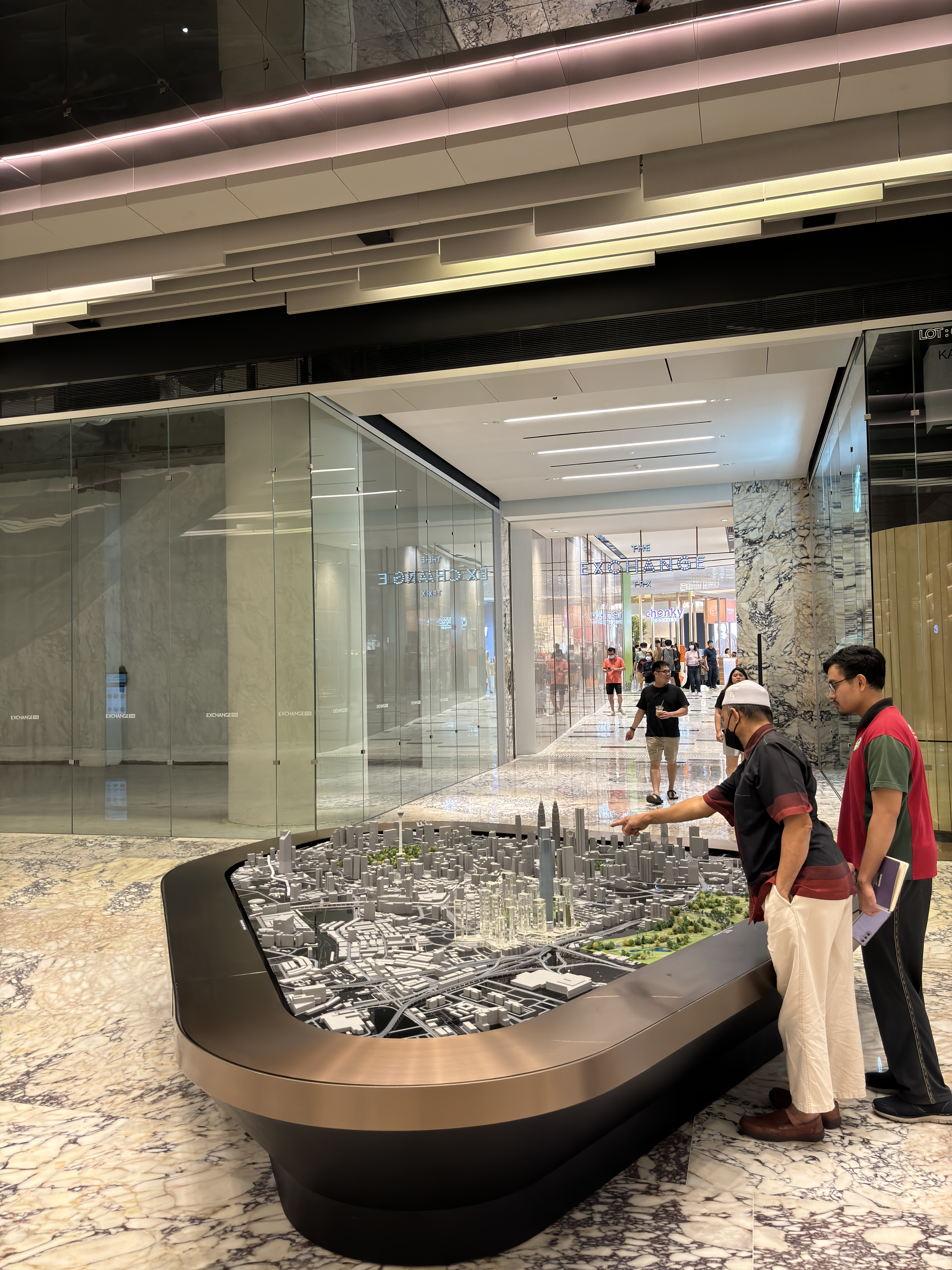
106 Connection at Level 1 of the mall and Level G of the tower.

In June 2022, Lendlease had forged a partnership with The Exchange 106 to integrate the mall with its retail lots consisting of two levels which is situated at the foot of the building. The integration of the retail podium forms as the first phase of The Exchange TRX that has a total of 70 units. There is a linked pathway in between the complex and the retail podium called "106 Connection" where it is located at Level 1 and Level 2 of the mall.

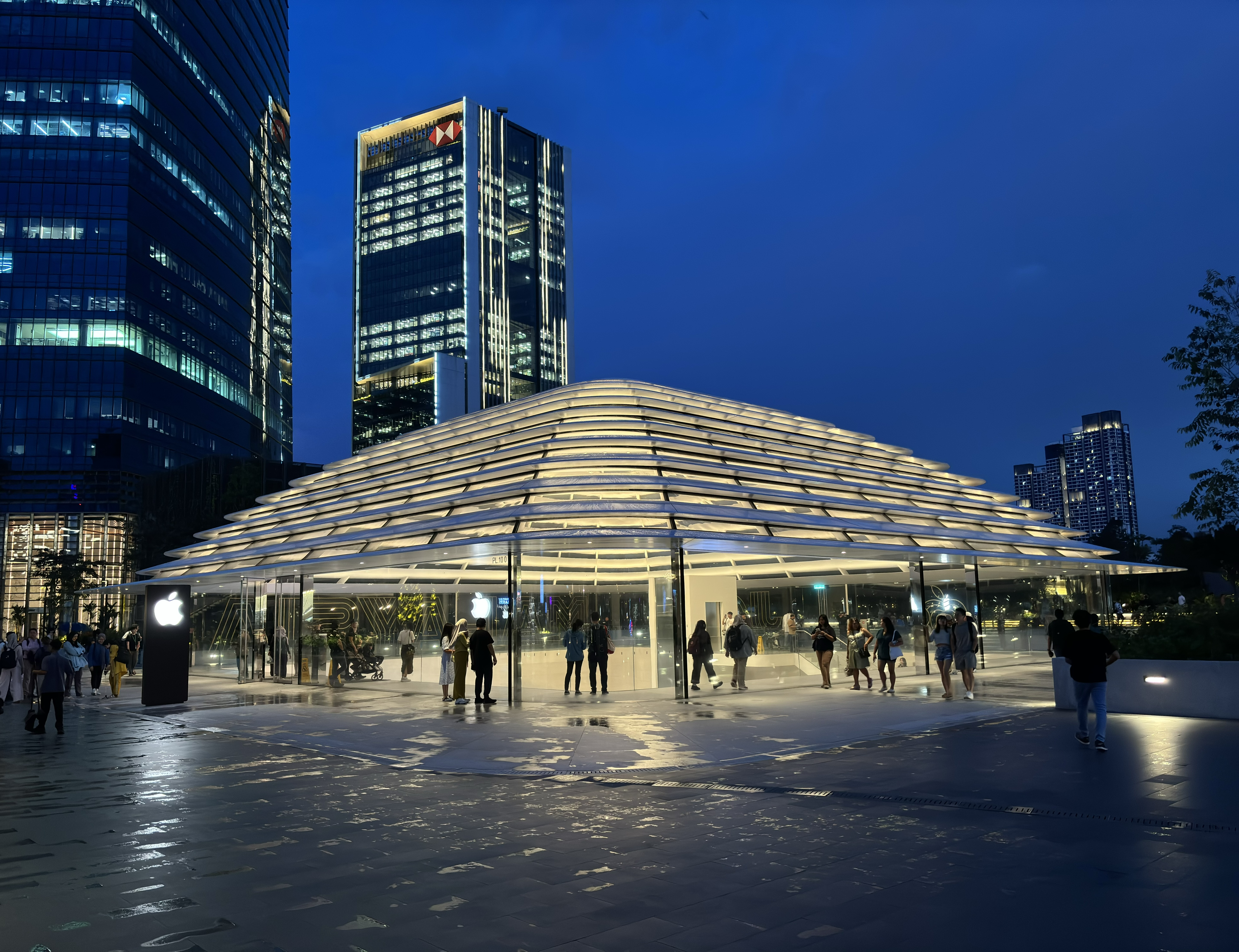
Apple The Exchange TRX from the mall's rooftop

Some notable brands and retailers at the mall that have made their debut in Malaysia are Salomon, Descente, Fred, La Prairie, Drunk Elephant, Gentle Monster, Maison Kitsuné, Cafe Kitsuné, Alo Yoga, Guerlain boutique, Dolce & Gabbana, Chaumet, Golden Goose, HeyTea, Reborn Coffee, Ben's Cookies, Naixue, Yogiyo, Ticco, Mil Toast House, Molton Brown, Tipsy Flamingo, Läderach and more. The mall houses Malaysia's first Apple Store which was opened on 22 June 2024 and occupying three levels within the mall, including a rooftop entrance. It is Apple's sixth store in Southeast Asia after Singapore and Thailand. Previously, there were reports where Lendlease was in discussions with Apple Inc. to open its retail store in Malaysia at The Exchange TRX.

== Rooftop park ==
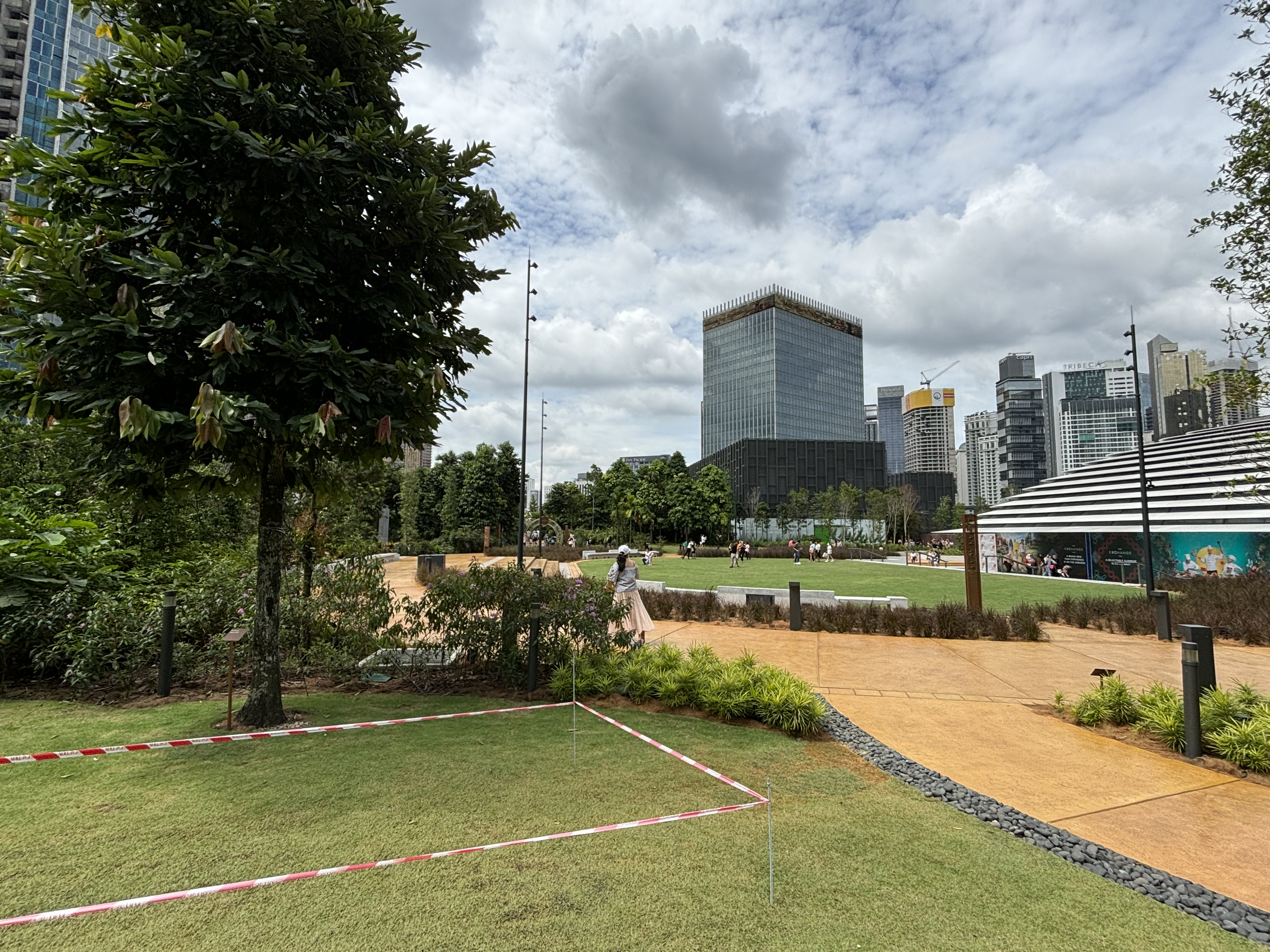
View of the TRX City Park

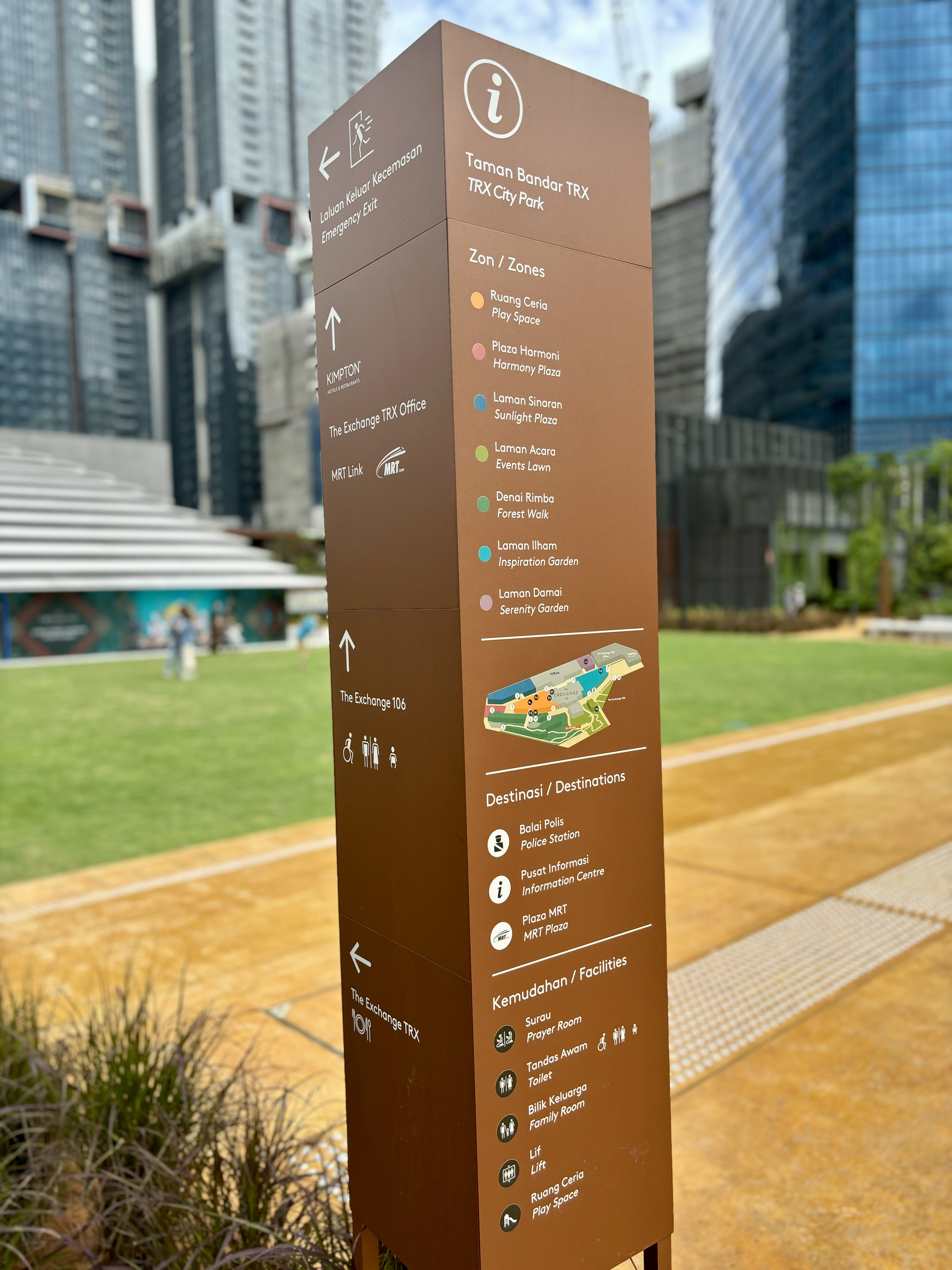
A directory map of the park

Other than being an ordinary shopping mall, it has a man made park that sits right above of the complex. Styled as TRX City Park or Taman Bandar TRX in Malay, it is a 10-acre park located on Level 3 of the mall, with open spaces and mini gardens scattered around it. The Kuala Lumpur City Hall (DBKL) currently owns the park while TRX will undertake the management, operation and maintenance of it.

There is a children playground, cave and water play features located at the park's Play City zone, while on the other side of the zone is a pond with weeds and gardens. The park also comes with a few open-air spaces such as the Events Lawn and Sunlight Plaza that play host to future events.

The park includes a number of F&B establishments with American-based fast food chain Shake Shack and Japanese coffee chain % Arabica Roastery opening their first outlet in Malaysia at the mall's rooftop park.

== Mall features ==
=== Dining precincts ===
- Food Exchange, the food court operated and managed by the mall at level concourse
- Dining Terrace, strip of restaurants and bars with glass roofs above the precinct
- Concourse Dining, housing restaurants of international and Asian cuisines at level concourse
- Premium Dining, rows of fine dining restaurants at first floor
- Park Dining, garden-inspired dining concepts at the rooftop level

=== Other precincts ===
- Beauty Galleria, an alley of cosmetic and beauty care brands on the ground floor.
- Central Exchange, the mall's main atrium
- City Avenue, northern section of the mall
- Park Avenue, southern section of the mall
- Urban Node, the mall's east atrium
- Market Lane, an outdoor pedestrian street with artisan shops and al-fresco restaurants

=== Park zoning ===
- Events Lawn
- Forest Walk
- Harmony Plaza
- Inspiration Garden
- Play City
- Serenity Garden
- Sunlight Plaza

== Accessibility ==
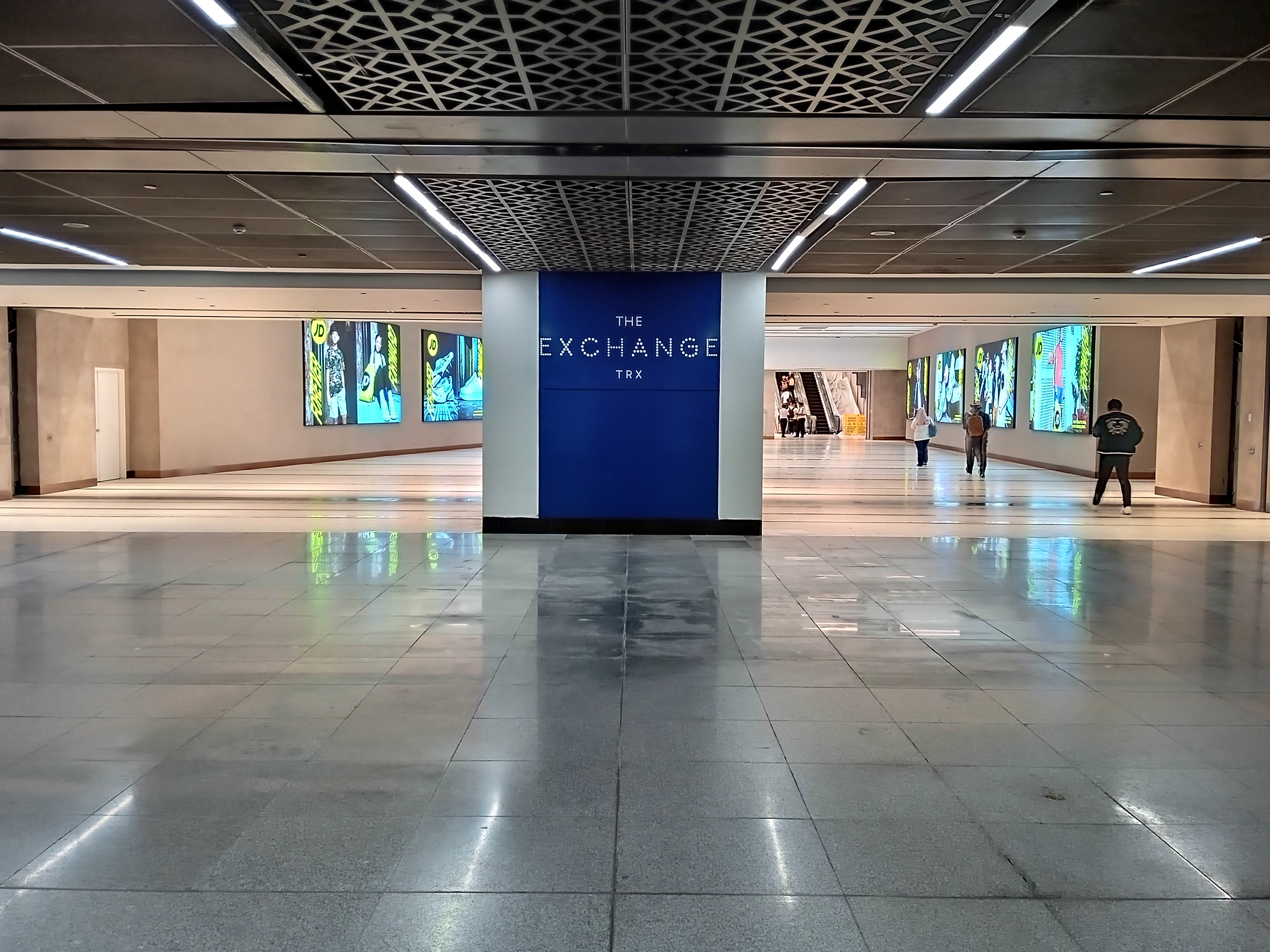
Underground linkway between The Exchange TRX and the Tun Razak Exchange MRT station

The mall is directly connected to the Tun Razak Exchange MRT station via an underground link between the concourse level of the mall with the upper concourse level of the transit station. The station serves as the only cross-platform interchange in the city that links the MRT Kajang and Putrajaya Lines.

Access to The Exchange TRX from numerous roads were also made possible with the newly built loop tunnel underneath that encircles the whole district within TRX. The tunnel consists of 3 levels where 2 levels are meant for vehicular traffic and 1 level for mechanical and utility services. It forms connections to major highways surrounding it, including the SMART Tunnel, Maju Expressway, Setiawangsa–Pantai Expressway, Jalan Tun Razak as well as Jalan Sultan Ismail.

== Incidents ==
=== Fallen crane ===
According to the developer, an incident had occurred during the construction of the retail mall where the jib of a tower crane had fallen at the site around 6pm on 13 April 2021. It was noted that the crane fell over due to the heavy storm at that moment while no injuries nor deaths were reported.

=== Building defects ===
The mall was faced with numerous issues during its first week of operations with shoddy workmanship of the building ranging from cracked tiles and unfinished ceilings to malfunctioned escalators and elevators. On the second day of its opening, it suffered from a power outage in the morning, persisted for hours before the electricity was back to normal. The mall also had to cordon and close off the central water play area at its outdoor playground to work on the repairs due to it being broken.

== Gallery ==
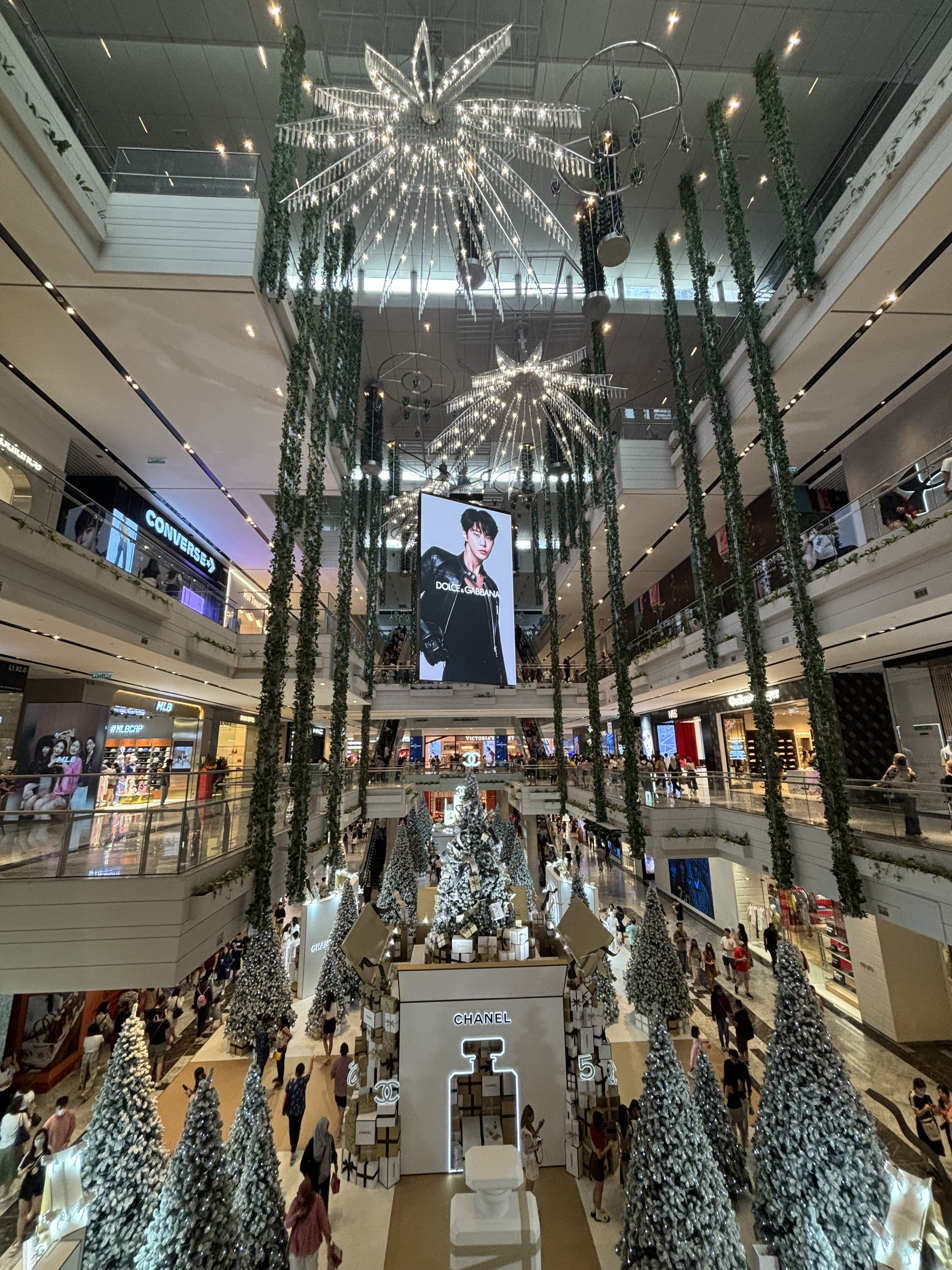
Central Exchange (Main Atrium)

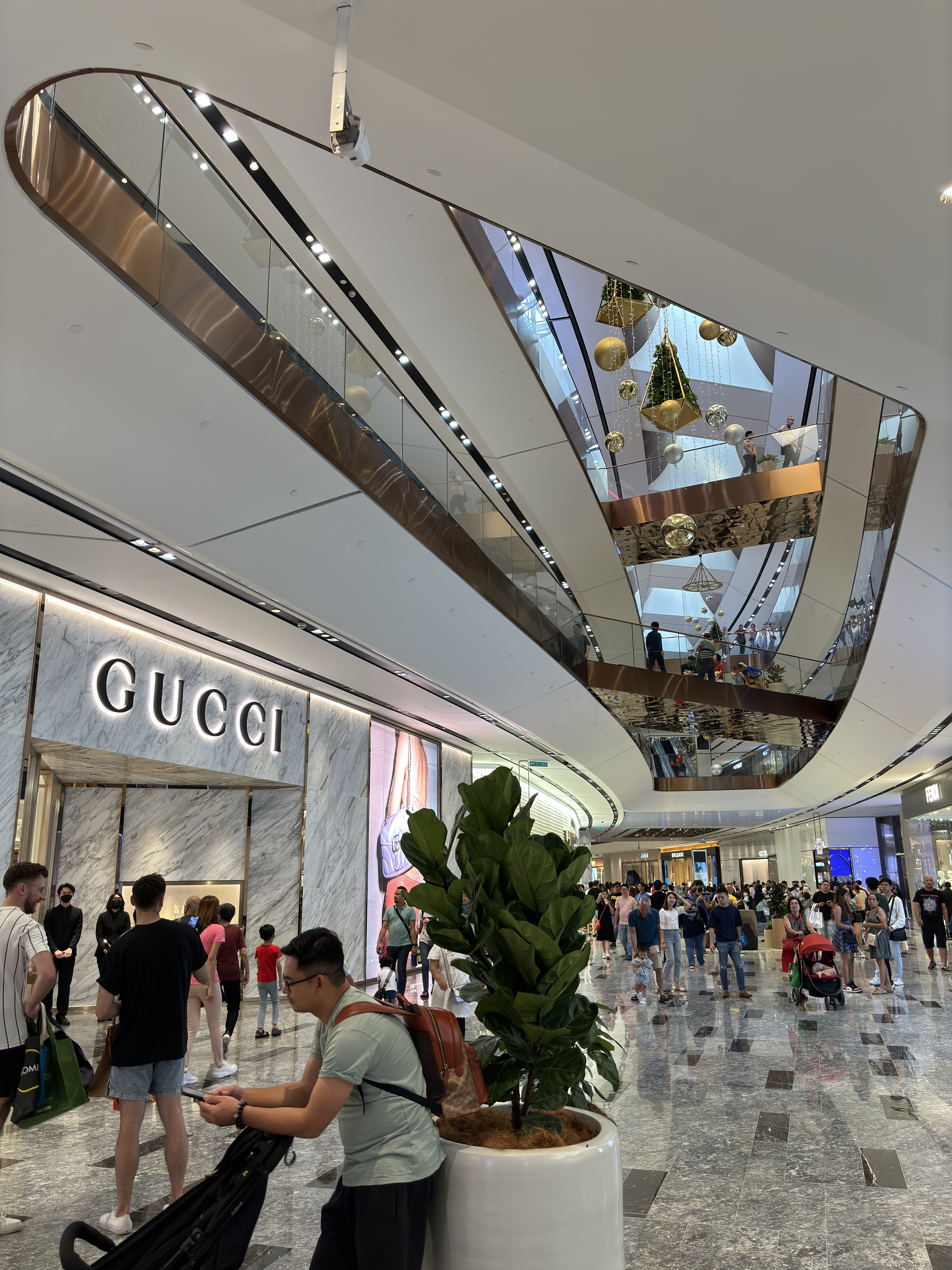
Park Avenue zone from Ground Level

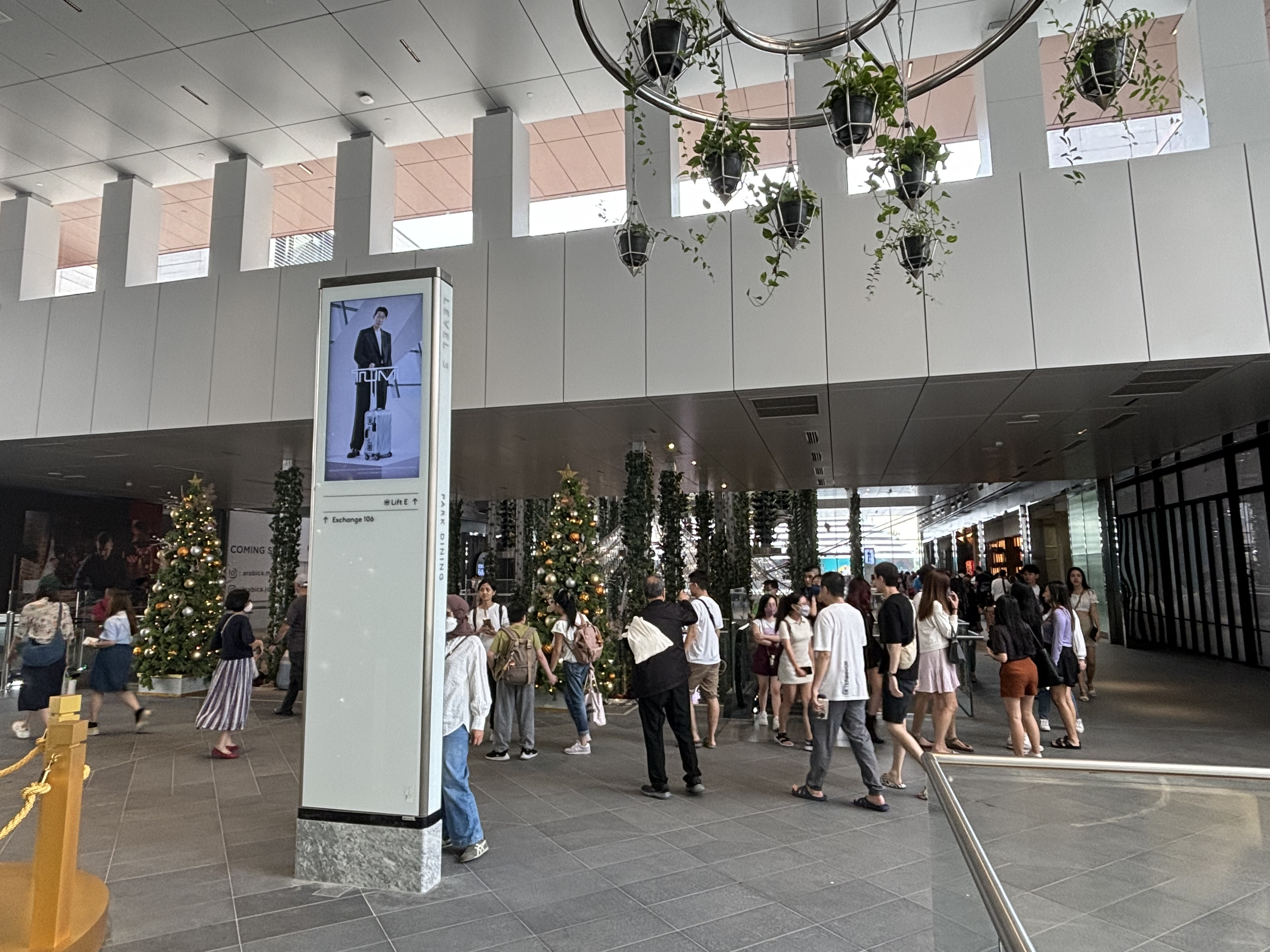
Park Dining precinct at Level 3 of the mall

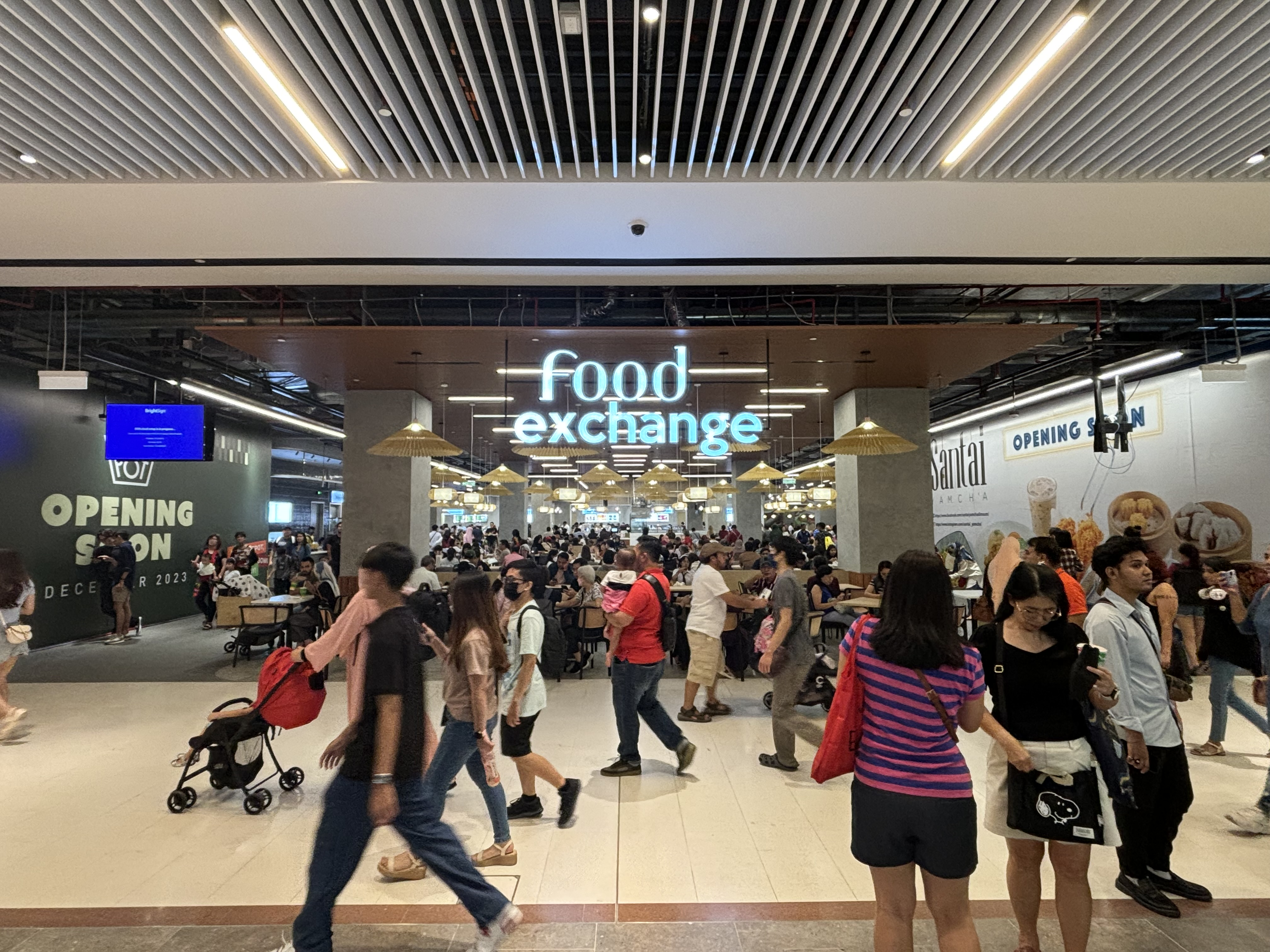
Food Exchange Food Court at Concourse Level

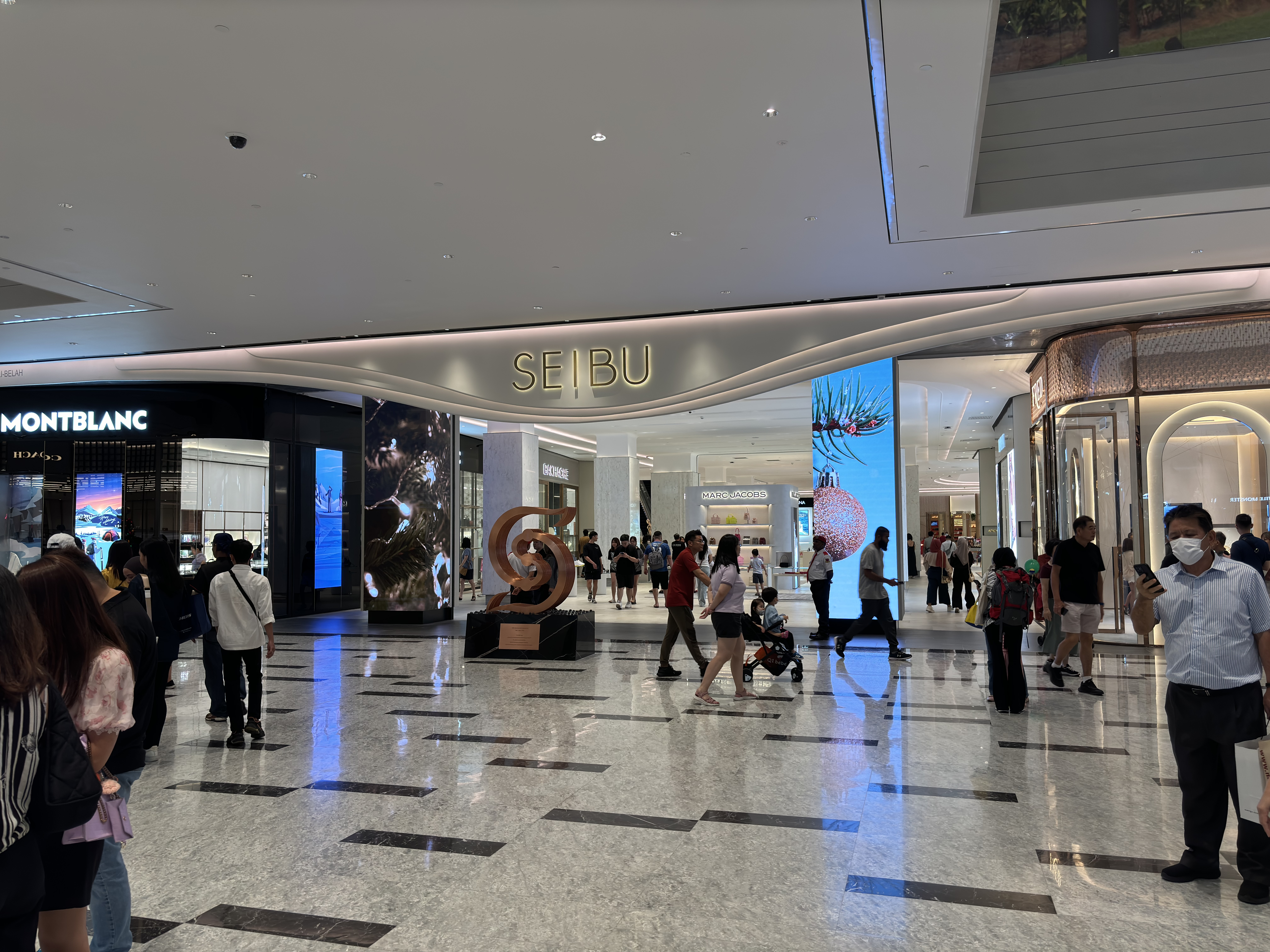
Main entrance to Seibu

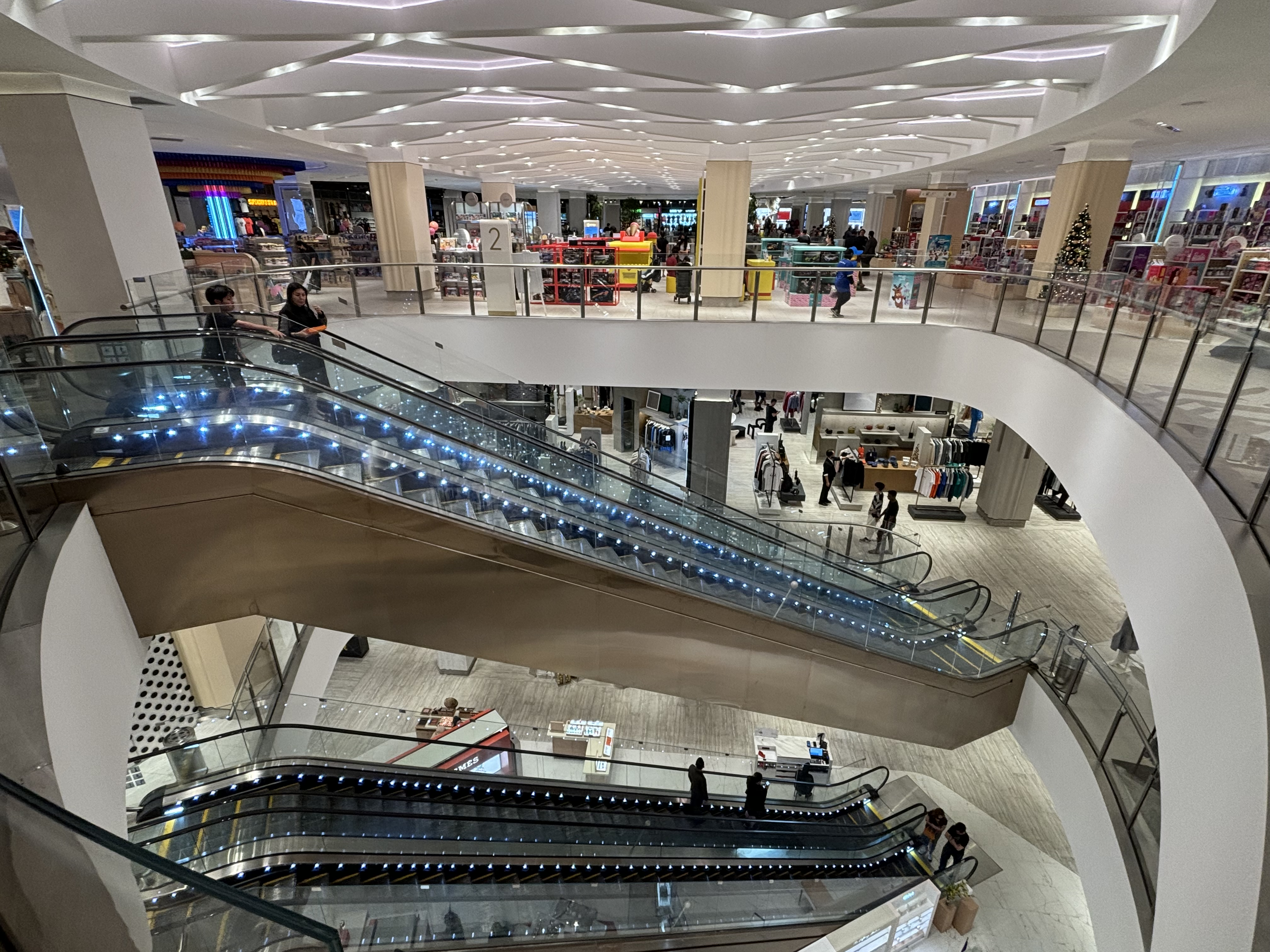
Seibu Department Store (2nd Floor)

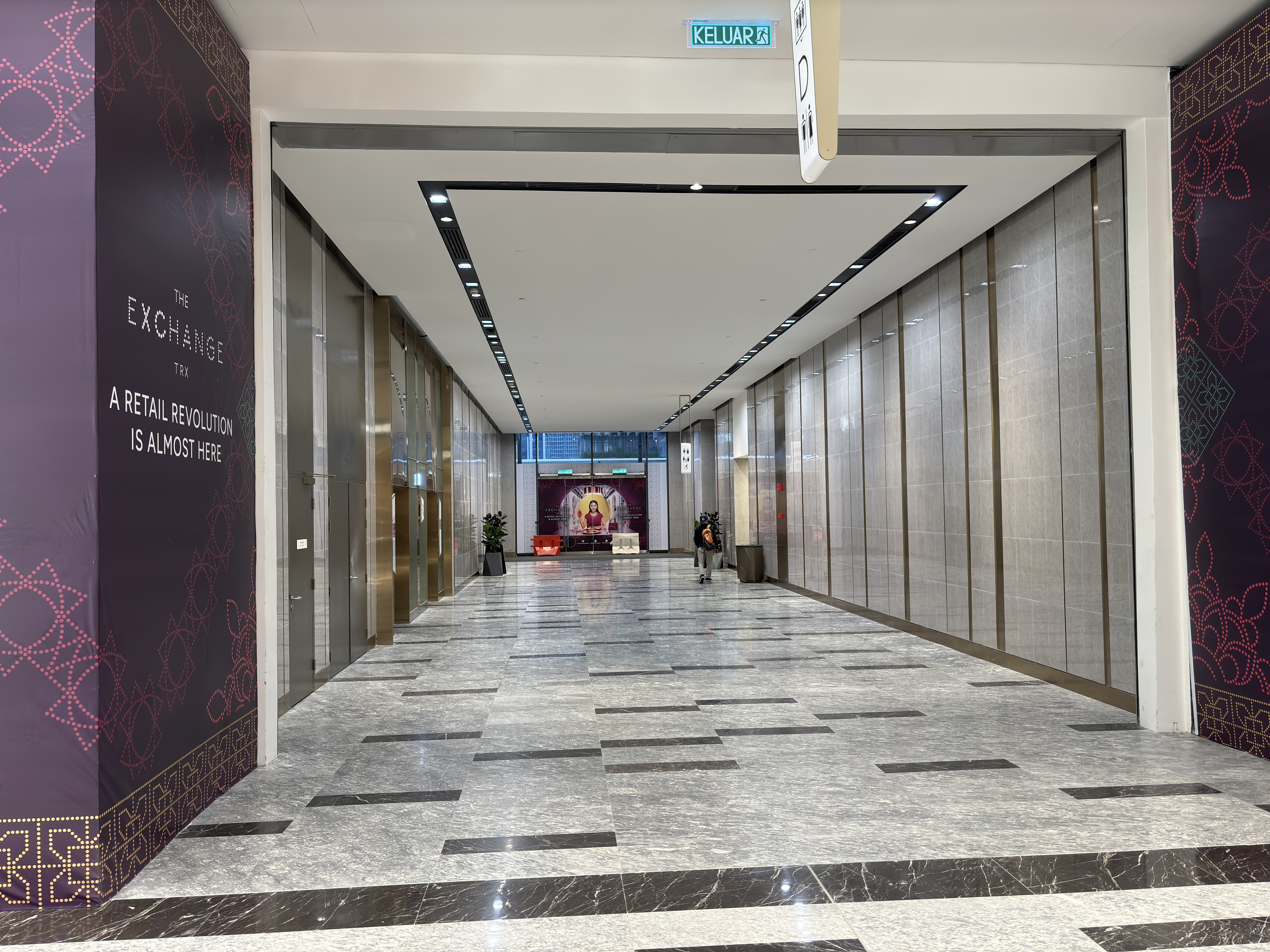
One of the future links to Market Lane

The outdoor Dining Terrace precinct at Level 2

The concourse level (basement)

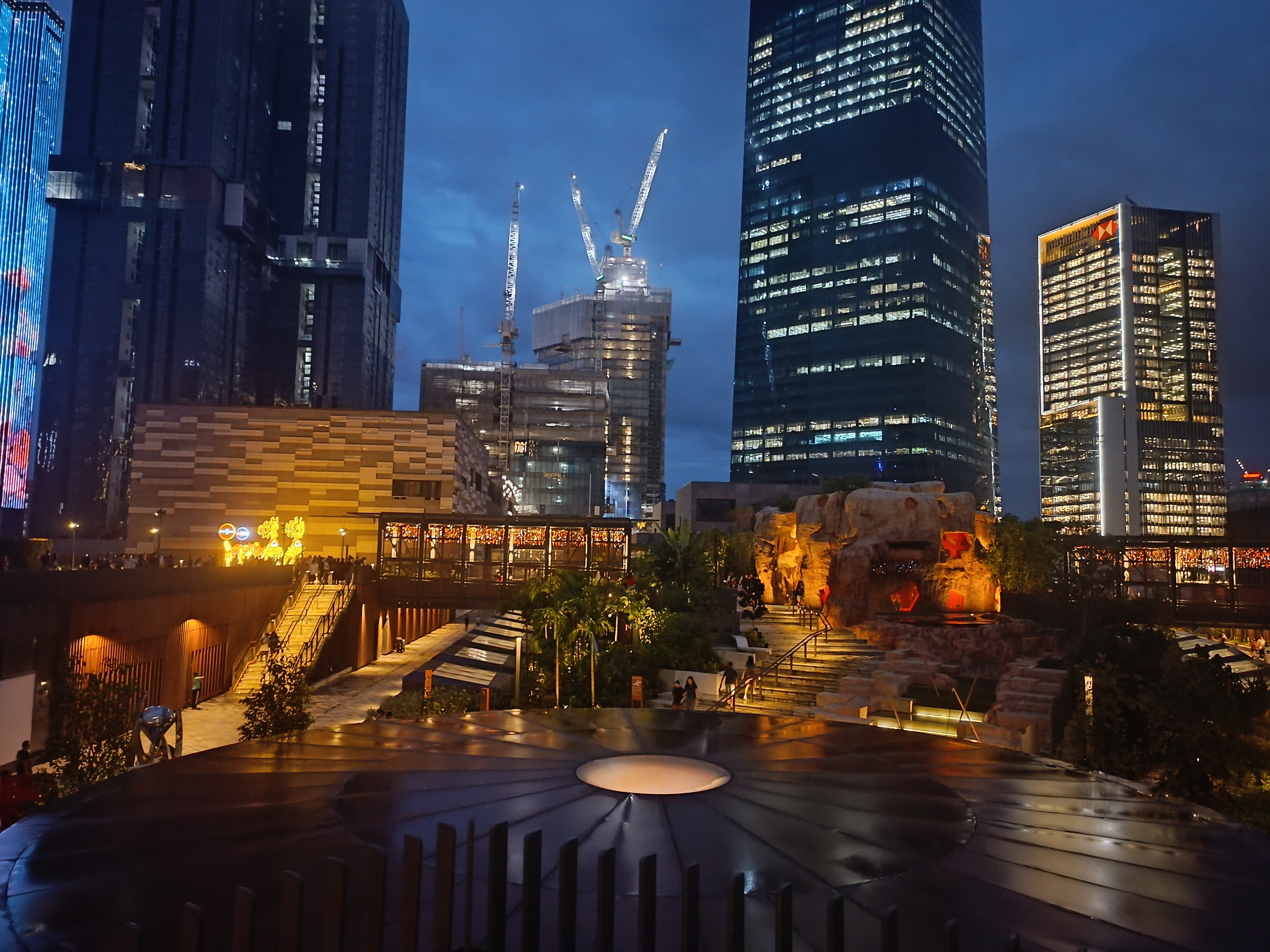
TRX City Park at night

Entrance from the MRT Plaza

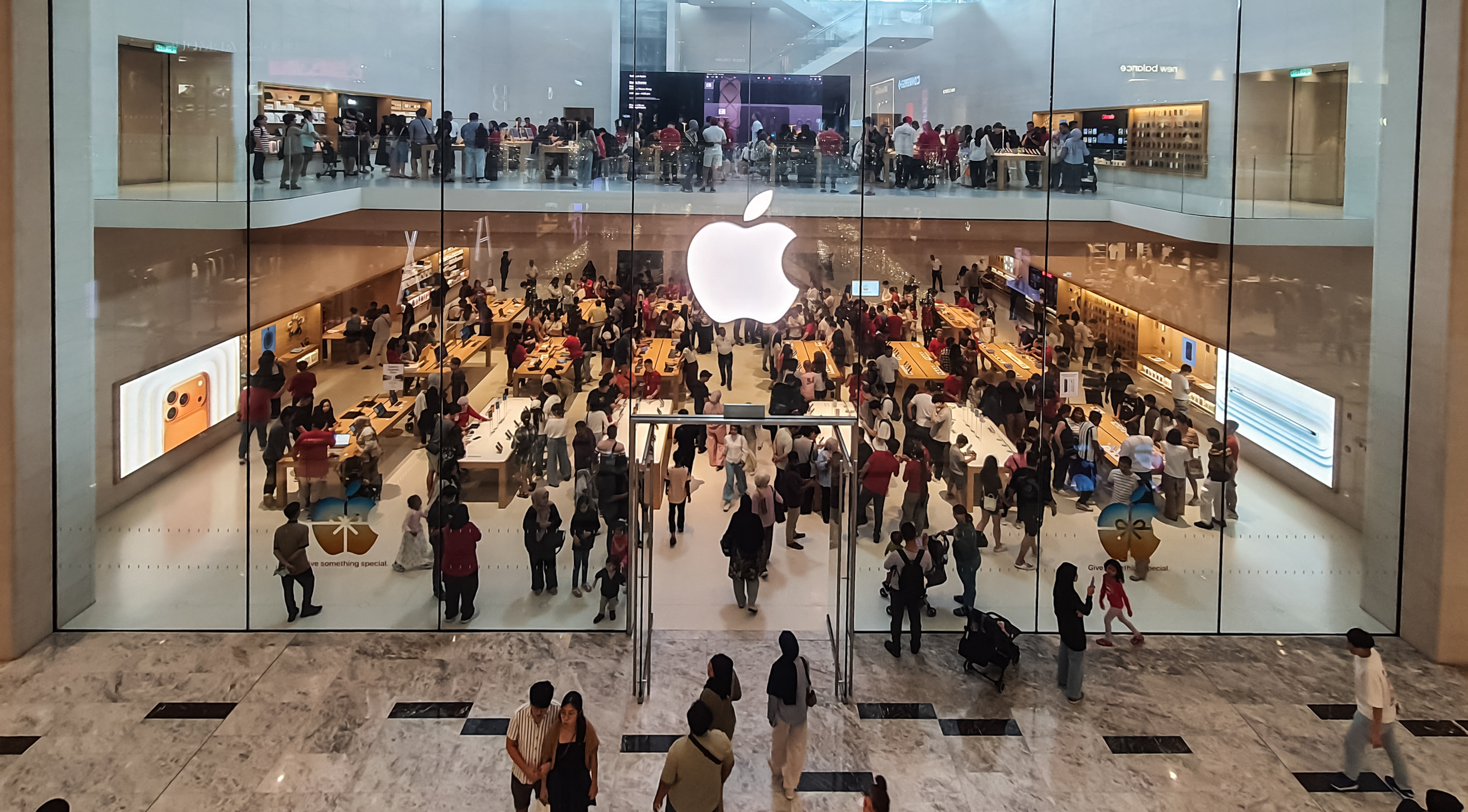
The mall entrance of the Apple store.

== See also ==
- List of shopping malls in Malaysia
- Bukit Bintang City Centre
- Kuala Lumpur City Centre
- Kwasa Damansara
- Setia City Mall
