= Tun Razak Exchange =

Central business district in Kuala Lumpur, Malaysia

- Central business district
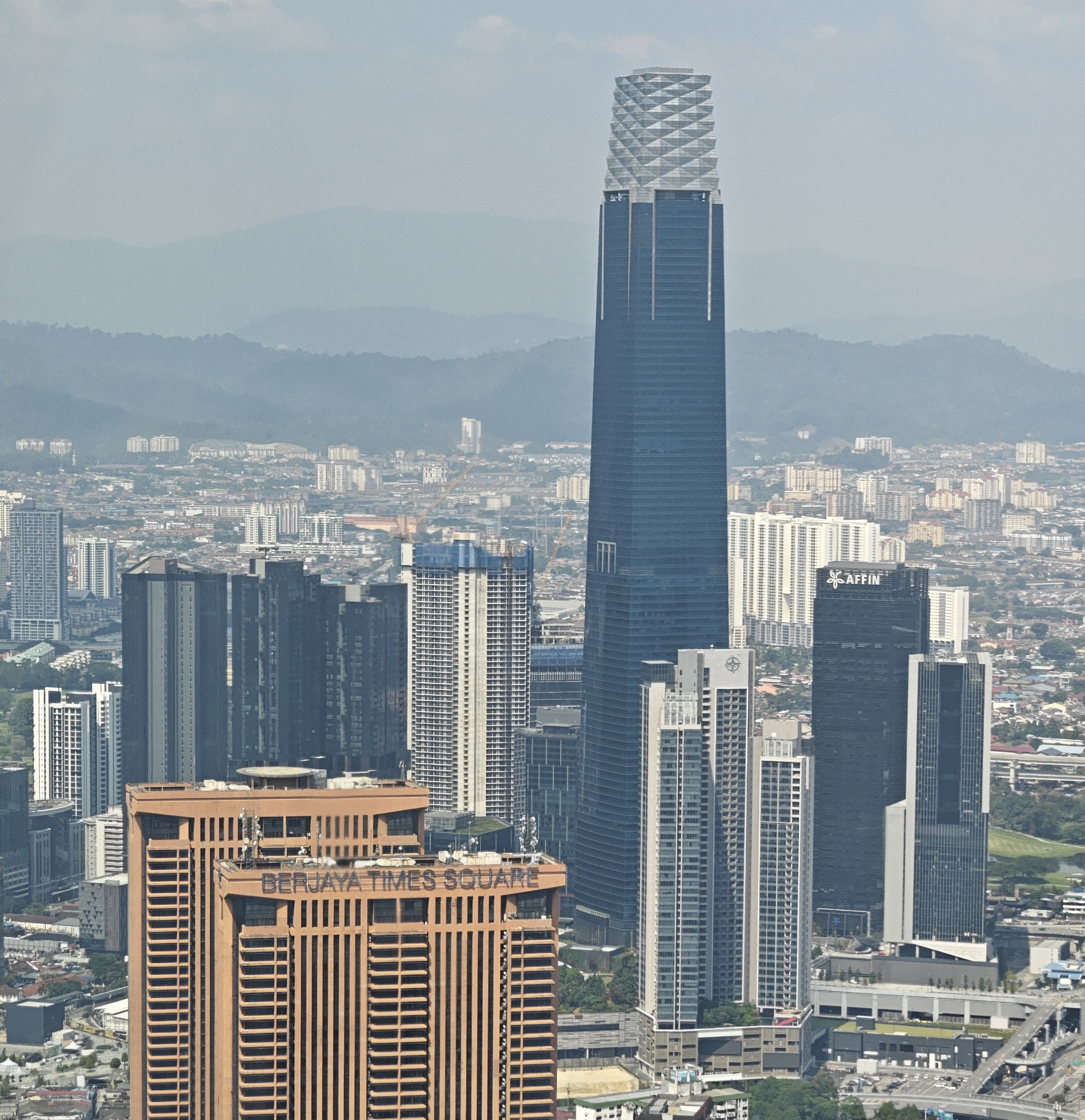
- Skyline of TRX with Berjaya Times Square in the foreground in August 2025

- Logo
- Nickname: TRX
- Location of TRX in Kuala Lumpur
- Coordinates: 3.142°N 101.718°E
- Country: Malaysia
- City: Kuala Lumpur

Area
  - Total: 28 ha (70 acres)
- Time zone: UTC+8 (Malaysia Standard Time)
- Postal code: 55188
- Website: trx.my

The Tun Razak Exchange, otherwise known as TRX (previously known as Kuala Lumpur International Financial District or KLIFD), is a 70-acre development by Ministry of Finance Malaysia (MOF) in the heart of Kuala Lumpur for international finance and business. The development was named after the second Prime Minister of Malaysia, Tun Abdul Razak Hussein, due to its location along Jalan Tun Razak. TRX was planned during the era of the sixth Prime Minister, Datuk Seri Najib Tun Abdul Razak and it is a strategic enabler of the Malaysian government's Economic Transformation Programme (ETP).

The master plan includes a total of 26 buildings and over 21 million ft^{2} of Gross Floor Area (GFA) spread across the office, residential, hotel, retail, F&B and cultural offerings.

The project has a development period of 15 years to be completed in phases with the initial Phase 1 slated for completion in 2017/2018.

TRX's landmark building is The Exchange 106, currently the third tallest skyscraper in Malaysia, and was the second tallest upon completion.

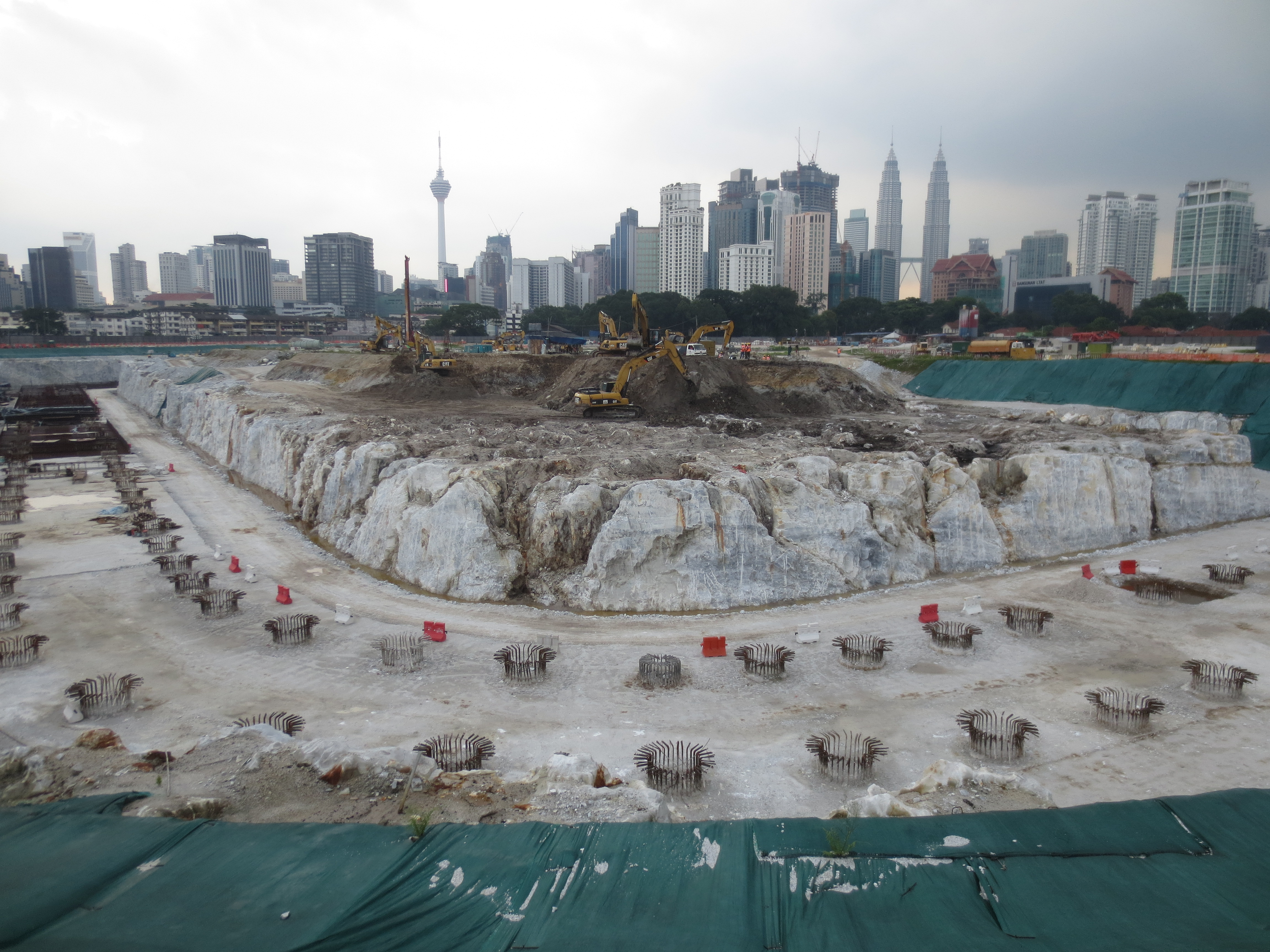
TRX site in May 2015.

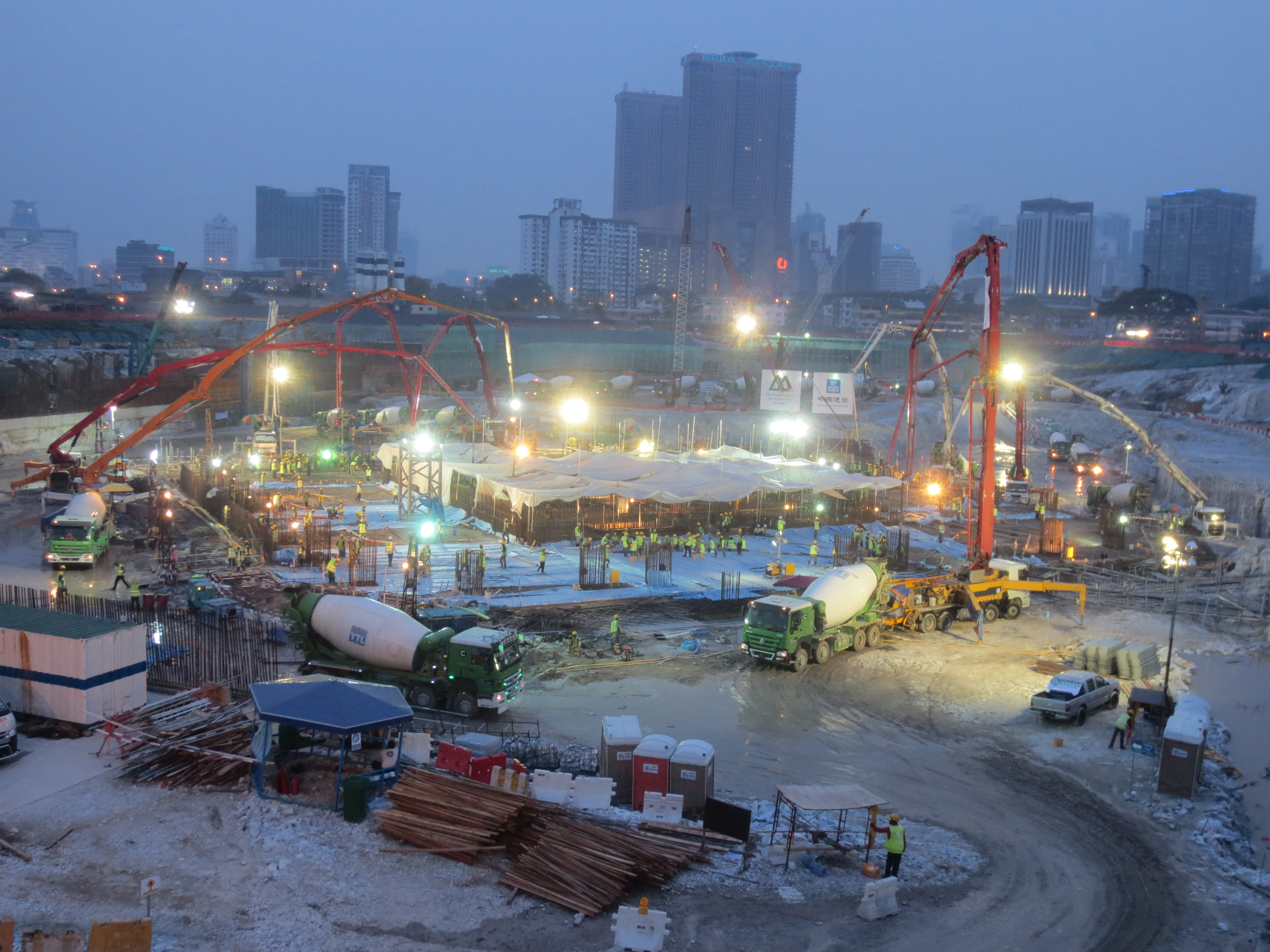
Groundworks of Exchange 106 tower in May 2016.

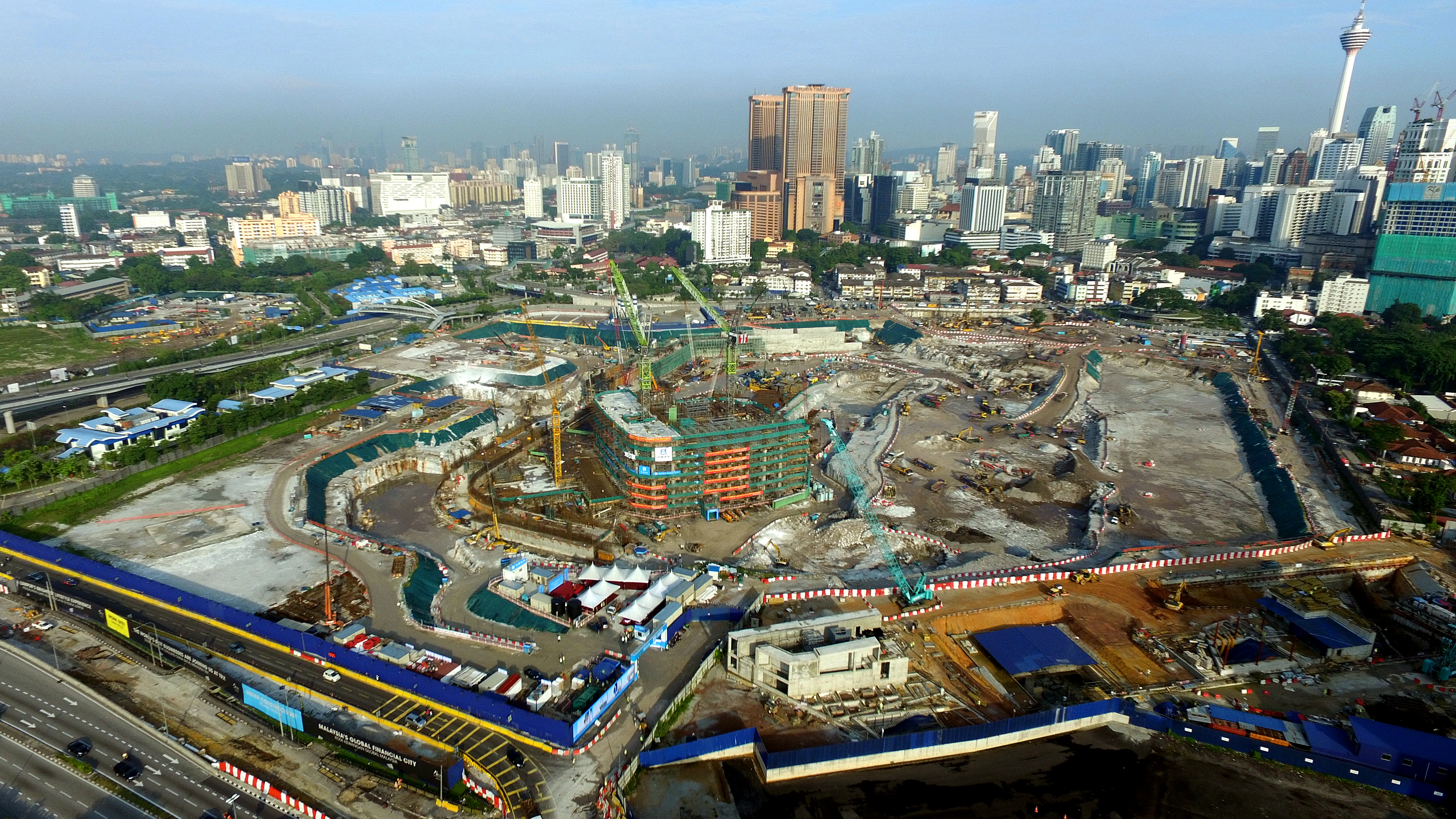
Construction of the development in July 2016.

== List of tallest buildings in Tun Razak Exchange complex ==
1. Menara Exchange 106 - 453.6 m (1,488 ft) - 106 - Completed

2. TRX Residence B - 235 m (771 ft) - 57 - Completed

3. Menara Affin - 233 m (764 ft) - 47 - Completed

4. Menara Golden Eagle - Hotel, Office and Residence - 217 m (712 ft) - 60 - Under construction

5. TRX Residence A - 230 m (750 ft) - 53 - Completed

6. CORE Residence - 228 m (748 ft) - 50 - Completed

7. Menara TS Law - 210 m (690 ft) - 48 - Completed

8. Menara IQ - 150.4 m (493 ft) - 34 - Completed

9. Menara Prudential - 131 m (430 ft) - 27 - Completed

10. Kimpton Hotel - 115 m (377 ft) - 29 - Completed

11. The Exchange TRX Office Block - 105 m (344 ft) - 13 - Under construction

12. The Exchange TRX Mall - 20 m (66 ft) - 6 - Completed

== Developer ==
The master developer of the Tun Razak Exchange development is TRX City Sdn Bhd, a company wholly owned by the Malaysian Ministry of Finance, Inc.

== Location ==
Tun Razak Exchange is located in the eastern edge of Kuala Lumpur's central business district, sandwiched between Bukit Bintang, Pudu, Cochrane, Kampung Pandan and Ampang Hilir. The Royal Selangor Golf Club is across Jalan Tun Razak, as well as RHB Bank's national headquarters and Zouk KL.

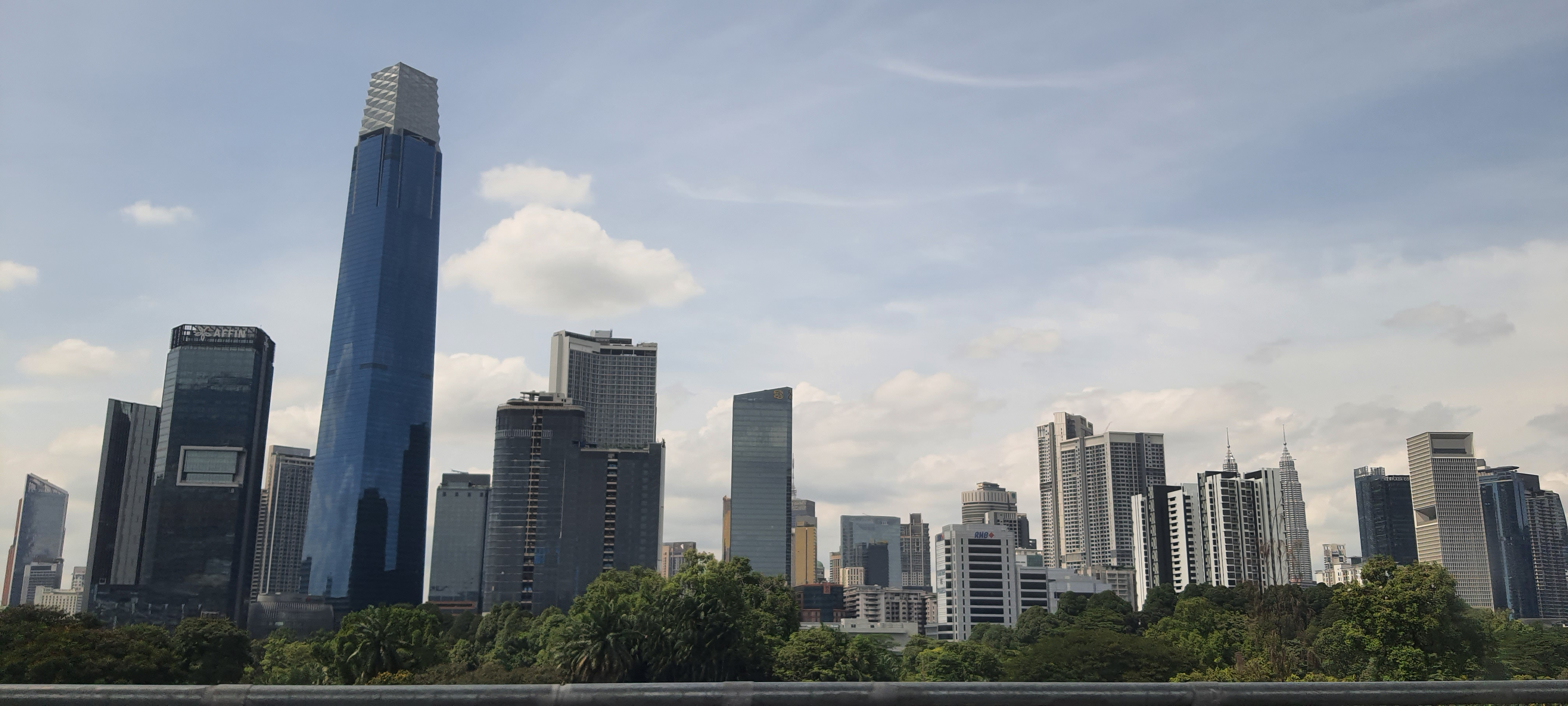
Kuala Lumpur city skyline as seen from Kampung Pandan, the cluster of buildings to the left is Tun Razak Exchange, with The Exchange 106 tower as its central landmark.

== Transportation ==
=== Public transportation ===
Since July 2017, there is the Tun Razak Exchange MRT station, served by the MRT Kajang Line and MRT Putrajaya Line. Rapid KL bus route T407 (an MRT feeder route) connects the MRT station to Kampung Pandan while the longer route 402 (ordinary route) connects to Maluri, Jalan Ampang, KLCC, Hospital Kuala Lumpur and finally the Titiwangsa bus hub.

=== Car ===
The Tun Razak Exchange site is located near the entrance to the SMART Tunnel and adjacent to the junction of Jalan Tun Razak, Jalan Kampung Pandan, as well as the Maju Expressway which connects downtown Kuala Lumpur to Cyberjaya and Putrajaya. Tun Razak Exchange is also situated beside an exit of the Setiawangsa-Pantai Expressway (SPE).

== Investors ==
=== Lendlease – The Exchange TRX ===
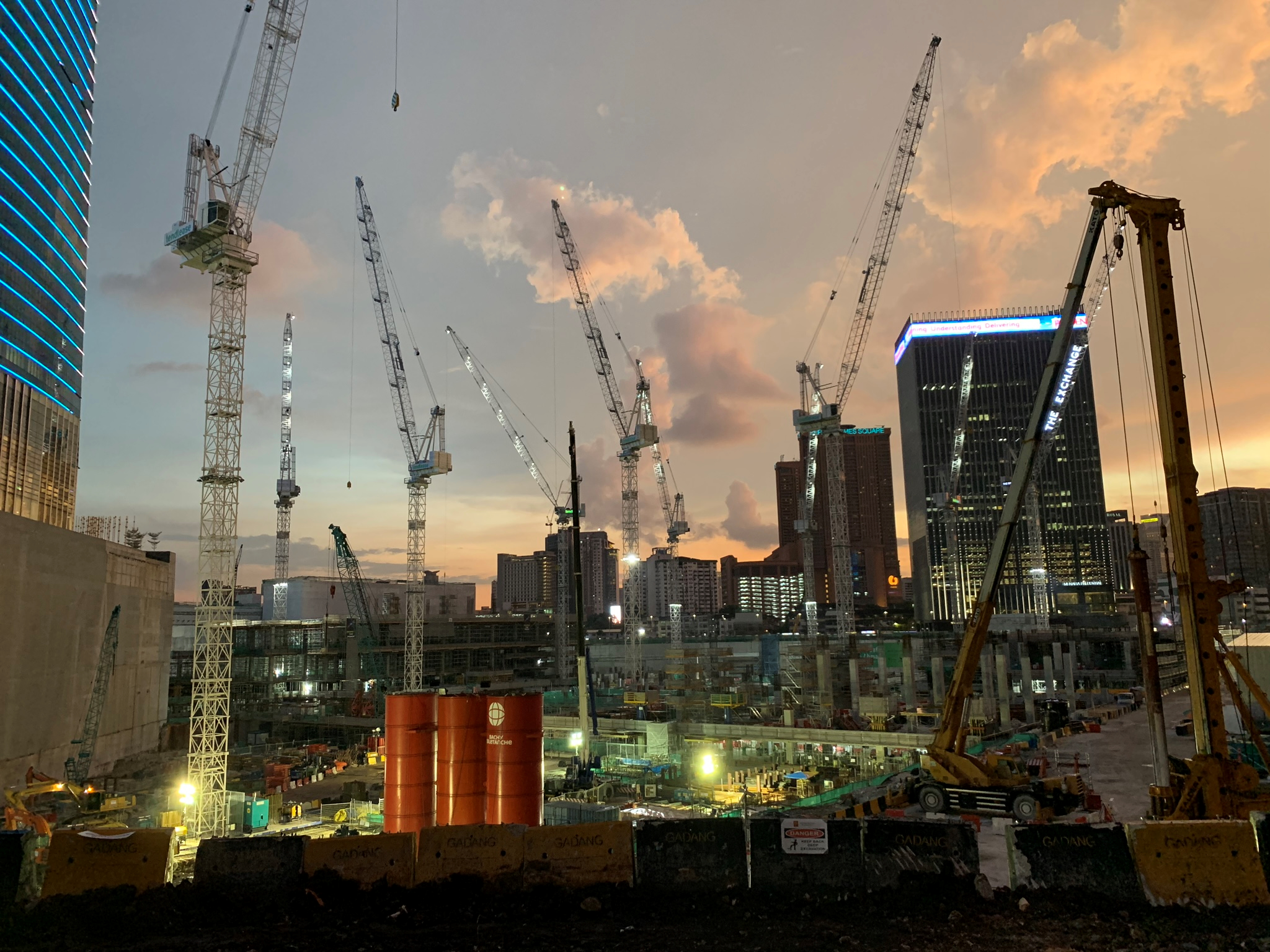
The Exchange TRX mall under construction in May 2019

In March 2015, TRX City Sdn Bhd, a wholly owned subsidiary of the Malaysian Minister of Finance Inc., signed a Joint Venture Master Framework Agreement with Lendlease, an Australia-based property and infrastructure group to develop the TRX's Lifestyle Quarter, which has been renamed as The Exchange TRX. Lendlease has a 60% stake in the joint venture, and TRX City Sdn Bhd has the remaining 40%. The retail-led mixed-use development entered the construction phase in September 2017 after a 2-year design period, with completion expected in 2020/21. Lendlease secured an RM2.15 billion loan to complete this RM9 billion development.

It will occupy over 17 acres and would comprise a retail mall (The Exchange TRX) located underneath a 10-acre central park (TRX City Park), 6 residential towers (TRX Residences) and a luxury hotel (Malaysia's first Kimpton Hotel, with 471 rooms) connected to the multi-layered central park as well as the Tun Razak Exchange MRT station. The central park will connect all the buildings within TRX using tumbling, terraced greenery, water features and shaded sections. Once completed, the development has a forecast gross development value of over RM9.5 billion. The Exchange TRX, with a nett lettable area of 120,773 square metres, will be a shopping, dining (with five F&B precincts offering local, international and rooftop luxury dining experiences), leisure and entertainment destination featuring over 500 shops.

In October 2017, Lendlease Development Malaysia Sdn Bhd said that more than 26% of the Exchange had been successfully leased to three anchor tenants:

- Seibu Department Store (occupying 250,000 sq ft, first department store to brought depachika food hall concept to Malaysia, occupying 250,000 sq ft space)
- Dairy Farm Group, parent of Cold Storage & Giant (In 2023, Cold Storage & Giant businesses were acquired by Macrovalue Sdn Bhd., effectively taking over the space. Under its new owners, the mall's supermarket will be under Cold Storage's Mercato brand, occupying 23,000 sq ft)
- Golden Screen Cinemas (offering new cinematic experiences under Aurum brand)

% Arabica will also be opening a roastery and it will be the second outlet in Malaysia upon completion of the mall. Other well-known retailers that will make their presence at the mall include Kiehl's, Diptyque, Coach, Tiffany & Co, Fendi, Hublot, Dior, Burberry, Saint Laurent, Gucci, Chanel, Louis Vuitton, Guerlain, Rimowa, Lancôme, Bell & Ross, Steve Madden, Gentle Monster and many more.

In December 2022, the project director of The Exchange TRX, Mitch Wilson, said that the mall will include more than 400 stores across four retail levels. The mall was opened to the public on 29 November 2023.

=== Mulia Group – The Exchange 106 ===
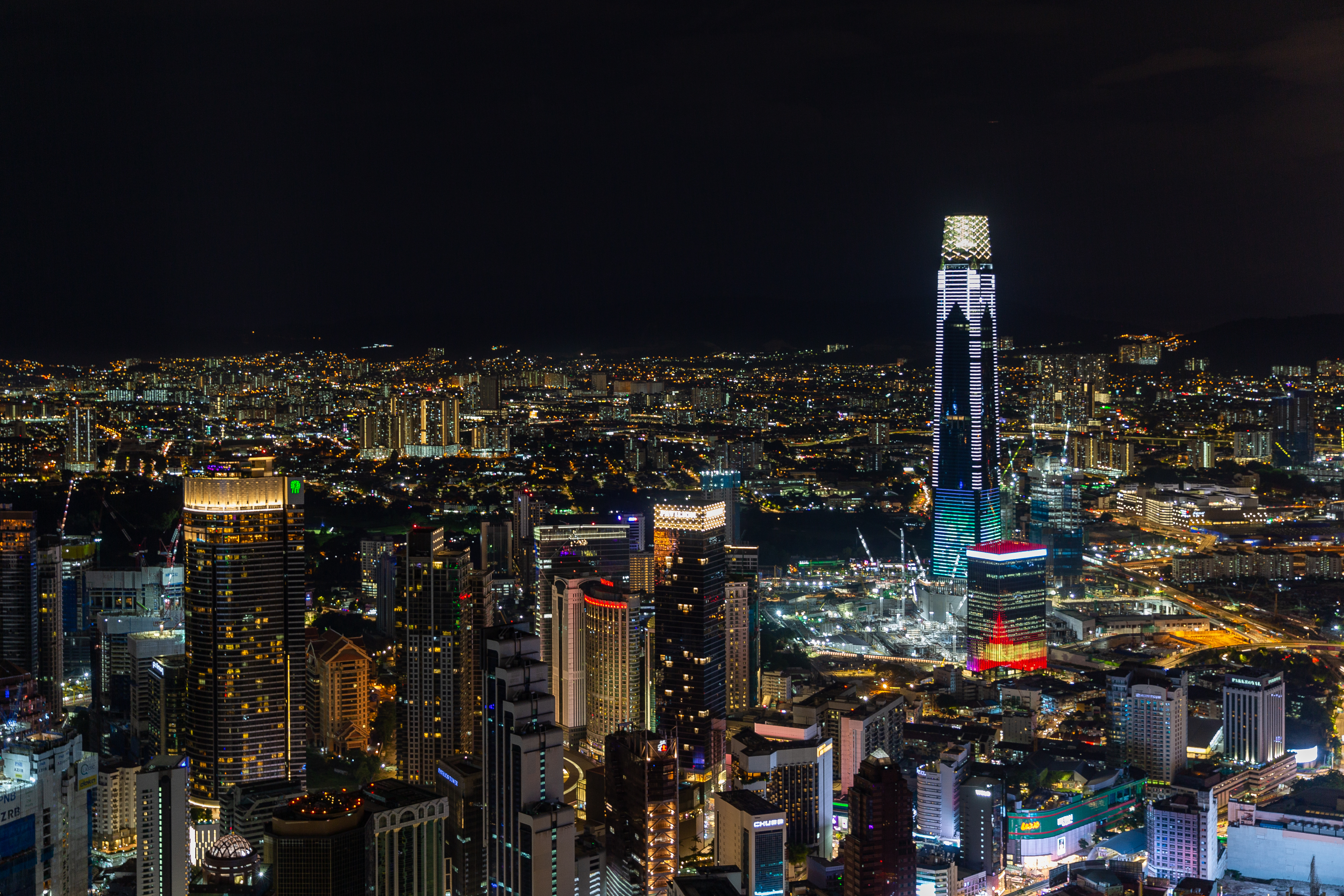
Aerial view of The Exchange 106 and TRX in November 2019

Following the partnership with Lendlease, TRX announced its Sale and Purchase agreement with the Mulia Group to develop the Signature Tower. In April 2016, the Mulia Group announced that all excavation, blasting, piling and site work have been completed within three months. The next phase of the Signature Tower construction saw the pouring of concrete, a massive 20,000 m3 mat foundation. The Signature Tower, now named The Exchange 106, the tallest building in TRX and one of the tallest in Malaysia, is the TRX's centrepiece landmark. It has 106 floors with massive column-free floor plates ranging from 28,000 to 34,000 square feet, a gross floor area of about four million sq. ft., and a nett lettable area of 2.8 million sq ft.

=== HSBC Bank Malaysia – Headquarters ===
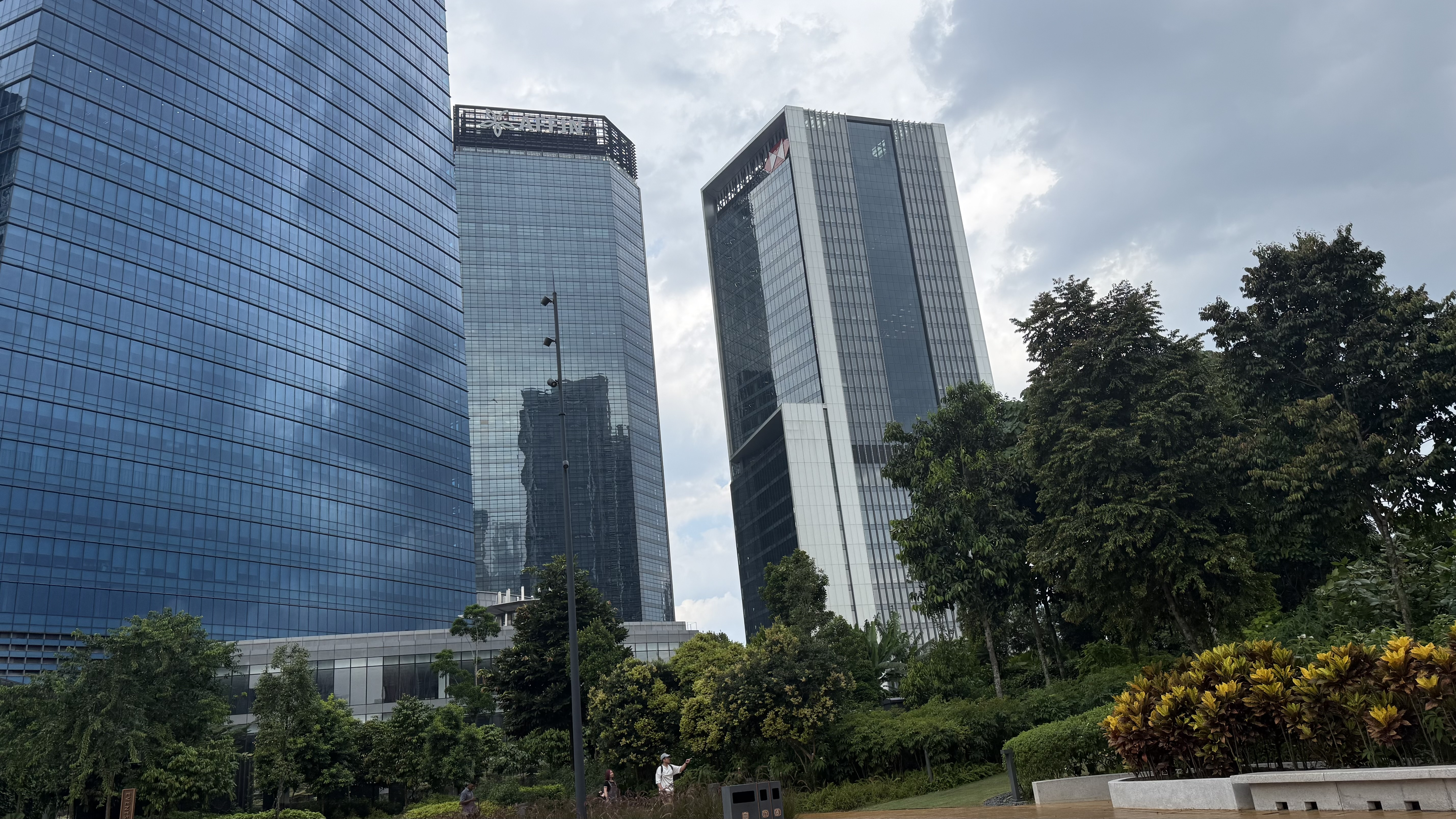
Affin bank & HSBC Malaysia buildings viewed from the rooftop garden

HSBC Bank Malaysia invested US$250 million for its new headquarters at TRX, and it was reportedly the first foreign bank in Malaysia to invest in the project. The new HSBC headquarters, named Menara IQ, will have a minimum office space of 568,000 square feet. It has appointed IJM Construction Sdn Bhd as the contractor to undertake the HSBC Malaysia headquarters' design and construction for a contract sum of approximately RM392 million (excluding lifts and facade works). HSBC formally relocated its Malaysian headquarters to TRX in March 2022, replacing its old headquarters at Market Square where it had been since British colonial rule.

=== Prudential Malaysia – Headquarters ===
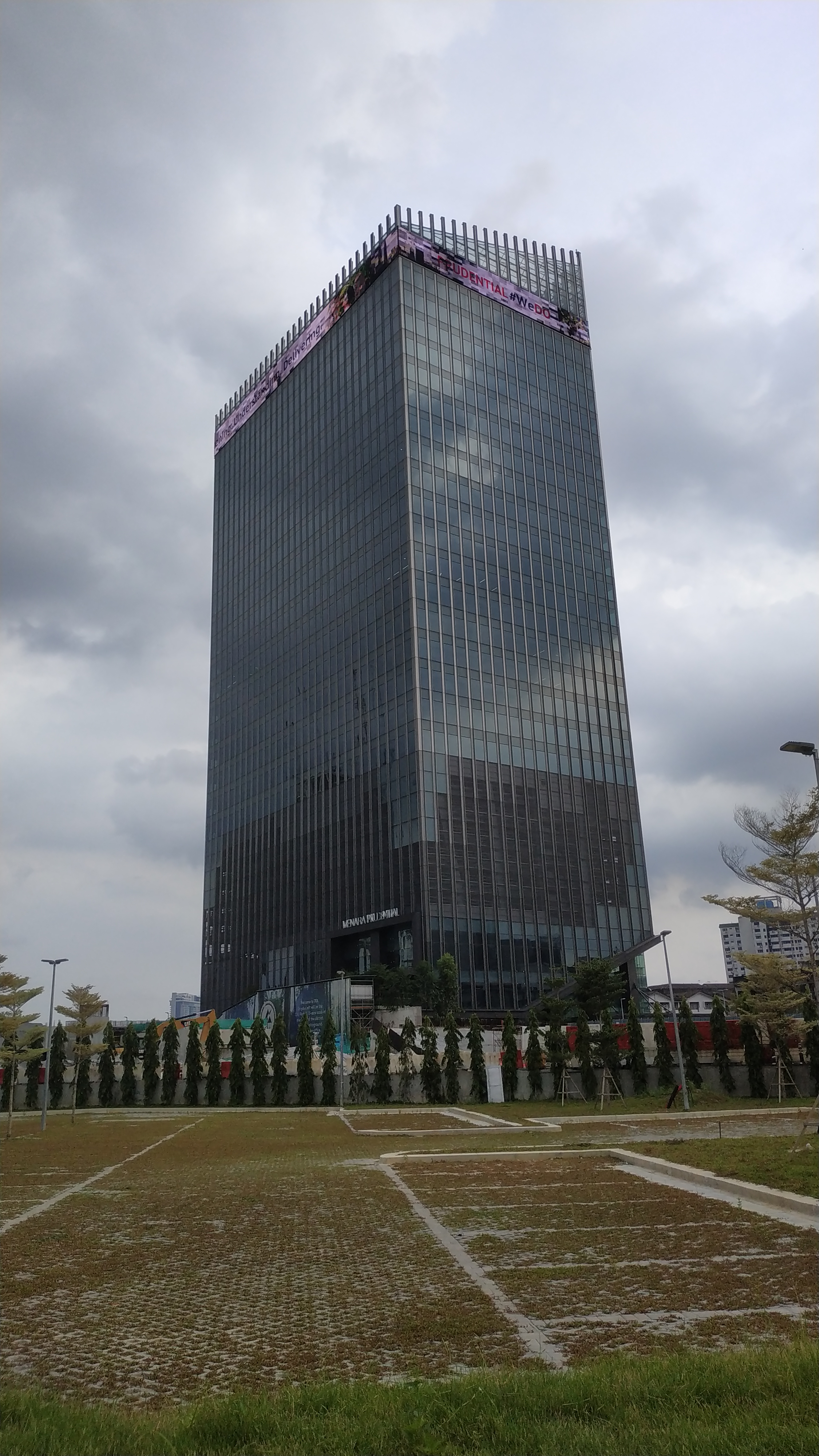
Menara Prudential in May 2020

Prudential Malaysia has relocated its Malaysia headquarters to a 27-storey purpose-built building in the TRX's financial district. The new Prudential headquarters, located adjacent to TRX's main pedestrian gateway from the Bukit Bintang area, incorporates the traditional Malaysian element of Tengkolok Diraja (a Malay royal headgear). With 51,018 m^{2} of Grade A office space, the building will house all of Prudential's life insurance and asset management businesses in Malaysia under one roof. The owner-cum-developer of this building is IJM Corp Bhd, through its wholly owned subsidiary Fairview Valley Sdn Bhd. IJM Construction Sdn Bhd is the main contractor of this Grade A, LEED Gold-certified office building. Construction work on this 27-storey building started in January 2017, and by December 2017, IJM had completed the building's structural works up to its top floor. As of the second half of 2018, IJM had already secured tenants (which includes Prudential Malaysia) for 84% of its net lettable area. The building was designed by Broadway Malyan, a global architectural firm after it won an international design competition for the building.

=== Affin Bank – Headquarters ===
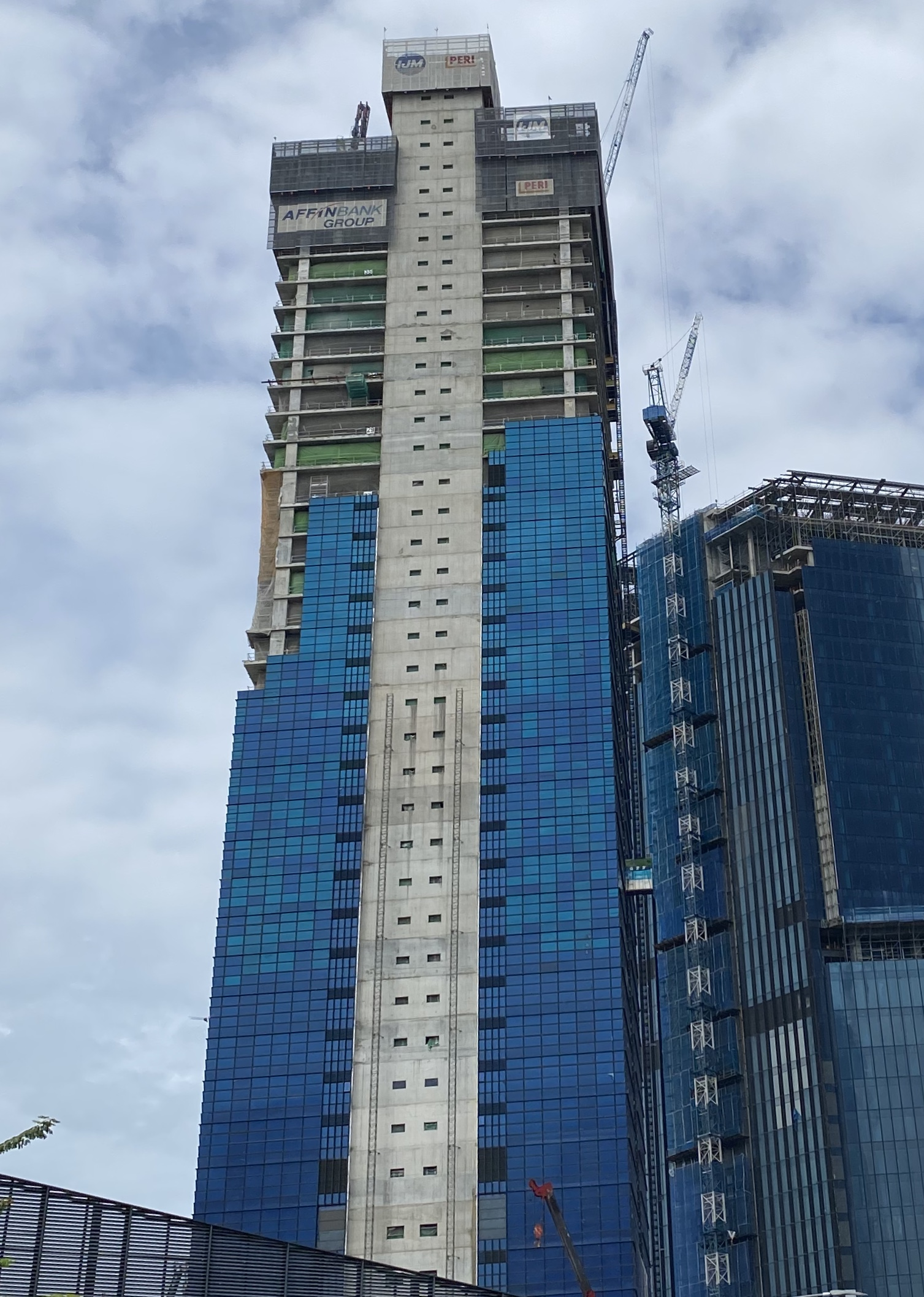
Affin Bank Headquarters in TRX, under construction in July 2020.

Affin Bank Berhad will build its new headquarters on a site located in the district's Financial Quarter. In April 2017, the bank signed an agreement to acquire a 54,266 sq ft plot of land on which it will build its headquarters, for a total cost of RM555 million. In September 2018, IJM Construction Sdn Bhd was awarded RM505 million superstructure contract for the construction of Affin Bank's new 47-storey headquarters. The building, expected to be completed by the end of 2020, features a banking hall, auditorium and convention facilities, and access to the TRX MRT station via a sunken plaza, spacious outdoor terraces and sky gardens.

=== China Communications and Construction Group (CCCG) and WCT Group – Residential Development (CORE Residence @ TRX) ===
In October 2015, WCT Holdings Berhad, through its subsidiary WCT Precious Development Sdn Bhd (WCTPD), agreed to purchase a land plot within TRX for a sum of RM223 million. Together with this, WCT was awarded RM754 million contract to construct and complete infrastructure and roadways in TRX. In August 2017, WCT announced that its subsidiary WCT Land Sdn Bhd and WCTPD had agreed with CCCG Overseas Real Estate Pte Ltd (CORE) to develop this plot of TRX land.

In January 2019, Core Precious Development Sdn Bhd (80% owned by CCCG and 20% WCT), held the groundbreaking ceremony for this project (named CORE Residence @ TRX), which comprises two serviced residence towers and one serviced apartment tower, scheduled to be completed in 2023 with handover in 2024. The project features 700 residential units, catering to financial professionals and expatriates.

=== Urusharta Jamaah Sdn Bhd – Mixed-Use Development ===
Lembaga Tabung Haji bought a 0.631-hectare piece of land in TRX for RM188.5 million in 2015. In 2017, Tabung Haji announced that its TRX development would encompass a mix of apartments, serviced apartments, and other commercial developments, with a gross development value estimated at RM900 million. In January 2019, Lembaga Tabung Haji sold its plot of land at a premium to Urusharta Jamaah Sdn Bhd, a company owned by the Malaysian government.

=== CCCC – Asean Regional Headquarters ===
China Communications Construction Co Ltd (CCCC) will build a commercial tower that it will use as its hub for the ASEAN region. The CCCC tower will be constructed on the land that was previously earmarked for the construction of high-end serviced apartments by WCT Holdings, but WCT has denied this – see the WCT section below.

=== Veolia Water – Water Treatment and Recycling ===
TRX signed a 20-year concession agreement with Veolia Water Technologies Southeast Asia in September 2014, for wastewater treatment and recycled water supply in TRX. A key component of TRX's sustainability framework, the district is supported by Veolia's onsite cooling system to reduce energy consumption and wastewater recycling treatment to conserve water, as well as a large urban public green realm for Kuala Lumpur.

== See also ==
- 1Malaysia Development Berhad
- Bandar Malaysia
- KL Metropolis
- Malaysian National Projects
