= Tun Razak Exchange MRT station =

Metro station in Kuala Lumpur, Malaysia

KG20 PY23 Tun Razak Exchange
- Entrance A with the former brand name, 2024

General information
- Other names: Malay: تون رزاق ايکسچينج (Jawi); Chinese: 敦拉萨国际贸易中心; Tamil: துன் ரசாக் எக்ஸ்சேஞ்ச்
- Location: Jalan Delima, Imbi; 55100 Kuala Lumpur; Malaysia
- Coordinates: 3°8′32.65″N 101°43′12.56″E
- System: Rapid KL
- Owner: MRT Corp
- Operator: Rapid Rail
- Lines: 9 Kajang Line; 12 Putrajaya Line
- Platforms: 2 stacked island platforms
- Tracks: 4
- Connections: Rapid Bus

Construction
- Structure type: Underground
- Depth: 44.5 metres (146 ft)
- Platform levels: 2
- Parking: Not available
- Cycle facilities: Not available
- Accessible: Yes

Other information
- Status: Operational
- Station code: KG20 PY23

History
- Opened: 17 July 2017; 9 years ago (Kajang Line); 16 March 2023; 3 years ago (Putrajaya Line)
- Former names: Pasar Rakyat, Tun Razak Exchange–Samsung Galaxy (2024–2026)

Services
Preceding station		Following station
Bukit Bintang towards Kwasa Damansara	Kajang Line	Cochrane towards Kajang
Conlay towards Kwasa Damansara	Putrajaya Line	Chan Sow Lin towards Putrajaya Sentral
Location

The Tun Razak Exchange (TRX) MRT station is an underground mass rapid transit (MRT) station which serves the new Tun Razak Exchange (TRX) financial district, as well as the surrounding Jalan Tun Razak, Jalan Kamuning, Jalan Inai and Jalan Delima areas of Kuala Lumpur, Malaysia.

The station is an interchange station which allows for cross-platform interchange between the MRT Kajang Line and the MRT Putrajaya Line.

The station was opened on 17 July 2017 as part of Phase Two operations of the Kajang Line. It became an interchange station with the Putrajaya Line when Phase Two operations of the line commenced on 16 March 2023.

Under the station naming rights programme, the station was previously known as Tun Razak Exchange-Samsung Galaxy.

== Station features ==
=== Station location ===
The station is an underground station located next to Jalan Tun Razak near the Kampung Pandan Roundabout in Kuala Lumpur, Malaysia.

The station is located at the eastern edge of Kuala Lumpur's Tun Razak Exchange financial district and was designed to be an integral part of the development, with a direct linkway to The Exchange Shopping Mall. The interior design of the station was given the theme "Islamic corporate" and adopts the Islamic geometric motifs on its pillars and walls to reflect the status of the district.

=== Station layout ===
This station is the deepest station on the MRT Kajang Line and has 7 underground levels in addition to the ground level. Of the 7 levels, 4 are public floors while the others house machinery and equipment.

G	Street Level	Entrance A, entrance B, feeder bus stop, taxi lay-by, private vehicle lay-by
B2	Upper Concourse	Underground linkway to The Exchange TRX Shopping Mall
B4	Lower Concourse	Ticket vending machines, customer service office, fare gates, toilets in paid area
B5	Upper Platform	Platform 1: 9 Kajang Line towards KG35 Kajang (←)
B5	Upper Platform	Island platform
B5	Upper Platform	Platform 3: 12 Putrajaya Line towards PY41 Putrajaya Sentral (←)
B7	Lower Platform	Platform 2: 9 Kajang Line towards KG04 Kwasa Damansara (→)
B7	Lower Platform	Island platform
B7	Lower Platform	Platform 4: 12 Putrajaya Line towards PY01 Kwasa Damansara (→)

=== Exits and entrances ===
The station has three entrances. At ground level, Entrance A is located at the northern end of the station while Entrance B at the southern end. Additionally, an underground entrance is connected to the linkway to The Exchange TRX shopping mall.

Kajang Line and Putrajaya Line station
Entrance	Location	Destination	Picture
A	Jalan Delima	MRT Plaza Pedestrian walkway to Jalan Delima, Jalan Kamuning, Jalan Inai, The Exchange 106, The Exchange TRX, TRX MRT Link, TSLAW Tower, The Forum Condominium, Wisma Technip, RHB Centre and Menara JCorp	
B	Jalan Tun Razak	Persiaran TRX Timur Feeder bus stop, taxi and kiss and ride lay-by, station access road to Jalan Tun Razak, Tun Razak Entertainment Centre (TREC)	
Underground Entrance	Station Upper Concourse (B2)	Linkway to The Exchange TRX Shopping Mall	

=== Integrated MRT station ===
The platform 4 (Kwasa Damansara-bound) of the TRX station, which serves the Putrajaya Line.

The Tun Razak Exchange station is designed as an interchange station between the MRT Kajang Line and the MRT Putrajaya Line, making it the second interchange between the two lines, the other being Kwasa Damansara. As a result, the Tun Razak Exchange has a stacked island platform configuration to enable cross-platform transfers between the MRT lines. Previously, after the opening of the Kajang Line, the Putrajaya Line platforms were boarded up. As of 16 March 2023, platforms 3 and 4 which serve the Putrajaya Line, are now open to the public.

== History ==
The area in which the station is located was previously occupied by quarters allocated to Government employees. The quarters were demolished, and at the spot where the station is located currently, an arts and craft market was established, with the name "Pasar Rakyat" or "People's Market". Because of this, the working name for the Tun Razak Exchange station was the Pasar Rakyat station.

== Bus services ==
Route No.	Origin	Destination	Via
T407	KG20 PY23 Tun Razak Exchange	Desa Pandan	RHB Bank; Jalan Tun Razak; Jalan Perkasa; Jalan Pria 8 Jalan Wirawati; Jalan Belangkas; Jalan Kampung Pandan; Jalan 1/76; Jalan 4/76
402	KG20 PY23 Tun Razak Exchange	AG3 SP3 MR11 PY17 CC09 Titiwangsa - Pekeliling bus hub	Jalan Tun Razak; KJ9 Ampang Park; PY20 Ampang Park; Jalan Ampang; Kuala Lumpur City Centre; KJ10 KLCC; Jalan Yap Kwan Seng; National Heart Institute (IJN); National Library of Malaysia; Hospital Kuala Lumpur
