= Kampung Pandan =

Village in Federal Territory of Kuala Lumpur

Coordinates: 6°38′N 117°04′E

Kampung Pandan is a village/settlement located in the Titiwangsa constituency in eastern Kuala Lumpur, Malaysia, surrounded by Ampang, Maluri, Pudu and Bukit Bintang. Once a small settlement, Kampung Pandan has now grown and developed tremendously.

It used to be an area of well-planned settlement (with title deed) under Rural Industrial Development Authority (RIDA) to accommodate/ relocate people who were moved from their areas of settlement for development purposes (among the areas was Maxwell Village) in the late 1960s.

Kampung Pandan was developed into two sections of the settlement namely Kampong Pandan Dalam (settlement) and Kampong Pandan Luar (commercial area or locally known as the town area). Along with the development of Kuala Lumpur, the area prospered.

The settlement however saw squatter areas, inhabited by people from other Malaysian states who were looking for job opportunities in the city back in the early 1970s.

More squatter houses were built in the early 1990s as there was demand from illegal immigrants (mostly Indonesian) who worked in various industries especially the emerging commercial development (construction). In the early 2000s, the squatter areas were demolished.

The current residences in Kampung Pandan are part of the original settlement and the houses are changing (renovated/rebuilt)rapidly in terms of their designs while some retained their original design adding a quaint charm to the area.

The village has an elementary school built named Sekolah Rendah Kampong Pandan which was renamed Sekolah Rendah Kebangsaan Tun Hussein Onn.

Among famous landmarks in Kampung Pandan is the Mokhtar Dahari Community Square or Dataran Komuniti Mokhtar Dahari, a community square named after the famous Malaysian footballer he used to live in Kampung Pandan and played football here.

== Public transportation ==
RapidKL bus T407 connects some areas in Kampung Pandan to Tun Razak Exchange MRT station.

== Educational institutions ==
- SMART College
- Security Plus Academy
- SMK St. Gabriel
- Tsun Jin Primary School
- SMK Aminuddin Baki
- Institut Kemahiran Mara (IKM) Kuala Lumpur
- SMK Datok Lokman
- Taylor's International School Kuala Lumpur (formerly known as Sekolah Sri Garden)
- SMK Taman Maluri

== Sports and recreation ==
- Malaysia Paralympic Sports Excellence Centre (Malay: Pusat Kecemerlangan Sukan Paralimpik Malaysia, MPSEC or PKSPM) - Headquarters of the Paralympic Council of Malaysia (PCM).

== See also ==
- Kampung Padang Balang
- Masjid Nurul Hidayah
