= Section 14 =

Section 14 may refer to:

- Public Order Act 1986
- Section 14 of the Canadian Charter of Rights and Freedoms
- Dato' Menteri LRT station, Malaysia
