= I-City =

Urban development in Malaysia

i-City
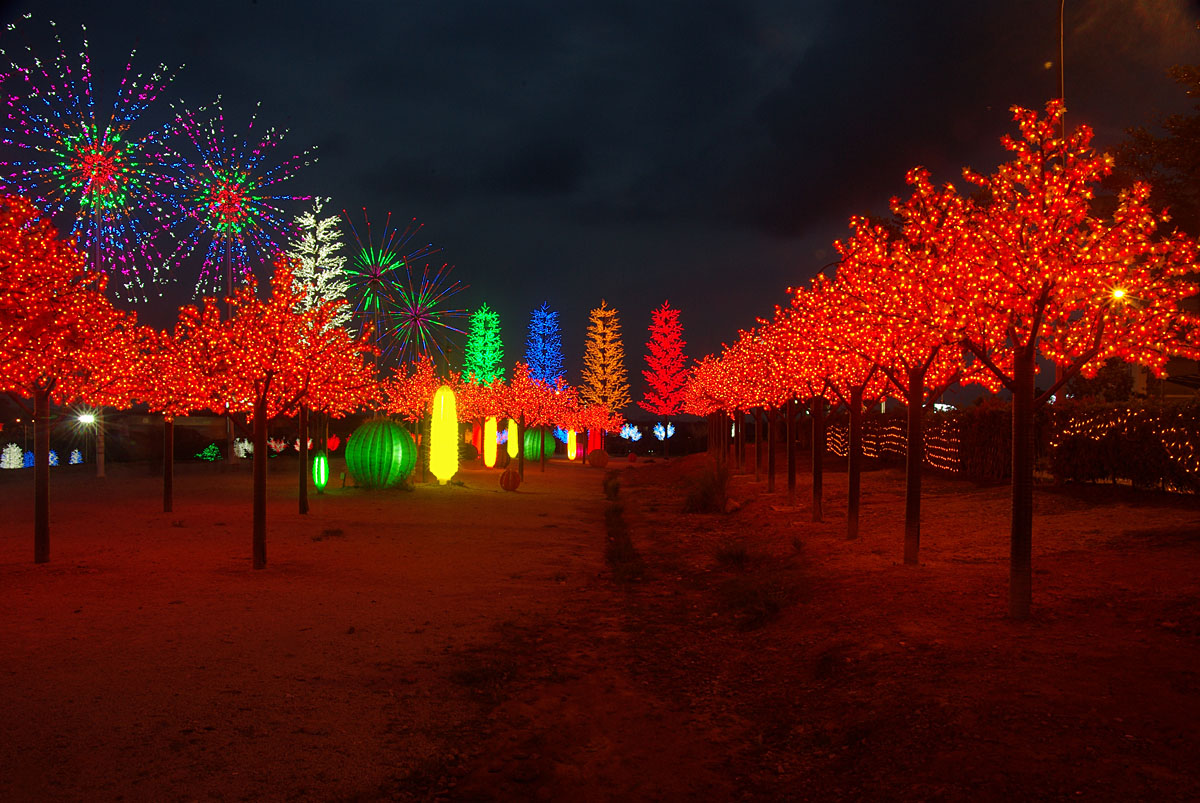
- i-City's City of Digital Lights
- Interactive map of i-City
- Status: Operating
- Area: 29.16 ha (72.1 acres)
- Coordinates: 3.065954°N 101.483355°E
- Opened: January 3, 2002

i-City is a 72 acres (29 ha) ICT-based urban development beside the Federal Highway in Section 7, Shah Alam, Selangor, Malaysia. Planned by architect Jon A. Jerde, i-City was designed as a fully integrated intelligent city, comprising corporate, leisure and residential components such as a one-million-square-foot (93×10^{3} m^{2}) regional shopping mall, office towers, Cybercentre office suites, hotels, apartments, data centers, and an innovation center.

i-City is an MSC Malaysia Cybercentre where knowledge-based companies with MSC Malaysia status can exploit the various incentives offered under the MSC Malaysia Bills of Guarantee. It has also been endorsed as a tourism destination by the Ministry of Tourism and declared as an International Park by the Selangor State Government. Such venues allow for entertainment and other cosmopolitan lifestyle outlets to operate on a 24-7 basis.

i-City gross development value has increased to MYR 10 billion project from MYR 1.5 billion in 2002.

== Overview ==
i-City plans to be a business location for six industry clusters, namely shared services and outsourcing, biotechnology, software development, as a media hub, an Islamic financial hub, and a data centre.

=== Landmark ===
Jewel i-City, is a 381 m (1,250 ft) proposed supertall skyscraper in Shah Alam, Selangor, Malaysia. It is the centerpiece and the landmark of the project. It would stand at a height of 381 m (1,250 ft). It will surpass the previous record holder, Central Offices Tower 2, the tallest building in Shah Alam as of today, when completed.

Jewel i-City
- Menara Jewel i-City
- Interactive map of the Jewel i-City area
- Former names: i-City Tower

General information
- Status: Vision
- Type: Office/Hotel
- Architectural style: Neo-futurism
- Location: i-City, Federal Highway, 40000 Shah Alam, Selangor, Malaysia
- Coordinates: 3°03′51″N 101°29′07″E
- Estimated completion: 2025
- Owner: Tan Sri Lim Kim Hong

Height
- Architectural: 381 m (1,250 ft)
- Roof: 381 m (1,250 ft)
- Top floor: 373 m (1,224 ft)

Technical details
- Structural system: Steel; Reinforced concrete
- Floor count: 73

Design and construction
- Developer: Tan Sri Lim Kim Hong

=== Buildings ===
Within i-City, CityPark is the designated building to house MSC Malaysia-status companies. CityPark consists of 6 blocks and has a total office space of more than 300,000 sq ft (28,000 m^{2}). The entire i-City development features eight corporate office towers, two luxury hotels, two blocks of 24-story residences, three and five story shop-offices, and retail suites.

==== Hotels ====
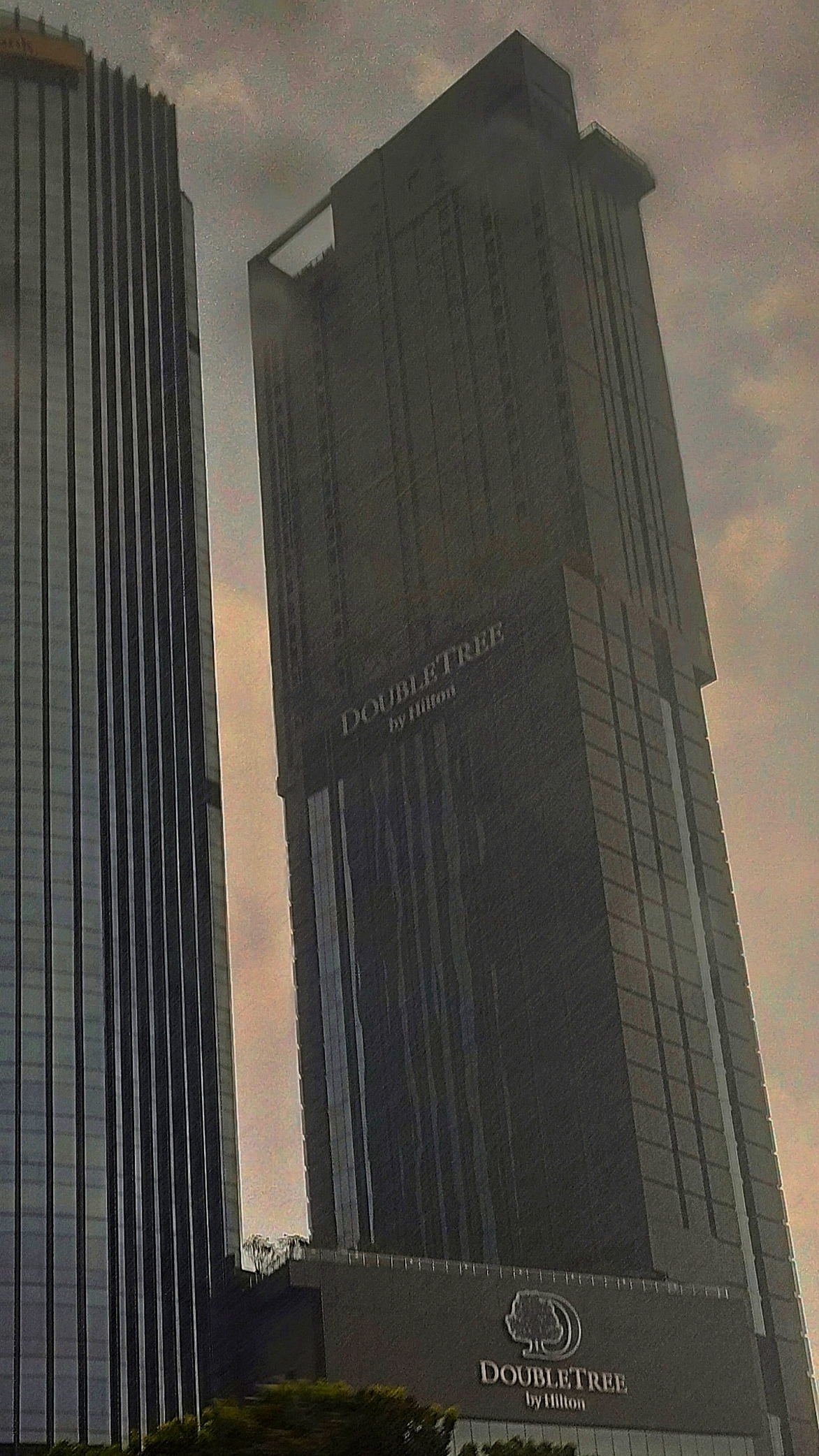
DoubleTree by Hilton i-City as seen from the Federal Highway

As of December 2019, Best Western International is currently operating the three-star Best Western i-City hotel while in 2020, Hilton Worldwide Group will operate the four-star DoubleTree by Hilton i-City.

==== Shopping Mall ====
Central i-City shopping centre is a joint venture project between Thai outfit Central Pattana Public Company Limited (CPN) and i-City Properties Sdn Bhd. The shopping centre costs RM 850 million. Spanning 940,000 sq ft (87,000 m^{2}) over 350 retail stores across six levels, the shopping centre is the largest in Shah Alam. The shopping mall had its soft opening on 23 March 2019 and was officially launched by Sultan of Selangor Sultan Sharafuddin Idris Shah on 15 June 2019.

=== Data Centre ===
i-City has launched their Data Centre Park, which aims to be one of the largest data centre space providers in a single location in Malaysia. The Data Centre Park is designed for data centre service providers and large companies who plan to build their own data centre buildings. The park has the capacity to host up to four centres with a combined floor space of 200,000 sq ft (19,000 m^{2}).

== City of Digital Lights ==
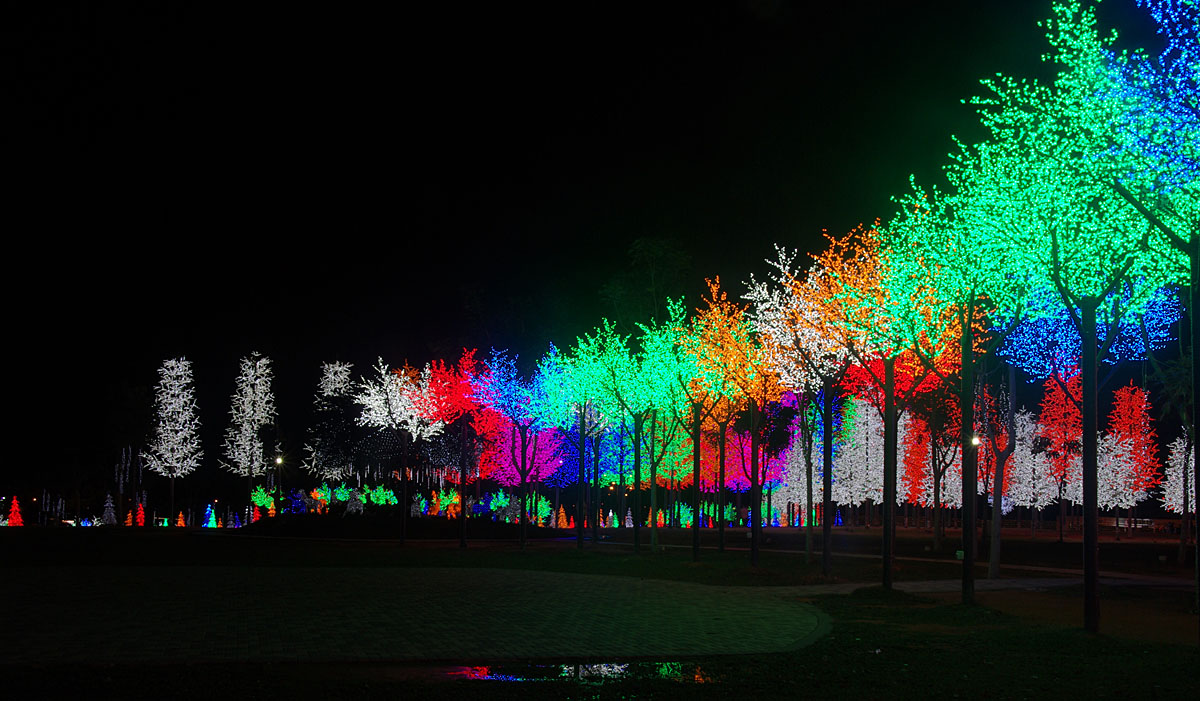
I-City Park at night

=== Snowalk ===
SnoWalk is a 50,000 sq ft (4,600 m^{2}) arctic environment attraction with 100 tons of ice sculptures that were shaped by a team of 30 ice sculptors from Harbin, China. With temperatures below 5 °C (41 °F) and 100 mm (3.9 in) of snow on the ground, SnoWalk is a family leisure attraction.

=== Waterworld ===
WaterWorld at i-City features water rides and games. The main attraction consists of vortex water ride from a steep 160 ft (49 m) launch tower and water slides.

=== Red Carpet 2 ===
Red Carpet 2 was Malaysia's first home-grown interactive wax museum. Measuring up to 30,000 sq ft (2,800 m^{2}), Red Carpet 2 allows visitors to take a selfie with figures such as The Avengers Superheroes, Royals, Head of States, Sci-fi, Tech Giants like Jack Ma and Mark Zuckerberg, Corporate Movers, MTV, Outer Space, Magical World, K-pop (Hallyu), Canto pop, Oscars, A-List artistes and so on.

=== Events ===
i-City has hosted various large-scale events and programmes, such as Malaysia's Independence Day Celebration on 31 August and the Mid-Autumn Festival. During the 2010 World Cup, i-City also showed the matches live from Johannesburg on its 6.5 m × 8.5 m (21 ft × 28 ft) video wall, the largest video screen in Southeast Asia. It has also hosted MTV World Stage Live in Malaysia, in July 2011.

=== Miscellaneous ===
"True Discovery" is a reptile exhibition located behind Old Town White Coffee Shop. It houses a reptile collection as well as exotic animals like snakes and tarantulas. Among its attractions is a two headed terrapin.

== Transit ==
i-City is connected by the LRT Shah Alam line via the Seksyen 7 Shah Alam LRT station through the 300 m walk, which was opened on 29 June 2026. The nearest gate from LRT station is to WaterWorld i-City water park.

In addition to LRT, the nearest KTM Komuter station to i-City is the Padang Jawa station, on the Tanjung Malim–Port Klang Line. The station is a 10-minute drive from i-City.

Central i-City shopping mall used to provide shuttle buses connecting the mall to Padang Jawa KTM station at half-hourly intervals. However, the free shuttle service was discontinued in 2020; thus, the only access from Padang Jawa KTM station to i-City is via Smart Selangor Bus SA04. The SA04 bus may not enter Padang Jawa KTM station due to congestion near the school and Sunday market.

== Accolades ==
- In 2017, i-City was named one of the world's top 25 brightest and most colourful places by CNN Travel.
