= Stadium Shah Alam LRT station =

Light rapid transit station in Selangor, Malaysia

SA10 Stadium Shah Alam
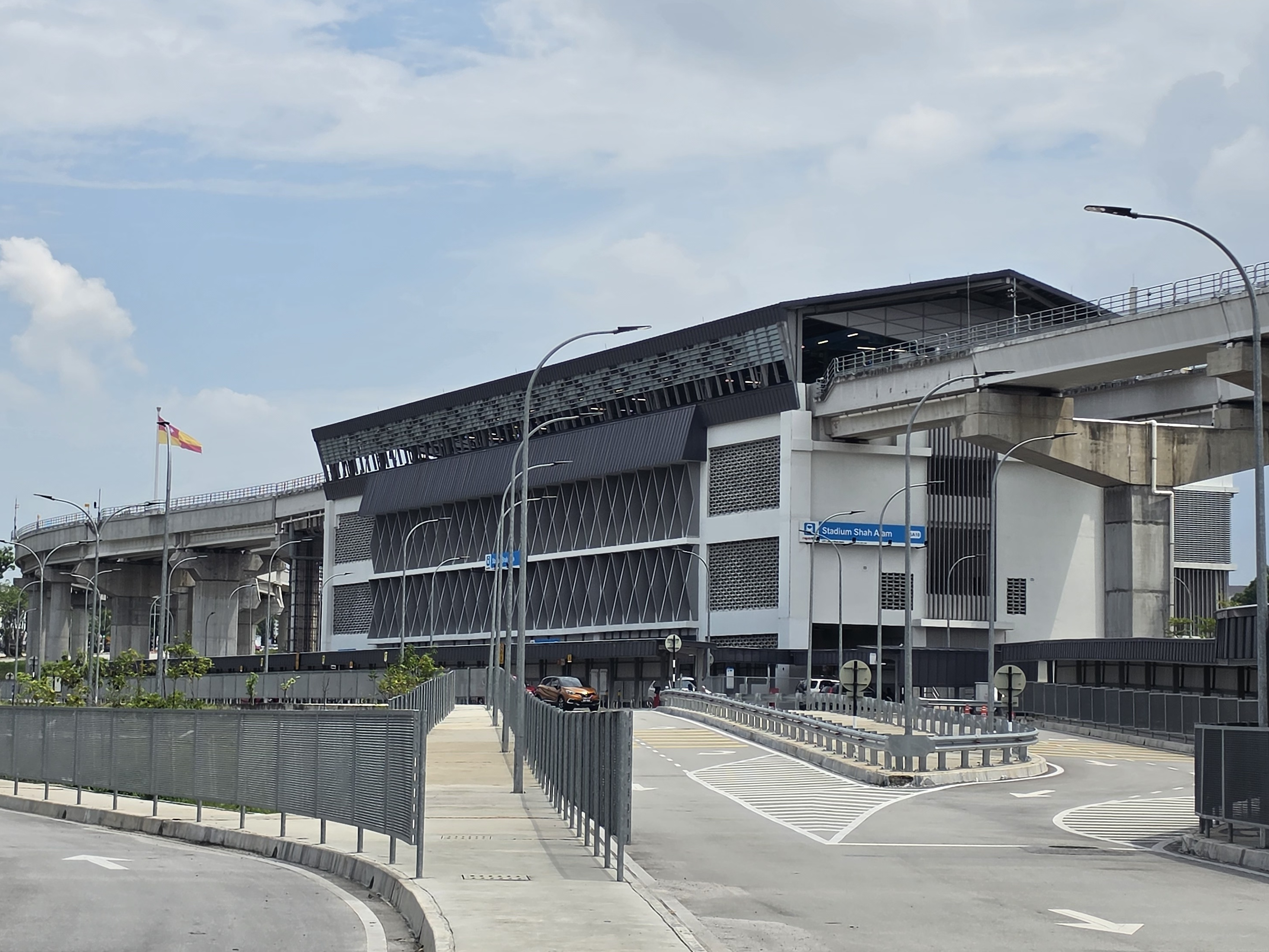

General information
- Other names: Malay: ستاديوم شاه عالم (Jawi); Chinese: 莎阿南体育场; Tamil: ஸ்டேடியம் சா ஆலாம்
- Location: Section 13, Shah Alam, Selangor; Malaysia
- System: Rapid KL
- Owner: Prasarana Malaysia
- Operator: Rapid Rail
- Line: 11 Shah Alam Line
- Platforms: 1 island platform
- Tracks: 2

Construction
- Structure type: Elevated
- Parking: Available
- Accessible: Yes

Other information
- Station code: SA10

History
- Opened: 29 June 2026; 4 months ago

Services
Preceding station		Following station
Kerjaya towards Bandar Utama	Shah Alam Line	Dato Menteri towards Johan Setia
Location

The Stadium Shah Alam LRT station is a light rapid transit (LRT) station that serves the suburb of Section 13 of Shah Alam in Selangor, Malaysia. It serves as one of the stations on the Shah Alam line. The station is located near Shah Alam Stadium car park. The station features a unique design theme as compared to the other stations on the line, bringing a more sports-themed surrounding, and is the main point of access to the upcoming reconstruction of the Shah Alam Stadium into the Shah Alam Sports Complex (Malay: Kompleks Sukan Shah Alam, KSSA), Management and Science University (MSU) campus, and AEON Mall Shah Alam.

== Surrounding Areas ==
This station is located close to Persiaran Sukan, one of the main roads serving Section 13 of Shah Alam. To the southwest of the station is Jalan Lontar Peluru 13/39. Persiaran Akuatik is to the south, and Jalan Subang is to the northeast. Major landmarks around this station include:

- KD10 Batu Tiga Komuter station
- Shah Alam Stadium
- Malawati Stadium
- AEON Mall Shah Alam
- Giant Hypermarket Malaysia headquarters
- Management & Science University (MSU)
- TTDI Sentralis
- IJN-SelGate Specialist Hospital
- Kondominium Indah Alam
- Menara U Apartment
- Arte Subang West Residential
- Pangsapuri Perdana
- Prima U1 Condominium

== History ==
This is the tenth station along the RM9 billion line project, with the line's maintenance depot in Johan Setia, Klang. The LRT station was opened in 29 June 2026 along with 19 other stations. It has facilities such as kiosks, restrooms, elevators, taxi stands, and feeder buses. An eleventh station, Persiaran Hishamuddin, was planned to be constructed between this station and Dato' Menteri, as the first underground station outside Kuala Lumpur. However, as a cost-cutting measure, and due to the low population in the station's catchment area, Persiaran Hishamuddin station's construction was cancelled and the site was converted into a tunnel ventilation control area.

== Station features ==
This is an elevated station with three floors. There is one island platform on the second floor, the concourse on the first floor, and three entrances/exits on the ground floor. There are also facilities designed for the disabled, including tactile paving, disabled toilets, braille on elevator buttons, and low-height elevator buttons and customer service centre counters for wheelchair users. Car park is available near the station, operated by Rantaian Mesra Sdn. Bhd.

As this station is designed to serve the future Shah Alam Sports Complex, the interior of the stations, particularly the floors, are designed with graphical decorations resembling a running track, basketball court, and badminton court.

The floor where the faregates are situated has a decoration resembling a badminton court.

=== Station layout ===
L2
Platform

Level

→ Platform 1: 11 Shah Alam Line towards SA01 Bandar Utama (Kerjaya)
Island platform, doors open on the right
← Platform 2: 11 Shah Alam Line towards SA26 Johan Setia (Dato' Menteri)
L1
Concourse
Faregates to paid area, escalators, lifts, ticketing machines, customer service counter
G
Ground Level
Feeder Bus Stop, Taxi Lay-By

=== Exits and entrances ===
This station has three entrances and exits. Entrances A and B are at the south of the station, serving as the waiting area for buses, taxis, e-hailing, and private vehicle pick-up. Entrance C serves as the access point for the future Shah Alam Sports Complex. Although there is no signage indicating this is an entrance, it is an open area that passengers can use to enter and exit the station.

Shah Alam Line station
Entrance	Location	Destination	Picture
A	Shah Alam Sports Complex	Shah Alam Sports Complex, Emira Residences, Aeon Mall Shah Alam, Management and Science University (MSU), Menara U	
B	Shah Alam Sports Complex	Shah Alam Sports Complex, Emira Residences, Aeon Mall Shah Alam, Management and Science University (MSU), Menara U	
C	Shah Alam Sports Complex	Shah Alam Sports Complex, Rantaian Mesra Carpark, TTDI Sentralis, Giant Hypermarket Section 13	

== Bus Services ==
Route No.	Origin	Destination	Via	Connecting to	Notes
754	SA10 Stadium Shah Alam	UiTM Puncak Perdana	Persiaran Sukan; Jalan Montfort; Persiaran Tebar Layar; Persiaran Mokhtar Dahari; Persiaran Pulau Carey; Jalan Pulau Angsa U10/2; Jalan Ungu U9/33	SA02; SA05	
SA02	Hentian Bandar Seksyen 14	KTM Batu Tiga	Persiaran Perbandaran; Persiaran Dato Menteri; Persiaran Sukan ( SA10 Stadium Shah Alam); Persiaran Kerjaya	754; SA05; KD10 KTM Batu Tiga	
SA05	SA10 Stadium Shah Alam	Bukit Jelutong	Persiaran Sukan; Jalan Monfort; Jalan Sasterawan (TTDI Jaya); Jalan Kuvik U8/82 (Space U8); Persiaran Gerbang Utama	754; SA02; SA10	

Rapid On-Demand (ROD) services to Shah Alam Section 13 are also available.

== Gallery ==
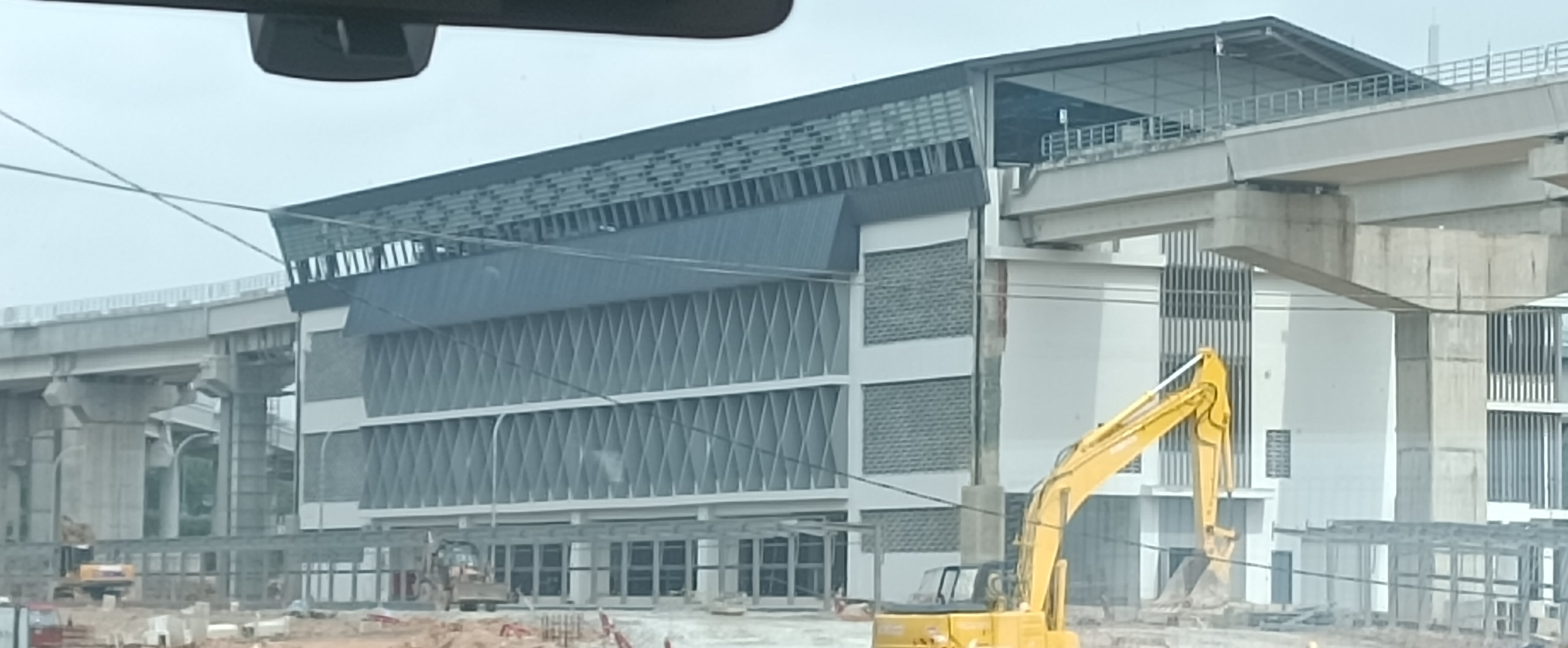
The station under construction in 2024

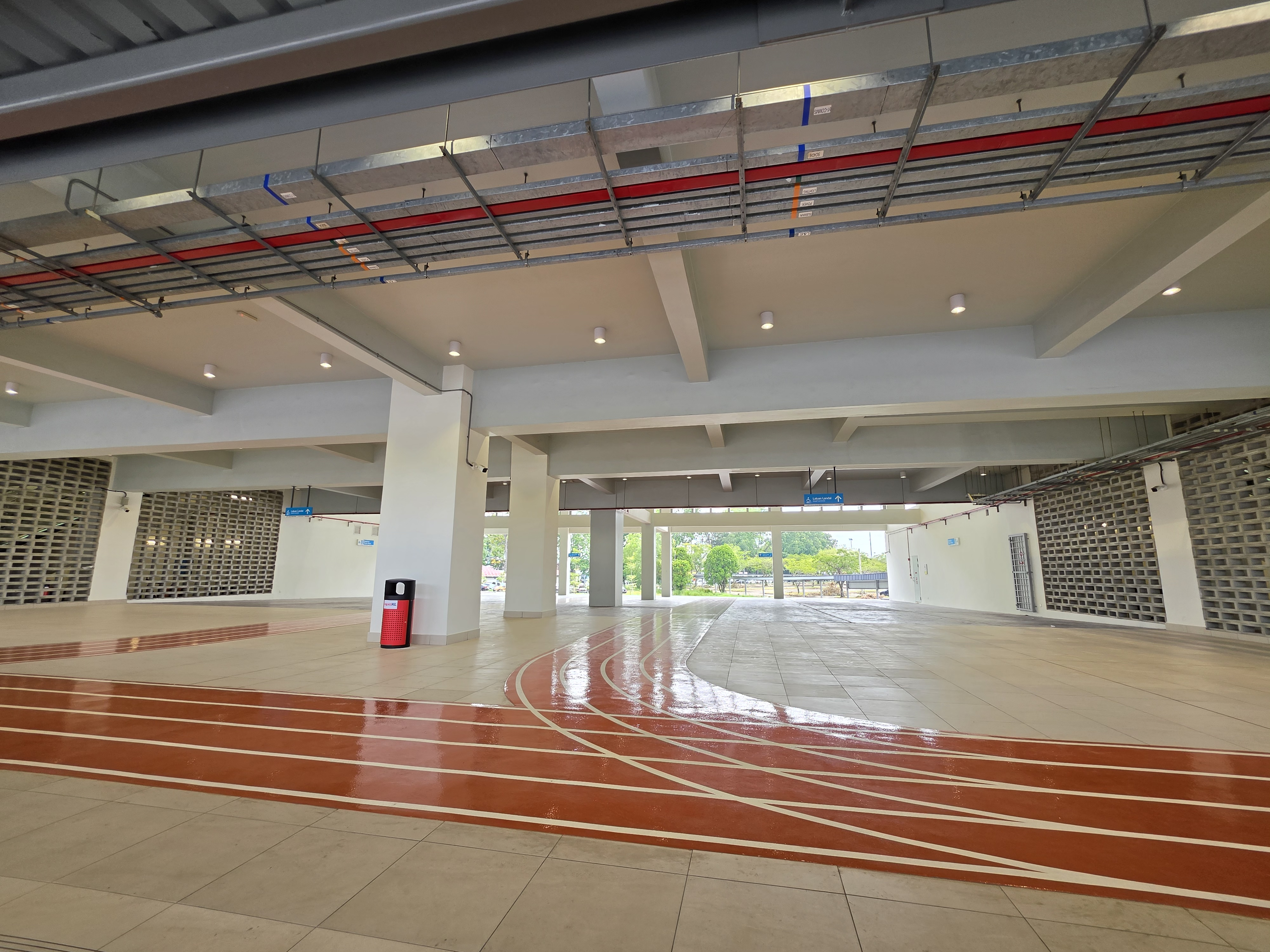
The station's ground floor entrance

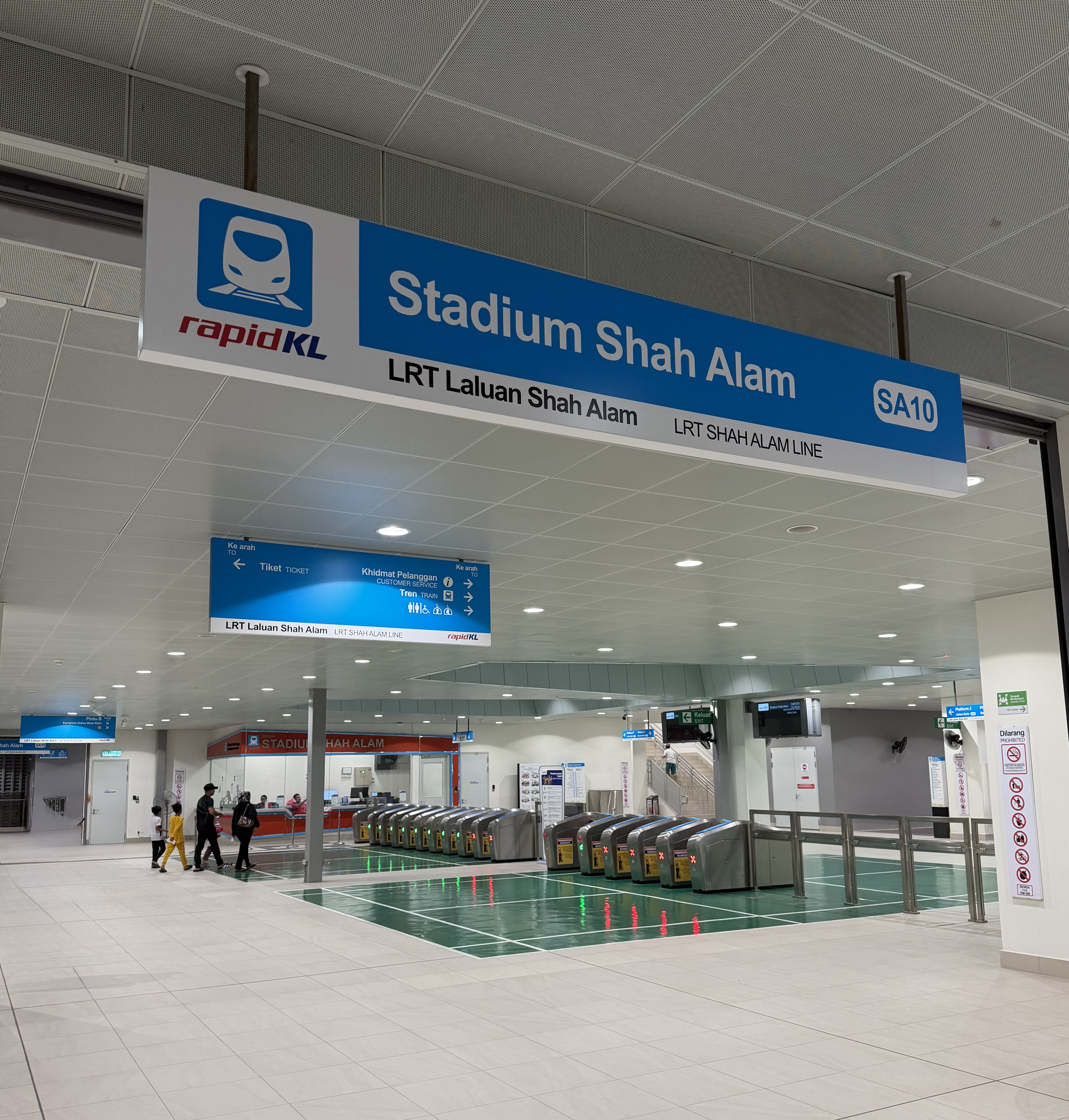
The station's concourse view from the left-side escalator entrance

The station's concourse

Platforms 1 and 2
