= Central i-City =

Shopping mall in Shah Alam, Selangor, Malaysia

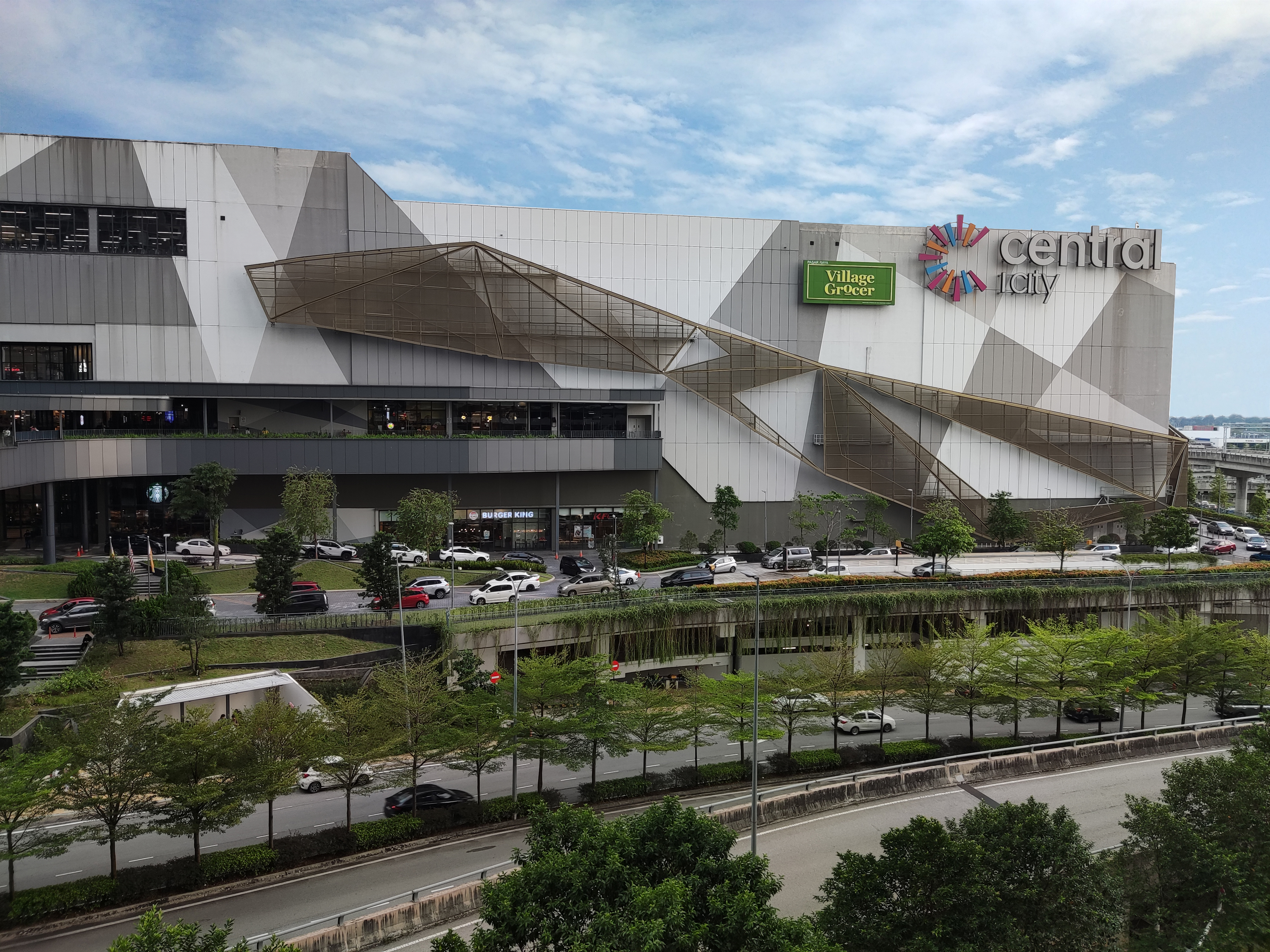
- Location: i-City, Shah Alam, Selangor; Malaysia
- Coordinates: 3°3′44.1″N 101°28′54.2″E
- Address: No. 1, i-City, Persiaran Multimedia, Seksyen 7, 40000 Shah Alam
- Opened: 15 June 2019
- Developer: Central Pattana i-City Properties Sdn Bhd
- Architect: SAA Group Architects
- Num. of stores: 365
- Num. of anchor tenants: 3
- Floor area: 926,000 sq ft (86,000 m^{2})
- Floors: 6
- Parking: 3,000
- Public transit: SA15 Seksyen 7 Shah Alam
- Website: central-icity.com.my

Central i-City is a shopping mall located in i-City, Shah Alam, Selangor, Malaysia. The mall is a joint venture project between Thailand’s largest retail property developer Central Pattana PCL (CPN), with a 60 per cent stake, and i-City Properties Sdn Bhd (ICP), an affiliate of i-Berhad that holds 40 per cent. Central i-City is CPN's first international mall.

As of November 2019, the mall is the largest in Shah Alam in terms of floor area and recorded footfall of about 800,000 a month. The mall also houses the largest Samsung Onyx LED cinema screen in Southeast Asia.

== History ==
The construction of the shopping mall started in January 2016. It was initially named CentralPlaza@i-City. The mall spans 1.5 million sq ft of gross floor area, with gross development value (GDV) of RM 850 million.

The mall was expected to be opened in August 2018. It had its soft opening on 23 March 2019, and was officially opened by the Sultan of Selangor, HRH Sultan Sharafuddin Idris Shah on 15 June 2019.

== Tenants ==
Anchor tenants

- Sogo Department Store
- TGV Cinemas
- Village Grocer

Junior tenants

- Ace Hardware
- ALL IT Hypermarket
- Brands Outlet
- Food Empire
- GoFit (Note: The first GoFit club in the world)
- Manekineko Malaysia
- Padini Concept Store
- Palace 8 Restaurant
- The Parenthood
- Popular
- Sports Direct
- TBM
- UNIQLO

== Access ==
=== Rail ===
The mall is connected to the SA15 Seksyen 7 Shah Alam LRT station via a 750m walk from the station (through i-City walk), and is opened on 29 June 2026 after multiple delays. The SmartSelangor MBSA bus route SA04 is also provided for mall customers travelling to and from the KD12 Padang Jawa KTM and the aforementioned Seksyen 7 Shah Alam LRT stations, UiTM Shah Alam campus and Seksyen 17 Bus Terminal. Commuters can also take the Rapid KL Demand Responsive Transit (Rapid on-Demand) from the LRT station to the mall under the Seksyen 7 - Padang Jawa zone.

=== Road ===
The mall is accessible via the Federal Highway and North Klang Straits Bypass.
