= UiTM Shah Alam LRT station =

Metro station in Malaysia

SA14 UiTM Shah Alam
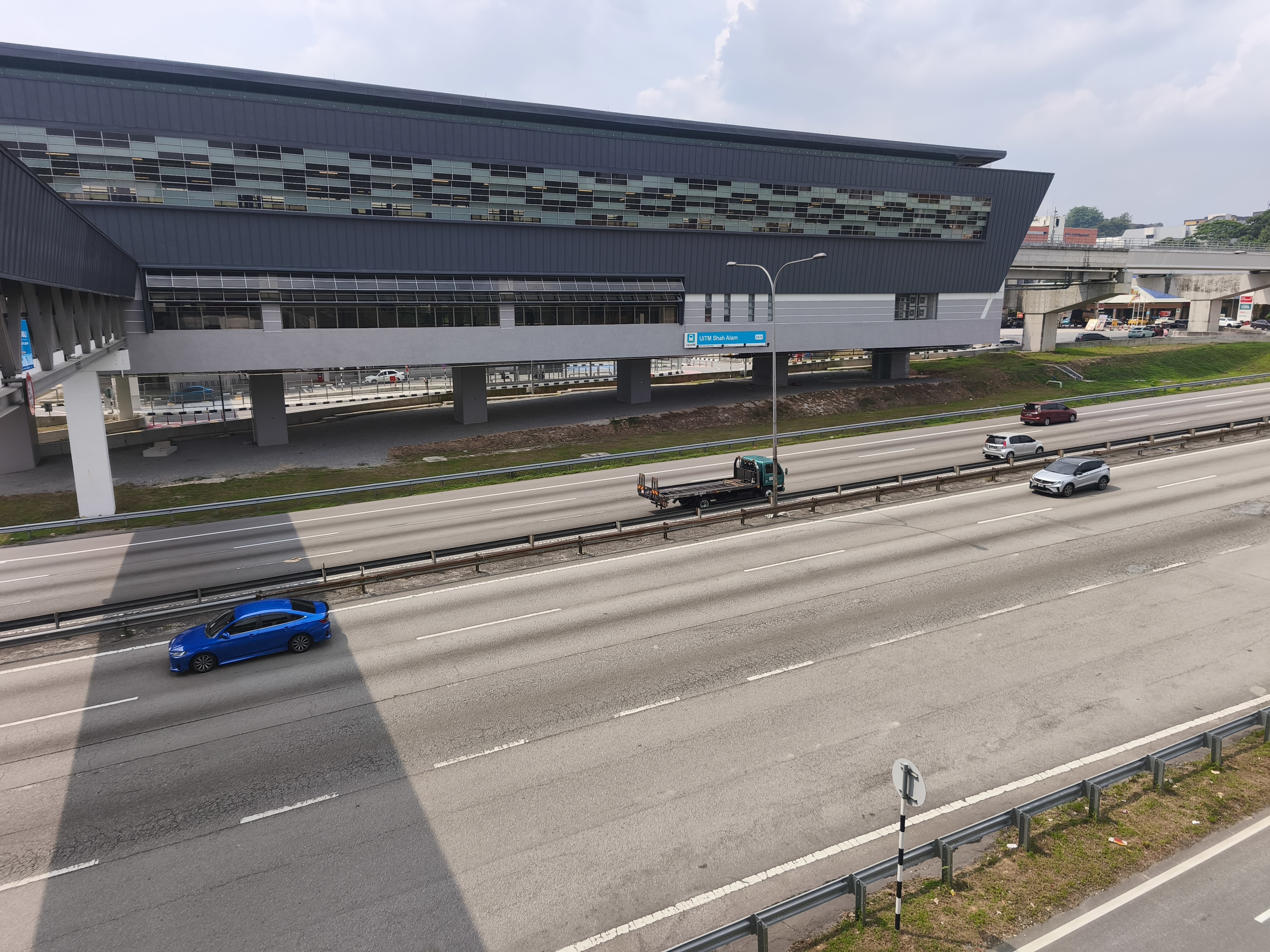

General information
- Other names: Malay: يو.اءي.تي.عيم. شاه عالم (Jawi); Chinese: 莎阿南玛拉工艺大学; Tamil: யூஐடிஎம் சா ஆலாம்
- Location: Universiti Teknologi MARA, Federal Highway, Section 1, 40450 Shah Alam, Selangor; Malaysia
- System: Rapid KL
- Owner: Prasarana Malaysia
- Operator: Rapid Rail
- Line: 11 Shah Alam Line
- Platforms: 1 island platform
- Tracks: 2

Construction
- Structure type: Elevated
- Parking: Not available
- Cycle facilities: Not available
- Accessible: Yes

Other information
- Status: Operational
- Station code: SA14

History
- Opened: 29 June 2026; 4 months ago
- Former names: UiTM

Services
Preceding station		Following station
Dato Menteri towards Bandar Utama	Shah Alam Line	Seksyen 7 Shah Alam towards Johan Setia
Raja Muda towards Bandar Utama	Shah Alam Line Future service (2031)	Seksyen 7 Shah Alam towards Johan Setia
Location

The UiTM Shah Alam LRT station is a elevated light rapid transit (LRT) station that mainly serves the Universiti Teknologi MARA (UiTM) campus and Section 16 areas of Shah Alam, Selangor, Malaysia. The station is an elevated rapid transit station served on the Shah Alam line and forms part of the Klang Valley Integrated Transit System.

This is the fourteenth station along the RM9 billion line project, with the line's maintenance depot located in Johan Setia, Klang. This LRT station was opened in 29 June 2026 along with other 19 stations. It has facilities such as kiosks, restrooms, elevators, taxi stands, and feeder buses.

== Locality landmarks ==
The station is located on the northern side near the Federal Highway (part of the Federal Route 2) between the Petronas and Shell petrol stations. This station serves Sections 1 and 16 of Shah Alam, to the north and south of the station, respectively. Major landmarks around the station include:

- Universiti Teknologi MARA (UiTM) Shah Alam campus, including:
  - Dewan Agong Tuanku Canselor (DATC)
  - UiTM Graduate Institute (IPSis, AAGSB)
  - UiTM-MTDC
  - UiTM Residential Colleges (Kenanga, Perindu, Cempaka)
  - UiTM Faculties (Law, Applied Sciences, Business, Built Environment)
  - UiTM Stadium
- Kompleks Perumahan Kerajaan Selangor Seksyen 16
- Flat PKNS Seksyen 16

== Station Features ==
The station adopts the standard elevated station design for the Shah Alam Line, with one island platform above the concourse level and two entrances/exits on the ground level, below the concourse. There are also facilities designed for the disabled, including tactile paving, disabled toilets, braille on elevator buttons, and low-height elevator buttons and customer service centre counters for wheelchair users.

=== Station layout ===
L2	Platform; Level	→ Platform 1: 11 Shah Alam Line towards SA01 Bandar Utama (Dato' Menteri)
L2	Platform; Level	Island platform, doors open on the right
L2	Platform; Level	← Platform 2: 11 Shah Alam Line towards SA26 Johan Setia (Seksyen 7 Shah Alam)
L1	Concourse	Faregates to paid area, escalators, lifts, ticketing machines, customer service counter
G	Ground Level	Feeder Bus Stop (Entrance B), Taxi Lay-By

=== Exits and entrances ===
The station has two entrances. Entrance A is situated on the northern side of the Federal Highway and connects commuters to the nearby petrol stations, as well as into the UiTM campus through a dedicated walkway. Entrance B is situated across the Federal Highway and connects commuters towards Section 16 of the city.

Shah Alam Line station
Entrance	Location	Destination	Picture
A	UiTM Shah Alam	Taxi and private vehicle lay-by UiTM Shah Alam; Dewan Agung Tuanku Canselor; Shell dan Petronas petrol stations	
B	Seksyen 16	Feeder bus stop, taxi and private vehicle lay-by Persiaran Selangor; Kompleks Perumahan Kerajaan Selangor Sekysen 16; Flat PKNS Seksyen 16; Masjid Jamek Raja Tun Uda	

== Bus Services ==
=== Feeder buses ===
	Origin	Destination	Via	Connecting to	Notes
T764	SA14 UiTM Shah Alam Pintu B	Seksyen 24 Shah Alam	Persiaran Selangor; Persiaran Raja Muda; Jalan Pinang 18/1; Persiaran Jubli Perak; Jalan Timun 24/1		

=== Other buses ===
	Origin	Destination	Via	Connecting to	Notes
SA04	Terminal 17 Shah Alam	Hospital Shah Alam	i-City Padang Jawa SA14 UiTM Shah Alam Pintu B		

Currently this area is served by Smart Selangor bus route SA04 (to i-City & Padang Jawa) and feeder bus T764 (to Seksyen 24).

In addition, Rapid On-Demand feeder vans are also available, serving Padang Jawa KTM and Seksyen 17 Bus Terminal.

== Gallery ==
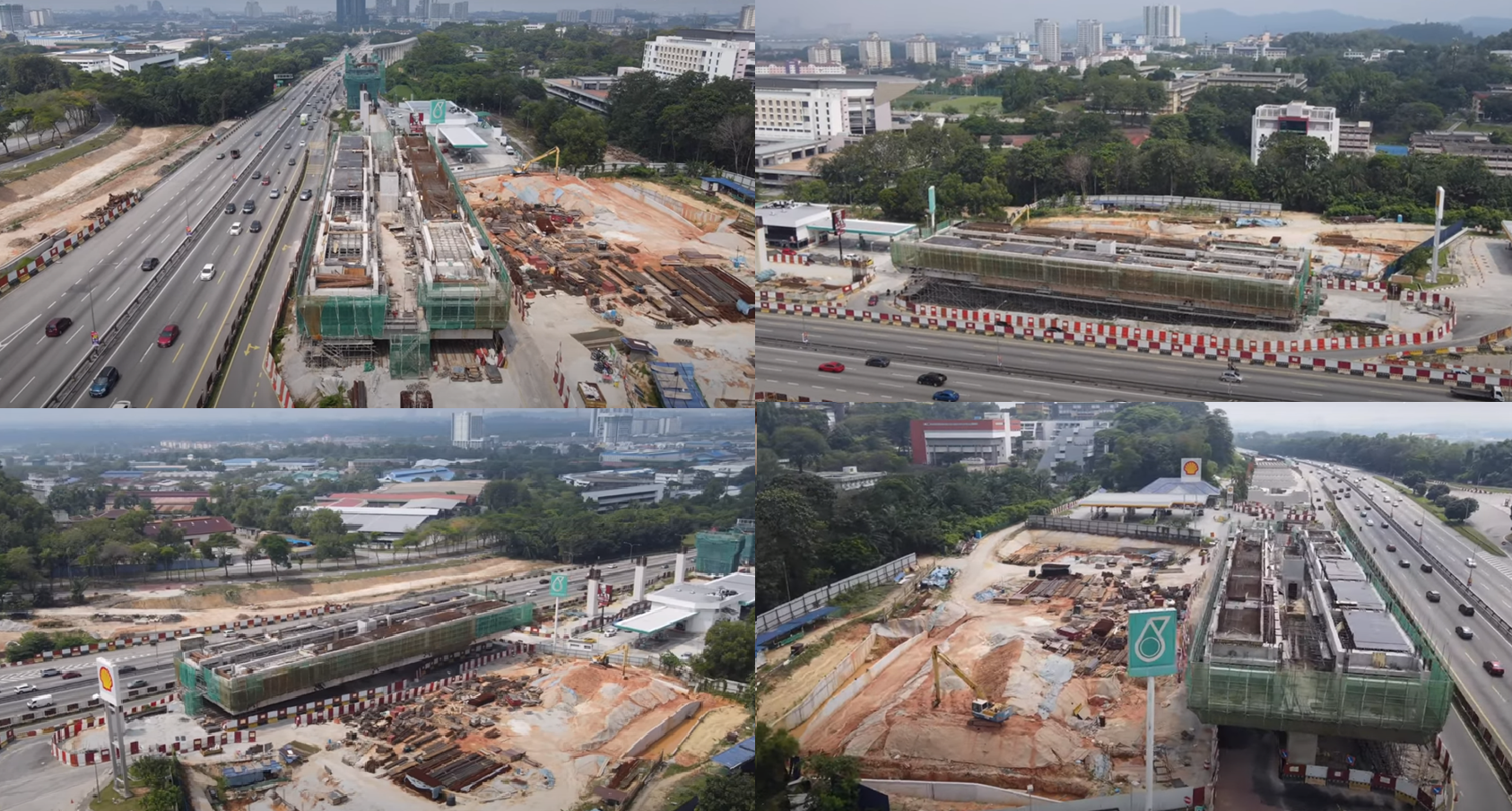
Compilation views of the station under construction in 2022

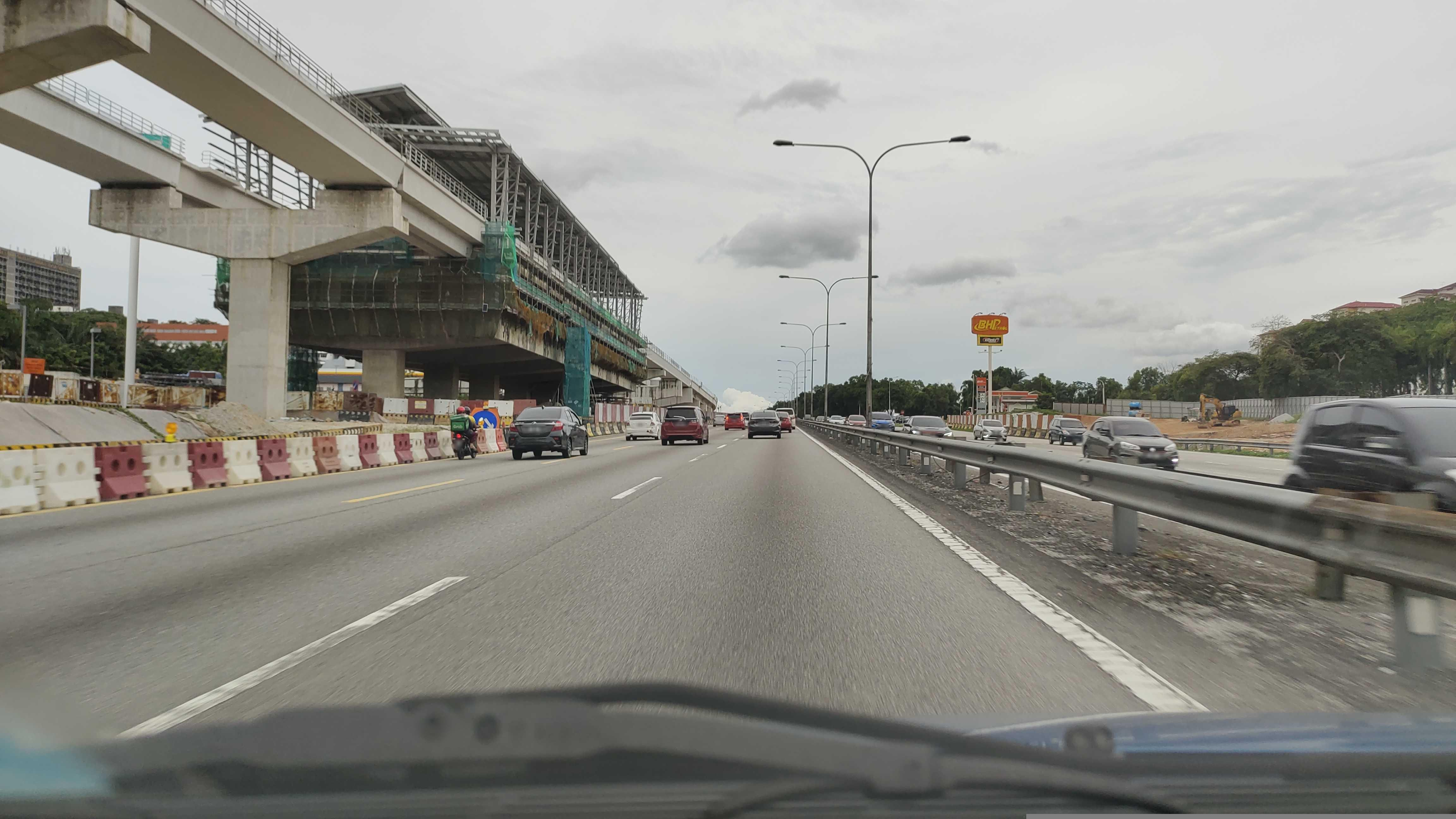
View of the Federal Highway and the station under construction in 2023

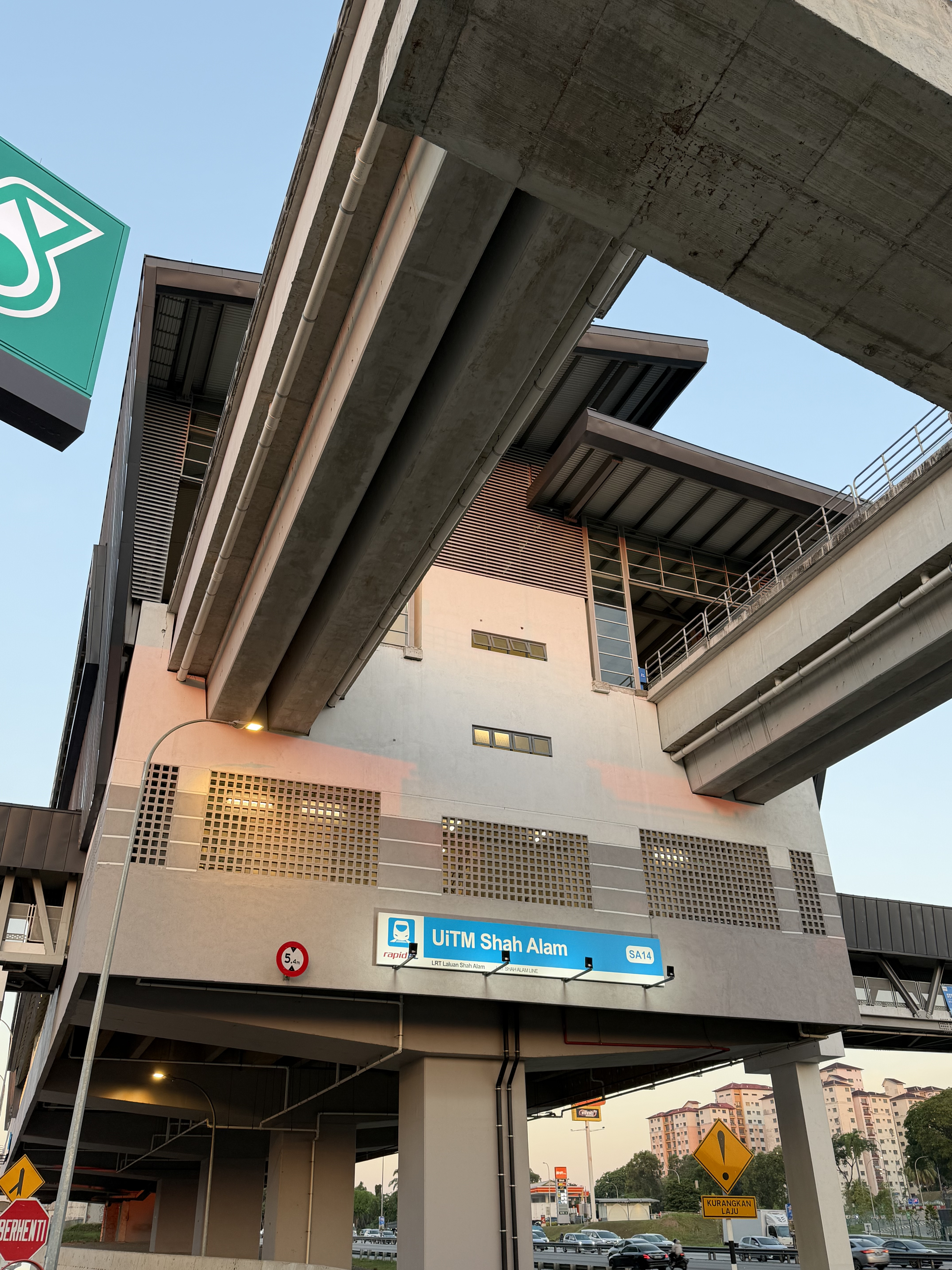
Low-angle perspective view of the station from the Petronas layby

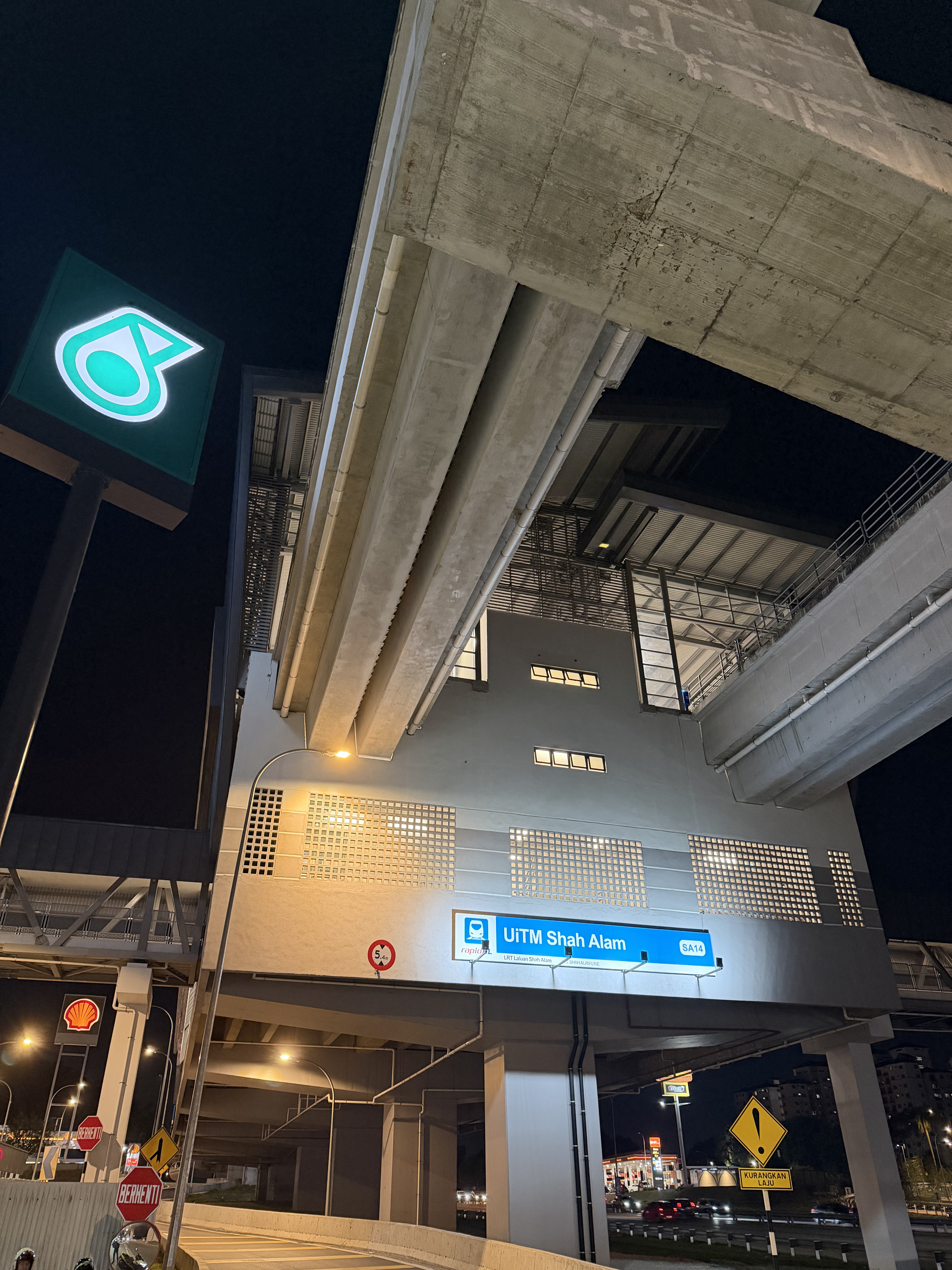
Low-angle perspective view of the station at night from the Petronas layby

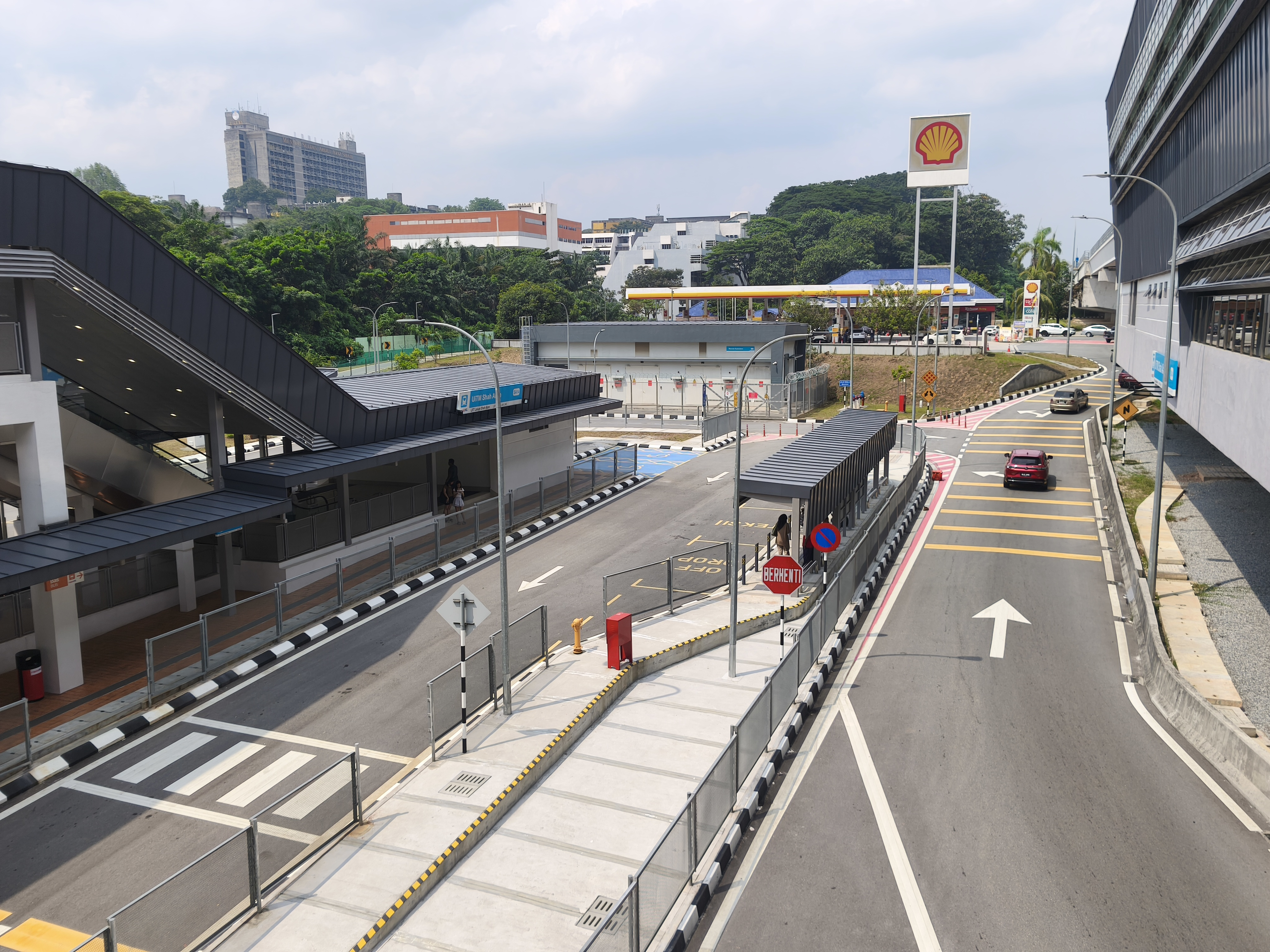
View of the surrounding Entrance A area

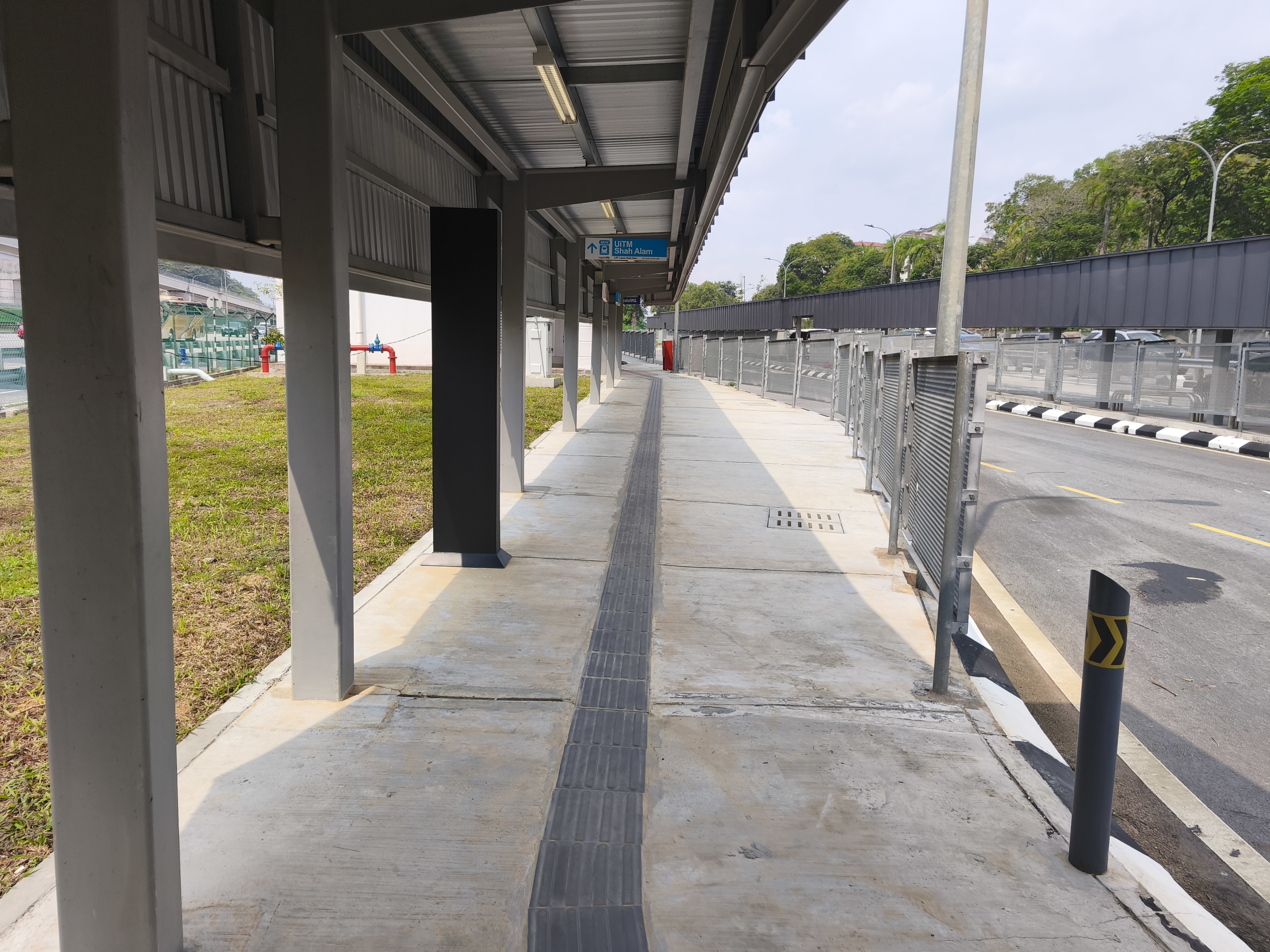
View of the bus layby at Entrance B

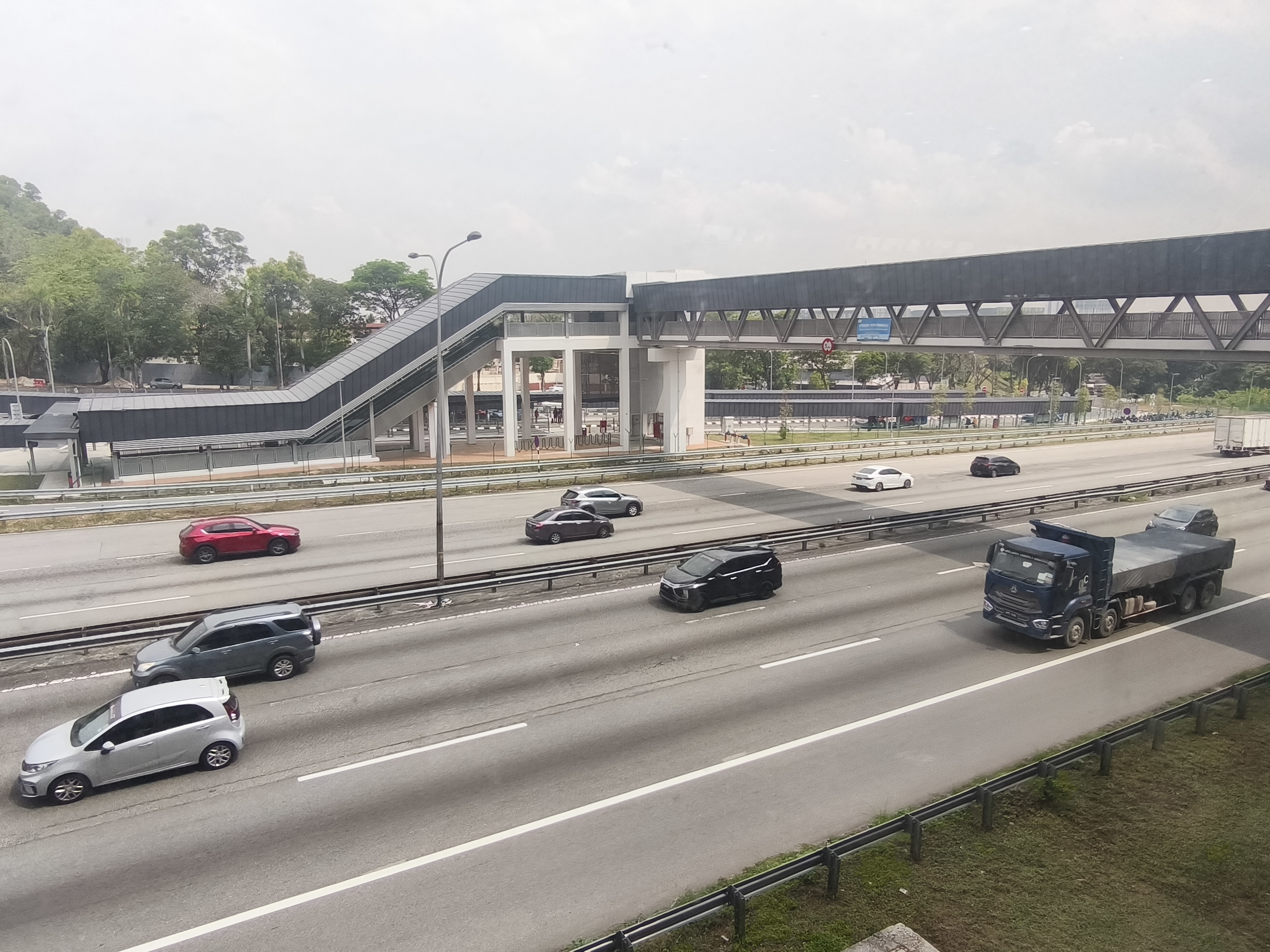
View of the pedestrian linkbridge from Entrance B across the Federal Highway

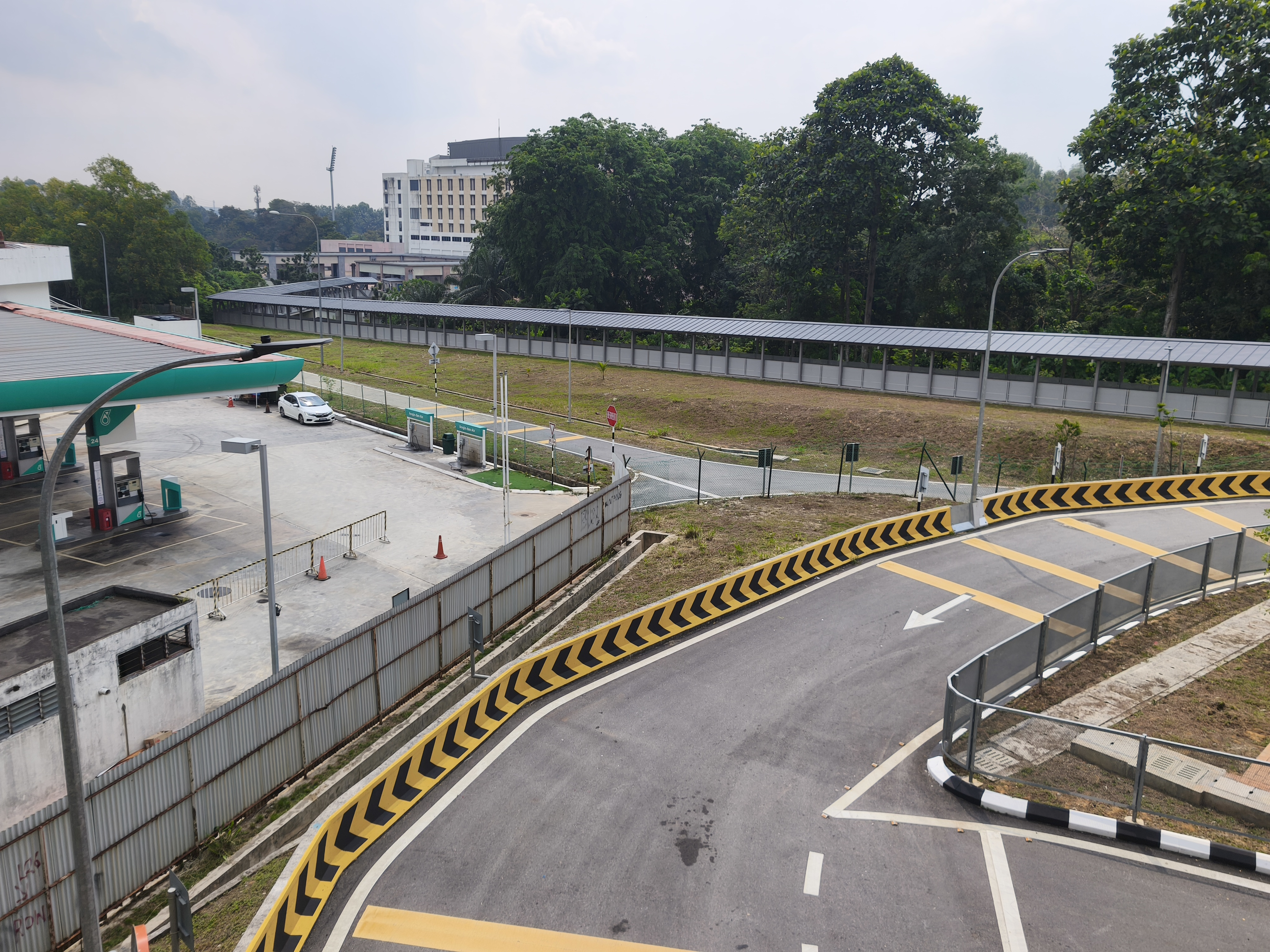
View of the pedestrian walkway from Entrance A towards DATC UiTM

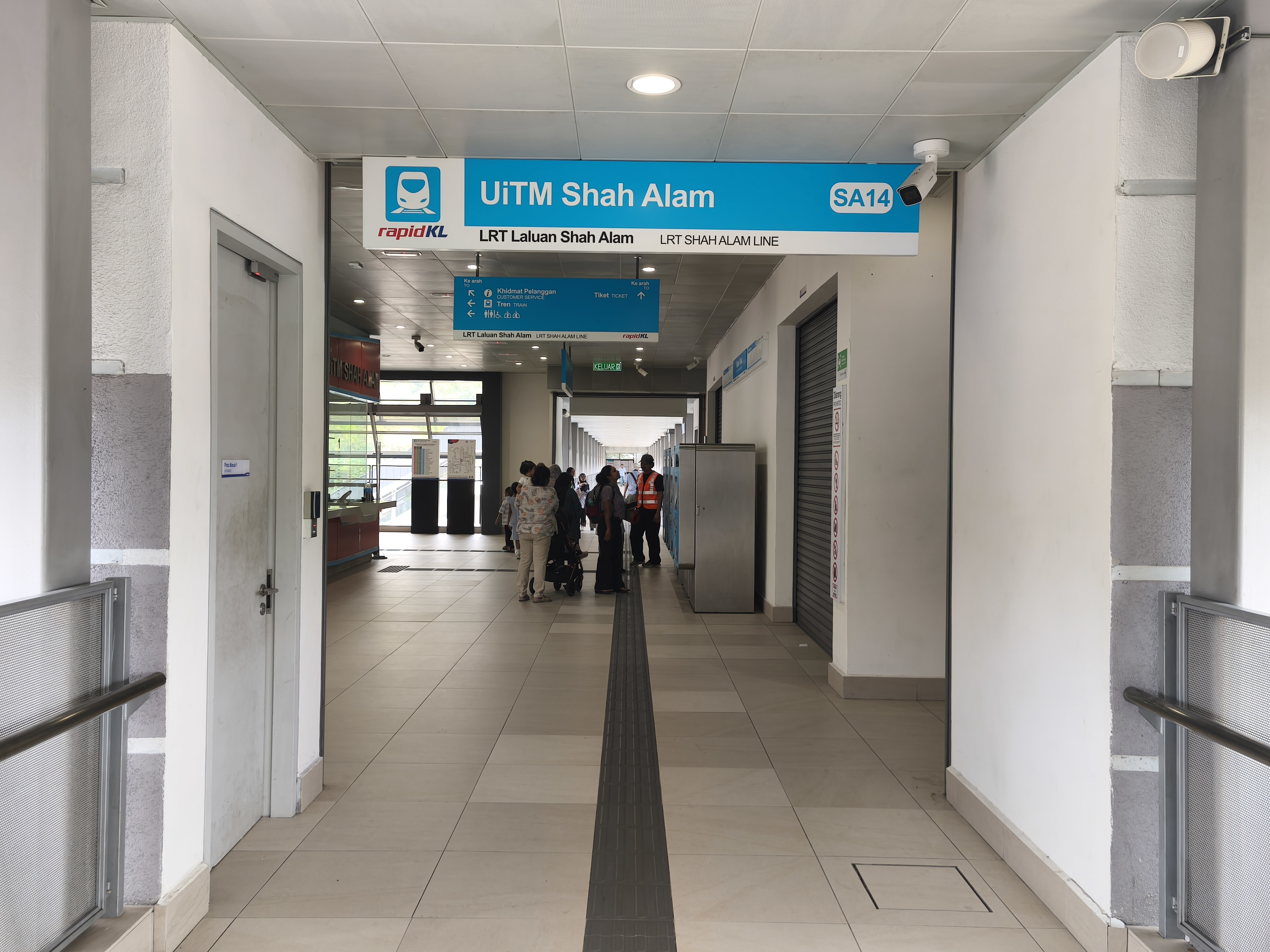
View of the station's concourse from Entrance A

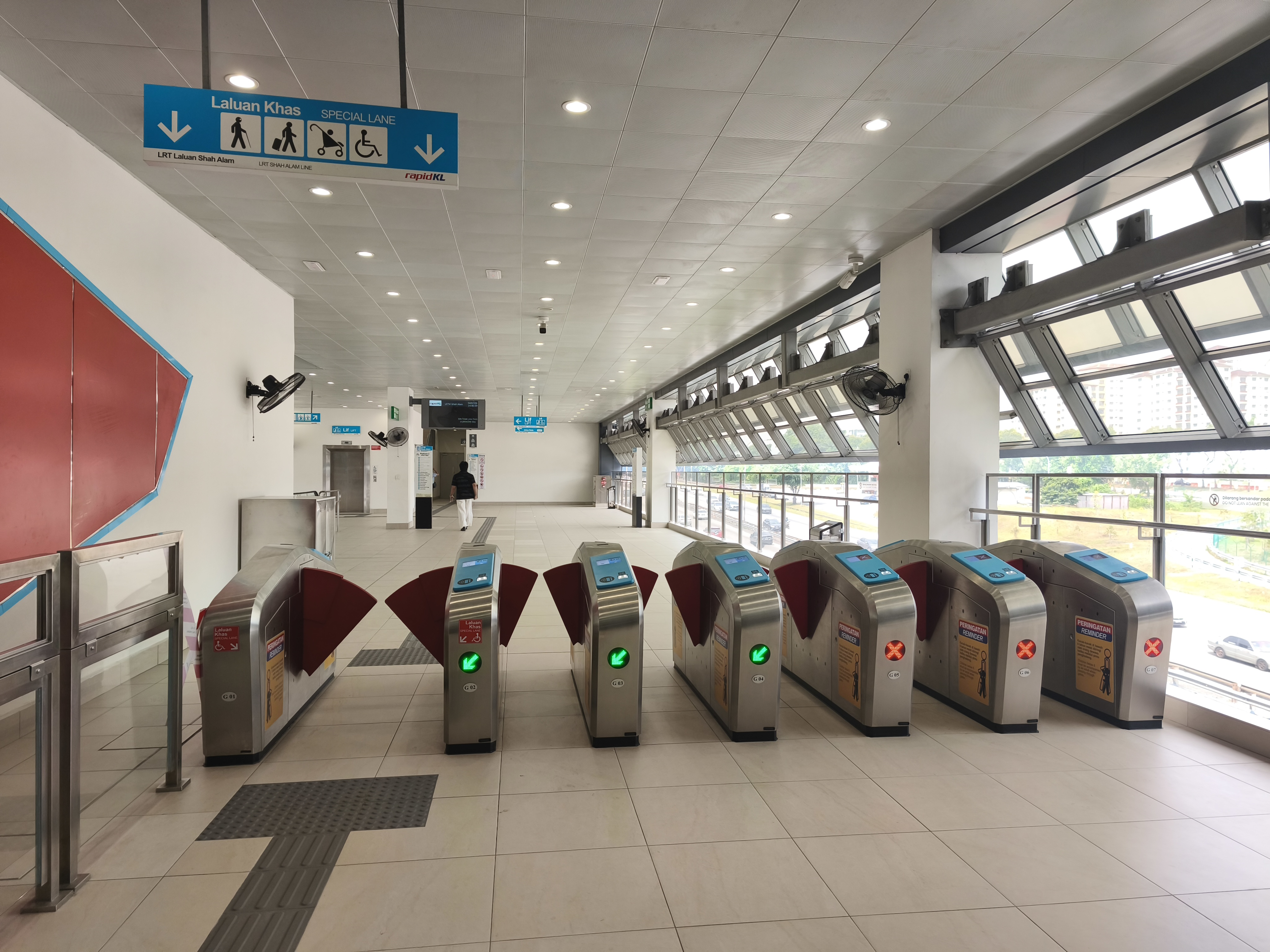
View of the station's faregates

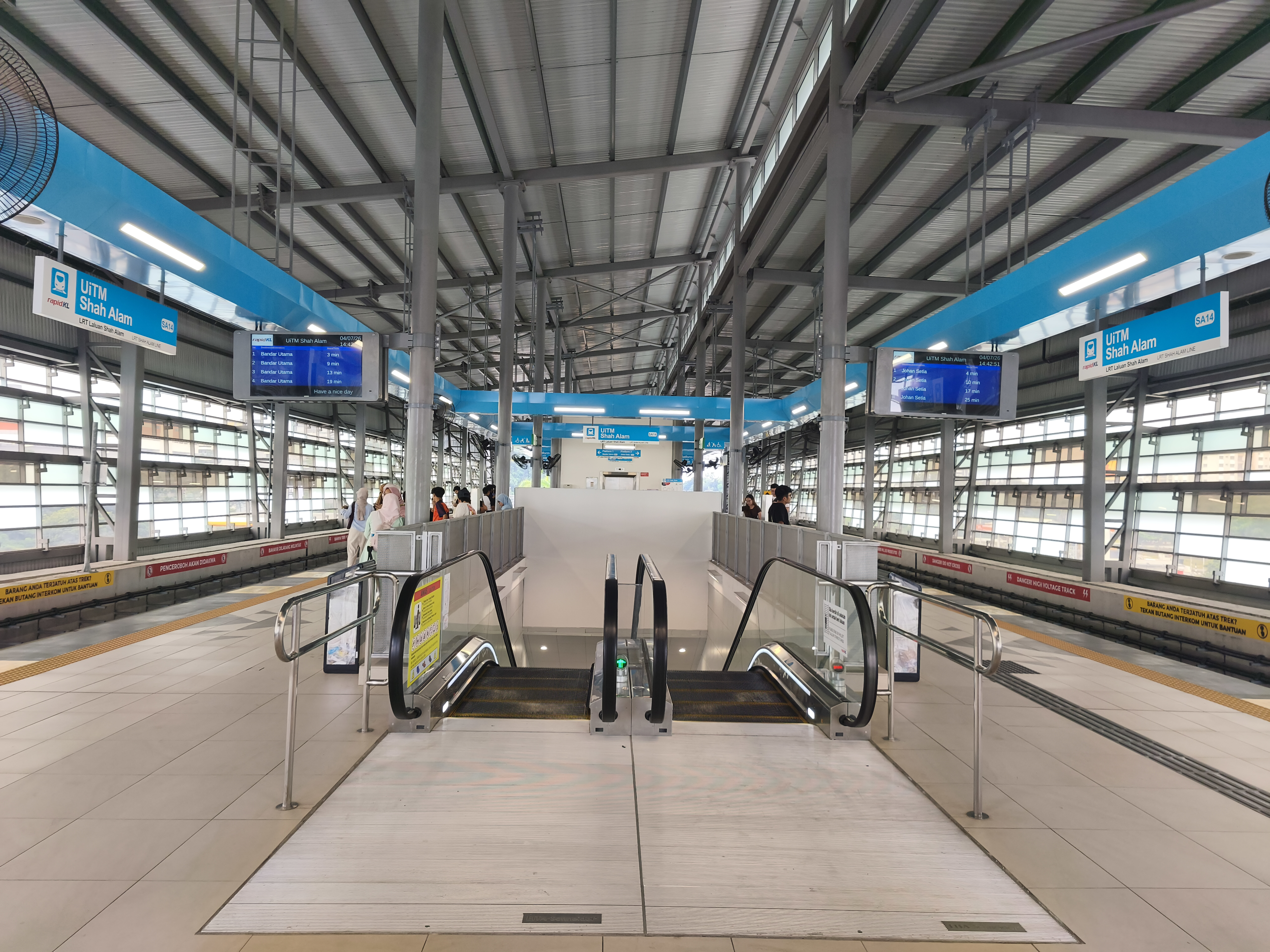
View of the station's platform
