= Raja Muda LRT station =

Metro station in Malaysia

SA13 Raja Muda
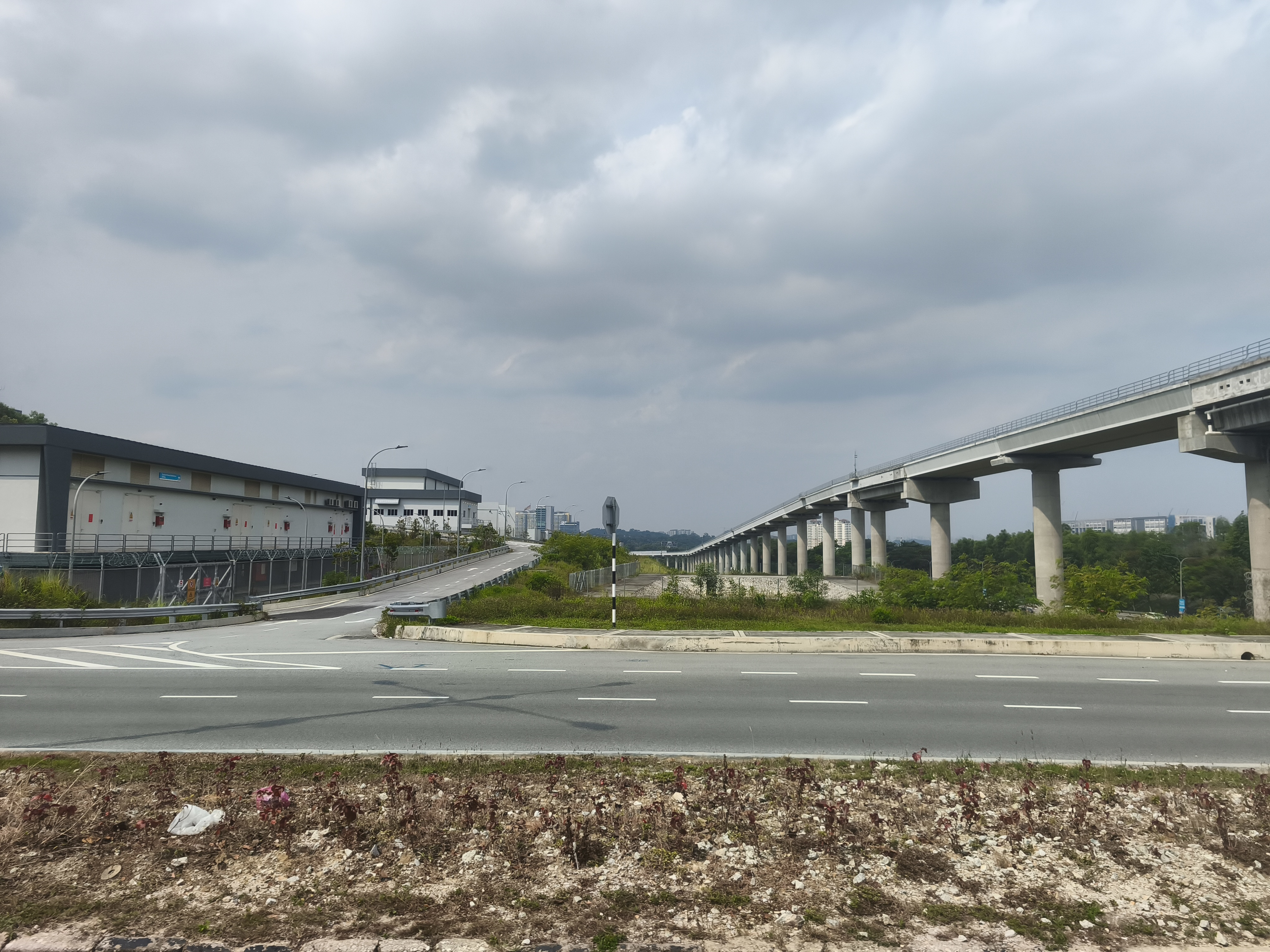

General information
- Location: Section 2, Shah Alam, Selangor; Malaysia
- System: | Future LRT station
- Owner: Prasarana Malaysia
- Operator: Rapid Rail
- Line: 11 Shah Alam
- Platforms: 2 side platforms
- Tracks: 2

Construction
- Structure type: Elevated
- Parking: Available

Other information
- Status: Under construction
- Station code: SA13

Services
Preceding station		Following station
Dato Menteri towards Bandar Utama	Shah Alam Line Future service	UiTM Shah Alam towards Johan Setia
Location

The Raja Muda LRT station is a light rapid transit (LRT) station that will serve the suburb of Section 2 and Section 16 of Shah Alam in Selangor, Malaysia. It serves as one of the stations on the Shah Alam line. The station is located at Section 2 near SIRIM.

The station was under provisional status due to budgetary cuts made during the change of the Malaysian government in 2018. However, on 13 October 2023, during the Budget 2024 presentation, Finance Minister Dato' Seri Anwar Ibrahim announced the reintegration of the five stations that were previously under provisional status including the Raja Muda LRT station to be built alongside the rest of the Shah Alam Line.
