= Dato' Menteri LRT station =

Metro station in Shah Alam, Selangor, Malaysia

SA12 Dato' Menteri – SA Sentral (PKNS)
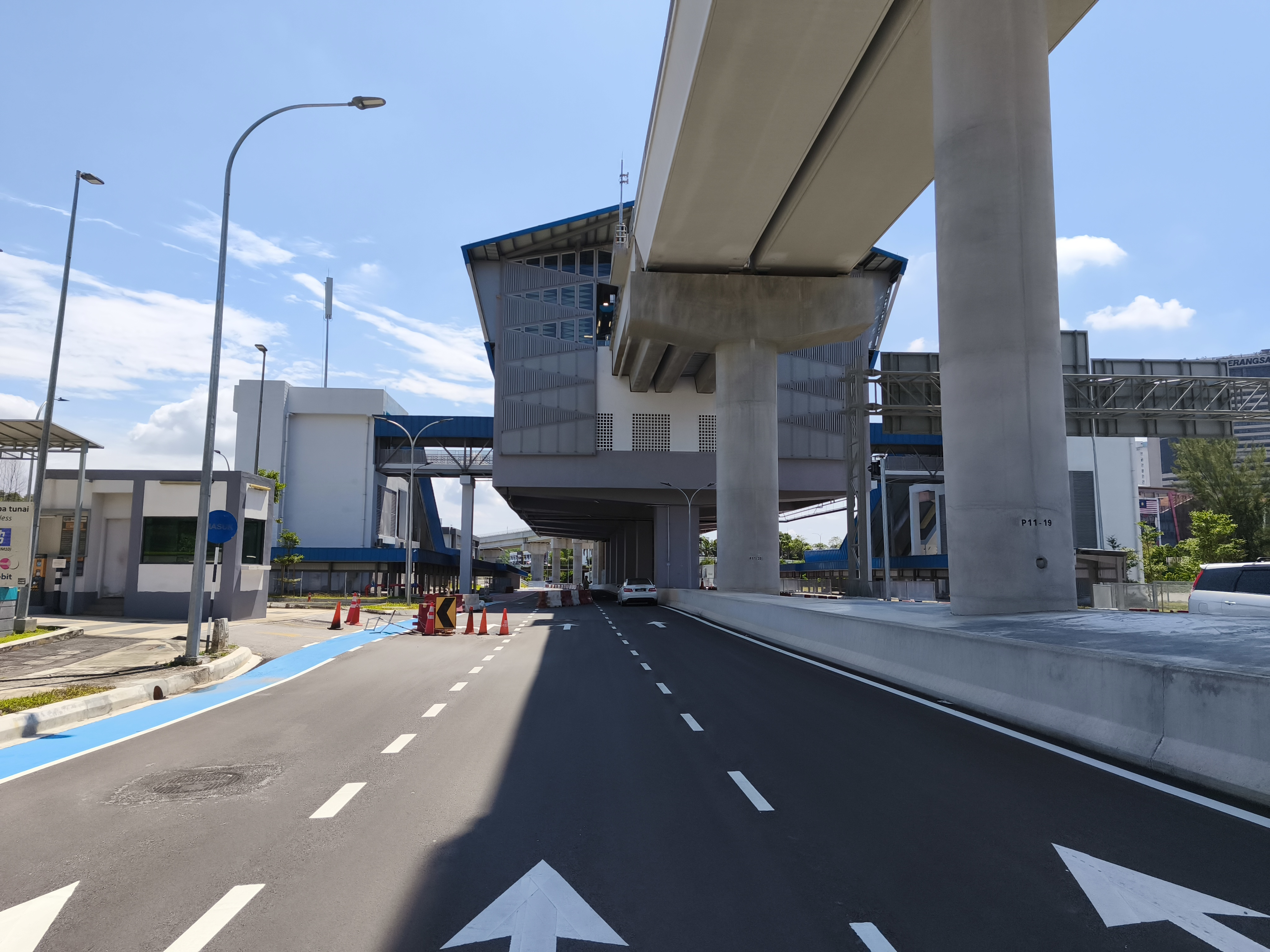
- Dato' Menteri LRT Station view

General information
- Other names: Malay: داتوء منتري (Jawi); Chinese: 拿督孟德里; Tamil: டத்தோ மென்டெரி
- Location: Persiaran Dato' Menteri, Section 14, 40000 Shah Alam, Selangor; Malaysia
- Coordinates: 3°04′12″N 101°31′17″E
- System: Rapid KL
- Owner: Prasarana Malaysia
- Operator: Rapid Rail
- Line: 11 Shah Alam Line
- Platforms: 2 side platforms
- Tracks: 2

Construction
- Structure type: Elevated
- Parking: Not available
- Cycle facilities: Not available
- Accessible: Yes

Other information
- Status: Operational
- Station code: SA12

History
- Opened: 29 June 2026; 4 months ago
- Former names: Section 14, Bandar Anggerik and Bandaraya Shah Alam

Services
| Preceding station | | Following station |
|---|---|---|
| Stadium Shah Alam towards Bandar Utama | Shah Alam Line | UiTM Shah Alam towards Johan Setia |
| Stadium Shah Alam towards Bandar Utama | Shah Alam Line Future service (2031) | Raja Muda towards Johan Setia |
Location

The Dato' Menteri LRT station or Dato' Menteri – SA Sentral (PKNS) for commercial reasons, is a elevated light rapid transit (LRT) station nestled in the state capital city of Shah Alam in Selangor, Malaysia. It serves as one of the stations on the Shah Alam Line. The station is located in Section 14 of the city where most of the important commercial and government departments in the state of Selangor are located, specifically above the Persiaran Dato' Menteri road in which the station is named after.

The station is marked as Station No. 12 along the RM9 billion line project with the line's maintenance depot located in Johan Setia, Klang. Originally this LRT station was expected to be operational in February 2024, however the operational date for the entire Shah Alam Line has been delayed and was operational on 29 June 2026 as mentioned by Transport Minister Anthony Loke. (previously by March 2025 as announced in 2023) It has commuter-friendly facilities such as kiosks, restrooms, elevators, taxi stands, and feeder bus services among others.

== Locality landmarks ==
The station is located directly on top of Persiaran Dato' Menteri, one of the main roads serving the Shah Alam city centre and the namesake of the station. The road and the station both serve Section 14 of Shah Alam. Major landmarks around the station include:

- Selangor International Trade Centre, SITC (previously Shah Alam Convention Center, SACC)
- SACC Mall
- Kompleks PKNS Shah Alam
- AVISENA Hospital
- Dwi Emas International School & Sports Complex
- UTC Selangor (Anggerik Mall)
- Wisma MBSA (Shah Alam City Council)
- Plaza Alam Sentral
- Dataran Shah Alam
- Vista Alam Apartment
- Shah Alam Lake Garden
- Mardhiyyah Hotel (Formerly known as the Grand BlueWave Hotel)
- Sultan Alam Shah Museum (State Museum)
- Sultan Salahuddin Abdul Aziz Mosque (State Mosque)
- Astrum Shah Alam Residences (under construction)
- Sena Residences (under construction)
- Linkar 52 Residences (under construction)

== Station Features ==
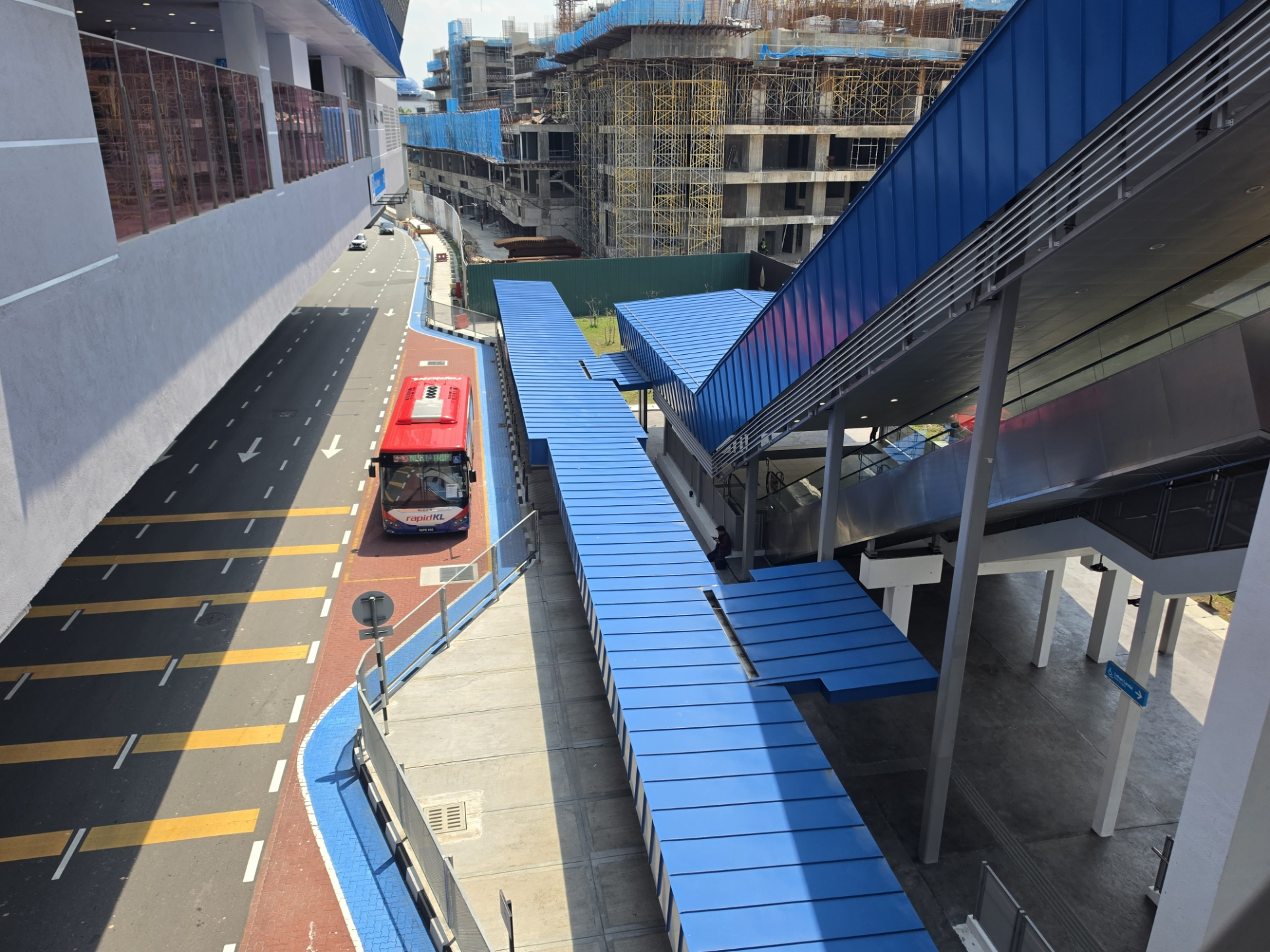
Unlike other stations on the Shah Alam Line, this station's exterior is coloured blue in light of its proximity to the Shah Alam City Council's meeting place.

The station adopts the standard elevated station design for the Shah Alam Line, with two side platforms above the concourse level and two entrances/exits on ground level, below the concourse. There are also facilities designed for the disabled, including tactile paving, disabled toilets, braille on elevator buttons, and low-height elevator buttons and customer service centre counters for wheelchair users. The station also has a blue exterior to reflect the livery of the Shah Alam City Council emblem and meeting place.

=== Station layout ===
| L2 | Platform; Level | Side platform, doors open on the left |
| L2 | Platform; Level | → Platform 1: 11 Shah Alam Line towards SA01 Bandar Utama (Stadium Shah Alam) |
| L2 | Platform; Level | ← Platform 2: 11 Shah Alam Line towards SA26 Johan Setia (UiTM Shah Alam) |
| L2 | Platform; Level | Side platform, doors open on the left |
| L1 | Concourse | Faregates to paid area, escalators, lifts, ticketing machines, customer service counter |
| G | Ground Level | Feeder Bus Stop, Taxi Lay-By |

=== Exits and entrances ===
The station has two entrances. Entrance A is situated on the northern side of Persiaran Dato' Menteri (eastbound) whereas Entrance B is situated on the southern side of Persiaran Dato' Menteri (westbound).

Shah Alam Line station
| Entrance | Location | Destination | Picture |
| A | Persiaran Dato' Menteri (eastbound) | UTC Selangor; SITC; PKNS Shah Alam Complex; Wisma MBSA; Muzium Sultan Alam Shah; Taman Tasik Shah Alam; SSAAS Mosque | |
| B | Persiaran Dato' Menteri (westbound) | Muzium Setem Shah Alam; Pejabat Pos Besar Shah Alam; Lembaga Zakat Selangor | |

== Bus services ==
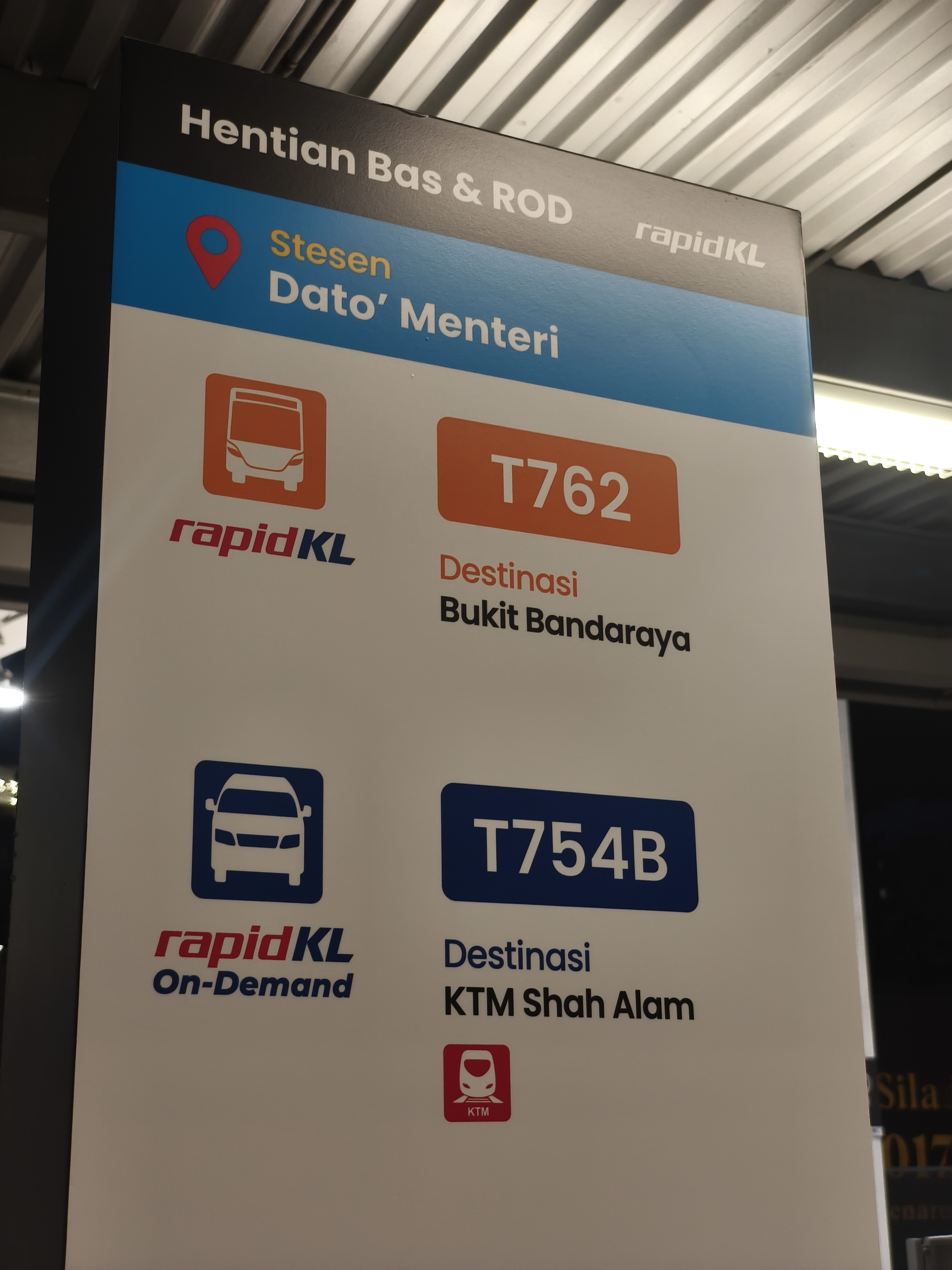
Bus stop signage at Dato' Menteri station showing both LRT Feeder Bus and Rapid KL On-Demand route code and destination

| Route No. | Origin | Destination | Via | Connecting to | Notes |
|---|---|---|---|---|---|
| 752 | KJ37 Putra Heights LRT station | SA12 Dato' Menteri | | | |
| T753 | SA12 Dato' Menteri | Seksyen 6, 7, 8, 9, 10 & 11 | Persiaran Sultan Persiaran Dato Menteri Jalan 14/1 Persiaran Perbandaran Persiaran Damai Persiaran Bandaraya Persiaran Kayangan Jalan Liku 8/1 Jalan Nuri 6/1 | | |
| T754 | SA12 Dato' Menteri | Terminal 17 Shah Alam | | | |
| T756 | SA12 Dato' Menteri | Bukit Rimau Kota Kemuning | | | |
| T762 | SA12 Dato' Menteri | Bukit Bandaraya | Persiaran Tasik Jalan Perbandaran Persiaran Dato Menteri Jalan 14/1 Persiaran Perbandaran Persiaran Damai Persiaran Masjid Persiaran Pegawai Persiaran Raja Muda Persiaran Kayangan Jalan Liku 8/1 Persiaran Gunung Nuang | | |

== Gallery ==
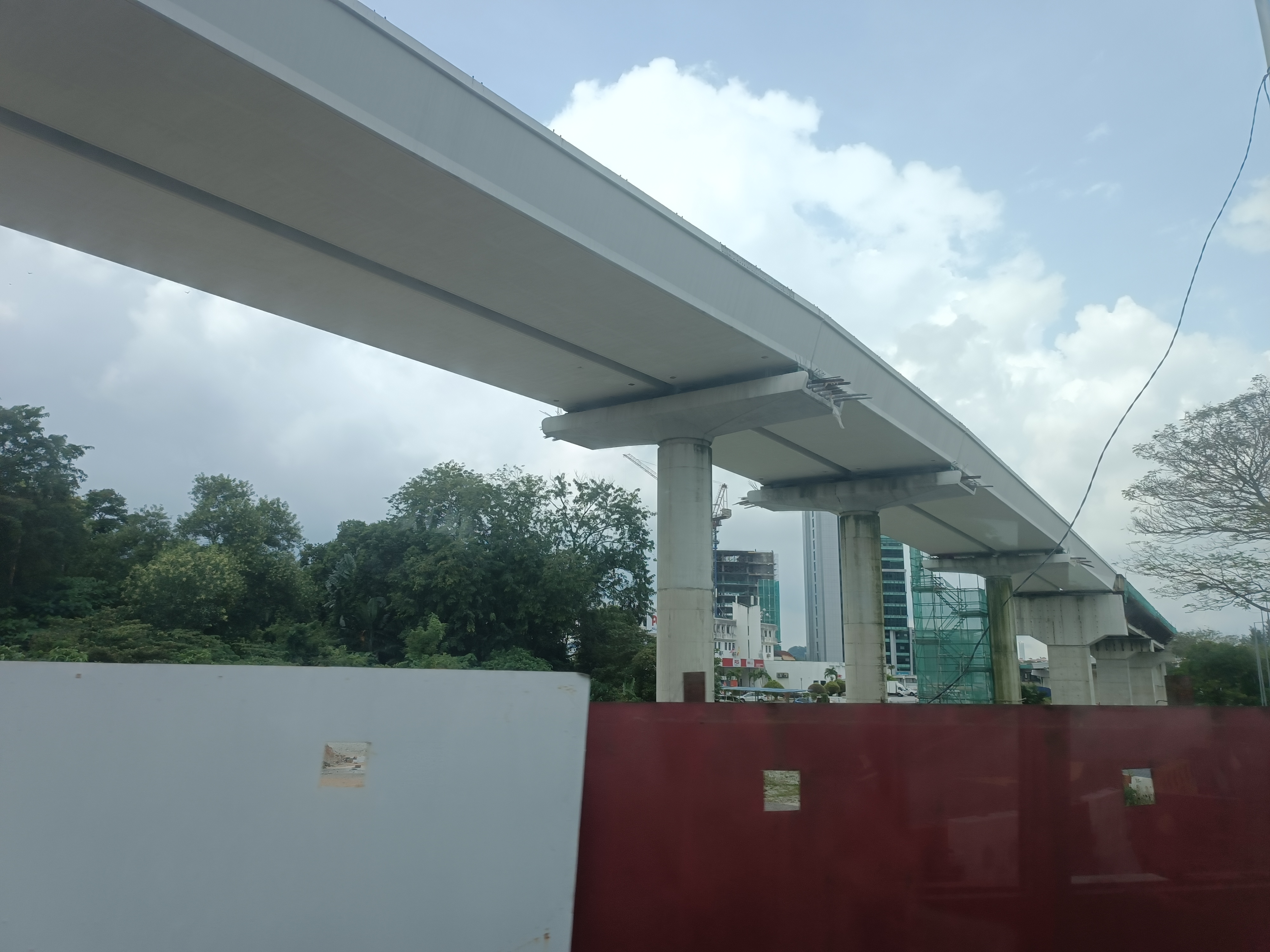
View of the station viaducts under construction in 2023

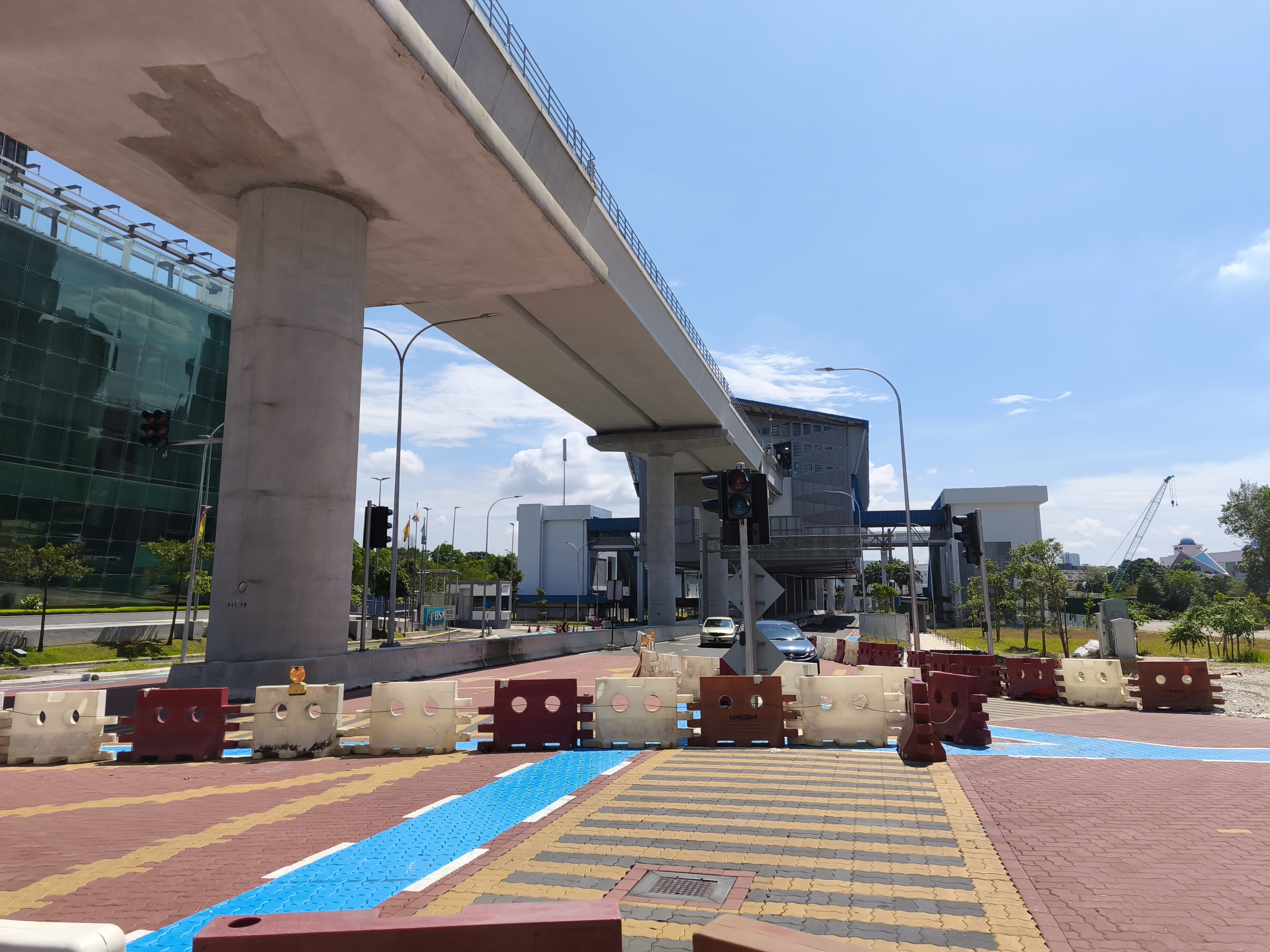
View of the station under construction in 2025

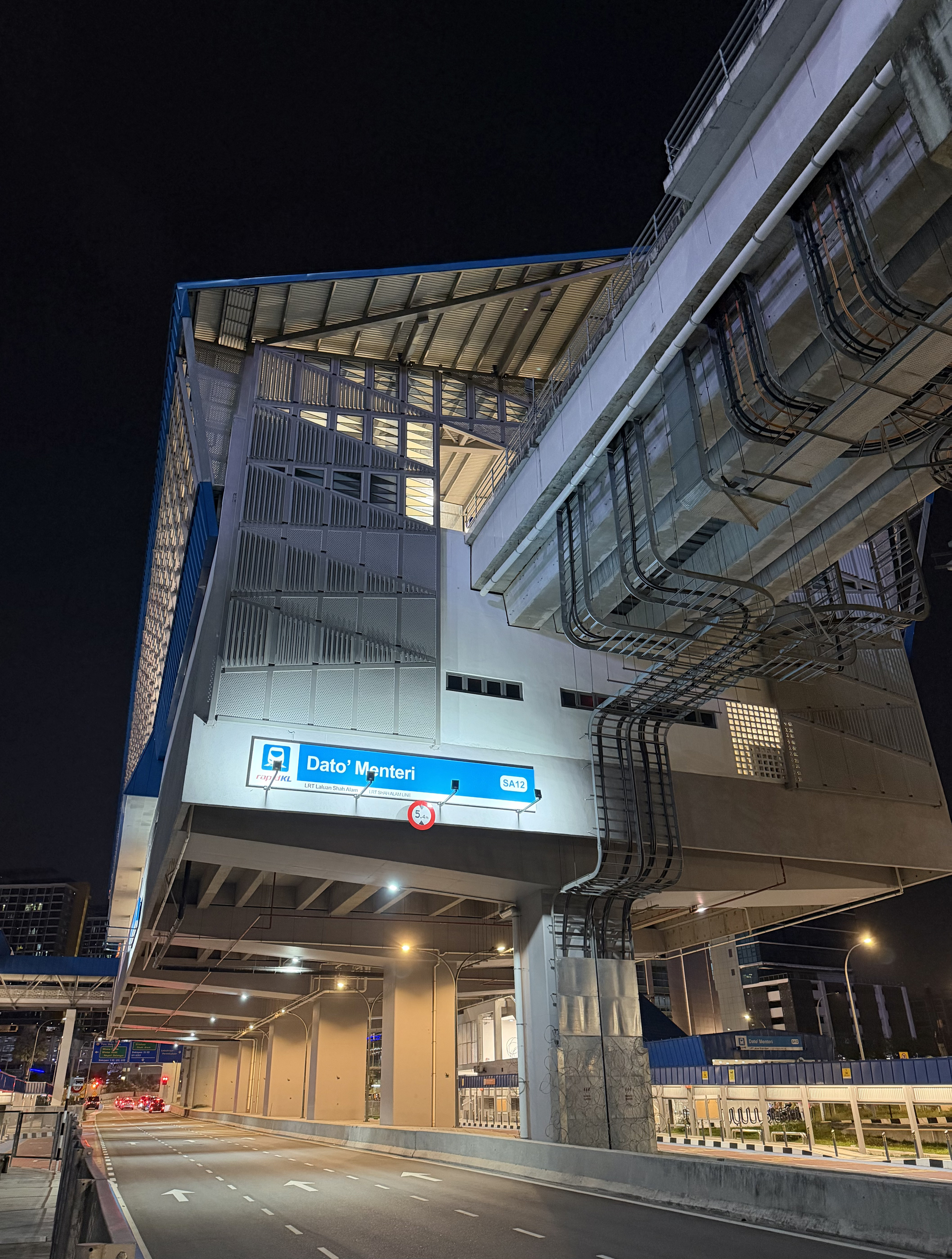
View of the station at night

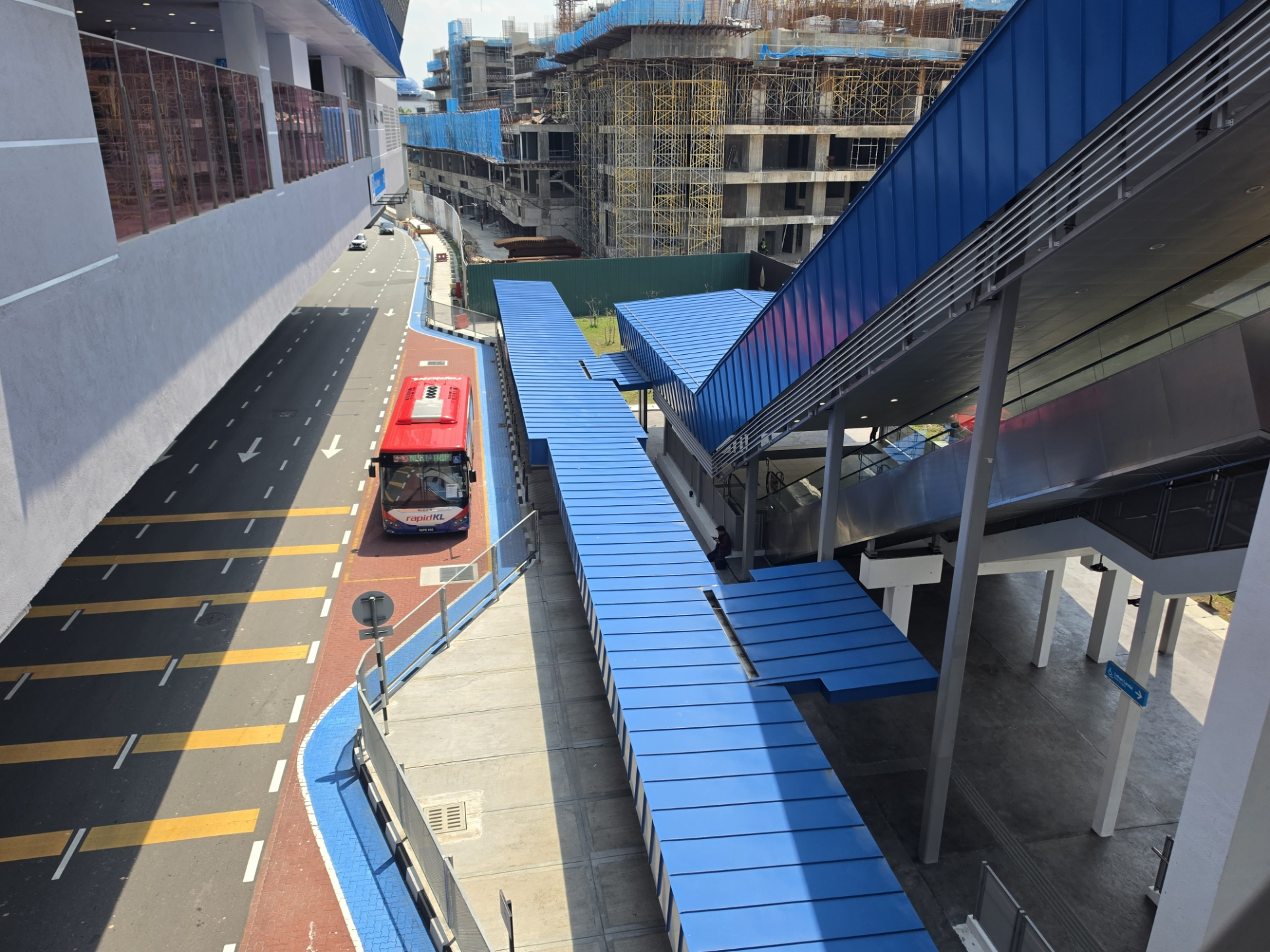
View of the bus stop at Entrance A from the concourse linkbridge

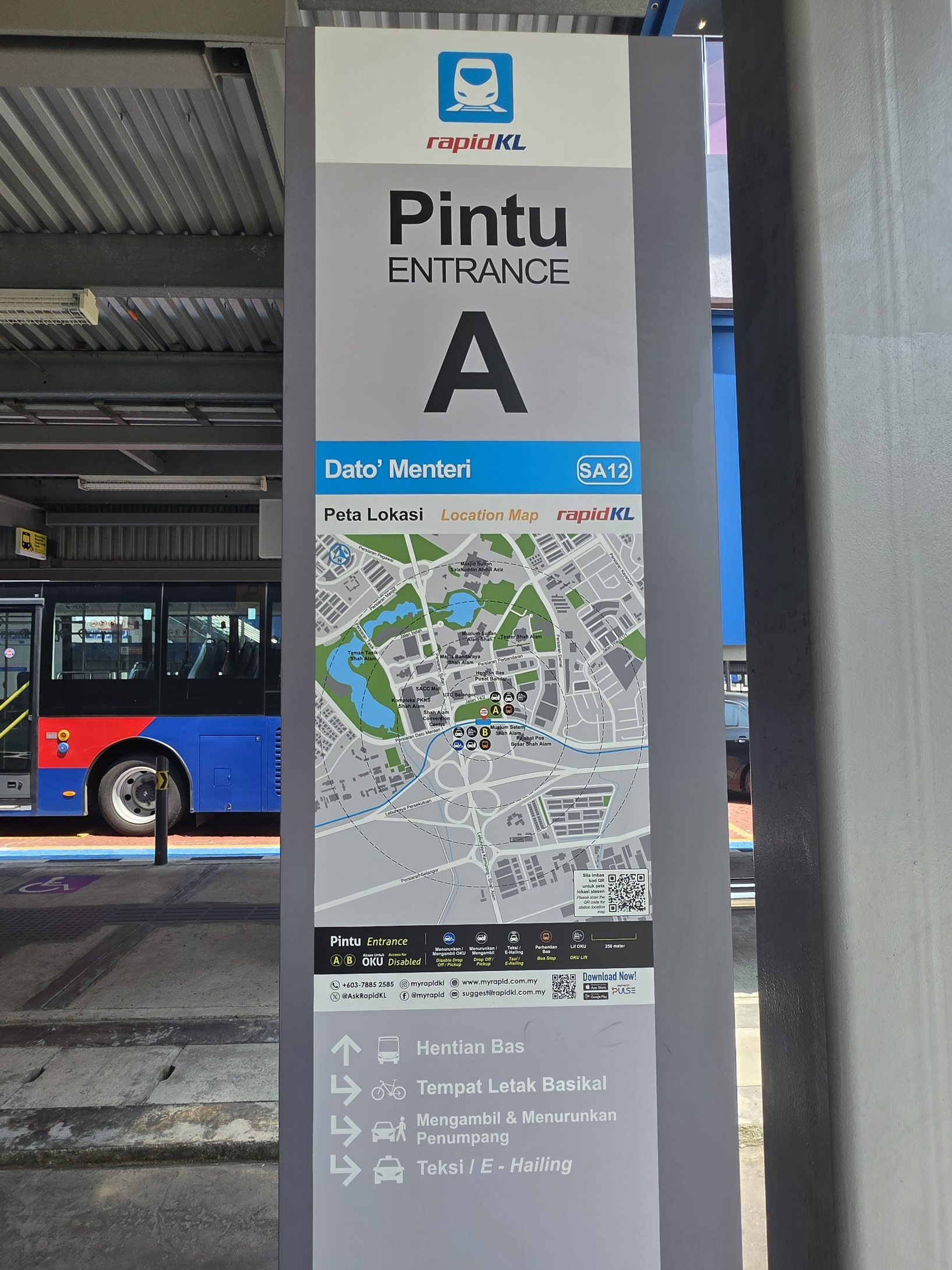
Station location map at Entrance A

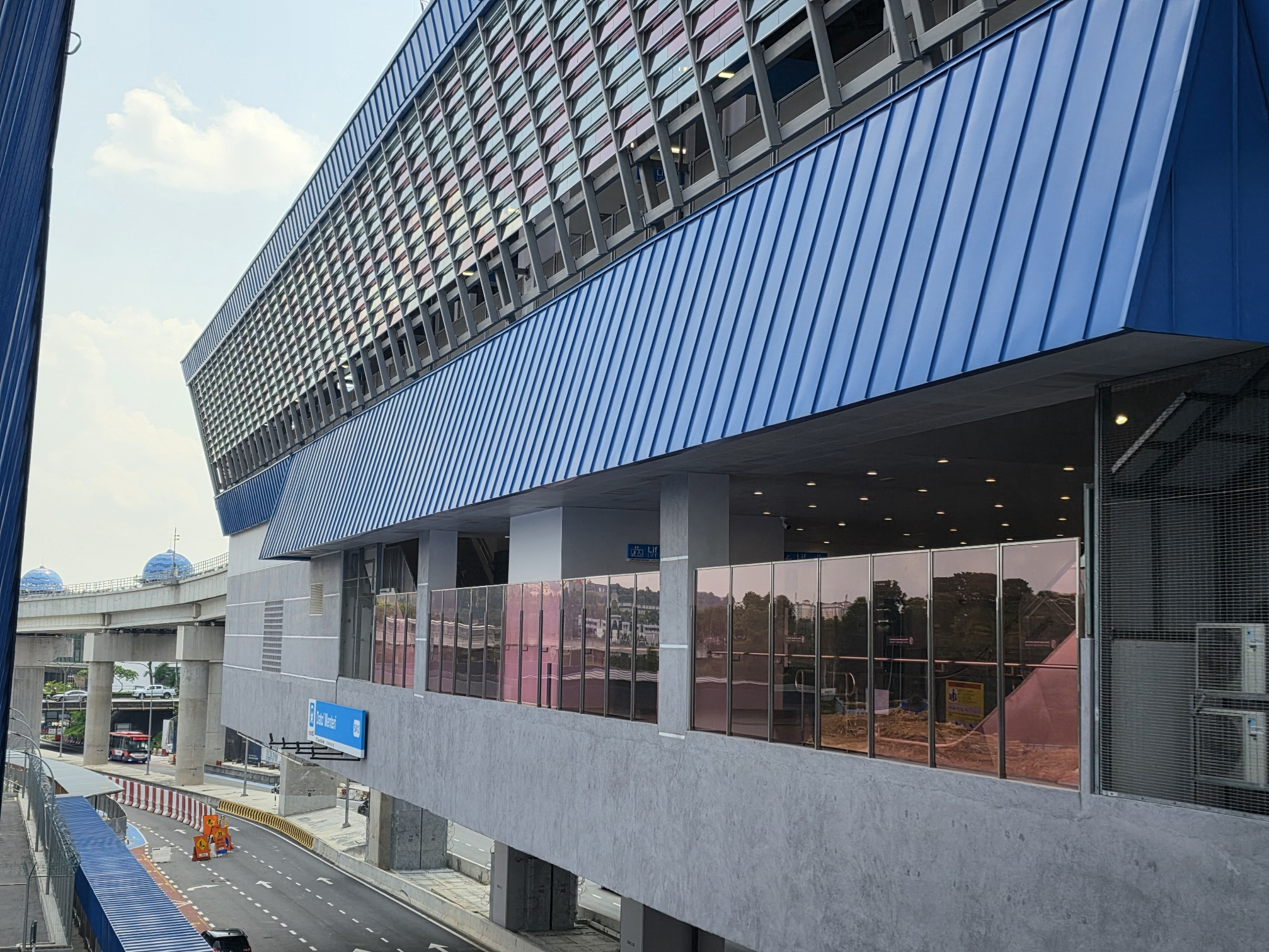
Exterior side view of the station from Entrance A facing east

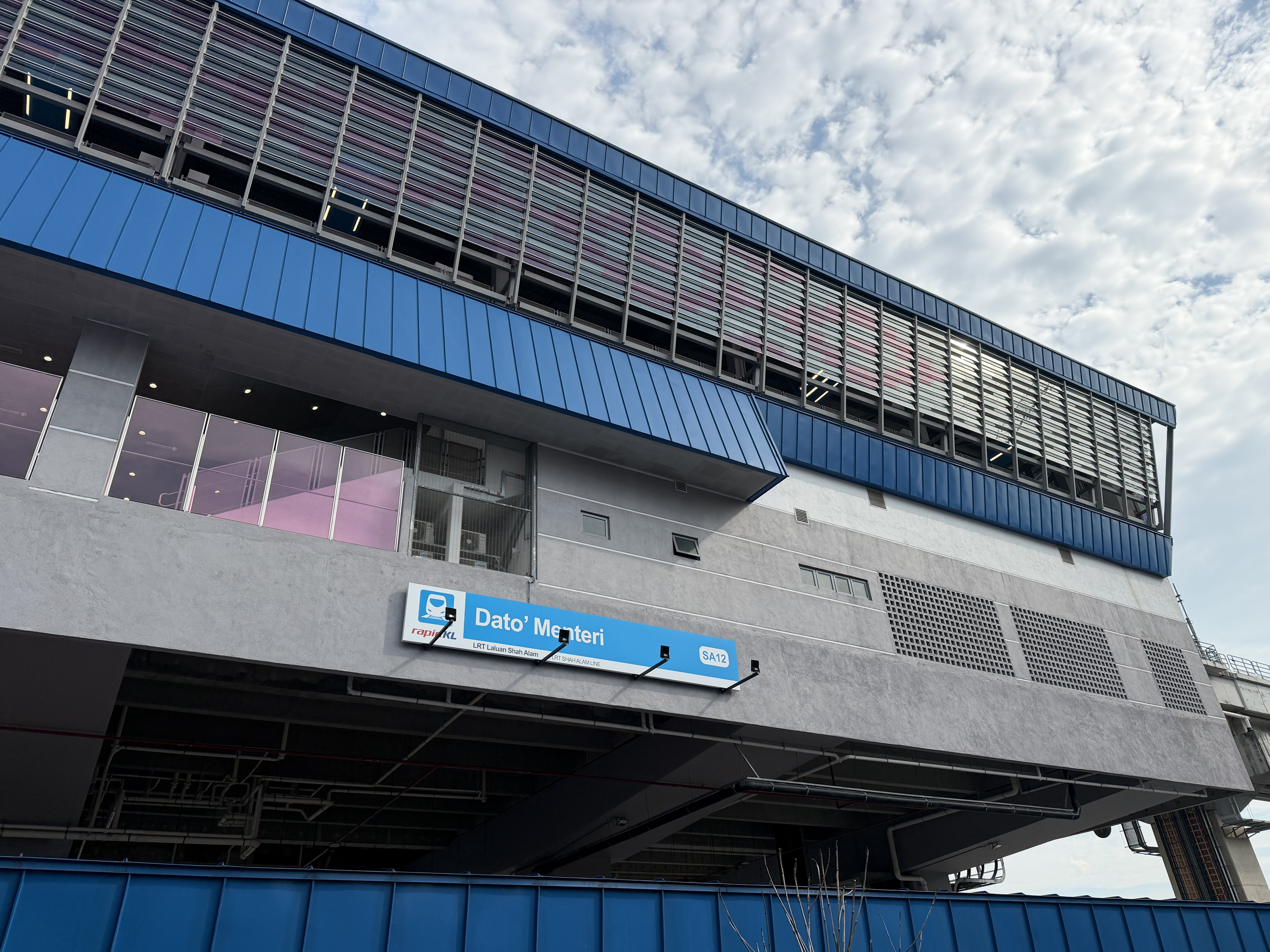
Exterior side view of the station from Entrance A

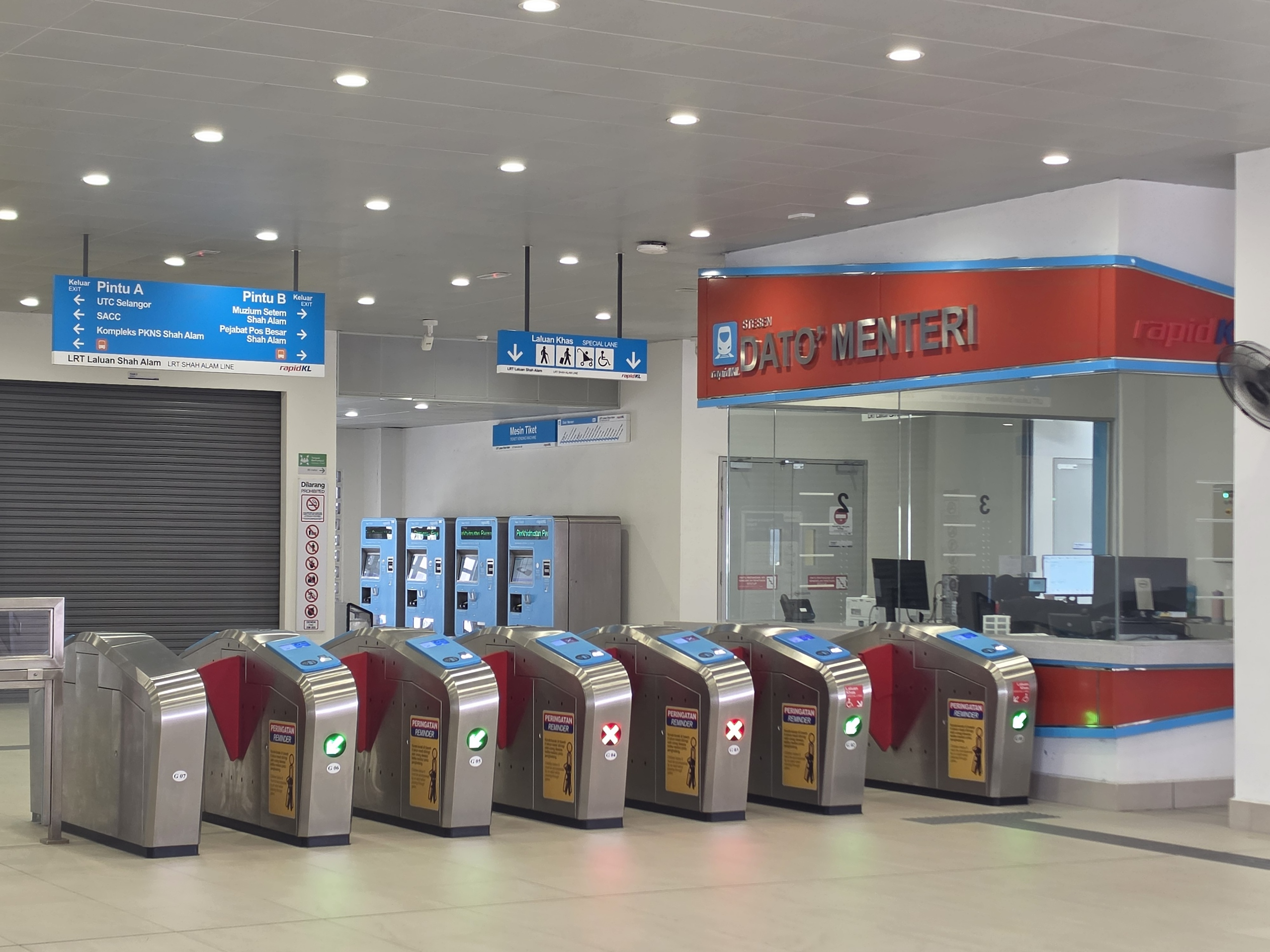
View of the station's concourse

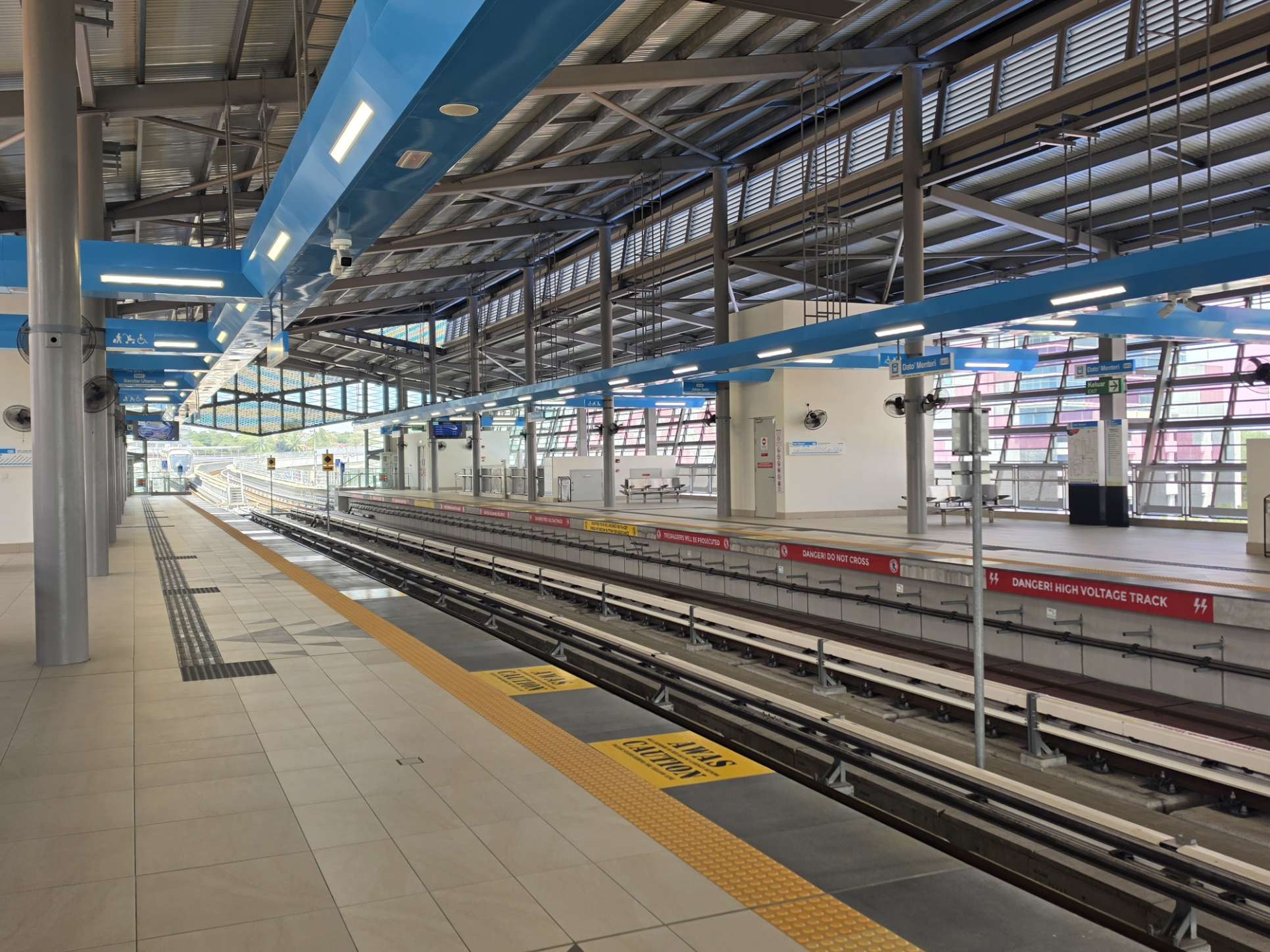
View of the station's platform

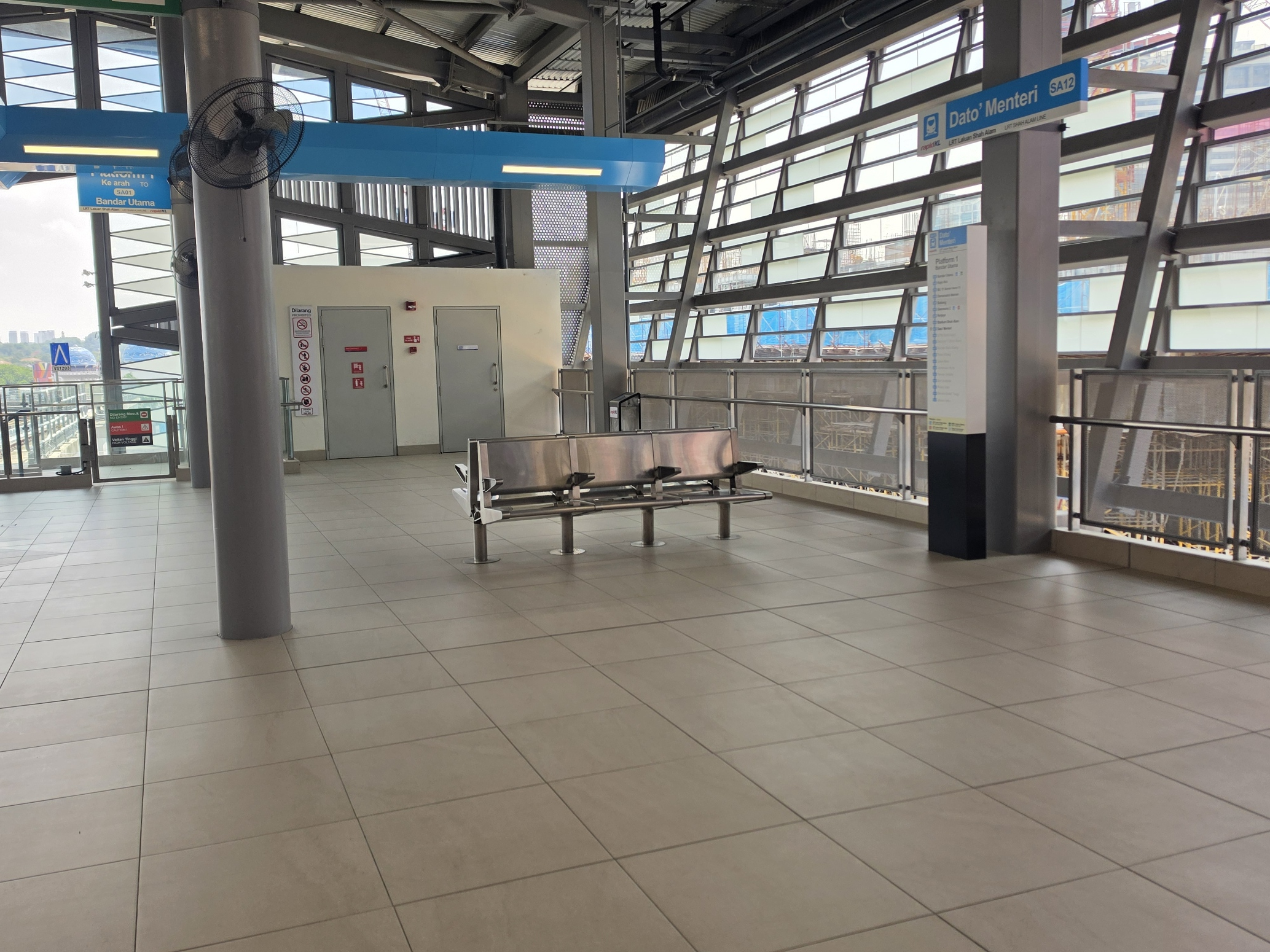
View of the station's platform waiting area
