= BU 11 LRT station =

Metro station in Malaysia

Coordinates: 3.1331549°N 101.6058634°E

SA03 BU 11 (Bandar Utama 11)
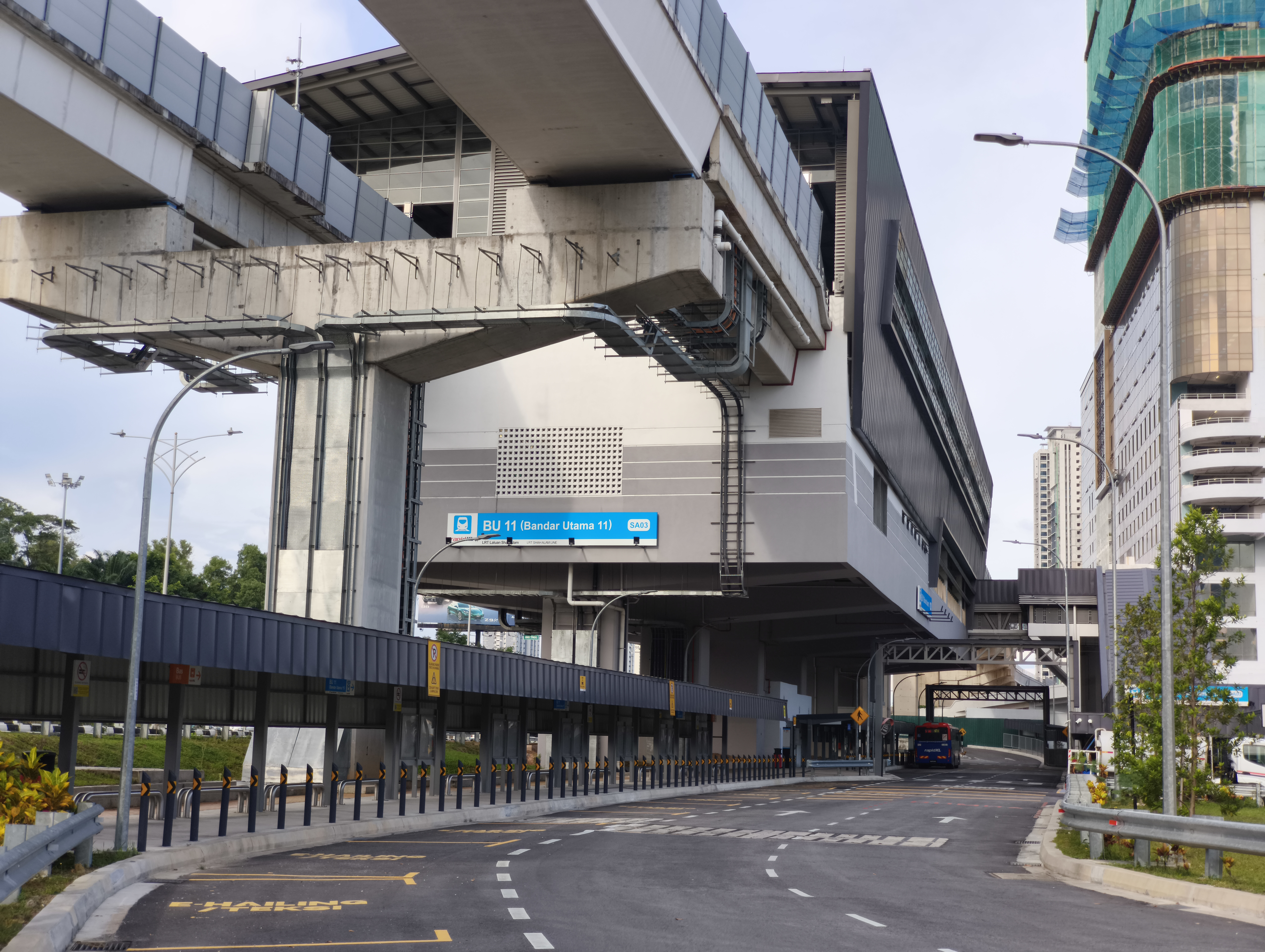
- BU 11 LRT station with link bridge to The Capitol

General information
- Other names: Malay: باندر اوتام سبلس (Jawi); Chinese: 万达镇11区; Tamil: பண்டார் உத்தாமா 11
- Location: Tropicana, Selangor; Malaysia
- System: Rapid KL
- Owner: Prasarana Malaysia
- Operator: Rapid Rail
- Line: 11 Shah Alam Line
- Platforms: 1 island platform
- Tracks: 2

Construction
- Structure type: Elevated
- Parking: Not available
- Accessible: Yes

Other information
- Station code: SA03

History
- Opened: 29 June 2026; 3 months ago

Services
Preceding station		Following station
Kayu Ara towards Bandar Utama	Shah Alam Line	Damansara Idaman towards Johan Setia
Kayu Ara towards Bandar Utama	Shah Alam Line Future service	Tropicana towards Johan Setia
Location

The Bandar Utama 11 LRT station (shortened as BU 11 station) is a Light Rapid Transit (LRT) station that serve the suburb of BU 11 Bandar Utama, Petaling Jaya Malaysia serves as one of the stations on the Shah Alam line. The station is located next to SPRINT Highway Damansara Toll Plaza.The station is an elevated rapid transit station in forming part of the Klang Valley Integrated Transit System.

== History ==
This is the third station along the RM9 billion line project, with the line's maintenance depot located in Johan Setia, Klang. It has facilities such as kiosks, restrooms, elevators, taxi stands, and feeder buses.

The station will be connected to an upcoming 215 meter mixed development called The Capitol via a linked bridge.

== Surrounding Area ==
- BU 11 residential, Bandar Utama
- The Capitol
- The British International School of Kuala Lumpur
- First City University College
- SJK(T) Effingham
- Kuarters Institusi Pendidikan Bandar Utama
- Tropicana Landscape & Nursery
- Merchant Square Comercial Area
- Centerpoint Bandar Utama
- Bayu Puteri Apartment
- Pangsapuri Permai
- Pangsapuri Damai
- SMK Tropicana

== Feeder Bus ==
Route No.	Origin	Destination	Via	Connecting to
T780	SA03 BU 11	Taman Mayang Emas / Muitiara Tropicana; KJ24 Kelana Jaya	Persiaran Tropicana; Jalan Bukit Mayang Emas; SA05 Damansara Idaman; Jalan SS 25/23; Damansara–Puchong Expressway	783, T781, T807
