= Shah Alam Line =

Railway line in Malaysia

LRT Shah Alam Line

- A 3-car CRRC Zhuzhou trainset at Stadium Shah Alam bound for Bandar Utama

Overview
- Other name: LRT3, SAL
- Native name: LRT Laluan Shah Alam
- Status: Operational
- Owner: Prasarana Malaysia
- Line number: 11 (sky blue)
- Locale: Klang Valley
- Termini: SA26 Johan Setia; SA01 Bandar Utama
- Stations: 25 (20 operational, 5 under construction)
- Website: myrapid.com.my

Service
- Type: Light rapid transit
- System: Rapid KL; Klang Valley Integrated Transit System
- Operator: Rapid Rail
- Depot: Johan Setia Depot
- Rolling stock: CRRC Zhuzhou LRV; 22 three-car trainsets Width: 2.7 m (8 ft 10 in) - narrow profile Length: 57.60 m (189.0 ft)
- Daily ridership: 56,788 (Q2 2026)

History
- Opened: Phase 1: 29 June 2026; 4 months ago Phase 2: 2031; 5 years' time

Technical
- Line length: 37.8 km (23.5 mi); Elevated: 35.3 km (21.9 mi); Underground: 2.5 km (1.6 mi)
- Num of tracks: 2
- Character: Mostly elevated with a small underground section
- Track gauge: 1,435 mm (4 ft 8 1/2 in) standard gauge
- Electrification: 750 V DC third rail
- Conduction system: Automated and driverless
- Operating speed: 70 km/h (43 mph)
- Signalling: Siemens CBTC (Trainguard MT)

The LRT Shah Alam Line, previously known as the LRT Bandar Utama–Klang Line or simply LRT3, is a medium capacity rapid transit line which serves the western corridor of the Klang Valley in Selangor, Malaysia. It is the third LRT system, and the fourth fully automated and driverless rail line in the Klang Valley region. The line is operated as part of the Rapid KL system by Rapid Rail, a subsidiary of Prasarana Malaysia.

It was announced by Prasarana Malaysia in 2013 and work began in 2016. Construction was halted in 2018 for a review that followed the change of government and concerns over funding. The project was later revived after it was reclassified from a rapid transit line to a light metro. Its expected completion was moved from 2020 to 2024. Continued delays then pushed the projected completion date through 2025 and eventually into 2026.

The line forms part of the Klang Valley Integrated Transit System. It is numbered 11 and coloured sky blue on official transit maps. The line is one of four rapid transit lines in the Klang Valley that does not serve KL Sentral, the other three being the Ampang Line, Sri Petaling Line and the Putrajaya Line, as well as the first rapid transit line in the Klang Valley that is entirely outside the borders of the Federal Territory of Kuala Lumpur.

== History ==
=== Initial proposal ===
In May 2014, the Shah Alam LRT was proposed to begin from Bandar Utama, Kelana Jaya, running through areas of Glenmarie, HICOM-Glenmarie Industrial Park, Shah Alam Stadium, Shah Alam city centre, UiTM, I-City, Bukit Raja Shopping Centre, Taman Eng Ann, Bandar Klang and then heading straight on to Johan Setia. This was later confirmed in October 2015 following the tabling of Budget 2015 where the Prime Minister announced that the government will provide RM9 billion to build an LRT project linking Bandar Utama to Shah Alam and Klang.

=== Reception of approval ===
In 2015, the public display of the line will was held for three months beginning in May at seven locations – the offices of the Shah Alam City Council, Petaling Jaya City Council, Land Public Transport Agency, Klang Royal City Council (then known as Klang Municipal Council), as well as the Kelana Jaya, Masjid Jamek, and Pasar Seni LRT stations. It was also announced that construction works were to start by Q1-2016. In September 2015, Prasarana Malaysia Berhad announced that Malaysian Resources Corporation Berhad (MRCB) and George Kent Sdn Bhd joint venture (JV) has been appointed as the Project Delivery Partner (PDP) for the LRT project. In October 2015, Prasarana agreed to change the route of the LRT line, which was originally planned to cut through the housing area of Taman Muhibbah in Klang to Pasar Besar Klang (Klang wet market) at Jalan Meru. Residents of Taman Muhibbah had objected to the proposed line which would run through their housing area. The LRT project was officially launched by the sixth Malaysian Prime Minister Najib Razak in August 2016.

=== Project cost cutting and downgrade to light metro ===
After the fall of the Barisan Nasional (BN)–led federal government in May 2018, the new Pakatan Harapan (PH)–led federal government, citing mounting national debt, proposed various cost-cutting measures to a list of federal government projects, including the LRT3 project. The Lien Hoe, Temasya, SIRIM, Bukit Raja and Bandar Botanik stations were reclassified to provisional stations while the underground station of Persiaran Hishamuddin was cancelled. The reasons cited for the changes made were due to the high cost of the project, unnecessary tunneling for the underground portion of the line and low ridership in the area. The provisional stations however will be built once demand in the area picks up.

Other cost-cutting exercises included the swapping of six-car trains for three-car trains, cutting down the total trains from 42 to 22, reducing the size of the stations to four-car length and ditching costly acceleration techniques. The completion date was also extended from 2020 to 2024.

=== Numerous delays and reinstatement of provisional stations ===
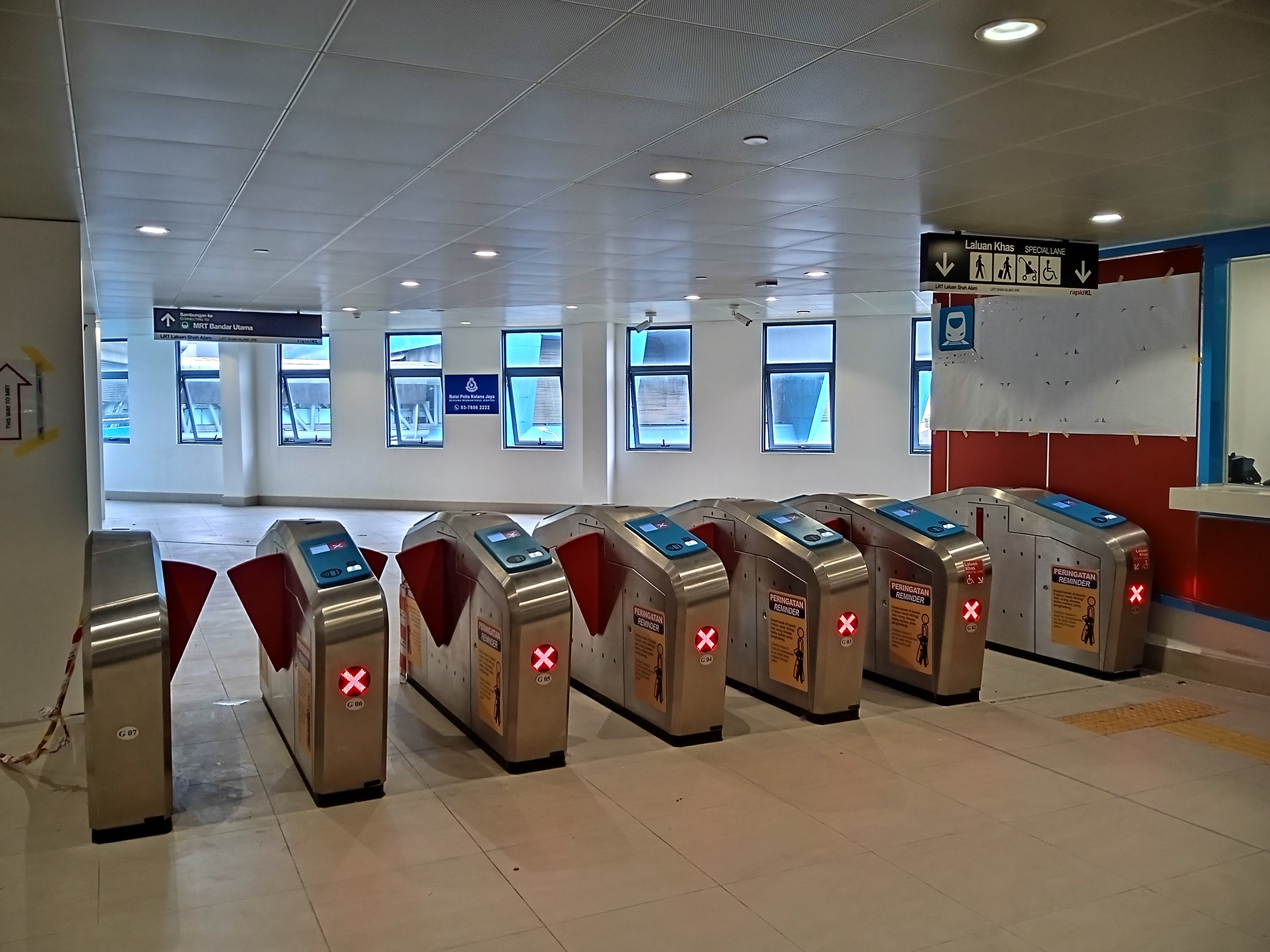
Fare gates at the concourse level of Bandar Utama station for Shah Alam Line service

The planned completion date of the entire line in 2024 as announced in 2018 was delayed for over two years due to the impact of the Malaysian movement control order from the COVID-19 pandemic and further testing of operations. The first delay for the overall opening of the line was announced in July 2023 where Transport Minister Anthony Loke mentioned that the line was expected to be operational by 1 March 2025.

During the Budget 2024 presentation held on 13 October 2023, Finance Minister Anwar Ibrahim announced the reintegration of the five stations that were previously under provisional status (Tropicana, Temasya, Raja Muda, Bukit Raja Selatan, Bandar Botanik) to be built alongside the rest of the Shah Alam Line with the exception of the sole underground station, Persiaran Hishamuddin, which remains cancelled.

In July 2024, the opening of the LRT line was further delayed to the third quarter of 2025. In February 2025, the opening of the LRT line was confirmed to be on 30 September 2025, with physical work reaching 98.16% completion. Construction was expected to be completed on 31 July and then handed over to Prasarana. Trial runs were to be conducted from mid-April to the end of June 2025. The total cost of the project was ultimately put at RM21.93 billion. In August 2025, the opening of the LRT line was delayed again for the fourth time, which is before the end of 2025, (Note: The first delay was before the LRT3 cost restructuring and changed the estimated completion date from 2020 to 2024. The second delay was announced in 2023, further delaying the projected completion from 2024 to March 2025. The third delay was announced in 2024, where the date was pushed back from March 2025 to the third quarter of 2025. The fourth delay was announced in early 2025, with the date being pushed back further to 31 December 2025.) as further tests such as the fault-free run (FFR) test are still ongoing.

The delay was first teased by Prasarana through a social media post that the 24-hour train testing and commissioning activities of this line were ongoing until 31 October 2025, then further hinted on by a Prasarana internal memo, in which the company's CEO hoped for the line's opening in December 2025. It was finally confirmed by Transport Minister Loke, who stated that there were "slight delays", although he affirmed that he was confident that the line would be operational by 31 December 2025. However, the line was delayed once again to 2026 due to software glitches in the signalling system and the line's inability to complete the required fault-free run. (Note: In early December, the opening of the line was delayed once again to 2026 due to software glitches in the signalling system and the line's inability to complete the required fault-free run.)

In February 2026, Transport Minister Loke confirmed that the LRT3 Shah Alam line is expected to begin operations by June 2026 at the latest. While Prasarana has set a conservative timeline for June, Loke expressed confidence that the line could be ready as early as April 2026, although this deadline was ultimately missed.

On 15 June 2026, Transport Minister Loke at the 62nd Annual General Meeting of the Malaysian Road Safety Council announced that the operations of the line is set to begin by month's end with the official date to be disclosed within the next two weeks, citing that the trial operations for the line have gone smoothly and the system is prepared for passenger service.

On 22 June 2026, Loke officially announced at the new Road Transport Department branch in Bandar Tasik Selatan that the line will begin full passenger operations on 29 June 2026 (Monday), with the opening ceremony to be officiated by Prime Minister Datuk Seri Anwar Ibrahim on 28 June 2026. Around the time of the line's launch ceremony, Prasarana's head of operations, Mohd Ariffin Idris and Loke mentioned that the previously provisional stations will begin construction by year's end and is targeted for opening in 2031. Prime Minister Anwar also mentions free fares (including train ride, feeder buses, and park & ride) for one month until 31 July 2026. On 31 July 2026, Rapid KL announced the free fares are extended until 14 August 2026.

== Overview ==
=== Route ===
Route of Shah Alam Line

The line covers a span of 37.8 kilometres (23.5 mi) from Bandar Utama to Johan Setia, passing through the cities of Petaling Jaya, Shah Alam, and Klang. The line serves more than 2 million residents within the western corridor of the Klang Valley region.

The line begins from Bandar Utama which is located near to the northwest borders of Kuala Lumpur and runs on an all-elevated guideway passing through villages of Kampung Sungai Kayu Ara, Tropicana, Subang, and the northeastern Shah Alam industrial areas of Glenmarie and HICOM-Industrial Park before serving the upcoming reconstruction of the Shah Alam Sports Complex in Section 13 via Stadium Shah Alam station. After that, the line continues into a 2.5 kilometres (1.6 mi) underground tunnel before resurfacing nearby the Shah Alam city centre of Section 14 at Dato' Menteri, before running parallel to the New Klang Valley Expressway (NKVE) and serving Universiti Teknologi MARA (UiTM) and Section 7 before entering the district borders of Klang, serving Bandar Baru Klang, Kawasan 17, Klang city centre, Taman Sri Andalas, and Bandar Bukit Tinggi before terminating at Johan Setia.

There are also several stations equipped with Park N' Ride areas, either officially managed by Prasarana or by third-parties. For Park N' Rides managed by Prasarana, LRT-commuters will be charged RM 5.00 per entry and must use the same Touch 'n Go card when entering/exiting the parking area and boarding the trains.

=== Station designs ===
All of the operational stations are elevated, and is inspired by the concept theme of "tanjak" or "tengkolok" which is a symbol of Malaysian cultural heritage and splendor that combines traditional and modern elements, providing unique characteristic values. Of the 20 stations, two of them have a unique design from the rest, namely Stadium Shah Alam which is heavily decorated with sports-themed elements and consisting of a wider internal concourse area, and Dato' Menteri which has a different shade of blue as it is meant to resemble the trademark of the Shah Alam City Council (MBSA) on its exterior.

All stations are equipped with ticket vending machines, automatic bar entrance doors, information display systems (PIDS), feeder buses and on-demand transport information banners, as well as escalators, lifts, suraus, and toilets that are disabled-friendly and wheelchair accessible serving each platform.

== List of stations ==
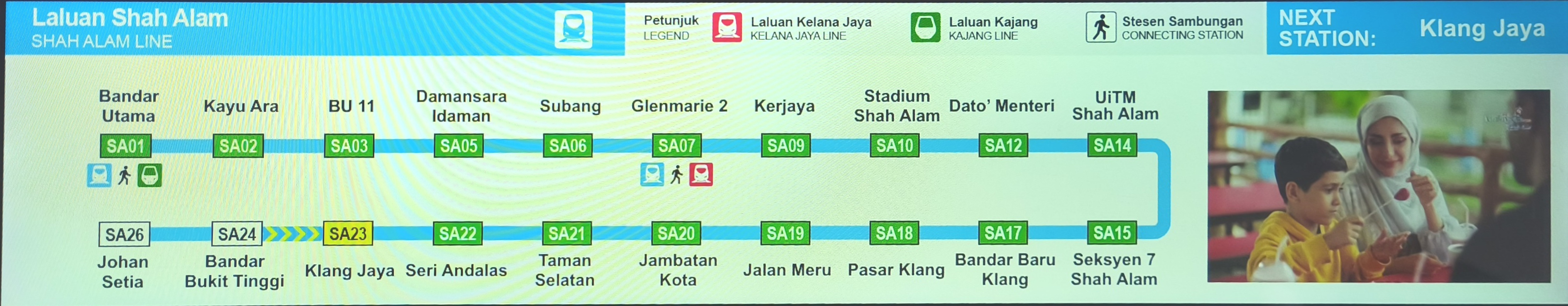
A Dynamic Route Map Display (DRMD) showing the train on its way northbound to Klang Jaya

Originally, a total of 26 stations were planned, with a proposed two-kilometre distance between each station. One station was to be an underground station, which was subsequently cancelled and instead turned into a tunnel ventilation control station. The other 25 stations are to be elevated.

The line also connects with two other existing Rapid KL lines; one at Bandar Utama to the Kajang Line, and the other at Glenmarie to the Kelana Jaya Line. While not designated as an official interchange or connection on official transit maps, the Klang on the KTM Komuter Tanjung Malim–Port Klang Line is within walking distance from Jambatan Kota.

The line currently has 25 permanent stations on this line with 20 stations opened on 29 June 2026, with the remaining five (5) previously reserved stations are expected to begin construction in the fourth quarter of 2026 and set to begin operations in 2031.

Station code	Station name	Image	Opening	Platform type	Position	Park & Ride	Connecting Bus Lines	Interim Name	Connecting station	Notes
SA01	Bandar Utama		29 June 2026	Island	Elevated	✓	T811; T812	One Utama	Eastern terminus. Connecting station to KG09 Kajang Line.	
SA02	Kayu Ara		29 June 2026	Island	Elevated	✓		Damansara Utama		
SA03	BU 11		29 June 2026	Island	Elevated	N/A	T780; T811	Tropicana		
SA04	Tropicana		2031	Side	Elevated			Lien Hoe		Future in-fill station.
SA05	Damansara Idaman		29 June 2026	Side	Elevated	✓	T807; T780	Dataran Prima		
SA06	Subang		29 June 2026	Side	Elevated	N/A	T781	SS7 / Persada Plus / Kelana Indah		
SA07	Glenmarie 2		29 June 2026	Side	Elevated	N/A		Glenmarie 2	Connecting station to KJ27 Kelana Jaya Line.	
SA08	Temasya		2031	Side	Elevated	N/A		Temasya		Future in-fill station.
SA09	Kerjaya		29 June 2026	Side	Elevated	N/A	T779	HICOM-Glenmarie / Persiaran Kerjaya		
SA10	Stadium Shah Alam		29 June 2026	Island	Elevated	N/A	754; SA02; SA05	Malawati		
SA11	~~Persiaran Hishamuddin~~		-		Underground			-		Shelved station Converted into a Tunnel Ventilation Control station
SA12	Dato' Menteri–SA Sentral (PKNS)		29 June 2026	Side	Elevated	N/A	T753; T762	Section 14 / Bandar Anggerik / Bandaraya Shah Alam		
SA13	Raja Muda		2031	Side	Elevated			SIRIM / Seksyen 2		Future in-fill station.
SA14	UiTM Shah Alam		29 June 2026	Island	Elevated	N/A	T764; SA04	UiTM		
SA15	Seksyen 7 Shah Alam–Pet World		29 June 2026	Side	Elevated	N/A	T765; SA01; SA04; 753	i-City / Hospital Shah Alam		
SA16	Bukit Raja Selatan		2031	Side	Elevated			Lebuh Keluli		Future in-fill station.
SA17	Bandar Baru Klang		29 June 2026	Island	Elevated	N/A	KLG2B	Bukit Raja		
SA18	Pasar Klang		29 June 2026	Side	Elevated	✓	T728; T729; KLG2A; 704	Pasar Besar Klang		
SA19	Jalan Meru		29 June 2026	Side	Elevated	N/A	KLG2A; 704	Kawasan 17		
SA20	Jambatan Kota		29 June 2026	Side	Elevated	✓	T722; T725	Klang / Pasar Jawa		700-metre walking distance to KD14 Klang on the KTM Tanjung Malim-Port Klang Line
SA21	Taman Selatan		29 June 2026	Island	Elevated	N/A	T703; T721; KLG1; 707; 730; 734	Hospital Tengku Ampuan Rahimah		
SA22	Seri Andalas		29 June 2026	Side	Elevated	✓		Seri Andalas		
SA23	Klang Jaya		29 June 2026	Island	Elevated	N/A	T719	Lotus's Bukit Tinggi / Bukit Tinggi		
SA24	Bandar Bukit Tinggi		29 June 2026	Island	Elevated	✓		AEON Bukit Tinggi / Batu Nilam		
SA25	Bandar Botanik		2031	Side	Elevated			Bandar Botanik		Future in-fill station.
SA26	Johan Setia		29 June 2026	Island	Elevated	✓		Johan Setia	Western terminus.	

== Rolling stock ==
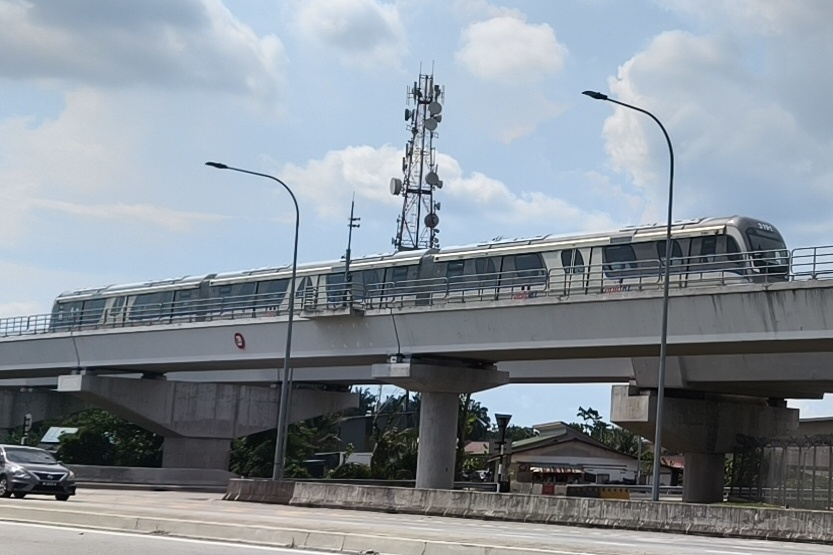
Shah Alam line train track near Johan Setia LRT station

=== 3-car CRRC rolling stock ===
The Shah Alam line's fleet consists of 22 3-car trainsets from CRRC Zhuzhou. Operating at minimum headway frequencies, the fleet is capable of a maximum capacity of 18,630 passengers per hour per direction (pphpd) and is projected to carry 67,000 passengers per day once commercial service commences.

In 2024, it was announced that an additional seven 3-car trainsets would be added to the fleet by the end of 2027 as part of the cabinet's project scope restoration and the reinstatement of five previously shelved stations.

=== Rolling stock formation ===
The rolling stock consists of fully automated, driverless 3-car Light Rail Vehicles (LRVs) operating under Grade of Automation 4 (GoA4). Each trainset is configured in a three-car formation consisting of two motorized driving cars (Mc) sandwiching a middle unmotorized trailer car (T).

Car Position	Car Type	Driver's Cab	Traction Motors	Key Equipment & Operational Notes
Car 1	Mc1 (Motor Car)	No (Automated)	Yes	Trailing motor car housing automatic train control (ATC) equipment and propulsion systems.
Car 2	T (Trailer Car)	No	No	Center unmotorized trailer car housing static inverters (SIV) and primary air compressors.
Car 3	Mc2 (Motor Car)	No (Automated)	Yes	Leading motor car housing automatic train control (ATC) equipment and propulsion systems.

==== Fleet details ====
- Configuration: Mc1 – T – Mc2
- Total fleet size: 29 trainsets (22 delivered initially + 7 ordered for 2027 delivery).
- Automation level: Driverless GoA4 technology without physical driver compartments, optimizing passenger panoramic views at the front and rear ends of the train.

==== Future expansion and platform proofing ====
- Station platform future-proofing: All physical station platforms along the Shah Alam Line were built to a length capable of accommodating up to a 4-car trainset configuration in the future. This prevents costly infrastructure modifications or demolition down the line if demand scales up.
- Current strategy focus: Despite the 4-car physical capability of the stations, all current supplemental rolling stock orders (including the 7 additional trainsets arriving by 2027) will remain strictly as 3-car trainsets. Prasarana's immediate plan for handling line demand growth relies entirely on reducing wait times and running higher-frequency headways with the 3-car sets.
- Long-term 4-Car adjustments: The purchase of additional intermediate trailer cars to expand the existing fleet into a 4-car configuration will only be considered as a secondary phase in the future. This upgrade will only be triggered if rider capacity requirements grow to a point that high-frequency 3-car operations can no longer cope with peak travel demands.

=== Technical specifications ===
The rolling stock consists of lightweight, high-strength aluminum alloy car bodies engineered specifically with a narrow-profile cross-section to accommodate the line's infrastructure constraints.

Parameter	Specification	Notes
Total train length	57.60 m (189.0 ft)	End-to-end for a fully coupled 3-car formation (configured as Mc1–T–Mc2).
Individual car length	~19.2 m (63.0 ft)	Average per car body (~20 m overall including couplers).
Car width	2.65 m (8 ft 8 in)	Narrow-profile design tailored for medium-capacity transit infrastructure.
Car height	3.44 m (11 ft 3 in)	From top of rail head to vehicle roof line.
Track gauge	1,435 mm (4 ft 8 1/2 in)	Standard gauge.
Maximum operational speed	80 km/h (50 mph)	Commercial service cruising limit (Design speed capability up to 80 km/h).
Power supply	750 V DC	Power traction delivered via a bottom-contact third rail system.

=== Interior layout and seating configuration ===
The interior design optimizes passenger flow and maximizes standing room to meet the line's peak-direction throughput requirements.

- Seating arrangement: Longitudinal perimeter seating (bench-style seating aligned flat against the cabin walls facing inward). This creates a wide central aisle to ease passenger boarding and offloading.
- Seating material: Ergonomically contoured, cantilevered modular plastic seats designed for easy cleaning and high durability.
- Gangway configuration: Fully open, continuous walkthrough gangways connect all three cars (inter-car accessibility), allowing passengers to move freely across the entire length of the train to distribute crowding evenly.
- Accessibility (Disabled-friendly features):
  - Dedicated wheelchair and stroller mooring spaces equipped with safety backpads and grab straps.
  - Level-boarding thresholds designed to match seamless platform edge interfaces.
- Passenger amenities:
  - Overhead longitudinal dynamic LED/LCD Passenger Information Displays (PIDS) providing real-time route maps, upcoming station announcements, and door opening orientation.
  - High-capacity, roof-mounted climate control HVAC units calibrated specifically for tropical environments.

=== Passenger capacity ===
The trains are engineered as a medium-capacity transit system designed to maintain high frequencies during peak commute hours.

Condition	Capacity per 3-car Trainset
Normal Passenger Load	~624 passengers
Crush Passenger Load	Up to 900+ passengers

== Ridership ==
The line recorded 58,865 ridership on the first day of operations.

Shah Alam Line Ridership
Year	Month/Quarter	Ridership	Annual Ridership	Change (%)	Note
2026	Q4	1,004,534	5,198,024	-	As of October 2026
2026	Q3	4,079,915	5,198,024	-	
2026	Q2	113,575	5,198,024	-	Opened on 29 June 2026
2026	Q1	-	5,198,024	-	

== Other information ==
- Initially, the Klang LRT station (now Jambatan Kota) was planned as an interchange station with the Klang Komuter station. However, due to cost-reduction efforts and objections from Little India Klang business residents, the station was built beside Emporium Makan and Shaw Centrepoint Mall, 700 meters away from the KTM Komuter station. This would have resulted in a same-name but different stations situation, similar to Salak Selatan LRT/KTM and Sentul LRT/KTM stations. The station has since been given a new name.
- The line is connected with 4 retail malls and shopping centres; namely, One Utama mall in Petaling Jaya, and the Shaw Center Point (The Store), Lotus's Klang (formerly TESCO Bukit Tinggi) and ÆON Bukit Tinggi Shopping Centre in Klang.
- The trains will have a maximum operating speed of 80 km/h (17% faster than the current LRT Kelana Jaya Line) with the capacity of carrying 36,720 passengers per hour per direction.

== Gallery ==
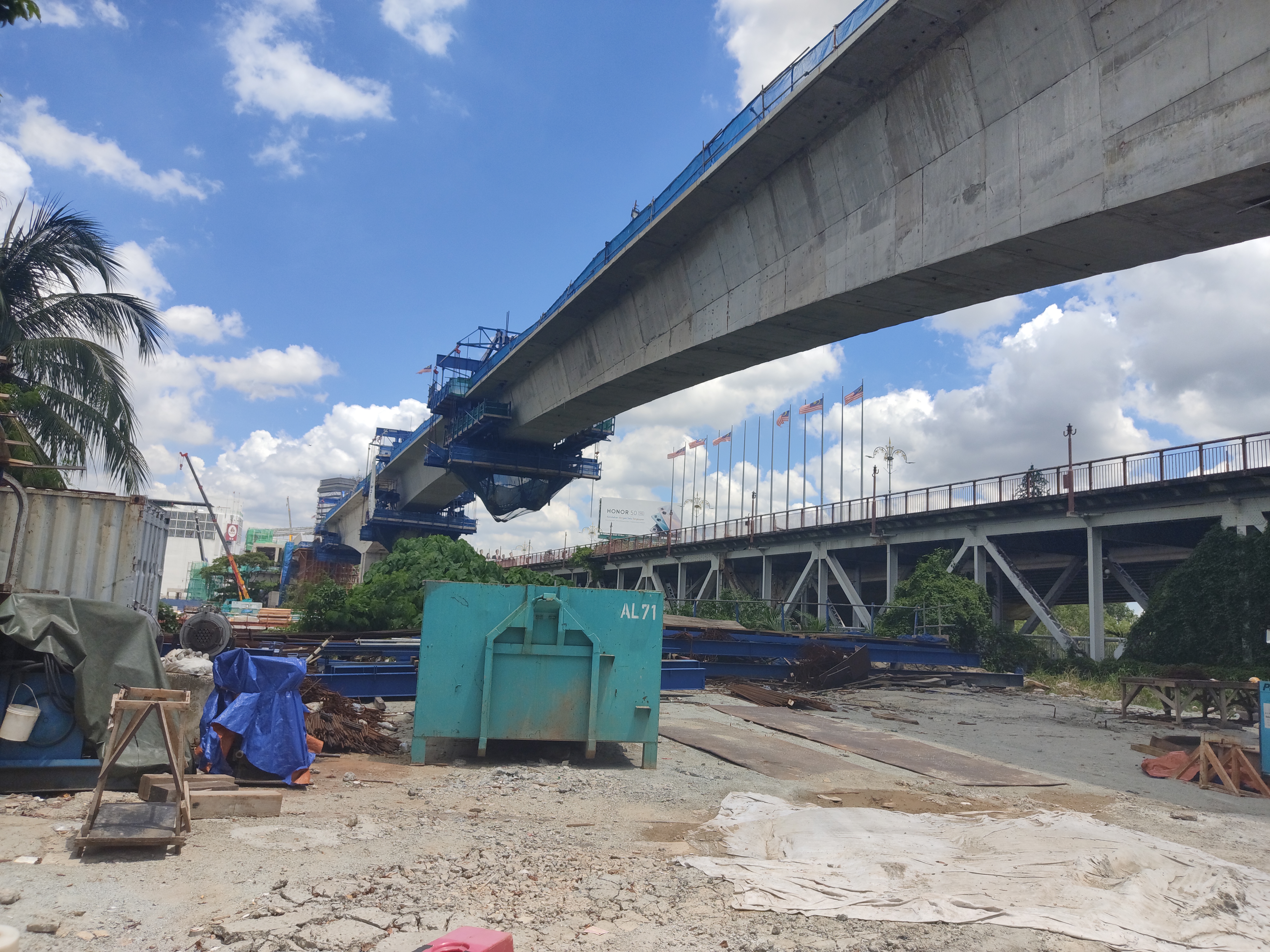
Elevated LRT3 crossing under construction over the Klang River, running parallel with Kota Bridge, 2021.

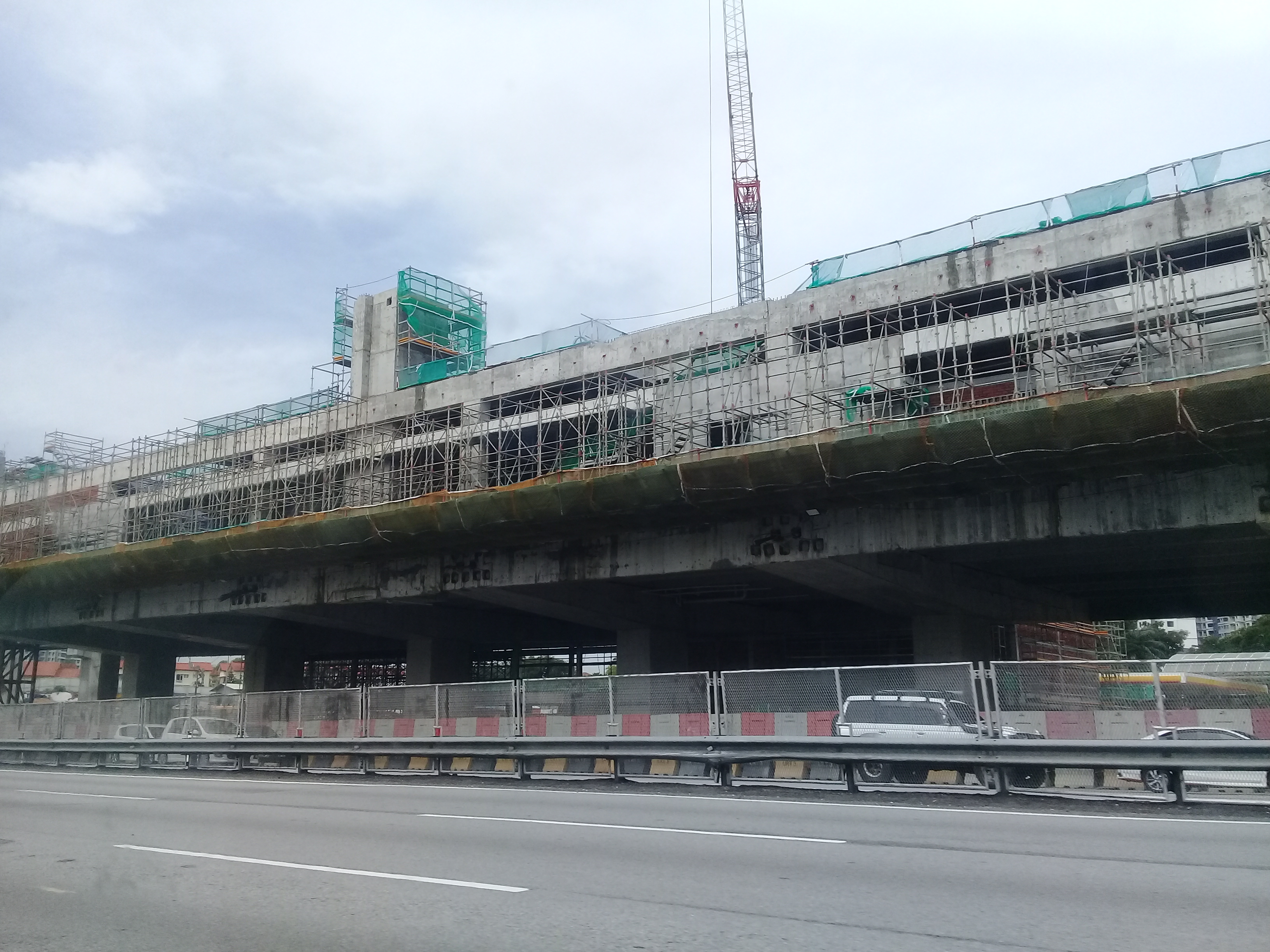
The Damansara Idaman LRT station under construction, 2022.

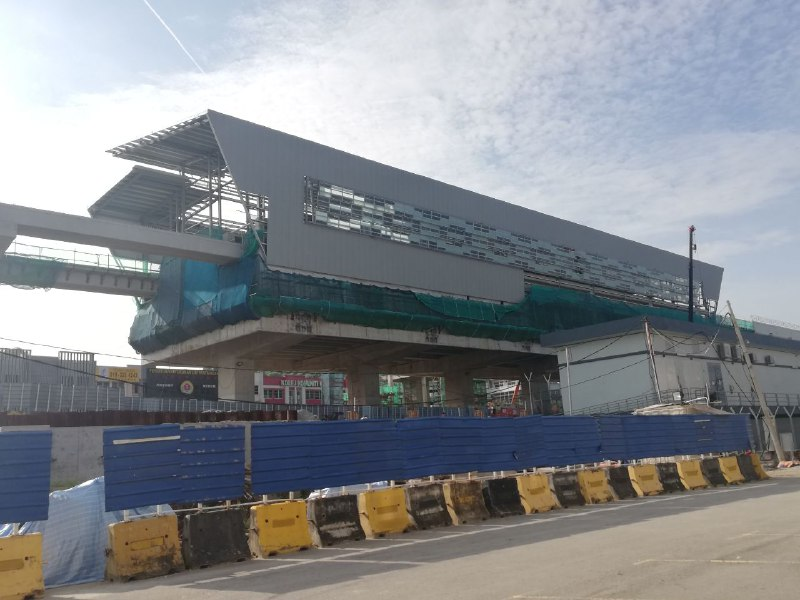
The exterior of Taman Selatan station in 2021.

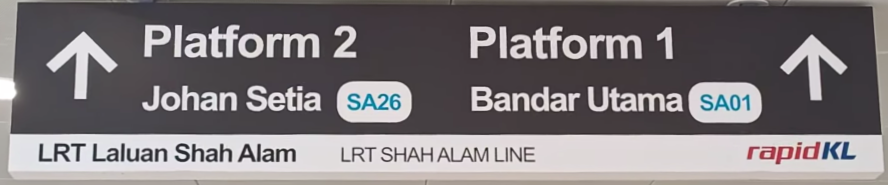
A sign showing the destination of trains for each platform
