= Seksyen 7 Shah Alam LRT station =

Metro station in Shah Alam, Selangor, Malaysia

SA15 Seksyen 7 Shah Alam – Pet World
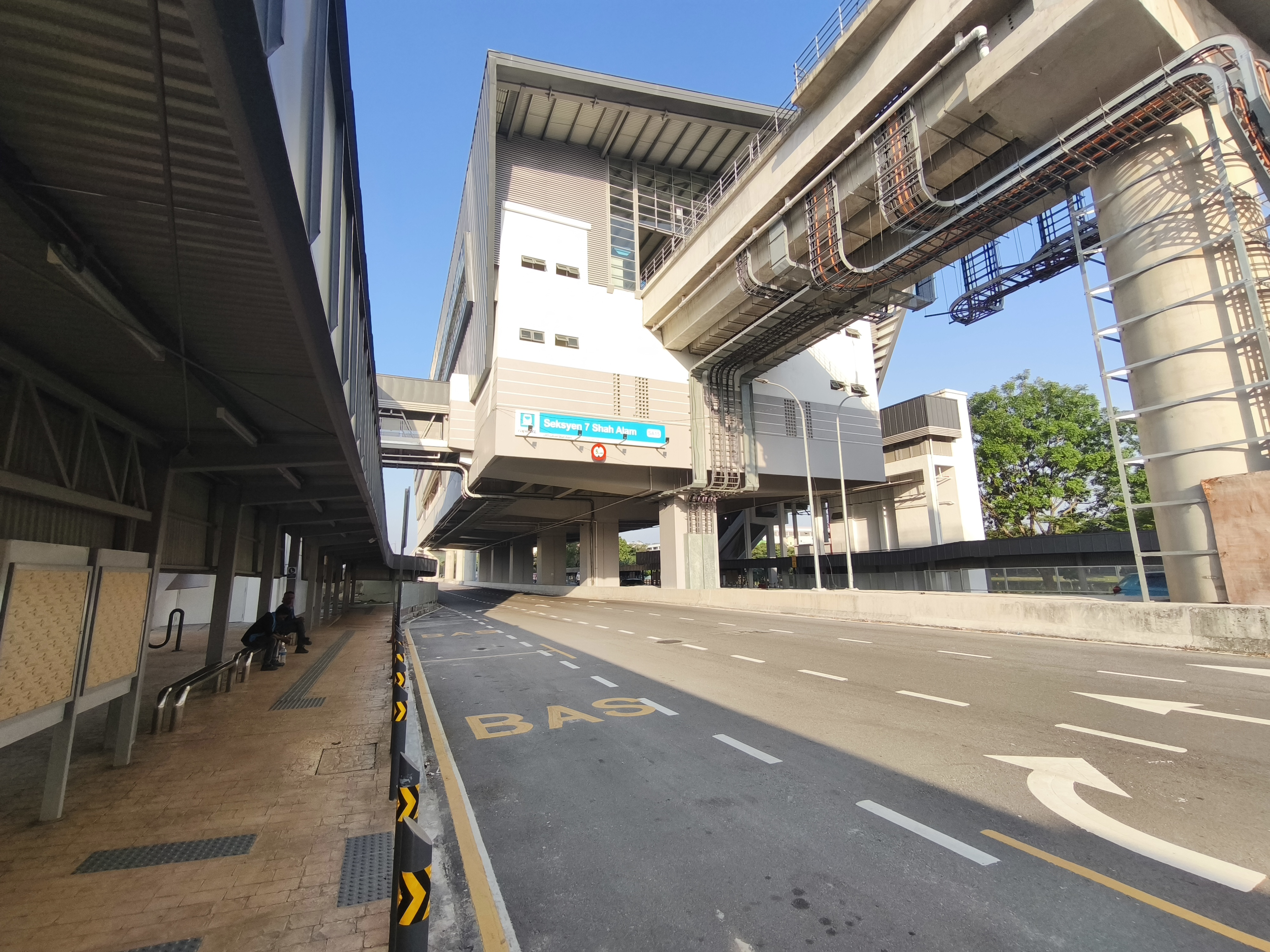
- The station from Entrance B

General information
- Other names: Malay: سيکشن توجوه شاه عالم (Jawi); Chinese: 莎阿南第七区; Tamil: செக்சன் 7 சா ஆலாம்
- Location: Persiaran Permai, Section 7, 40450 Shah Alam, Selangor; Malaysia
- System: Rapid KL
- Owner: Prasarana Malaysia
- Operator: Rapid Rail
- Line: 11 Shah Alam Line
- Platforms: 2 side platforms
- Tracks: 2

Construction
- Structure type: Elevated
- Parking: Not available
- Cycle facilities: Not available
- Accessible: Yes

Other information
- Status: Operational
- Station code: SA15

History
- Opened: 29 June 2026; 4 months ago
- Former names: i-City/Hospital Shah Alam

Services
Preceding station		Following station
UiTM Shah Alam towards Bandar Utama	Shah Alam Line	Bandar Baru Klang towards Johan Setia
UiTM Shah Alam towards Bandar Utama	Shah Alam Line Future service	Bukit Raja Selatan towards Johan Setia
Location

The Seksyen 7 Shah Alam LRT station (interim name: i-City/Hospital Shah Alam), or Seksyen 7 Shah Alam–Pet World under the station naming rights programme, is a elevated light rapid transit (LRT) station that serves the Seksyen 7 in Shah Alam, Selangor, Malaysia. It serves as one of the stations on the Shah Alam line. It is an elevated rapid transit station forming part of the Klang Valley Integrated Transit System.

== History ==
This is the fifteenth station along the RM9 billion line project, with the line's maintenance depot located in Johan Setia, Klang. It has facilities such as public parking, kiosks, restrooms, elevators, taxi stands, and feeder buses. Operations for the Shah Alam line and this station commenced on 29 June 2026.

== Locality landmarks ==
The station is located on top of Persiaran Permai, near the T-junction of i-City, in Section 7 Shah Alam. To the west of the station are Persiaran Bestari, Jalan Plumbum 7/98, and Jalan Plumbum 7/102—and to the east, Persiaran Kayangan and Jalan Plumbum 7/100. Nearby landmarks include:

- Hospital Shah Alam (900m walk)
- Medan Selera Seksyen 7 (150m walk)
- I-City Shah Alam (650m walk)
- Central I-City Shopping Mall (900m walk via CentralWalk i-City)
- Pusat Komersial Jalan Plumbum (350m walk)
- Giant Seksyen 7 Shah Alam (750m walk)
- UiTM Gate 2, Akademi Pengajian Bahasa (via Smart Selangor bus)
- Laman Seni 7
- Jakel Shah Alam
- Apartment PKNS Seksyen 7
- University of Selangor
- SJK (T) Ladang Midlands (an elementary school that retains the historical estate name of this area)

== Station Features ==
The station adopts the standard elevated station design for the Shah Alam Line, with one island platform above the concourse level and two entrances/exits on ground level, below the concourse. There are also facilities designed for the disabled, including tactile floor blocks, disabled toilets, braille on elevator buttons, and low-height elevator buttons and customer service counters for wheelchair users.

=== Station layout ===
L2	Platform; Level	→ Platform 1: 11 Shah Alam Line towards SA01 Bandar Utama (UiTM Shah Alam)
L2	Platform; Level	Side platform, doors will open on the left
L2	Platform; Level	← Platform 2: 11 Shah Alam Line towards SA26 Johan Setia (Bandar Baru Klang)
L1	Concourse	Faregates to paid area, escalators, lifts, ticketing machines, kiosks, customer service counter
G	Ground Level	Feeder Bus Stop, Taxi Lay-By

=== Exits and entrances ===
The station has two entrances. Entrance A is situated on the northern side of the Persiaran Permai and nearby the Midlands Convention Centre. Entrance B is situated on the southern side of the Persiaran Permai, next to the T-junction intersection to i-City and the southern Section 7 lake. Both entrances serve the Section 7 commercial area.

Shah Alam Line station
Entrance	Location	Destination	Picture
A	Northern side of Persiaran Permai	Feeder bus stop, taxi and private vehicle lay-by Midlands Convention Centre, Section 7 Food Court, Section 7 Commercial Area (north section), Shah Alam Hospital, Section 7 Health Clinic, UiTM Shah Alam (gate 2)	
B	Southern side of Persiaran Permai	Feeder bus stop, taxi and private vehicle lay-by i-City, Wyndham Garden i-City, Section 7 Commercial Area (south section), UiTM Shah Alam (gate 2)	

== Connectivity ==
=== Feeder buses ===
	Origin	Destination	Via	Connecting to	Notes
T765	SA15 Seksyen 7 Shah Alam (Entrance B)	Pangsapuri Danumas via UiTM Shah Alam			

=== Other buses ===
	Origin	Destination	Via	Connecting to	Notes
753	Hentian Pusat Bandar Shah Alam	UiTM Puncak Alam	UiTM Shah Alam; SA15 Seksyen 7 Shah Alam (Entrance A); Federal Highway; Jalan Meru; Setia City Mall		Only to UiTM Puncak Alam bound via Setia Alam/Meru
SA01	KD11 Shah Alam Komuter station	Seksyen 7 Shah Alam	SA15 Seksyen 7 Shah Alam (Entrance A)		
SA04	Terminal 17 Shah Alam	Hospital Shah Alam	SA15 Seksyen 7 Shah Alam (Entrance B)		

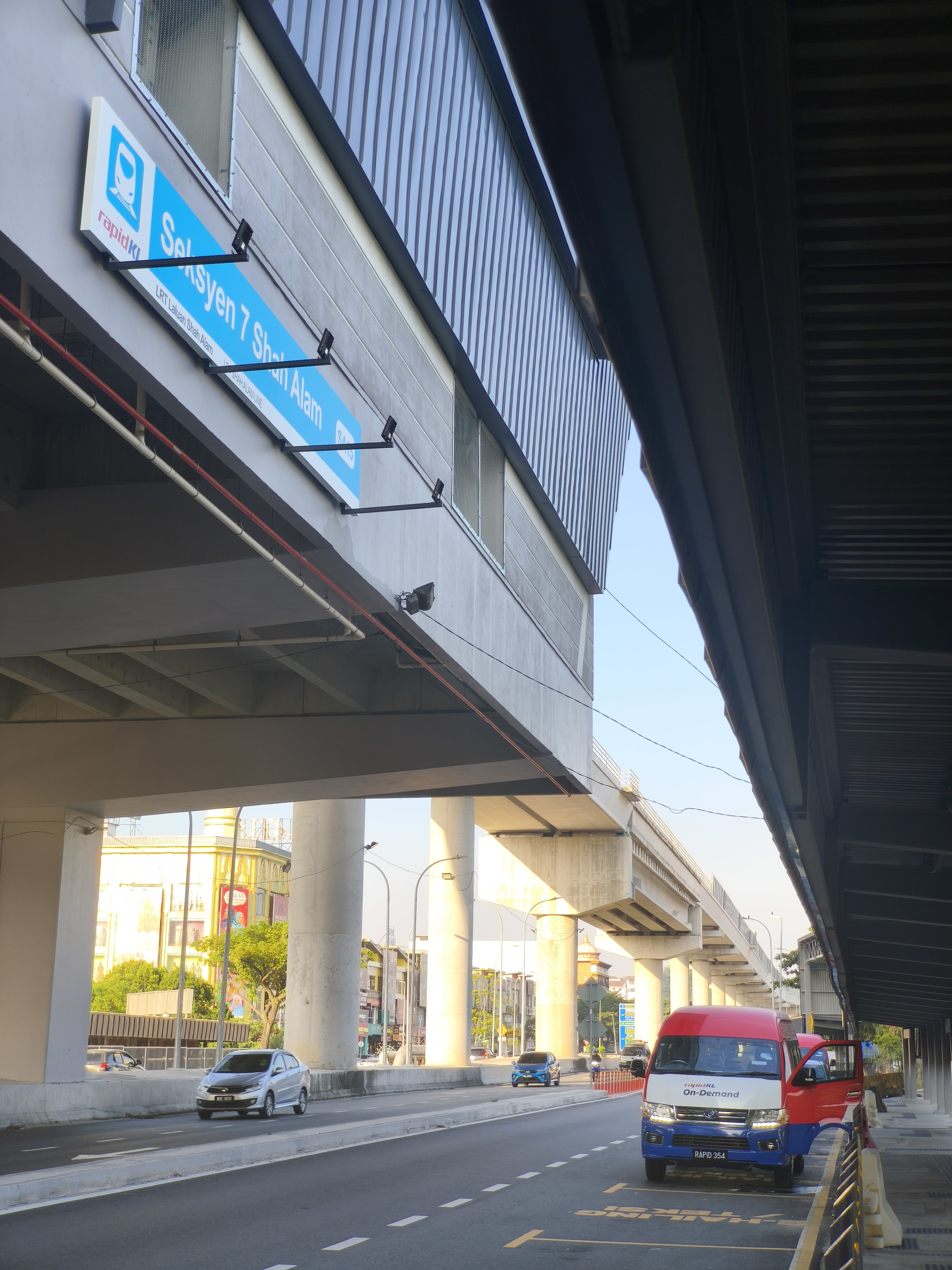
A Rapid KL On-Demand van is waiting at Entrance B, serving trips to U12 Cahaya Alam

Current bus services include Smart Selangor bus route SA04 (to i-City & Padang Jawa), SA01 (to KTM Shah Alam via Hospital Shah Alam and Seksyen 2), Rapid KL bus route 753 (to UiTM Puncak Alam only via Setia Alam/Meru) and LRT feeder bus route T765 (to Pangsapuri Danumas).

Rapid KL On-Demand DRT (Demand Responsive Transit) feeder vans are also available, serving the following zones:

- LRT Seksyen 7 – U12 Cahaya Alam
- KTM Padang Jawa – Seksyen 7
