= Tropicana LRT station =

Rapid-transit station in Malaysia

SA04 Tropicana
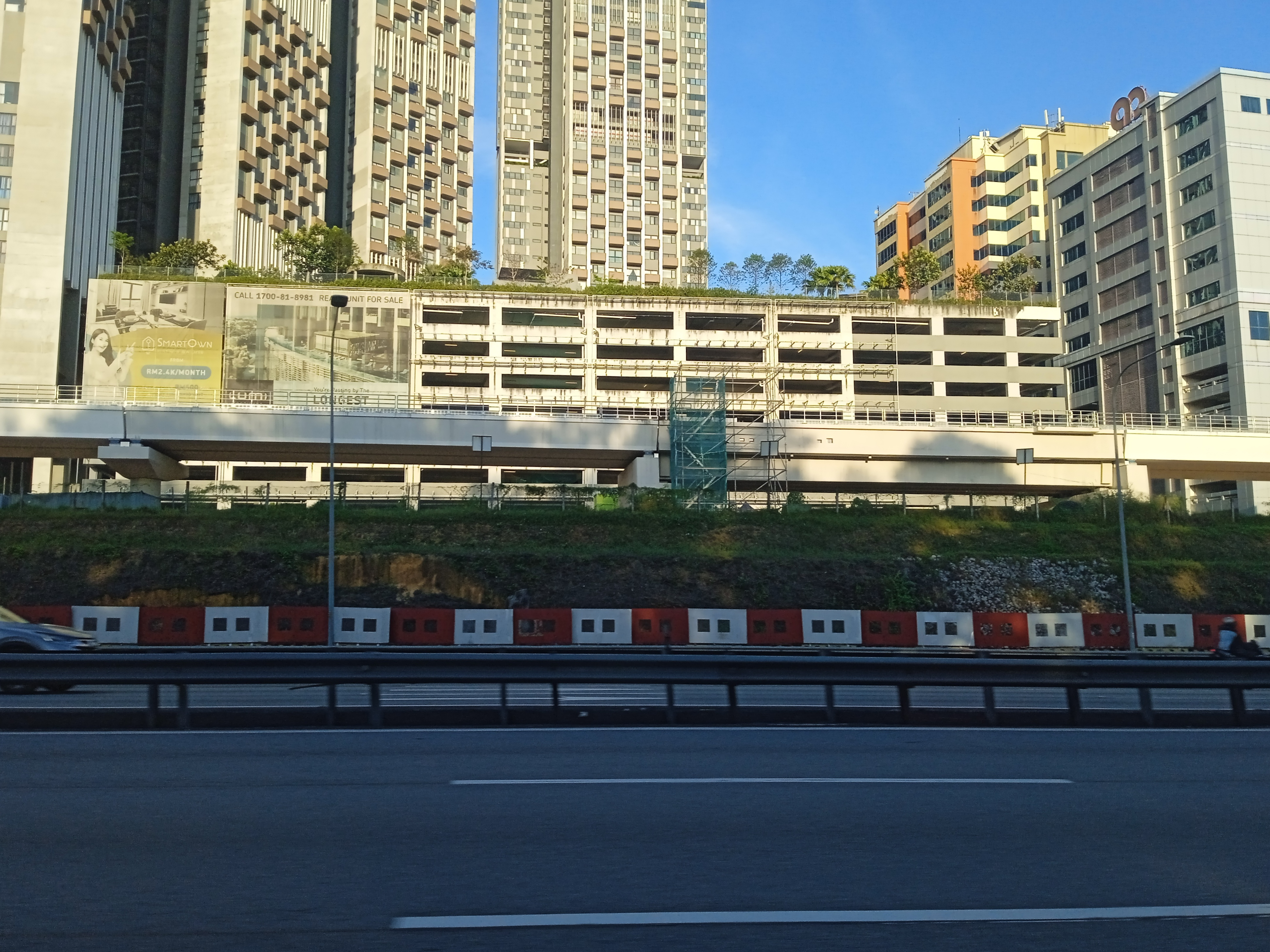

General information
- Location: Tropicana, Selangor; Malaysia
- System: | Future LRT station
- Owner: Prasarana Malaysia
- Operator: Rapid Rail
- Line: 11 Shah Alam
- Platforms: 2 side platforms
- Tracks: 2

Construction
- Structure type: Elevated
- Parking: Available

Other information
- Status: Under construction
- Station code: SA04

Services
Preceding station		Following station
BU 11 towards Bandar Utama	Shah Alam Line Future service	Damansara Idaman towards Johan Setia
Location

The Tropicana LRT station is a light rapid transit (LRT) station that is slated to serve the suburb of Tropicana, Selangor, Malaysia once it is built. It serves as one of the stations on the Shah Alam line. The station is located near Menara Lien Hoe and New Klang Valley Expressway.

The station was under provisional status due to budgetary cuts made during the change of the Malaysian government in 2018. However, on 13 October 2023, during the Budget 2024 presentation, Finance Minister Dato' Seri Anwar Ibrahim announced the reintegration of the five stations that were previously under provisional status including the Tropicana LRT station to be built alongside the rest of the Shah Alam Line.
