= Temasya LRT station =

Railway station in Shah Alam, Malaysia

SA08 Temasya

General information
- Other names: Malay: تماش (Jawi)
- Location: Temasya, Shah Alam, Selangor; Malaysia
- System: | Future LRT station
- Owner: Prasarana Malaysia
- Operator: Rapid Rail
- Line: 11 Shah Alam
- Platforms: 2 side platforms
- Tracks: 2

Construction
- Parking: Available

Other information
- Status: Under construction
- Station code: SA08

Services
Preceding station		Following station
Glenmarie towards Bandar Utama	Shah Alam Line Future service	Kerjaya towards Johan Setia
Location

The Temasya LRT station is a light rapid transit (LRT) station under construction that will serve the suburbs of Temasya and Glenmarie in Selangor, Malaysia. It serves as one of the stations on the Shah Alam Line. The station is located at Persiaran Kerjaya near a junctions of Jalan Pengaturcaraan.

The station was under provisional status due to budgetary cuts made during the change of the Malaysian government in 2018. However, on 13 October 2023, during the Budget 2024 presentation, Finance Minister Dato' Seri Anwar Ibrahim announced the reintegration of the five stations that were previously under provisional status including the Temasya LRT station to be built alongside the rest of the Shah Alam Line.

== Surrounding Developments ==
Major landmarks and developments in the vicinity of this Station:

- Persiaran Kerjaya
- Temasya Suria commercial district
- Temasya Suria Glenmarie Residence
- Masjid An Nur Temasya Glenmarie
