= Bandar Bukit Tinggi LRT station =

Railway station in Klang, Malaysia

SA24 Bandar Bukit Tinggi
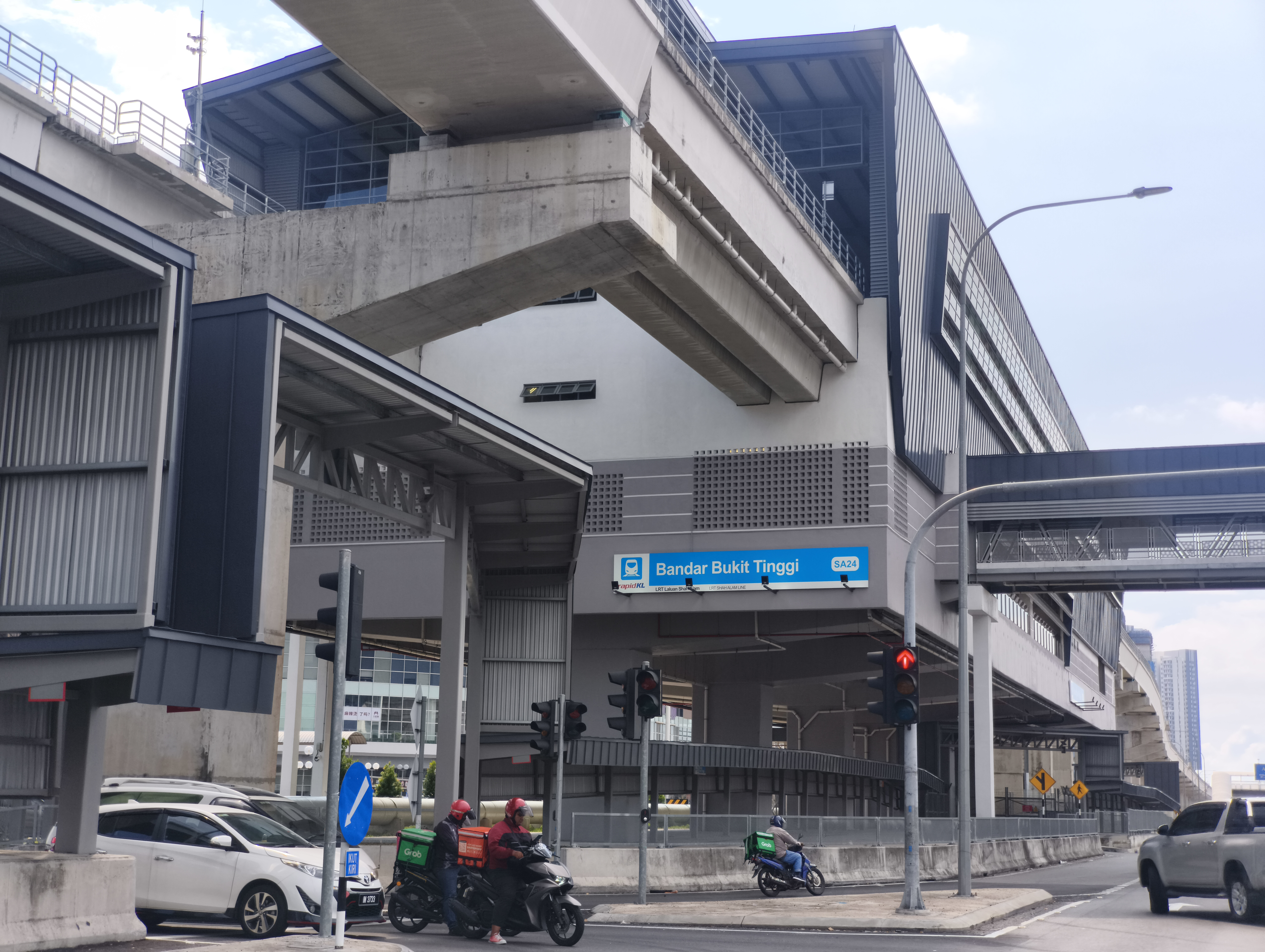

General information
- Other names: Malay: باندر بوکيت تيڠݢي (Jawi); Chinese: 武吉丁宜镇; Tamil: பண்டார் புக்கிட் திங்கி
- Location: Bandar Bukit Tinggi, Klang, Selangor; Malaysia
- System: Rapid KL
- Owner: Prasarana Malaysia
- Operator: Rapid Rail
- Line: 11 Shah Alam Line
- Platforms: 1 island platform
- Tracks: 2

Construction
- Structure type: Elevated
- Parking: Available, 600 parking bays.
- Accessible: Yes

Other information
- Station code: SA24

History
- Opened: 29 June 2026; 4 months ago

Services
Preceding station		Following station
Klang Jaya towards Bandar Utama	Shah Alam Line	Johan Setia Terminus
Klang Jaya towards Bandar Utama	Shah Alam Line Future service (2031)	Bandar Botanik towards Johan Setia
Location

The Bandar Bukit Tinggi LRT station (also known as AEON Bukit Tinggi during its planning stage) is an elevated light rapid transit station in Bandar Bukit Tinggi, Klang, Selangor, Malaysia, forming part of the Shah Alam line.

This is the twenty-fourth station along the RM9 billion line project, with the line's maintenance depot located in Johan Setia, Klang. It has facilities such as park and ride, kiosks, restrooms, escalators, elevators, taxi stands, and bus stands.

The Shah Alam line, and therefore this station, began operations on 29 June 2026.

== Locality landmarks ==
Major landmarks around Bandar Bukit Tinggi LRT station include:

- AEON Bukit Tinggi Shopping Centre
- Bandar Bukit Tinggi 2
- The Canvas Hotel
- Bandar Botanic commercial area
- GM Klang Wholesale City
- The Landmark commercial area
- Impiria Residences

== Station Features ==
The station adopts the standard elevated station design for the Shah Alam Line, with one island platform above the concourse level and two entrances/exits. The station is located on the edge of Jalan Langat, which is part of Federal Route 5, and one the main roads serving the Bandar Bukit Tinggi township.

Like all the other stations on the Shah Alam line, the station has facilities designed for the disabled, including tactile floor blocks, disabled toilets, braille on elevator buttons, and low-height floor buttons and customer service centre counters for wheelchair users. There is a Park N' Ride facility at this station which can accommodate up to 600 vehicles.

=== Station layout ===
L2	Platform; Level	→ Platform 1: 11 Shah Alam Line towards SA01 Bandar Utama (Klang Jaya)
L2	Platform; Level	Island platform, doors will open on the right
L2	Platform; Level	← Platform 2: 11 Shah Alam Line towards SA26 Johan Setia
L1	Concourse	Faregates to paid area, escalators, lifts, ticketing machines, kiosks, customer service counter
G	Ground Level	Park N' Ride, Feeder Bus Stop, Taxi Lay-By

=== Exits and entrances ===
The station has two entrances. Entrance A is situated on the western edge of Jalan Langat which also connects commuters towards the AEON Bukit Tinggi Shopping centre via a staircase in the middle of the over road pedestrian bridge which leads to a grass patch in front of AEON Bukit Tinggi Shopping Centre. Entrance B is situated across and on the eastern side of Jalan Langat and connects commuters to the Ambang Botanik commercial area. Both entrances are connected to their individual Park N' Ride zones.

Shah Alam Line station
Entrance	Location	Destination	Picture
A	Western side of Jalan Langat	Feeder bus stop, taxi and private vehicle lay-by Park N' Ride; AEON Bukit Tinggi Shopping Centre	
B	Eastern side of Jalan Langat	Feeder bus stop, taxi and private vehicle lay-by Park N' Ride; Ambang Botanik Commercial Area	

== Bus Services ==
Rapid On-Demand (ROD) demand-responsive transit services are available, serving Bandar Bukit Tinggi 2, Bandar Botanic, and Bandar Puteri Klang.

For city bus services, this area is served by the Wawasan Sutera bus route 730 (to Klang and Banting).

Express bus services to KLIA is also available from AEON Bukit Tinggi.

== Gallery ==
Side outview of the station building under construction from AEON Bukit Tinggi in 2023

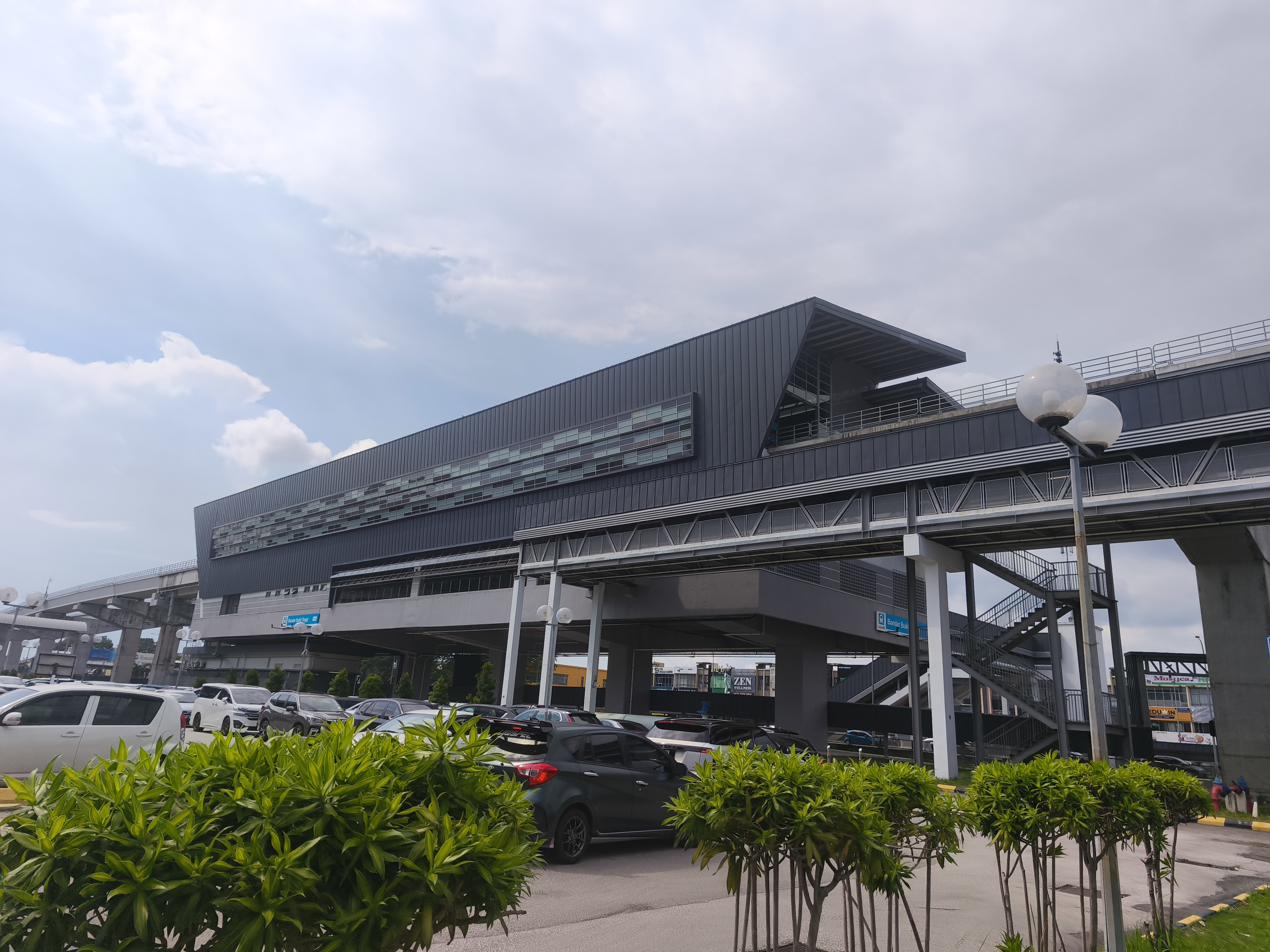
Close-up view of the station building from the southeastern area of AEON Bukit Tinggi
