= Kerjaya LRT station =

Metro station in Shah Alam, Malaysia

SA09 Kerjaya
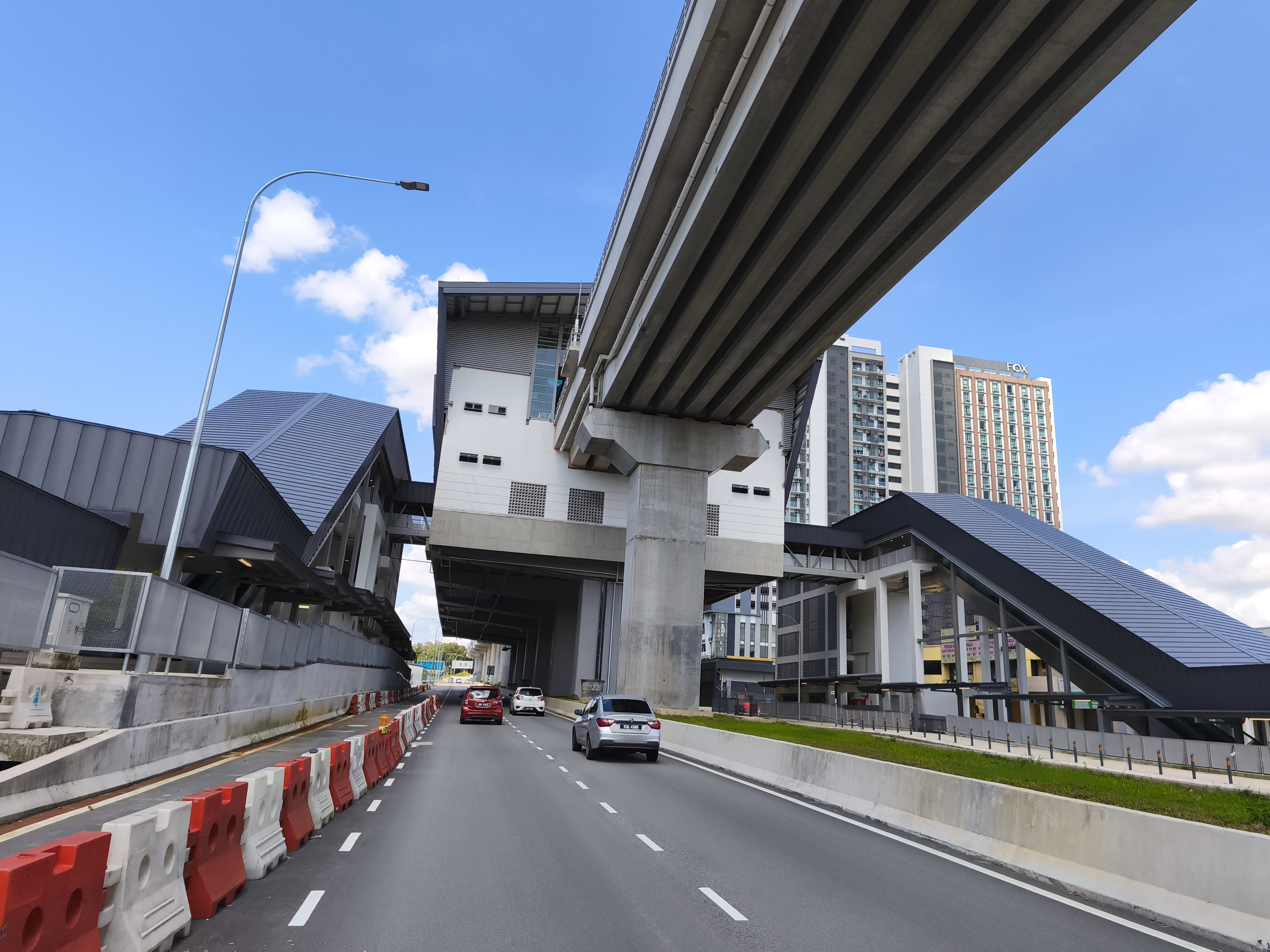

General information
- Other names: Malay: کرجاي (Jawi); Chinese: 格再也; Tamil: கெர்ஜயா
- Location: Glenmarie, Shah Alam, Selangor; Malaysia
- System: Rapid KL
- Owner: Prasarana Malaysia
- Operator: Rapid Rail
- Line: 11 Shah Alam Line
- Platforms: 2 side platforms
- Tracks: 2

Construction
- Structure type: Elevated
- Parking: Not available
- Accessible: Yes

Other information
- Station code: SA09

History
- Opened: 29 June 2026; 4 months ago

Services
Preceding station		Following station
Glenmarie 2 towards Bandar Utama	Shah Alam Line	Stadium Shah Alam towards Johan Setia
Temasya towards Bandar Utama	Shah Alam Line Future service (2031)	Stadium Shah Alam towards Johan Setia
Location

The Kerjaya LRT station is a light rapid transit (LRT) station that serve the suburb of Shah Alam in Selangor, Malaysia. It serves as one of the stations on the Shah Alam line, and is an elevated rapid transit station in Section U1 (Glenmarie), Shah Alam, Selangor, Malaysia; forming part of the Klang Valley Integrated Transit System.

The station is the ninth station along the RM9 billion line project, with the line's maintenance depot located in Johan Setia, Klang. It has facilities such as kiosks, restrooms, escalators, elevators, taxi stands, and feeder bus.

== Locality landmarks ==
The station is located close to the HICOM-Glenmarie Industrial Park, on top of Persiaran Kerjaya, which is part of the Malaysia Federal Route 3213, one of the main roads serving an industrial area in Shah Alam. To the east of the station is Jalan Hakim U1/24 and Jalan Batu Tiga Lama, and to the west, Jalan Kontraktor U1/14 and Jalan Juruterbang U1/38. Major landmarks around the station include:

- Politeknik Premier Sultan Salahuddin Abdul Aziz Shah
- HICOM-Glenmarie Industrial Park
- UOW-KDU University Malaysia
- The Glenz-Glenmarie Condominium
- Utropolis Marketplace Shopping Mall
- Utropolis Urbano residential
- Montfort Boys Town Training Institute
- Catholic Church of the Divine Mercy, Shah Alam
- Pangsapuri Sri Kerjaya
- Prima U1 Condominium

== Station Features ==
The station adopts the standard elevated station design for the Shah Alam Line, with two side platforms above the concourse level and two entrances/exits on the ground floor, below the concourse. There are also facilities designed for the disabled, including tactile paving, disabled toilets, braille on elevator buttons, and low-height elevator buttons and customer service centre counters for wheelchair users.

=== Station layout ===
L2	Platform; Level	Side platform, doors open on the right
L2	Platform; Level	→ Platform 1: 11 Shah Alam Line towards SA01 Bandar Utama (Glenmarie 2)
L2	Platform; Level	← Platform 2: 11 Shah Alam Line towards SA26 Johan Setia (Stadium Shah Alam)
L2	Platform; Level	Side platform, doors open on the right
L1	Concourse	Faregates to paid area, escalators, lifts, ticketing machines, kiosks, customer service counter
G	Ground Level	Feeder Bus Stop, Taxi Lay-By

=== Exits and entrances ===
The station has two entrances. Entrance A is situated on the northern side of the Persiaran Kerjaya and connects commuters towards the northwestern edge of the HICOM-Glenmarie Industrial Park, including Politeknik Premier Sultan Salahuddin Abdul Aziz Shah. Entrance B is situated on the southern side of the Persiaran Kerjaya and connects commuters to the commercial area of HICOM-Glenmarie.

Shah Alam Line station
Entrance	Location	Destination	Picture
A	Northern side of Persiaran Kerjaya	Feeder bus stop, taxi and private vehicle lay-by HICOM-Glenmarie Industrial Park; Politeknik Sultan Salahuddin Abdul Aziz Shah; Mercure Kuala Lumpur Glenmarie; Utropolis Glenmarie; UOW Malaysia	
B	Southern side of Persiaran Kerjaya	Feeder bus stop, taxi and private vehicle lay-by HICOM-Glenmarie Commercial Park; Temasya Industrial Park; The Glenz @ Glenmarie	

== Feeder Bus ==
Route No.	Origin	Destination	Via	Connecting to
T779	SA09 Kerjaya	Subang HiTech	Persiaran Kerjaya; Persiaran Jubli Perak; Persiaran Teknologi; Jalan Delima 1/1; Jalan MP 1 Jalan Delima 1/3; Persiaran Teknologi Subang; KD10 KTM Batu Tiga; Jalan Kontraktor U1/14; Jalan Juruukur U1/19; Jalan Pemaju U1/15; Jalan Hakim U1/24	SA02, SA07

== Gallery ==
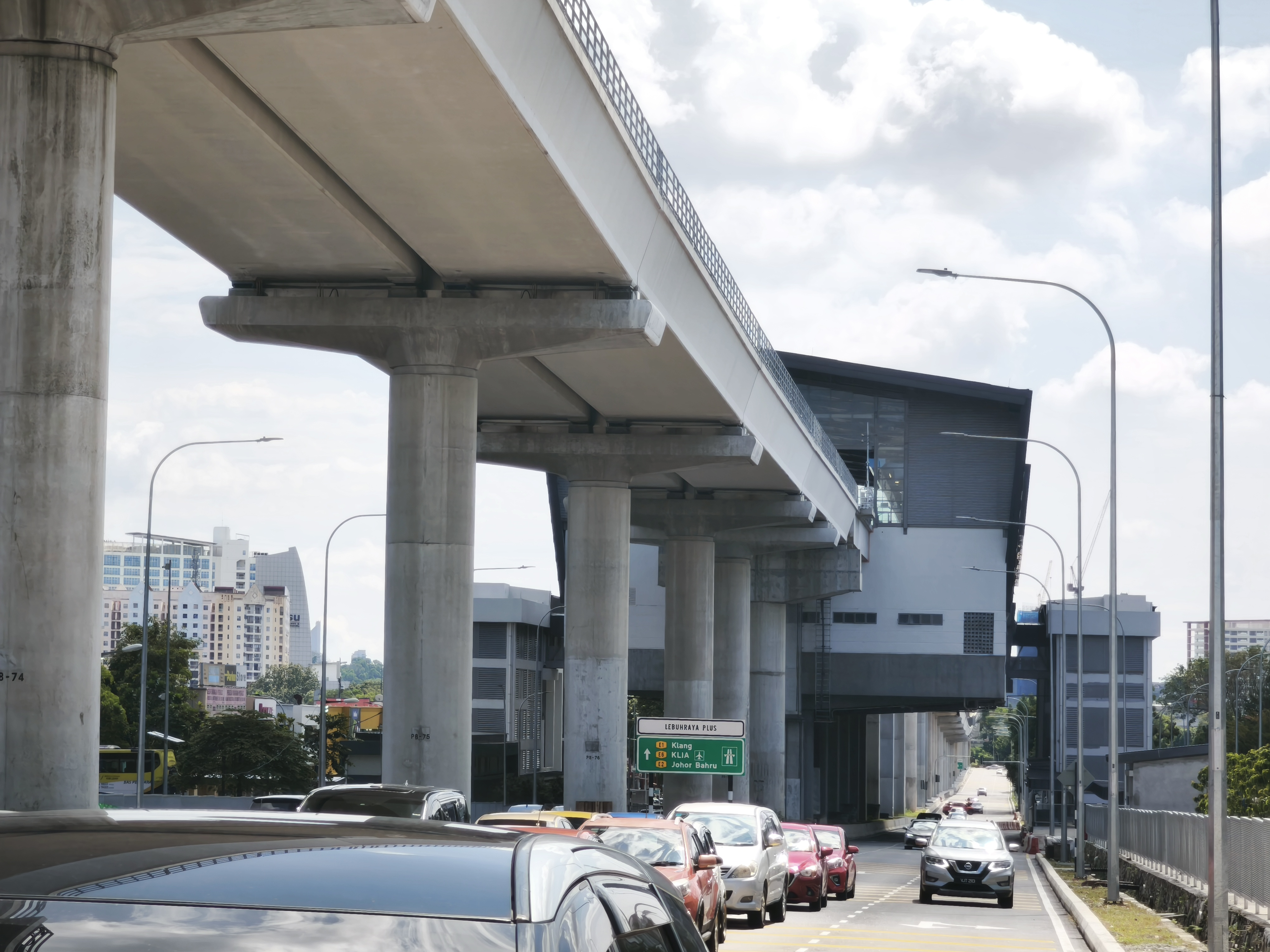
Westbound view of the station under construction in 2025

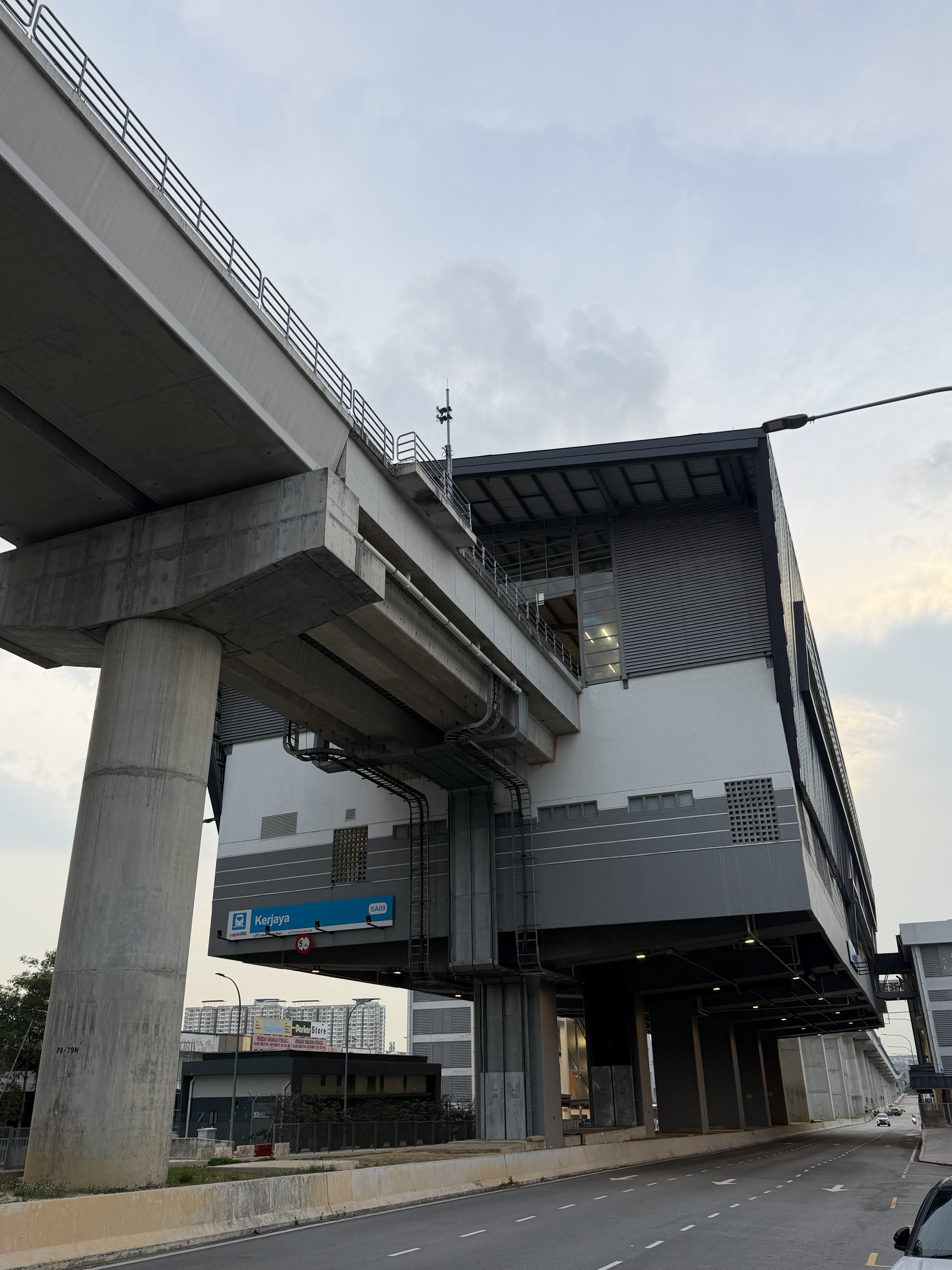
View of the station westbound in July 2026

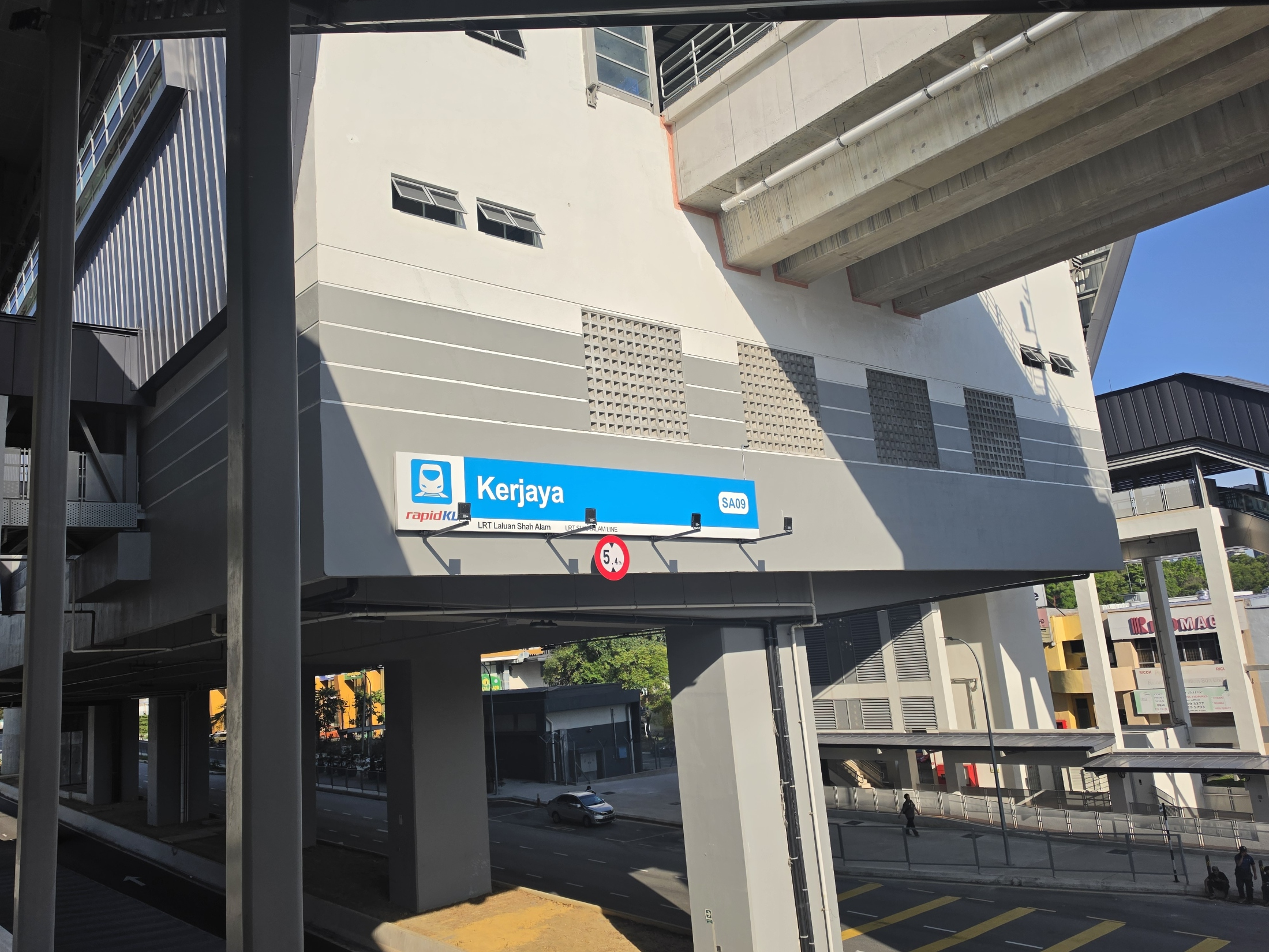
Close-up view of the station building from around the escalator area of Entrance A

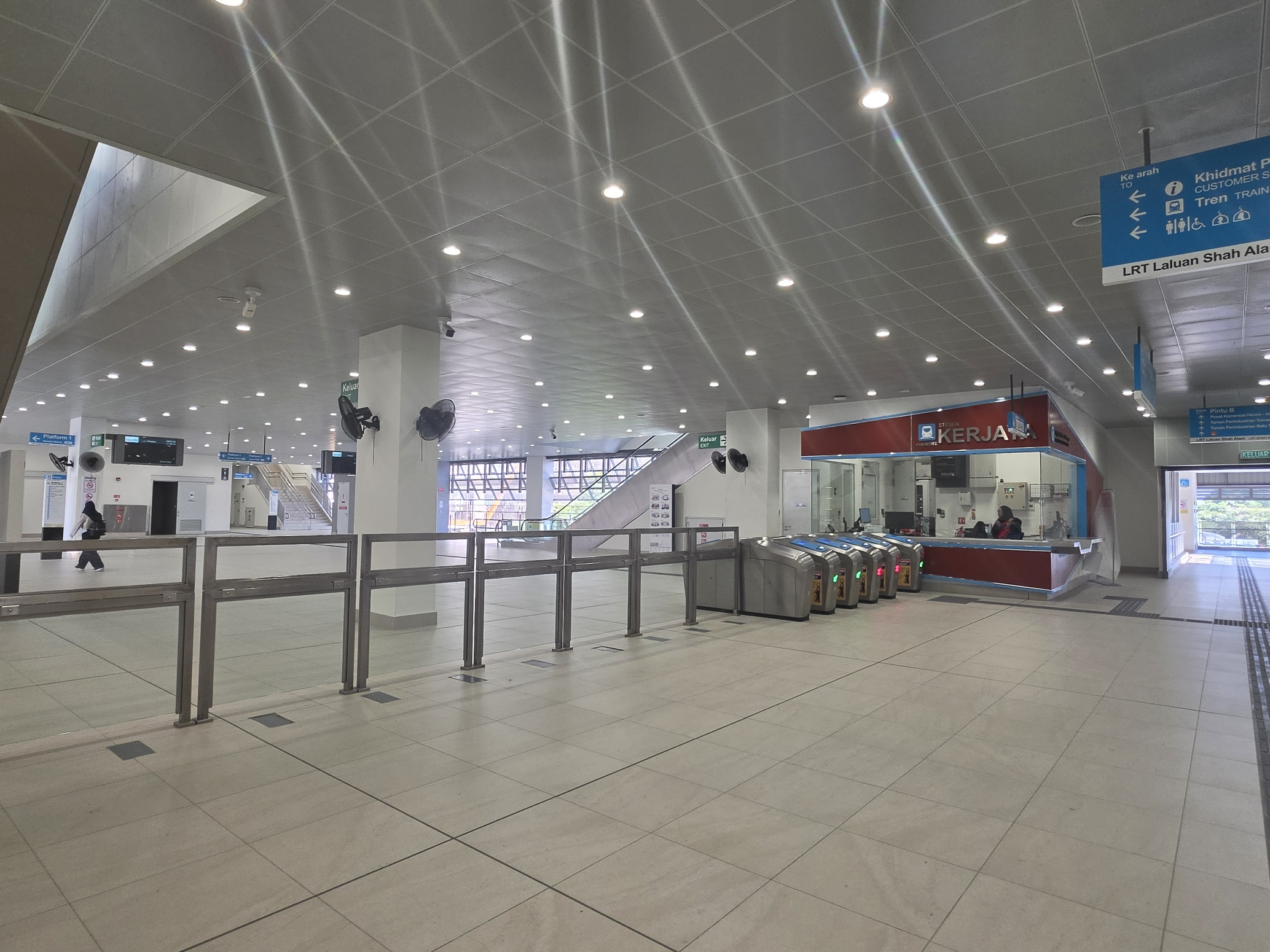
View of the station's concourse

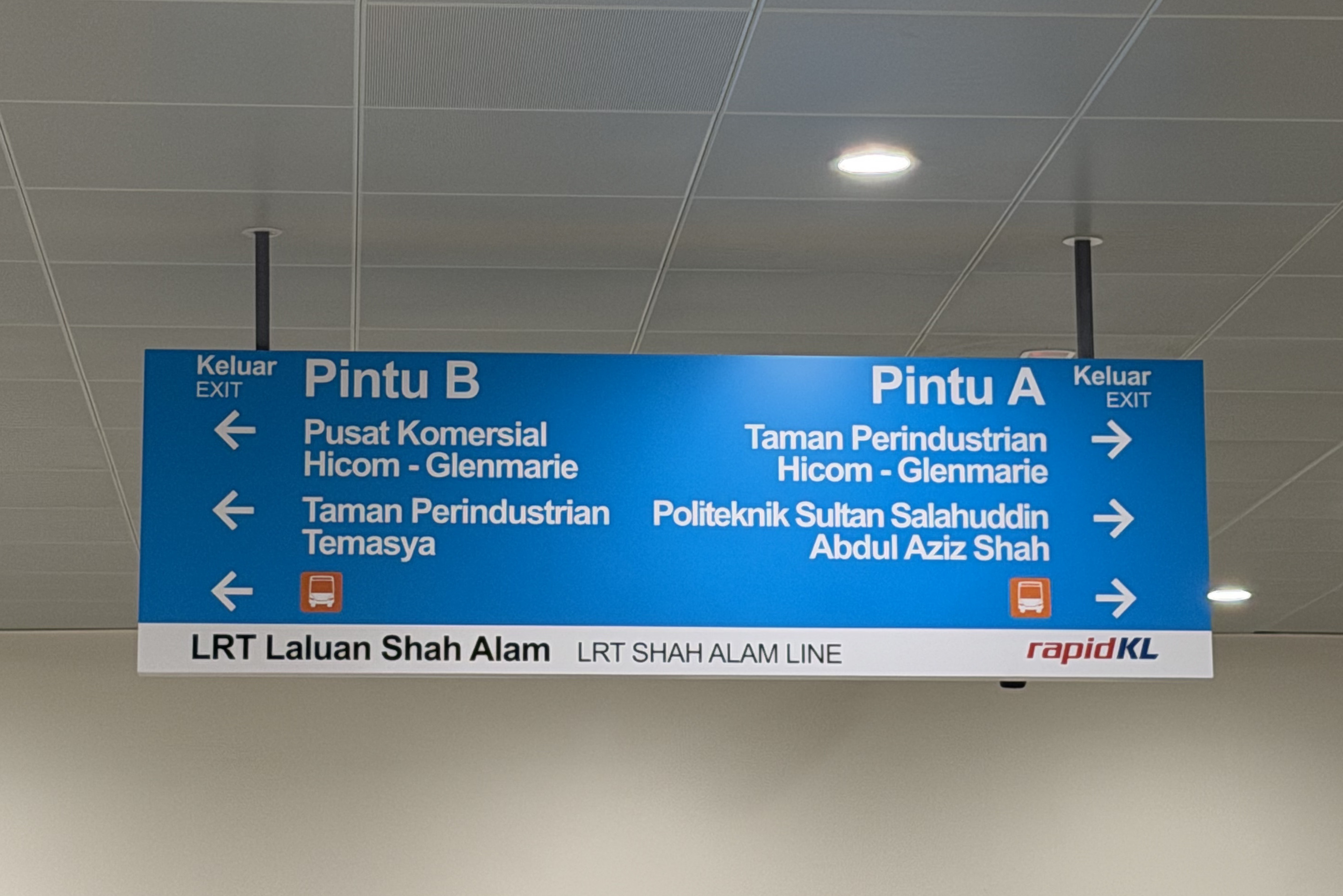
Exit signboard from the concourse area
