= Klang Jaya LRT station =

Railway station in Klang, Malaysia

SA23 Klang Jaya
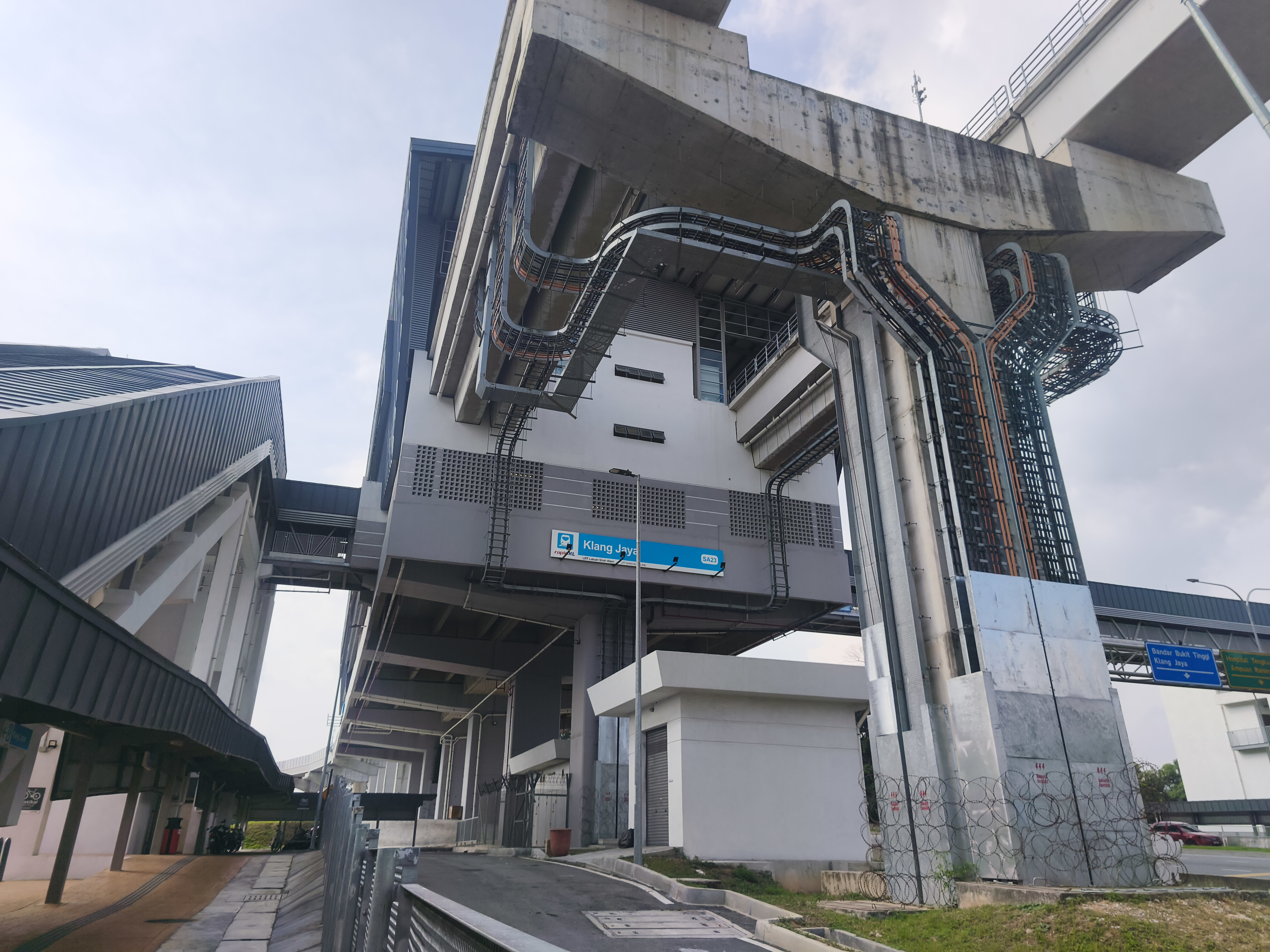

General information
- Other names: Malay: کلڠ جاي (Jawi); Chinese: 良木园; Tamil: கிள்ளான் ஜெயா
- Location: Bandar Bukit Tinggi, Klang, Selangor; Malaysia
- Coordinates: 3°00′20″N 101°26′31″E
- System: Rapid KL
- Owner: Prasarana Malaysia
- Operator: Rapid Rail
- Line: 11 Shah Alam Line
- Platforms: 1 island platform
- Tracks: 2

Construction
- Structure type: Elevated
- Parking: Not available
- Accessible: Yes

Other information
- Station code: SA23

History
- Opened: 29 June 2026; 4 months ago

Services
Preceding station		Following station
Seri Andalas towards Bandar Utama	Shah Alam Line	Bandar Bukit Tinggi towards Johan Setia
Location

The Klang Jaya LRT station (also known as Tesco Bukit Tinggi or Lotus's Bukit Tinggi during its planning stage) is an elevated light rapid transit station in Bandar Bukit Tinggi, Klang, Selangor, Malaysia, forming part of the Shah Alam line.

== History ==
This is the twenty-third station along the RM9 billion line project, with the line's maintenance depot located in Johan Setia, Klang. It has facilities such as kiosks, restrooms, elevators, taxi stands, and feeder buses. Operations for the Shah Alam line and this station commenced on 29 June 2026.

== Locality landmarks ==
This station is located to the west of Jalan Langat, which is part of Federal Route 5, and serves the Bandar Bukit Tinggi township. Major landmarks around this station include:

- Lotus's Klang
- Bandar Bukit Tinggi 1
- Première Hotel
- BBT One Twin Towers
- BBT One Boulevard commercial area
- SK Bandar Bukit Tinggi
- Trio Setia Klang
- Taman Desawan
- Taman Klang Jaya
- Taman Sentosa

== Station Features ==
Like all the other stations on the Shah Alam line, this station adopts the elevated station design. There is one island platform above the concourse and two entrances/exits below the concourse. There are also facilities designed for the disabled, including tactile floor blocks, disabled toilets, braille on elevator buttons, and low-height floor buttons and customer service centre counters for wheelchair users.

=== Station layout ===
L2
Platform

Level

→ Platform 1: 11 Shah Alam Line towards SA01 Bandar Utama (Seri Andalas)
Island platform, doors will open on the right
← Platform 2: 11 Shah Alam Line towards SA26 Johan Setia (Bandar Bukit Tinggi)
L1
Concourse
Faregates to paid area, escalators, lifts, ticketing machines, kiosks, customer service counter
G
Ground Level
Feeder Bus Stop, Taxi Lay-By

Station concourse (July 2026)

Platform 1 and 2 (July 2026)

=== Exits and entrances ===
This station has two entrances. Entrance A is situated to the west of Jalan Langat, which leads to the Lotus's hypermarket in Bandar Bukit Tinggi, as well as Bandar Bukit Tinggi 1. Entrance B leads to the east of Jalan Langat, and serves Taman Desawan.

Shah Alam Line station
Entrance	Location	Destination	Picture
A	Western side of Jalan Langat	Feeder bus stop, taxi and private vehicle lay-by Lotus's Bukit Tinggi Pangsapuri Trio (by Setia) Bandar Bukit Tinggi 1	
B	Eastern side of Jalan Langat	Feeder bus stop, taxi and private vehicle lay-by Bandar Sentosa Taman Desawan Taman Klang Jaya Masjid Jamek Cina Muslim Klang	

== Bus Services ==
=== Feeder buses ===
	Origin	Destination	Via	Connecting to	Notes
T719	SA23 Klang Jaya	Taman Kota Pendamar via Pandarmaran Jaya	Lebuh Batu Nilam Persiaran Batu Nilam Jalan Pandarmaran Jaya 5 Jalan Banting-Pandarmaran Jalan Pendarmaran		

=== Other buses ===
	Origin	Destination	Via	Connecting to	Notes
730	Hentian Klang	Banting			It features bus stops at Taman Selatan, Seri Andalas, Klang Jaya, Bandar Bukit Tinggi and Johan Setia LRT stations in the same bus line.

City bus services like the Wawasan Sutera bus route 730 (to Klang and Banting) are also available.

In addition, Rapid On-Demand feeder vans are also available, serving Taman Klang Ria and Bandar Bukit Tinggi 1.

== Gallery ==
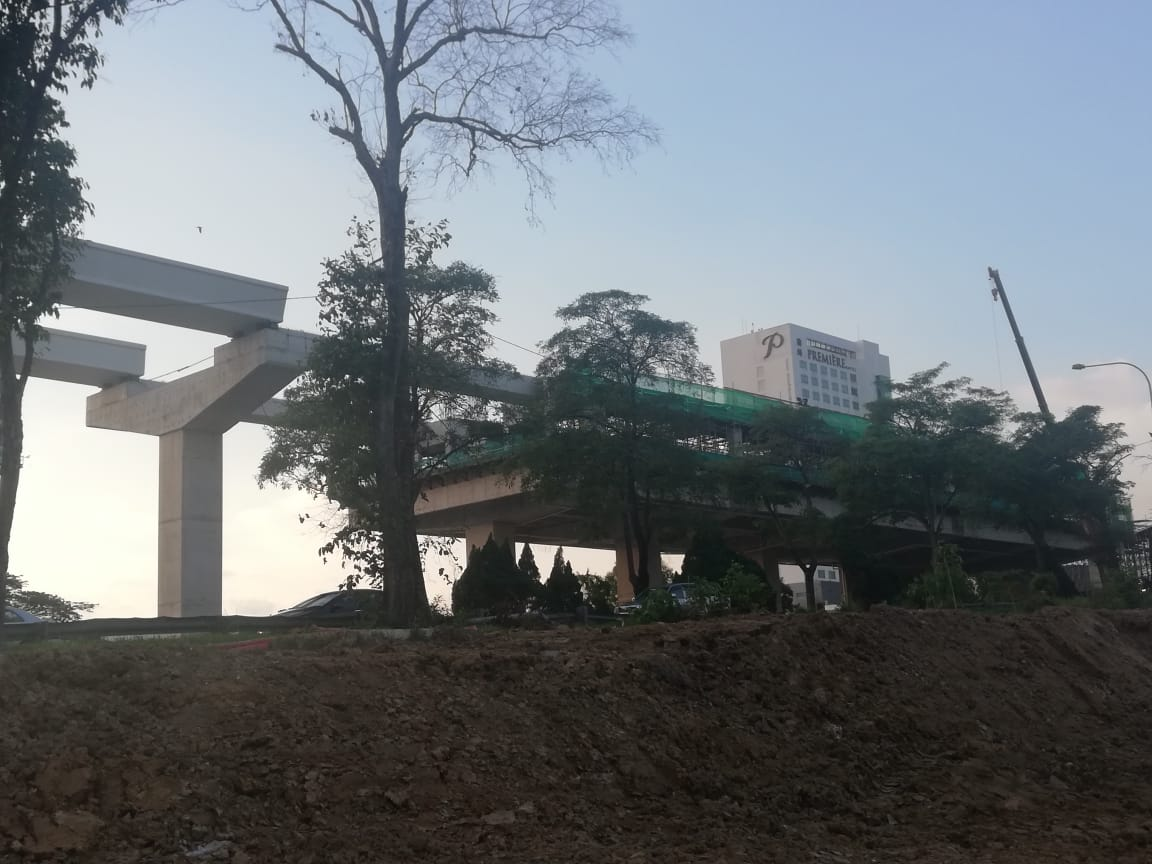
View of the station under construction in 2021

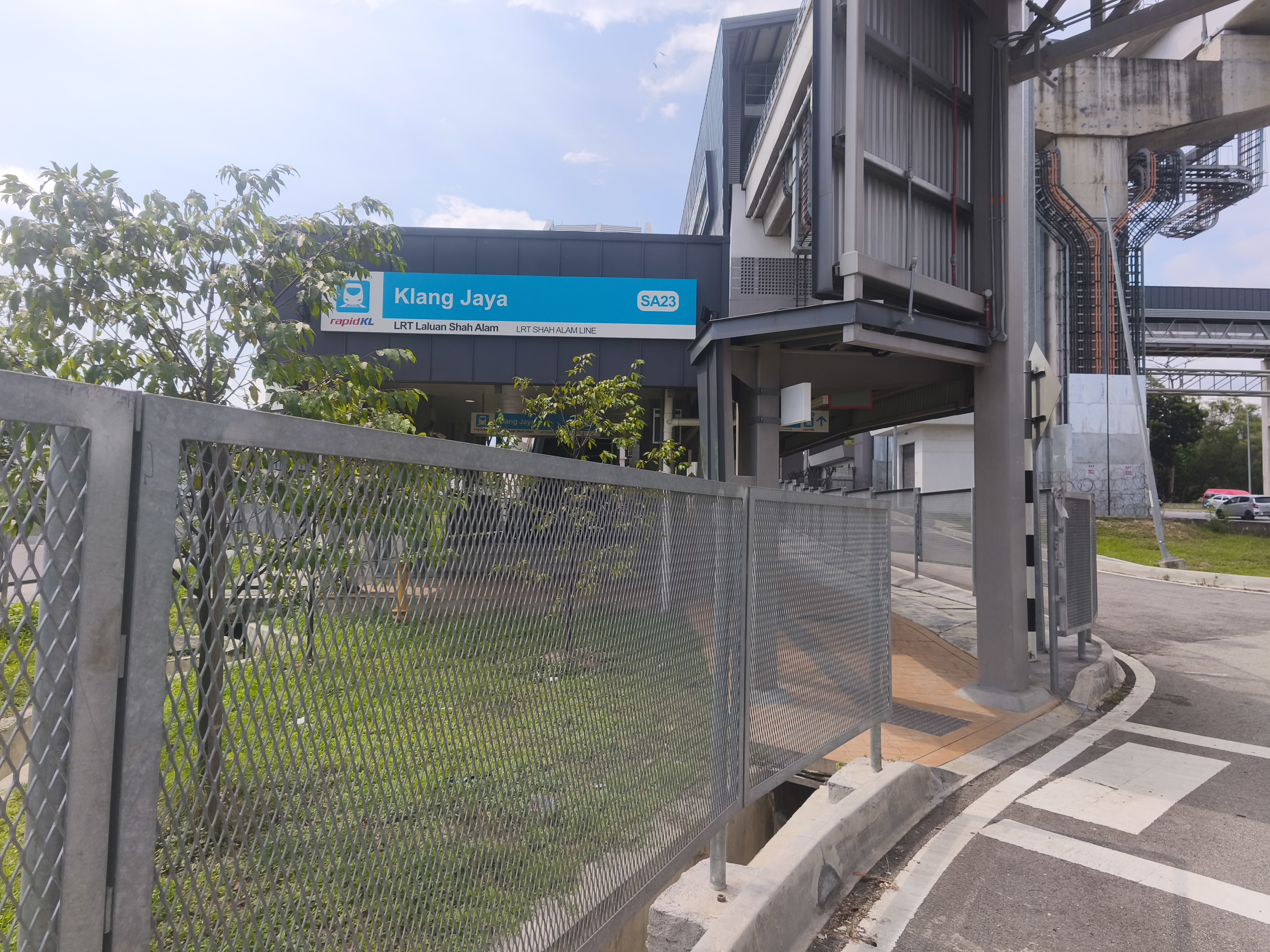
View of the station's Entrance A

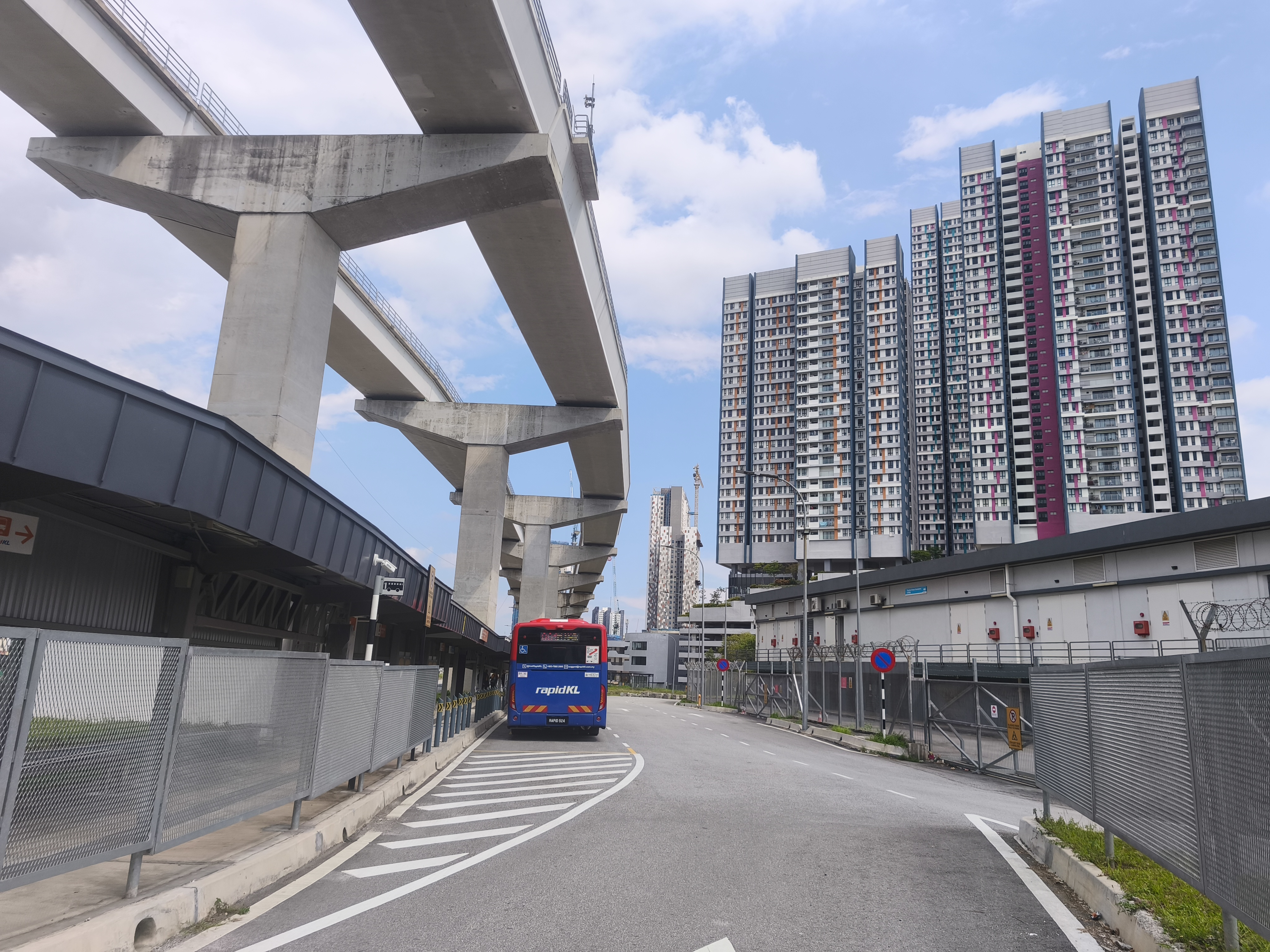
View of the bus lay-by from Entrance A with Trio Setia in the background
