= Bandar Botanik LRT station =

Metro station in Selangor, Malaysia

SA25 Bandar Botanik

General information
- Other names: Malay: Stesen LRT Bandar Botanik; Chinese: 绿林镇站; Tamil: பண்டார் பொத்தேனிக் ரயில் நிலையம்
- Location: Bandar Botanic, Klang, Selangor, Malaysia.
- System: | Future LRT station
- Owner: Syarikat Prasarana Negara
- Operator: RapidKL
- Line: 11 Shah Alam
- Platforms: 2
- Tracks: 2

Construction
- Structure type: Elevated
- Parking: Yes
- Accessible: yes

Other information
- Status: Under construction
- Station code: SA25

History
- Opening: 2031

Services
Preceding station		Following station
Bandar Bukit Tinggi towards Bandar Utama	Shah Alam Line Future service	Johan Setia Terminus
Location

The Bandar Botanik LRT station is designated to be an elevated light rapid transit (LRT) station in Bandar Botanic, Klang, Selangor, Malaysia, forming part of the Shah Alam line.

== History ==
This is the twenty-fifth station along the RM9 billion line project, with the line's maintenance depot located in Johan Setia, Klang.

However, on 13 July 2018, it was earmarked as one of the five stations that were postponed in order to reduce overall construction costs.

On 13 October 2023, during the Budget 2024 presentation, Finance Minister Dato' Seri Anwar Ibrahim announced the reintegration of the five stations that were previously under provisional status including the Bandar Botanik LRT station to be built alongside the rest of the Shah Alam Line. The station will be constructed and targeted for opening in 2031.

== Surrounding developments ==
- Botanic Capital commercial area
- Botanic Avenue commercial area
- Botanic Business Gateway commercial area
- GM Klang Wholesale City
- Klinik Kesihatan Bandar Botanik (Bandar Botanic Health Clinic)
- Makmal Keselamatan dan Kualiti Makanan Selangor (Selangor Food Quality and Safety Laboratory)
