= Bukit Raja Selatan LRT station =

Metro station in Selangor, Malaysia

SA16 Bukit Raja Selatan

General information
- Location: Klang, Selangor; Malaysia
- System: | Future LRT station
- Owner: Prasarana Malaysia; operated by Rapid Rail.
- Line: 11 Shah Alam
- Platforms: 2 side platforms
- Tracks: 2

Construction
- Structure type: Elevated
- Parking: Available

Other information
- Status: Under construction
- Station code: SA16

History
- Opening: 2031

Services
Preceding station		Following station
Seksyen 7 Shah Alam towards Bandar Utama	Shah Alam Line Future service	Bandar Baru Klang towards Johan Setia
Location

The Bukit Raja Selatan LRT station is a light rapid transit (LRT) station serving the Klang suburb in Selangor, Malaysia. It serves as one of the stations on the Shah Alam line. The station is an elevated rapid transit station in Taman Perindustrian Bukit Raja Selatan, Klang, Selangor, Malaysia, forming part of the Klang Valley Integrated Transit System.

== History ==
This is the sixteenth station along the RM9 billion line project, with the line's maintenance depot located in Johan Setia, Klang.

The station was under provisional status due to budgetary cuts made during the change of the Malaysian government in 2018.

However, on 13 October 2023, during the Budget 2024 presentation, Finance Minister Dato' Seri Anwar Ibrahim announced the reintegration of the five stations that were previously under provisional status including the Bukit Raja Selatan LRT station to be built alongside the rest of the Shah Alam Line. The station will be constructed and targeted for opening in 2031.

== Locality landmarks ==
- Bukit Raja Selatan Industrial Park
- Pusat Perniagaan Seksyen 7
- De Art Hotel Shah Alam
