= Bandar Baru Klang LRT station =

Metro station in Selangor, Malaysia

SA17 Bandar Baru Klang
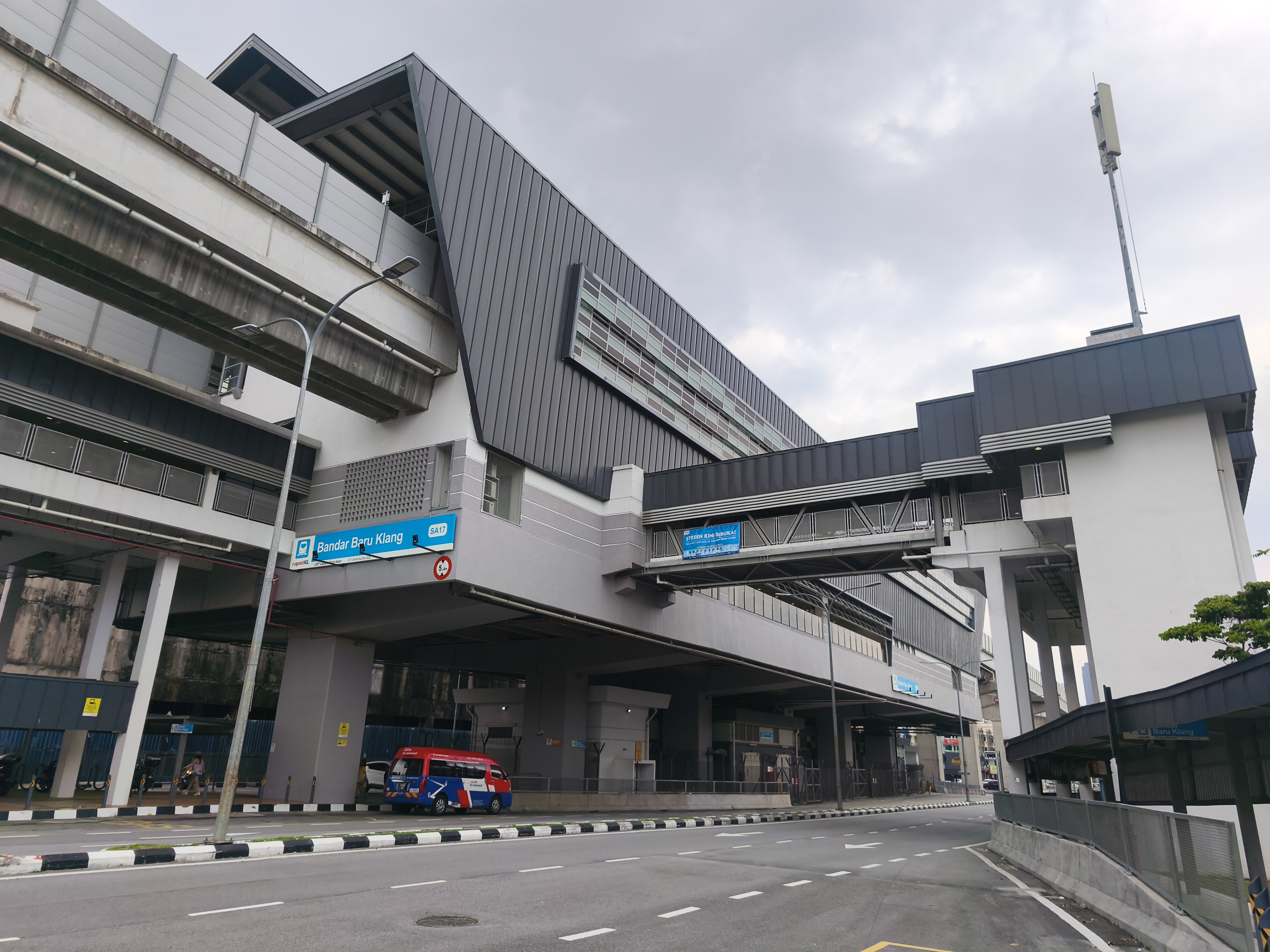

General information
- Other names: Malay: باندر بارو کلڠ (Jawi); Chinese: 巴生新城; Tamil: பண்டார் பாரு கிள்ளான்
- Location: Bandar Baru Klang, Klang, Selangor; Malaysia
- System: Rapid KL
- Owner: Prasarana Malaysia
- Operator: Rapid Rail
- Line: 11 Shah Alam Line
- Platforms: 1 island platform
- Tracks: 2

Construction
- Structure type: Elevated
- Parking: Available
- Accessible: Yes

Other information
- Station code: SA17

History
- Opened: 29 June 2026; 4 months ago

Services
Preceding station		Following station
Seksyen 7 Shah Alam towards Bandar Utama	Shah Alam Line	Pasar Klang towards Johan Setia
Bukit Raja Selatan towards Bandar Utama	Shah Alam Line Future service (2031)	Pasar Klang towards Johan Setia
Location

The Bandar Baru Klang LRT station is a light rapid transit (LRT) station that serves the suburb of Bandar Baru Klang, Klang, Selangor, Malaysia. It serves as one of the stations on the Shah Alam line. The station is an elevated rapid transit station, forming part of the Klang Valley Integrated Transit System.

This is the seventeenth station along the RM9 billion line project, with the line's maintenance depot located in Johan Setia, Klang. It has facilities such as kiosks, restrooms, escalators, elevators, taxi stands, and feeder buses. Operations for the Shah Alam line and this station commenced on 29 June 2026.

== Locality landmarks ==
This station is located along Persiaran Bukit Raja. To the south of the road is a junction to Persiaran Bukit Raja 1 and the BBK Heights condominium, to the north is a commercial area served by Lorong Tiara 3, and to the west is a junction leading to Persiaran Rajawali.

This station serves the neighbourhoods of Bandar Baru Klang, Taman Eng Ann, Taman Berkeley, the Bukit Raja Selatan Industrial Area, Taman Bukit Raya, Kampung Sungai Rasau, Taman Intan, and Taman Ransha. Major landmarks around the station include:

- Bandar Baru Klang business park
- KPJ Klang Specialist Hospital
- Acmar International School
- AEON Bukit Raja Shopping Centre
- Wyndham Acmar Hotel
- Hotel BBK
- Country Hotel
- SMJK Kwang Hua Klang
- BBK Condominium
- Klang Executive Club
- Wisma Persekutuan Daerah Klang
- Taman Berkeley
- Palm Garden Apartment
- Pangsapuri Mawar
- Pangsapuri Dahlia

== Station Features ==
The station adopts the standard elevated station design for the Shah Alam Line, with one island platform above the concourse level and two entrances/exits. The station is located on top of Persiaran Bukit Raja which is one of the main roads serving the Bandar Baru Klang township. The station also has facilities for the disabled, including tactile floor blocks, disabled toilets, braille on elevator buttons, and low-height elevator buttons and customer service centre counters for wheelchair users.

=== Station layout ===
L2	Platform; Level	→ Platform 1: 11 Shah Alam Line towards SA01 Bandar Utama (Seksyen 7 Shah Alam)
L2	Platform; Level	Island platform, doors will open on the right
L2	Platform; Level	← Platform 2: 11 Shah Alam Line towards SA26 Johan Setia (Pasar Klang)
L1	Concourse	Faregates to paid area, escalators, lifts, ticketing machines, kiosks, customer service counter
G	Ground Level	Feeder Bus Stop, Taxi Lay-By

=== Exits and entrances ===
The station has two entrances. Entrance A is situated on the northern side of the Persiaran Bukit Raja, next to an abandoned building and directly connects commuters towards the Bandar Baru Klang business park commercial area. Entrance B is situated on the southern side of the Persiaran Bukit Raja directly next to the BBK Heights residences entrance and also connects commuters to KPJ Klang Specialist Hospital.

Shah Alam Line station
Entrance	Location	Destination	Picture
A	Northern side of Persiaran Bukit Raja	Feeder bus stop, taxi and private vehicle lay-by Bandar Baru Klang business park	
B	Southern side of Persiaran Bukit Raja	Feeder bus stop, taxi and private vehicle lay-by BBK Heights Residences; KPJ Klang Specialist Hospital	

== Bus Services ==
Current bus services such as Smart Selangor bus route KLG2B (to Klang city centre).

In addition, Rapid On-Demand feeder vans are also available, serving the nearby Taman Berkeley neighbourhood.

== Gallery ==
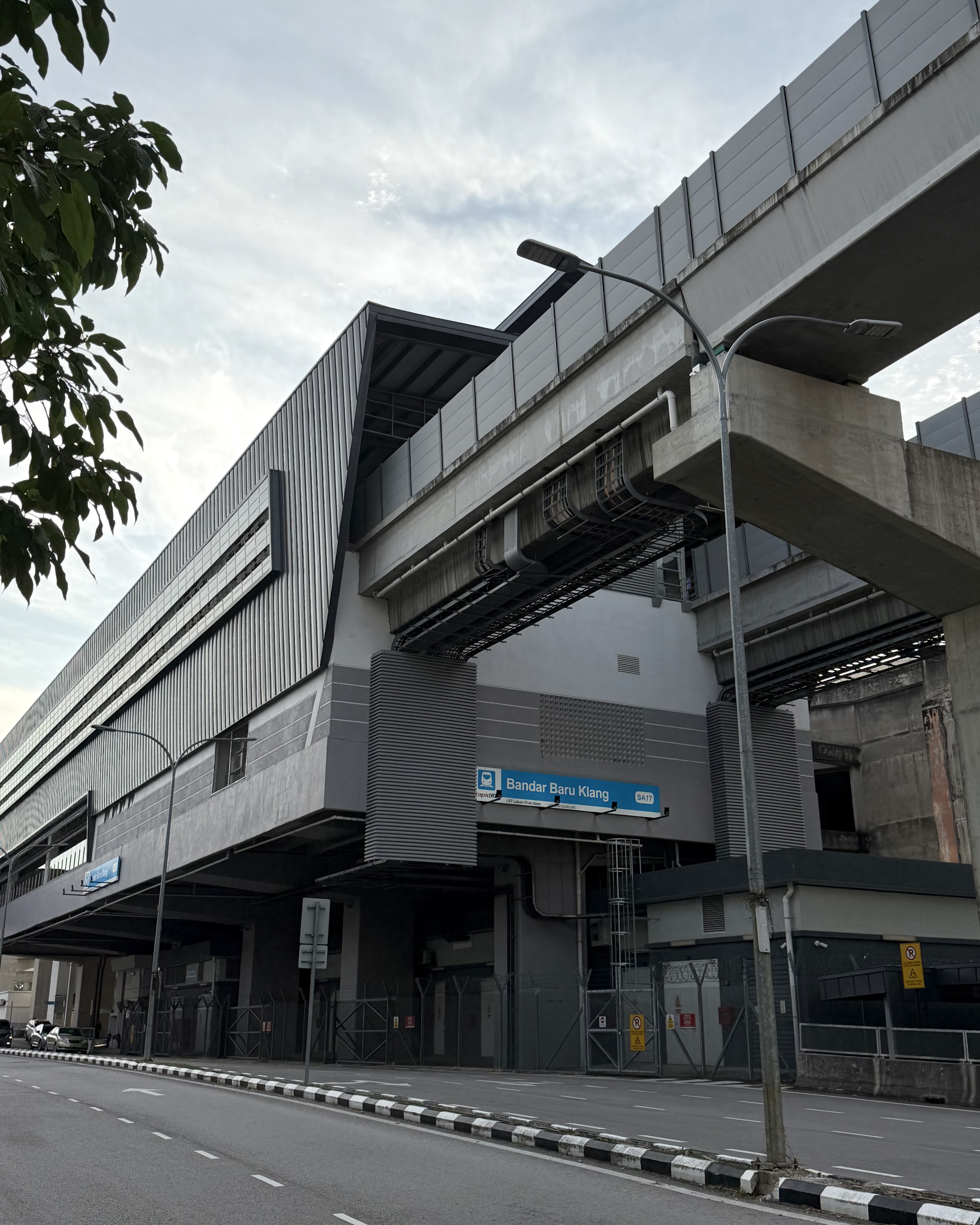
View of the station from the neighboring BBK Heights sidewalk nearby Entrance B of the station

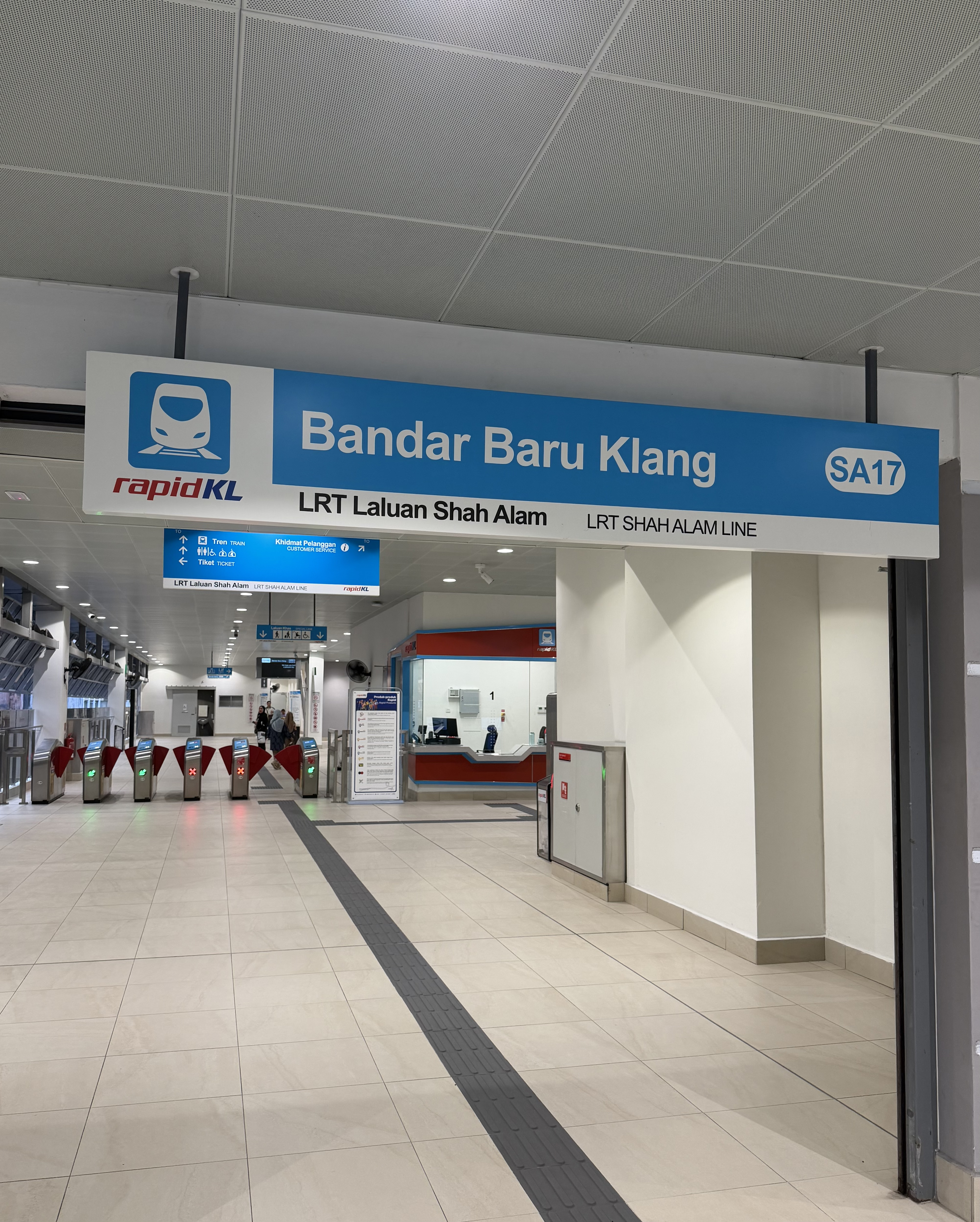
View of the concourse and customer service counter (partial) from Entrance A, just after the escalators

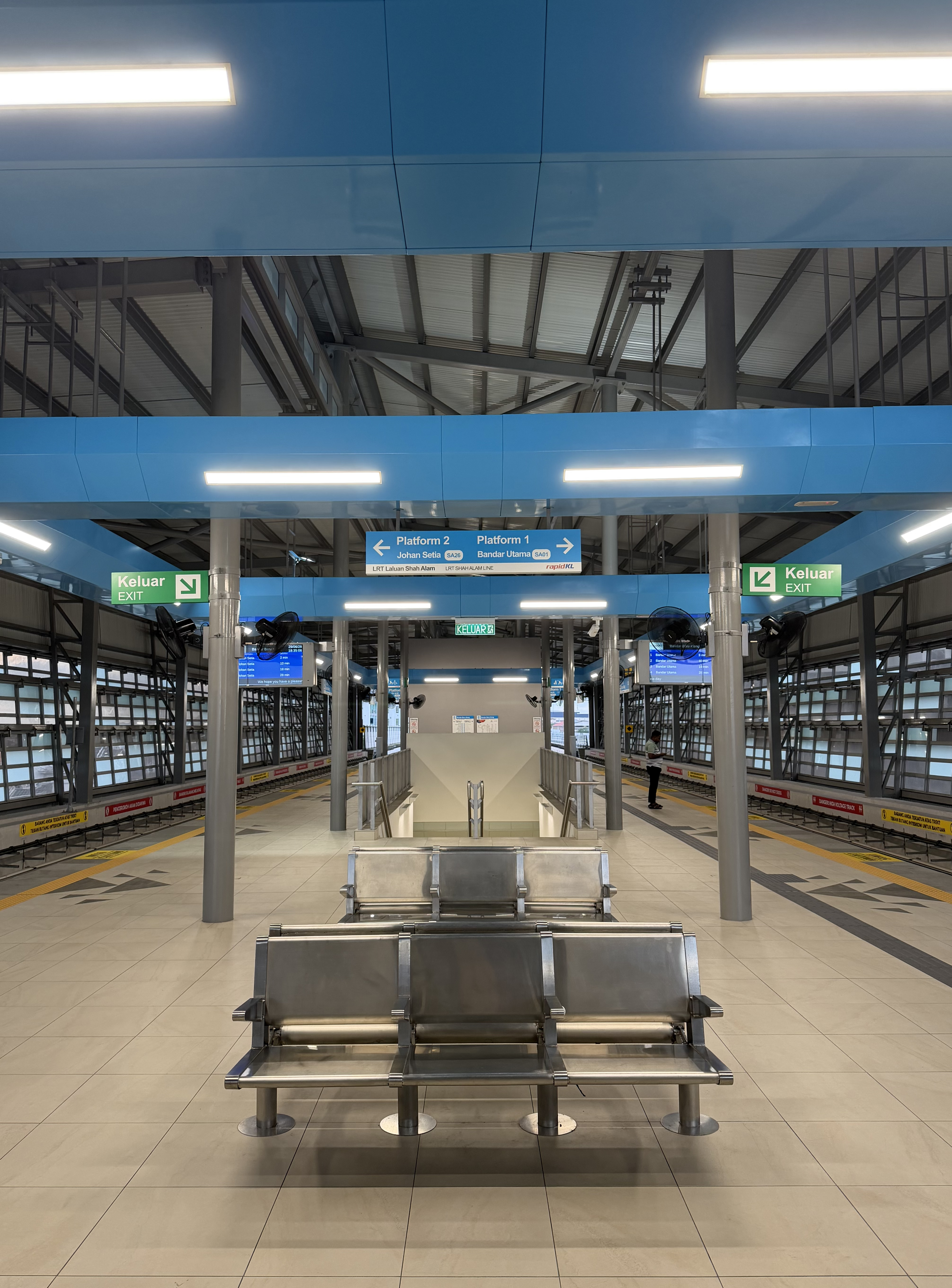
View of the station's platform
