= ÆON Bukit Tinggi Shopping Centre =

Shopping mall in Klang, Selangor, Malaysia

ÆON Bandar Bukit Tinggi Shopping Centre
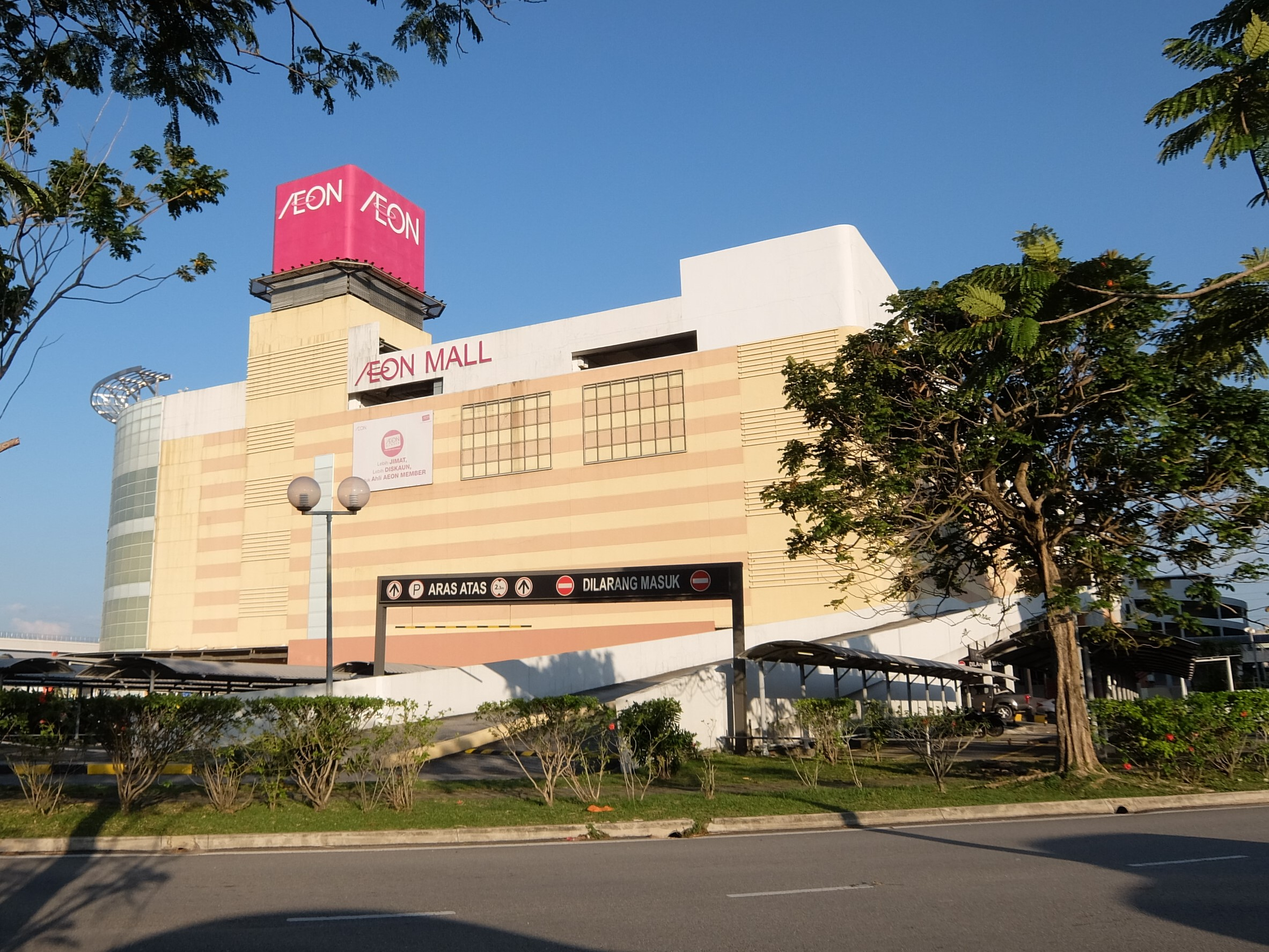
- Location: Bukit Tinggi, Klang, Selangor, Malaysia
- Coordinates: 2°59′39.5″N 101°26′40″E
- Address: No. 1, Persiaran Batu Nilam 1/KS 6
- Opened: 24 November 2007
- Developer: WCT Berhad
- Num. of stores: 500+
- Floor area: 1,800,000 square feet (170,000 m^{2})
- Floors: 6
- Parking: 3000+
- Public transit: SA24 Bandar Bukit Tinggi
- Website: ÆON Bukit Tinggi

Full aerial view of AEON Bukit Tinggi Shopping Centre.

ÆON Bukit Tinggi Shopping Centre is a shopping mall also known as Jusco Bukit Tinggi, located in the Bandar Bukit Tinggi township, Klang, Selangor, Malaysia. It is the largest ÆON (JUSCO) shopping centre in Malaysia and the third largest in Southeast Asia.

The RM350 million (over US$111 million) mall was opened on 24 November 2007 by the Sultan of Selangor, Sultan Sharafuddin Idris Shah.

The mall has a gross lettable/leasable area of 1,800,000 square feet (170,000 m^{2}), making it one of the largest shopping malls in Malaysia. The AEON store is the anchor tenant. Other stores include restaurants, cafes, specialty and service stores, food courts, leisure and entertainment stores, cinemas, sport stores, and book store.

The mall is directly connected to the Bandar Bukit Tinggi LRT station on the LRT Shah Alam line. It is the first AEON to have a joint hotel and apartment, The Landmark. AEON Bukit Tinggi has around 25,000 customers on weekdays and more than 40,000 at weekends. It has more than 3,000 carparks.

== See also ==
- List of shopping malls in Malaysia
