= Bandar Utama station =

MRT station in Petaling Jaya, Selangor, Malaysia

KG09 SA01 Bandar Utama
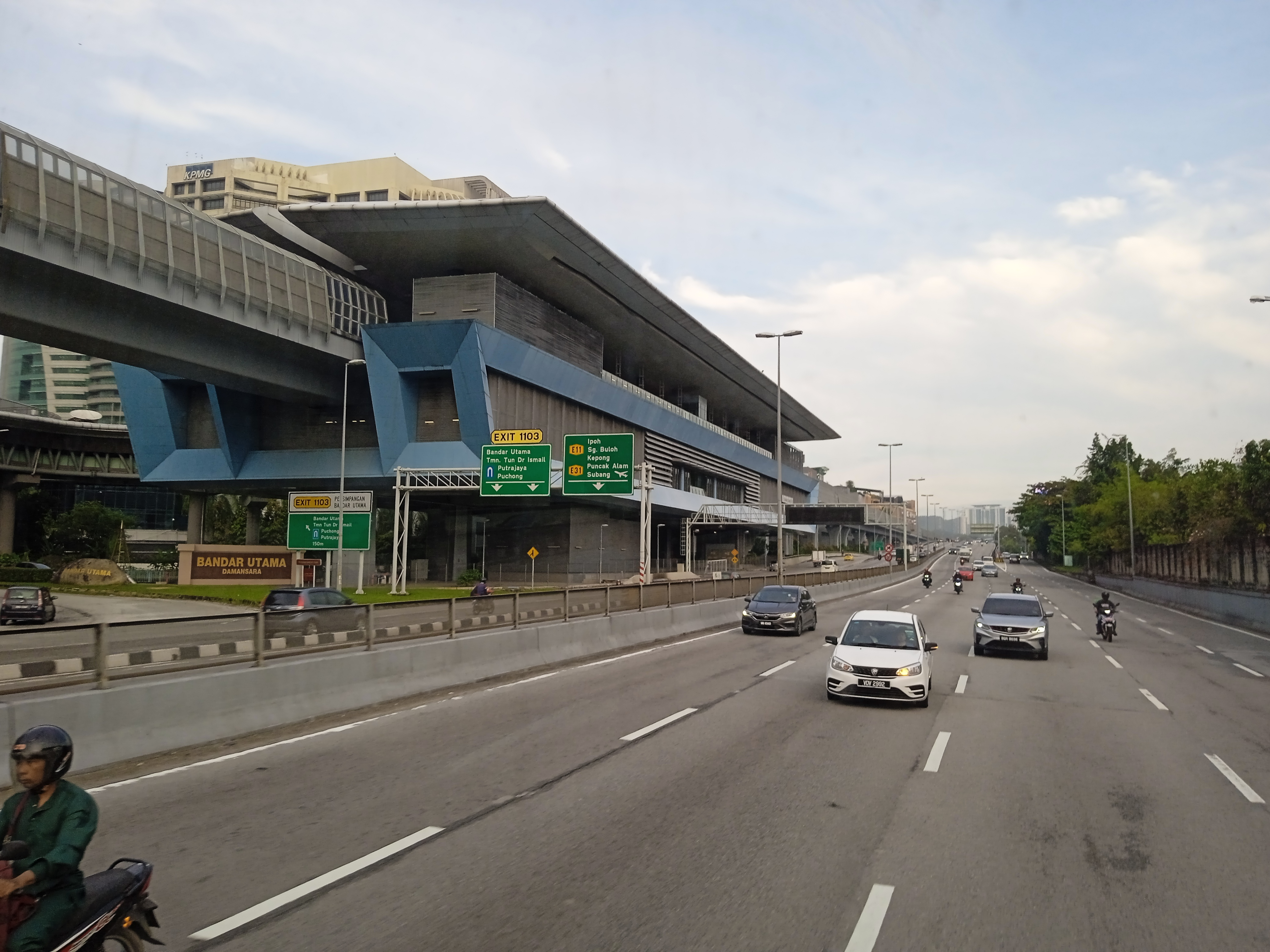
- Overall view of Bandar Utama MRT station from LDP

General information
- Other names: Malay: باندر اوتام (Jawi); Chinese: 万达镇; Tamil: பண்டார் உத்தாமா
- Location: Persiaran Bandar Utama, Bandar Utama, PJU 6, 47800 Petaling Jaya; Selangor; Malaysia
- Coordinates: 3°8′47.92″N 101°37′7.49″E
- System: Rapid KL
- Owner: MRT Corp (MRT); Prasarana Malaysia (LRT)
- Operator: Rapid Rail
- Lines: 9 Kajang Line; 11 Shah Alam Line
- Platforms: 2 side platforms (MRT); 1 island platform (LRT)
- Tracks: 2 (MRT); 2 (LRT)

Construction
- Structure type: Elevated
- Parking: Available with payment. 500 total parking bays. 245 motorcycle bays
- Cycle facilities: Not available
- Accessible: Yes

Other information
- Station code: KG09 SA01

History
- Opened: 16 December 2016; 9 years ago (MRT); 29 June 2026; 60 days ago (LRT)
- Former names: One Utama

Services
Preceding station		Following station
Mutiara Damansara towards Kwasa Damansara	Kajang Line	Taman Tun Dr Ismail towards Kajang
Terminus	Shah Alam Line	Kayu Ara towards Johan Setia
Location

The Bandar Utama station is a rapid transit interchange station serving the suburb of Bandar Utama in Petaling Jaya, Selangor, Malaysia as well as parts of Taman Tun Dr Ismail (TTDI), Kuala Lumpur which lie across the Damansara–Puchong Expressway (LDP) from the station.

It is one of the stations of the MRT Kajang Line and LRT Shah Alam Line. The MRT section was opened on 16 December 2016 while the LRT section opened on 29 June 2026.

This station is located next to the 1 Utama Shopping Centre, one of the biggest shopping malls in the Klang Valley. Other well-known landmarks near the station are the One World Hotel, Plaza IBM and KPMG Tower, which are linked to the station via a pedestrian link-bridge.

== Station features ==
=== Kajang Line ===
==== Overview ====
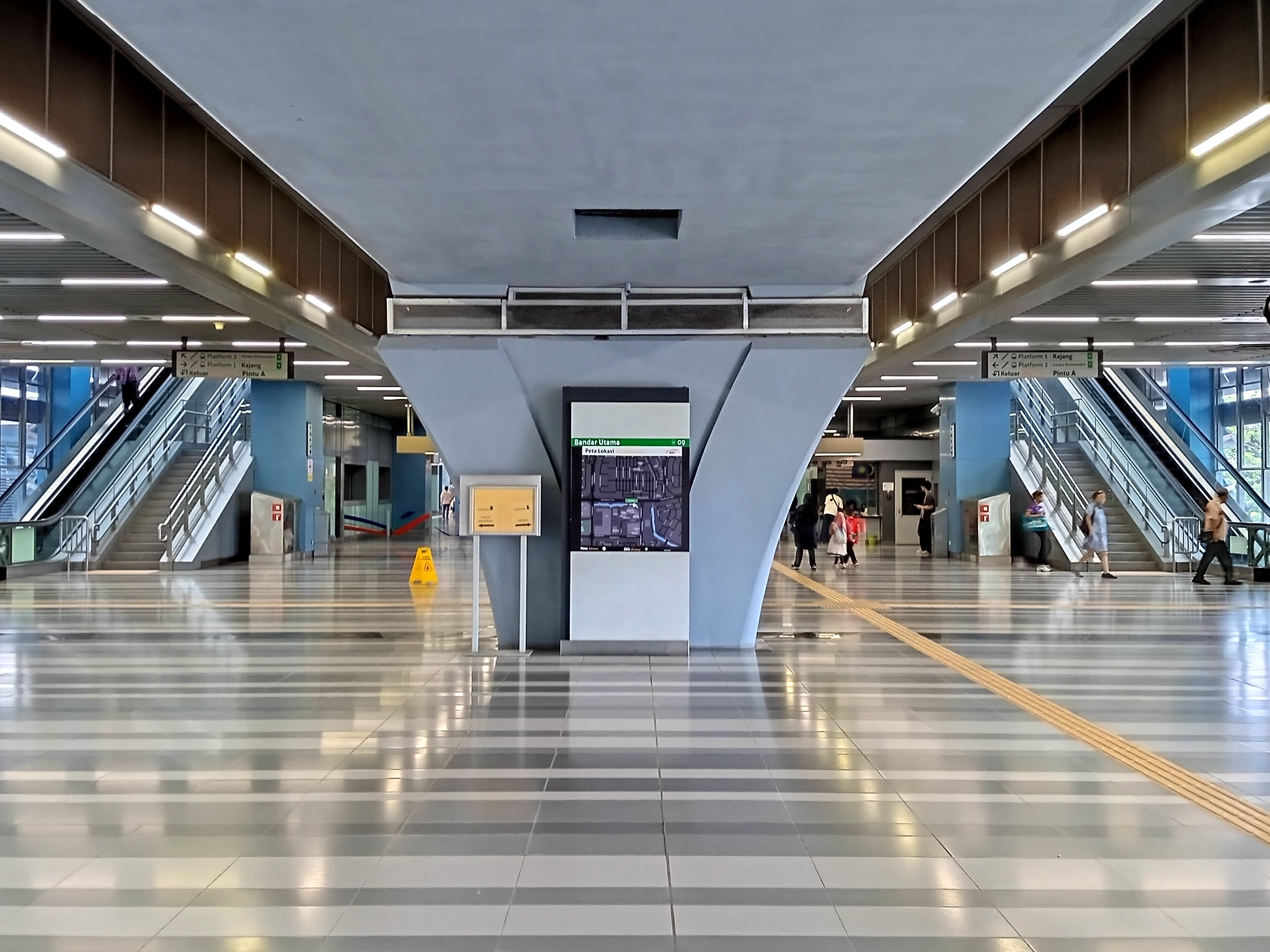
Concourse level of the station.

The MRT portion of the station is located beside the Damansara-Puchong Expressway (LDP) directly behind the Sri Pentas Building in Bandar Utama. The station's support columns are located between the expressway and the water channel, which runs parallel to the expressway.

The station adopts the standard elevated station design for the Kajang Line, a "wakaf" conceptual design with two side platforms above the concourse level.

However, unlike the other elevated stations, there are no escalators, lifts or staircases linking the station directly to ground level, nor are there any lay-bys for buses, taxis and cars at ground level directly below the station. Access to the station is via link bridges from the 1Powerhouse Building, where the feeder bus stop and park and ride facilities are located, and from the One World Hotel and 1 Utama complex.

==== Station layout ====
L2	Platform Level	Side platform
L2	Platform Level	Platform 1: 9 Kajang Line towards KG35 Kajang (→)
L2	Platform Level	Platform 2: 9 Kajang Line towards KG04 Kwasa Damansara (←)
L2	Platform Level	Side platform
L1	Concourse	Faregates to paid area, escalators to platforms, ticketing machines, customer service office, station control, shops, Entrance A to pedestrian link bridge to 1Powerhouse building and Shah Alam Line, Entrance B to link bridge to 1 Utama Shopping Centre, emergency staircase to ground level from back-of-house.
G	Ground Level	Emergency services parking bays.

=== Shah Alam Line ===
==== Overview ====
The LRT portion of the station is located perpendicular to the Damansara-Puchong Expressway (LDP), and parallel to Sungai Kayu Ara directly beside the 1Powerhouse building in Bandar Utama.

The station adopts the standard station design for the Shah Alam Line; inspired by the "tanjak" conceptual design with an island platform that has a slightly trapezium layout above the concourse level.

Similar to the Kajang Line portion of the station, there are no escalators, lifts or staircases linking the station directly to ground level, nor are there any lay-bys for buses, taxis and cars at ground level directly below the station. Access to the station is via link bridges from the 1Powerhouse Building, where the feeder bus stop and park and ride facilities are located, and from the One World Hotel and 1 Utama complex.

==== Station layout ====
L2	Platform Level	Platform 1: Unused
L2	Platform Level	Island platform, doors will open on the right
L2	Platform Level	Platform 2: 11 Shah Alam Line towards SA26 Johan Setia (←)
L1	Concourse	Faregates to paid area, escalators to platforms, ticketing machines, customer service office, station control, shops, Entrance A to pedestrian link bridge to 1Powerhouse building, Kajang Line, and 1 Utama Shopping Centre, emergency staircase to ground level from back-of-house.
G	Ground Level	Emergency services parking bays.

=== Exits and entrances ===
Access to both stations are via two pedestrian link bridges: one connecting Entrance A to the neighbouring 1Powerhouse Building which also serves as the interconnecting walkway between the MRT and LRT stations, and another connecting Entrance B to 1 Utama. The second link bridge was opened on 1 February 2018.

All these buildings are owned by Bandar Utama City Corporation Sdn Bhd, making this station the only one on the Kajang Line where access to the station is via properties owned by other entities. There is no access to the station from the ground level directly beneath the station along the Damansara–Puchong Expressway (LDP). The lay-by and stairs at this location are for emergency purposes only.

The 1Powerhouse Building houses the feeder bus stop at the ground level, as well as the park-and-ride facility for the station, which takes up two basement levels. Taxi and private vehicle drop-off areas are also located on the ground floor of the building.

Entrance	Location	Destination	Picture
A	Pedestrian link bridge to 1Powerhouse Building	Feeder bus stop, park and ride, 1Powerhouse, Persiaran Bandar Utama	
B	Pedestrian link bridge to 1 Utama Shopping Centre (1 Utama E)	1 Utama Shopping Centre, One World Hotel, IBM Tower, KPMG Tower, 1 First Avenue, Sri Pentas	

== History ==
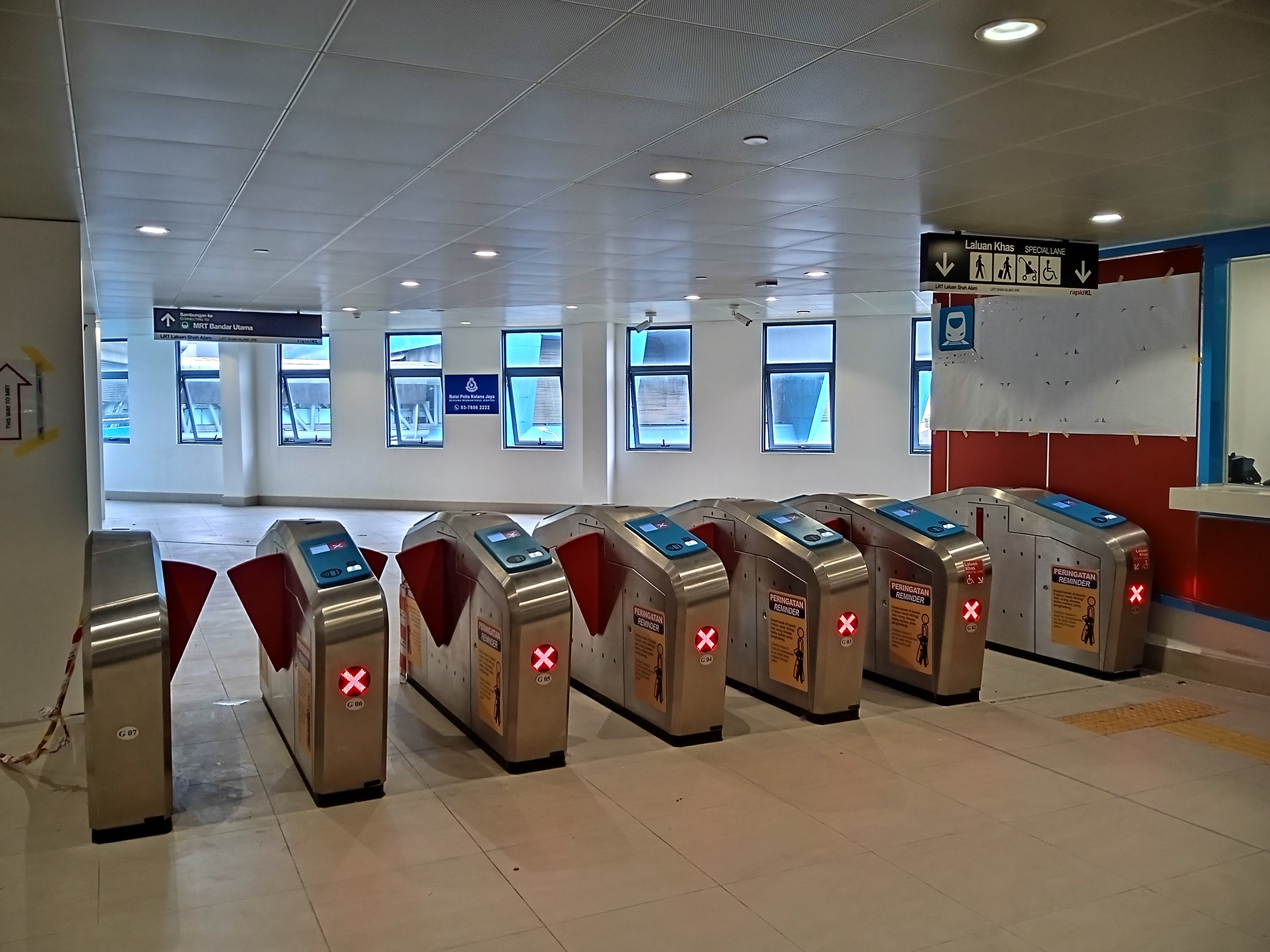
Corridor of Shah Alam Line for Bandar Utama LRT station

During the planning stage, the station was referred to as One Utama, as it was situated next to the 1 Utama Shopping Centre. However, it was officially renamed Bandar Utama prior to its opening in 2016 after the suburb it is situated in, rather than the name of the shopping complex.

A pedestrian bridge linking the station to the Burhanuddin Helmi section of Taman Tun Dr Ismail (TTDI) residential area, which is geographically located directly across the LDP from the station was also proposed as part of the construction plans. This would have enabled residents of the northern part of the residential area to have access to the station, while the southern part would be served by Taman Tun Dr Ismail station which lies 200 metres from the TTDI Wet Market. However, the TTDI Residents Association (RA) objected to the link, citing parking by MRT commuters along Burhanuddin Helmi's roads and illegal stalls as a result of the link. The RA collected signatures of objections from residents, despite MRT Corp's pleas to proceed with the pedestrian bridge for the benefit of the residents.

In the end, in July 2014, MRT acceded to the objection. Once operational however, there were voices of dissent on the lack of connectivity for the residents of TTDI's northern tip.

From its opening on 16 December 2016 till 31 January 2018, the only access to the station was from the 1Powerhouse Building via the pedestrian overhead bridge at Entrance A. A temporary linkway to One World Hotel and subsequently 1 Utama from the station's Entrance B was opened on 1 February 2018, allowing a more direct connection to the shopping centre. On 11 July 2020, with the completion of 1 Utama E (an annexe block and extension of the shopping centre), the temporary linkway was replaced with direct access to 1 Utama E.

== Bus services ==
=== Feeder buses ===
With the opening of the Kajang Line, feeder buses also began operating linking the residential areas of Taman Tun Dr Ismail, Bandar Utama and Kampung Sungai Penchala with this station. The feeder buses operate from the station's feeder bus stop at the adjacent 1Powerhouse building, accessed via Entrance A of the station. These buses do not stop at the Bandar Utama bus hub.

Route No.	Origin	Destination	Via	Connecting to
T811	KG09 SA01 Bandar Utama (Entrance A)	Kampung Sungai Kayu Ara; Bandar Utama BU 11-12; Mutiara Tropicana	Persiaran Bandar Utama; Lebuh Bandar Utama; Persiaran Tropicana; Jalan Tropicana Selatan; Jalan Masjid, Kampung Sungai Kayu Ara	Terminus
T812	KG09 SA01 Bandar Utama (Entrance A)	Taman Tun Dr Ismail; Kampung Sungai Penchala	Persiaran Bandar Utama; Dataran Bandar Utama; Lebuh Bandar Utama; Jalan Burhanuddin Helmi; Jalan Datuk Sulaiman; Jalan Sungai Penchala; Damansara–Puchong Expressway	Terminus

=== Other buses ===
Route No.	Origin	Destination	Via	Connecting to
506	Bandar Utama bus hub	KT3 PY36 Putrajaya Sentral	KG09 SA01 Bandar Utama (Entrance A) (Bandar Utama-bound only); Damansara–Puchong Expressway; Damansara Utama; KJ24 Kelana Jaya; SP24 IOI Puchong Jaya / IOI Mall Puchong; SP25 Pusat Bandar Puchong; Puchong Utama; FT 29 Putrajaya–Cyberjaya Expressway	451, P108, T508, T508B, T509, T510, T511, T512, T512B, T513, T513B, T514B, T523, T591B
802	KJ24 Kelana Jaya	Section 11, Kota Damansara	Damansara–Puchong Expressway; Persiaran Bandar Utama; KG09 SA01 Bandar Utama (Entrance A); Lebuh Bandar Utama; Persiaran Surian; KG08 Mutiara Damansara; KG07 Surian; Persiaran Mahogani	T808

== Park and Ride ==
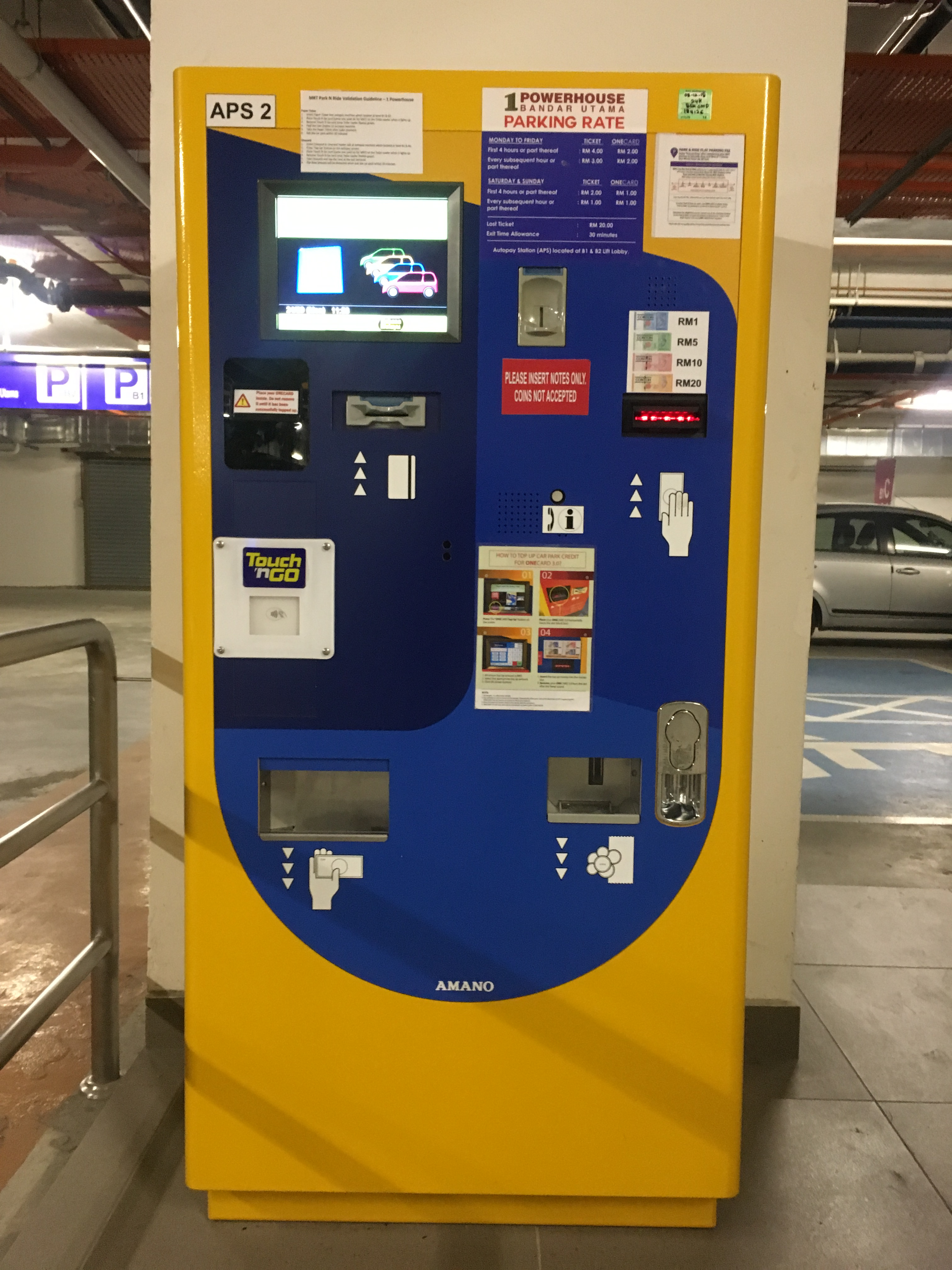
Parking payment machine which has a Touch 'n Go scanner to verify MRT users.

The station has an adjoining park and ride facility which is located at levels B1 and B2 of the 1Powerhouse Building. Access to the park and ride facility is via Entrance A and the pedestrian link bridge that connects the station with 1Powerhouse. The facility has around 500 bays.

The park and ride facility is provided by the owners of the 1Powerhouse Building, Bandar Utama City Centre Sdn Bhd, and not the owner or operator of the MRT Kajang Line. As a result, the parking charges are determined by the owner.

MRT users (except for those who board trains at six stations nearest to Bandar Utama MRT station) are charged a flat rate of RM4.30 per entry per day. As the parking facility does not use the Touch 'n Go electronic purse system for payment, MRT users must verify their status with their Touch 'n Go cards used on the MRT at the parking payment machines at the park and ride facility in order to enjoy the flat rate.

MRT users who board trains at the Kota Damansara, Surian, Mutiara Damansara, Taman Tun Dr Ismail, Phileo Damansara and Pusat Bandar Damansara stations do not qualify for the flat rate charges (because the flat fee is only applicable to MRT riders who have travelled more than 3 stations away from Bandar Utama).

The park and ride facility is separate from the upper floor parking, which is meant for 1Powerhouse occupants, including guests of the Avante Hotel, which is part of the building. Park and ride flat rate charges are not available at the upper floor parking, where hourly parking charges apply.

== Gallery ==
=== Station ===
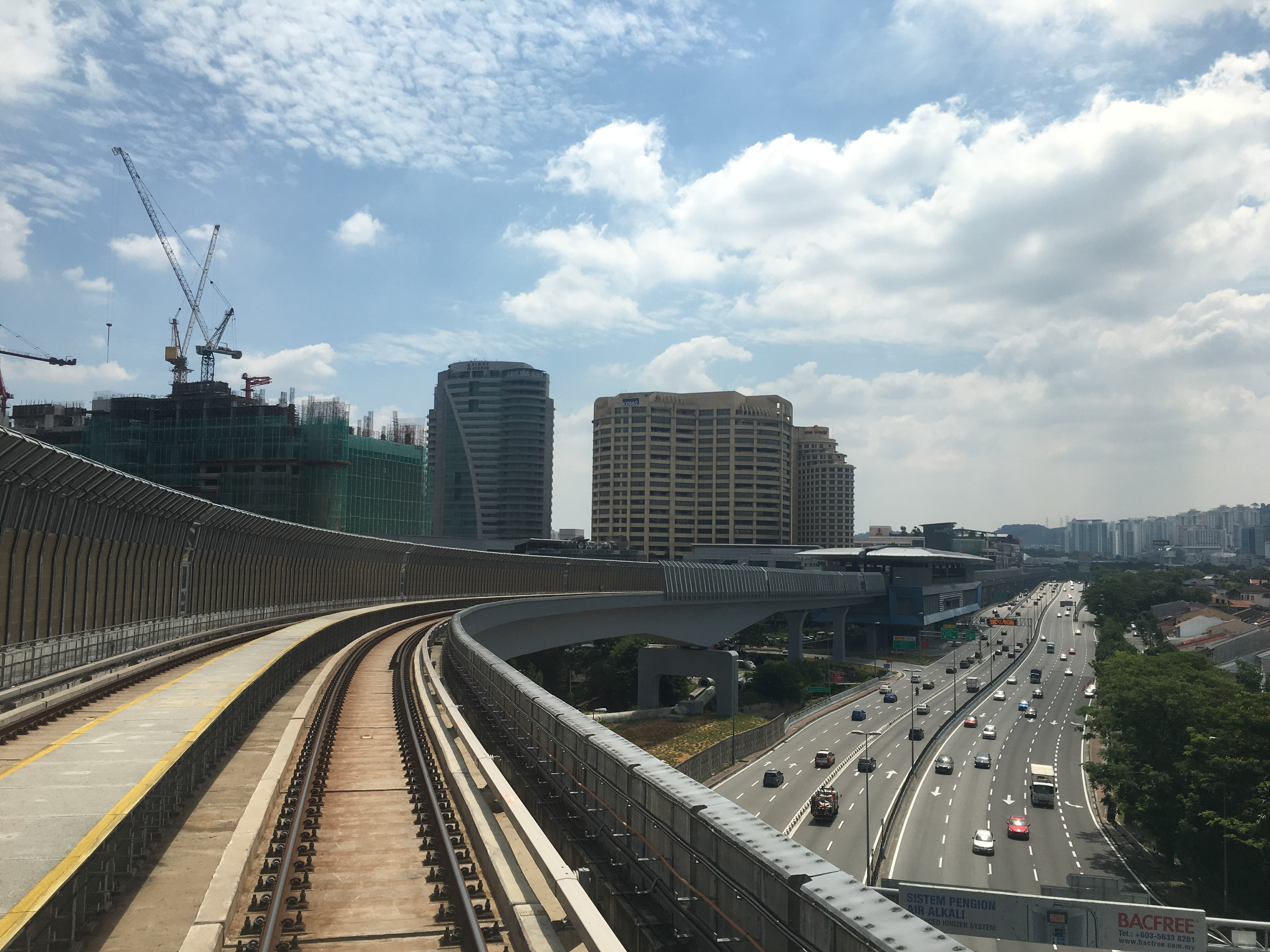
View of the station from a train running on tracks over the Damansara-Puchong Expressway

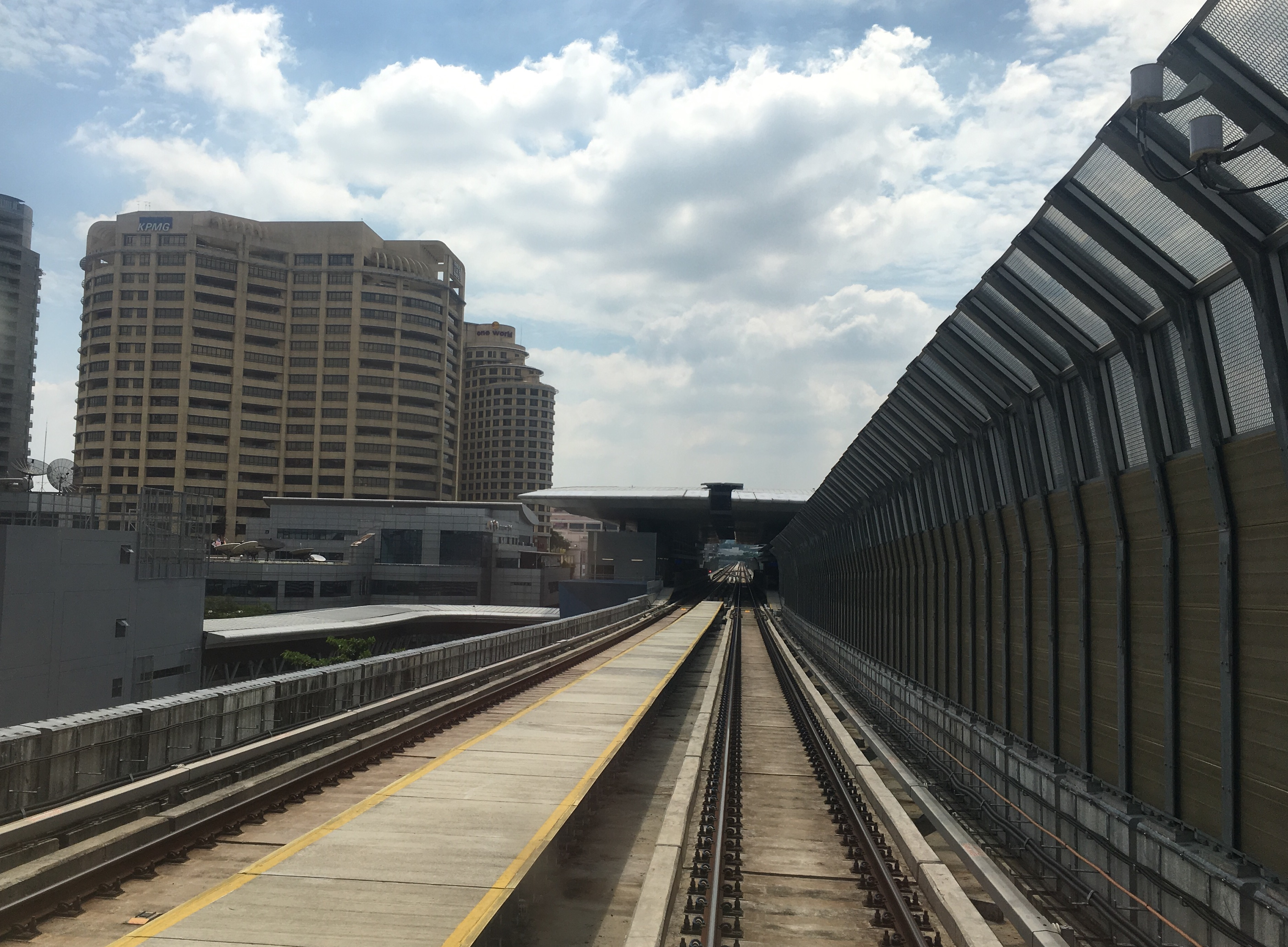
View of the station and the One World Hotel next to it

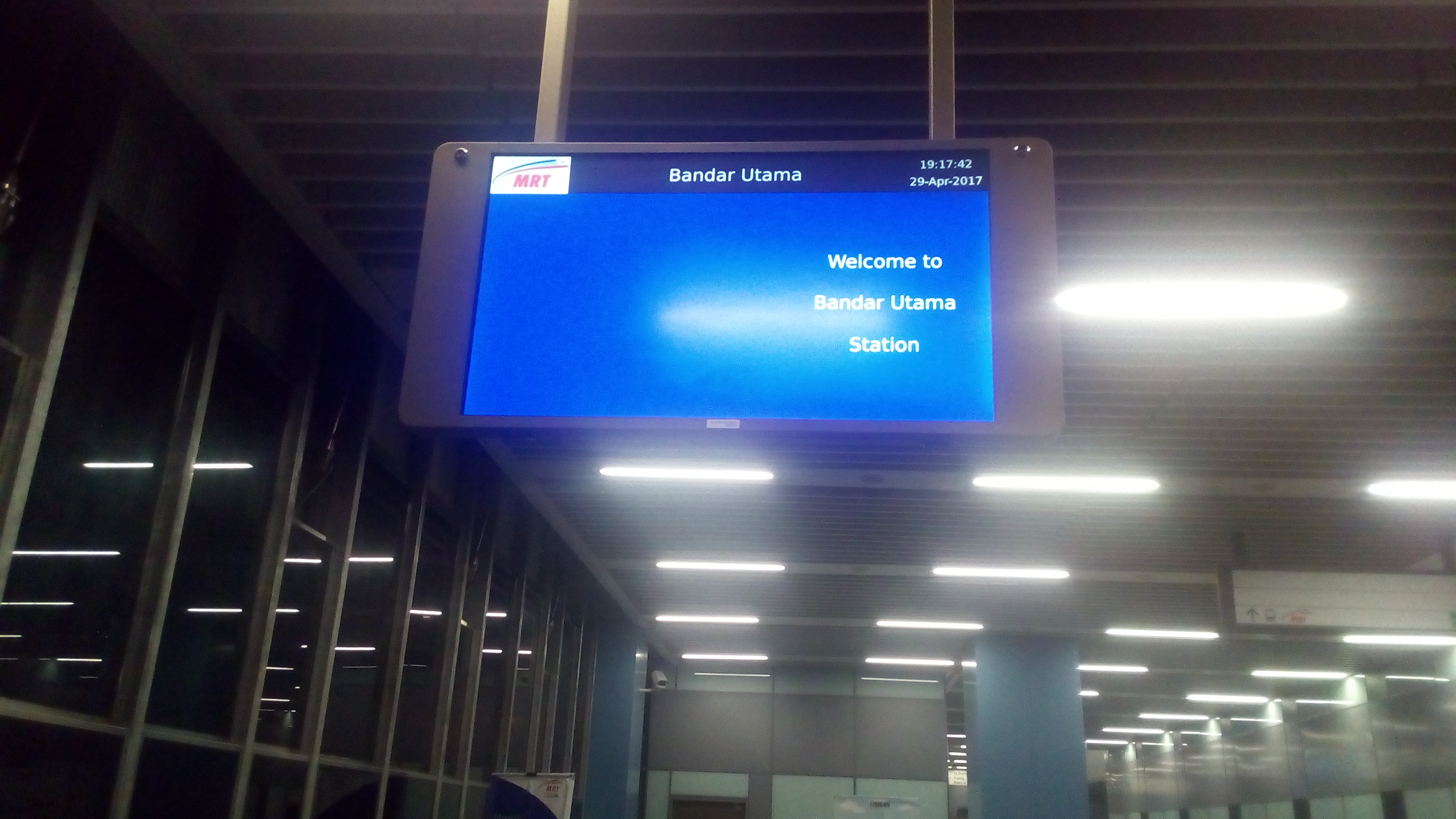
An electronic board at the entrance of the station

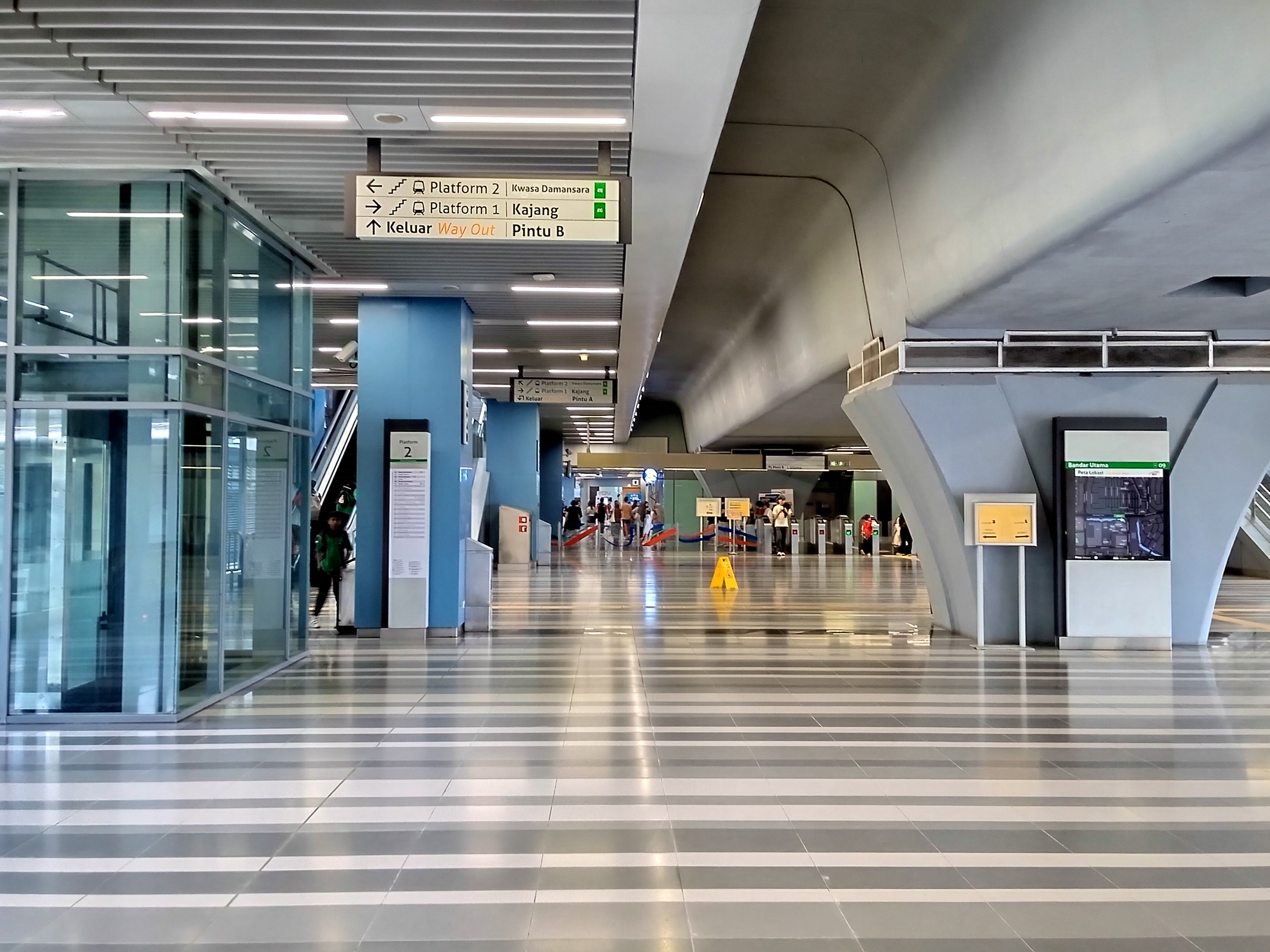
View of the station's faregates at Entrance B from the concourse

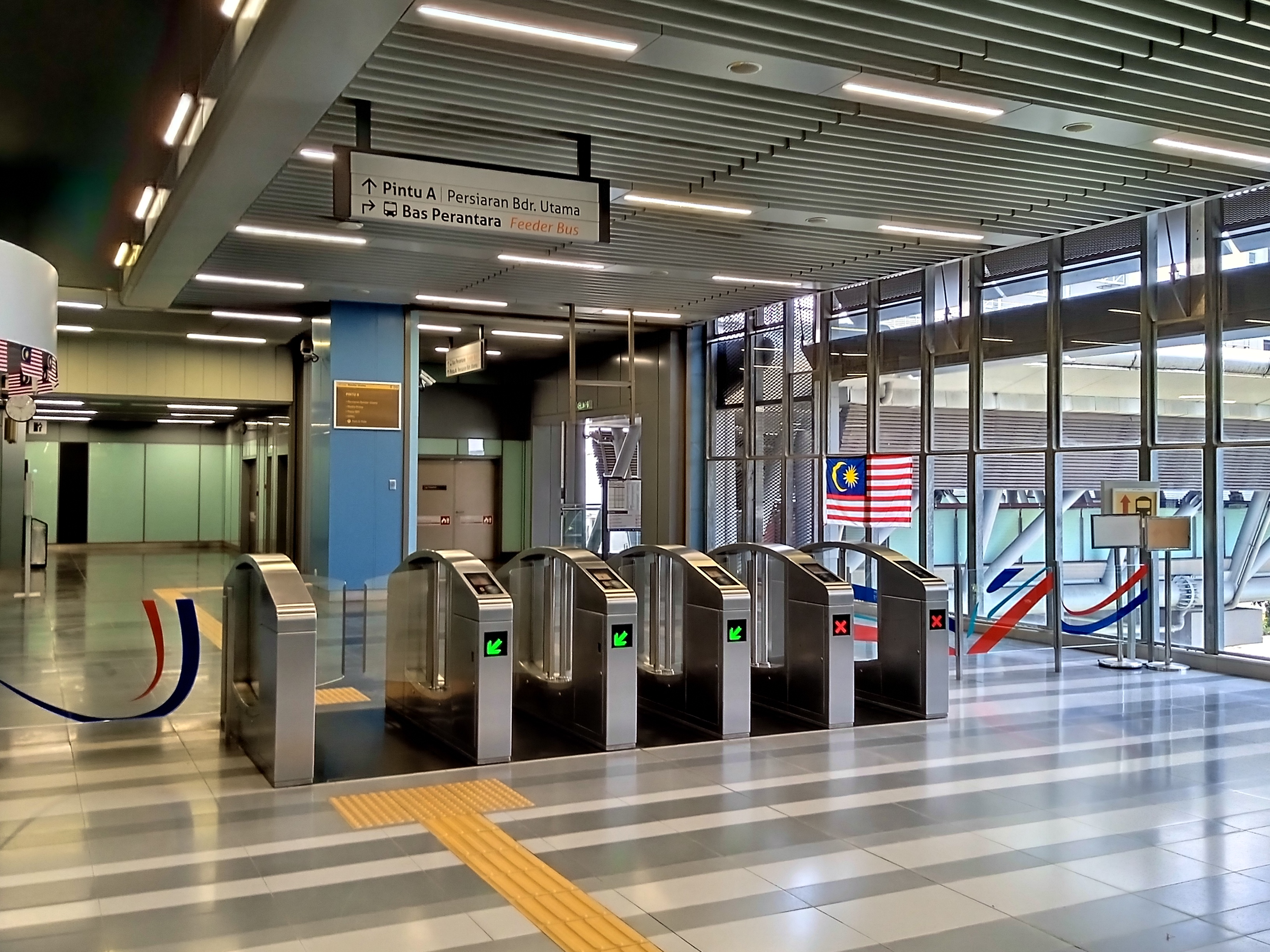
Faregates leading to Entrance A of the station

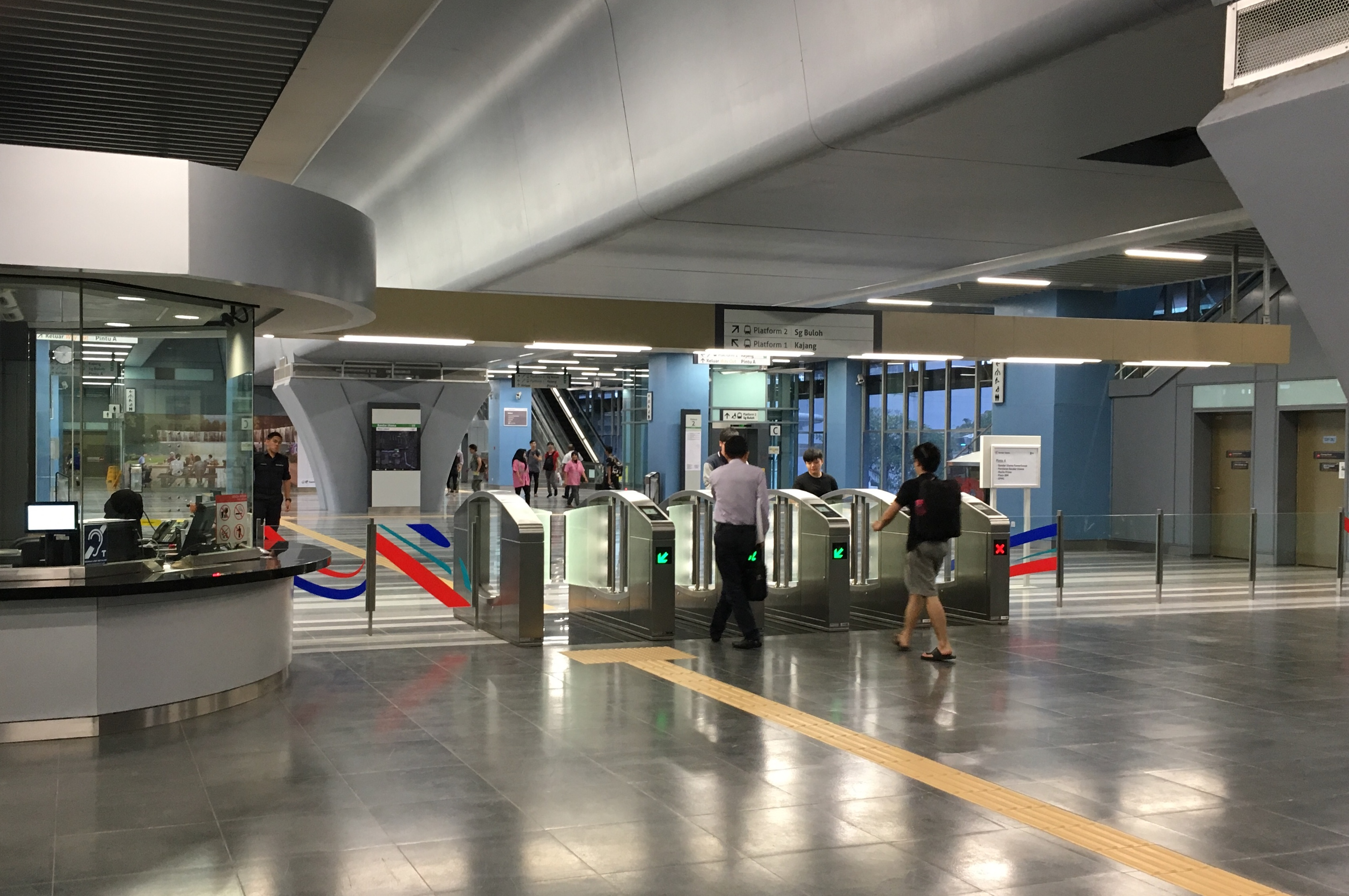
Commuters entering the faregates from Entrance B of the station

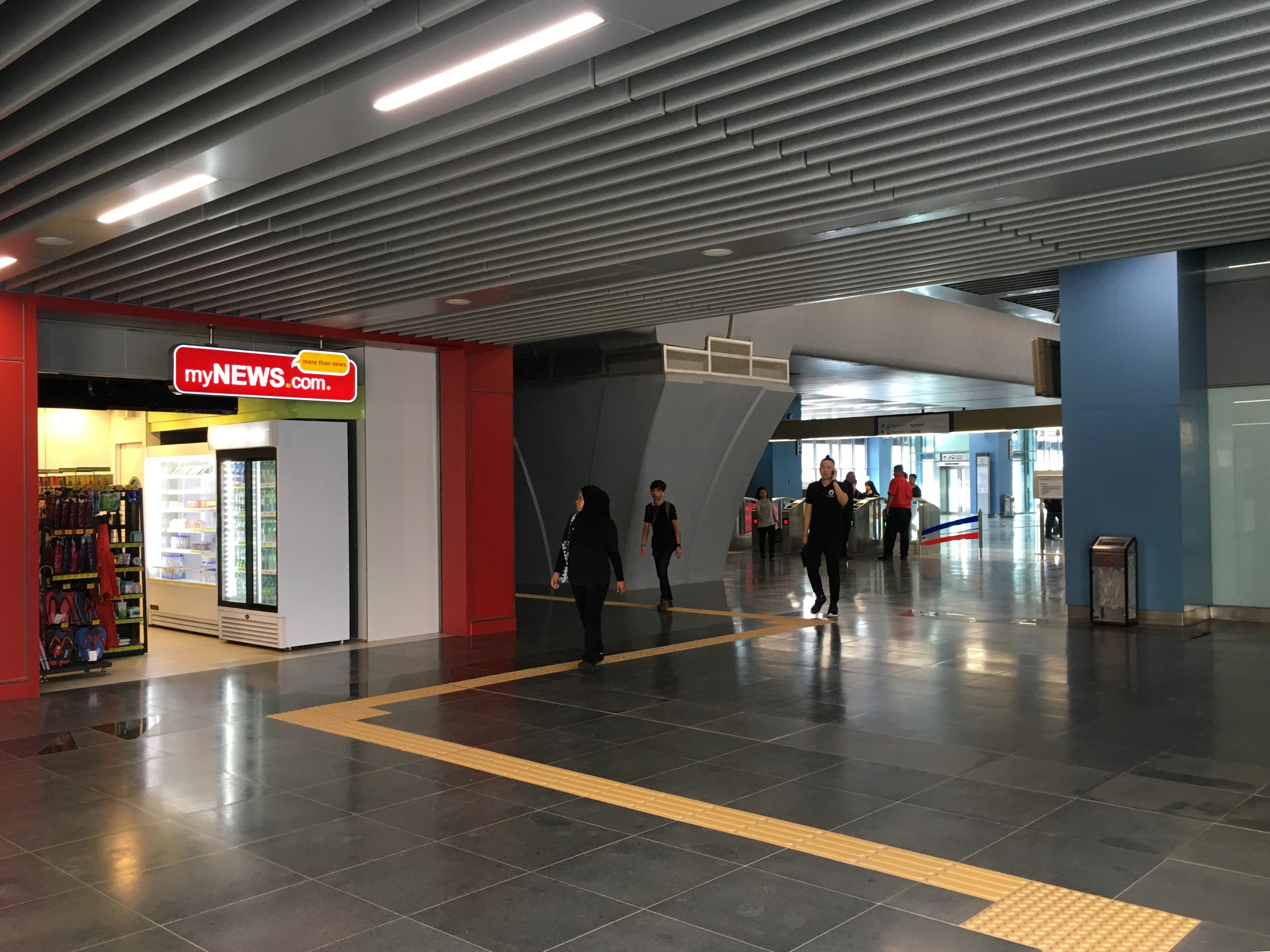
Retail outlet at the concourse level near Entrance B of the station

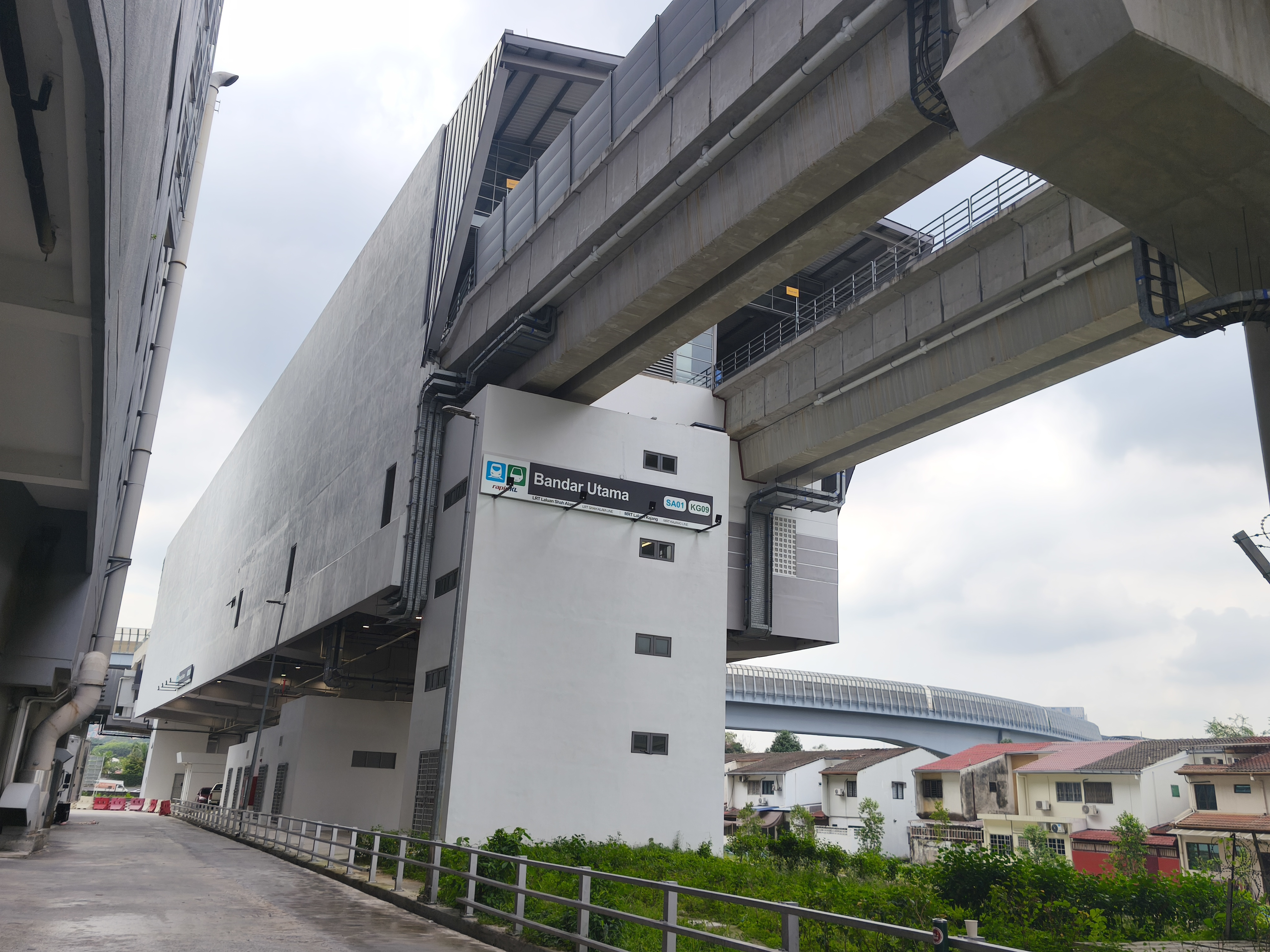
Exterior station view of the Shah Alam Line

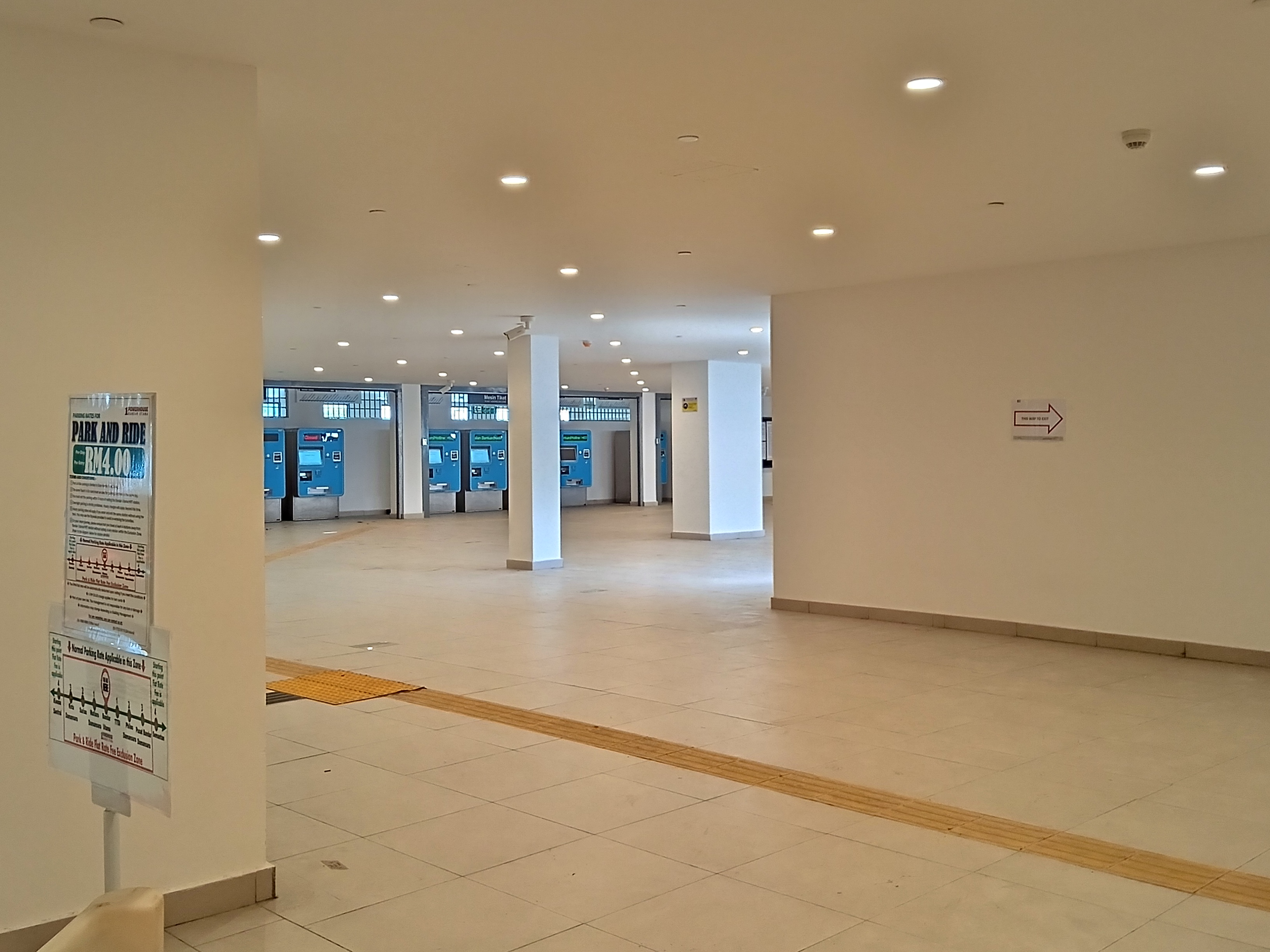
Concourse of the Shah Alam Line

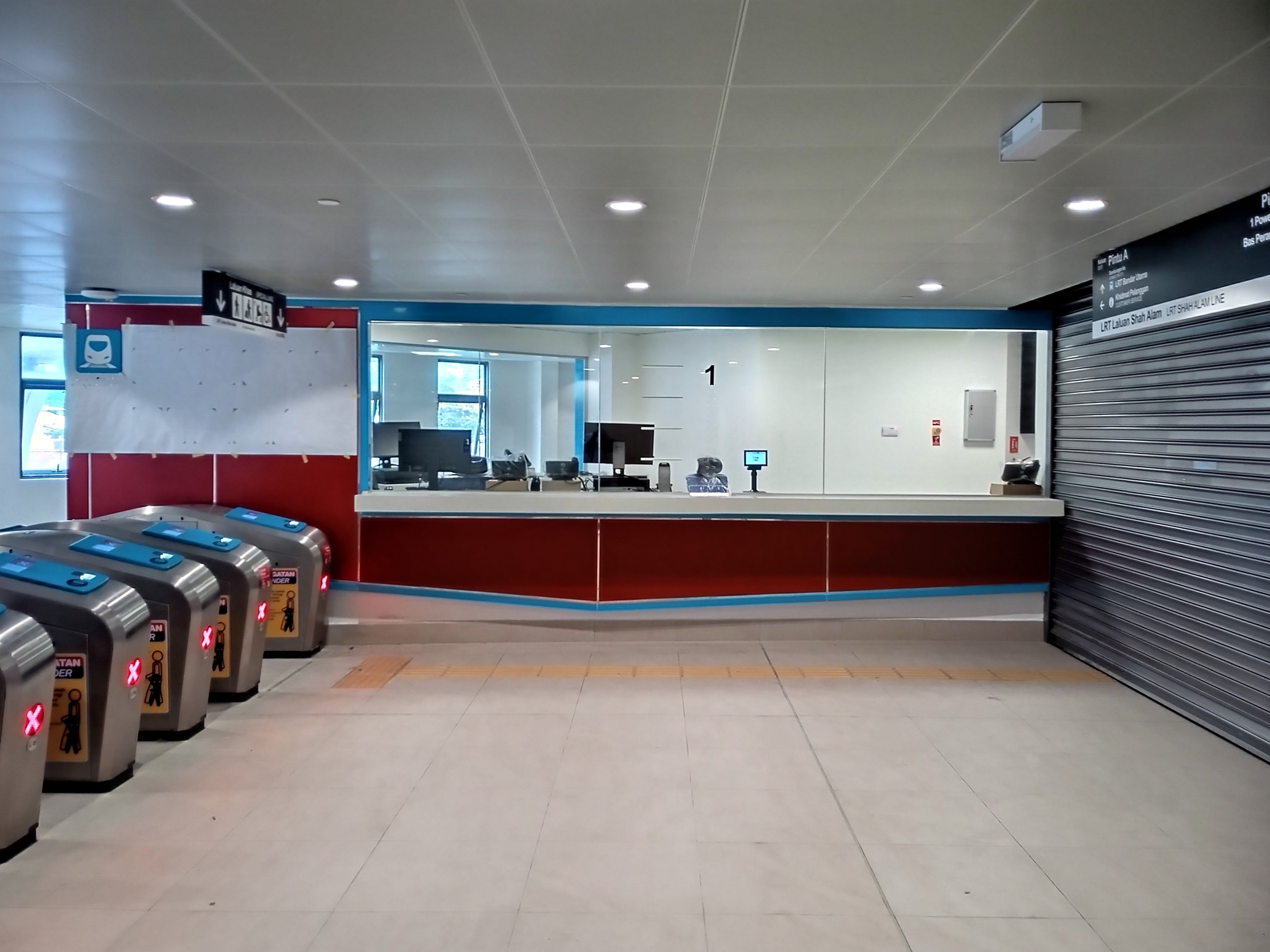
Customer service centre of the Shah Alam Line

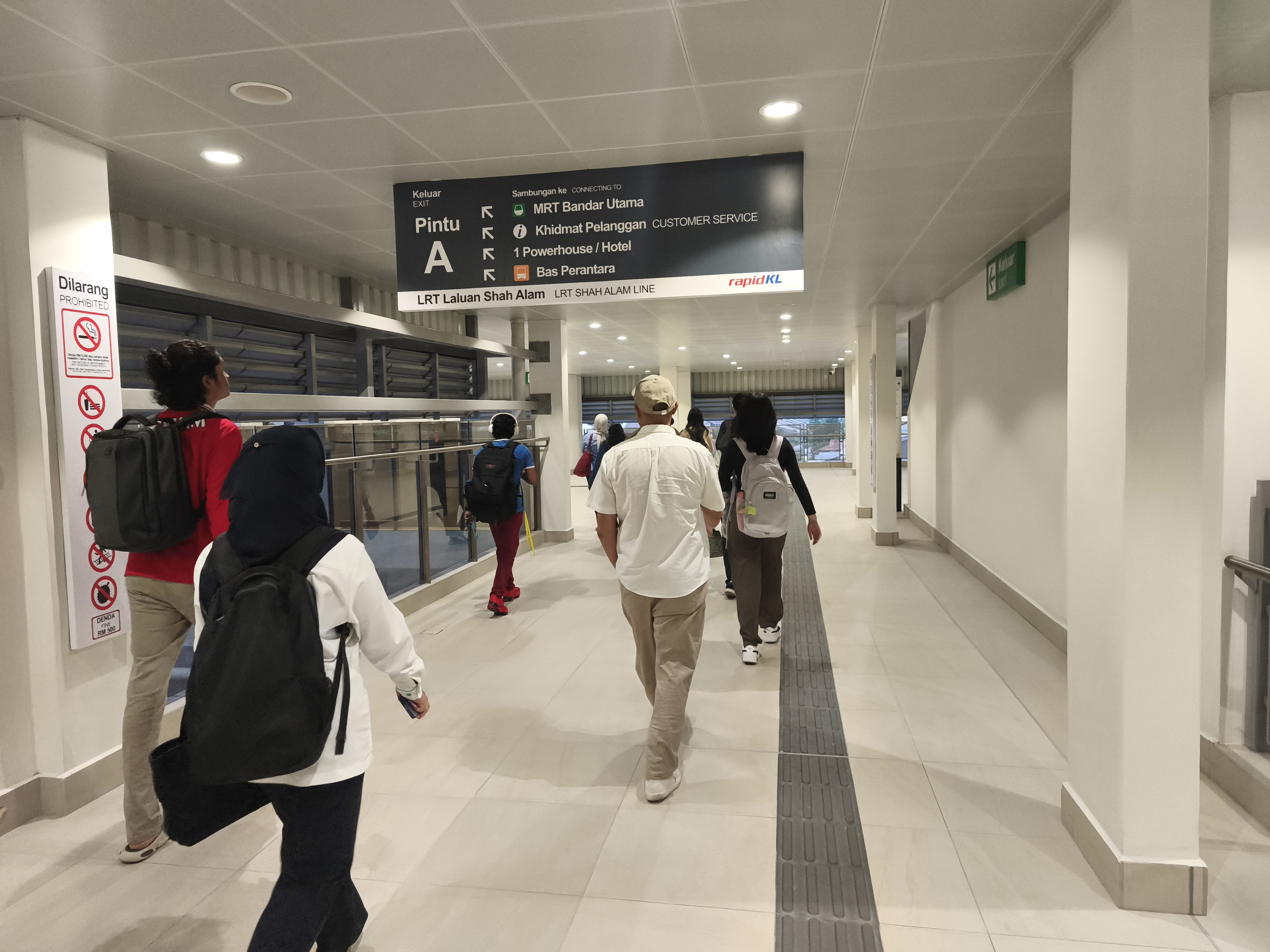
Commuters walking along the concourse level of the Shah Alam Line towards the MRT station on its opening day in June 2026

=== 1Powerhouse (Entrance A), Feeder Bus Stop and Park and Ride ===
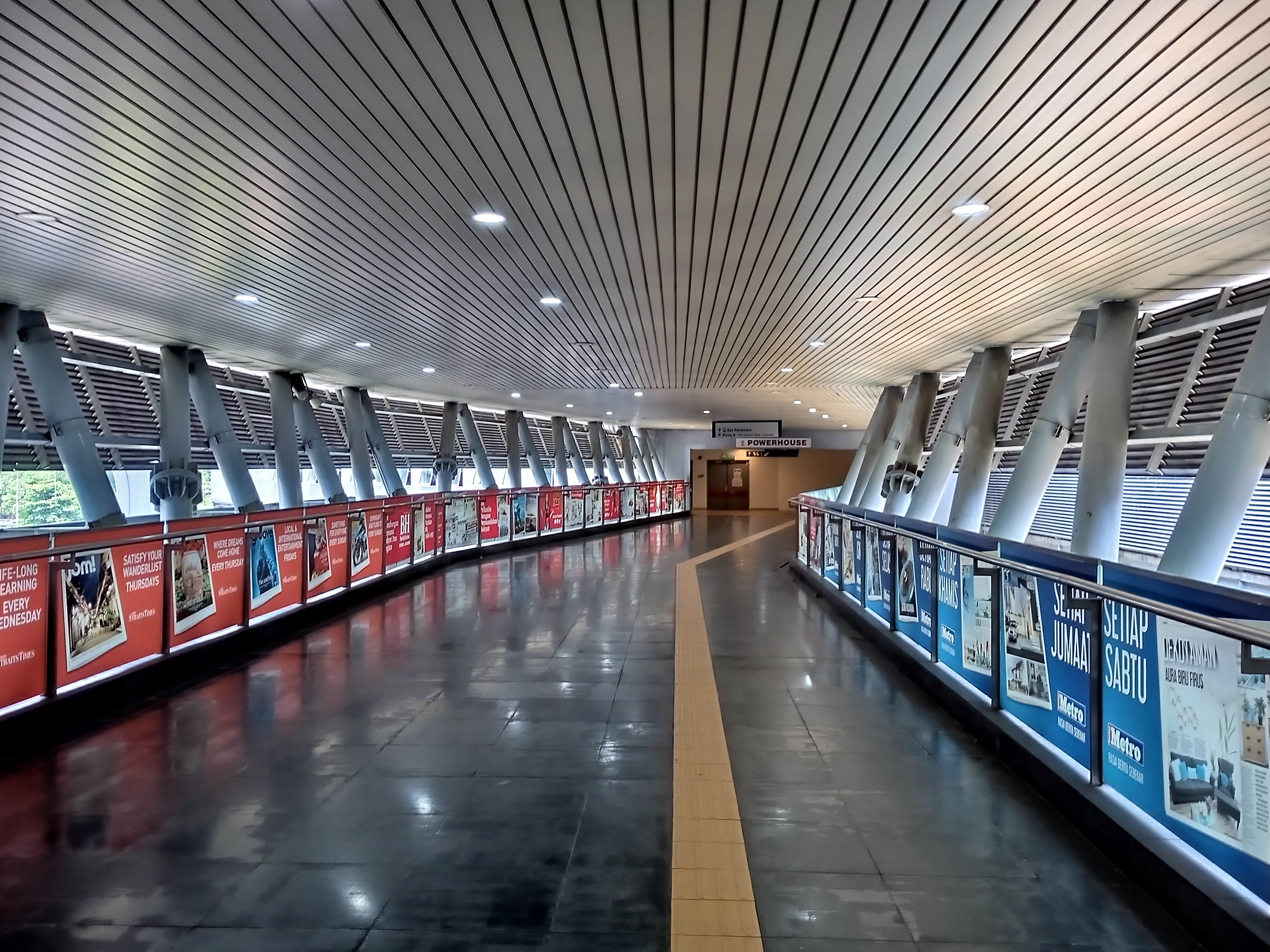
Pedestrian link over Persiaran Bandar Utama heading towards Entrance A of the station from 1Powerhouse

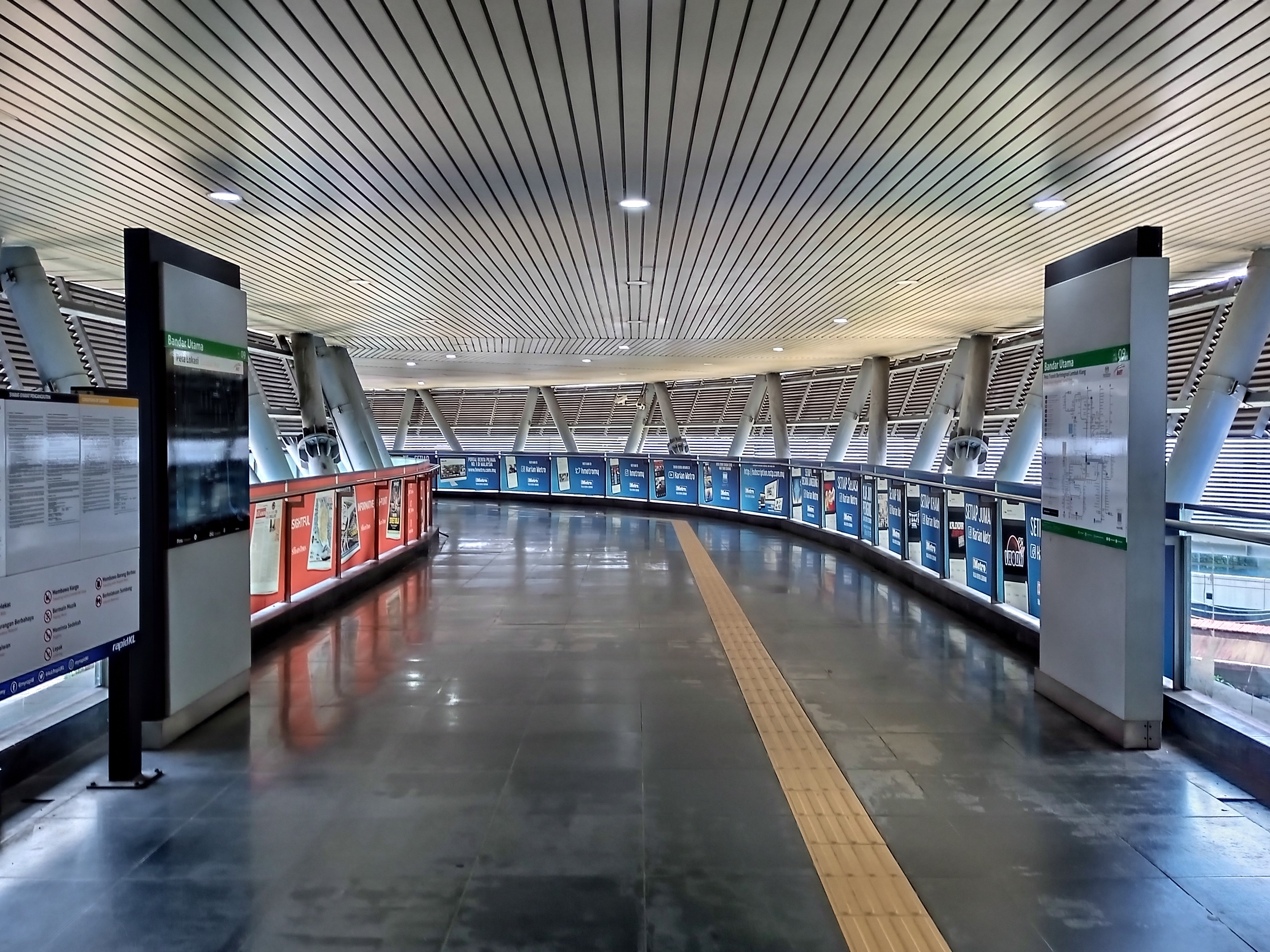
Pedestrian link heading towards 1Powerhouse from Entrance A of the station

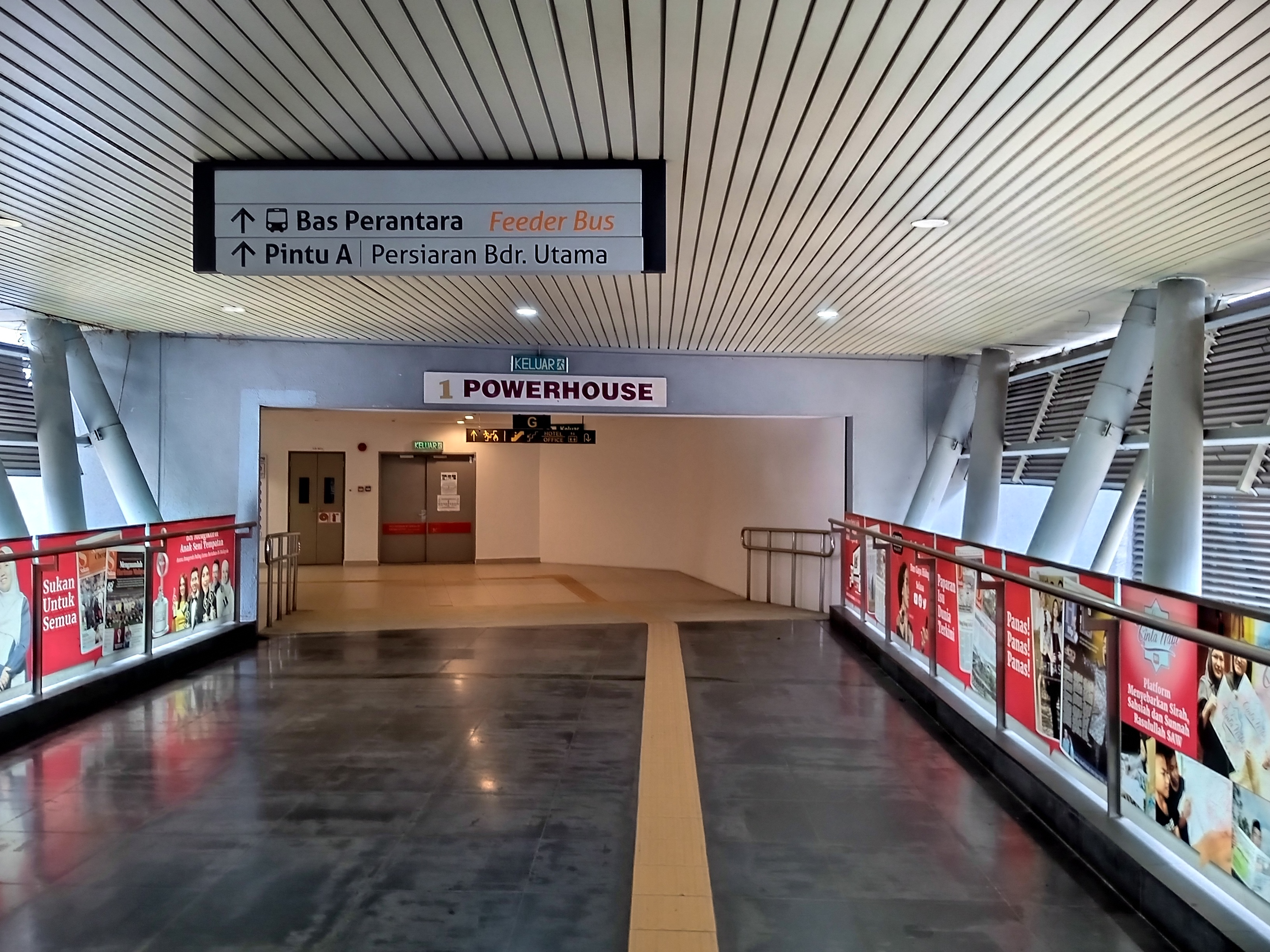
Entrance into 1Powerhouse from the pedestrian link

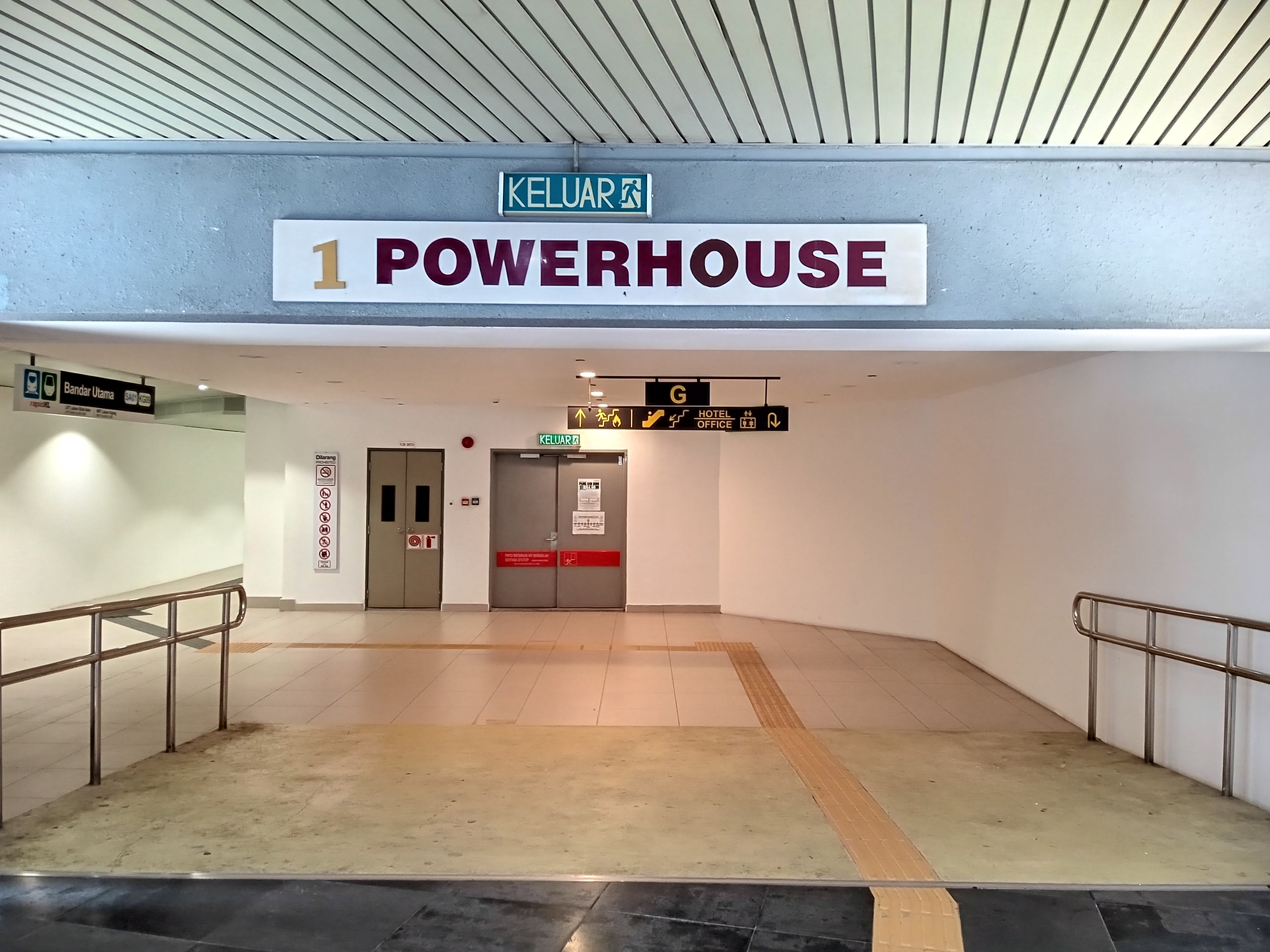
Level G concourse of the 1Powerhouse Building

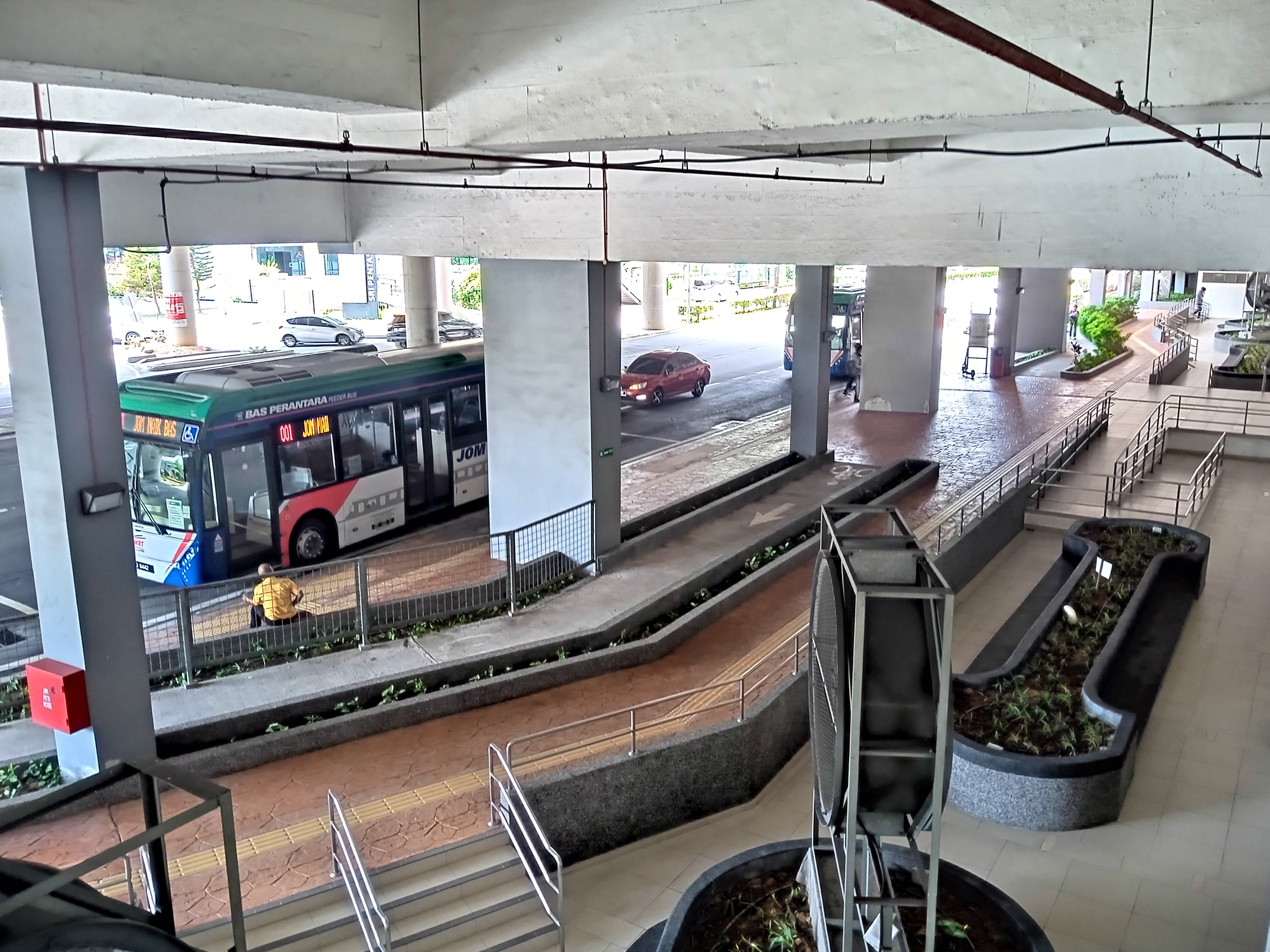
Feeder bus stop at Level C of the 1Powerhouse Building along Persiaran Bandar Utama

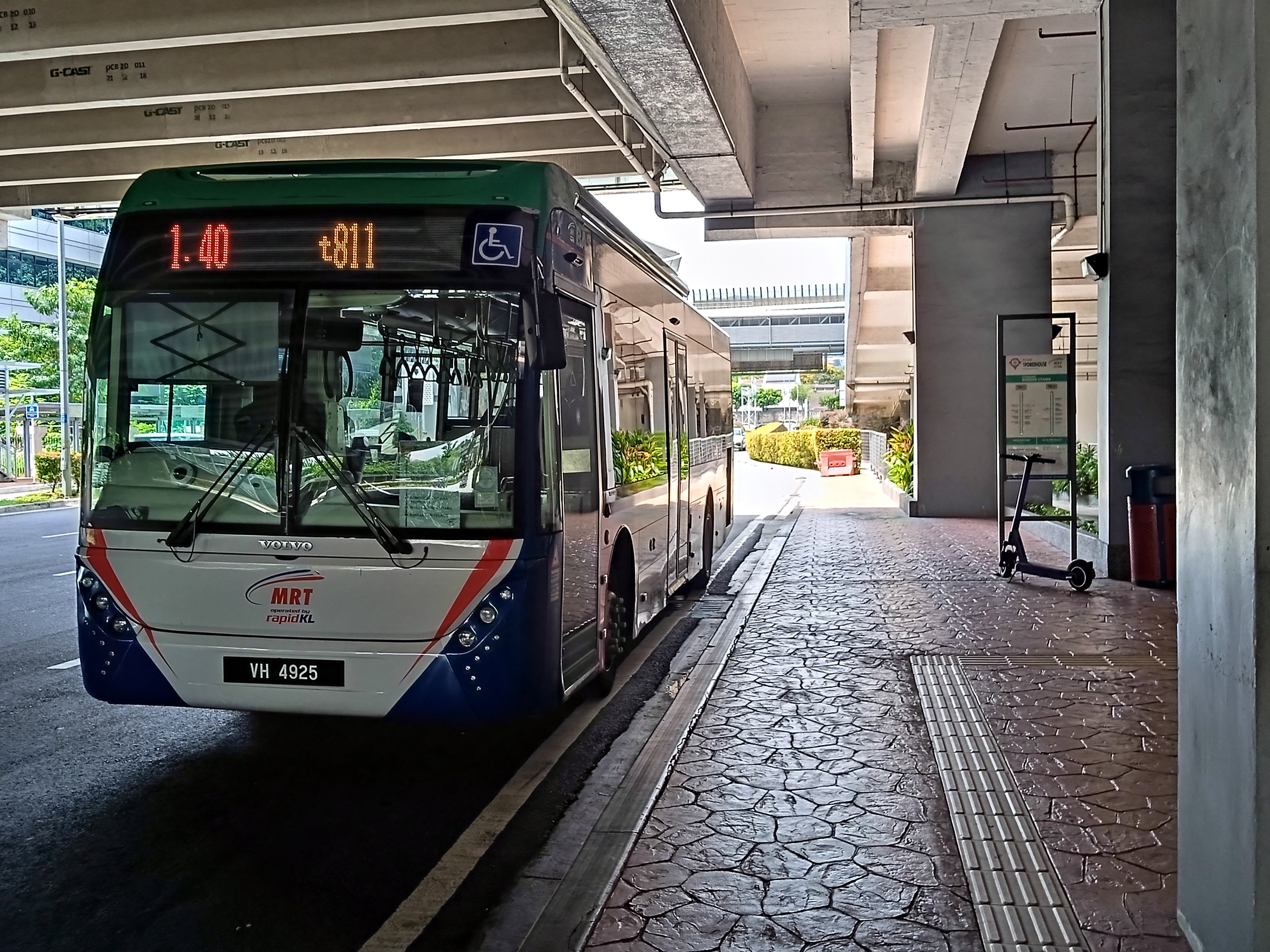
Feeder bus stop at Level C of the 1Powerhouse Building along Persiaran Bandar Utama

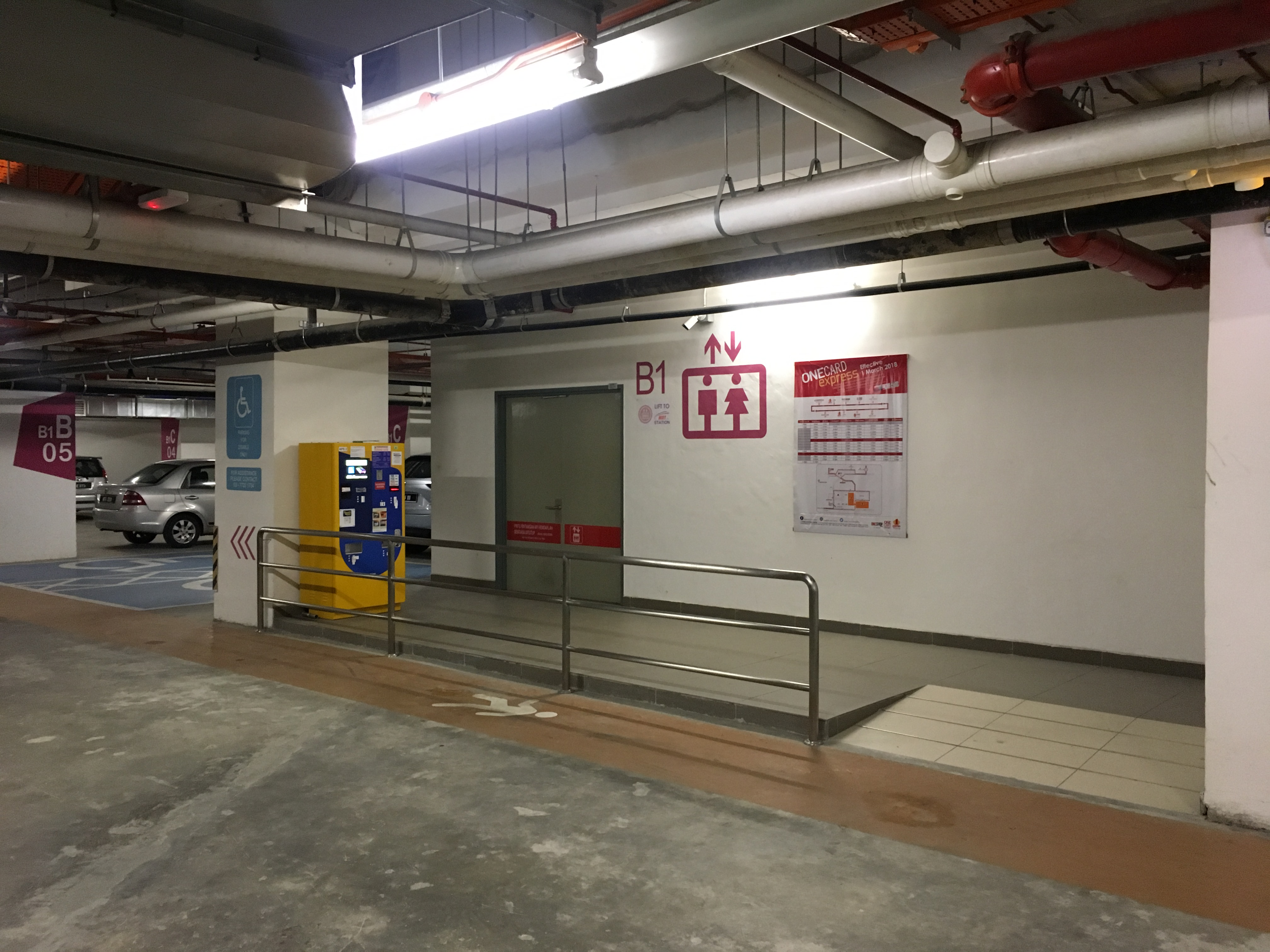
Level B1 of the 1Powerhouse Building, which is one of two park and ride levels

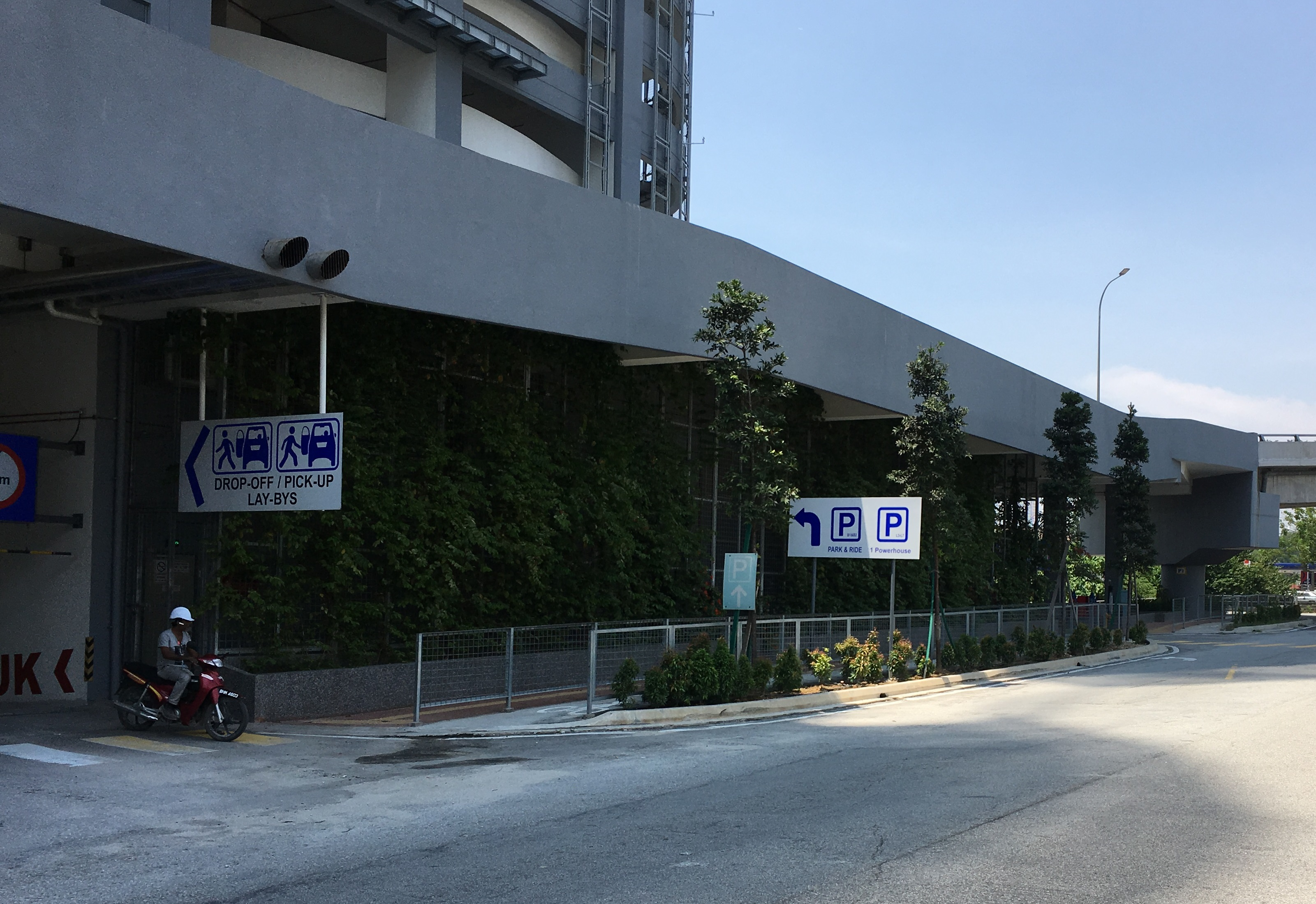
Entrances to the park and ride facility (right) and the drop-off lay-by (left) at Persiaran Bandar Utama

=== 1 Utama Pedestrian Link (Entrance B) ===
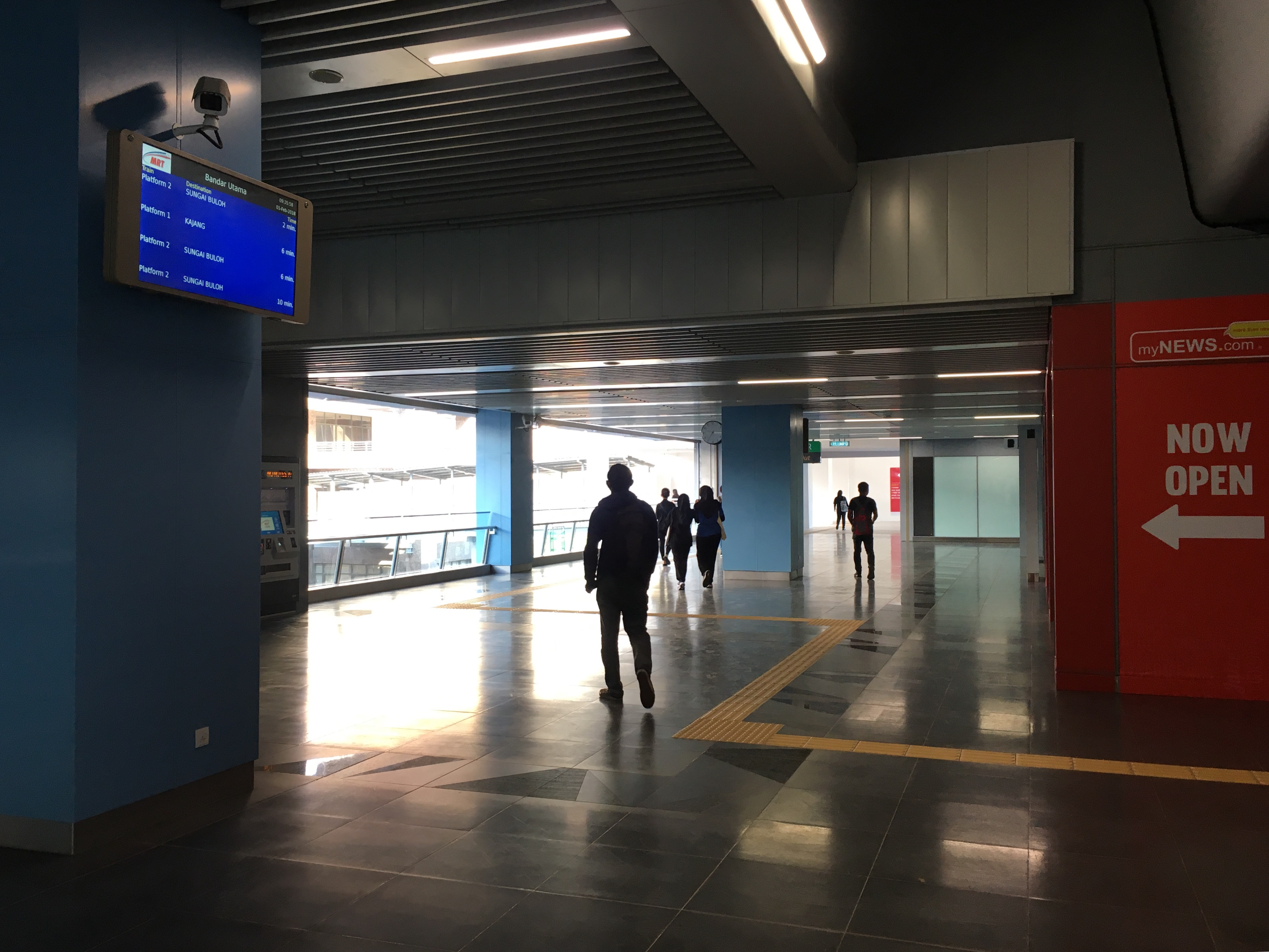
Commuters heading towards Entrance B of the station

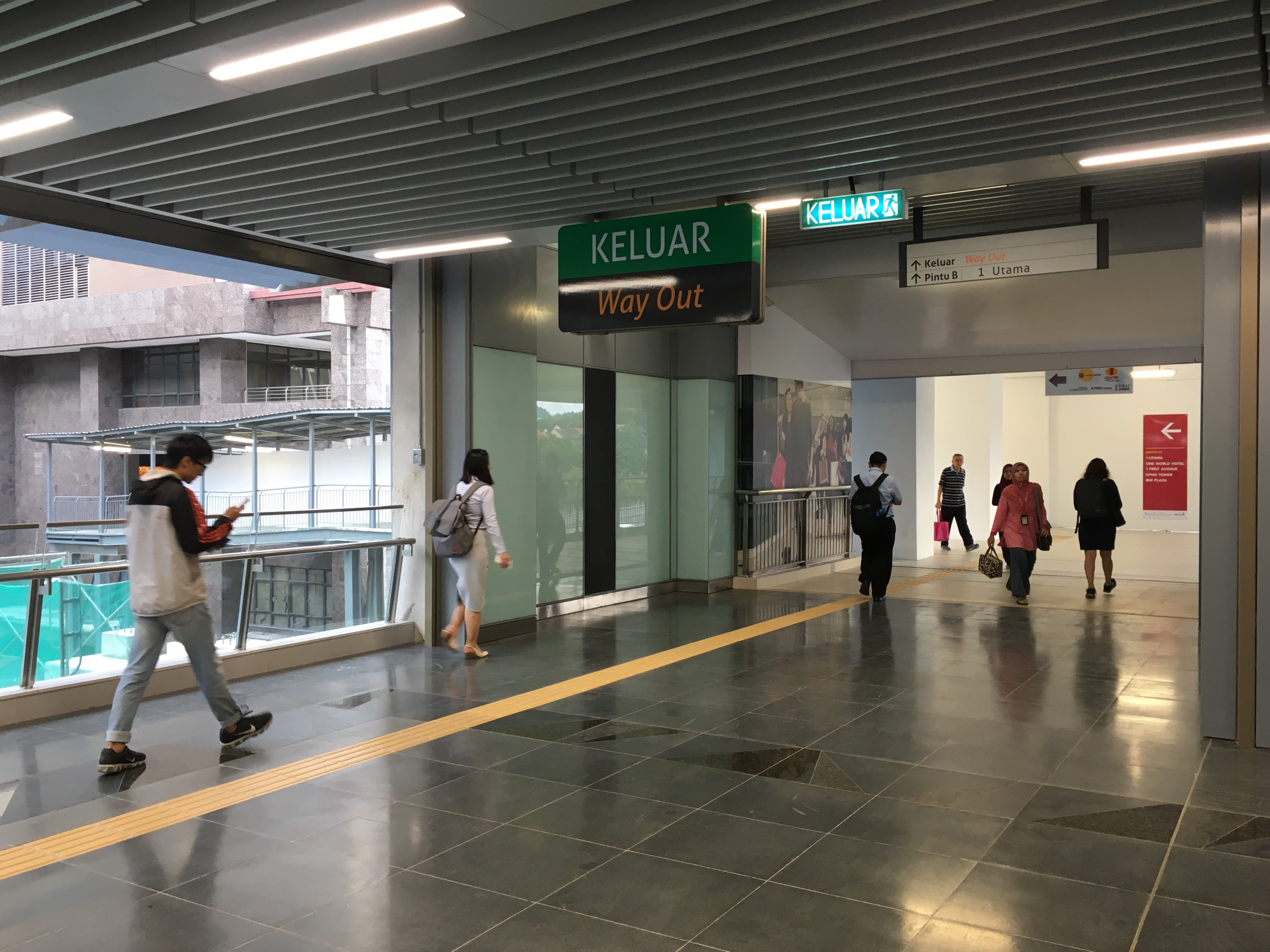
Commuters heading towards the former temporary pedestrian link to One World Hotel

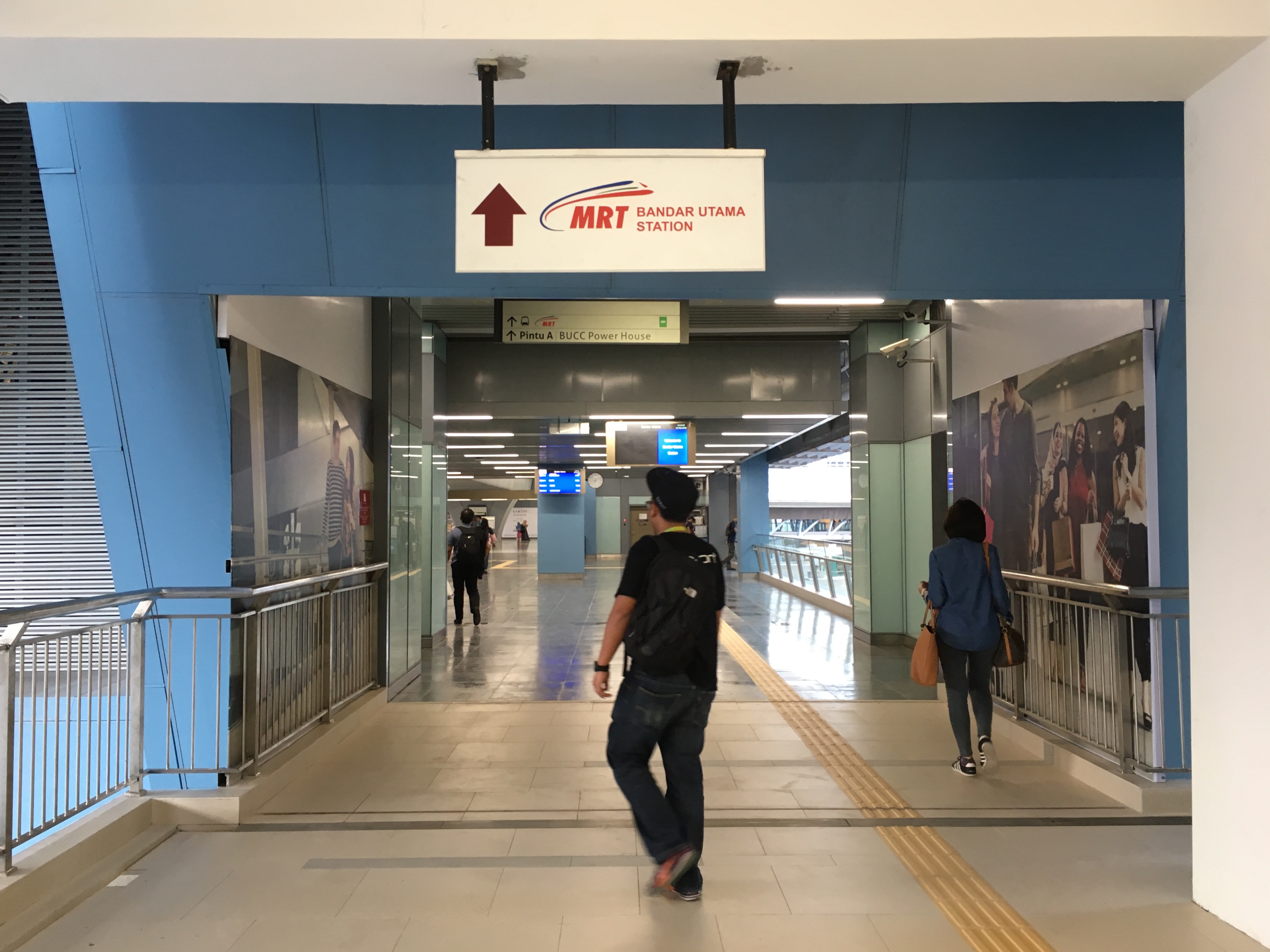
Entrance B heading into the station

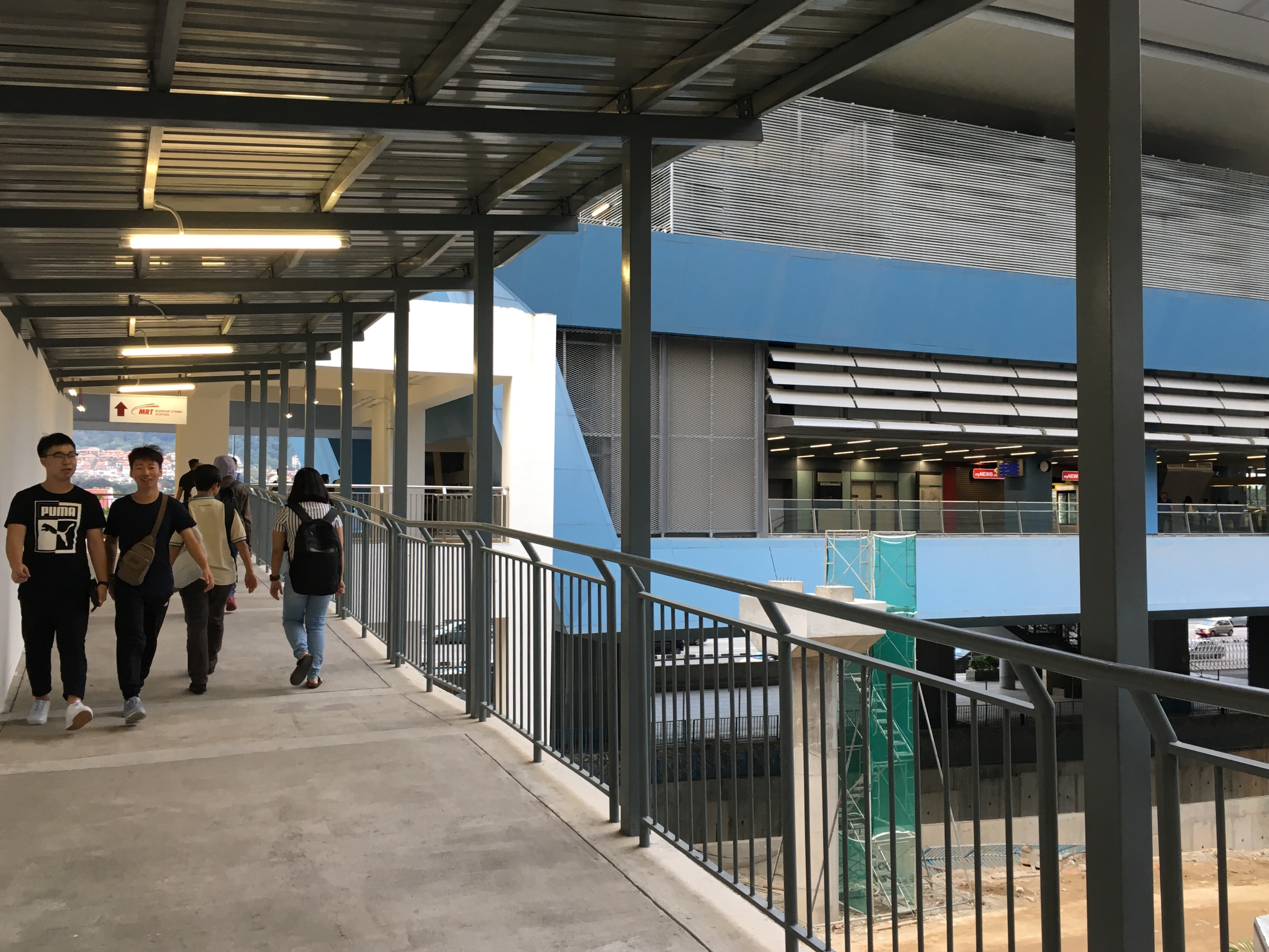
Commuters using the temporary pedestrian link leading to the station

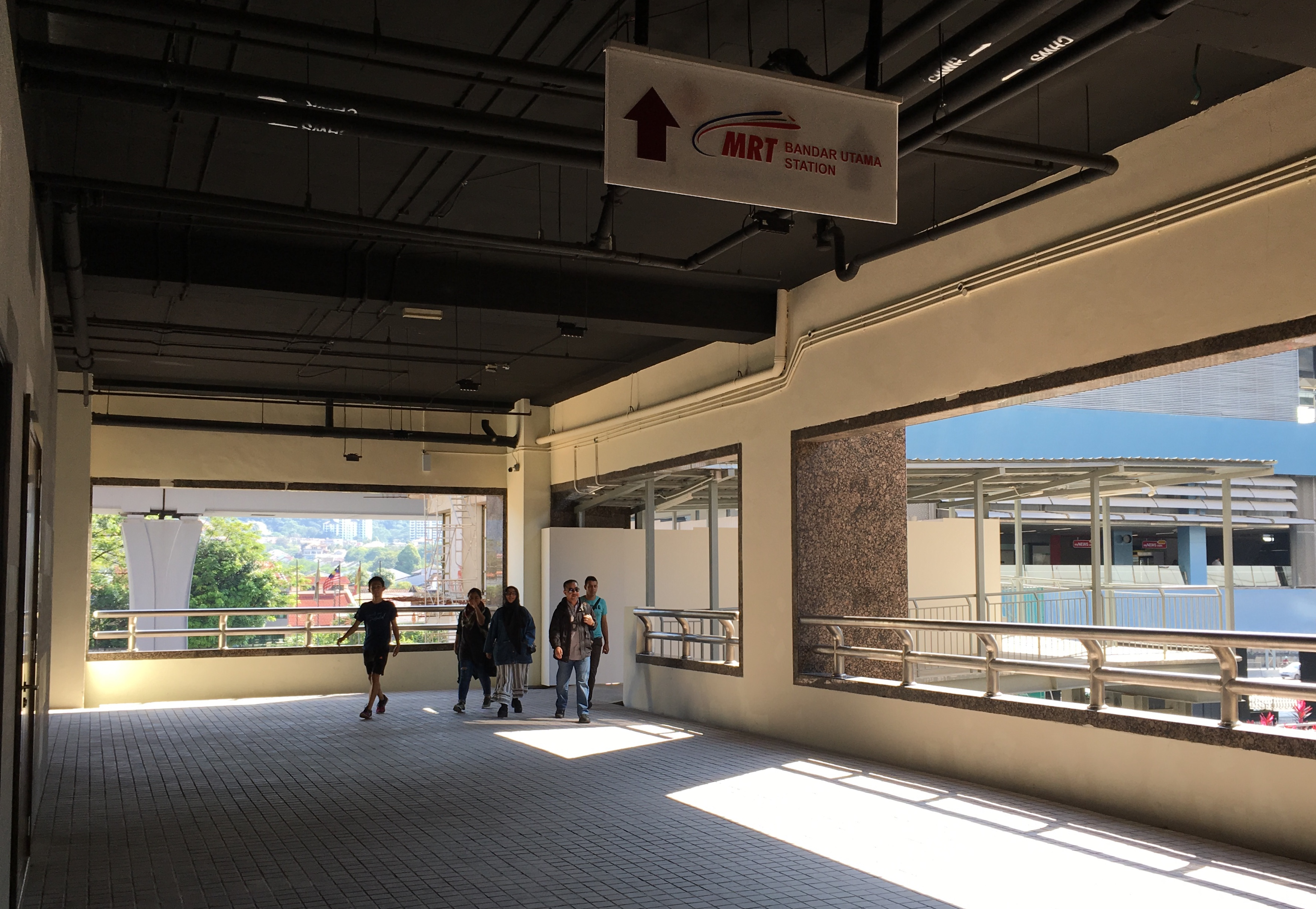
Former walkway leading to the temporary link bridge

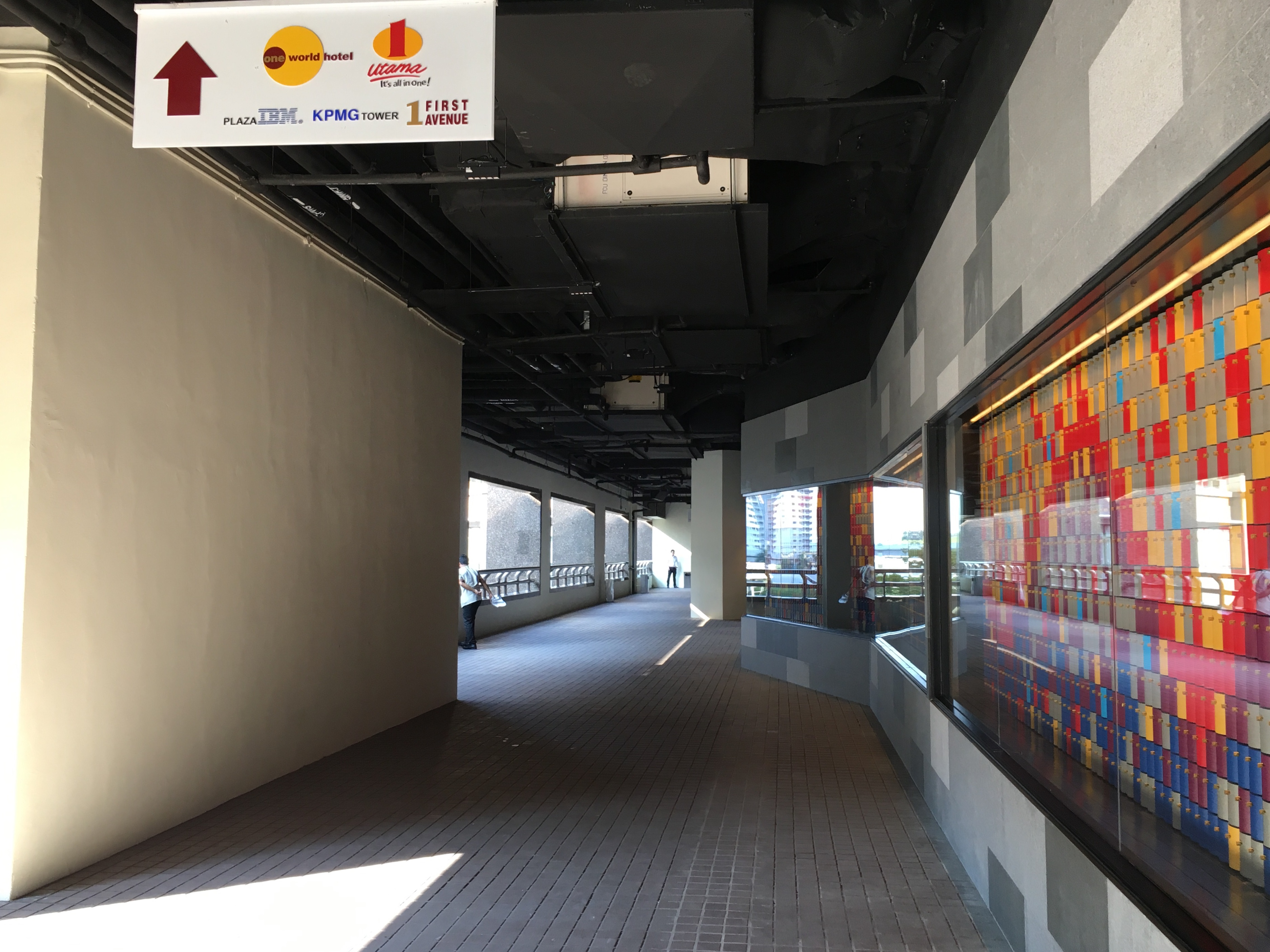
Former walkway from the station leading to One World Hotel

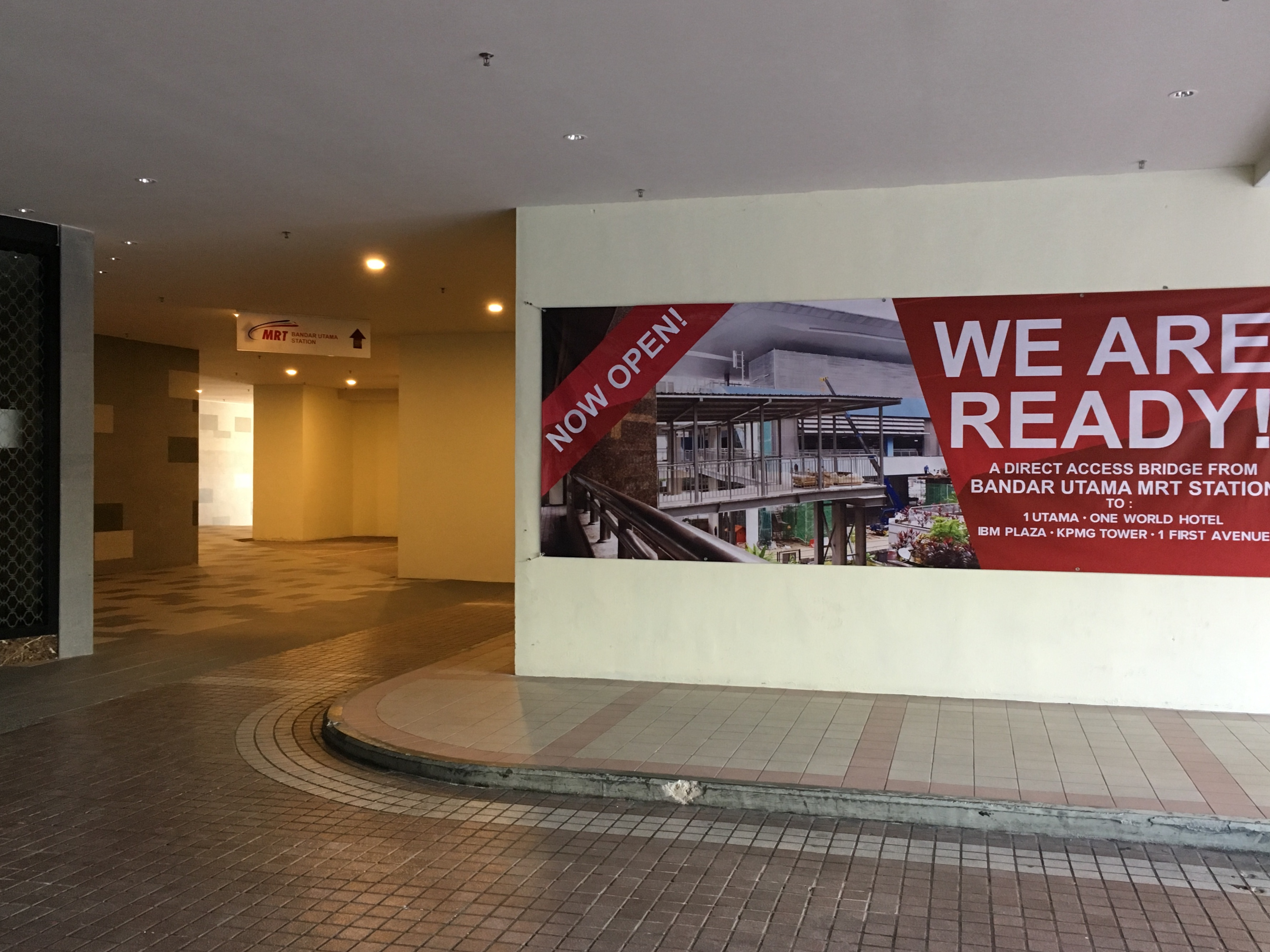
Signage near the lobby of One World Hotel announcing the opening of the temporary link to the station from the hotel

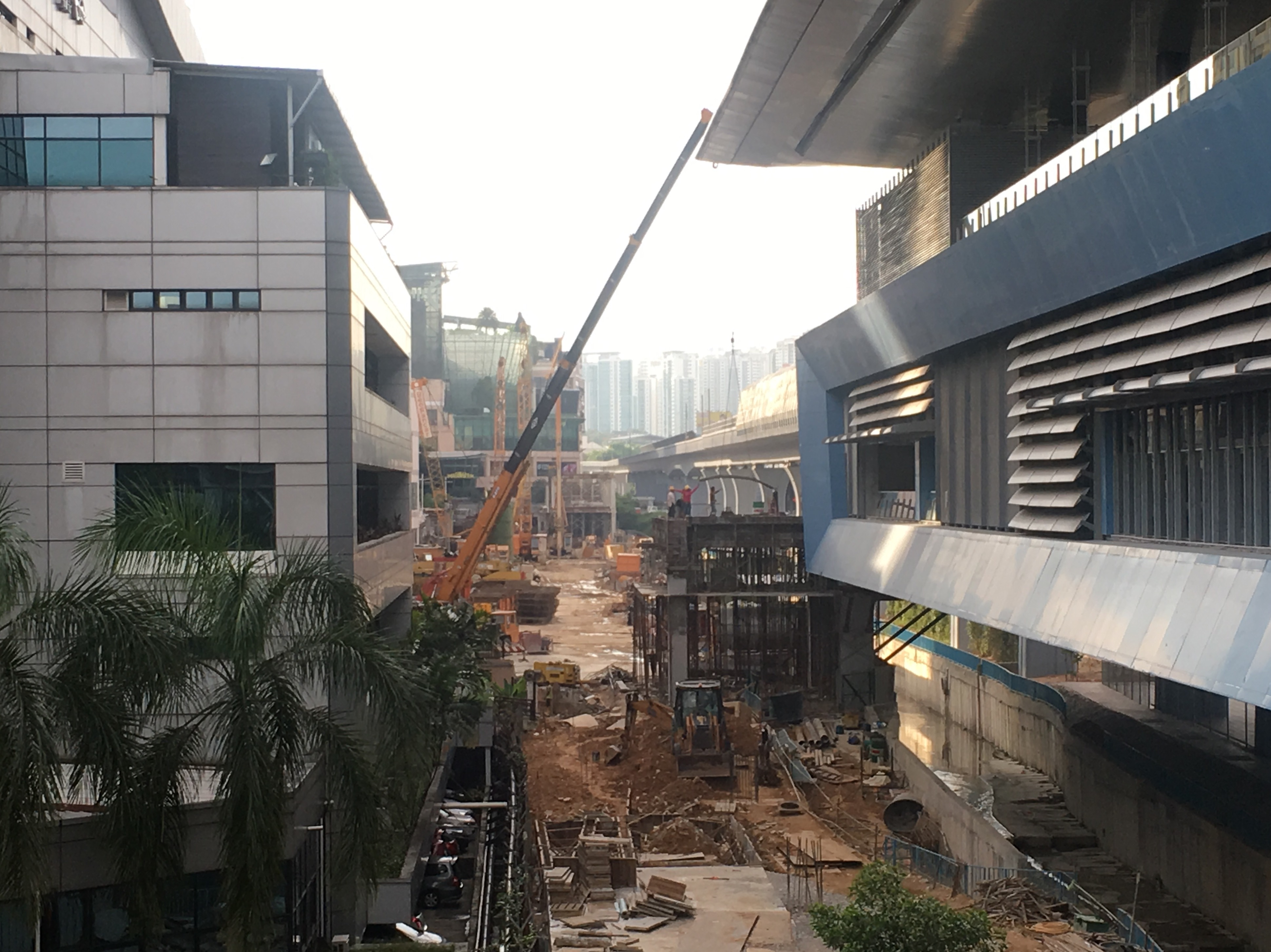
The pedestrian link bridge connecting the station with One World Hotel being constructed as at the end of June 2017

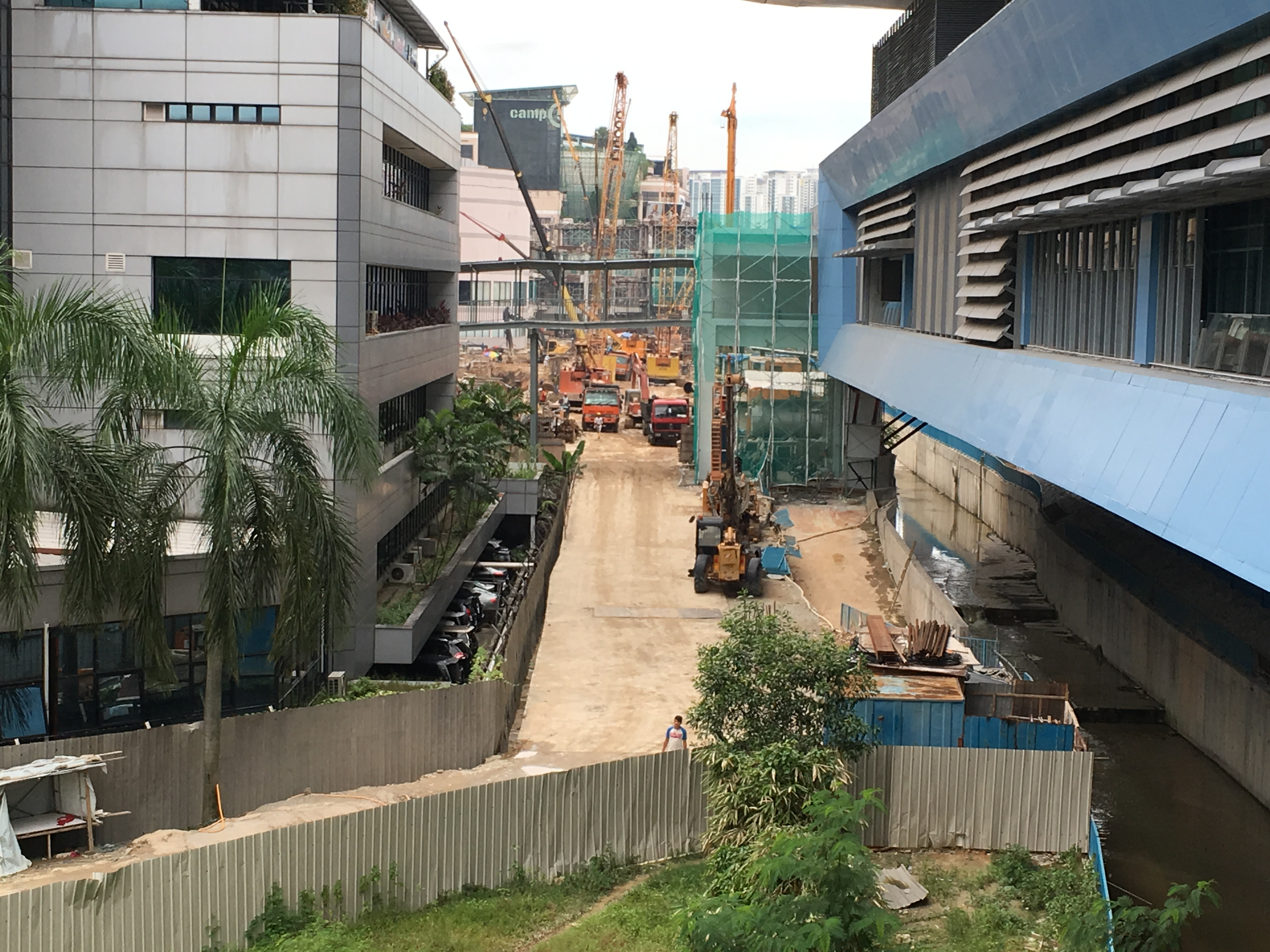
Construction of the pedestrian link bridge in October 2017

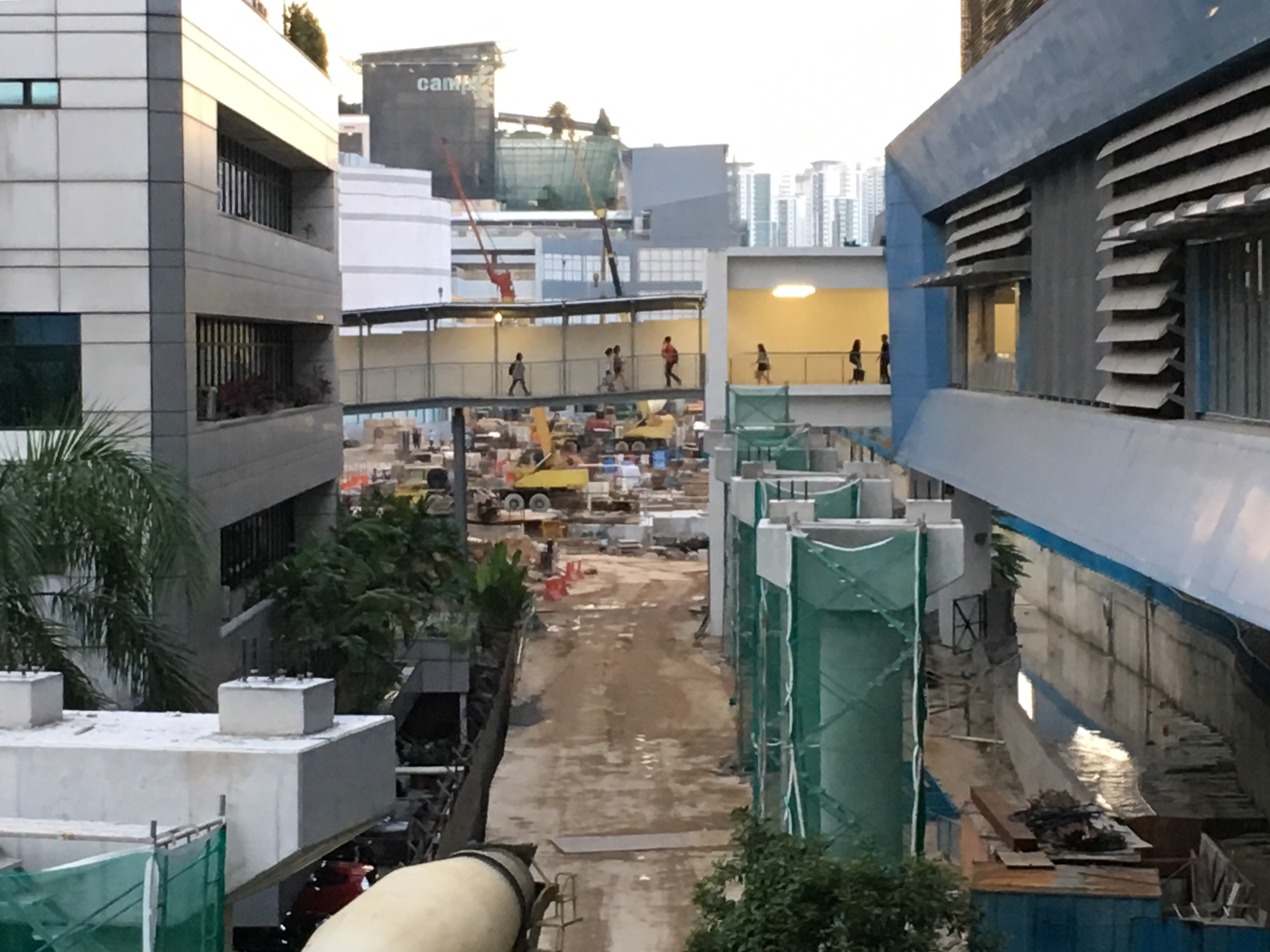
Completed and opened pedestrian link bridge in February 2018

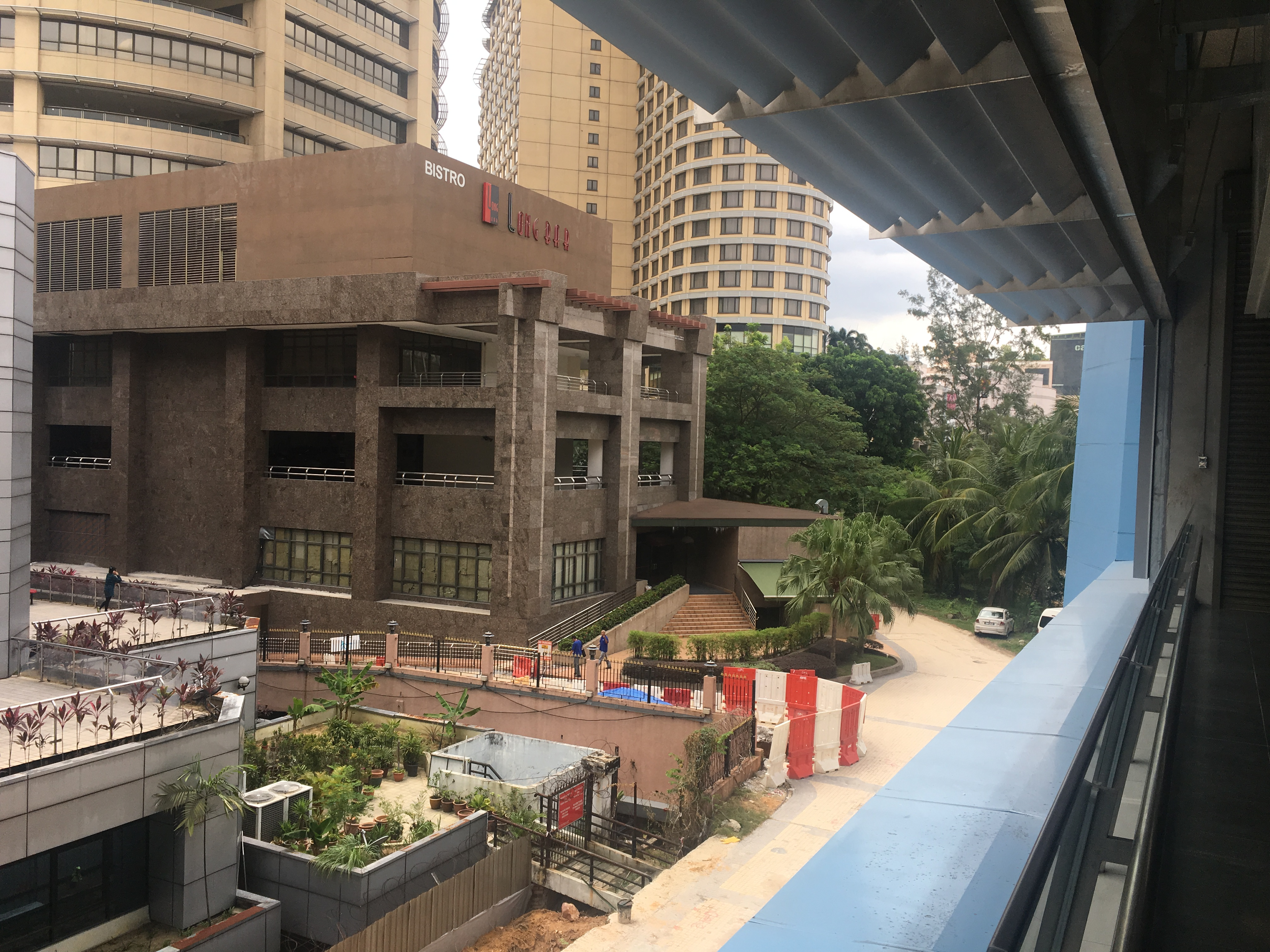
Construction of the pedestrian link bridge in February 2017

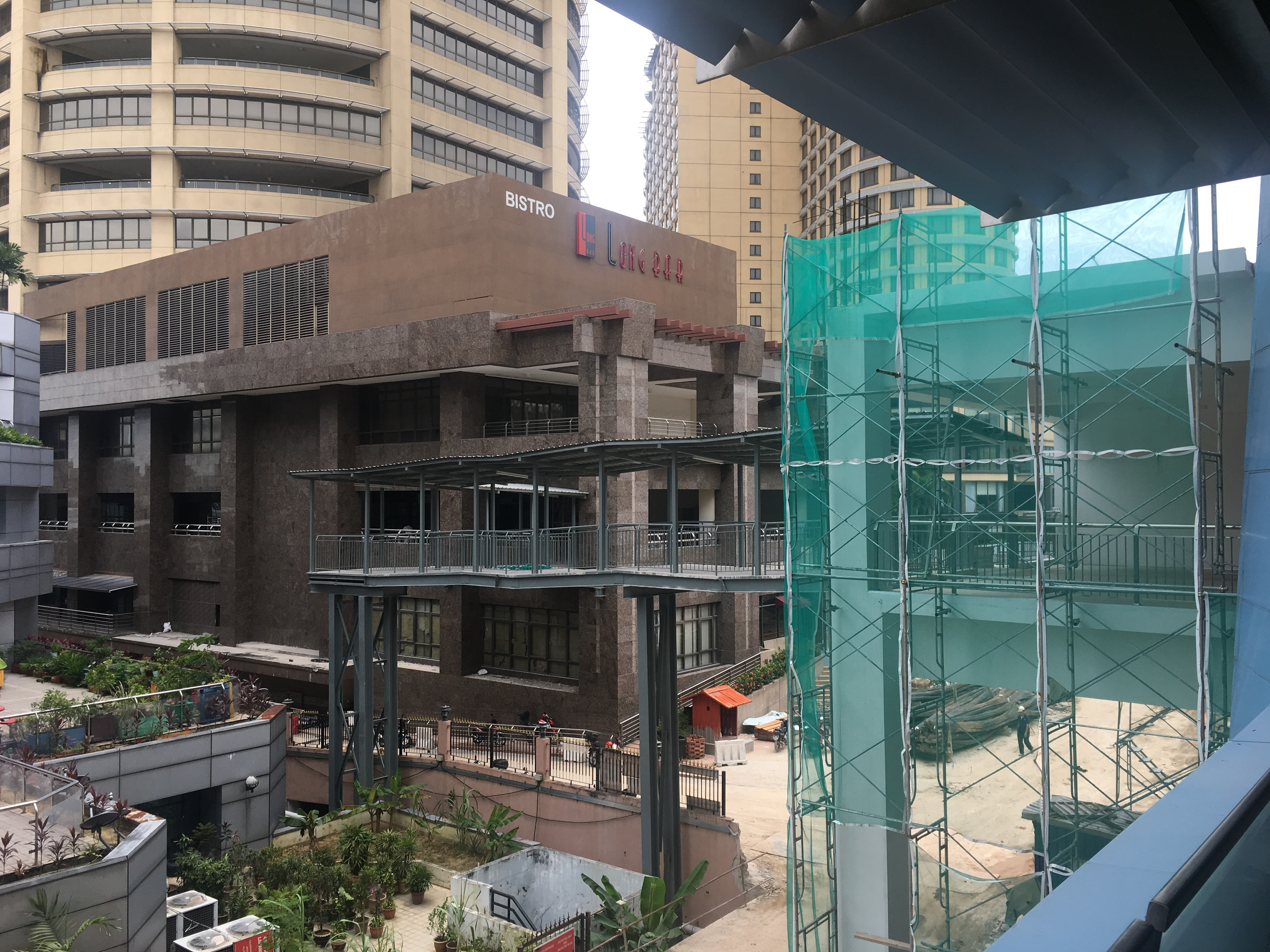
Construction of the pedestrian link bridge in October 2017

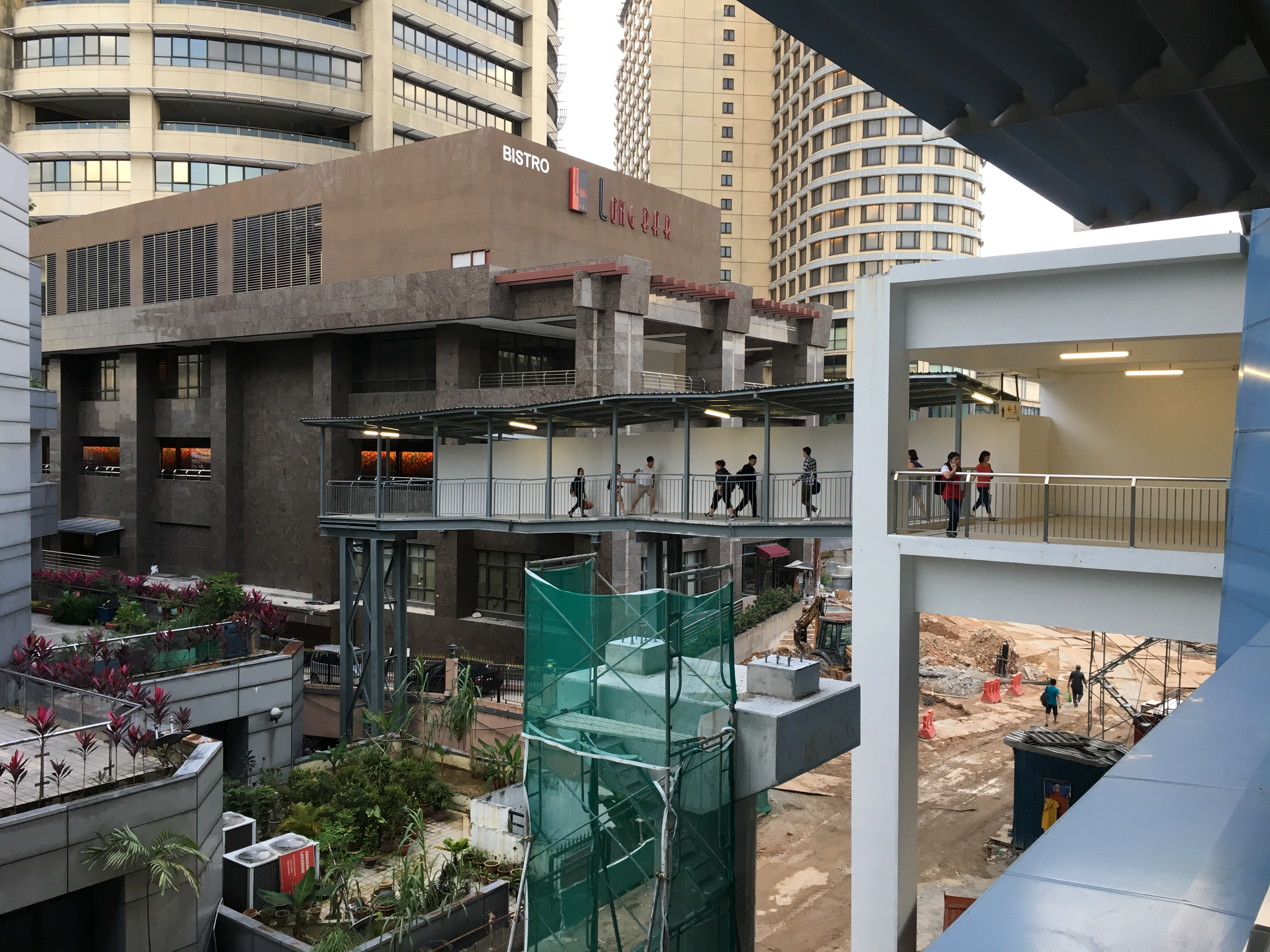
The pedestrian link bridge, the day after opening on 1 February 2018

== See also ==
- Kajang line
- Shah Alam line
- Bandar Utama
- Taman Tun Dr Ismail
- 1 Utama Shopping Centre
