= Damansara Idaman LRT station =

Metro station in Malaysia

SA05 Damansara Idaman
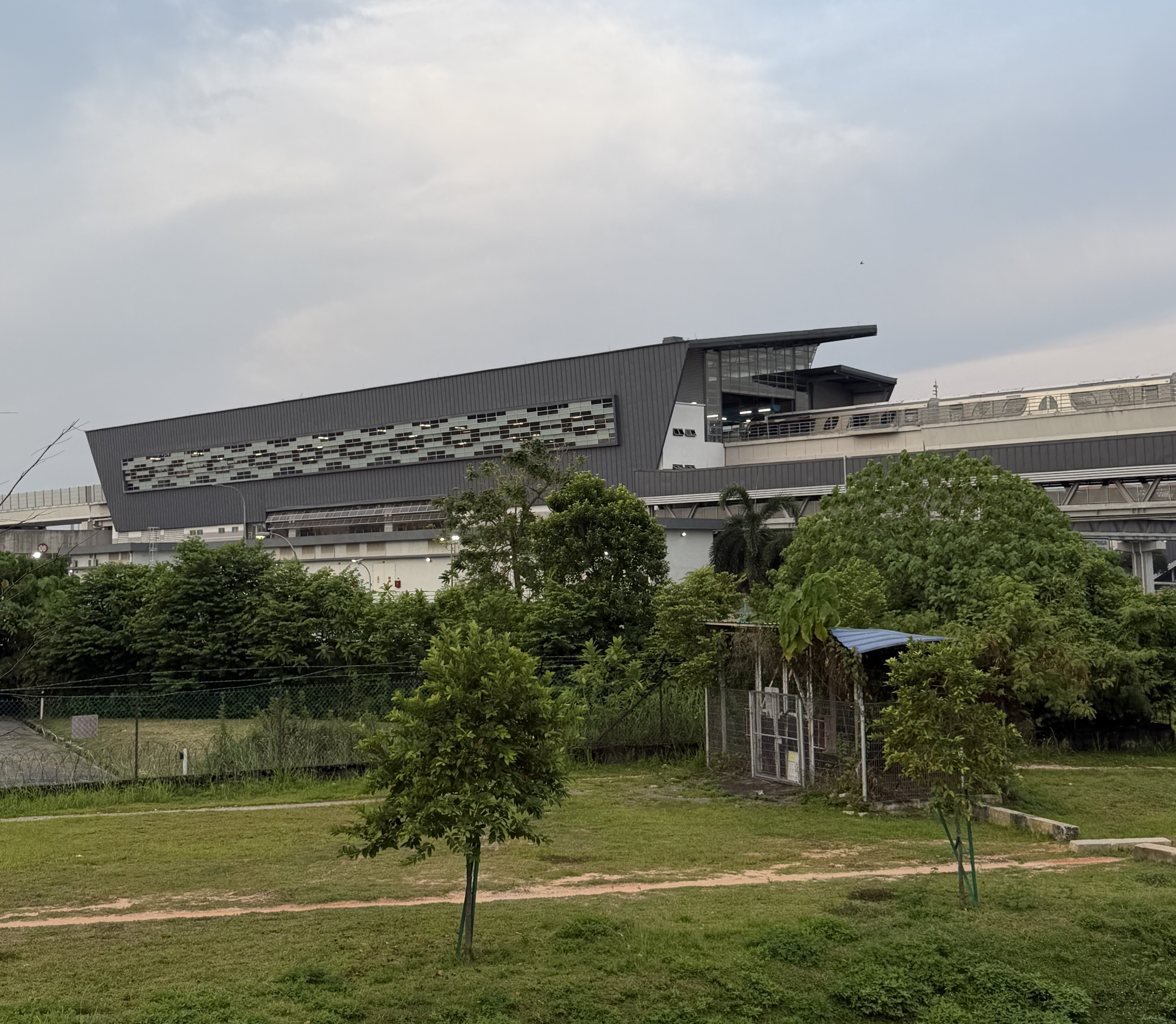
- The Damansara Idaman LRT Station outview in July 2026

General information
- Other names: Malay: دامنسارا ايدامن (Jawi); Chinese: 白沙罗依达曼; Tamil: டாமன்சாரா இடமான்
- Location: Damansara, Selangor; Malaysia
- Coordinates: 3°7′22″N 101°35′39″E
- System: Rapid KL
- Owner: Prasarana Malaysia
- Operator: Rapid Rail
- Line: 11 Shah Alam Line
- Platforms: 2 side platforms
- Tracks: 2

Construction
- Structure type: Elevated
- Parking: Available, 150 parking bays.
- Accessible: Yes

Other information
- Status: Operational
- Station code: SA05

History
- Opened: 29 June 2026; 55 days ago

Services
Preceding station		Following station
BU 11 towards Bandar Utama	Shah Alam Line	Subang towards Johan Setia
Tropicana towards Bandar Utama	Shah Alam Line Future service (2031)	Subang towards Johan Setia
Location

The Damansara Idaman LRT station is a light rapid transit (LRT) station that serves the suburb of Petaling Jaya in Selangor, Malaysia. It is served as one of the stations on the Shah Alam line, opened on 29 June 2026.

== History ==
This is the fifth station along the RM9 billion line project, with the line's maintenance depot located in Johan Setia, Klang. It has facilities such as Park and Ride, kiosks, restrooms, elevators, a taxi stand and feeder bus.

== Locality landmarks ==
- Damansara Idaman
- Damansara Legenda
- PJU1 / PJU1A
- Taman Bukit Mayang Emas
- Dataran Prima
- Aman Suria
- Maisson Residence
- Arrows International Secondary School
- Taipan Ara Damansara
- Prima Avenue
- Mutiara Oriental Condominium

== Station Features ==
The station adopts the standard elevated station design for the Shah Alam Line, with two side platforms above the concourse level and two entrances/exits. The station is located within the boundaries of the New Klang Valley Expressway (NKVE) beside the Shell petrol station layby at KM 15.8 of the expressway.

Similar to the Bandar Utama station, the station does not have a direct access to the ground floor level surrounding the station building due to it being located within the boundary of a busy highway. The exit/entrances of the station directly serves the neighbouring township areas.

=== Station layout ===
L2	Platform; Level	Side platform, doors open on the left
L2	Platform; Level	→ Platform 1: 11 Shah Alam Line towards SA01 Bandar Utama (BU 11)
L2	Platform; Level	← Platform 2: 11 Shah Alam Line towards SA26 Johan Setia (Subang)
L2	Platform; Level	Side platform, doors open on the left
L1	Concourse	Faregates to paid area, escalators, lifts, ticketing machines, customer service counter
G	Ground Level	Feeder Bus Stop (Entrance B), Taxi Lay-By

=== Exits and entrances ===
The station has two entrances. Entrance A is situated on the western side of the NKVE and connects commuters to the PJU 1A townships and the station's Park N' Ride facility. Entrance B is situated on the eastern side of the NKVE and connects commuters to the PJU 1 township and feeder bus services.

Shah Alam Line station
Entrance	Location	Destination	Picture
A	Damansara Idaman	Damansara Idaman; Idaman Villas; Damansara Lagenda; Taman Putra Damai; Park N' Ride	
B	Jalan Bukit Mayang Emas	Pusat Komersial Aman Suria; Taman Bukit Mayang Emas; Dataran Prima; Kampung Cempaka	

== Feeder Bus ==
Route No.	Origin	Destination	Via	Connecting to
T780	SA03 BU 11	Taman Mayang Emas / Muitiara Tropicana; KJ24 Kelana Jaya	Persiaran Tropicana; Jalan Bukit Mayang Emas; SA05 Damansara Idaman; Jalan SS 25/23; Damansara–Puchong Expressway	783, T781, T807

== Gallery ==
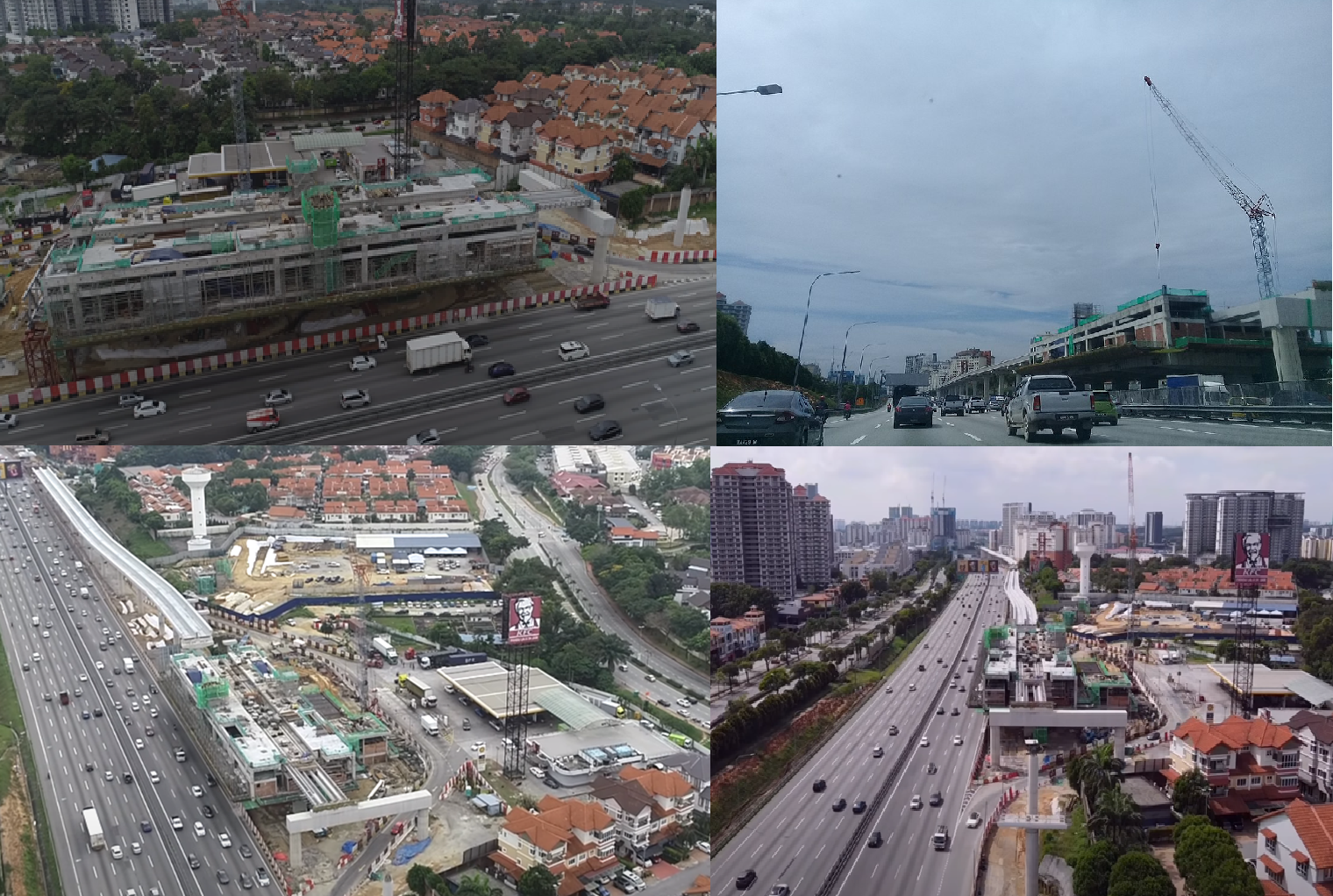
Multiple views of the station under construction in 2021

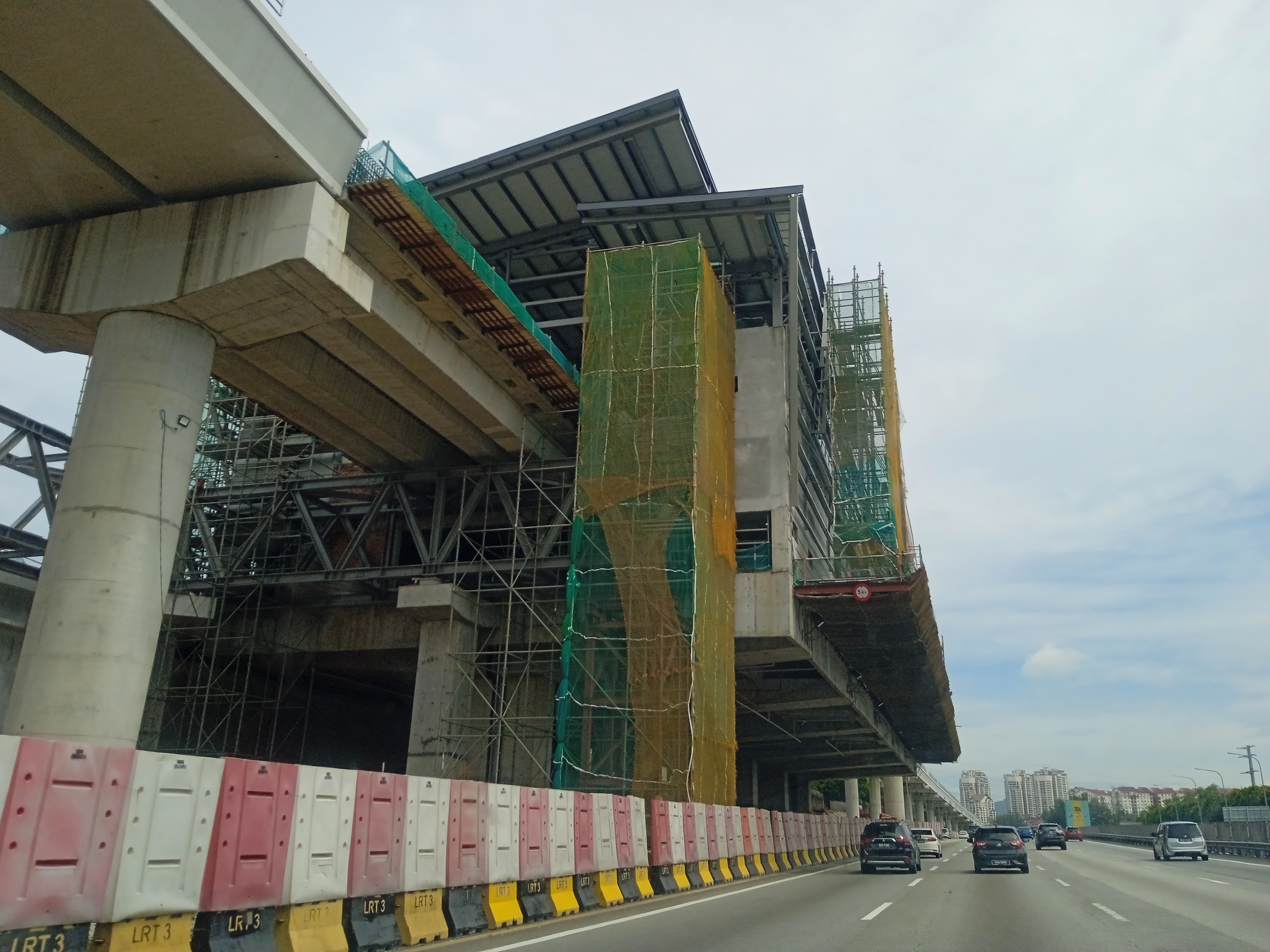
Views of the station under construction in 2022

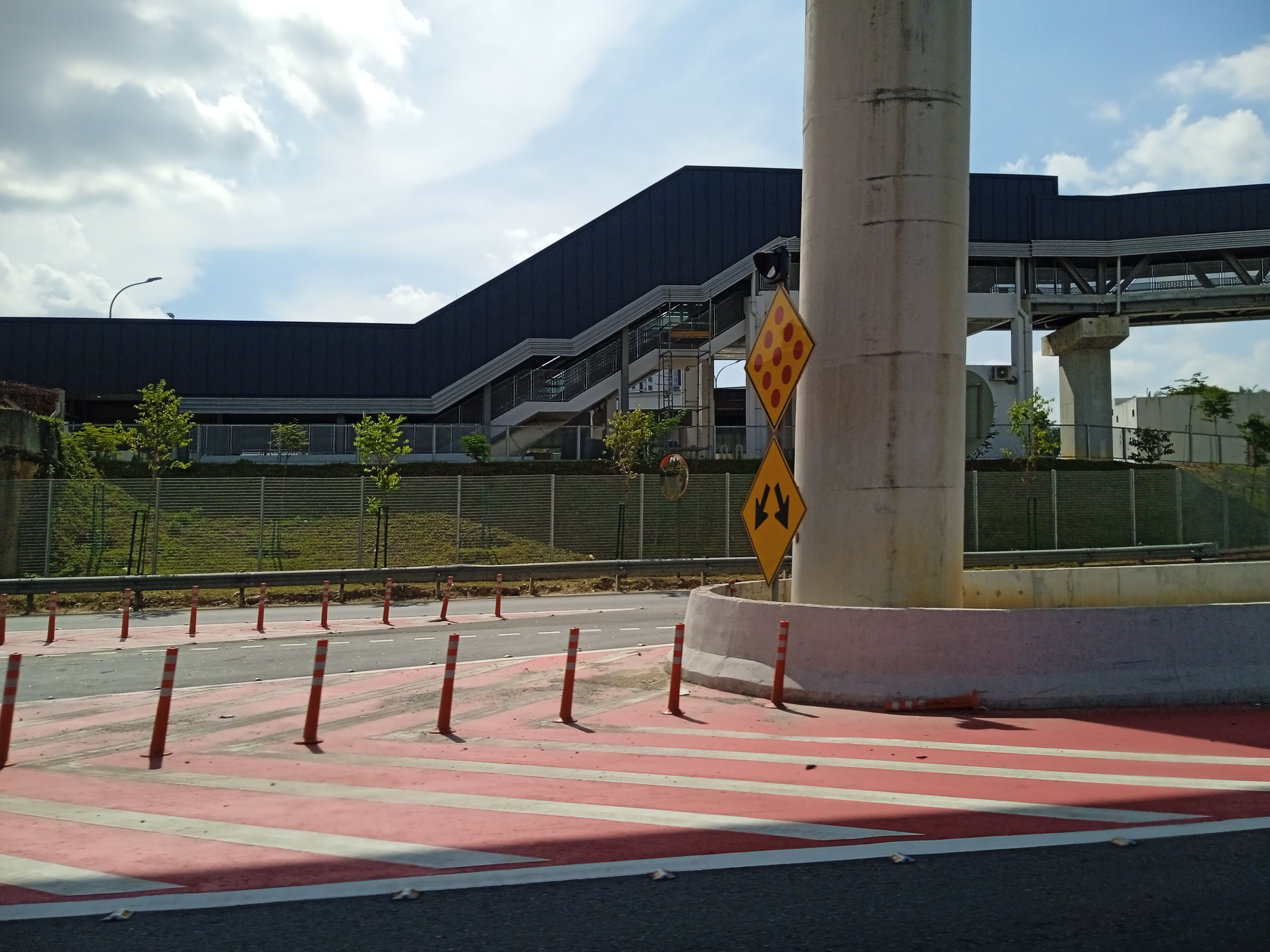
View of the western entrance (Entrance A) from NKVE in 2025

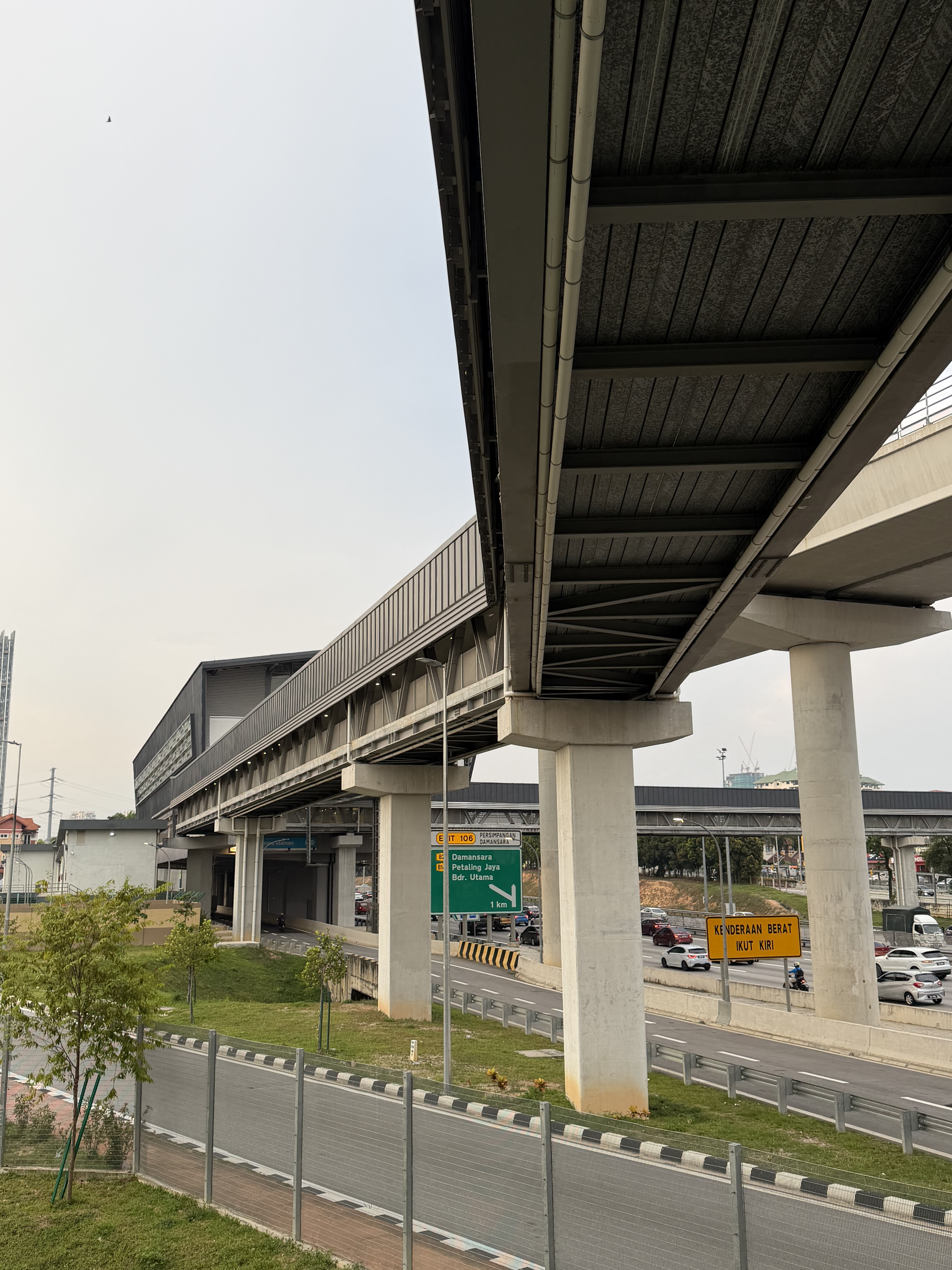
The station's view nearby the lift of Entrance A

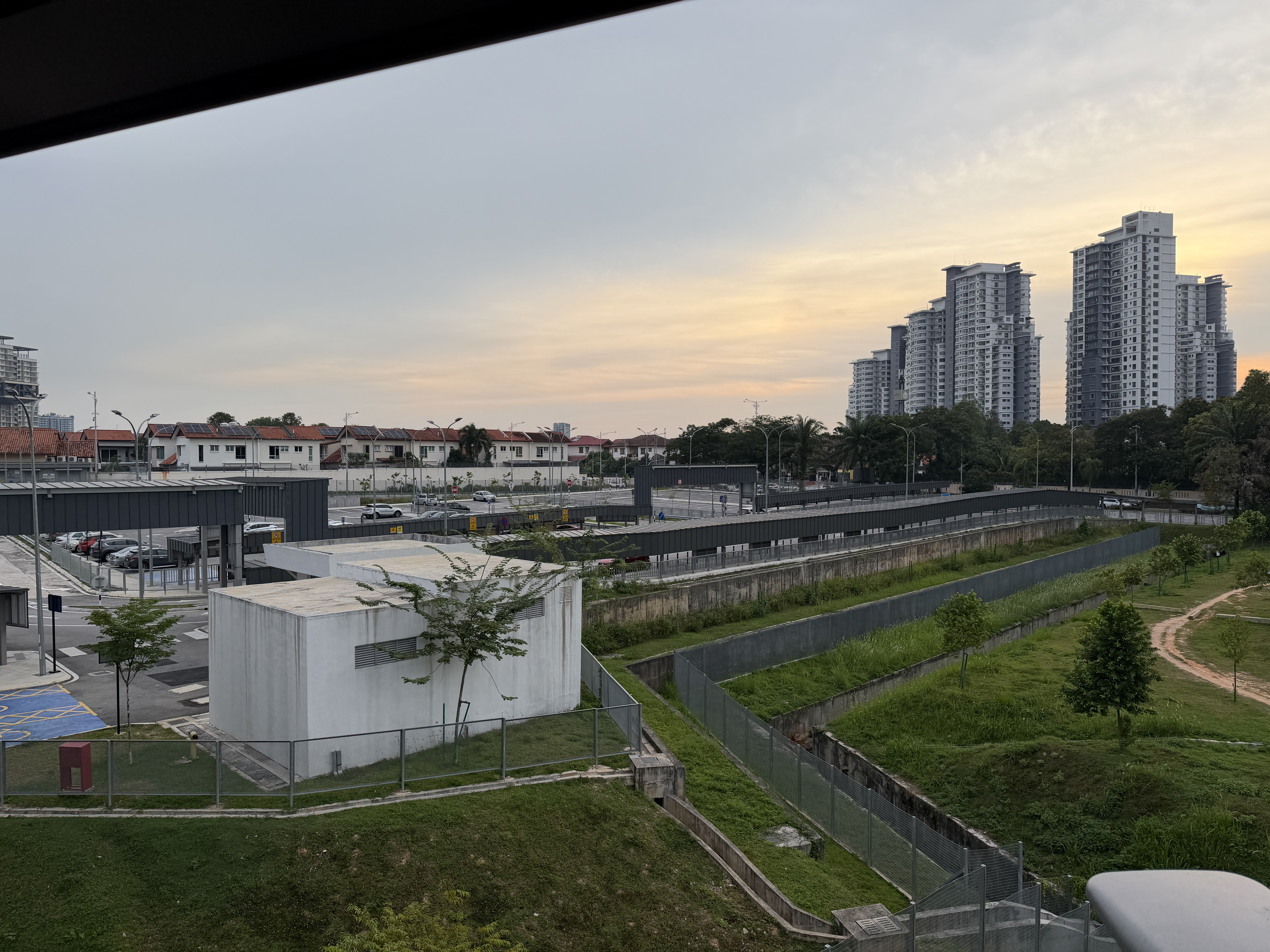
The station's Park N' Ride view from the Entrance A pedestrian walkway

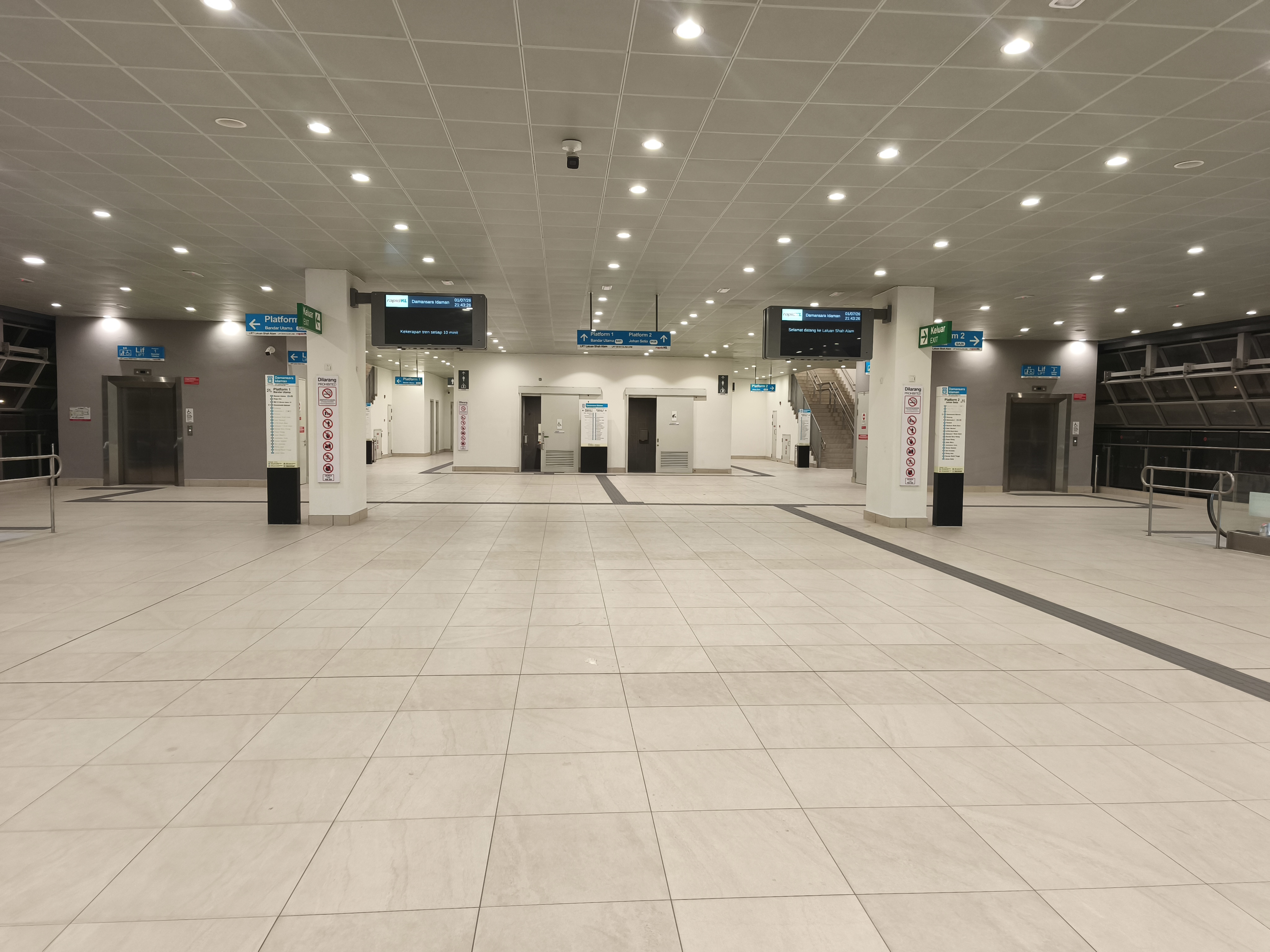
View of the station's concourse area

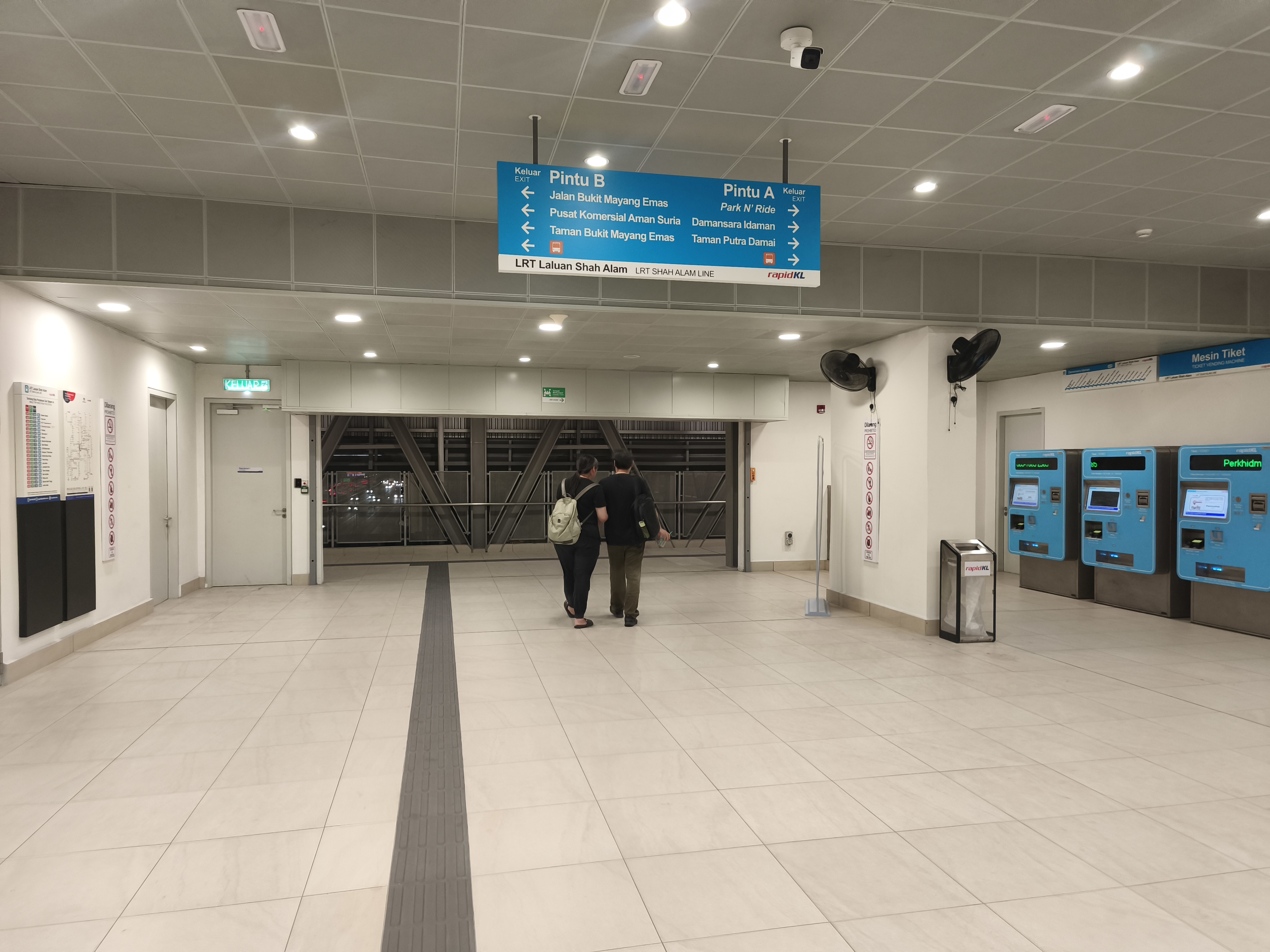
View of the station's concourse-to-exit, showing exit destinations on signboard
