= Subang LRT station =

Metro station in Malaysia

SA06 Subang
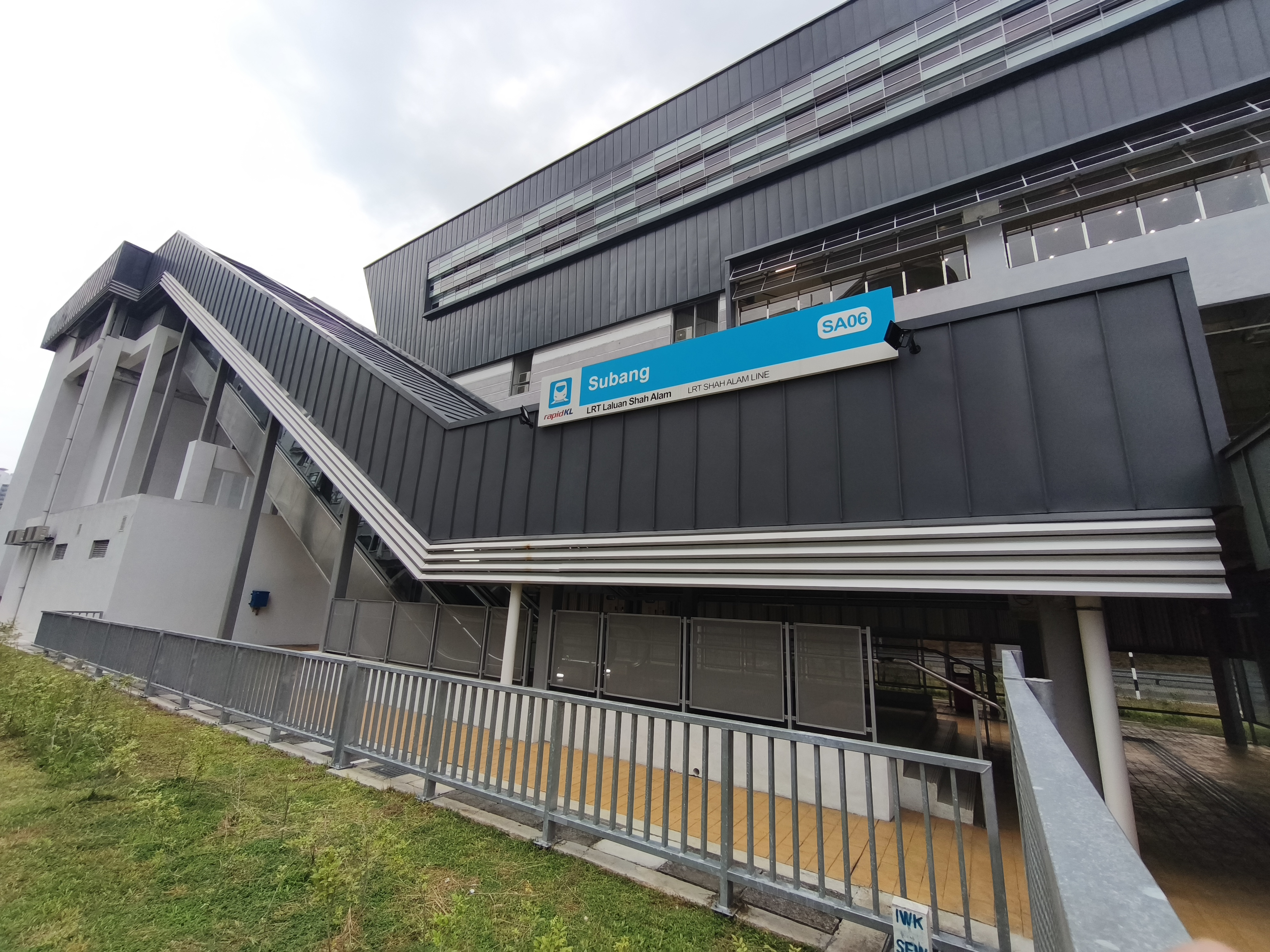
- Subang LRT Station in 2026

General information
- Other names: Malay: سوبڠ (Jawi); Chinese: 梳邦; Tamil: சுபாங்
- Location: Kelana Jaya, Selangor; Malaysia
- Coordinates: 3.1062°N 101.591°E
- System: Rapid KL
- Owner: Prasarana Malaysia
- Operator: Rapid Rail
- Line: 11 Shah Alam Line
- Platforms: 2 side platforms
- Tracks: 2

Construction
- Structure type: Elevated
- Parking: Not available
- Accessible: Yes

Other information
- Station code: SA06

History
- Opened: 29 June 2026; 3 months ago
- Former names: SS 7

Services
Preceding station		Following station
Damansara Idaman towards Bandar Utama	Shah Alam Line	Glenmarie 2 towards Johan Setia
Location

The Subang LRT station, is a light rapid transit (LRT) station that serves the suburb of Kelana Jaya in the city of Petaling Jaya, Selangor, Malaysia. It serves as one of the stations on the Shah Alam line, the station is an elevated rapid transit station, forming part of the Klang Valley Integrated Transit System. The station is situated in the SS7 township in Petaling Jaya opposite Persada PLUS, the headquarters of the PLUS Expressways and Subang Toll Plaza of the New Klang Valley Expressway (NKVE).

== History ==
This is the sixth station along the RM9 billion line project, with the line's maintenance depot located in Johan Setia, Klang. Originally, this station during the construction phase was named SS7 until April 2026 when the station was currently renamed to Subang. It has facilities such as kiosks, restrooms, elevators, a taxi stand and feeder bus. It currently only has one entrance, namely Entrance A that connects to Kelana Square and the SS7 township of Kelana Jaya.

== Surrounding Areas ==
- Kelana Square (the station is right behind this business complex)
- Paradigm Mall PJ
- Le Meridien Petaling Jaya Hotel (ex-New World)
- Kelana D'Putra Condominium
- The Arcuz Residences
- Zenith Residences and Corporate Park (less than 5 minutes walk)
- Pinnacle Kelana Jaya
- Kelana Mahkota Condominium
- Kelana Putri Condominium
- Laguna Residences
- Sterling Condominium
- Tiara Kelana Condominium
- Taman Mayang, Kelana Jaya
- Innovative Universtiy Collage

== Feeder Bus ==
Route No.	Origin	Destination	Via	Connecting to	Map
T781	KJ24 Kelana Jaya	Kelana Centre Point / Stadium MBPJ; SA06 Subang	Damansara–Puchong Expressway; Jalan SS 7/26; Jalan SS 7/19; KJ27 SA07 Glenmarie; Jalan SS 7/2; Jalan SS 7/15; Jalan SS 7/13	783, T780	

== Gallery ==
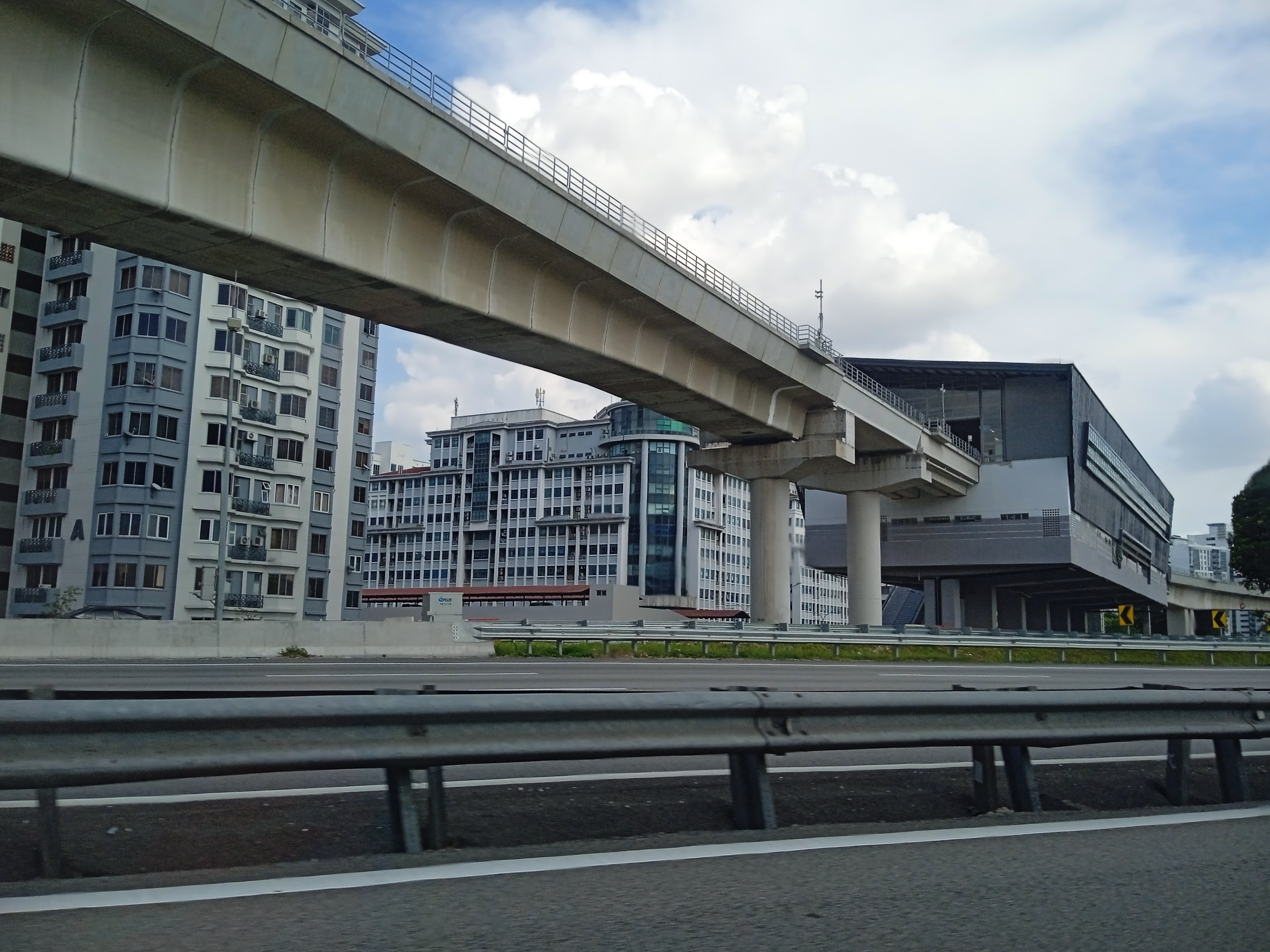
Outview of the station from the northern side of NKVE in 2025

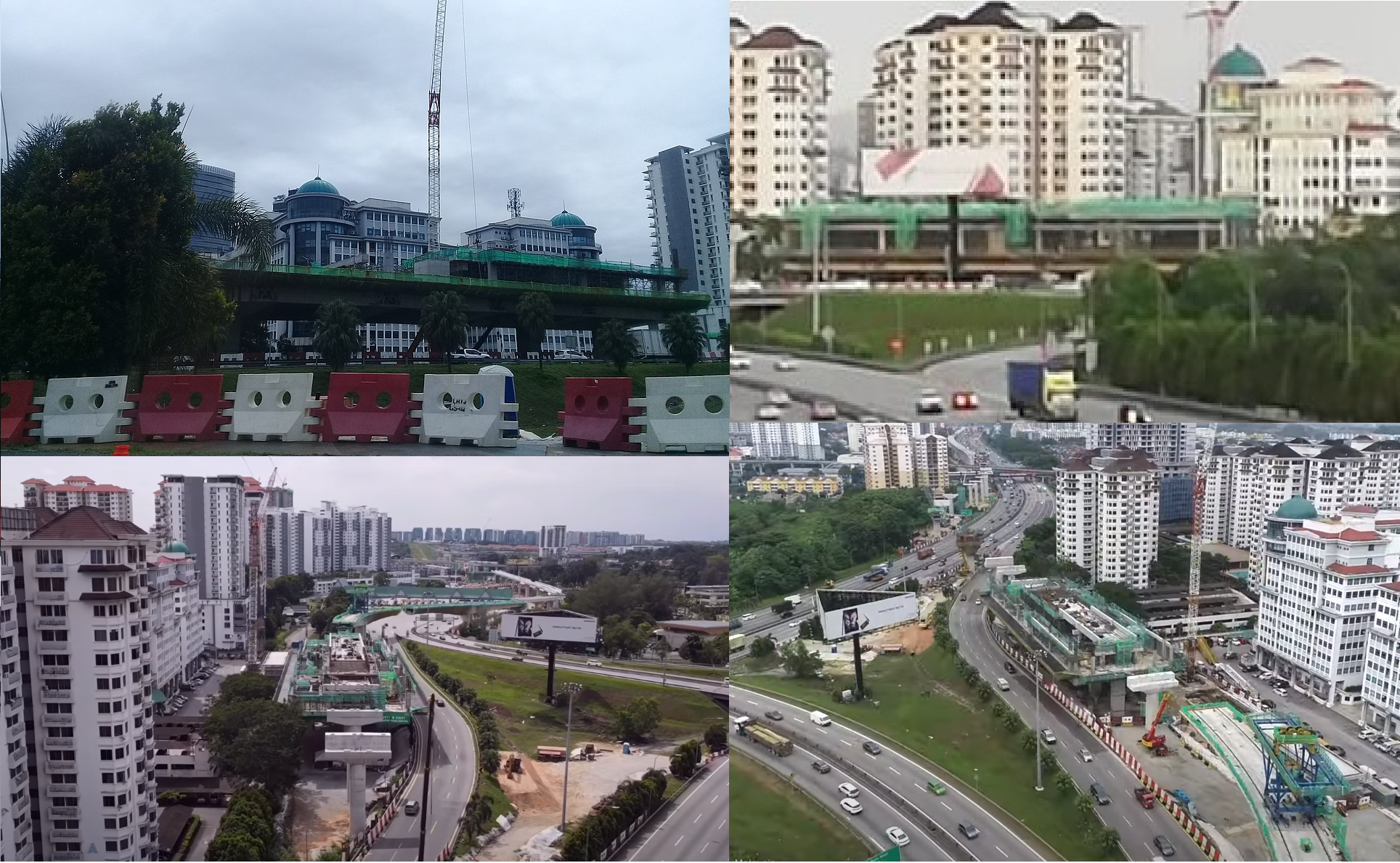
Compiled views of the station under construction in 2022

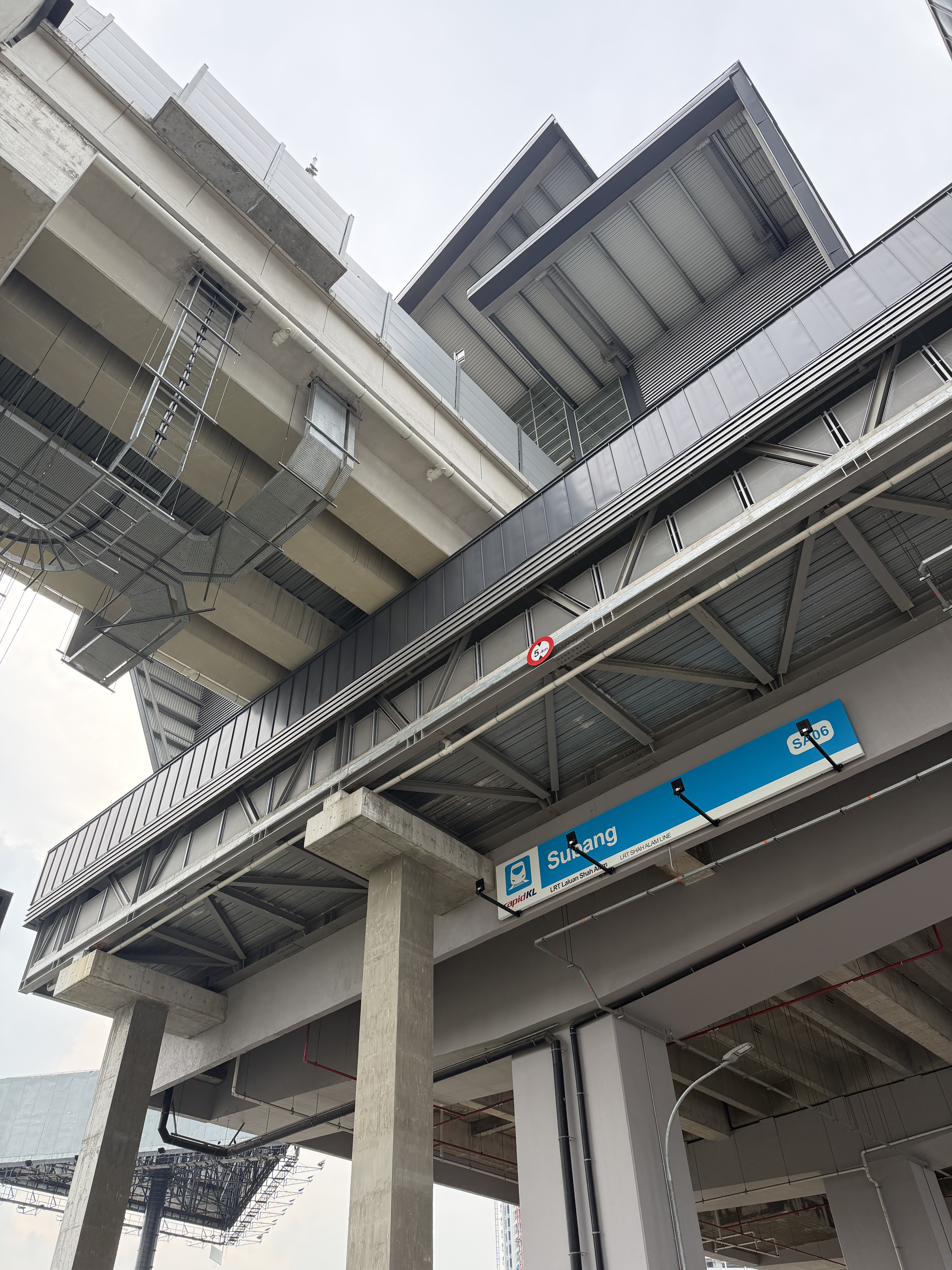
A low-angle perspective view of the station next to the NKVE

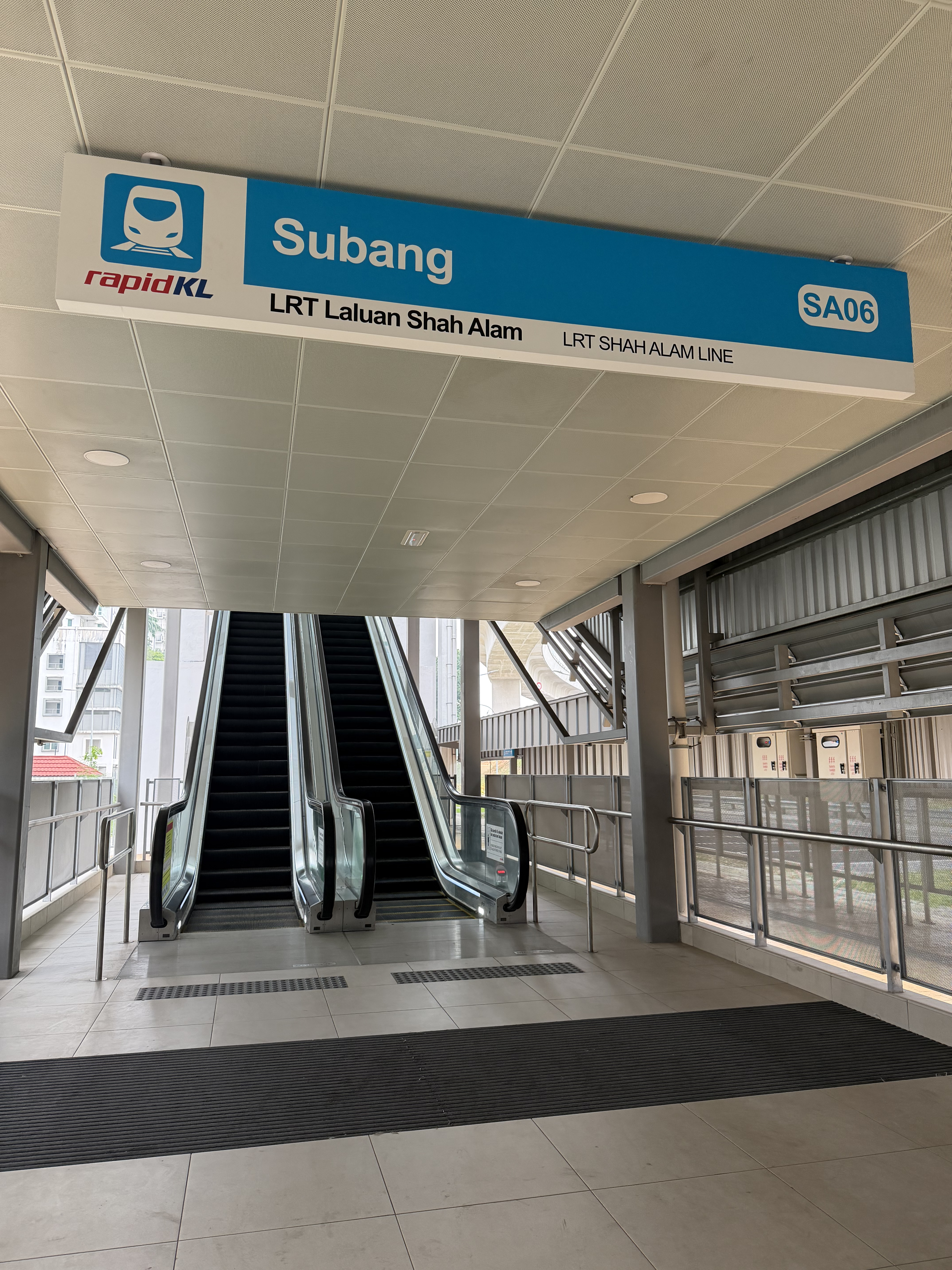
View of the station's only entrance, on the ground floor nearby Kelana Square
