= Titiwangsa (disambiguation) =

Titiwangsa may refer to:

- Titiwangsa
- Titiwangsa (federal constituency), represented in the Dewan Rakyat
- Titiwangsa Lake Park, a park in Kuala Lumpur, Malaysia
- Titiwangsa Mountains, a mountain range in Peninsular Malaysia
- Titiwangsa station, a metro station in Kuala Lumpur, Malaysia
