= Hospital Kuala Lumpur MRT station =

Metro station in Kuala Lumpur, Malaysia

PY18 Hospital Kuala Lumpur
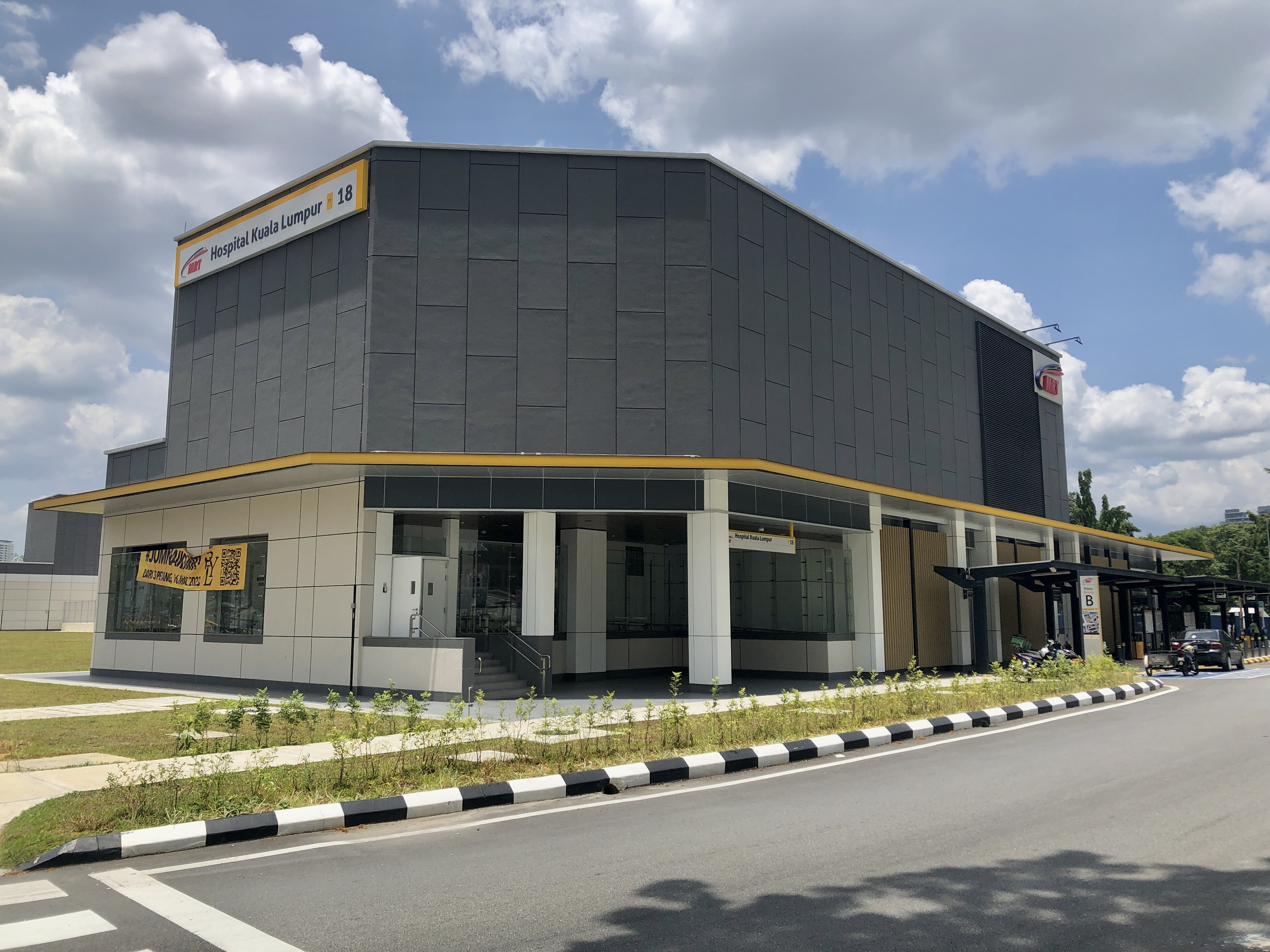

General information
- Other names: Malay: هوسڤيتل كوالا لمڤور (Jawi); Chinese: 吉隆坡中央医院; Tamil: கோலாலம்பூர் மருத்துவமனை
- Location: Jalan Tun Razak, Titiwangsa; 53200 Kuala Lumpur; Malaysia
- Coordinates: 3°10′27.17″N 101°42′5.95″E
- System: Rapid KL
- Owner: MRT Corp
- Operator: Rapid Rail
- Line: 12 Putrajaya Line
- Platforms: 1 island platform
- Tracks: 2

Construction
- Structure type: Underground
- Depth: 28.9 metres (95 ft)
- Parking: Available
- Accessible: Yes

Other information
- Status: Operational
- Station code: PY18

History
- Opened: 16 March 2023; 3 years ago

Services
Preceding station		Following station
Titiwangsa towards Kwasa Damansara	Putrajaya Line	Raja Uda towards Putrajaya Sentral
Location

The Hospital Kuala Lumpur MRT station is a mass rapid transit (MRT) underground station located along Jalan Tun Razak (formerly known as Jalan Pekeliling) in downtown Kuala Lumpur, Malaysia. It is one of the stations on the Putrajaya Line.

The station began operations on 16 March 2023 as part of Phase Two operations of the Putrajaya Line.

== Station details ==
=== Location ===
The station is located along Jalan Tun Razak, next to its intersection with Jalan Pahang. The station is named after and primarily serves the Kuala Lumpur Hospital, Malaysia's main public hospital, located across Jalan Tun Razak from the station.

The Titiwangsa Lake Park, Istana Budaya, and the National Visual Arts Gallery are located near the station.

=== Exits and entrances ===
This station has 2 entrances and 1 proposed entrance. Entrance A is located within the Kuala Lumpur Hospital grounds, while Entrance B is located next to Istana Budaya and the famous Titiwangsa Lake Park.

Putrajaya Line station
Entrance	Location	Destination	Picture
A	Jalan Utama Hospital	Kuala Lumpur Hospital (HKL), Department of Rehabilitation Medicine, Faculty of Dentistry UKM, Tunku Azizah Hospital, Vue Residences	
B	Jalan Kuantan	Taxi and E-hailing Layby, Jalan Tun Razak, Government Quarters, National Autism Society Of Malaysia, Istana Budaya, National Visual Arts Gallery, National Blood Centre, Titiwangsa Lake Park	
C Deferred	Jalan Maran	Government Quarters, Asrama SMK Seri Titiwangsa, SK Jalan Kuantan (1)	

== Feeder buses ==
- Rapid KL Bus 402 from Maluri station to Titiwangsa station passes by this station.

== Gallery ==
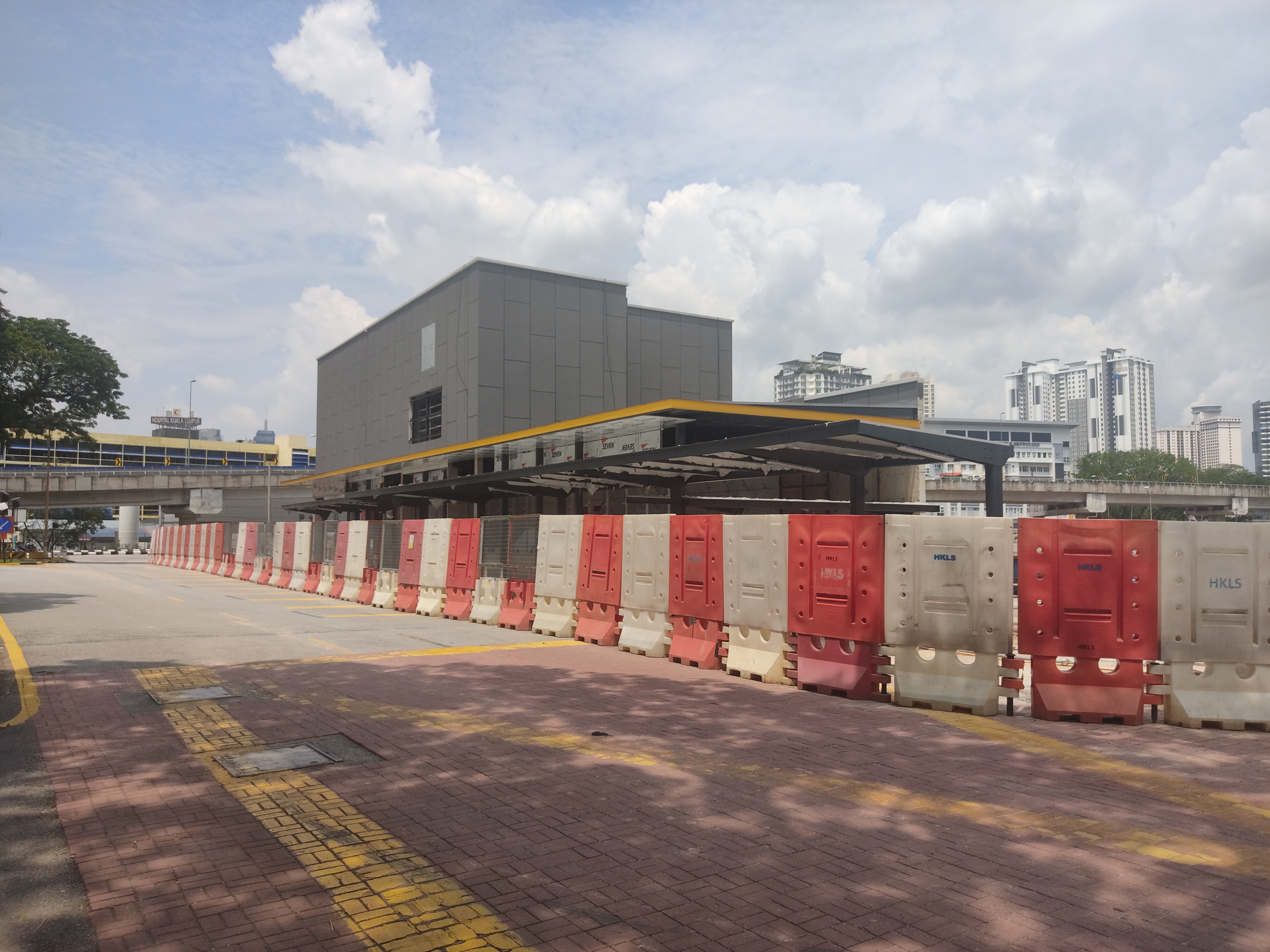

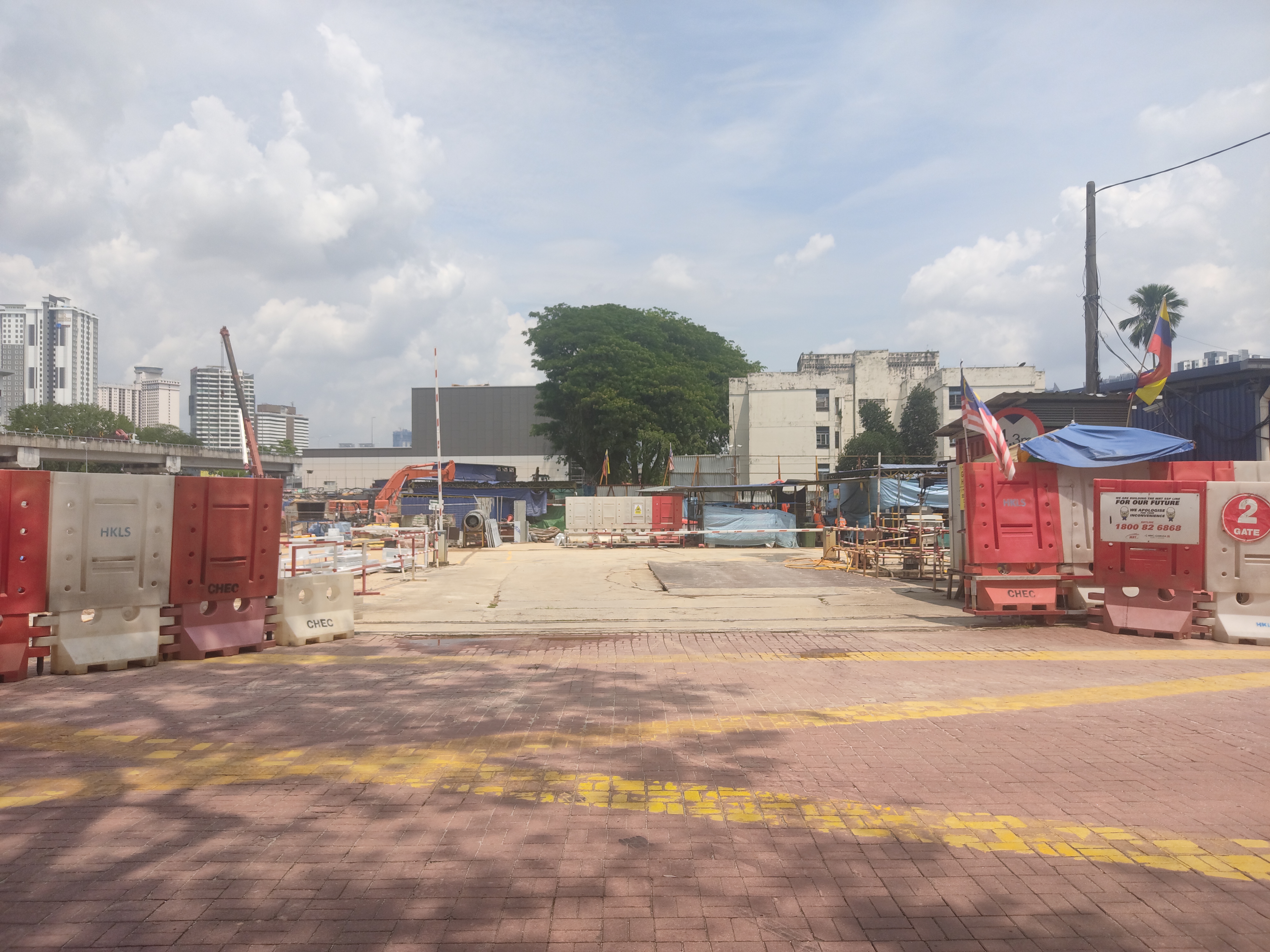
