= Titiwangsa =

- Suburb
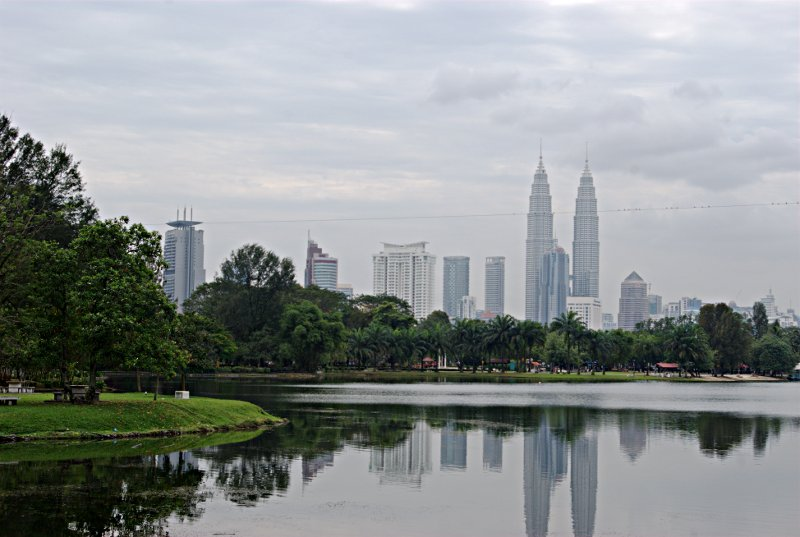
- Looking southeast across Lake Titiwangsa towards the Petronas Towers
- Interactive map of Titiwangsa
- Coordinates: 3.178°N 101.707°E
- Country: Malaysia
- State: Federal Territory of Kuala Lumpur
- Constituency: Setiawangsa

Government
  - Local Authority: Dewan Bandaraya Kuala Lumpur
  - Mayor: Mhd Amin Nordin Abdul Aziz
  - Titiwangsa Member of Parliament: Johari Abdul Ghani (UMNO)
- Time zone: UTC+8 (MST)
- Dialling code: +603-2, +603-4
- Police: Titiwangsa

Titiwangsa is one of the main areas located on the outskirts of Kuala Lumpur, Malaysia. The Kuala Lumpur General Hospital is located south of Titiwangsa. The current member of parliament for Titiwangsa is Johari Abdul Ghani from Barisan Nasional-UMNO.

The Titiwangsa Lake Gardens has facilitated cycling and water ball activities. The Eye on Malaysia, a large observation wheel, was located here in 2007 - 2008 before being transferred to Malacca where it was dismantled in 2010.

== Tourist attractions ==
- Titiwangsa Lake Gardens
- Istana Budaya
- Titiwangsa Stadium
- National Library of Malaysia
- Kampong Bharu

== Transportation ==
Titiwangsa can be accessed through the Titiwangsa LRT, MRT and Monorail station. The Hospital Kuala Lumpur MRT station also provides direct accessibility to the Titiwangsa Lake Gardens.

== Gallery ==
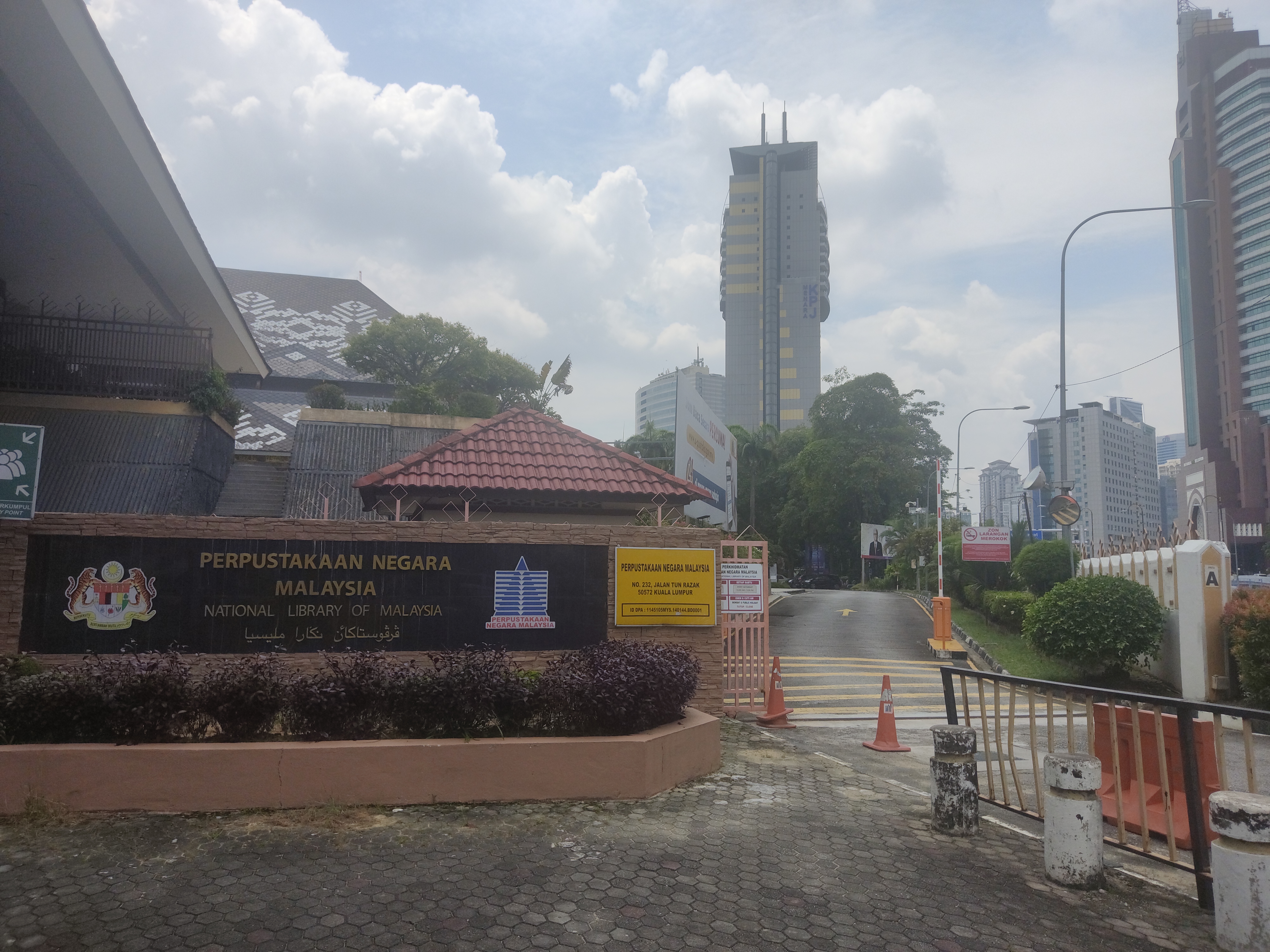
National Library of Malaysia

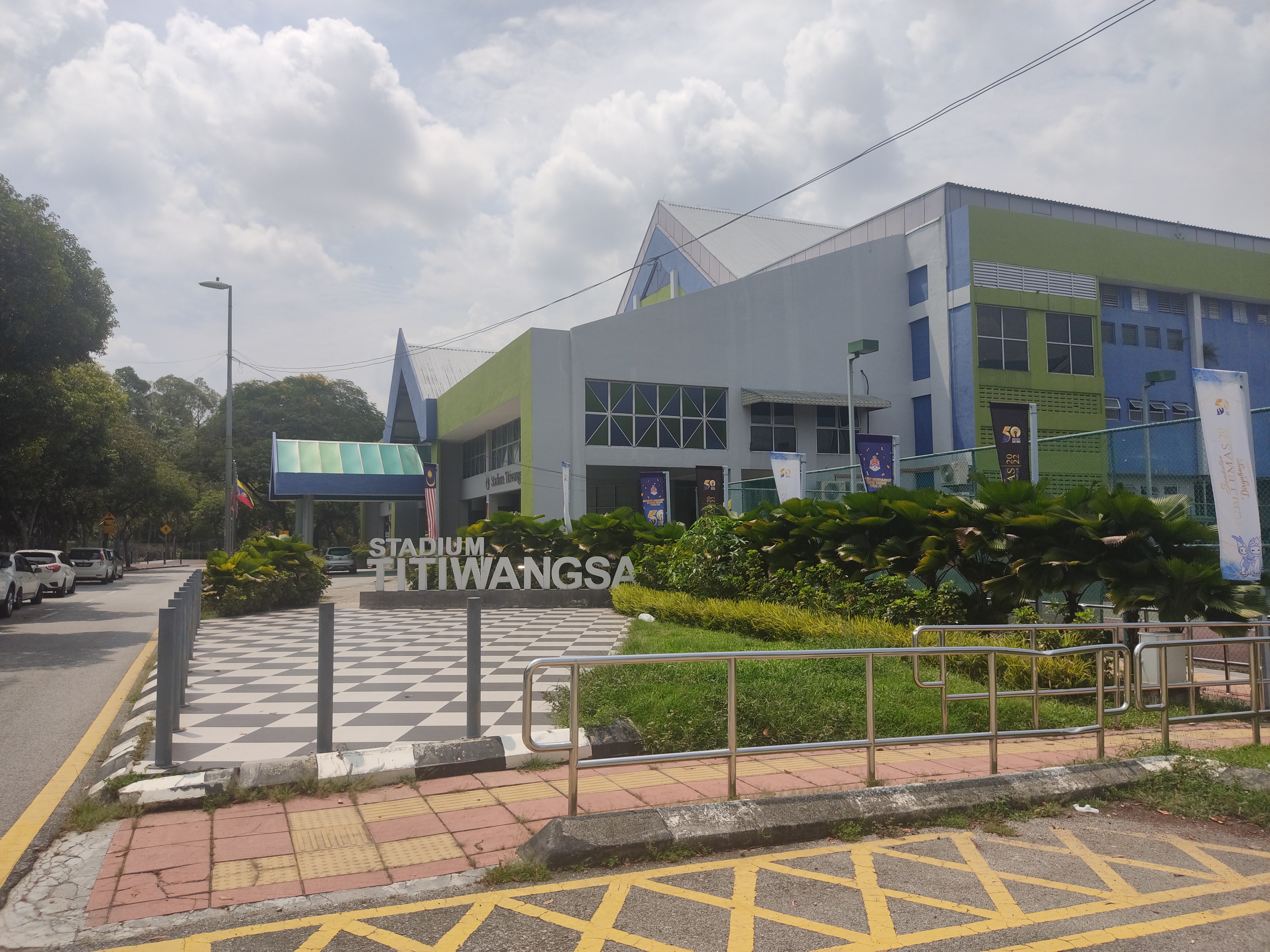
Titiwangsa Stadium

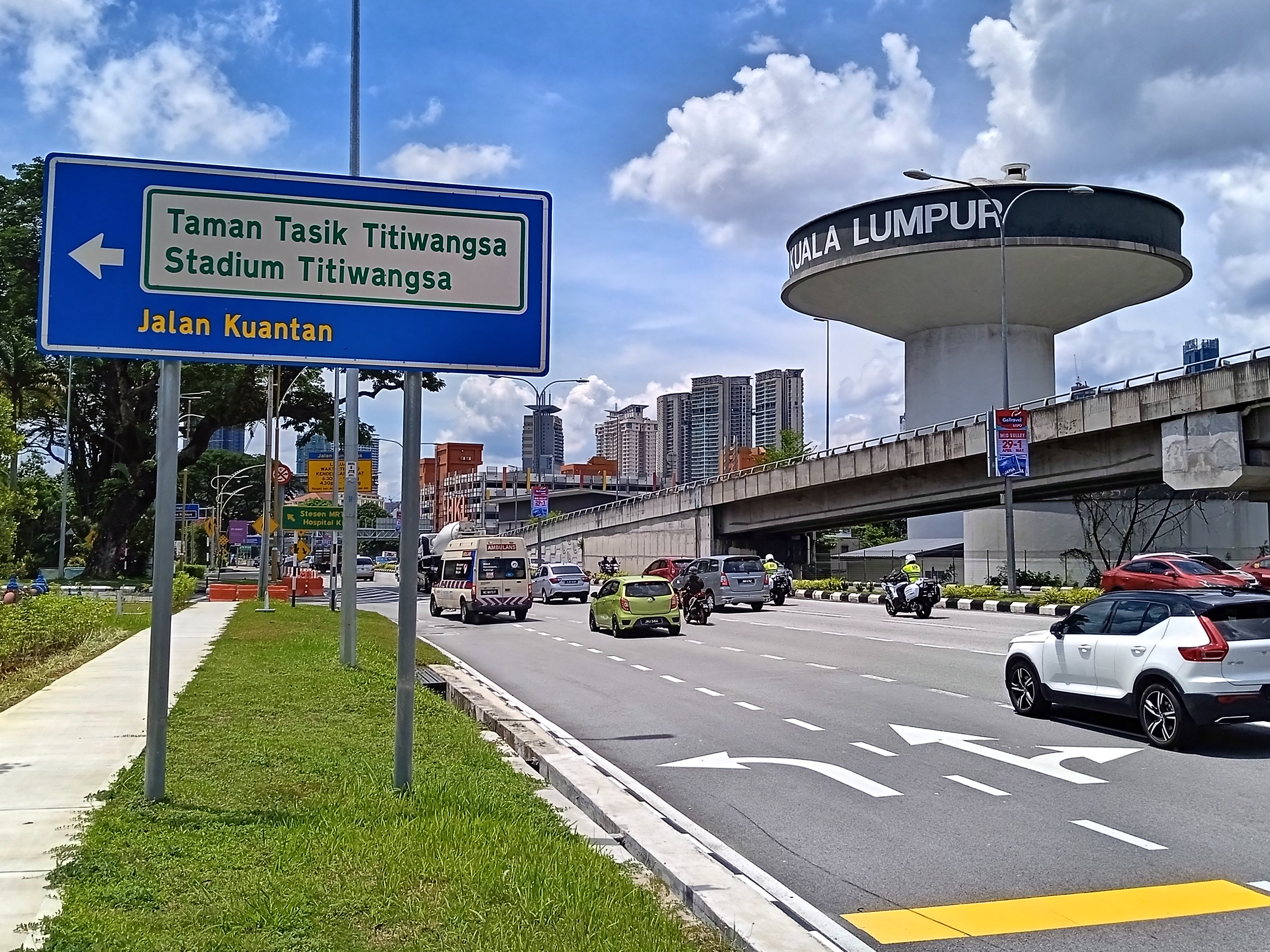
Jalan Tun Razak, Titiwangsa

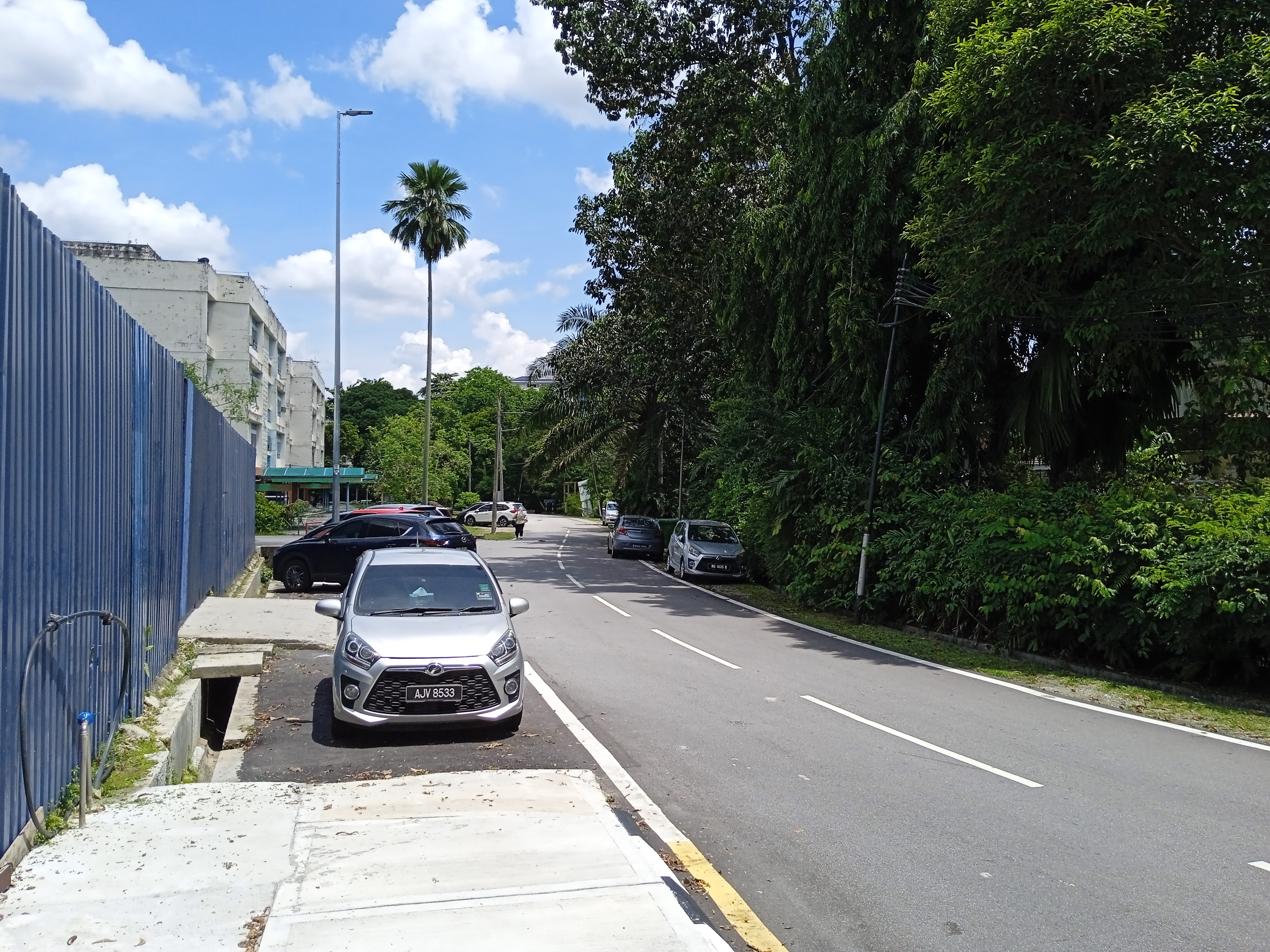
Jalan Maran, Titiwangsa

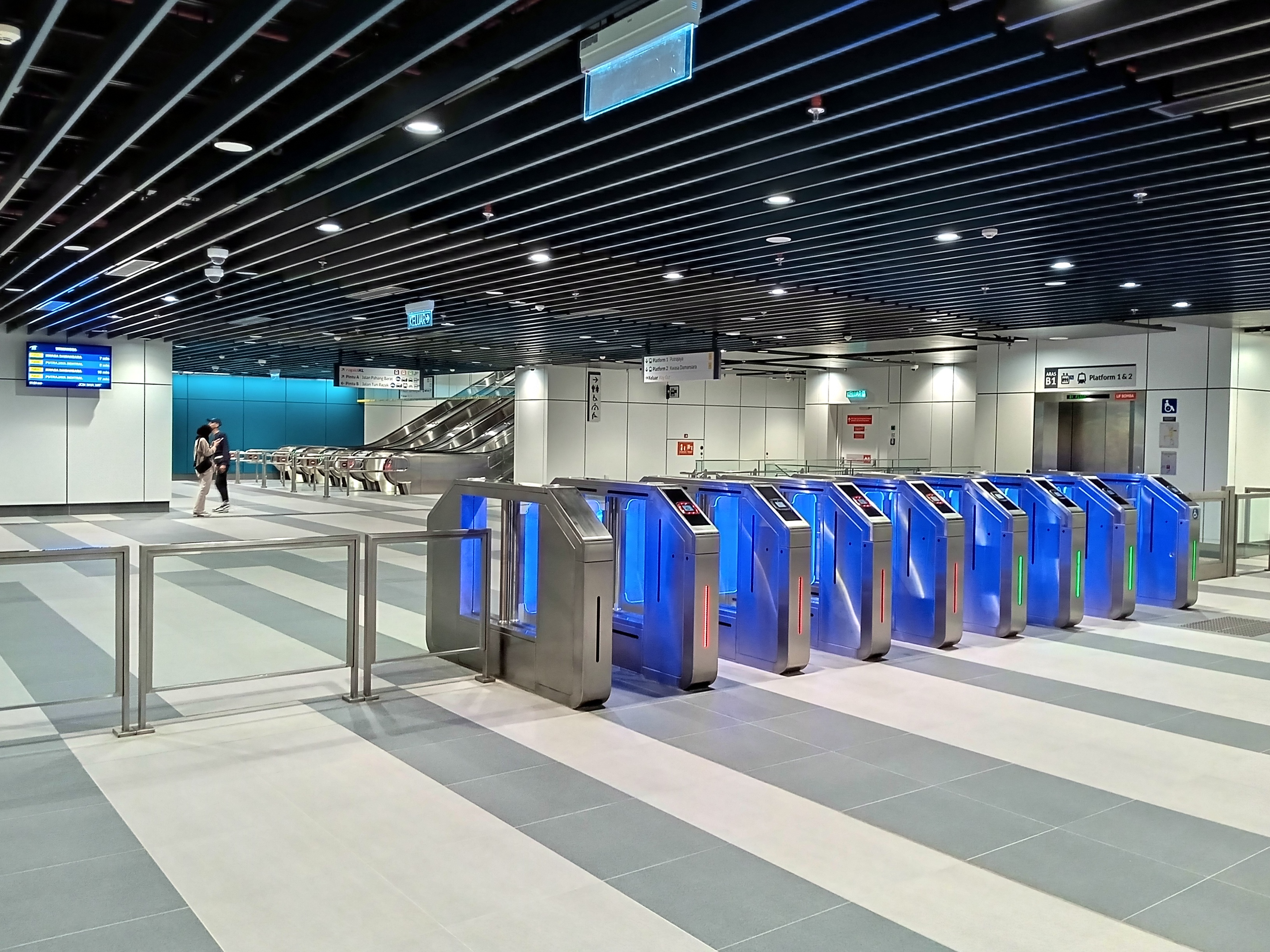
Titiwangsa MRT Station

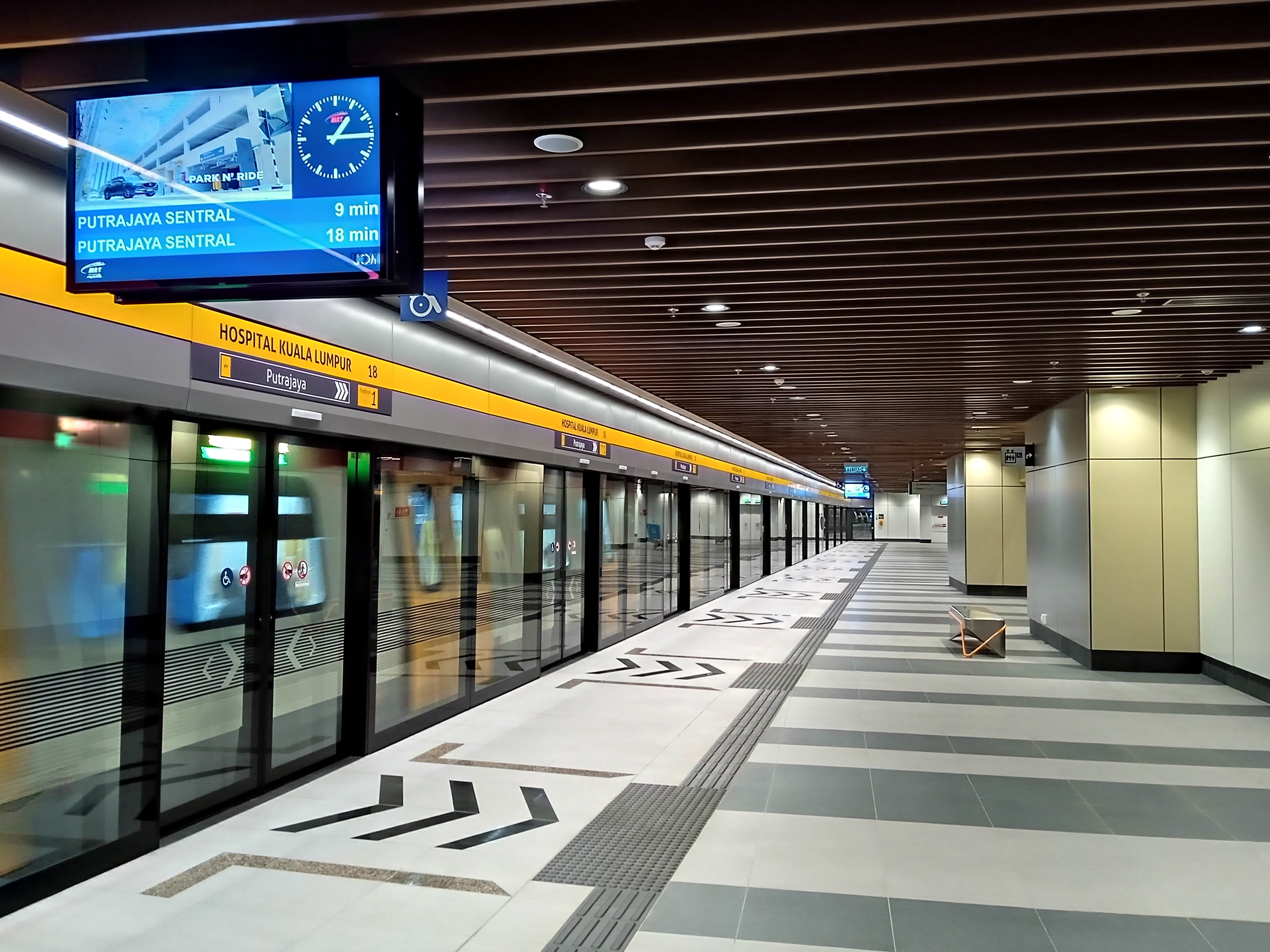
Hospital Kuala Lumpur MRT Station

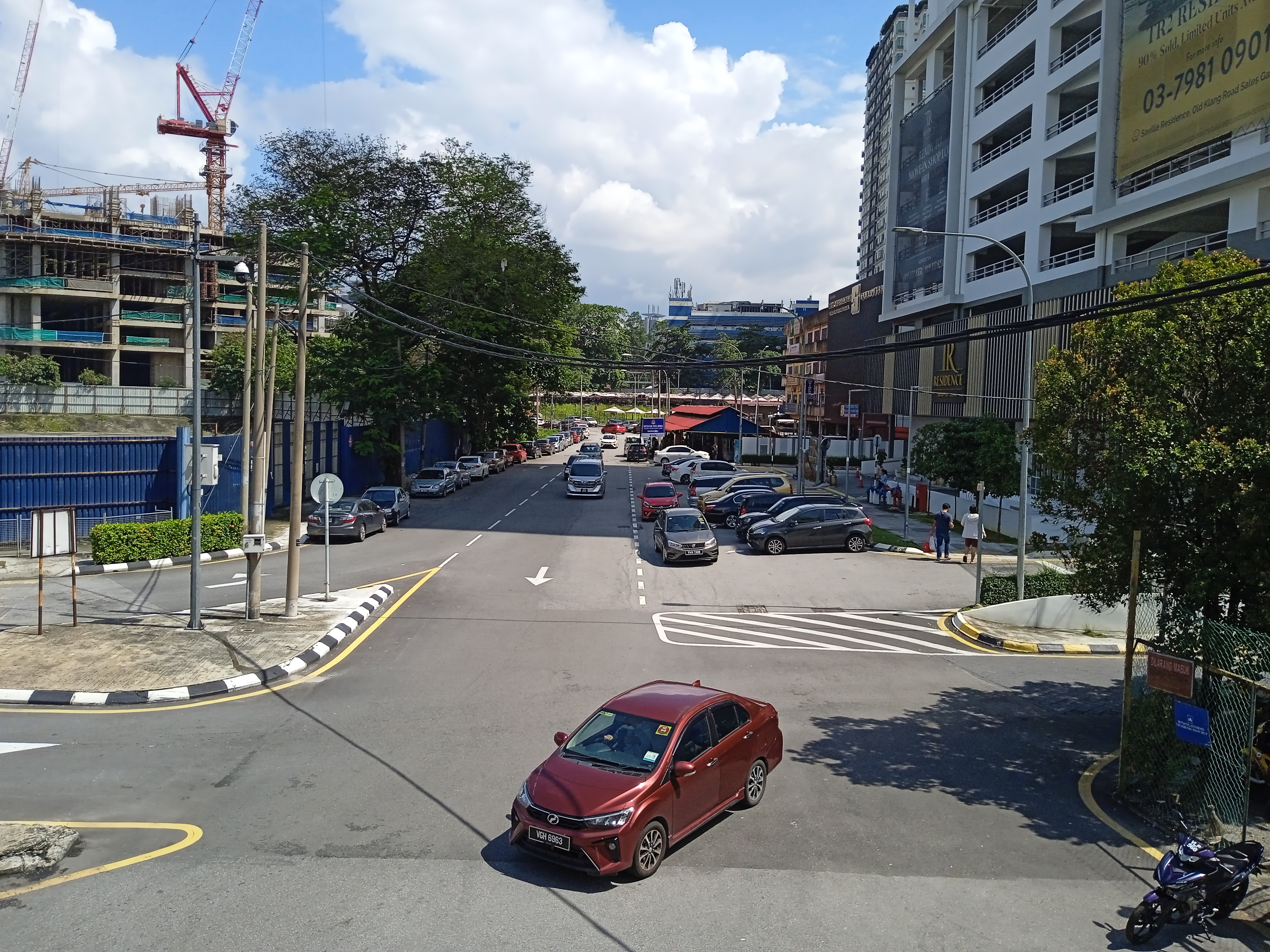
Jalan Pekeliling Lama
