= Titiwangsa station =

LRT, MRT and monorail interchange in Kuala Lumpur, Malaysia

AG3 SP3 MR11 PY17 CC09 Titiwangsa
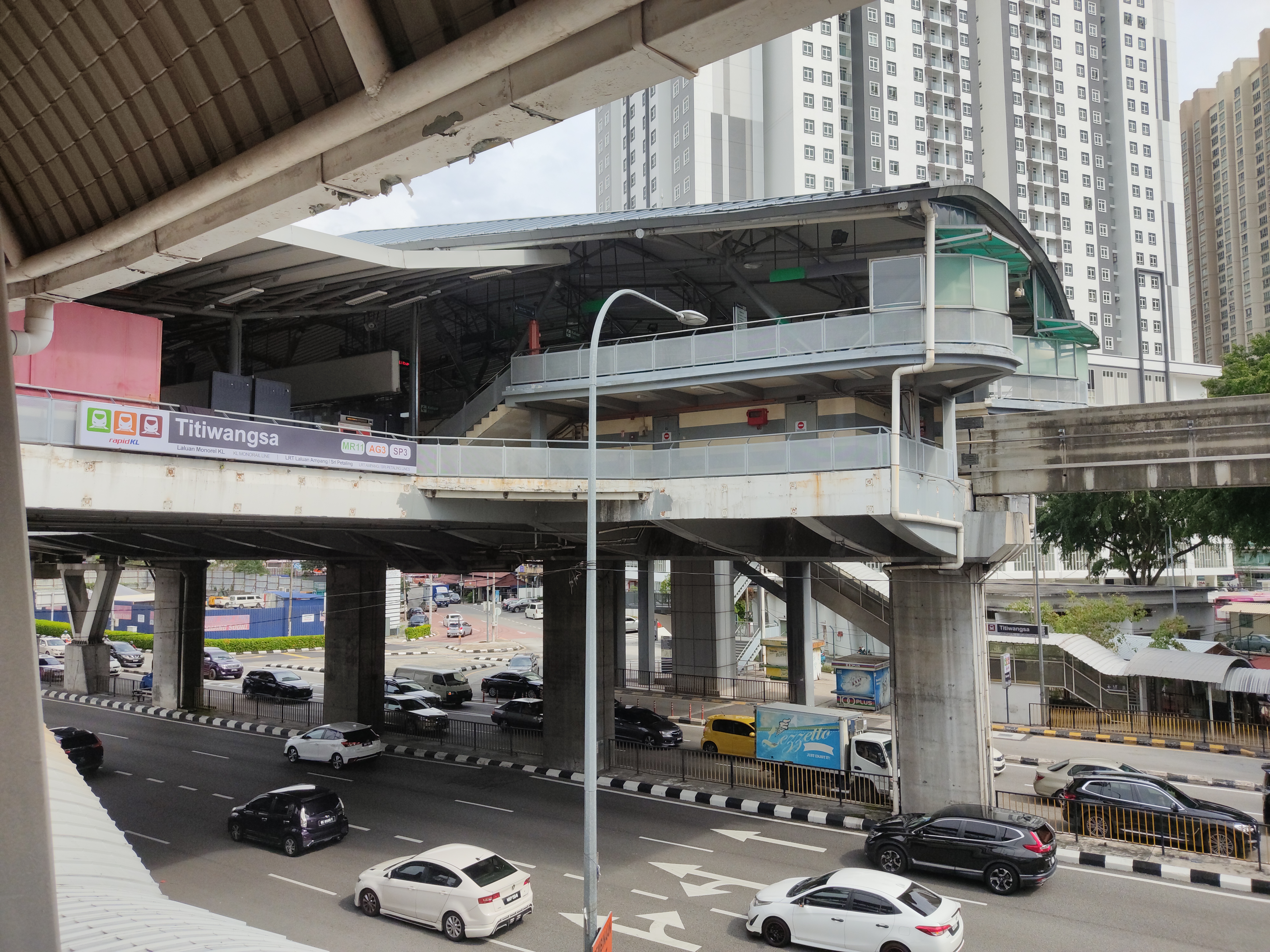
- The exterior of the Titiwangsa monorail station

General information
- Other names: Malay: تيتيوڠسا (Jawi); Chinese: 蒂蒂旺沙; Tamil: தித்திவங்சா
- Location: Jalan Tun Razak, Titiwangsa; 53000 Kuala Lumpur; Malaysia
- Coordinates: 3°10′23″N 101°41′43″E
- System: Rapid KL
- Owner: Prasarana Malaysia (LRT, Monorail); MRT Corp (MRT)
- Operator: Rapid Rail
- Lines: 3 Ampang Line; 4 Sri Petaling Line; 8 KL Monorail; 12 Putrajaya Line; 13 Circle Line (Future)
- Platforms: 2 side platforms (LRT); 2 side platforms (Spanish solution) (Monorail); 1 island platform (MRT)
- Tracks: 2 (LRT); 1 (Monorail); 2 (MRT)

Construction
- Structure type: AG3 SP3 MR11 CC09 Elevated; PY17 Underground
- Depth: 27 metres (89 ft)
- Platform levels: 3
- Parking: Not available
- Cycle facilities: Not available
- Accessible: Available

Other information
- Station code: AG3 SP3 MR11 PY17 CC09

History
- Opened: 6 December 1998; 27 years ago (LRT); 31 August 2003; 23 years ago (Monorail); 16 March 2023; 3 years ago (Putrajaya Line)
- Opening: 2032; 6 years' time (Circle Line)
- Former names: Tun Razak

Services
Preceding station		Following station
Sentul towards Sentul Timur	Ampang Line	PWTC towards Ampang
Sentul towards Sentul Timur	Sri Petaling Line	PWTC towards Putra Heights
Chow Kit towards Kuala Lumpur Sentral	KL Monorail	Terminus
Sentul Barat towards Kwasa Damansara	Putrajaya Line	Hospital Kuala Lumpur towards Putrajaya Sentral
Kampung Puah Clockwise / outer	Circle Line Future service	Kompleks Duta Anticlockwise / inner
Location

The Titiwangsa station is a major rapid transit interchange station in Titiwangsa, Kuala Lumpur, Malaysia. The station is served by the Ampang and Sri Petaling lines, the KL Monorail Line and the Putrajaya Line. The station allows seamless physical and fare integration between the four train lines. It is currently the only quadruple-line interchange within the Rapid KL metro system.

Situated on Jalan Tun Razak (English: Tun Razak Road, formerly Circular Road) in the subdistrict of Titiwangsa, the station is also located beside the Gombak River and an adjoining bus hub known as Titiwangsa Sentral.

The station is planned to be an interchange with the MRT Circle Line of the KVMRT project.

== History ==
First opened in 1998 as part of the former STAR LRT line's second phase of development, the station was intended to connect Titiwangsa to other parts of the city and surrounding areas. Under Phase 2 of the STAR line, a 15 km track with 11 stations was built to serve the northern and southern areas of Kuala Lumpur to cater for the Commonwealth Village and the National Sports Complex in Bukit Jalil, during the 1998 Commonwealth Games in Kuala Lumpur. At that time, Titiwangsa station was named as "Tun Razak" station.

=== LRT station ===
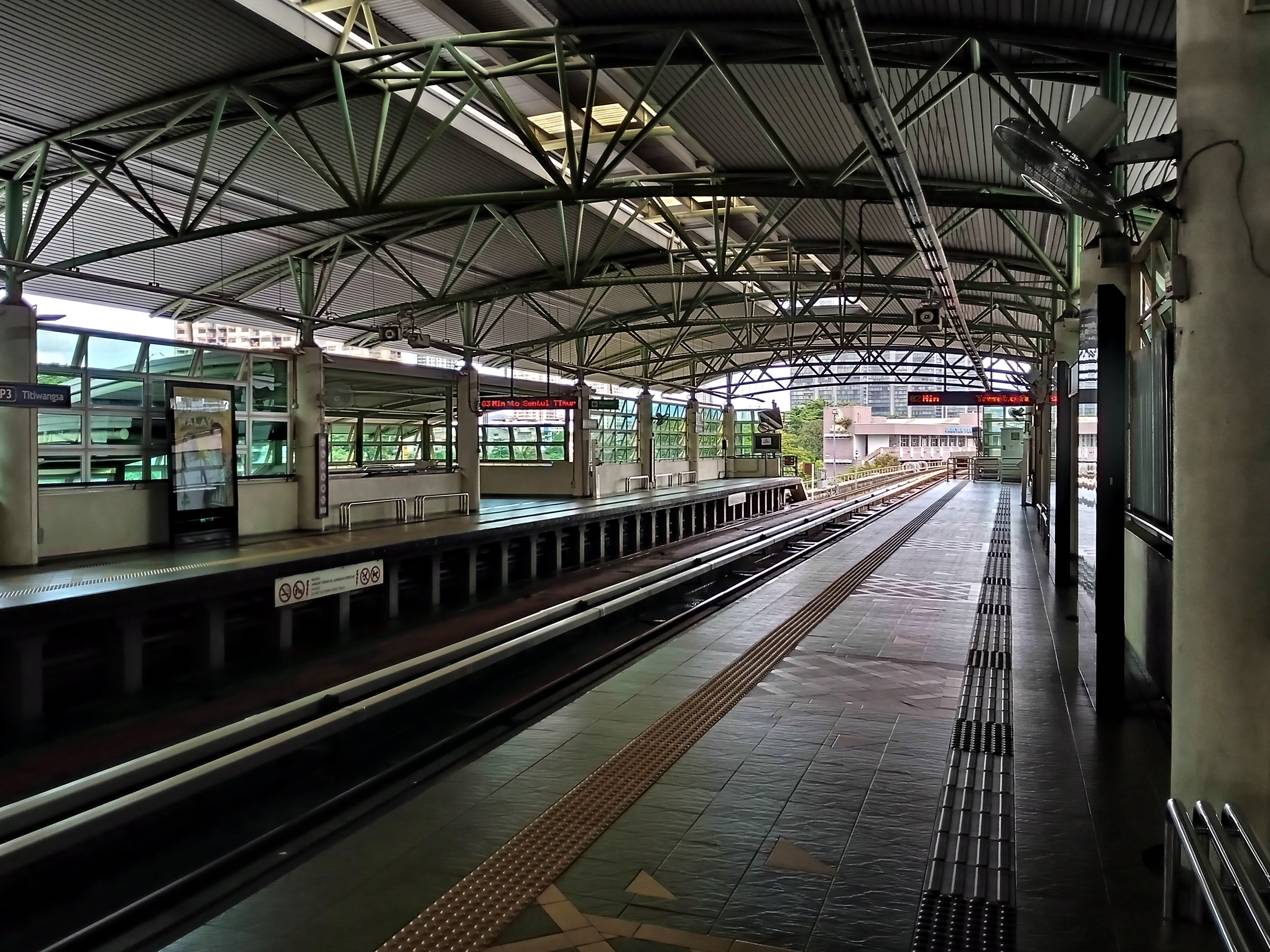
Platform level of Titiwangsa LRT station

The Titiwangsa LRT station is a light rapid transit (LRT) station along the common route of the Ampang line and Sri Petaling line for trains travelling south towards Ampang or Putra Heights, or north towards Sentul Timur. Opened in 1998 as part of the former STAR LRT line's second phase of development, the station was intended to connect Titiwangsa to other parts of the city and surrounding areas. The station, like all stations along the northern stretch of the LRT line, is elevated, with platforms located on the top floor and ticketing facilities located on the mid-level concourse.

=== Monorail station ===
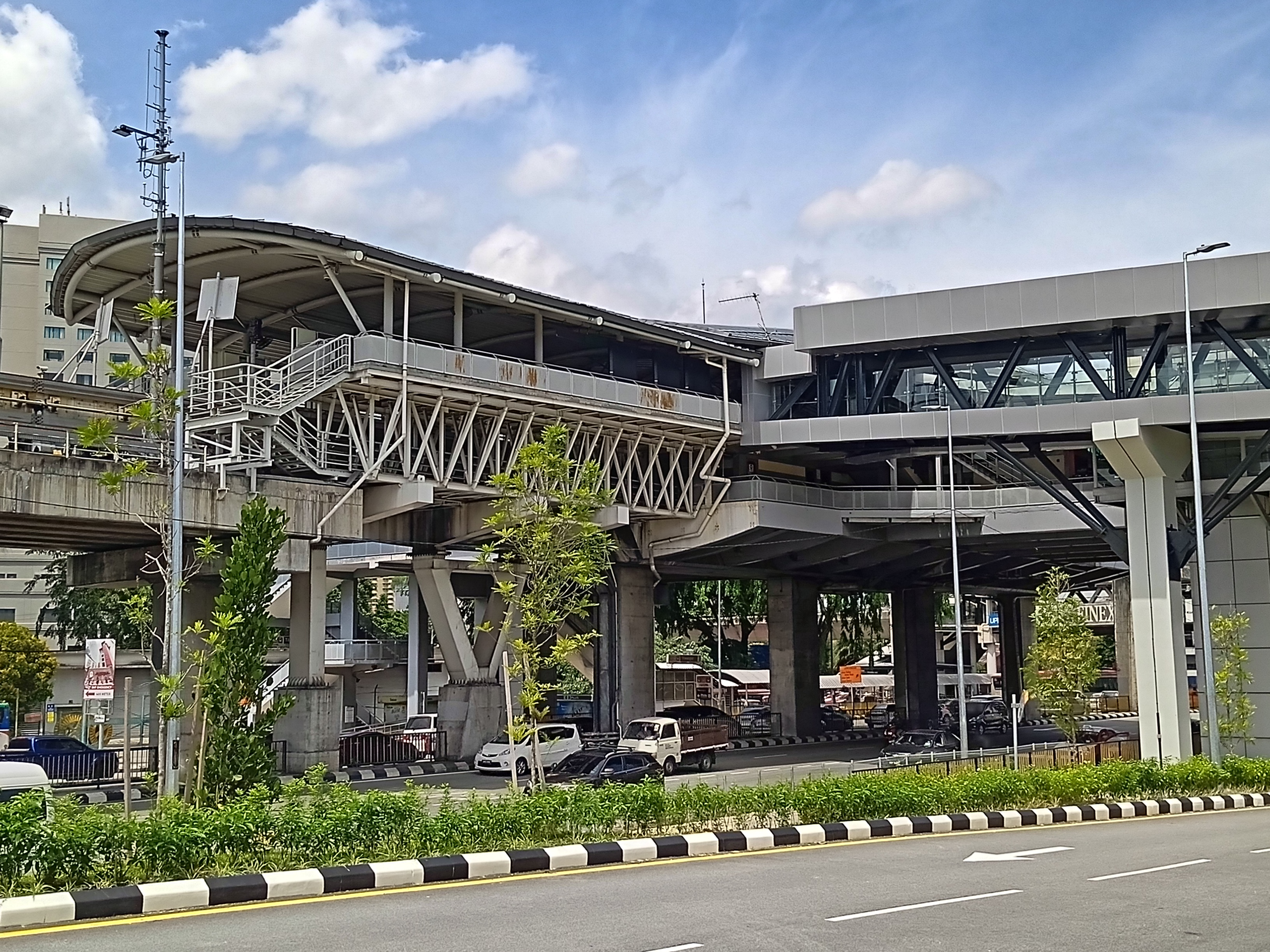
Exterior view of Titiwangsa monorail station

The Titiwangsa Monorail station is a later addition in the area that is intended to connect the LRT station with the KL Monorail line. The station was constructed over Jalan Tun Razak and was completed in 2003, serving as the northern terminus of KL Monorail, with a buffer stop directly after the station. Like the LRT station, the monorail station sports somewhat similar level designs. The station was constructed with a Spanish solution layout, similar to the KL Sentral Monorail station. The station is one of two KL Monorail stations that are designated as an interchange with the Ampang and Sri Petaling Lines, the other being Hang Tuah station.

=== MRT station ===
The underground Titiwangsa MRT station is the latest addition to the integrated station, served by the Putrajaya Line which opened on 16 March 2023. Titiwangsa is one of the Putrajaya Line's 3 interchanges with the Ampang and Sri Petaling Lines, the other two being Chan Sow Lin and Sungai Besi.

The station's theme encapsulates the essence of "rhythm", capturing a dynamic and harmonious arrangement characterized by regular, repetitive patterns of movement or sound, emphasizing elements such as pattern, flow and tempo. The selected color palette for the theme is "ocean blue", inspired by Titiwangsa, a district named after the Titiwangsa Lake Park, which was previously an area of tin mines.

The station was built under the demolished Pekeliling Flats, one of the first low cost high density high rise apartment made by the government. An elevated station has also been planned for the MRT Circle Line in the future, making it as the next metro hub in the city with 5 integrated transit lines.

=== Integrated LRT, MRT and Monorail station ===
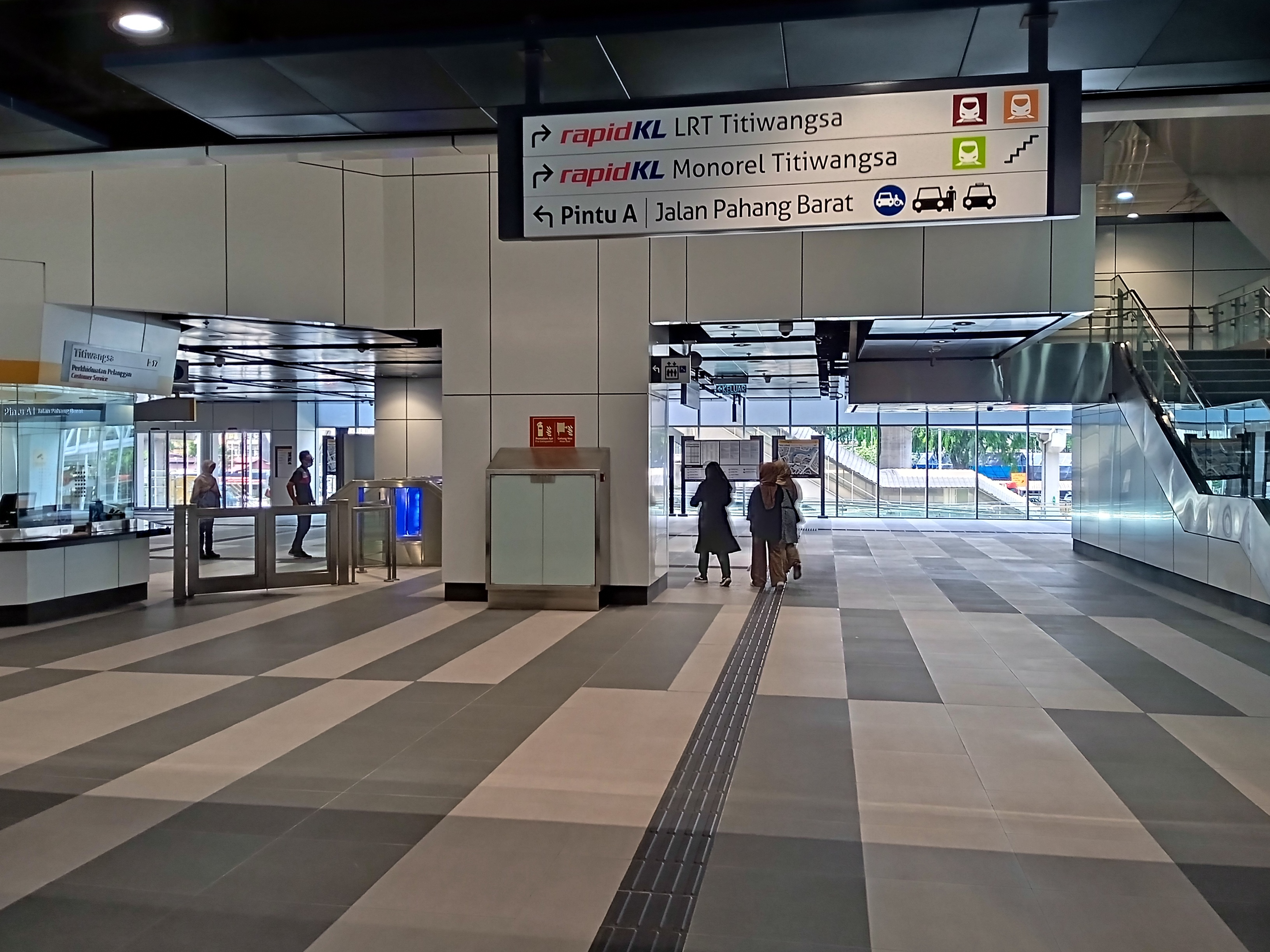
Intergrated paid-area of concourse of the station

Seamless transfer and fare integration was achieved on 1 March 2012 when the "paid-area" or restricted areas of both the LRT and monorail stations, which previously operated as two separate stations, were linked up with a footbridge, allowing passengers to transfer without needing to buy new tokens for the first time since the monorail became operational in 2003. This integration was later expanded to the MRT line, with link bridges from the LRT and monorail platforms being built directly to the MRT station plaza which houses escalators, lifts and stairs down to the underground MRT platforms.

== Bus hub ==
Titiwangsa Hub Hab Titiwangsa

General information
- Other names: Hab Pekeliling
- Location: Jalan Pekeliling, Selangor; Malaysia
- System: Intercharge bus hub
- Bus operators: Rapid Bus; Go KL City Bus; Central Pahang Omnibus; Bulan Restu Sdn. Bhd.; Temerloh Kuala Lumpur Express Omnibus; MARA Liner; Pahang Lin Siong; Trnas Malaya; Wawasan Sutera (Aerobus)
- Connections: AG3 SP3 MR11 PY17 CC09 Titiwangsa station
Location

The Titiwangsa station is located close to a bus hub, also known as the Pekeliling Bus hub, just north beside the Gombak River and simply consisting of several rows of shelters. The station serves multiple local bus services, primarily by Rapid Bus and Go KL City Bus. There are intercity bus services from here to main townships in West Pahang including Genting Highlands (Aerobus), Bentong (MARA Liner, Central Pahang ), Raub (MARA Liner, Central Pahang, Pahang Lin Siong), Kuala Lipis (Pahang Lin Siong), Cameron Highlands (Pahang Lin Siong), Jerantut (Trans Malaya), Temerloh (Temerloh) and Triang.

However the express bus services has been shut down in May 2026 following a directive from the Land Public Transport Agency, with all operations now moved to Gombak Integrated Terminal near Gombak LRT station.

No.	Terminus			Operator	Ref.
254	Ayer Panas	↺	Hab Titiwangsa	Rapid Bus	
270	Hab Titiwangsa	⇌	Awana Bus Terminal	Wawasan Sutera (Aerobus)	
302	Titiwangsa	↺	KLCC	Rapid Bus	
402	Terminal Maluri	⇌	Hab Titiwangsa	Rapid Bus	
GOKL 03	Hab Titiwangsa	↺	KL Sentral	Kuala Lumpur City Hall (Go KL City Bus)	
GOKL 04	Hab Titiwangsa	↺	Bukit Bintang	Kuala Lumpur City Hall (Go KL City Bus)	
GOKL 05	Hab Titiwangsa	↺	MINDEF	Kuala Lumpur City Hall (Go KL City Bus)	
508	Hab Titiwangsa	⇌	Terminal Ekspres Bas Raub	Central Pahang	

== Around the station ==
- Terminal Bas Pekeliling
- Plaza Pekeliling

== Gallery ==
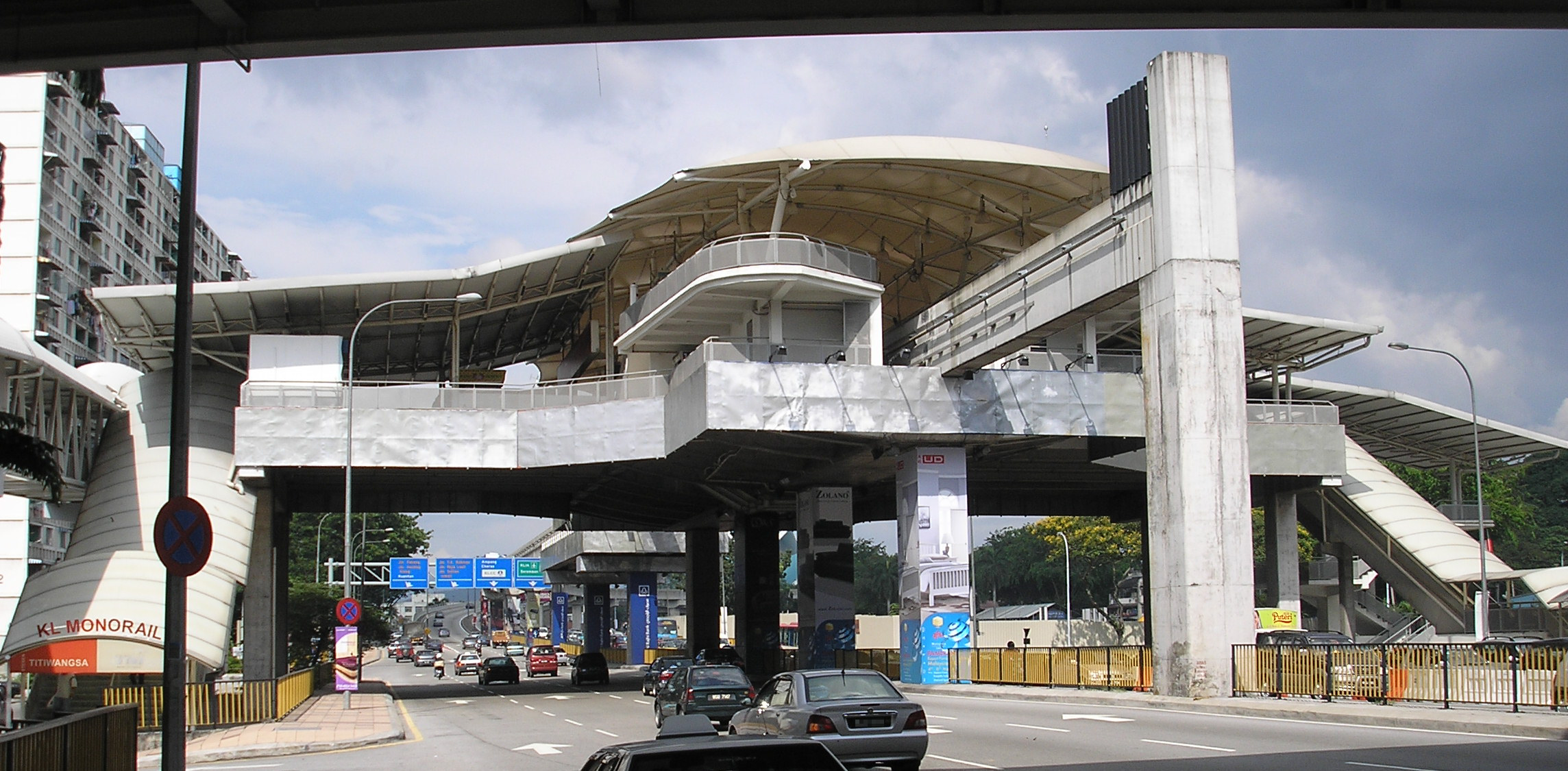
The exterior of the KL Monorail's terminal station, with the terminating line's buffer stop, 2007

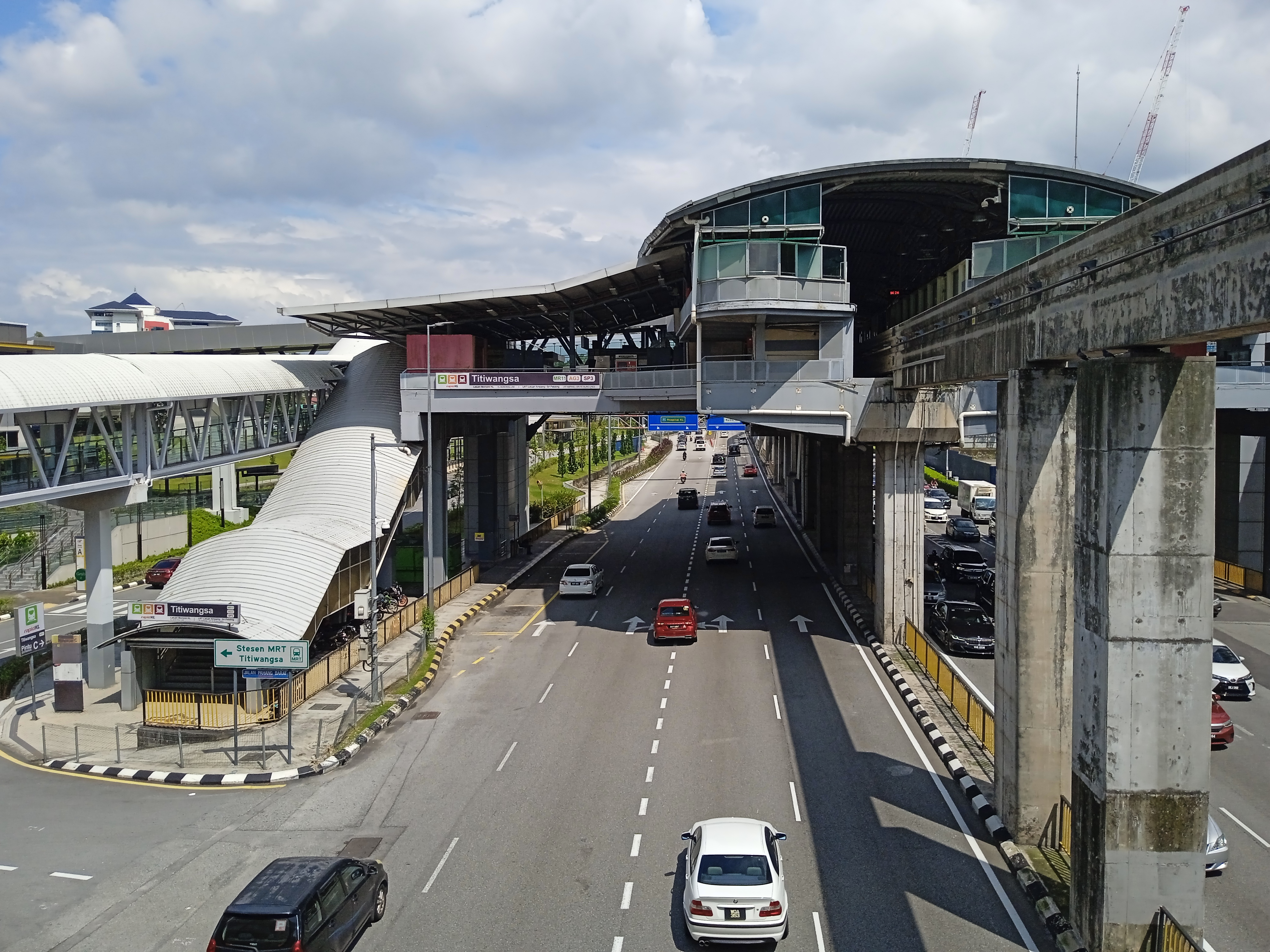
The KL Monorail station view from Jalan Tun Razak, 2023

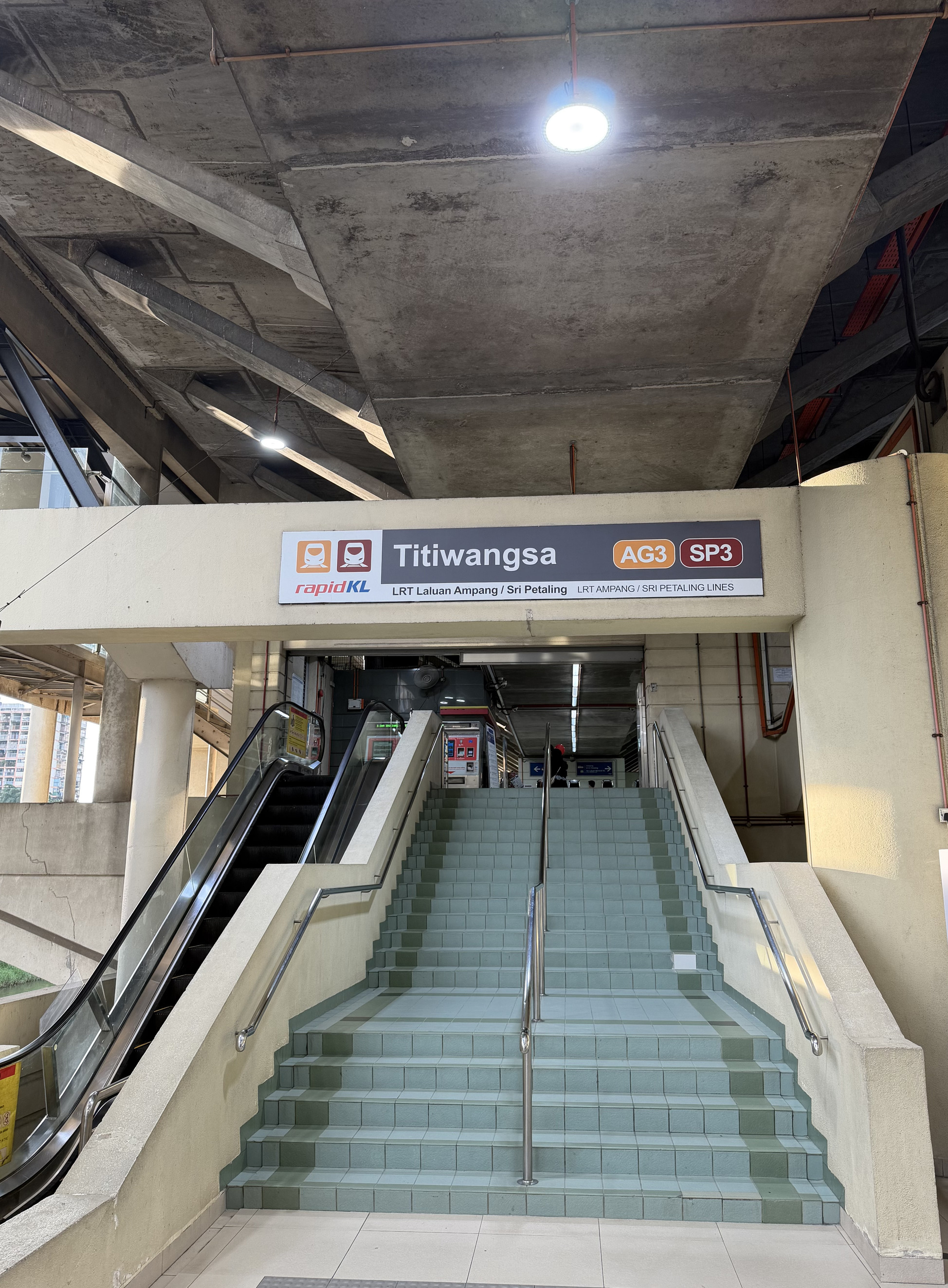
The entrance of the LRT portion of the station from Jalan Tun Razak, 2026

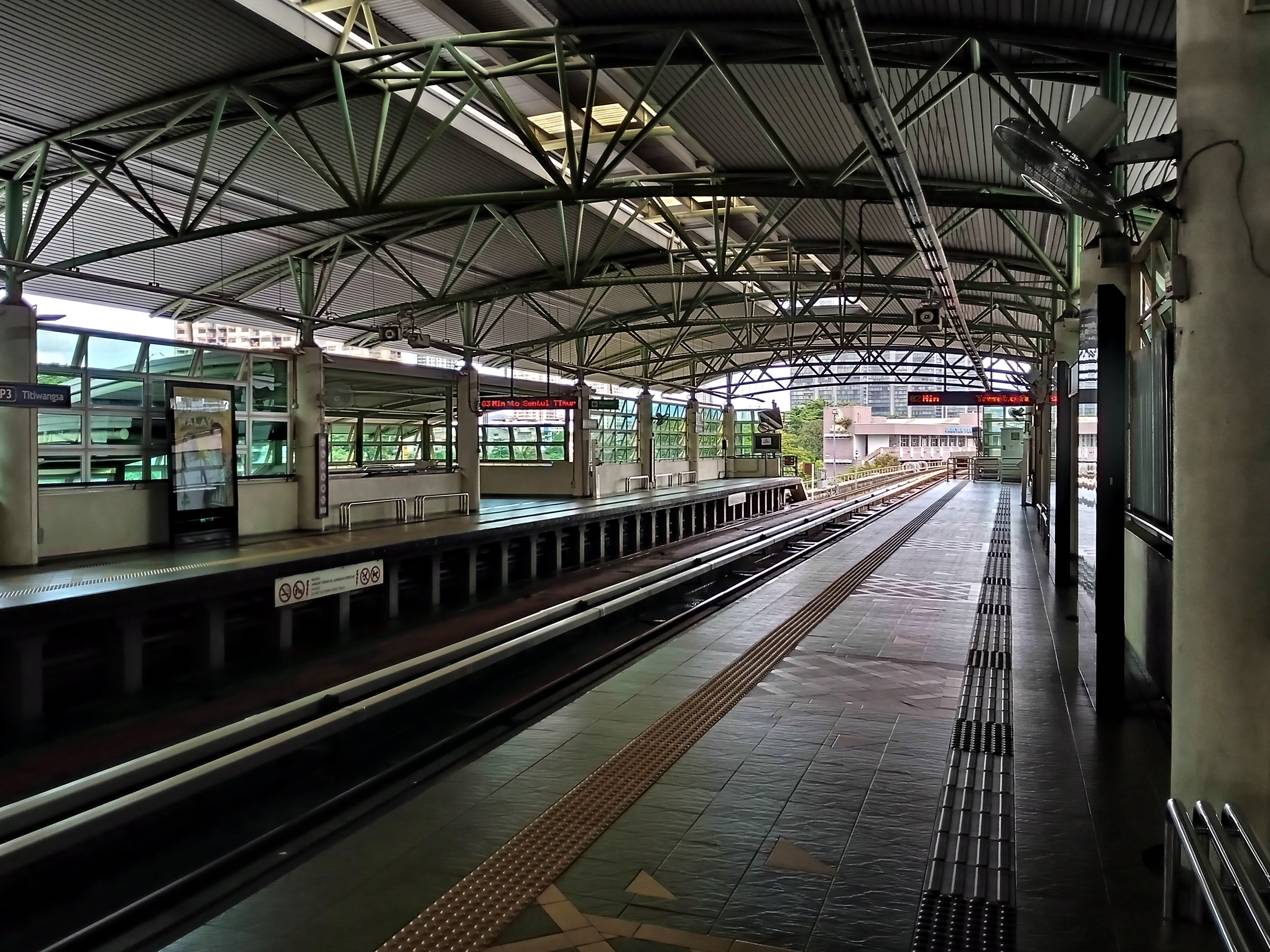
The platform level of the LRT portion of the station, 2022

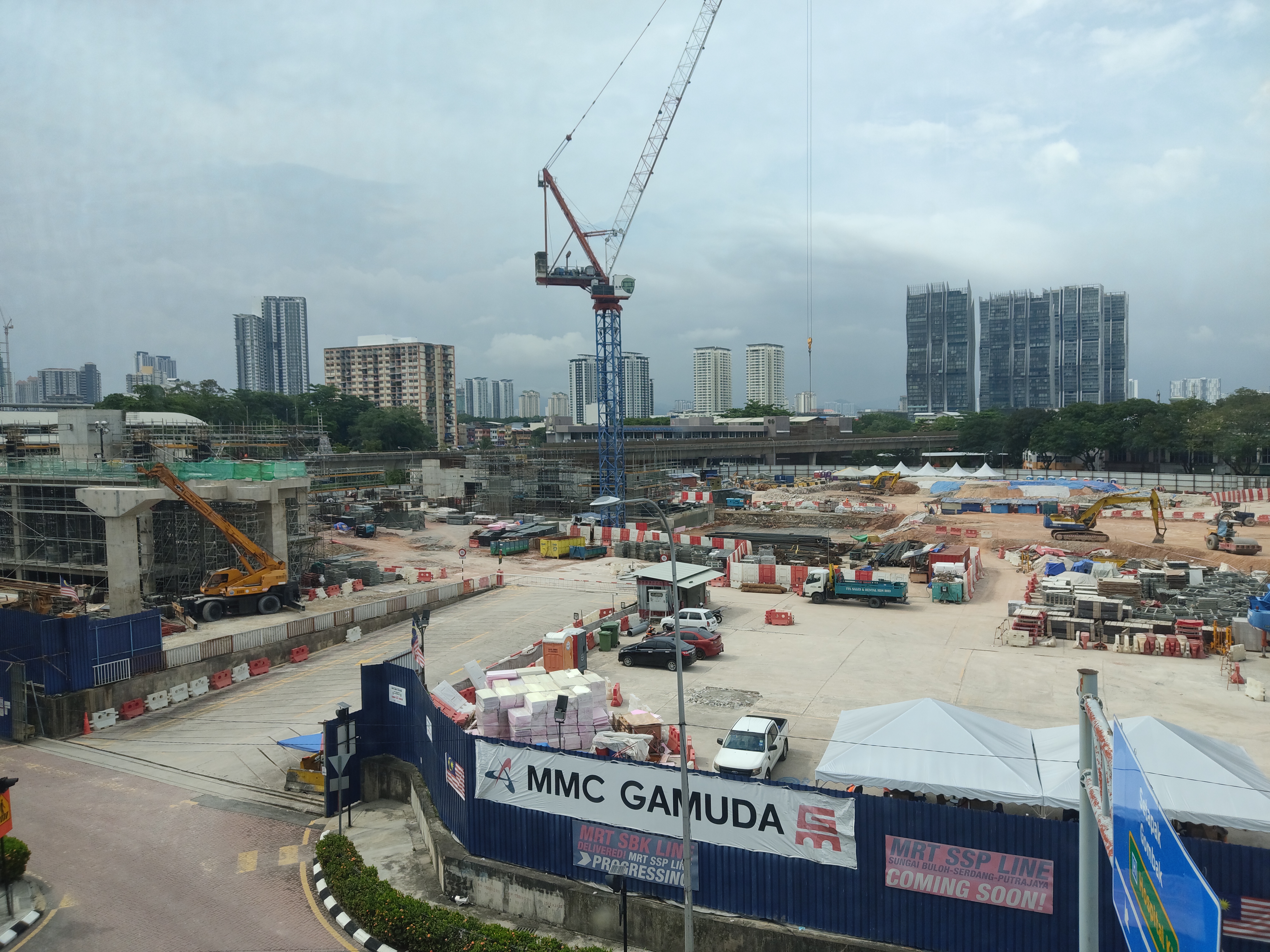
Construction of the MRT station in October 2021

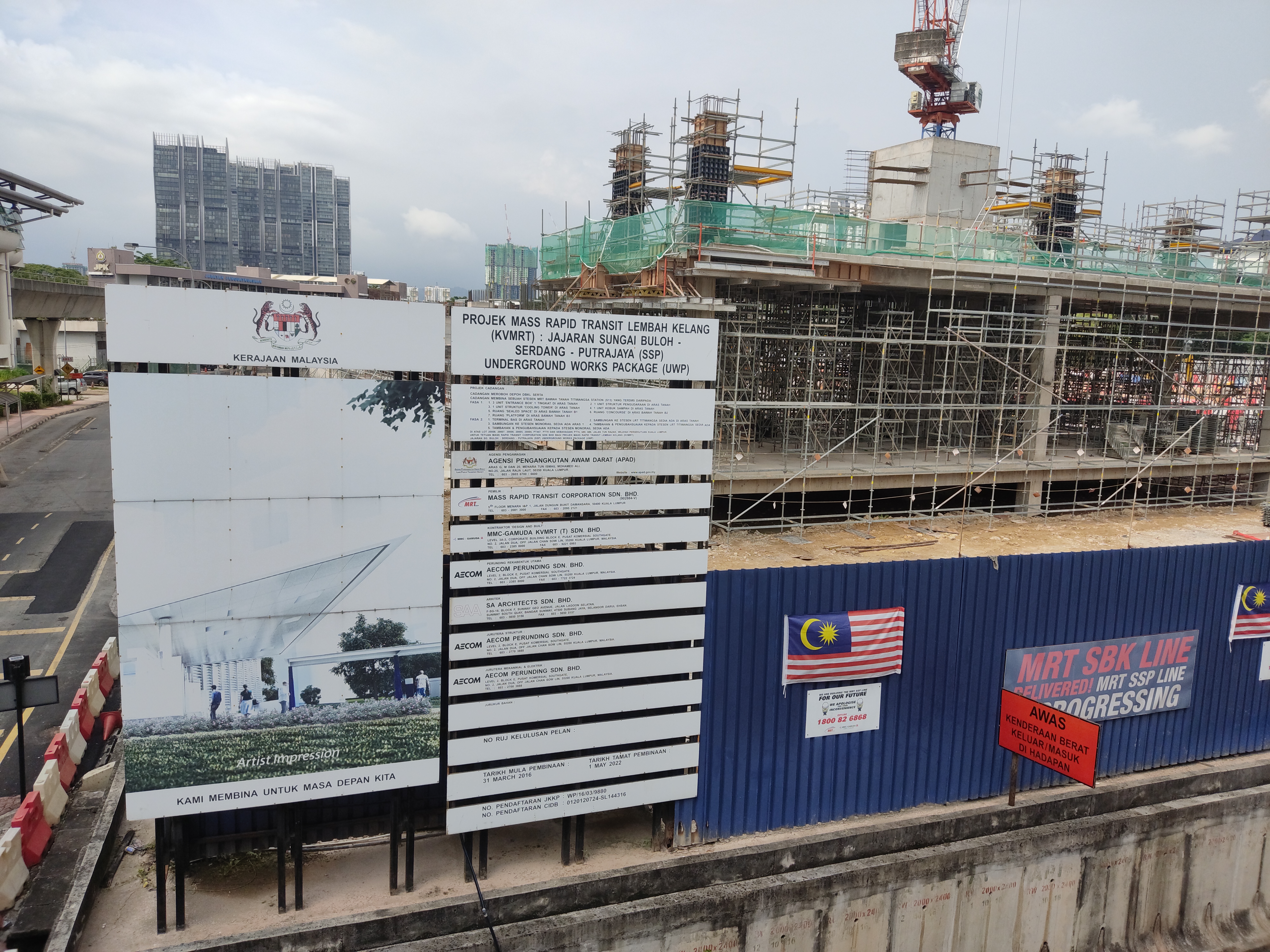
Underground MRT station construction site, 2021

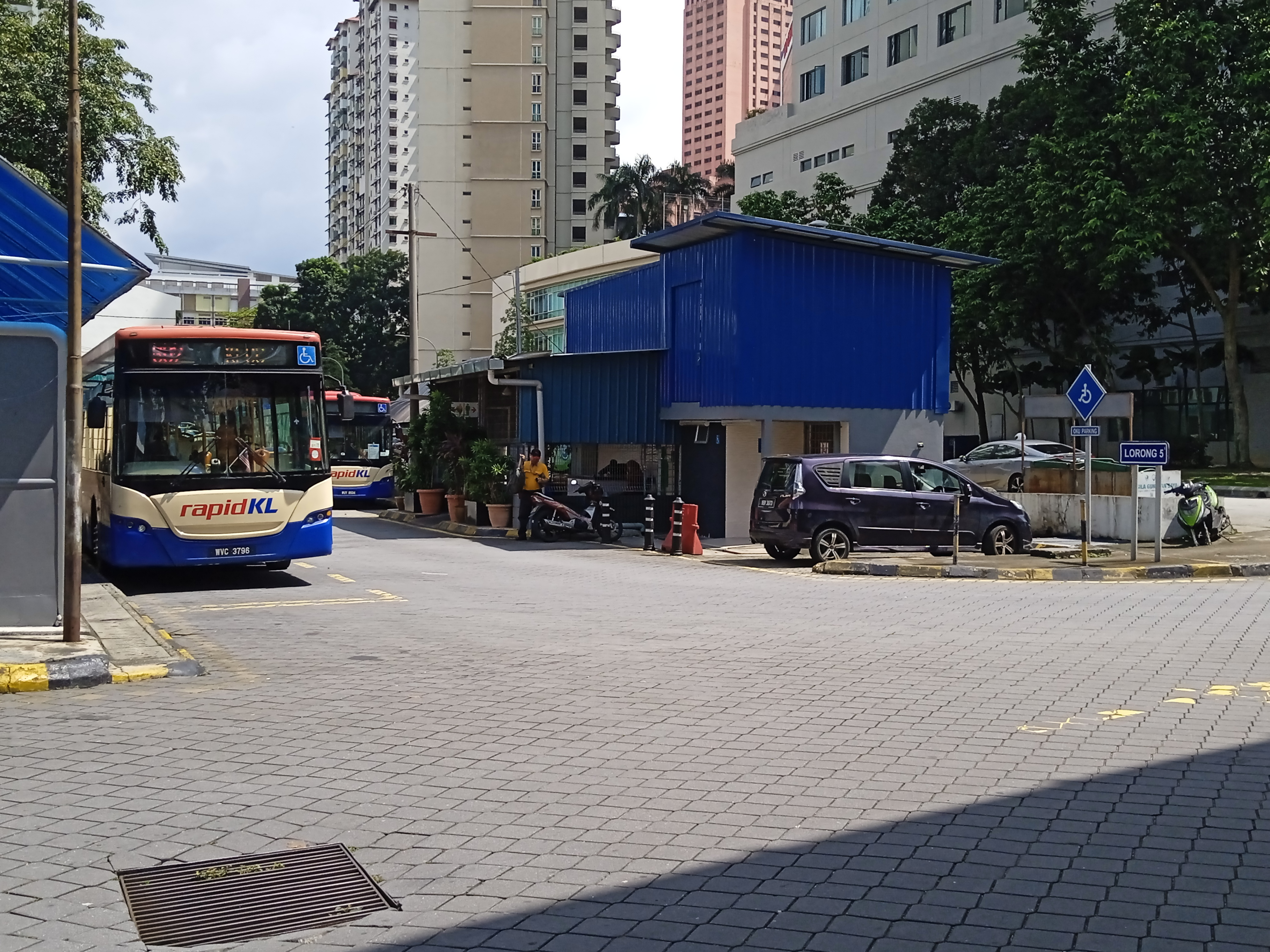
Titiwangsa bus hub, 2023
