= Kuala Lumpur Hospital =

Hospital Kuala Lumpur (HKL)
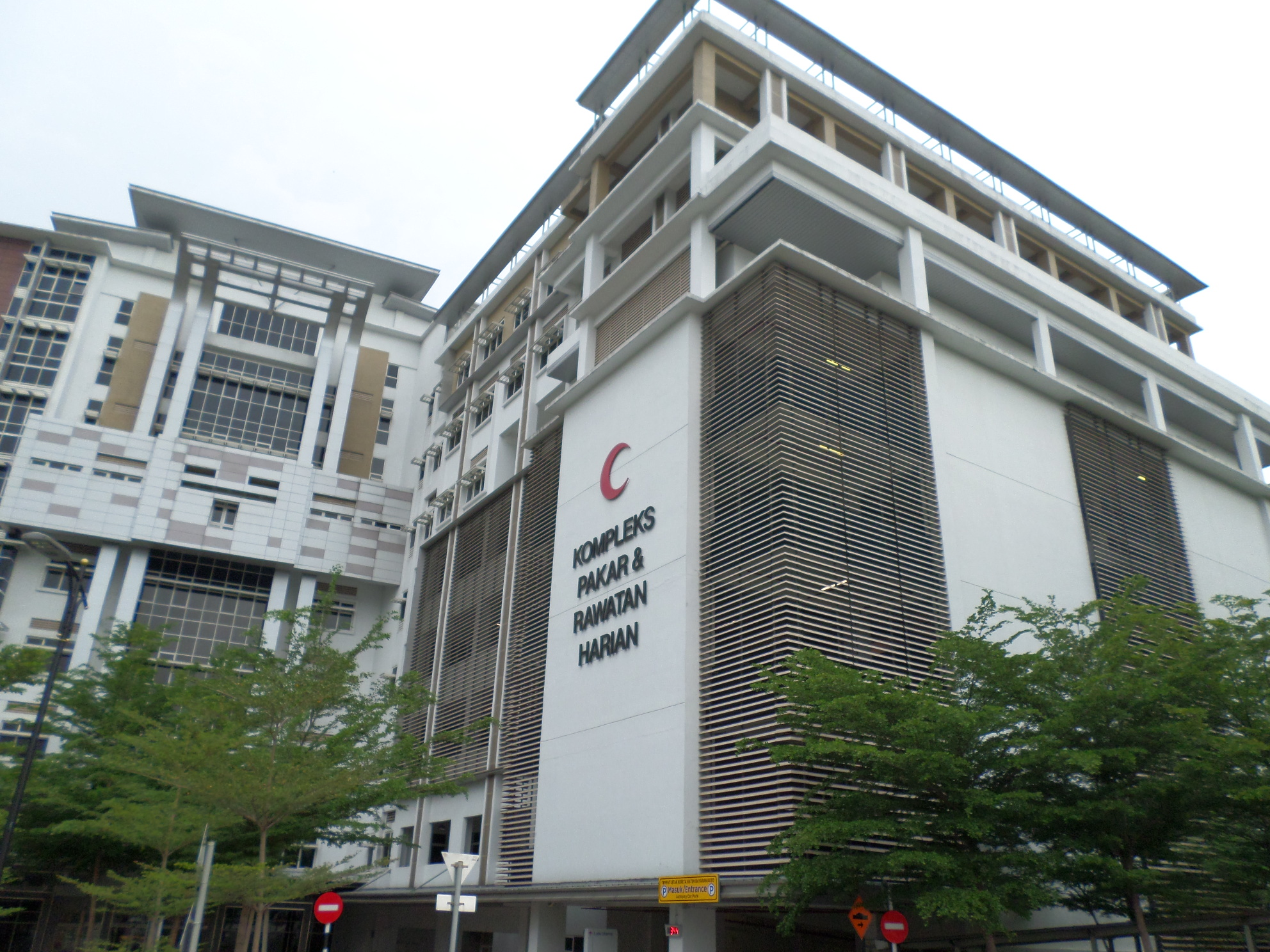

- Location within Kuala Lumpur

Geography
- Location: Jalan Pahang, Kuala Lumpur, Malaysia
- Coordinates: 3°10′17.2″N 101°42′06.5″E

Organisation
- Care system: Public
- Type: General
- Affiliated university: Perdana University Graduate School of Medicine (PUGSOM), Universiti Tunku Abdul Rahman

Services
- Emergency department: Yes
- Beds: 2,300

Helipads
- Helipad: Yes

History
- Founded: 1870; 156 years ago

Links
- Website: www.hkl.gov.my
- Lists: Hospitals in Malaysia

Kuala Lumpur Hospital (Malay: Hospital Kuala Lumpur, abbr: HKL) is the largest government-owned public hospital and higher specialised hospital in Kuala Lumpur, the capital city of Malaysia. It opened in 1870. HKL is a not-for-profit institution and serves as the flagship hospital of the Malaysian public healthcare system. It serves as a tertiary and referral hospital. It is located on 150 acres of prime land in the city with 84 wards and 2,300 beds, making it one of the largest hospitals in the world. More than 90 per cent of the beds are allocated for subsidized patients, providing access to an internationally established standard of affordable healthcare.

The hospital has 54 departments and units, including 29 clinical departments and 15 clinical support services. It has approximately 11,000 staff with almost 2,300 professionals in various fields. The staff includes 300 medical consultants and specialists, 1,300 medical officers, 72 matrons, 253 sisters (ward managers), 3,500 registered nurses, and 258 community nurses.

== History and future developments ==
- 1870: HKL was developed as a district hospital with three wards.
- 1920: Upgraded to 25 wards with 1st class, 2nd class and 3rd class wards classifications.
- 1962: HKL Maternity unit, North Ward Block, Radiotherapy Department, and hostels for staff were built.
- 1972: South Ward Block, Neurology Institute, Surgical Block, Radiology Block, National Blood Transfusion Centre, and more hostels were added.
- 1973: Specialist clinics, outpatient department, and doctors' hostel constructed.
- 1974: Trainee nurses' hostel and clubhouse added.
- 1975: Orthopaedic Institute, Urology Institute, Artificial Limb Centre, and Radiology Block established.
- 1992: Paediatric Institute constructed.
- 1997: Upgrading of the Institute of Radiotherapy, Oncology, and Nuclear Medicine.
- 2013: Specialist Complex & Ambulatory Care Centre (SCACC) opened, consisting of 16 clinical departments, support services such as pharmacy, pathology, radiology, Central Sterile Supply Unit (CSSU), and allied health services. SCACC provides 30 beds for daycare patients, 184 consultation rooms, 7 seminar rooms, and the Clinical Research Centre (CRC).
- 2017: A new 12-storey Women and Children’s Hospital with 600 beds, built at a cost of RM 850 million, is scheduled to open within HKL's compound, offering services such as labour and delivery, nursery, therapy, and women specialist clinics, child development center, pediatric specialist clinics, women's health center, neonatal intensive care, and obstetric wards. Future plans include a "school within a hospital" facility for children who are on long-term treatment and hospital-bound.

== Statistics ==
HKL handled over one million outpatients and 131,639 inpatients in 2015. In 2015, the total management expenditure for HKL reached RM 1 billion, whilst development expenditure exceeded RM 17 million. On average, HKL handles over 3,300 outpatient cases daily. The average hospital admission on a daily basis was over 360 cases, with over 44,500 surgeries and 14 million lab investigations conducted annually.

== Medical achievements ==
- 1964: A Kolff Dialysis machine was placed in HKL for the treatment of acute kidney injury. Also installed were the Thyroid Uptake Machine and a Rectilinear Scanner at the Nuclear Medicine unit.
- 1970: The first plastic surgical procedure and the first regular plastic surgery clinic were conducted at HKL.
- 1975: The first renal transplantation (living related) in Malaysia was performed at HKL, utilising an immunosuppressive protocol combining azathioprine and corticosteroids.
- 1976: The first cadaver renal transplantation in Malaysia was performed at HKL.
- 1982: HKL's newly-founded Department of Cardiothoracic Surgery performs the first Coronary Artery Bypass Graft (CABG) surgery in Malaysian history on 22 October 1982, led by Dr. Abdul Rozali-Wathooth (surgeon), Dr. Radha Krishna (anesthetist), Dr. Nik Zainal (cardiologist), and Sister Daphne Ho (staff nurse).
- 1993: A bone bank was established in HKL, supplying deep frozen bone allografts across the country.
- 1994: The first bone marrow transplant service started in HKL.
- 2012: HKL oversaw the first successful kidney transplant between a husband and wife with different blood types. Also, a pair of conjoined twins were successfully separated at HKL in a 24-hour surgery involving a 60-strong medical team, including 19 surgeons and anaesthetists, making them the 14th conjoined pair to be separated at HKL.

== Facilities and transportation ==
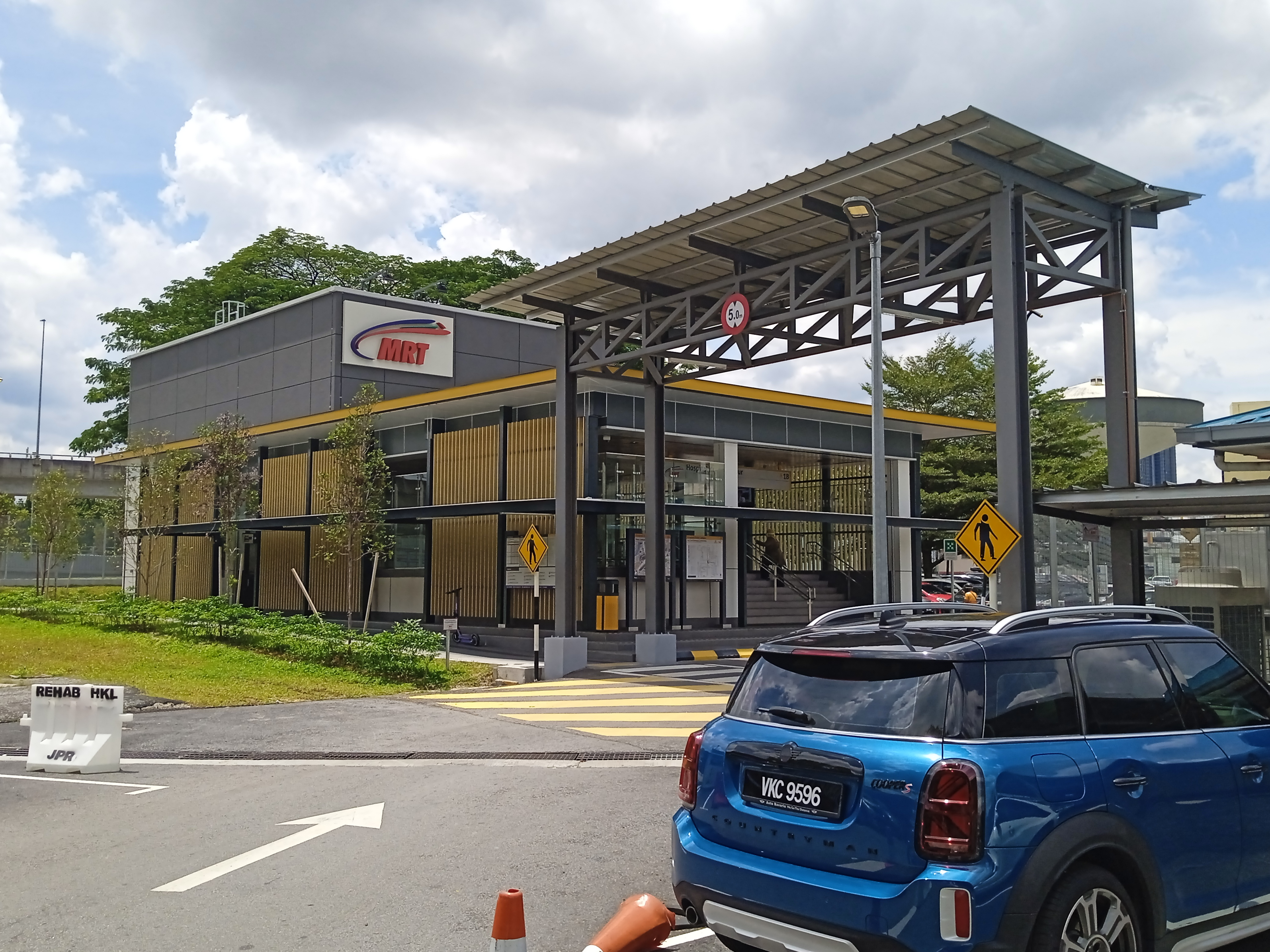
Entrance A of the Hospital Kuala Lumpur MRT station along Jalan Utama Hospital spur served the hospital within walking distance

Among the facilities available at the Kuala Lumpur Hospital are banking and finance, cafeteria, convenience stores, gymnasium, tennis court, police station, and a post office. The library and resource center for HKL patients and visitors is located in the main block. Mobile library services are available in selected wards. HKL also provides subsidized intermediate care and short-term accommodation for patients and caregivers who are not able to afford high living costs in the city.

The hospital is accessible within walking distance east of the Titiwangsa station. However, when the MRT Putrajaya line phase 2 opened in 2023, Hospital Kuala Lumpur station serves the hospital and the surrounding vicinity. Bus stop and taxi stands are available. There are 1,950 car park bays at HKL equipped with wireless parking lot detection and guidance system. In 2017, an additional 1,270 car park bays were planned, with the opening of the Women and Children’s Hospital (WCH) in HKL.

== Awards ==
- Global Brands Magazine Awards 2016 – Best Hospital Brand in Malaysia

== Gallery ==
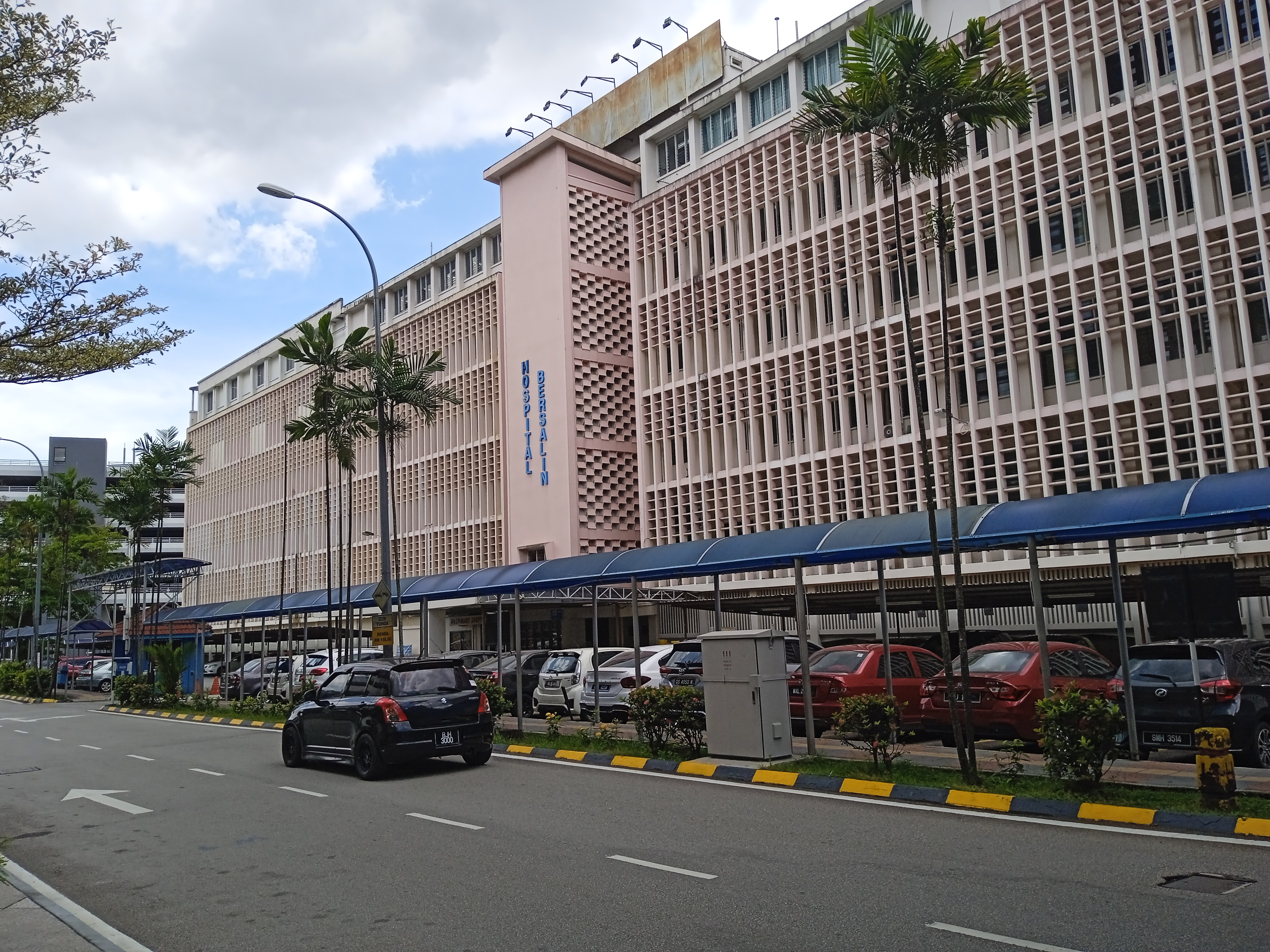
Maternity hospital (Hospital Bersalin) of HKL

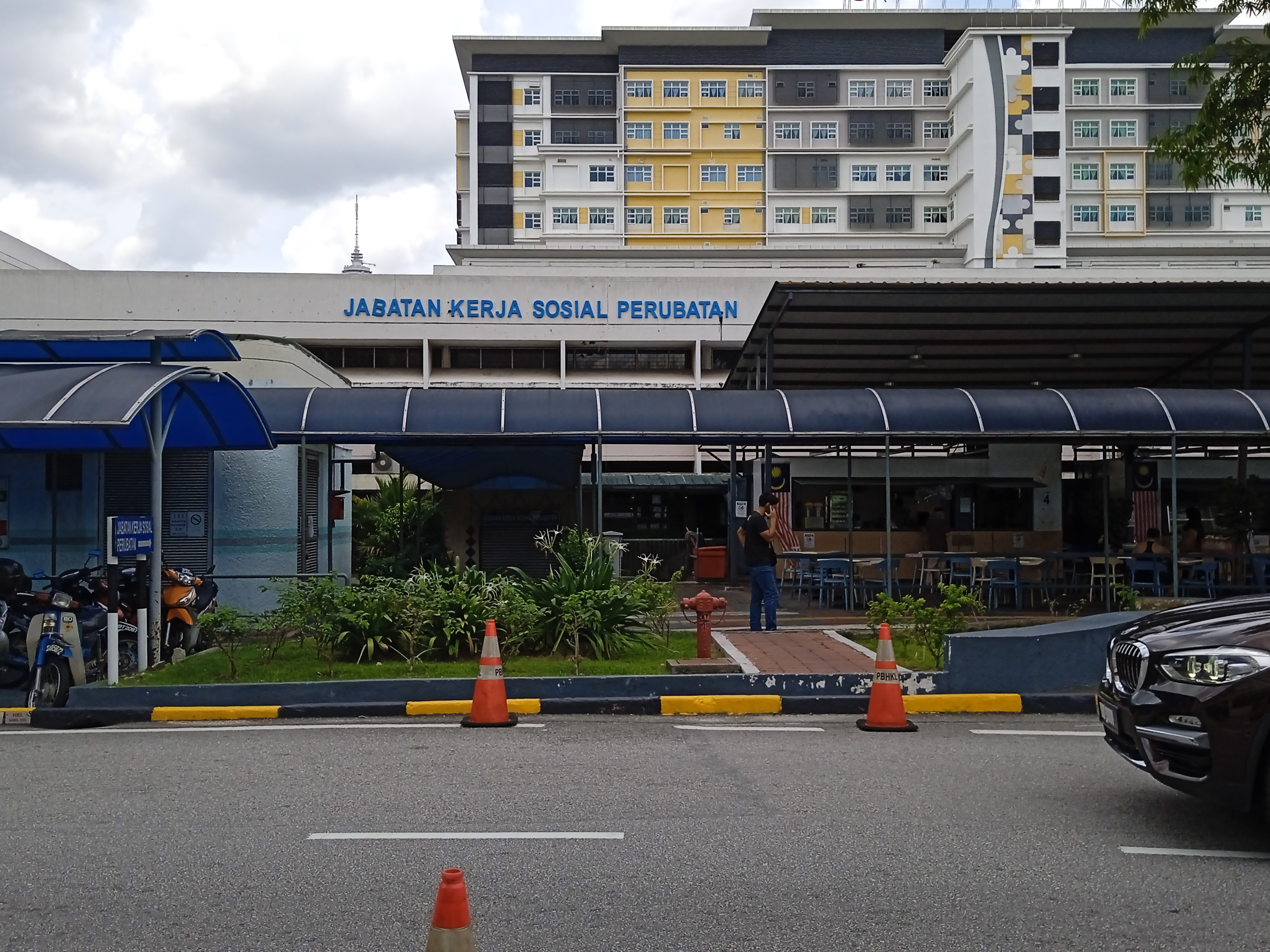
Medical Social Worker Department (Jabatan Kerja Sosial Perubatan) of HKL

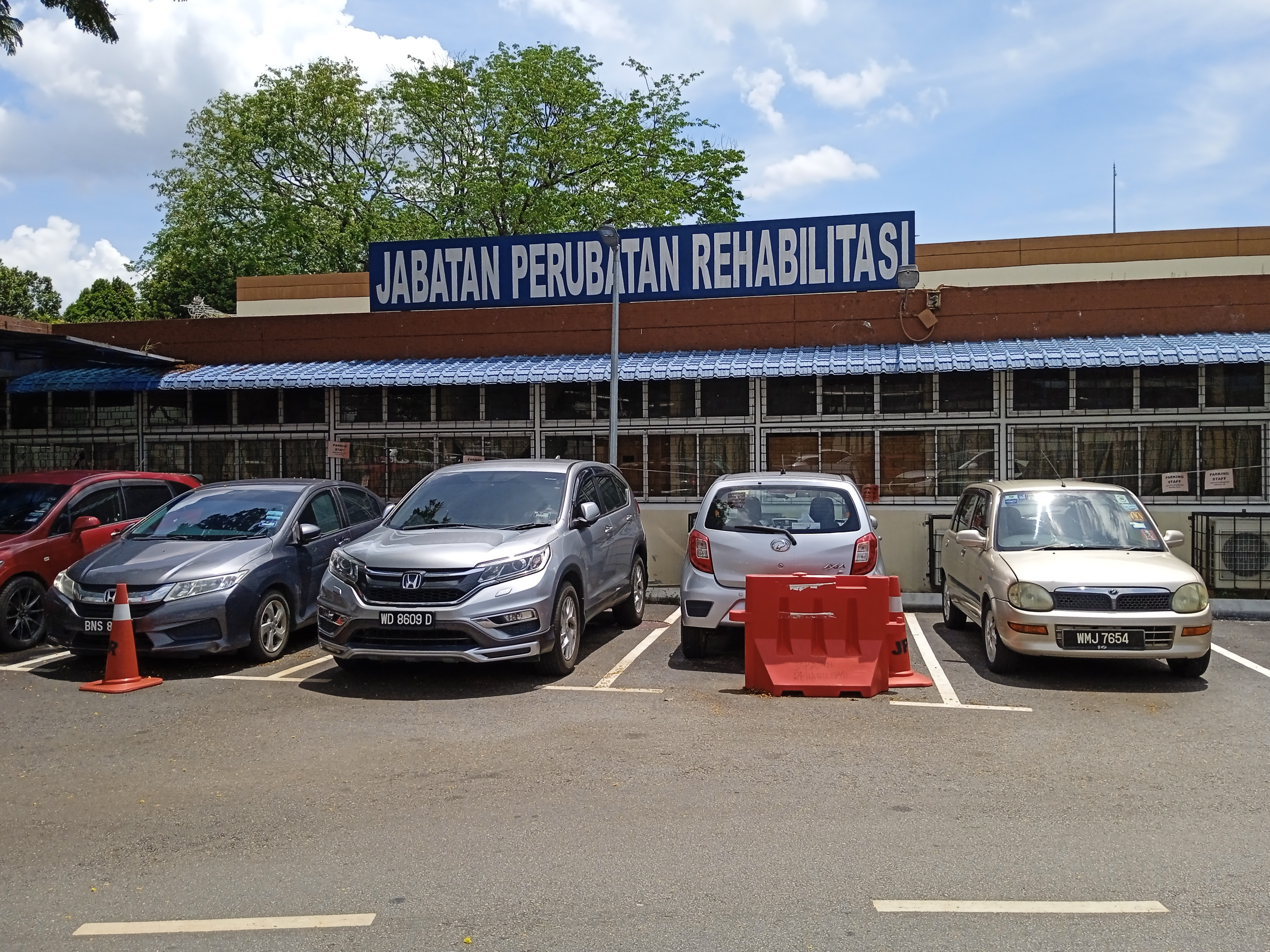
Rehabilitation Medicine Department (Jabatan Perubatan Rehabilitasi) of HKL

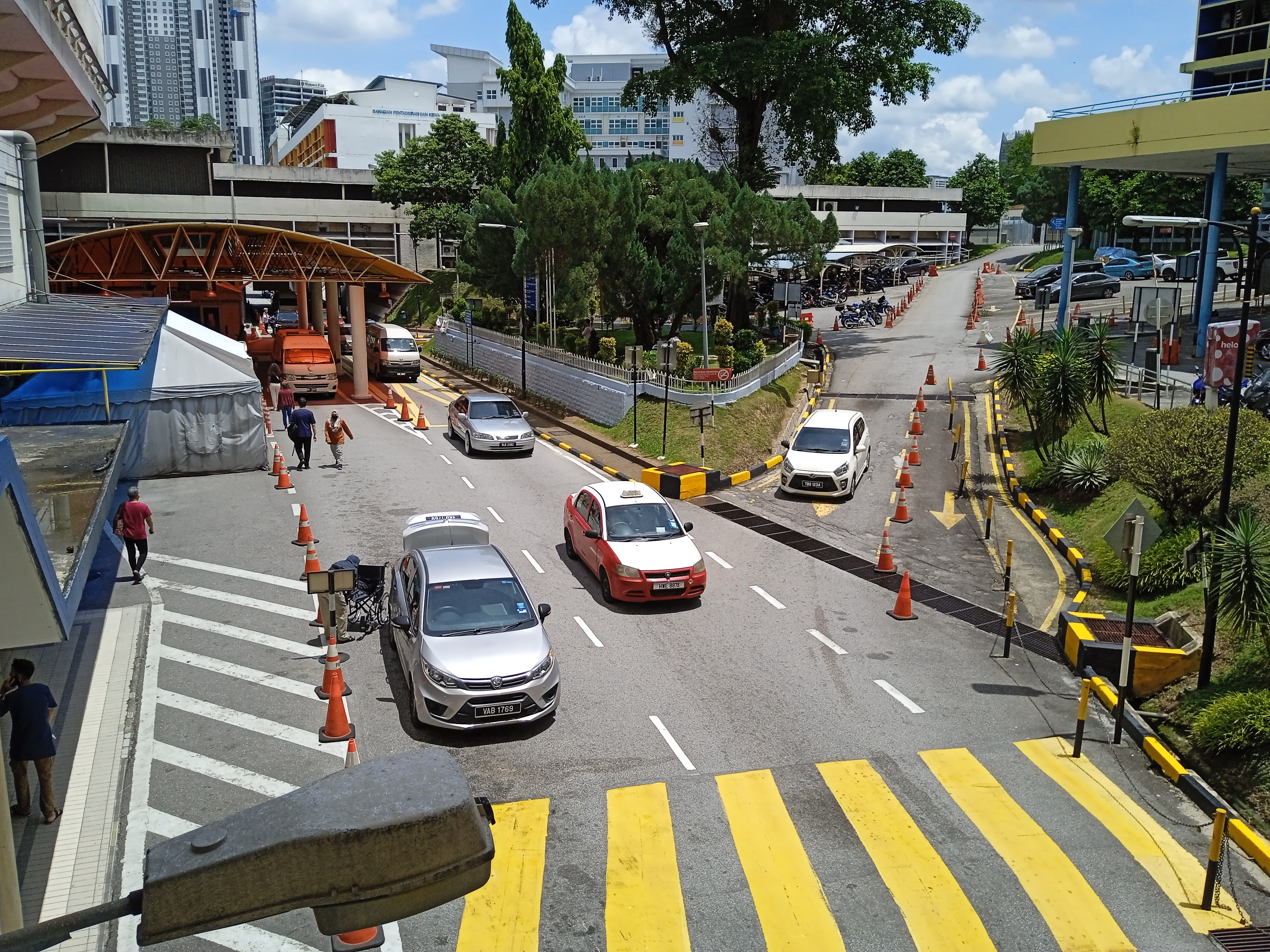
Main road of HKL, Jalan Utama Hospital, a spur from Jalan Pahang

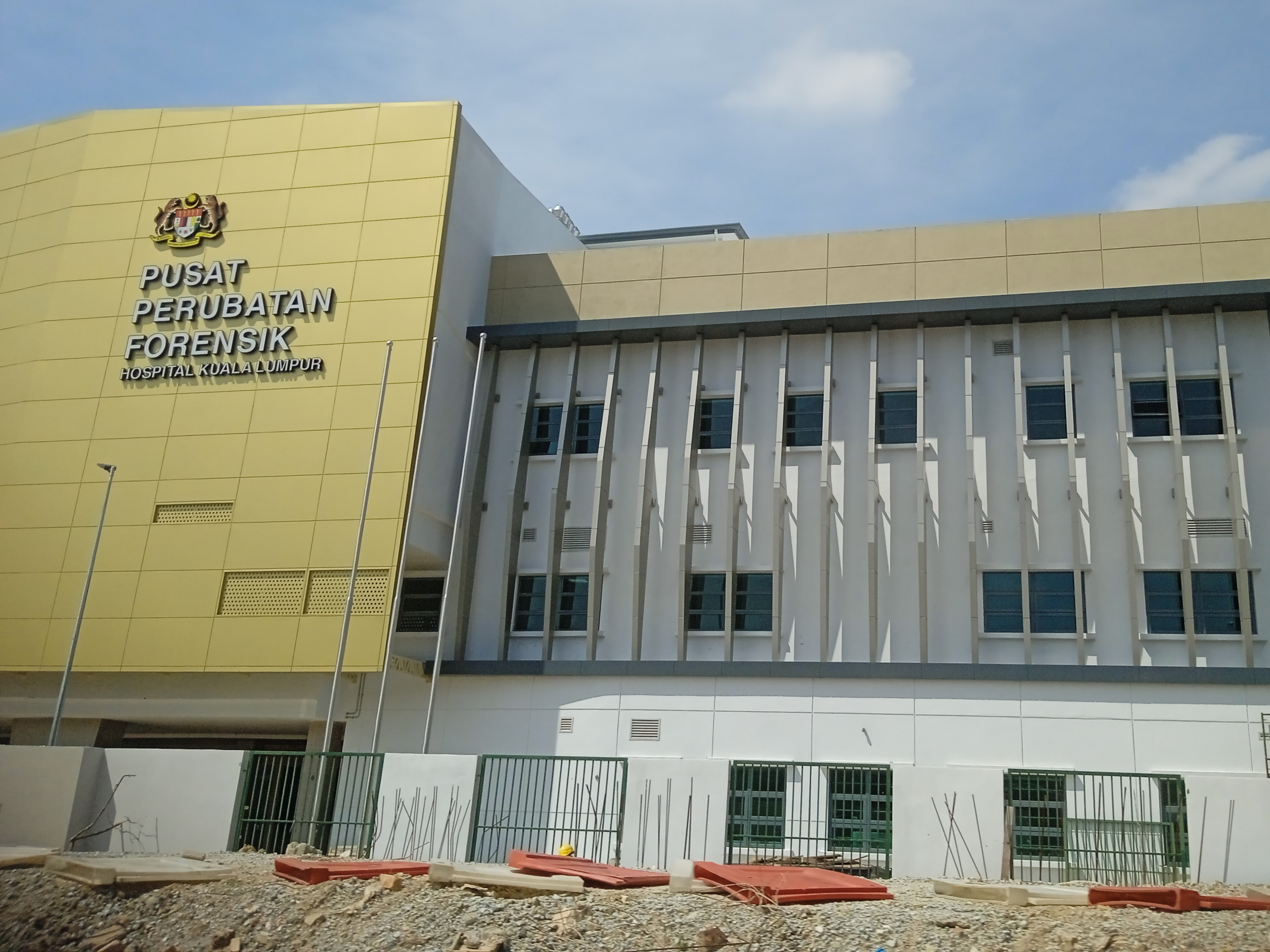
Forensic Medicine Center (Pusat Perubatan Forensik) of HKL

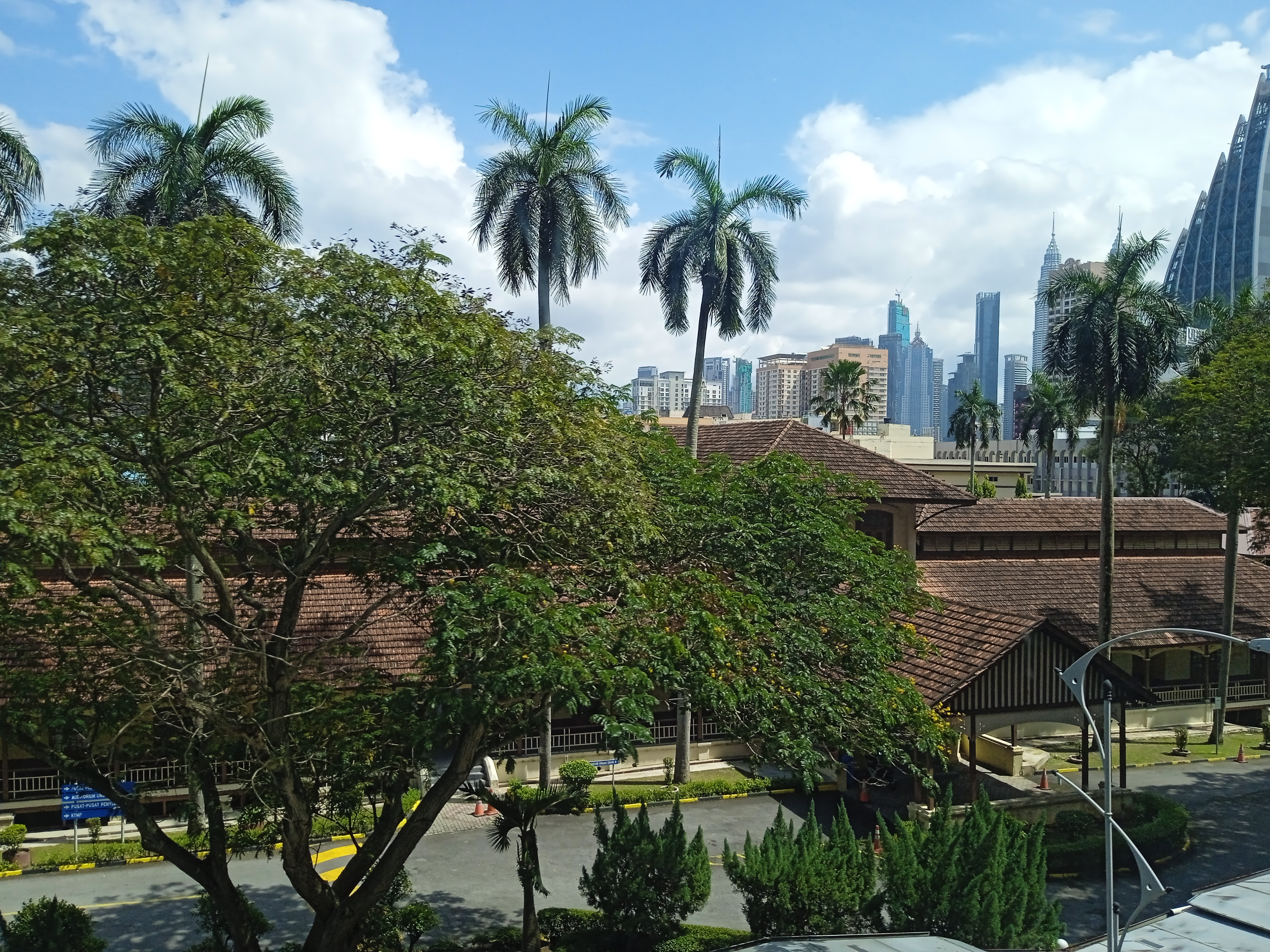
Biomedical Museum (Muzium Bioperubatan) of HKL

== See also ==
- Healthcare in Malaysia
