= Titiwangsa Lake Park =

Garden in Titiwangsa, Kuala Lumpur, Malaysia

- Taman Tasik Titiwangsa
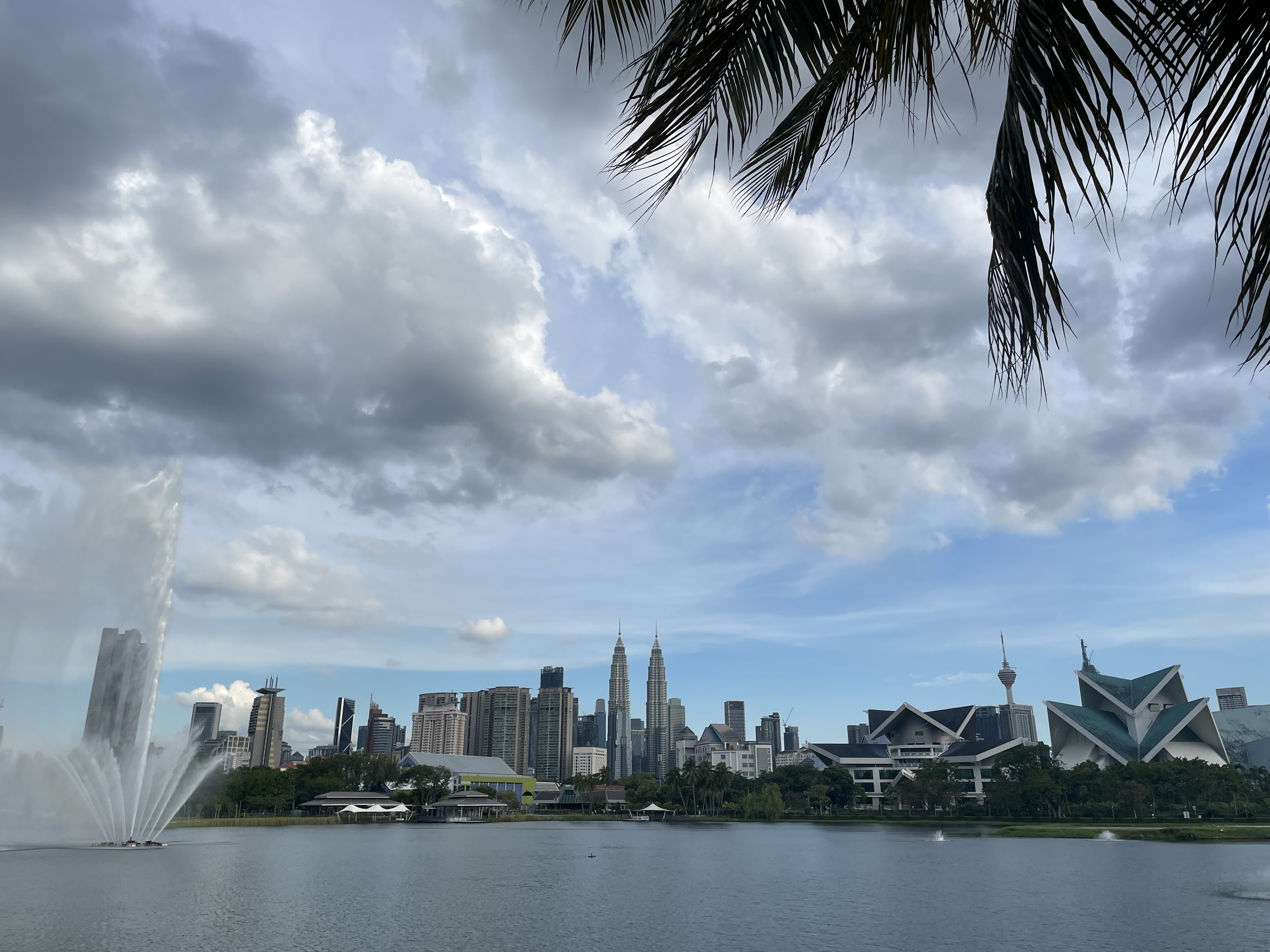
- View from Titiwangsa Lake Park
- Interactive map of Titiwangsa Lake Park
- Type: Urban park
- Location: Kuala Lumpur, Malaysia
- Coordinates: 3°10′41″N 101°42′28″E
- Area: 46.13 hectares (114.0 acres)
- Established: February 1, 1980

Titiwangsa Lake Park (Malay: Taman Tasik Titiwangsa) is an urban park in Titiwangsa, Kuala Lumpur, Malaysia.

== History ==
The gardens feature a large central lake that was a byproduct of tin mining activities under British Rule. Later on, the area was cleaned up and developed into a park. The name Titiwangsa was chosen because Titiwangsa is a mountain range that forms the backbone of Peninsular Malaysia. Before that, the park was named after Taman Jalan Kuantan. The name felt appropriate because the view of the park's flat land and its greenery reflected the scenery and climate of the mountain range.

== Architecture ==
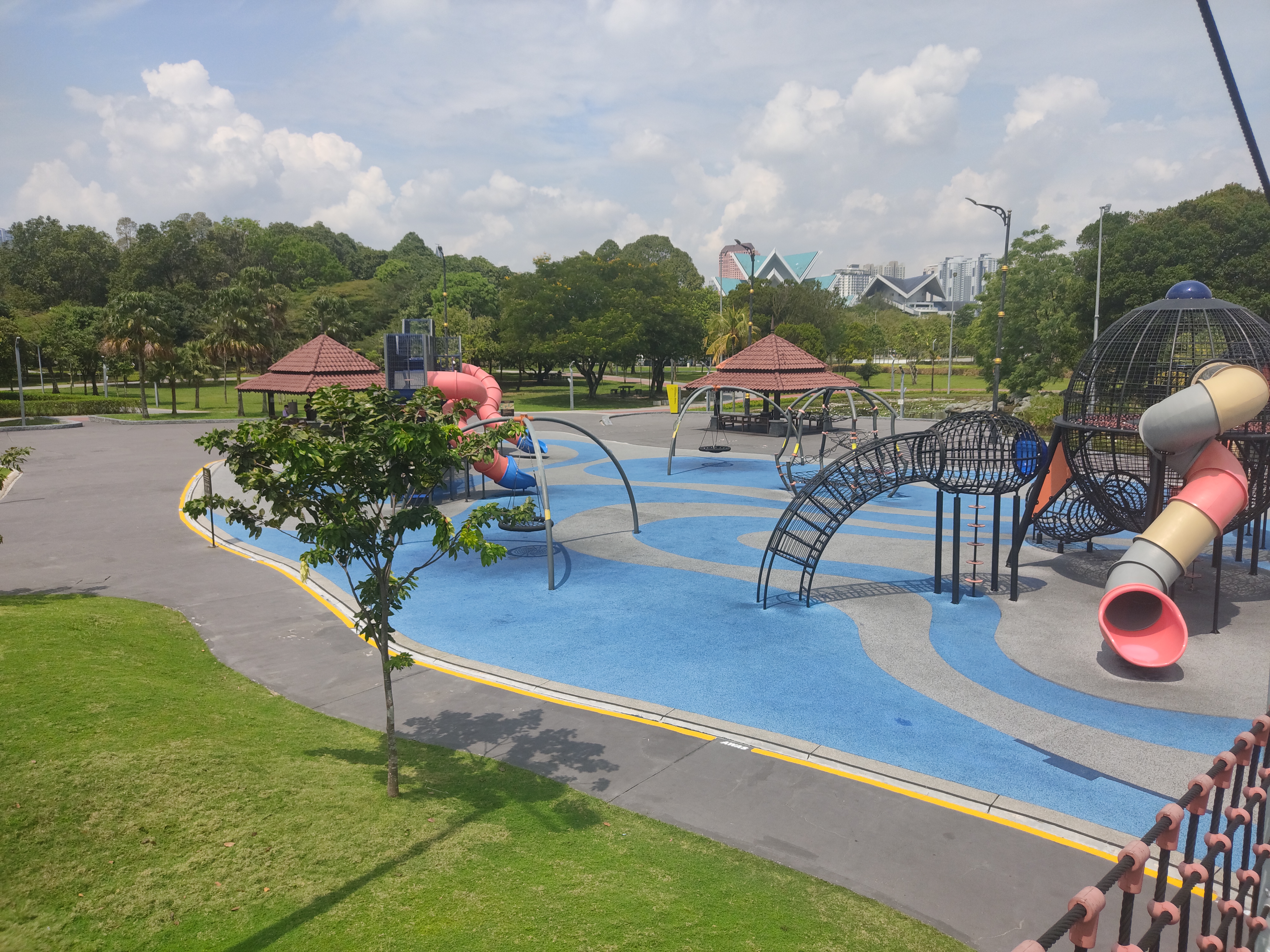
Children's playground facilities

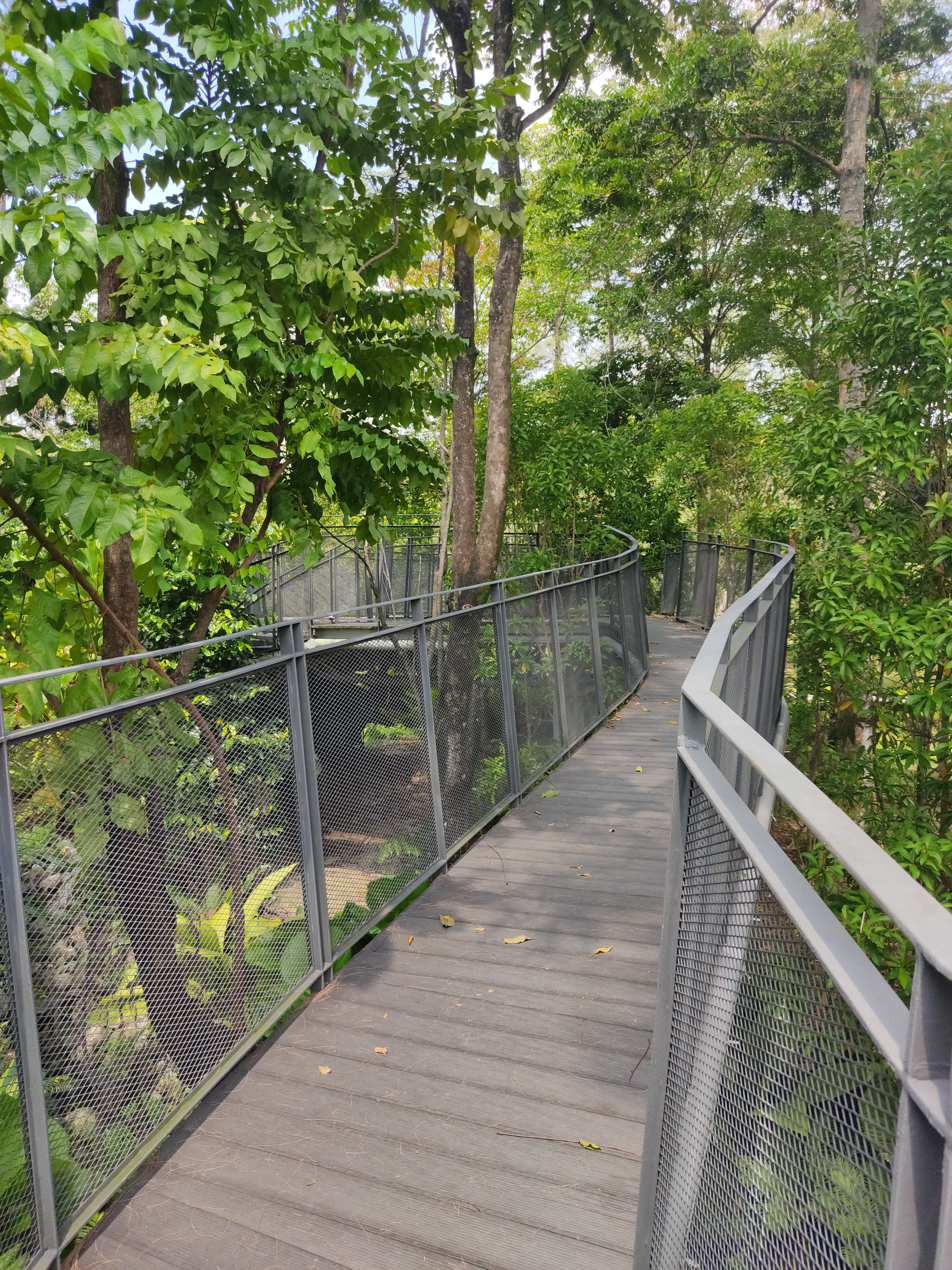
Titiwangsa Range Canopy Walk

The park spreads across an area of 95 hectares (230 acres) with a 57-hectare (140-acre) of lake. The lake garden has facilities such as a jogging track, cycling track, kayaking, horse riding facility, radio-controlled car racing track etc.

== Transport ==
The lake garden is within walking distance from Entrance B of the PY18 Hospital Kuala Lumpur MRT station served by the MRT Putrajaya Line.

== See also ==
- List of tourist attractions in Kuala Lumpur
- Mining in Malaysia
