= Kuala Lumpur Marathon =

Annual marathon in Malaysia

- The official logo of the KL Marathon under Standard Chartered Bank branding
- Date: October
- Location: Kuala Lumpur, Malaysia
- Event type: Road
- Distance: Marathon, Half marathon, 10k
- Primary sponsor: Standard Chartered Bank
- Established: 2009
- Course records: Men's: 2:11:04 (2022) (Kenya) Moses Kurgat; Women's: 2:34:37 (2011) (Kenya) Rose Nyangacha
- Website: Official website

The KL Standard Chartered Marathon is an annual marathon event held in Kuala Lumpur, Malaysia. The event was established in 1989. It is supported by the Malaysian Amateur Athletics Union (MAAU), Federal Territory Amateur Athletics Association (FTAAA) and Kuala Lumpur City Hall. In the 26th edition of the marathon in 2017, close to 36,000 runners participated in the event.

Standard Chartered Bank is currently the primary sponsor of the event and has been branding it as the Standard Chartered KL Marathon since 2009.

== Dates of the marathon ==
The marathon can be organized at any time of the year given Malaysia's consistent tropical weather. The marathon initially begun with a June date, but has since evolved to be held on any other month.

On four occasions the Kuala Lumpur Marathon was either postponed or cancelled, which occurred in 2013, 2015, 2020 and 2021, due to situations rendering the impracticability of holding the marathon.

Since 2019, the marathon has switched to a two-day format due to the growing number of runners, spread out over a race weekend period. The first day, a Saturday, will involve the Boost Juice 10 km, 5 km, 1 km and 2 km Kids Dashes, while the half and full marathons will take place on Sunday, the second day of the marathon.

Kuala Lumpur Standard Chartered Marathon dates (since 2009)
Year	Date	Remarks
2009	28 June	
2010	28 June	
2011	26 June	
2012	24 June	
2013	~~30 June~~ 29 September	Postponed due to the 2013 Southeast Asian haze
2014	12 October	
2015	4 October ~~10 October~~	Originally postponed to 10 October to coincide with the National Sports Day, but reverted back to 4 October and cancelled due to the 2015 Southeast Asian haze
2016	7 August	
2017	21 May	
2018	8 April	
2019	28/29 September	
2020	~~13th/14 June~~	Cancelled due to the COVID-19 pandemic and replaced with a virtual run from 5 to 13 December 2020
2021	~~12th/13 June~~	Cancelled due to the COVID-19 pandemic and replaced with a virtual run from 20 to 28 November 2021
2022	12/13 November	
2023	30 September/1 October	15th edition of Kuala Lumpur Standard Chartered Marathon
2024	5 October/6 October	
2025	4 October/5 October	
2026	3 October/4 October	

=== 2015 postponement controversy ===
On 13 July 2015, the Malaysian Ministry of Youth and Sports announced that the Kuala Lumpur Standard Chartered Marathon would be postponed by six days to Saturday, 10 October 2015, from the original date of 4 October. The purpose was to coincide with the launch of Malaysia's inaugural National Sports Day which is held annually on the second week of October.

Many runners who have signed up for the marathon criticized the sudden change, as the postponement would affect many of their plans. Some runners were intending to be participating in other running events on 10 October in addition to the KL Standard Chartered Marathon on the 4th, which resulted in dates being clashed. They also expressed worry that the marathon organizers were being forced to follow the Ministry's set date. Concern was also turned to the international runners who were planning to fly into Malaysia just for the marathon, as they need to change their flight tickets, which had already been booked. Critics also accused the government of trying to hijack the event for political mileage and take advantage of the marathon to achieve high turnout for the National Sports Day.

While added comparisons compared the marathon's 2015 postponement to the marathon's 2013 postponement and change of date, netizens excused the inconvenience resulting from the postponement of the 2013 marathon from 30 June to 29 September as the transboundary haze was generally unavoidable due to natural disaster-related concerns and the postponement was necessitated, while the new postponement was unnecessary just because it was to coincide with the National Sports Day, which itself could be moved to 4 October if there was a need to coincide with the marathon, or to hold a National Sports Week or declare October as the National Sports Month; both of which would include the marathon in it.

The added concern was also the new day of the week of the marathon, which is a Saturday as opposed to Sundays at the time when the marathon was a one-day event. Due to this inconvenient timing, many people would need to take advanced leave towards the end of a workweek and that roads would need to be closed in advance on a Friday evening which can affect traffic in the city.

In response to the announcement, the marathon organizers gave runners the option to cancel their registrations and request for a refund. Some runners did so, but the majority of participants protested the decision. Ong Kian Ming, the then-member of Parliament for Serdang, planned to hold a press conference to urge the government to rescind the original date as the new date would cause more logistical problems for the 38,000 runners who have already planned for the original date of 4 October. The Ministry eventually rescinded the marathon's date to the original schedule of 4 October following the backlash, in a statement on 16 July 2015.

I've read all your tweets, Facebook messages and emails regarding the date change of the Standard Chartered KL Marathon 2015. There are a few things I want to clear up.

The National Sports Day isn’t about achieving KPIs or hijacking events. There are noble intentions in what we were trying to do. We were trying to get as many Malaysians from different ethnicities, religions, age, location and walks of life out there as one to do as many sporting activities as possible on one day.

The power of sports to unite people can not be underestimated. When you’re running, cycling, lifting weights or playing football, they person next to you isn’t defined by what they look like, but rather what they’re able to achieve. Not in relation to you, but in relation to themselves. Sports has that power to show you what your limits are and then pushes you to exceed them.

Ten months ago, my ministry launched the Fit Malaysia initiative with this in mind. In that short time, we’ve seen great success in bringing people together. We’ve had tens of thousands of people who might ordinarily not exercise come out to join us in our fitness activities. We’ve had people who might ordinarily not mix around outside their ethnic boundaries come together as one. Everyone who’ve been at the events have been Malaysians.

The National Sports Day is the culmination of the Fit Malaysia movement -- one day in a year where everyone gets off the couch, comes out, and does something, not for fitness or sports, but for themselves. To join organised runs like the Standard Chartered KL Marathon or the Spartan Race, dance at the Score FitMob, play football or badminton, or just get out there to your local neighbourhood park with your loved ones and do something.

The National Sports Day is not a political event with a political agenda, like how Teachers Day or Cancer Awareness Month are not. It was to be our step towards becoming a sporting nation and to make sports and fitness part of a Malaysian culture, identity and lifestyle. We are a sports-loving nation but we are nowhere near being a sporting nation.

That was the idea behind changing the date of the Standard Chartered KL Marathon. It was a joint decision between the ministry, Standard Chartered, Dirigo Events and DBKL, and for that I thank them for their commitment and support to this national agenda. Not only them, but all the other organisers and partners who’ve pledged to pull their weight to come together on that one day.

It was not to “hijack” their event to artificially boost participation for the inaugural National Sports Day or to achieve my KPI. We were looking for several iconic events all around Malaysia and we realised that there is a hunger for running events, evident from the spots that have been quickly sold out in these events.

I have personally been reading a lot of your comments about the marathon and have held many discussions with the organisers and other stakeholders. We have jointly come to the conclusion that the Standard Chartered KL Marathon will be reverted back to October 4, considering the many issues that have been raised.

On behalf of the ministry, Standard Chartered, Dirigo and DBKL, I apologise for the inconvenience caused by the earlier change in date and I hope that you all will still come forward to support the National Sports Day.

Khairy Jamaluddin, Minister of Youth and Sports, in a statement on 16th July 2015

The 2015 Kuala Lumpur Standard Chartered Marathon was eventually cancelled due to a sudden resurgence in the 2015 Southeast Asian haze which affected most parts of Malaysia. Most runners were anxious over whether the marathon was going ahead, but the race was axed closer to race day.

=== Cancellation due to the COVID-19 pandemic ===
The COVID-19 pandemic begun with an outbreak in Wuhan, Hubei Province, China. The fast-spreading virus eventually caused a global outbreak which affected many countries. Governments worldwide eventually closed borders and declared lockdowns, and from 18 March 2020, Prime Minister Muhyiddin Yassin declared the Malaysian movement control order to mitigate the spread of COVID-19 in Malaysia.

The 2020 Kuala Lumpur Standard Chartered Marathon was scheduled to be held on 13 and 14 June 2020, and preparations for the marathon had been ongoing since the start of 2020. With the restriction of international travel to Malaysia, organizers initially explored the possibility of postponing the marathon to a later date or finding a suitable venue to hold the marathon. However, all odds showed signs of uncertainty, forcing the cancellation of the 2020 marathon.

Individuals who have registered for the 2020 race were deferred to the year 2021. Consequently, the marathon scheduled for 2021 was to take place in the second week of June according to the organizers. This meant that the second weekend of June, 12 and 13 June 2021, were chosen. However, the 2021 marathon would also be cancelled due to the pandemic, and registrations deferred once again to the 2022 Kuala Lumpur Standard Chartered Marathon, which proceeded as planned on 12 and 13 November 2022. Runners who wish to cancel their registration were given the opportunity to do so.

To compensate for the cancellation of both marathons, runners were given the option to do a virtual run from 5 to 13 December 2020 and 20 to 28 November 2021.

== Course ==
The current route was approved by the Association of International Marathons and Distance Races and International Association of Athletics Federations and it will be utilised until 2015.

The Dataran Merdeka is the starting and ending points of this marathon. Runners who participate this marathon will run through the notable places and landmarks in Kuala Lumpur such as National Mosque, National Museum, Kuala Lumpur Railway Station, KL Sentral, Mid Valley Megamall, Thean Hou Temple, Stadium Negara, Royal Selangor Golf Club, Bukit Bintang, Jalan Imbi, KL Tower, Petronas Twin Towers, Istana Budaya, PWTC, Parlimen Malaysia and end at Dataran Merdeka.

Roads that are affected by the marathon race route are closed to traffic throughout the duration of the race for runners' safety. Water stations are available in every two kilometres and there are 24 water stations throughout the 42-kilometre route. Volunteers and medical personnel are also on stand-by at every station.

=== Routes since 2022 ===
Following the COVID-19 pandemic where the marathons were cancelled, the current route for the full marathon was introduced. The routes are planned in order to give runners a view around Kuala Lumpur's central business district.

The marathon route begins at Dataran Merdeka and goes along Jalan Raja Laut and the Jalan Tuanku Abdul Rahman shopping district before heading towards Jalan Ampang. Runners would pass by the SOGO Shopping Center and the red light district of Jalan Tuanku Abdul Rahman. The course then continues down Jalan Tuanku Abdul Rahman, passing by the Dang Wangi police headquarters and the various shops in the Jalan Masjid India area. Runners would then follow Jalan Ampang towards the Bukit Nanas station where they can catch a glimpse of the Kuala Lumpur Tower.

The route than turns into Jalan Sultan Ismail to give runners a tour of the Bukit Bintang area, where runners would head past shopping malls and various landmarks, such as Wisma Genting, Lot 10, Sungei Wang Plaza and Bukit Bintang Plaza. Runners then circle around the Pavilion Kuala Lumpur shopping mall and retrace their steps on Jalan Sultan Ismail back towards Jalan Ampang before continuing on the road.

The run then passes by the Malaysia Tourism Center and the old Lai Meng girls' school before reaching the Petronas Towers. Runners then pass the Avenue K shopping center and cross Jalan Tun Razak via a flyover and head down the Embassy Row, passing the various foreign embassies located around the area. Runners would be treated to a straight course as they run down the road. The runners then continue down Jalan Ampang and meet Jalan Jelatek, in which they follow that road to head to the Ampang-Kuala Lumpur Elevated Highway.

The runners then run up the ramp leading towards the highway, following the course of the expressway, as they cross the Jalan Tun Razak and bypass the Saloma Bridge. Then, they reach the highway's intersection with Jalan Sultan Ismail, where they make a U-turn to head back in the reverse order of the highway. Runners would pass the AKLEH toll plaza twice on this route. They then cross the halfway point of the marathon when passing the Setiawangsa-Pantai Expressway.

The marathon route then crosses into the Kuala Lumpur Middle Ring Road 2 and continue along the road, as the runners exit the AKLEH Highway. After 2 kilometers, runners then enter the Duta-Ulu Kelang Expressway (DUKE) to continue their journey back to Dataran Merdeka.

The DUKE Expressway is the toughest section of the entire marathon. The 10-kilometer stretch of highway consist of large flyovers, viaducts and hills along the entire course. Most runners would feel fatigued upon entering the expressway due to the inclines along the road, as most inclines can go on for at least a kilometre or more.

The entrance to the DUKE Expressway is the route with the steepest incline and elevation, and it can be considered a test of patience as one attempts this route. After entering the expressway, a steep incline of 3 kilometres persist before a sudden drop of 1 kilometre where the course meets Jalan Jelatek and the Setiawangsa-Pantai Expressway. Then, a windy curve and flat course meet before another 500-metre incline onto a flyover before the route drops again.

During the marathon, the DUKE Expressway is closed in only the westbound direction heading towards Petaling Jaya, Shah Alam and Sungai Buloh. Hence, runners can see free-flowing traffic along the other side of the highway. They then pass the eastbound toll plaza which is on the opposite side of the highway. Runners then climb a flyover as the route passes the Titiwangsa area. They then enter the Jalan Sultan Azlan Shah neighborhood as the highway passes along the neighborhood.

The marathon course then exits the DUKE Expressway at the Batu toll plaza which is on the westbound side of the highway, to meet Jalan Kuching, where runners would use this road to head back to Dataran Merdeka. Runners would then pass a checkpoint at this area to collect wristbands in order to claim their finisher entitlements. The route then passes the Sentul area to meet up with the Bukit Tunku area. At the 40th kilometre, runners pass by Jalan Sultan Ismail, in which half marathon runners merge with the full marathon runners. The route then meets Dataran Merdeka and Bulatan Dato Onn at the 41st kilometre. Runners then go up a flyover and a hill and make a 180-degree u-turn to enter Dataran Merdeka via the southern road exit from Jalan Raja before finishing in front of the Sultan Abdul Samad Building.

== Winners ==
This list of winners below only applies to Full Marathon (42 km) only. The marathon has two categories, namely the Open category and the Malaysian category.

=== Open category ===
Key: Course record

Date	Men's winner	Nationality	Time (h:m:s)	Women's winner	Nationality	Time (h:m:s)
28 June 2009	Julius Karinga	Kenya	2:18:24	Fridah Lodepa	Kenya	2:40:13
28 June 2010	Nelson Rotich	Kenya	2:16:44	Goitetom Haftu	Ethiopia	2:46:44
26 June 2011	Lilan Kiproo	Kenya	2:20:08	Rose Nyangacha	Kenya	2:34:37
24 June 2012	Lilan Kiproo	Kenya	2:14:45	Elizabeth Chemweno	Kenya	2:40:24
29 September 2013	Kennedy Lilan Kiproo	Kenya	2:19:01	Rose Kosgei	Kenya	2:41:05
12 October 2014	Lilan Kiproo	Kenya	2:17:47	Hellen Mugo	Kenya	2:43:22
4 October 2015	Race cancelled due to Southeast Asian haze					
7 August 2016	Lilan Kiproo	Kenya	2:18:57	Hirut Beyene	Ethiopia	2:39:02
21 May 2017	Cosmas Matolo	Kenya	2:18:42	Elizabeth Rumokol	Kenya	2:36:13
8 April 2018	Cosmas Matolo	Kenya	2:16:46	Elizabeth Rumokol	Kenya	2:38:47
29 September 2019	Victor Kipchirchir	Kenya	2:19:41	Gladys Chemweno	Kenya	2:36:45
14 June 2020	Race cancelled due to COVID-19 pandemic					
20 November 2021	Race cancelled due to COVID-19 pandemic					
13 November 2022	Moses Kurgat	Kenya	2:11:04	Shelmith Nyawira	Kenya	2:44:16
1 October 2023	Kiprop Tonui	Kenya	2:13:49	Beatrice Jelagat Cherop	Kenya	2:32:51
6 October 2024	Vincent Kiprono	Kenya	2:18:15	Beatrice Jelagat Cherop	Kenya	2:33:45
5 October 2025	John Nzau Mwangangi	Kenya	2:17:28	Truphena Chepchirchir	Kenya	2:41:36
4 October 2026	Ezekiel Kemboi	Kenya	2:21:19	Alemitu Ajema Lema	Ethiopia	2:39:29

=== Malaysian category ===
Date	Men's winner	Time (h:m:s)	Women's winner	Time (h:m:s)
26 June 2011	Shaharudin Bin Hashim	2:42:36	Emelyne Teo Jia Wei	3:32:24
24 June 2012	Shaharudin Bin Hashim	02:42:27	Ling Mee Eng	03:36:48
29 September 2013	Fabian @ Osmond Bin Daimon	2:41:55	Yuan Yu Fang	3:37:16
12 October 2014	Muhaizar Mohamad	02:41:11	Yuan Yu Fang	03:34:27
4 October 2015	Race cancelled due to Southeast Asian haze			
7 August 2016	Muhaizar Mohamad	2:39:25	Yuan Yu Fang	3:19:04
21 May 2017	Muhaizar Mohamad	2:35:55	Yuan Yu Fang	3:22:59
8 April 2018	Muhaizar Mohamad	02:37:03	Loh Chooi Fern	03:18:44
29 September 2019	Muhaizar Mohamad	02:35:23	Loh Chooi Fern	03:21:33
14 June 2020	Race cancelled due to COVID-19 pandemic			
20 November 2021	Race cancelled due to COVID-19 pandemic			
13 November 2022	Poo Vasanthan A/L Subramaniam	02:37:55	Noor Amelia Binti Musa	03:13:58
1 October 2023	Poo Vasanthan A/L Subramaniam	02:37:38	Chua Khit Yeng	03:13:07
6 October 2024	Muhaizar Mohamad	02:41:17	Noor Amelia Binti Musa	03:09:44
5 October 2025	Yeow Ni Jia	02:36:13	Chua Khit Yeng	03:05:40
4 October 2026	Yeow Ni Jia	02:33:52	Esther Joy Chen Hong Li	03:05:22

== High Performance Category ==
The High Performance Category is the elite field of marathon runners and is applicable to anyone participating in the Full Marathon, Half Marathon and the 10 km run. Runners who wish to enter this category would need to fit certain qualifying times to enter into the elite field of runners. First introduced in 2024, this field of runners would only be entitled to the cash prize if they win the marathon. Ordinary runners who win the marathon, however, will be forfeited of the cash prize but still be recognized for their efforts.

High Performance Category Qualifying Times (Full Marathon)
Category	Time (h:m:s)
Men Open	03:15:00
Women Open	04:00:00
Malaysian Men Open	03:15:00
Malaysian Women Open	04:00:00
Men Veteran	03:25:00
Women Veteran	04:15:00
Malaysian Men Veteran	03:25:00
Malaysian Women Veteran	04:15:00

== Deaths and incidents ==
In 2010, a runner in the 10 km category collapsed and suffered a seizure. Lim Wei Yee, 25, died on the way to the hospital. In 2019, two participants were injured when a car had crashed into runners at the marathon after it ploughed through safety barriers.

During the 2022 edition of the marathon, another runner collapsed while passing the marathon course on Jalan Dang Wangi while attempting the half marathon category. He failed to regain consciousness upon being taken to the Kuala Lumpur Hospital. Following such incidents, the organizing team of the marathon established the 'Medic on the Run' programme in collaboration with Pantai Hospital Kuala Lumpur in order to have an enhanced emergency response team to deal with emergency situations in future marathons, starting with the 2024 edition, which comprise staff from the hospital.

== Charity benefits ==
The marathon for charity purpose category that allows runners to raise funds for charity such as Seeing is Believing was first organised in Kuala Lumpur Marathon on 2009 under the name "Run For A Cause". During the first charity marathon, more than RM 500,000 has been earned from the event. Starting 2010, five organisations such as Malaysian Association for the Blind (MAB), Malaysian AIDS Foundation (MAF), National Cancer Society of Malaysia (NCSM), Children's Environmental Heritage Foundation (YAWA) and Standard Chartered Trust Funds (SCTF) are also benefited by the charity earned from this marathon event. In addition, the Corporate Challenge, similar to "Run For A Reason" charity marathon category was also introduced but this category is open to the company that run in a team. In 2011 marathon, a total of RM 486,668 has been raised for charity purpose. The contributor to the 2011 marathon charity fund will include the company Petronas Chemicals Group (RM 30,000) and Freescale Semiconductor (Malaysia) (RM 20,000).
