= Jalan Jelatek =

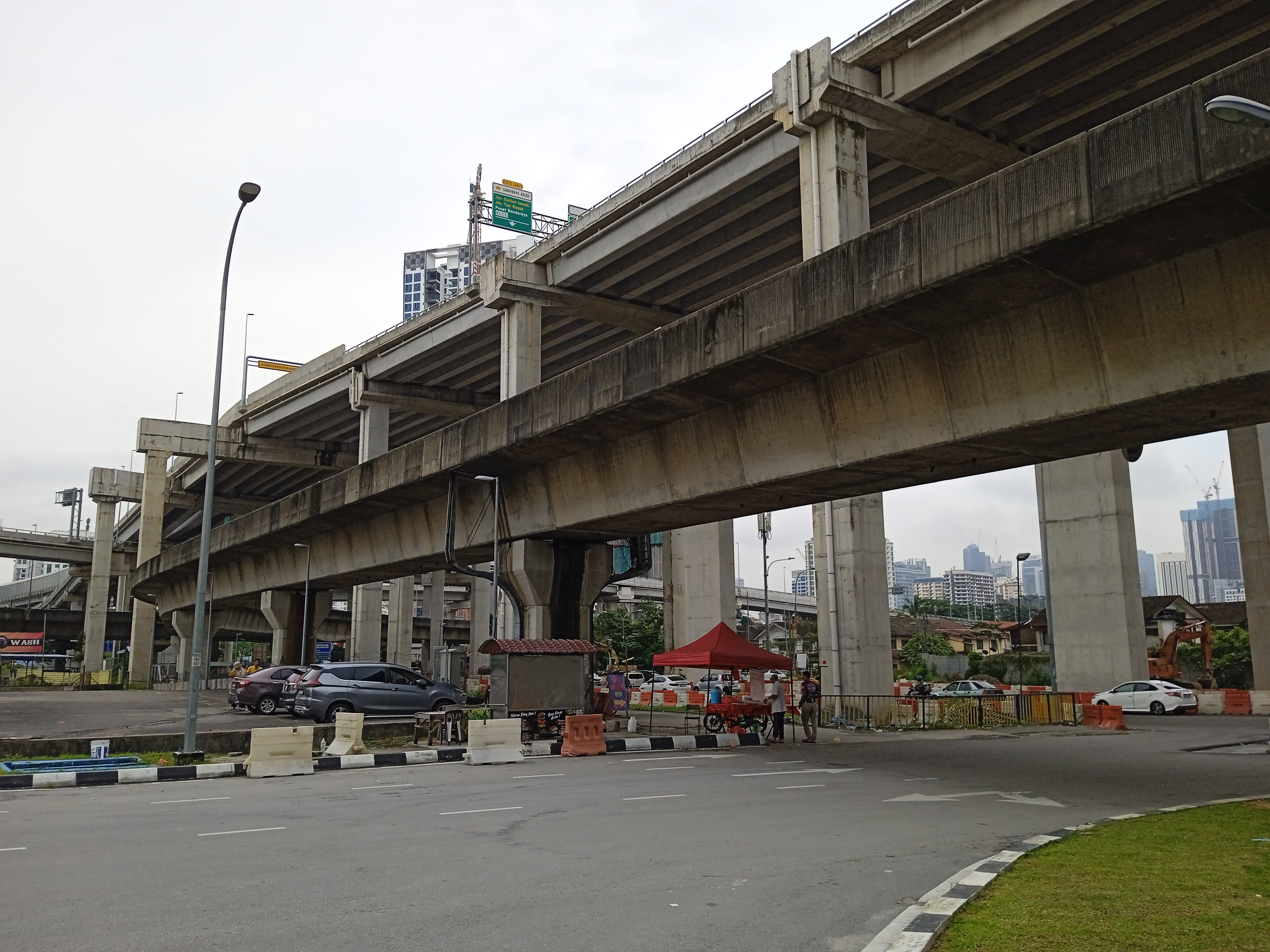
- A segment of the road beside the Jelatek LRT station.

Route information
- Length: 4.0 km (2.5 mi)

Major junctions
- North end: Duta–Ulu Klang Expressway; Setiawangsa–Pantai Expressway; Setiawangsa
- South end: Ampang–Kuala Lumpur Elevated Highway; B31 Jalan Ampang

Location
- Country: Malaysia
- Districts: Ampang Jaya; Setiawangsa
- Municipalities: Ampang Jaya Municipal Council; Kuala Lumpur City Hall
- Primary destinations: Setiawangsa; Taman Keramat; Kampung Datuk Keramat

Highway system
- Highways in Malaysia; Expressways; Federal; State

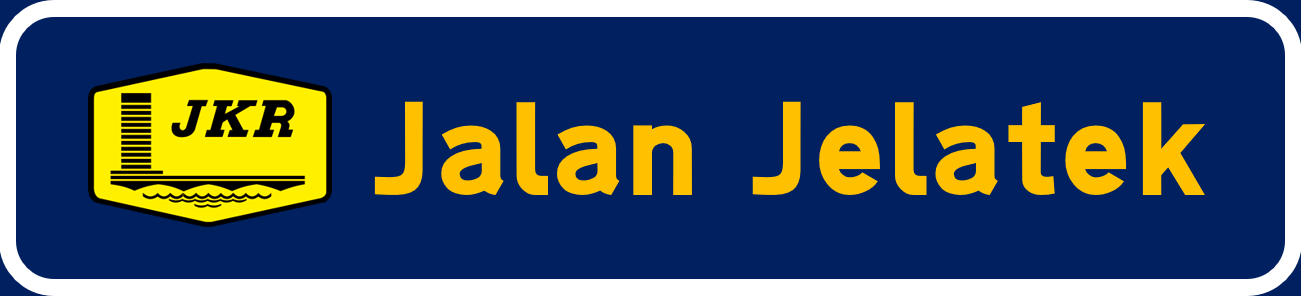
A road signage from the Malaysian Road Works Department for Jalan Jelatek.

Jalan Jelatek (formerly known as Jalan Setiawangsa) is a major road in Kuala Lumpur, Malaysia. It is located in the Setiawangsa area and is a significant artery in the city, serving as a primary transportation route for residents and commuters. It is often heavily congested during peak-hour traffic,

The full stretch of Jalan Jelatek.

Jalan Jelatek has a diverse range of residential, commercial, and retail properties. It is accessible to the Jelatek LRT station, and major arterial highways. The road runs through a developed area with various infrastructure and high-rise developments in close proximity. These include Datum Jelatek, Picasso Residence, 3rdNvenue, and Astrum Ampang.

== List of junctions ==
km	Exit	Junctions	To	Remarks
		Wangsa Maju	North; Jalan Mohd Yatim Yahaya (Jalan 54/26); Sri Rampai LRT station Jalan 34/26 West; Section—until -- PKNS Industrial Area; Setapak East; Section—until -- AEON BiG Wangsa Maju	Junctions
		Setiawangsa-DUKE	Duta–Ulu Klang Expressway; Duta–Sentul Pasar–Ulu Klang Link (Main Link); West; Ipoh; Gombak; Batu Caves; Kuantan; Seremban; KLCC; City Centre; Bulatan Pahang; Sentul East; Ulu Kelang; Ampang; Cheras	3-tier stacked interchange
		Muadz bin Jabal Mosque		
		Setiawangsa	West; Jalan Abdul Rashid; Desa Tun Hussein Onn East; Jalan Taman Setiawangsa; AU—until AU -- Ulu Klang	Junctions
		P&R Setiawangsa LRT station	Setiawangsa LRT station 5	
Federal Territory of Kuala Lumpur; DBKL border limit
Selangor–FT Kuala Lumpur border
Selangor Darul Ehsan; Gombak district border MPAJ border limit
Selangor Darul Ehsan; Gombak district border MPAJ border limit
FT Kuala Lumpur–Selangor border
Federal Territory of Kuala Lumpur; DBKL border limit
		Taman Keramat	East; Jalan Enggang; Taman Keramat	Junctions
		Kampung Datuk Keramat	Jalan Keramat	No entry
		P&R Jelatek LRT station	Jelatek LRT station 5	
		Kampung Datuk Keramat	West; Jalan Datuk Keramat; Kampung Datuk Keramat	Junctions
		Jelatek-AKLEH	Ampang–Kuala Lumpur Elevated Highway; West; City centre Kuala Lumpur City Centre; Jalan Ampang; Jalan Tun Razak (MRR1)	From/to west only
		Jalan Ampang	B31 Jalan Ampang West; City Centre; Kuala Lumpur City Centre; Jalan Tun Razak (MRR1) East; Ampang; Ulu Kelang	T-junctions
