= Duta–Ulu Klang Expressway =

Road in Malaysia

Expressway 33
- Duta–Ulu Klang Expressway
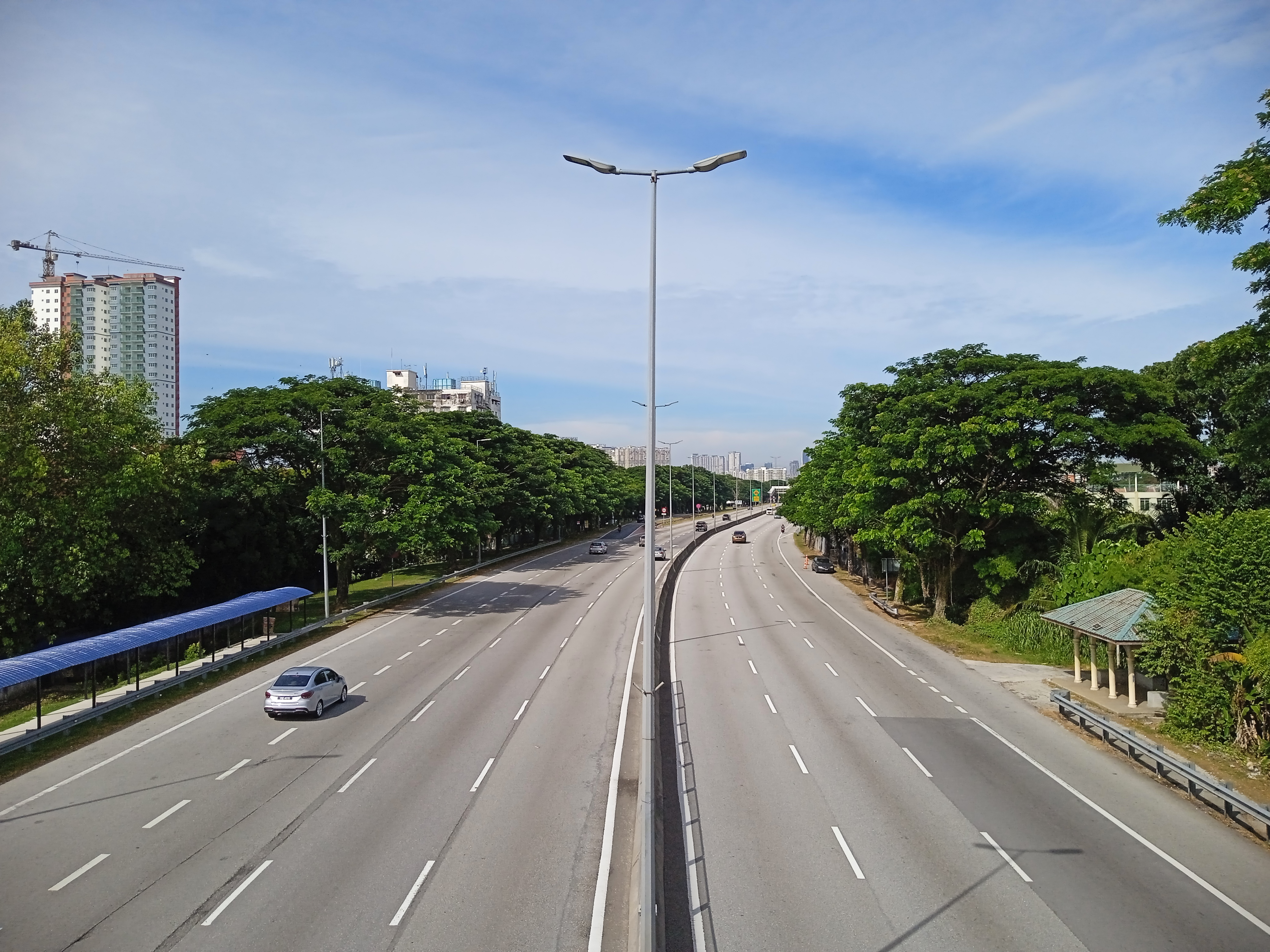

Route information
- Part of AH141 (Jalan Duta–Sentul Pasar–Greenwood stretch)
- Maintained by Konsortium Lebuhraya Utara-Timur (Kuala Lumpur) Sdn Bhd (Kesturi)
- Length: 18 km (11 mi)
- Existed: 2005–present
- History: Completed in 2009
- Component highways: Main Link (Jalan Duta–Sentul Pasar–Ulu Klang); Karak Link (Taman Greenwood, Batu Caves-Sentul Pasar); Sri Damansara Link (Segambut–Sri Damansara, Sungai Buloh); Tun Razak Link (Bulatan Pahang, Kuala Lumpur–Sentul Pasar)

Major junctions
- From: Jalan Duta Interchange on New Klang Valley Expressway
- New Klang Valley Expressway / AH141; Sprint Expressway (Penchala Link); Segambut Bypass; FT 1 Kuala Lumpur–Rawang Highway; Jalan Sentul; FT 2 Genting Klang–Pahang Highway; FT 2 Jalan Kampung Bandar Dalam; Jalan Sultan Yahya Petra (Jalan Semarak); Jalan Jelatek; Jalan 37/66 FT 28 / FT 2 / AH141 Kuala Lumpur Middle Ring Road 2 Damansara–Puchong Expressway
- To: Taman Hillview Interchange near Ulu Klang on Kuala Lumpur Middle Ring Road 2

Location
- Country: Malaysia
- Primary destinations: Jalan Duta, Segambut, Sentul, Setapak Setiawangsa, Ulu Klang

Highway system
- Highways in Malaysia; Expressways; Federal; State

Duta–Ulu Klang Expressway (DUKE, E33), is the main expressway network in Klang Valley, Malaysia. The 18 km (11 mi) expressway connects New Klang Valley Expressway's Jalan Duta Interchange (E1) to Taman Hillview Interchange on Kuala Lumpur Middle Ring Road 2 28 in Ulu Klang. The expressway was constructed to provide the "missing link" between New Klang Valley Expressway (E1), Kuala Lumpur–Karak Expressway (E8), and Kuala Lumpur Middle Ring Road 2 (JKR28). This expressway is also known as the Kuala Lumpur Northeast Dispersal Link Scheme. It was proposed by Tan Sri Datuk Lim Kang Hoo, a chairman of Ekovest Berhad.

It originally was given route code E16 but later changed to E33 instead. In addition to improving connectivity, DUKE disperses traffic from the city to the suburban range through several routes in and out of several branches of the main intersection. Through DUKE, drivers can move from one part to other parts of Kuala Lumpur in a short time, by bypassing congested traffic areas, such as Kuala Lumpur Middle Ring Road 1 and Kuala Lumpur Inner Ring Road.

== Route background ==
=== Duta–Sentul Pasar–Ulu Klang sections ===
The Kilometre Zero of this section is located at Jalan Duta Interchange near Jalan Duta, Kuala Lumpur, at its interchange with the E1 New Klang Valley Expressway.

=== Greenwood–Sentul Pasar sections ===
The Kilometre Zero of this section is located at Sentul Pasar Interchange. At Bandar Dalam Interchange the expressway overlaps with the Federal Route 2 from Bandar Dalam Interchange to Greenwood Interchange.

== History ==
The expressway used to be known as the Kuala Lumpur North East Expressway (KLNEE). It is a main element in the Kuala Lumpur Structure Plan 2020 as specified in the Transportation Research of the Japan International Cooperation Agency (JICA) conducted by the Kuala Lumpur City Hall (Dewan Bandaraya Kuala Lumpur) (DBKL) in 1985. It was identified by DBKL as one of the main connecting routes to complete the Kuala Lumpur Structure Plan 2020. DBKL conducted a detailed study of the alignment that feed the next three years, including Environmental Impact Assessment and Public Opinion. These studies and reports were approved by the Concession Agreement signed with the Federal Government on 12 August 2004.

The construction of this expressway commenced in late 2005. The Jalan Duta–DUKE Interchange was built at the sharp hairpin of the NKVE and the Jalan Kuching Interchange was built at the former Jalan Kuching Toll Plaza owned by Kamunting Corporation Berhad. The expressway was partially (2/3) opened officially by the Minister of Works Ir Mohd Zin Mohamed on 9 January 2009. Three months later, the NKVE section was open to traffic on 30 April 2009. Built to accommodate 120,000 vehicles per day, this expressway will offer an attractive alternative route to Klang Valley residents, especially for those traveling from east to west and for those who want to go to the city centre.

=== Progress ===
Construction progress gallery

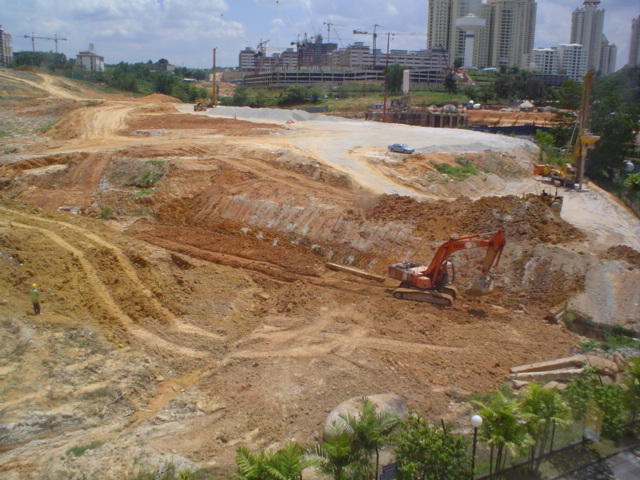
Progress photo taken at Duta Interchange Feb 2006

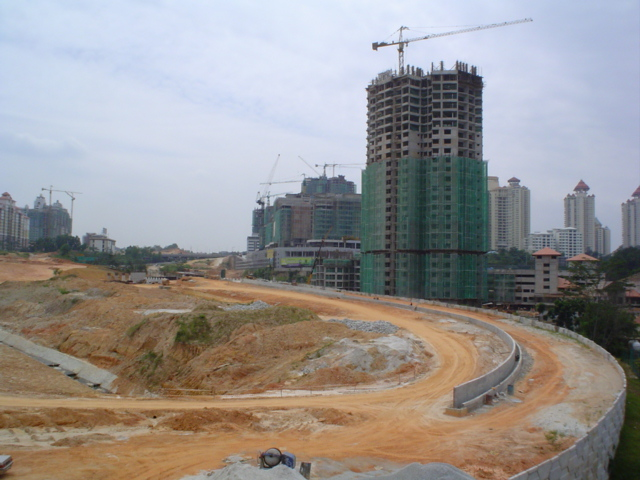
Progress photo taken at Duta Interchange Feb 2007

== Developments ==
Duta–Ulu Klang Expressway
- DUKE Extension Expressway
- Length: 9 km (5.6 mi)
- Existed: 2015–present
- History: Completed in 2017

=== DUKE Extension Expressway Project ===
The phase two development of the DUKE will be built by Ekovest Bhd and will start in two weeks at a construction cost of RM1.183 billion. Phase two, which will entail the construction of an elevated highway that will complement the existing DUKE, was to be completed in 2015. The DUKE extension will comprise two additional links, namely the Sri Damansara Link and the Tun Razak Link. Both links are proposed to have dual carriageways and the Tun Razak link will be about 9 kilometres in length while the Sri Damansara Link will be 7 kilometres long. The expressway will serve as a link between the Kuala Lumpur Middle Ring Road 1 (MRR1) and Kuala Lumpur Middle Ring Road 2 MRR2.

The DUKE Extension Expressway (E33) is an expressway in Kuala Lumpur, Malaysia connecting Sentul Pasar Interchange on the Duta-Ulu Klang Expressway to the Genting Klang–Pahang Highway.

==== History ====
The phase two development of the DUKE will be built by Ekovest Bhd and will start in two weeks at a construction cost of RM1.183 billion. Phase two, which will entail the construction of an elevated highway that will complement the existing DUKE, was to be completed in 2015. The DUKE extension will comprise two additional links, namely the Sri Damansara Link and the Tun Razak Link. Both links are proposed to have dual carriageways and the Tun Razak link will be about 9 kilometres in length while the Sri Damansara Link will be 7 kilometres long. The expressway will serve as a link between the Kuala Lumpur Middle Ring Road 1 (MRR1) and Kuala Lumpur Middle Ring Road 2 MRR2. This 9 kilometre and 7 kilometre segment was opened to traffic on 28 September 2017 and 23 October 2017.

== Features ==
- Flyovers passing Segambut, Sentul and Setapak town.
- Sentul flyover sections with 132kv of Tenaga Nasional Berhad's (TNB) transmmision line (National Grid). During construction on 2007, the Cabinet directed the concessionaire Konsortium Lebuhraya Utara-Timur (KL) Sdn Bhd to share the TNB reserve in order to reduced land acquisition costs. In order to do this, the existing high tension pylons were replaced with monopoles, with the expressway running either side.

== Tolls ==
The DUKE highway adopts open toll system on all its toll plazas (namely Batu, Sentul Pasar, Ayer Panas).

As part of an initiative to facilitate faster transaction, all toll transactions are conducted electronically via Touch 'n Go cards, VISA/Mastercard bank cards, SmartTAGs or RFID tags starting January 2018. Cash payment is only accepted under very niche circumstances..

Touch 'n Go Self-Service Kiosk (SSK) is available at Batu & Ayer Panas Toll Plaza lay-by.

=== DUKE Extension ===
The DUKE Extension Expressway uses an open toll system.

Sentul Pasar & Segambut toll plazas have fully Electronic Toll Collections (ETC). As part of an initiative to facilitate faster transaction at the Sentul Pasar & Segambut Toll Plazas, all toll transactions at two toll plazas on the DUKE are conducted electronically via Touch 'n Go cards, SmartTAGs or RFID tags starting January 2018.

=== Toll rates ===
(Starting 23 November 2017)

Class	Type of vehicles	Rate (in Malaysian Ringgit (RM))
0	Motorcycles, bicycles or vehicles with 2 or less wheels	Free
1	Vehicles with 2 axles and 3 or 4 wheels excluding taxis	RM 2.50
2	Vehicles with 2 axles and 5 or 6 wheels excluding buses	RM 3.80
3	Vehicles with 3 or more axles	RM 5.00
4	Taxis	RM 1.30
5	Buses	RM 1.30

Note: Toll charges can only be paid with the Touch 'n Go cards, VISA/Mastercard bank cards, SmartTAGs or RFID tags. Cash payment is not accepted.

=== Toll names ===
Abbreviation	Name
BTU	Batu/Batu Tambahan
APS	Ayer Panas
STL	Sentul/Sentul Tambahan
SGT	Segambut

== Interchange lists ==
Legend:

- I/C - Interchange, I/S - Intersection, RSA - Rest and service area, OBR - Overhead bridge restaurant, R/R - Restaurant and rest plaza, L/B - Layby, V/P - Vista point, TN - tunnel, T/P - Toll plaza, BR - Bridge
- C - Cloverleaf, S - Stack, T-A - Trumpet-A, T-B - Trumpet-B, DT - Directional-T/Y, SDT - Semi-Directional-T/Y, P-Y - Partial-Y, D - Diamond, P-C - Partial cloverleaf, D-D - Diverging diamond, D-R - Direct ramp

=== Phase 1 ===
==== Duta–Sentul Pasar–Ulu Klang sections (Main Link) ====
States	District	Km	Exit	Interchange	Destinations	Notes
Through to New Klang Valley Expressway / AH141
Kuala Lumpur		0.0	3301	Jalan Duta I/C	New Klang Valley Expressway – Jalan Tuanku Abdul Halim (Jalan Duta), City Centre; From New Klang Valley Expressway West Only; Sprint Expressway, Penchala Link – Mont Kiara, Sri Hartamas, Petaling Jaya; Damansara–Shah Alam Elevated Expressway - Puncak Alam, Meru, Subang Airport, Kota Damansara; Persiaran Dutamas (proposal) – Jalan Sultan Haji Ahmad Shah, Segambut, Mont Kiara, KL Metropolis	Trumpet interchange
Kuala Lumpur			3301A 3301B	Segambut flyover Sungai Keroh bridge Road-Railway crossing stacked bridge Segambut I/C	3301A – Upper Flyover; Duta–Ulu Klang Expressway (Sri Damansara Link) – Segambut, Bandar Menjalara, Kepong; FT 54 Sungai Buloh Highway – Kuala Selangor; Damansara–Puchong Expressway – Desa Park City, Damansara; 3301B – Below Flyover Only; Segambut Bypass – Jalan Segambut, Jalan Sultan Azlan Shah, Jalan Ipoh, Jalan Sentul	Directional-T elevated interchange Ramp in/out
Kuala Lumpur			3302	Jalan Kuching I/C	FT 1 Kuala Lumpur–Rawang Highway – Ipoh, Rawang, Kepong, Fraser's Hill, City Centre, Cheras, Seremban	Semi cloverleaf interchange
Kuala Lumpur			T/P	Batu Tambahan Toll Plaza	Touch 'n Go Touch 'n Go SmartTAG SmartTAG MyRFID MyRFID	Eastbound to Bamboo Hills
Kuala Lumpur				Jalan Ipoh Ramp	Jalan Ipoh – Bamboo Hills @ KL Digital City, Batu Kentonmen Army Camp, Kepong	Exit/Entrance ramp via toll plaza
Kuala Lumpur			T/P	Batu Toll Plaza	Touch 'n Go Touch 'n Go SmartTAG SmartTAG MyRFID MyRFID	Westbound
Kuala Lumpur			BR	Sentul flyover 132 kv of TNB transmission line (National Grid); 500m Railway crossing bridge Sungai Batu bridge		High voltage transmission line on the flyover
Kuala Lumpur				Sentul flyover Jalan Sentul Ramp	Jalan Sentul (No Entry)	Ramp in
Kuala Lumpur			3303	Sentul Pasar I/C	Duta–Ulu Klang Expressway / FT 2 / AH141 Greenwood–Sentul Pasar Link (Karak Link) – Gombak, Sentul, Taman Greenwood; FT 28 Kuala Lumpur Middle Ring Road 2 – Batu Caves, Kepong, Selayang Kuala Lumpur–Karak Expressway / FT 2 / AH141 – Genting Highlands, Kuantan, Kuala Terengganu; Duta–Ulu Klang Expressway (Tun Razak Link) – KLCC, City Centre, Kampung Baru; North–South Expressway Southern Route – Seremban	Y-interchange Elevated u-turn interchange
Kuala Lumpur			BR	Setapak flyover Jalan Pahang Ramp; Sungai Gombak bridge	FT 2 Genting Klang–Pahang Highway (Jalan Pahang) (No Entry)	Ramp in
Kuala Lumpur			T/P	Ayer Panas Toll Plaza	Touch 'n Go Touch 'n Go SmartTAG SmartTAG MyRFID MyRFID	Eastbound
Kuala Lumpur			3304	Ayer Jernih–Semarak flyover Ayer Jernih Ramp	Setapak, City Centre	Ramp in/out
Kuala Lumpur			3305	Ayer Jernih–Semarak flyover Semarak I/C	Jalan Sultan Yahya Petra (Jalan Semarak) – City Centre, Kampung Baru, PULAPOL	Half diamond interchange
Kuala Lumpur			3306A 3306B 3306C	Setiawangsa I/C	Jalan Jelatek – Wangsa Maju, Taman Sri Rampai, Danau Kota, Setiawangsa, Jalan Ampang; Setiawangsa–Pantai Expressway – Kampung Pandan, Bandar Malaysia, Taman Melati, Genting Kelang, Kepong	3-tier stacked interchange
Selangor	Gombak		3307	Hilview flyover Jalan 37/66 Ramp	Jalan 37/66 – Taman Melawati; Jalan Taman Setiawangsa – Taman Setiawangsa, Taman Keramat	Roundabout interchange
Selangor	Gombak		BR	Hilview flyover Sungai Klang bridge		
Selangor	Gombak		3308A 3308B	Hilview flyover Taman Hillview I/C	FT 28 Kuala Lumpur Middle Ring Road 2 – Ulu Klang, Taman Melawati, Taman Melati, Taman Permata, Ampang, Pandan Indah, Cheras, Sungai Besi; East Klang Valley Expressway – Hulu Langat, Bandar Mahkota Cheras, Kajang East Coast Expressway / FT 2 / AH141 – Genting Highlands, Kuantan; Shah Alam Expressway – Puchong, Shah Alam; Sungai Besi–Ulu Klang Elevated Expressway – Ampang, Hulu Langat, Cheras; North–South Expressway Southern Route / AH2 – Kuala Lumpur International Airport, Seremban, Malacca, Johor Bahru	Stacked interchange

==== Greenwood–Sentul Pasar sections (Karak Link) ====
States	District	Km	Exit	Interchange	Destinations	Notes
Kuala Lumpur		0.0 (K)	3303A	Sentul Pasar I/C	Duta–Ulu Klang Expressway (Duta–Sentul Pasar–Ulu Klang Link, Main Link) – Ipoh, Petaling Jaya, Segambut, Kepong, Sentul, Kuala Lumpur city centre, Jalan Sultan Yahya Petra (Jalan Semarak), Setiawangsa, Ulu Klang, Ampang; Duta–Ulu Klang Expressway (Extension, U-Turn Only) – Seremban, KLCC, City Centre, Bulatan Pahang, Sentul	Y-interchange Elevated u-turn interchange
Kuala Lumpur			T/P	Sentul Toll Plaza	Touch 'n Go Touch 'n Go SmartTAG MyRFID MyRFID MyRFID MyRFID SmartTAG SmartTAG Touch 'n Go Touch 'n Go	
Kuala Lumpur			3303B	Sentul Pasar I/C	Duta–Ulu Klang Expressway (Extension, to east only) – Jalan Gombak – Gombak, Setapak	From exit only
Kuala Lumpur			BR	Sungai Chubadak bridge		
Kuala Lumpur			3309	Jalan Kampung Bandar Dalam	FT 2 Jalan Kampung Bandar Dalam – Sentul, Batu, Gombak, Setapak	Diamond interchange
Kuala Lumpur			BR	Sungai Padang Balang bridge		
Selangor	Gombak		3310	Greenwood I/C	FT 28 Kuala Lumpur Middle Ring Road 2 – Batu Caves, Kepong, Rawang, Sungai Buloh, Kuala Selangor, Damansara, Petaling Jaya, Puchong; B22 Jalan Batu Caves – Gombak, Taman Greenwood	Directional ramp Stacked diamond interchange
Through to FT 28 / FT 2 / AH141 Kuala Lumpur Middle Ring Road 2

=== Phase 2 ===
The entire route is located in Kuala Lumpur.

==== Sri Damansara Link ====
Km	Exit	Interchange	Destinations	Notes
	3320	Segambut I/C	Duta–Ulu Klang Expressway Duta–Sentul Pasar–Ulu Klang Link (Main Link) – Gombak, Batu Caves, Ulu Klang, Ampang, Genting Highlands, Kuantan, Sentul, Bulatan Pahang, City Centre, KLCC, Jalan Semarak, Setiawangsa, Seremban, Ipoh, Petaling Jaya; FT 1 Kuala Lumpur–Rawang Highway (North Only/U-Turn) – Rawang. Bandar Baru Selayang	Directional T with elevated u-turn interchange
	3321	Plaza Tol Segambut Exit	Jalan Lang Emas – Jalan Segambut, Segambut town centre, Taman Sri Bintang, Taman Sri Sinar	Interchange
	T/P	Segambut Toll Plaza	Touch 'n Go Touch 'n Go SmartTAGSmartTAG MyRFID MyRFID MyRFID MyRFID SmartTAG SmartTAG Touch 'n Go Touch 'n Go	
	3322	Jalan Burung Hantu Ramp	Jalan Burung Hantu – Kepong Baru, Kepong, Taman Bukit Maluri, Bandar Menjalara, Desa Park City	Ramp in/out
	3323A	Menjalara I/C	FT 28 FT 54 Kuala Lumpur Middle Ring Road 2 Persiaran Utama – Bandar Sri Damansara, Kepong Industrial Area; Damansara–Puchong Expressway – Desa Park City, Damansara, Petaling Jaya, Puchong, Putrajaya	From directional ramp interchange
	3323B	Menjalara I/C	FT 28 FT 54 Kuala Lumpur Middle Ring Road 2 – Kepong, Selayang, Rawang, Batu Caves, Genting Highlands, Kuantan; FT 54 Sungai Buloh Highway – Bandar Sri Damansara, Sungai Buloh, Puncak Alam, Kuala Selangor; North–South Expressway Northern Route / AH2 – Ipoh, Klang, Kuala Lumpur International Airport (KLIA), Johor Bahru	Elevated directional ramp interchange with u-turn from FT28/FT54 MRR2 & Main Link

==== Sentul Pasar–Jalan Gombak Link ====
Km	Exit	Interchange	Destinations	Notes
	3303	Sentul Pasar I/C	Duta–Ulu Klang Expressway Duta–Sentul Pasar–Ulu Klang Link (Main Link) – Ipoh, Petaling Jaya, Segambut, Kepong, Sentul, Kuala Lumpur city centre, Jalan Sultan Yahya Petra (Jalan Semarak), Setiawangsa, Ulu Klang, Ampang	Y-elevated interchange with u-turn to Main Link
	BR	Sungai Gombak bridge		
	3351	Jalan Gombak I/C	FT 2 FT 68 Jalan Gombak – Sentul, Batu Caves, Gombak, Wisma Ekovest, Genting Highlands, Bentong, Kuantan; FT 2 Genting Klang–Pahang Highway – Setapak town centre, Jalan Genting Klang, Klang Gates, Ulu Klang; Jalan Pahang – Sentul, City Centre, Seremban, Petaling Jaya	Tunnel trumpet interchange

==== Tun Razak Link ====
Km	Exit	Interchange	Destinations	Notes
Through to Duta–Ulu Klang Expressway / FT 2 / AH141 Greenwood–Sentul Pasar Link (Karak Link)
	T/P	Sentul Tambahan Toll Plaza	Touch 'n Go Touch 'n Go SmartTAGSmartTAG MyRFID MyRFID	Southbound
0.0 (K)	3305A 3305B	Sentul Pasar I/C	Duta–Ulu Klang Expressway / AH141 Duta–Sentul Pasar–Ulu Klang Link (Main Link) – Ipoh, Petaling Jaya, Segambut, Kepong, Sentul, Kuala Lumpur city centre Duta–Ulu Klang Expressway / FT 2 / AH141 Greenwood–Sentul Pasar Link (Karak Link) – Batu Caves, Gombak, Genting Highlands, Kuantan	Y-interchange; Directional ramp elevated u-turn interchange
	––	Jalan Gombak Link Ramp	Duta–Ulu Klang Expressway (Jalan Gombak Link); FT 2 FT 68 Jalan Gombak – Gombak; Jalan Genting Klang – Klang Gates; Jalan Pahang – Setapak	Southbound direction only
	BR	Sungai Gombak bridge		
	3305C	Bandar Baru Sentul Ramp	FT 2 Genting Klang–Pahang Highway; Jalan 9/48A – Jalan Sentul, Sentul town centre, Bandar Baru Sentul; Jalan Pahang – Setapak, Gombak	Ramp out from expressway
	3355A 3303D	Jalan Pahang I/C	FT 2 Genting Klang–Pahang Highway (Jalan Pahang) – Setapak, Gombak, Kuantan, Jalan Tuanku Abdul Rahman (Batu Road), Jalan Chow Kit (Chow Kit Road), City Centre, Kuala Lumpur Hospital; Kuala Lumpur Middle Ring Road 1 (Jalan Tun Razak) – Ipoh, Petaling Jaya, KLCC, Ampang, Seremban, Malacca, Johor Bahru	Roundabout interchange with one directional underpass to Ipoh and Petaling Jaya

== See also ==
- Sentul Raya
- Kuala Lumpur
