= Ampang–Kuala Lumpur Elevated Highway =

Expressway in Malaysia

Expressway 12
- Ampang–Kuala Lumpur Elevated Highway (AKLEH)
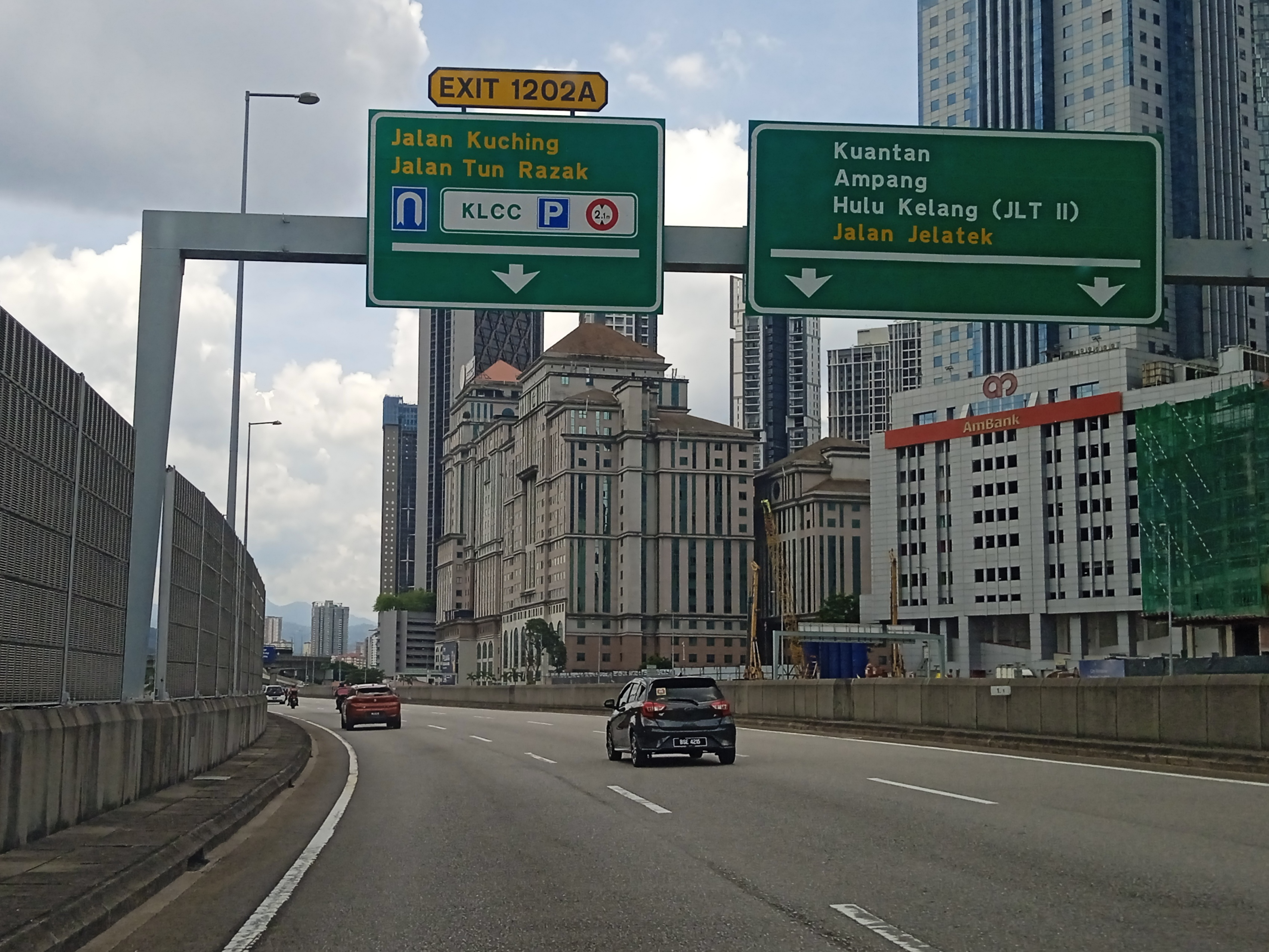

Route information
- Maintained by Prolintas
- Length: 7.9 km (4.9 mi)
- Existed: 1996–present
- History: Completed in 2000, opened in 2001

Major junctions
- West end: Jalan Sultan Ismail, Kuala Lumpur
- Kuala Lumpur Middle Ring Road 1 Setiawangsa–Pantai Expressway; FT 28 Kuala Lumpur Middle Ring Road 2 B36 Jalan Kerja Ayer Lama; B31 Jalan Ampang
- East end: Jalan Memanda, Ampang, Selangor

Location
- Country: Malaysia
- Primary destinations: Jalan Sultan Ismail, Jalan Tun Razak, Ulu Klang, Ampang

Highway system
- Highways in Malaysia; Expressways; Federal; State

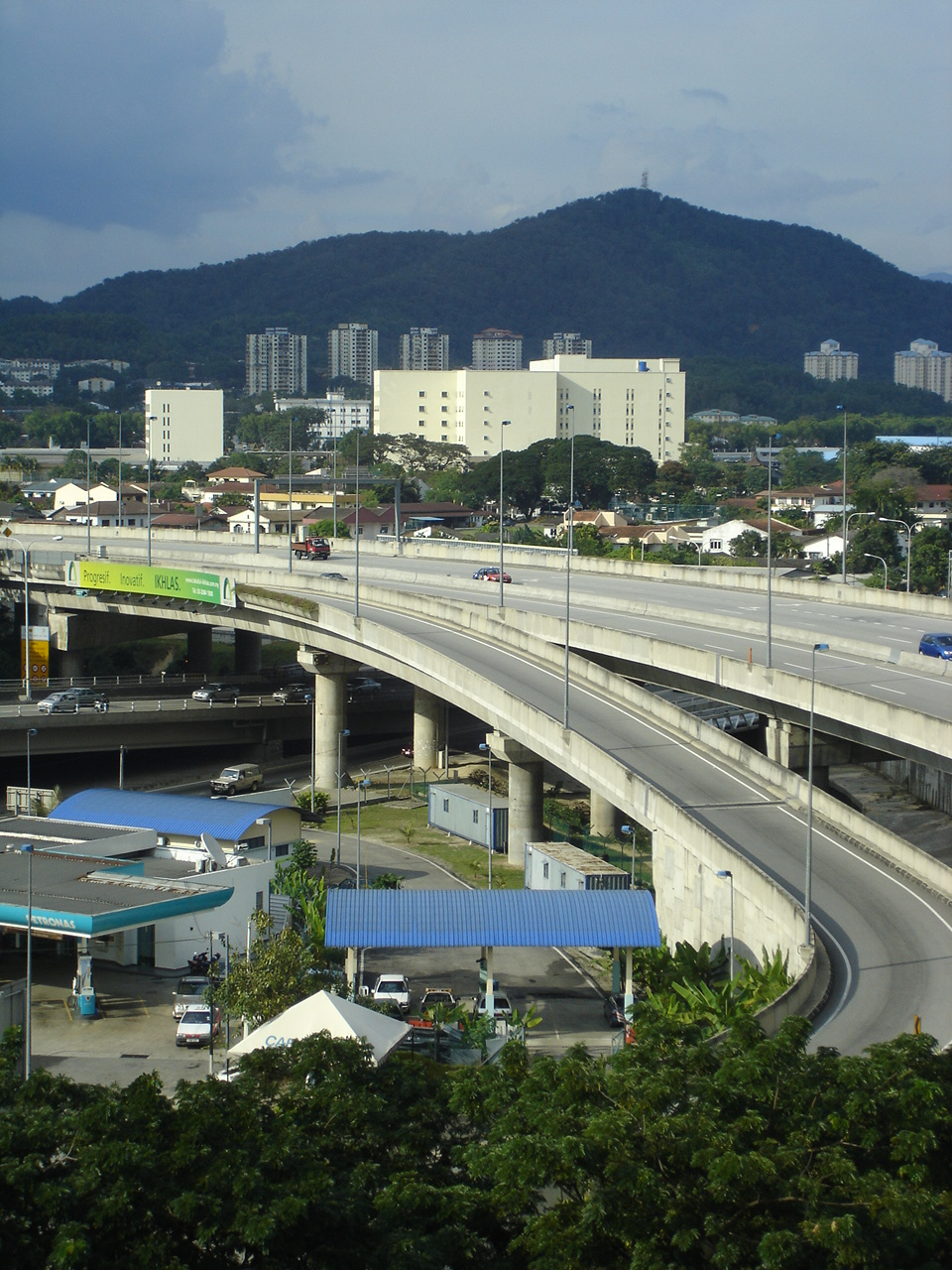
The highway's interchange with Kuala Lumpur Middle Ring Road 2 in Ampang

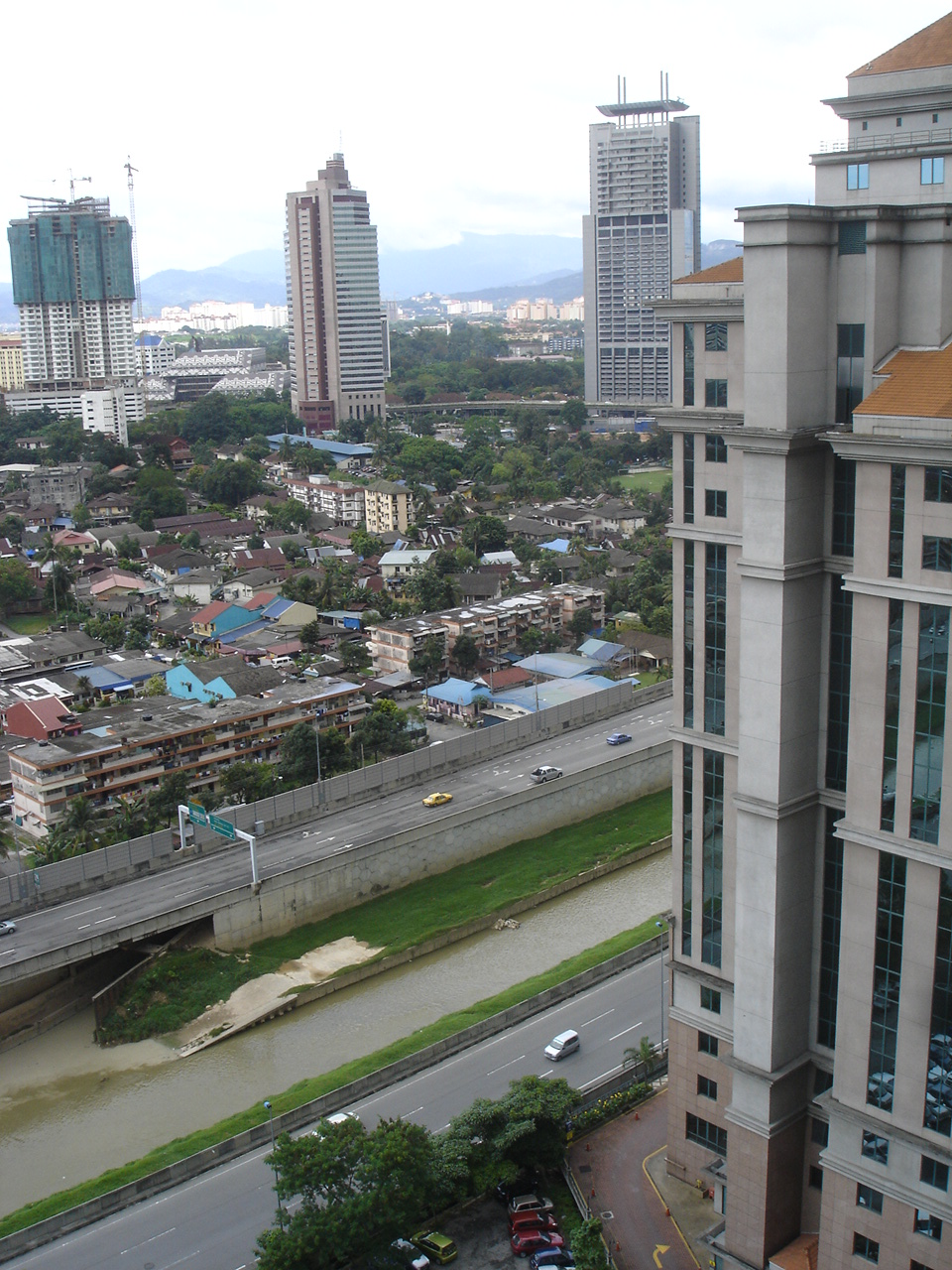
The Ampang–Kuala Lumpur Elevated Highway stretch between Jalan Tun Razak and Jalan Sultan Ismail exits with Kampung Baru in the background

E12 Ampang–Kuala Lumpur Elevated Highway (AKLEH), (Malay: Lebuhraya Bertingkat Ampang–Kuala Lumpur; Chinese: 安邦–吉隆坡高架大道), is the first elevated highway in Malaysia. The 7.9 km (4.9 mi) elevated highway connects Ampang (in Selangor state) and Kuala Lumpur. This highway was built to reduce traffic congestion at Jalan Ampang and make access to the city more convenient. Motorcycles and other vehicles with two wheels were banned from using this highway for safety reasons; the ban on motorcycles was lifted on 19 June 2008 because of escalating fuel prices.

== Route background ==
The Kilometre Zero is located at the entrance from Jalan Raja Abdullah at Jalan Sultan Ismail Interchange, Kuala Lumpur.

== History ==
The construction of the Ampang–Kuala Lumpur Elevated Highway was approved on 16 May 1996 when Prolintas was awarded the concession of the highway, which will end in 2029. Construction began in the same year at the banks of the Klang River and was completed in 2001. The highway opened to traffic on 17 May 2001 after numerous delays, and the toll collection started on 1 June 2001.

=== Plans ===
The highway was designed to accommodate future expansion of the Jelatek–Kuala Lumpur Middle Ring Road 2 section from the current four-lane carriageway to six-lane carriageways. The expansion will take place along the northern bank of the Klang River and Ampang River. According to the concessionaire agreement between Prolintas and the federal government, Prolintas is required to expand the highway once the average daily traffic exceeds 93,000 vehicles. As a result, a chicane was formed right after the Exit 1203 Jelatek Interchange for Ampang-bound traffic. Prolintas will only be allowed to raise the toll rate once the upgrading works of the Jelatek–MRR2 section to six-lane carriageway begins.

On 5 November 2015, the upgrading works (called AKLEH Phase 2) of the AKLEH (Ampang-bound traffic) from Dato' Keramat to Ampang-MRR2 was opened to traffic.

== Features ==
- Tunnel to Suria KLCC parking
- Smooth access to Ampang and Kuala Lumpur
- Spectacular scenery of Kuala Lumpur skyline from Ampang
- Driving view of Saloma Bridge
- Parallel with Jalan Ampang

== Tolls ==
The Ampang–Kuala Lumpur Elevated Highway (AKLEH) uses open toll collection systems. Since 2015 all toll transactions at the highway's sole toll plaza have been conducted electronically via Touch 'n Go cards, SmartTAGs or MyRFID. Cash payments are no longer accepted. In October 2022, it was one of the four expressways maintained by PROLINTAS to have its toll rates deducted between 8% and 15%.

=== Toll rates ===
(Starting 20 October 2022)

Class	Type of vehicles	Rate (in Malaysian Ringgit (RM))
0	Motorcycles	Free
1	Vehicles with 2 axles and 3 or 4 wheels excluding taxis	RM 2.13
2	Vehicles with 2 axles and 5 or 6 wheels excluding buses	RM 7.00
3	Vehicles with 3 or more axles	RM 10.50
4	Taxis	RM 1.53
5	Buses	RM 1.28

=== Toll name ===
There is only one toll in AKLEH.

Abbreviation	Name
KER	Dato' Keramat

== Junction lists ==
Legend:

- I/C - Interchange, I/S - Intersection, RSA - Rest and service area, OBR - Overhead bridge restaurant, R/R - Restaurant and rest plaza, L/B - Layby, V/P - Vista point, TN - tunnel, T/P - Toll plaza, BR - Bridge
- C - Cloverleaf, S - Stack, T-A - Trumpet-A, T-B - Trumpet-B, DT - Directional-T/Y, SDT - Semi-Directional-T/Y, P-Y - Partial-Y, D - Diamond, P-C - Partial cloverleaf, D-D - Diverging diamond, D-R - Direct ramp

State/territory	District	Location	km	mi	Exit	Name	Destinations	Notes
Kuala Lumpur	Bukit Bintang	Jalan Sultan Ismail	0.0	0.0		Jalan Raja Abdullah Ramp		Enter only
Kuala Lumpur	Bukit Bintang	Jalan Sultan Ismail	0.0	0.0	1201A	Jalan Sultan Ismail I/C	B31 Jalan Ampang – Jalan Sultan Ismail (KLIRR)	Exit only
Kuala Lumpur	Bukit Bintang	Jalan Sultan Ismail			1201B	Jalan Sultan Ismail I/C	Kuala Lumpur Inner Ring Road (Jalan Sultan Ismail (Jalan Treacher)) – Jalan P. Ramlee (Jalan Parry), Jalan Raja Chulan (Jalan Weld), Jalan Bukit Bintang, Jalan Imbi	Interchange with KL Monorail truss girder bridge From/to Ampang only
Kuala Lumpur	Bukit Bintang	KLCC				KLCC Car Park	KLCC Car Park (tunnel) – Suria KLCC, Petronas Twin Towers	Westbound only
Kuala Lumpur	Bukit Bintang	Jalan Tun Razak			1202A	Jalan Tun Razak I/C	Kuala Lumpur Middle Ring Road 1 (Jalan Tun Razak (Jalan Pekeliling)) – Jalan Sultan Yahya Petra (Jalan Semarak), Jalan Raja Muda Abdul Aziz (Princes Road), Sentul, Petaling Jaya	Interchange
Kuala Lumpur	Bukit Bintang	Jalan Tun Razak			1202B	Jalan Tun Razak I/C	Kuala Lumpur Middle Ring Road 1 (Jalan Tun Razak (Jalan Pekeliling)) – Jalan Yap Kwan Seng, B31 Jalan Ampang, Cheras, Seremban, Johor Bahru	Interchange
Kuala Lumpur	Setiawangsa	Kampung Datuk Keramat			Dato' Keramat Toll Plaza			
Kuala Lumpur	Setiawangsa	Kampung Datuk Keramat			1203	Dato' Keramat I/C	Jalan Jelatek – Kampung Datuk Keramat, Setiawangsa, Wangsa Maju, Setapak, Seri Maya Condominium	Interchange; From/to Kuala Lumpur only
Kuala Lumpur	Setiawangsa	Kampung Datuk Keramat			1203A	SPE I/C	Setiawangsa–Pantai Expressway – Taman Melati, Setiawangsa, Kampung Pandan, Bandar Malaysia	From/to Kuala Lumpur only
Selangor	Hulu Langat	Ampang Jaya			Sungai Klang bridge (Ampang bound)			
Selangor	Hulu Langat	Ampang Jaya			1204A	Ampang-MRR2 I/C	FT 28 Kuala Lumpur Middle Ring Road 2 – Ulu Klang, Taman Melawati, Gombak, Genting Highlands, Kuantan	Interchange; From/to Kuala Lumpur only
Selangor	Hulu Langat	Ampang Jaya			1204B	Jalan Kerja Ayer Lama I/C	B36 Jalan Kerja Ayer Lama – Taman Tun Razak, Kelab Darul Ehsan	Ramp off
Selangor	Hulu Langat	Ampang Jaya			1204C	SUKE (South) I/C	Sungai Besi–Ulu Klang Elevated Expressway – Kosas, Permai, Hulu Langat, Cheras, Kajang	Interchange; From/to Kuala Lumpur only
Selangor	Hulu Langat	Ampang Jaya			1206	Jalan Memanda I/C	Jalan Memanda – Pekan Ampang, Ampang Putri Specialist Hospital; B31 Jalan Ampang – Lembah Jaya, Hulu Langat, Pandan Indah	
1.000 mi = 1.609 km; 1.000 km = 0.621 mi: Electronic toll collection; Incomplete access

== See also ==
- Jalan Ampang
