= Taman Keramat =

Township in Gombak, Selangor, Malaysia

Keramat
- Township
- Taman Keramat
- Keramat in Selangor, Malay Peninsular and Malaysia Keramat (Peninsular Malaysia) Keramat (Malaysia)
- Coordinates: 3°11′6″N 101°44′9″E
- Country: Malaysia
- State: Selangor
- District: Gombak
- Time zone: UTC+8 (MYT)
- Postal code: 54200

Taman Keramat is a township in Ulu Klang, Selangor, Malaysia. This township is located between Kampung Datuk Keramat, Keramat Wangsa and Setiawangsa in Kuala Lumpur side. Keramat is served by two light rail transit stations (the Jelatek and Setiawangsa stations) as part of the Kelana Jaya Line.

Taman Keramat is divided into 5 areas, which is:

- Taman Lembah Keramat (AU5)
- Taman Keramat Tengah (AU4)
- Taman Desa Keramat (AU3)
- Taman Keramat AU2
- Taman Keramat Permai (AU1)
