= Setiawangsa–Pantai Expressway =

Road in Malaysia

Expressway 39
- Setiawangsa–Pantai Expressway (SPE); Lebuhraya Setiawangsa–Pantai 斯迪亚旺沙—班底大道
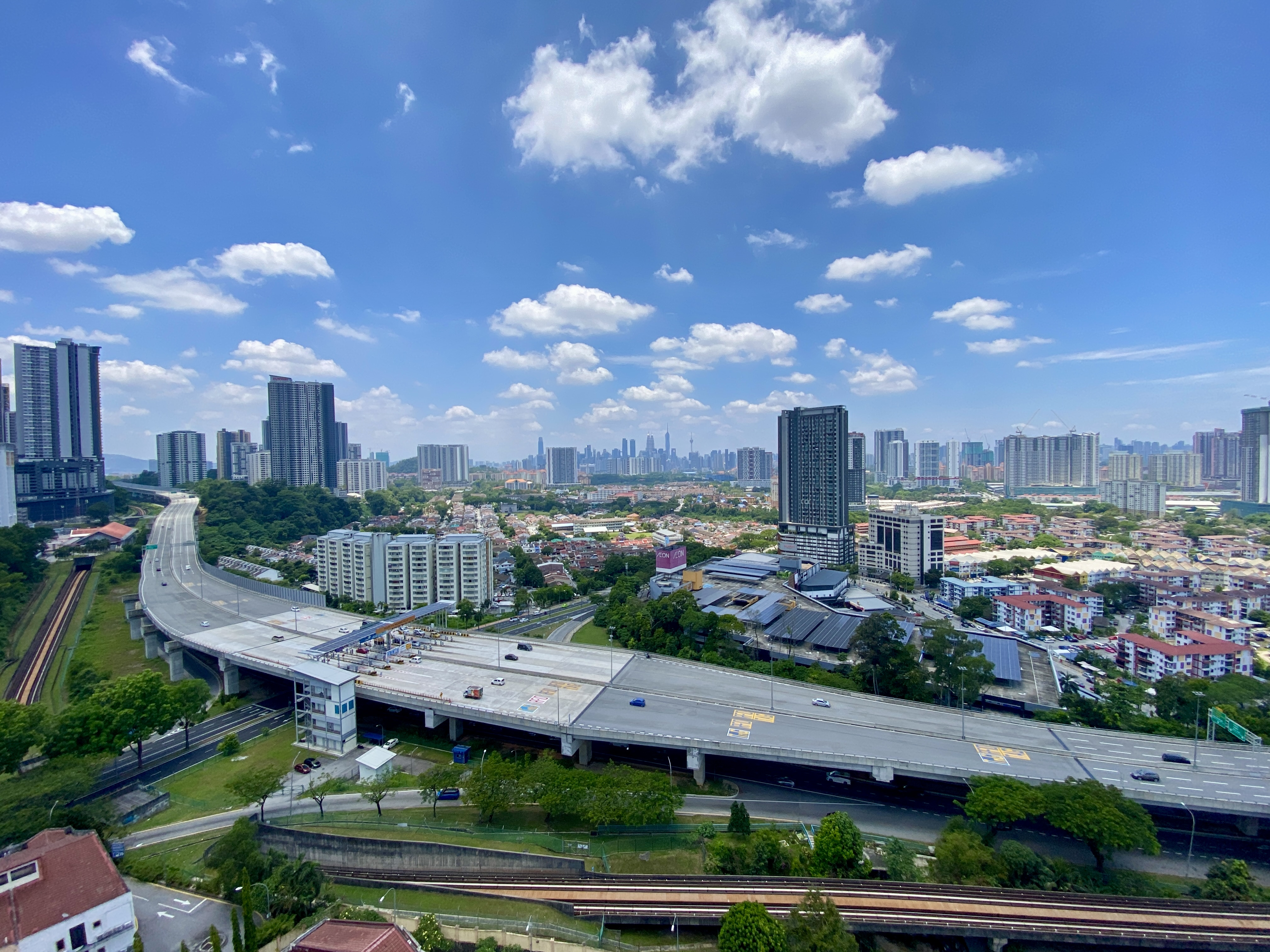
- SPE's elevated Wangsa Maju Toll Plaza in Wangsa Maju, Kuala Lumpur, and view of the expressway to the east towards Setiawangsa

Route information
- Maintained by Ekovest Berhad
- Length: 29.8 km (18.5 mi)
- Existed: 2016–present
- History: Opened in stages –Section 4: 22 December 2021 (Wangsa Maju-Setiawangsa) –Section 1 to 3: 4 November 2023 (Kerinchi-Wangsa Maju)

Major junctions
- From: FT 28 Kuala Lumpur Middle Ring Road 2
- FT 2 Genting Klang–Pahang Highway; Jalan Setiawangsa; Jalan Ampang; Jalan Kampung Pandan; East–West Link Expressway
- To: Sprint Expressway (Kerinchi Link) and FT 2 Federal Highway

Location
- Country: Malaysia
- Primary destinations: Gombak, Taman Melati, Genting Klang, Setiawangsa, Wangsa Maju, Ampang, Kampung Pandan, Bandar Malaysia, Kerinchi, Pantai

Highway system
- Highways in Malaysia; Expressways; Federal; State

Setiawangsa–Pantai Expressway (SPE) is a 29.8-kilometre (18.5 mi) expressway in Klang Valley, Malaysia that connects Taman Melati and Klang Gates from FT 28 Kuala Lumpur Middle Ring Road 2 to Sprint Expressway - Kerinchi Link and FT 2 Federal Highway at Kerinchi near Pantai and University of Malaya. The alignment of this highway traverses from the north to the south of Kuala Lumpur and serves areas such as Tunku Abdul Rahman University of Management and Technology, Wangsa Maju, Setiawangsa, Ampang, the Tun Razak Exchange and Bandar Malaysia development corridor as well as providing a connection to Kuala Lumpur-Karak Experessay to the east coast. It was built and maintained by Ekovest Berhad. It was formerly known as DUKE Phase 3.

== Route background ==
Most sections of this expressway are elevated. It has seven interchanges and a few toll plazas which are all elevated as well. It is a dual-two carriageway with six and four lanes (three or two lanes on either direction) without an emergency lane. It is constructed according to JKR R6 design standards being defined in the Arahan Teknik 8/86: A Guide on Geometric Design of Roads (controlled-access expressway with design speed limit of 120 kilometres per hour [75 mph] and a lane width of 3.56 metres [11.7 ft]).

== History ==
It is formerly known as DUKE Phase 3, Duta–Ulu Klang Expressway and a part of the DUKE Extension Expressway Project but upon construction it is changed to a different name and uses Setiawangsa–Pantai Expressway instead. On 12 April 2021, the expressway has been given a title on the Malaysia Book Of Records for two categories, which are the longest prestressed T-shaped concrete bridge and longest T-shaped prestressed concrete beam. There are 424 BH beams used, and the longest bridge that used the BH Girder is 67.5 meters long.

On 22 December 2021, Section 4 of the road (Taman Melati to Setiawangsa) was opened to the public. The rest of the highway (Sections 1-3) of the road (Kerinchi to Wangsa Maju) was opened on 3 November 2023.

== Features ==
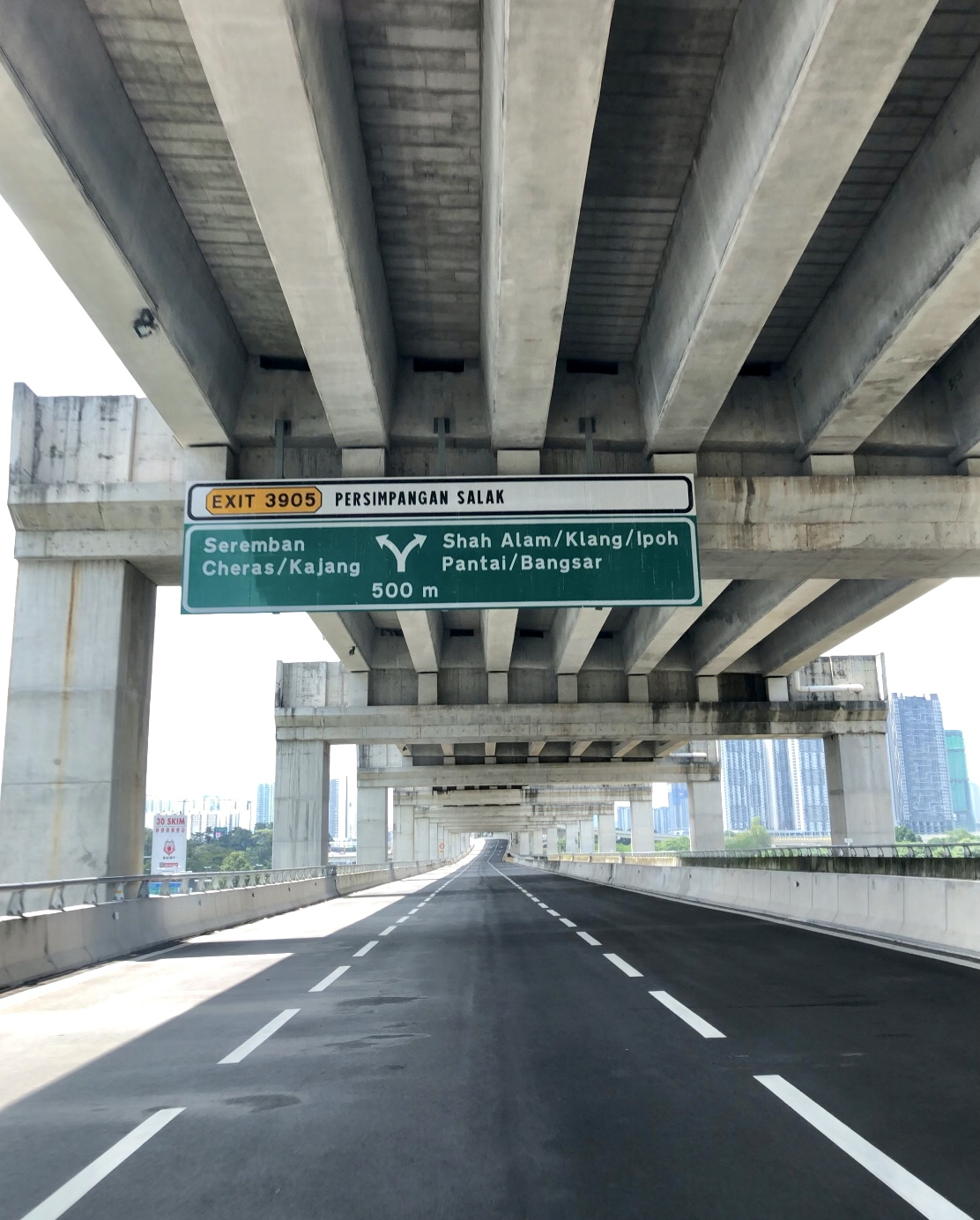
SPE double-decker section at Bandar Malaysia heading towards Salak interchange with East–West Link Expressway and Kuala Lumpur–Seremban Expressway

- The whole main link of the expressway will be elevated entirely.
- Starting at Kampung Pandan to the Salak Interchange adjacent to Taman Desa/Seputeh, the expressway features a double-decker flyover.
- It is one of only few highways in Malaysia to have a double-decker flyover.
- All toll plazas are elevated.
- The Kuala Lumpur skyline is visible throughout the majority of the highway.

== Toll rates ==
Class	Type of vehicles	Rate (in Malaysian Ringgit (RM))
0	Motorcycles, bicycles or vehicles with 2 or less wheels	Free
1	Vehicles with 2 axles and 3 or 4 wheels excluding taxis	RM 3.50
2	Vehicles with 2 axles and 5 or 6 wheels excluding buses	RM 7.00
3	Vehicles with 3 or more axles	RM 10.50
4	Taxis	RM 1.80
5	Buses	RM 3.50

== Junction lists ==
The entire route is in Kuala Lumpur.

Below is a list of interchanges (exits) and toll plazas along the Setiawangsa–Pantai Expressway (SPE). Exits are arranged in ascending numerical order from north to south.

Legend:

- I/C - Interchange, I/S - Intersection, RSA - Rest and service area, OBR - Overhead bridge restaurant, R/R - Restaurant and rest plaza, L/B - Layby, V/P - Vista point, TN - tunnel, T/P - Toll plaza, BR - Bridge
- C - Cloverleaf, S - Stack, T-A - Trumpet-A, T-B - Trumpet-B, DT - Directional-T/Y, SDT - Semi-Directional-T/Y, P-Y - Partial-Y, D - Diamond, P-C - Partial cloverleaf, D-D - Diverging diamond, D-R - Direct ramp

Location	km	mi	Exit	Name	Destinations	Notes
Wangsa Maju	0.0	0.0	Through to FT 28 Kuala Lumpur Middle Ring Road 2			
Wangsa Maju	0.0	0.0		Taman Melati I/C	FT 28 Kuala Lumpur Middle Ring Road 2 – Taman Melati, Gombak, Sungai Buloh, Batu Caves, Selayang; Kuala Lumpur–Karak Expressway – Kuantan, Karak, Genting Highland, IIUM; Duta–Ulu Klang Expressway – Jalan Duta, Segambut, Ipoh	Exit only to northbound MRR2
Wangsa Maju				TAR UMT I/C	Tunku Abdul Rahman University of Management and Technology (TAR UMT)	LiLO interchange; entry only from northbound, exit to both directions
Wangsa Maju			3915	Genting Klang I/C	FT 2 Jalan Genting Klang – Kuala Lumpur City Centre, Setapak, JPJ; FT 68 Jalan Gombak – Gombak, Bentong, Janda Baik	Exit only from northbound
Wangsa Maju			Wangsa Maju Toll Plaza; Touch 'n Go SmartTAG MyRFiD; Elevated toll plaza			
Setiawangsa			3912	Setiawangsa I/C	Duta–Ulu Klang Expressway – Jalan Duta, Segambut, Ipoh, Ulu Klang, AU2, Ampang, Taman Melawati; Setiawangsa – Jelatek, Wangsa Maju, Setiawangsa, AU1; Sungai Besi–Ulu Klang Elevated Expressway – Seremban, Cheras, Sri Petaling, Sungai Besi; East Klang Valley Expressway – Hulu Langat, Bandar Mahkota Cheras, Kajang, Semenyih	Toll plaza for entry ramps toward Pantai; stacked interchange
Setiawangsa			3911	Ampang I/C	Ampang–Kuala Lumpur Elevated Highway – Jalan Tun Razak, Jalan Sultan Ismail, KLCC, Ampang, Ampang Jaya; Sungai Besi–Ulu Klang Elevated Expressway – Seremban, Cheras, Sri Petaling, Sungai Besi	Entry only from E12; stacked interchange
Bukit Bintang			3909	Bulatan Kampung Pandan I/C	Kampung Pandan Roundabout; Jalan Tun Razak – KLCC, Kuala Lumpur Hospital; Jalan Kampung Pandan – Kampung Pandan, Taman Maluri, Desa Pandan, Ampang; Sungai Besi Expressway – Serdang, Sungai Besi, Putrajaya, UPM; FT 1 Jalan Cheras – Cheras, Loke Yew, Kajang; Jalan Bukit Bintang – Pavilion Kuala Lumpur; Maju Expressway – Putrajaya, Cyberjaya, KLIA; Jalan Nahkoda Yusuf – Cheras Perdana, Pandan Indah, IKEA Cheras, MyTown, Sunway Velocity	Stacked interchange above the roundabout
Bukit Bintang			Chan Sow Lin Toll Plaza; Touch 'n Go SmartTAG MyRFiD; Double-decker toll plaza			
Bukit Bintang				Bandar Malaysia I/C	Bandar Malaysia	Proposed; to be constructed after Bandar Malaysia development
Bukit Bintang			3905	Salak I/C	Kuala Lumpur–Seremban Expressway – Sri Petaling, Bukit Jalil, Sungai Besi, Serdang; North–South Expressway Southern Route – Seremban, Malacca, Johor Bahru; East–West Link Expressway – Cheras, Taman Connaught, Taman Cuepacs; Cheras–Kajang Expressway – Cheras, Kajang, Hulu Langat	Stacked interchange
Kerinchi			3902	Jalan Klang Lama I/C	Jalan Klang Lama, Jalan Syed Putra	Stacked interchange
Kerinchi			3901	Kerinchi I/C	Sprint Expressway Kerinchi Link – Kerinchi, Damansara, Penchala, Petaling Jaya; Damansara–Puchong Expressway – Puchong, Putrajaya, Kepong; FT 2 Federal Highway – Shah Alam, Klang, Petaling Jaya	Stacked interchange
1.000 mi = 1.609 km; 1.000 km = 0.621 mi: Concurrency terminus; Proposed; Incomplete access

== Controversy ==
- Jalan U-Thant residents filed a lawsuit claiming the expressway built next to their houses disregards the impact on their health and well-being with the increased noise levels and air pollution.
- A Facebook page was created protesting against the construction claiming many reasons the expressway is bad for a lot of aspects.
- While the expressway was under construction, roads under the expressway alignment were severely damaged as a result of poor construction site maintenance and had problems such as potholes, poor lighting, faulty traffic lights and poor drainage that caused implications including accidents as well as damages to the vehicles using these roads.

== Gallery ==
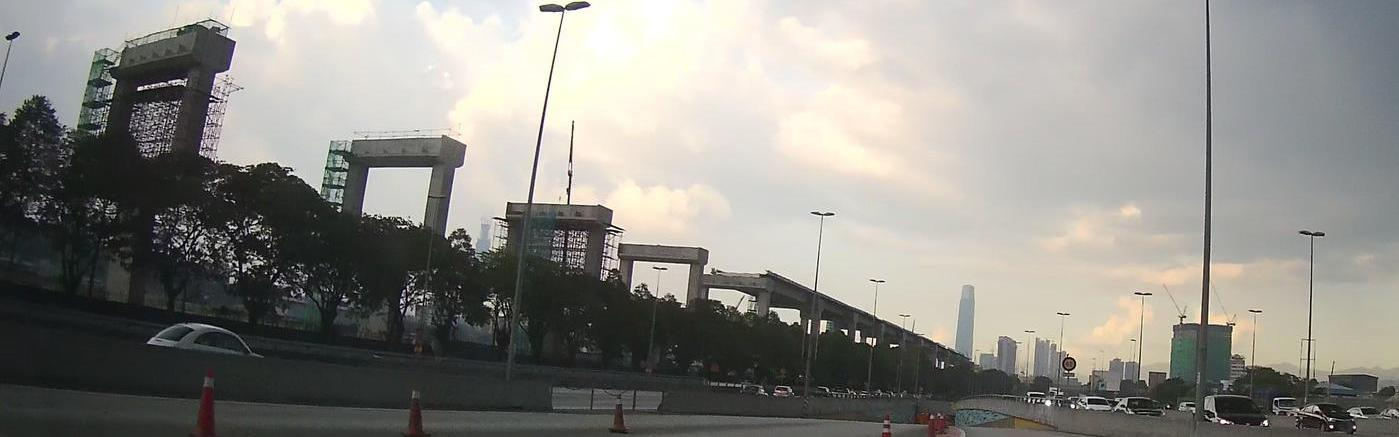
SPE Expressway under construction at Bandar Malaysia near Kuala Lumpur–Seremban Expressway

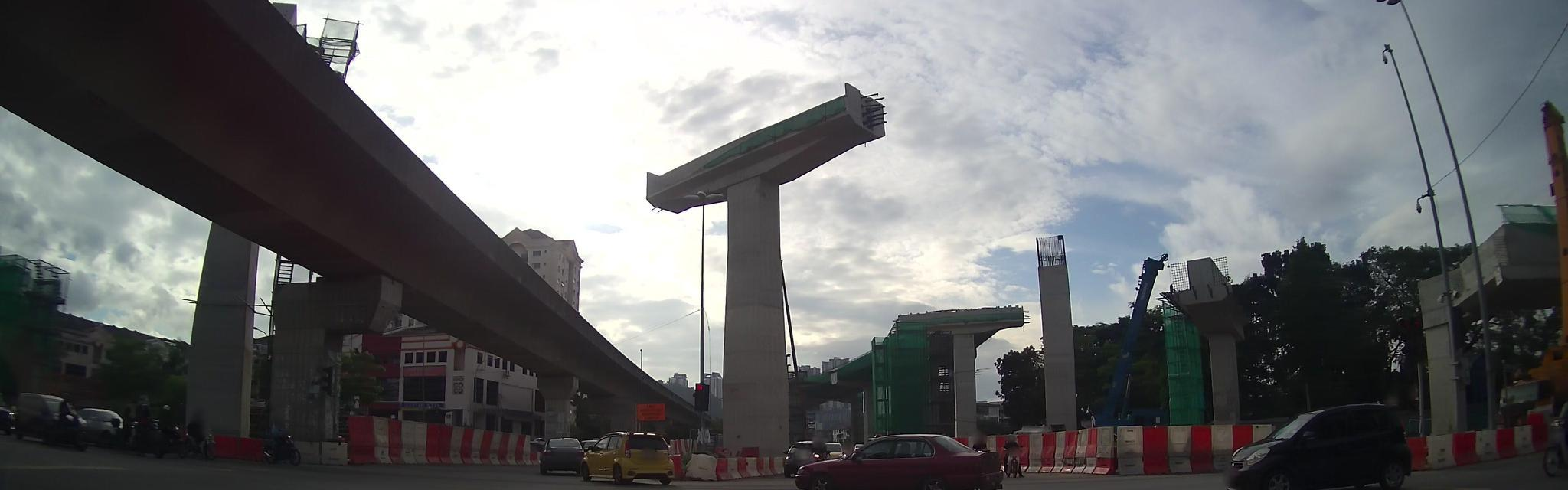
Genting Klang Intersection under construction

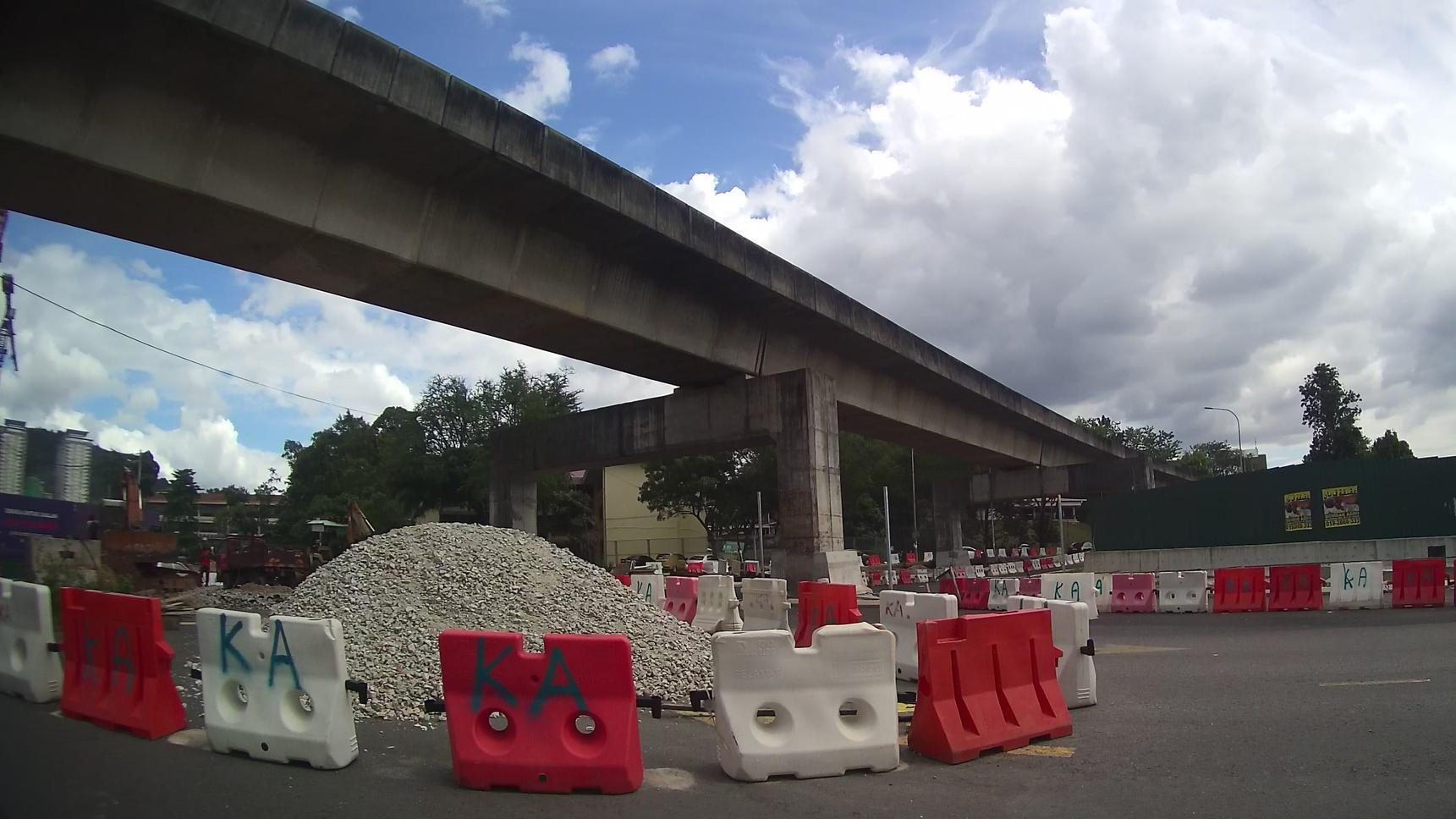
SPE Highway under construction at TARUMT

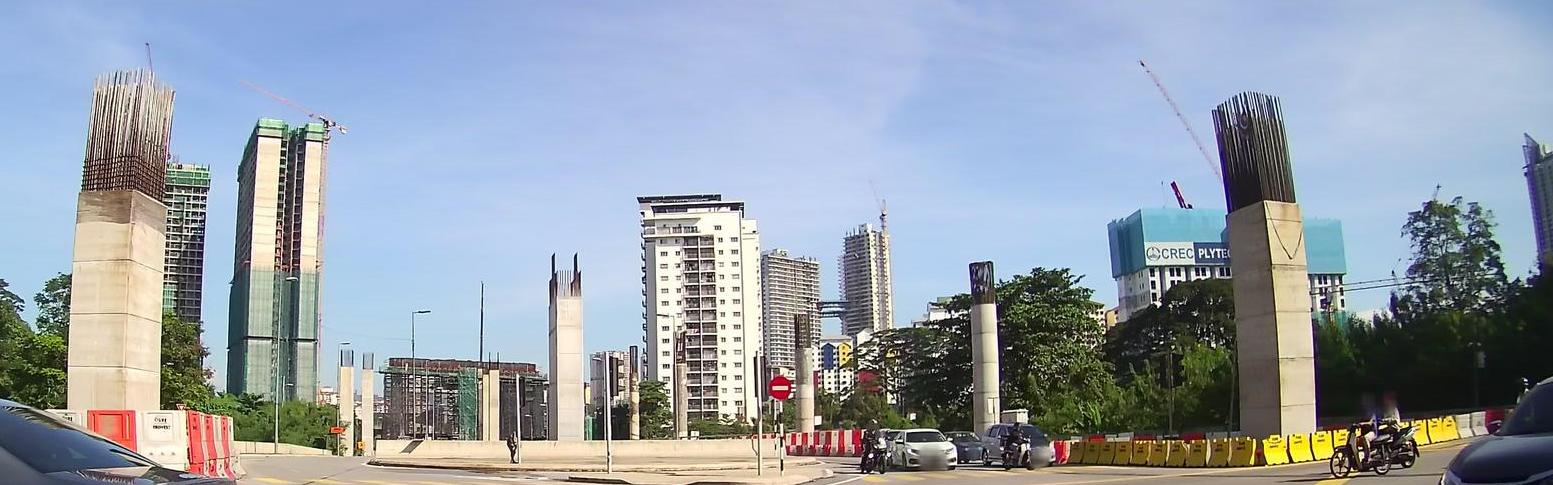
SPE Highway under construction at Jalan Ampang

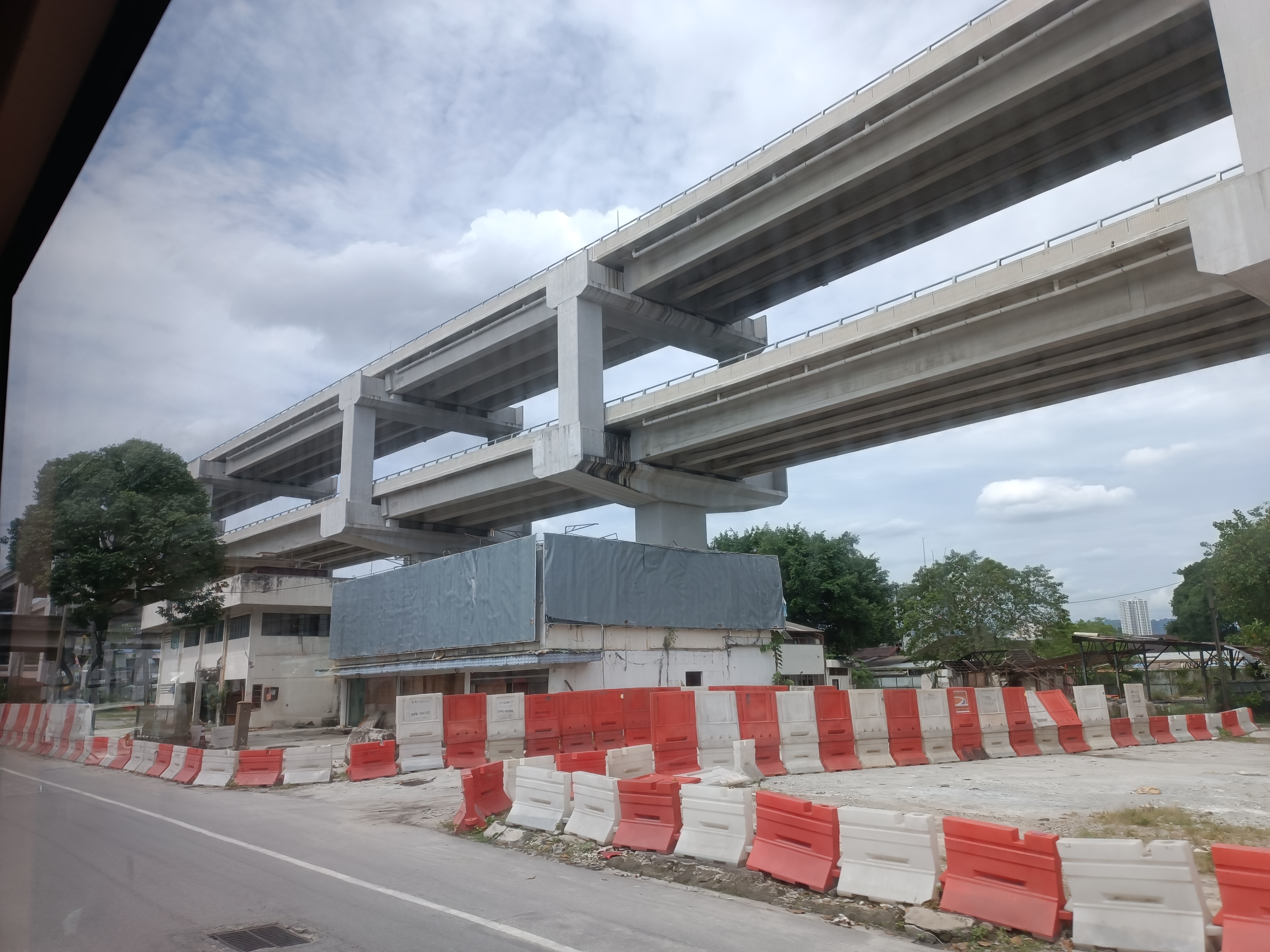
SPE Highway under construction at Jalan Chan Sow Lin

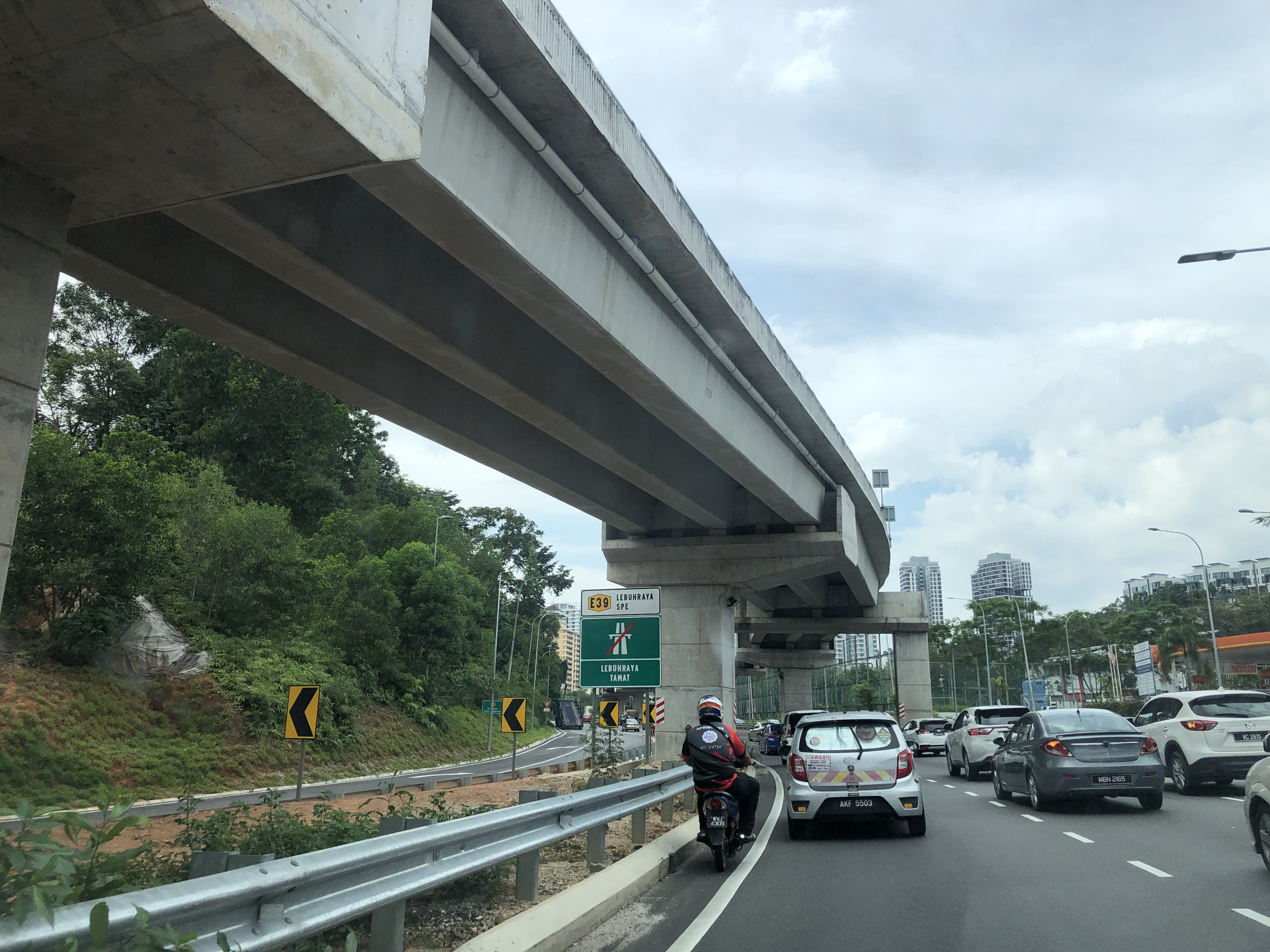
SPE exit ramp/end of expressway at Taman Melati

Completed SPE Highway section seen from Jalan Ampang

== See also ==
- Duta–Ulu Klang Expressway
- Kuala Lumpur Middle Ring Road 2
- List of expressways and highways in Malaysia
