= Selangor State Route B36 =

Road in Malaysia

Selangor Route 36
- Jalan Kerja Ayer Lama

Major junctions
- West end: Ampang
- FT 28 Kuala Lumpur Middle Ring Road 2 Ampang–Kuala Lumpur Elevated Highway
- East end: Taman Tun Razak

Location
- Country: Malaysia
- Primary destinations: Ukay Heights, Kelab Darul Ehsan

Highway system
- Highways in Malaysia; Expressways; Federal; State

Selangor State Route B36 is a major road in Selangor, Malaysia.

== Junction lists ==
The entire route is located in Hulu Langat District, Selangor.

Legend:

- I/C - Interchange, I/S - Intersection, RSA - Rest and service area, OBR - Overhead bridge restaurant, R/R - Restaurant and rest plaza, L/B - Layby, V/P - Vista point, TN - tunnel, T/P - Toll plaza, BR - Bridge
- C - Cloverleaf, S - Stack, T-A - Trumpet-A, T-B - Trumpet-B, DT - Directional-T/Y, SDT - Semi-Directional-T/Y, P-Y - Partial-Y, D - Diamond, P-C - Partial cloverleaf, D-D - Diverging diamond, D-R - Direct ramp

Location	km	mi	Name	Destinations	Notes
Ampang			Ampang	FT 28 Kuala Lumpur Middle Ring Road 2 – Hulu Kelang, Kuantan, Batu Caves, Ipoh, Kepong, Cheras, Klang, Shah Alam, Petaling Jaya, Kuala Lumpur International Airport (KLIA); B31 Jalan Ampang – Ampang town centre, Kuala Lumpur	T-junctions
Ampang			Jalan Kerja Ayer Lama-AKLEH	Ampang–Kuala Lumpur Elevated Highway – Kuala Lumpur, KLCC	
Ampang			International School of Kuala Lumpur (ISKL)		
Ampang			Ukay Heights		
Ampang			Ampang Jaya		
Ampang			Taman Tun Razak	Kelab Darul Ehsan	
1.000 mi = 1.609 km; 1.000 km = 0.621 mi
