= Jelatek LRT station =

Metro station in Kuala Lumpur, Malaysia

Coordinates: 3.1673°N 101.7353°E

KJ6 Jelatek
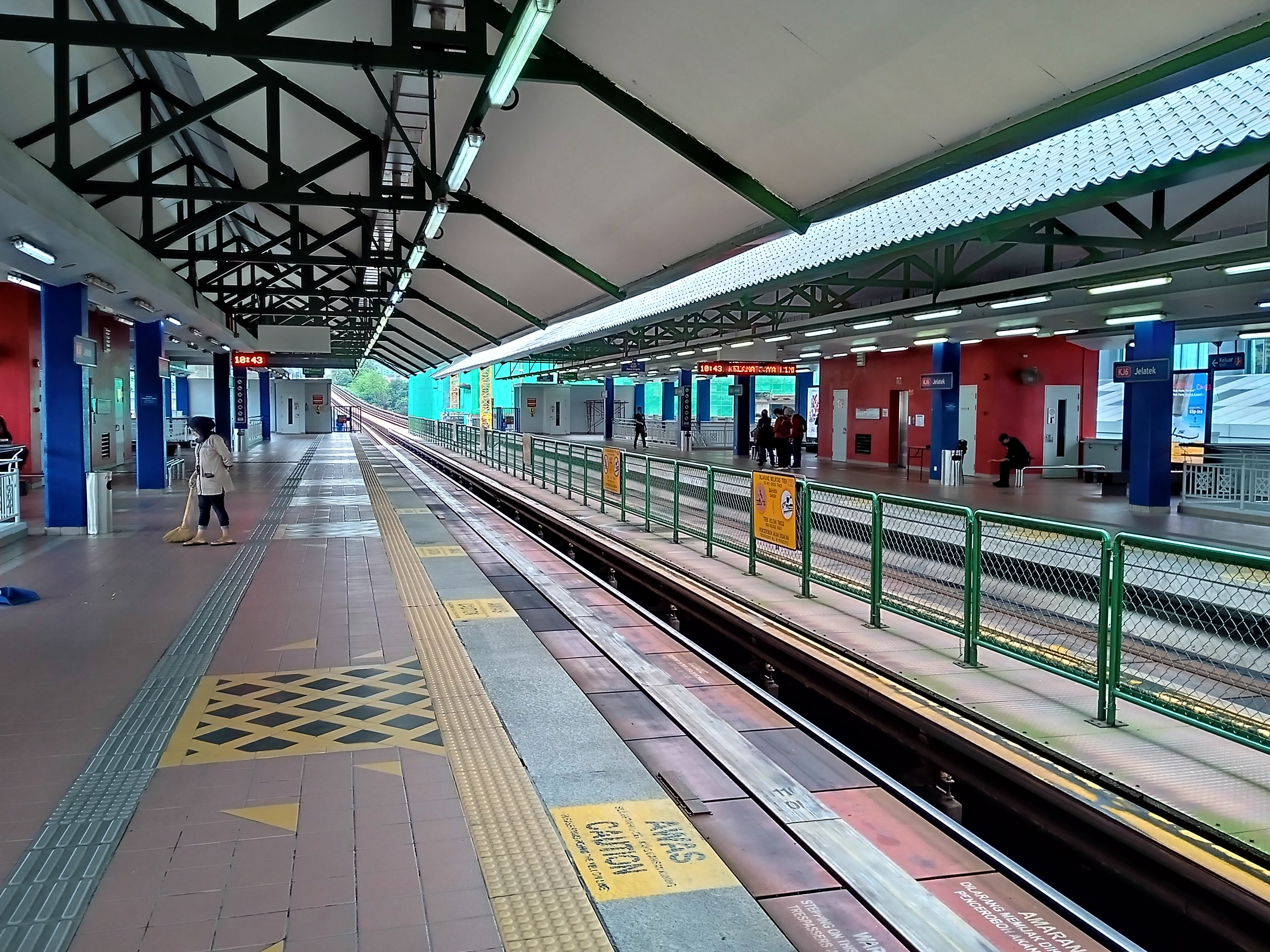

General information
- Other names: Malay: جلاتيق (Jawi); Chinese: 遮拉迪; Tamil: ஜெலாதேக்
- Location: Jalan Jelatek; AU1, Taman Keramat; 54200 Kuala Lumpur; Malaysia
- System: Rapid KL
- Owner: Prasarana Malaysia
- Operator: Rapid Rail
- Line: 5 Kelana Jaya Line
- Platforms: 2 side platforms
- Tracks: 2

Construction
- Structure type: Elevated
- Parking: Available with payment. 292 total parking bays.
- Accessible: Available

Other information
- Station code: KJ6

History
- Opened: 1 June 1999; 27 years ago

Services
Preceding station		Following station
Setiawangsa towards Gombak	Kelana Jaya Line	Dato' Keramat towards Putra Heights
Location

Jelatek LRT station is an elevated light rapid transit (LRT) station in Kuala Lumpur that is served by Rapid KL's LRT Kelana Jaya Line.

== Trunk buses ==
Route No.	Origin	Destination	Via	Connecting to
220	Taman Melawati	Lebuh Ampang	Jalan Taman Melawati; Jalan Melawati 1 Jalan Melawati 2 Caltex Taman Melawati; FT 28 Kuala Lumpur Middle Ring Road 2 (MRR2); Jalan AU 3/1; Jalan Enggang; KJ6 Jelatek; KJ7 Dato' Keramat; Jalan Keramat; Jalan Padang Tembak; Jalan Semarak; Jalan Raja Muda Abdul Aziz; Jalan Tunku Abdul Rahman; Jalan Raja; Lebuh Pasar Besar	100, 103, 104, 107, 120, 121, 122, 150, 151, 152, 170, 171, 172, 173, 180, 190, 191, 200, 202, 250, 252, 300, 303
