= Setiawangsa LRT station =

Train station in Ampang, Malaysia

KJ5 CC15 Setiawangsa
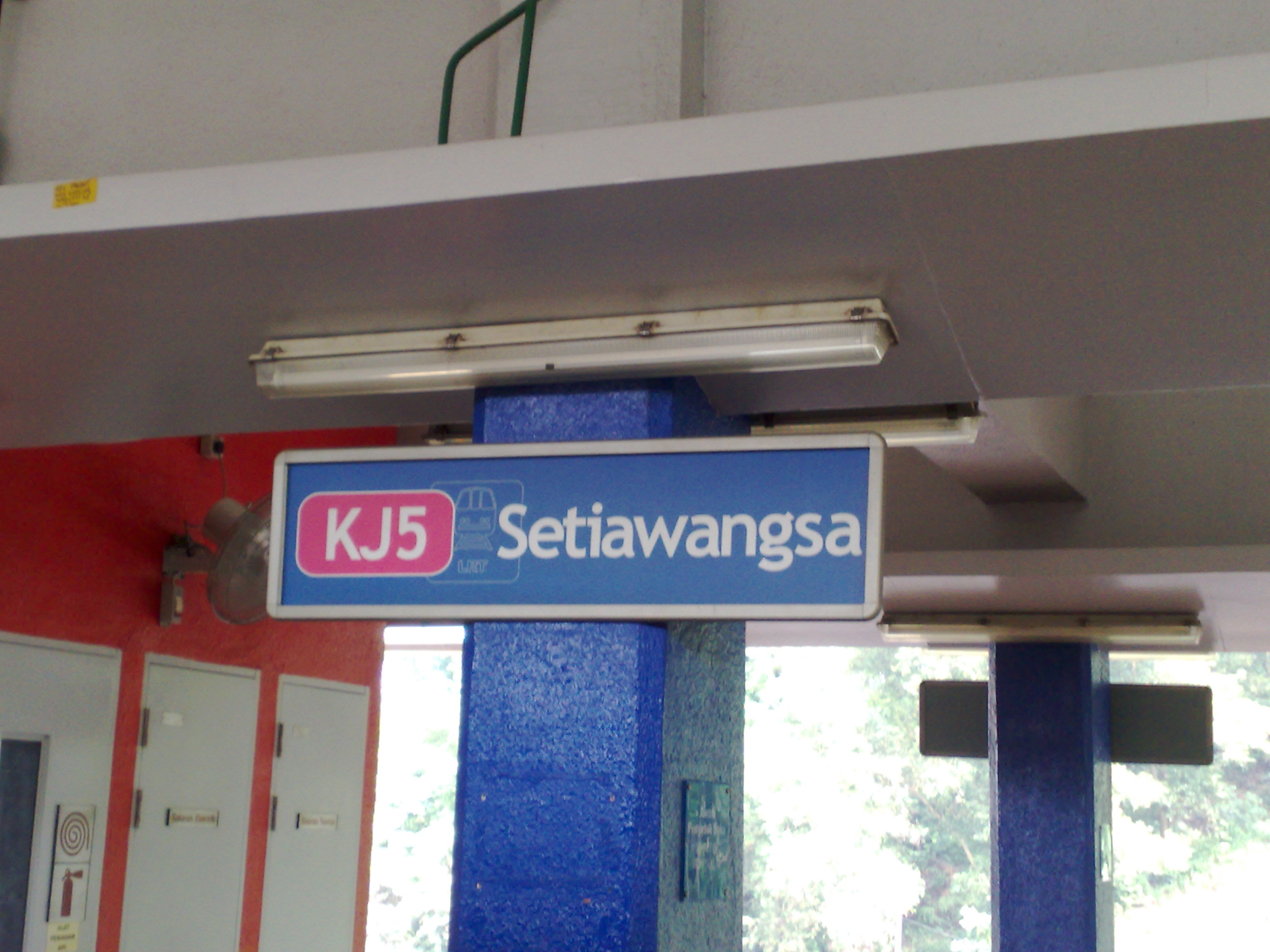

General information
- Other names: Malay: ستياوڠسا (Jawi); Chinese: 斯迪亚旺沙; Tamil: செத்தியாவங்சா
- Location: Jalan Jelatek; AU1, Taman Setiawangsa; 54200 Kuala Lumpur; Malaysia
- Coordinates: 3°10′32.57″N 101°44′09.09″E
- System: Rapid KL
- Owner: Prasarana Malaysia (LRT); MRT Corp (MRT)
- Operator: Rapid Rail
- Lines: 5 Kelana Jaya Line; 13 Circle Line (future)
- Platforms: 1 island platform
- Tracks: 2

Construction
- Structure type: Elevated
- Parking: Available with payment. 125 total parking bays.

Other information
- Station code: KJ5 CC15

History
- Opened: 1 June 1999; 27 years ago (LRT)
- Opening: 2032; 6 years' time (MRT)

Services
Preceding station		Following station
Sri Rampai towards Gombak	Kelana Jaya Line	Jelatek towards Putra Heights
AU2 Clockwise / outer	Circle Line Future service	Rejang Anticlockwise / inner
Location

Setiawangsa LRT station is an elevated light rapid transit (LRT) station in Ampang, Malaysia, served by the LRT Kelana Jaya Line. The station was opened on 1 June 1999, as part of the line's second segment encompassing 12 stations between Masjid Jamek and Gombak (then known as Terminal PUTRA) (not including Sri Rampai) and an underground line.

The station is planned as a future interchange with the upcoming MRT Circle Line of the KVMRT project.

== Location ==
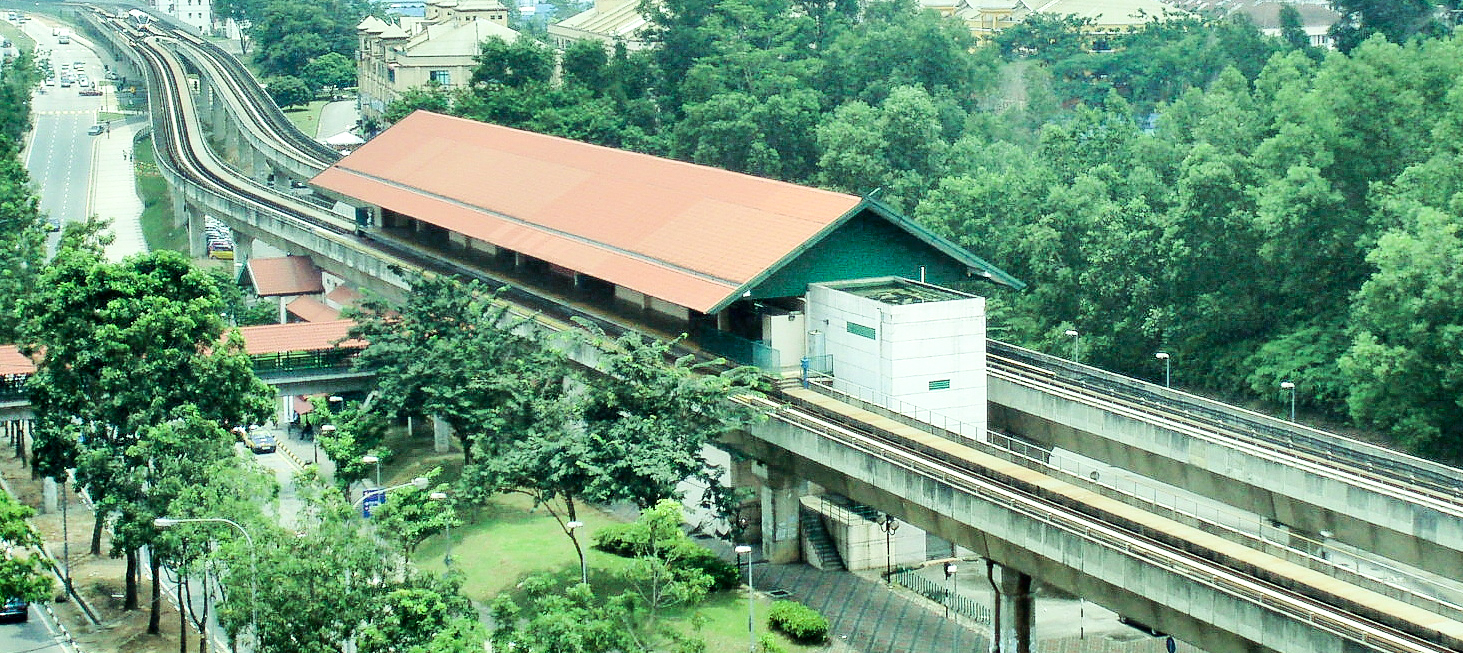
A bird's eye view of Setiawangsa station.

Setiawangsa station is physically situated in Ampang, Selangor and near the Kuala Lumpur-Selangor state border and Kuala Lumpur city limits, north from the commercial core of the city along Jalan Jelatek, which borders the hilly areas of Semarak to the west and a housing estate officially known as AU1 (also known as Taman Keramat Permai) to the east. The station takes its name from Taman Setiawangsa, a large housing estate just northeast up Jalan Jelatek, from which Jalan Jelatek meets at an intersection with Jalan Setiawangsa and Jalan Taman Setiawangsa. The station thus serves the localities of AU1, Semarak and Taman Setiawangsa, as well as enclosed areas.

== Design ==
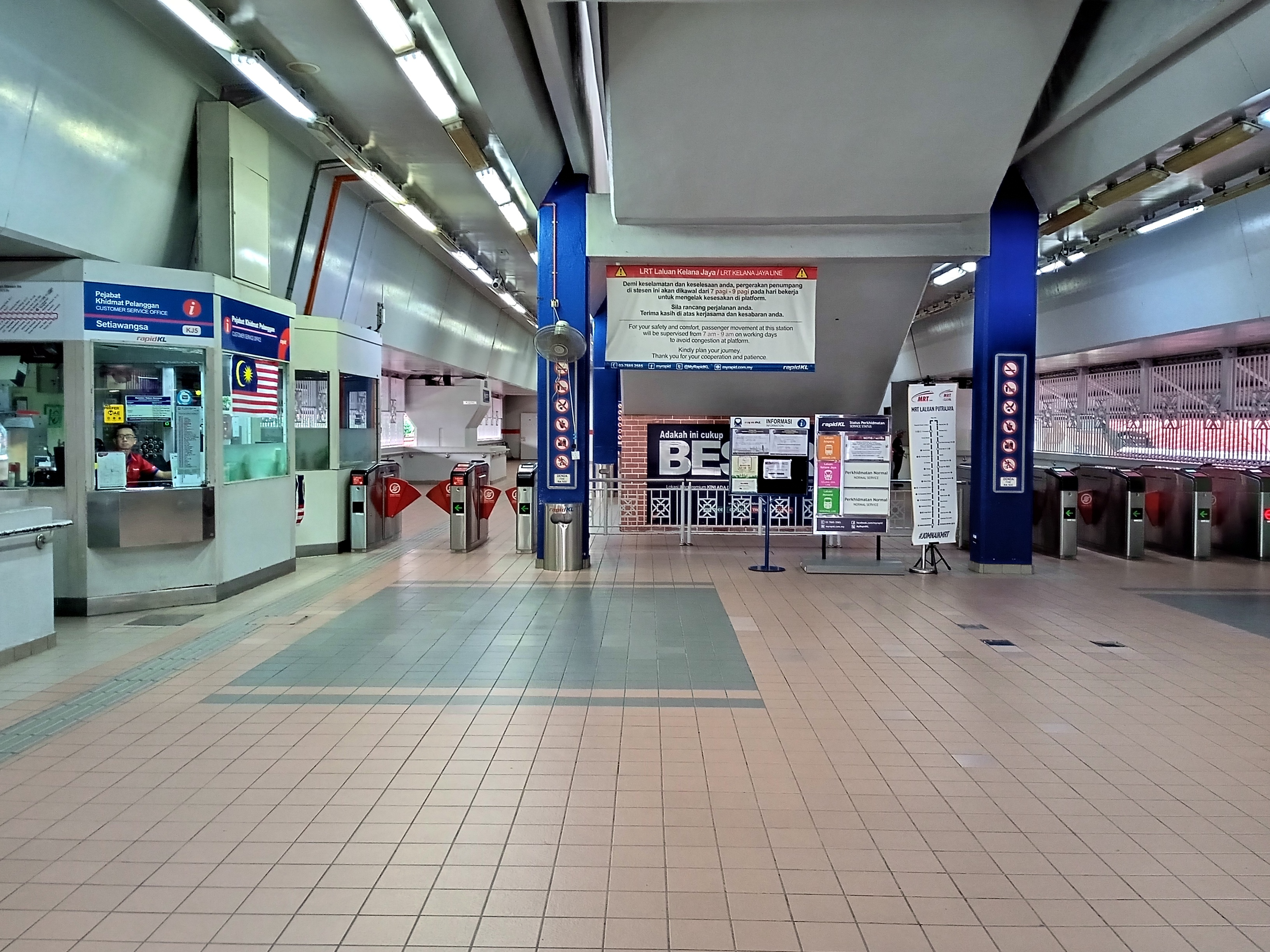
Fare gates at the concourse of the station, in 2023

As an elevated station, Setiawangsa station contains three levels: The access points at street level, and the ticket area and adjoining platforms on the two elevated levels. All levels are linked via stairways, escalators and elevators designated for disabled passengers. The station utilises a single island platform for trains travelling in both directions of the line, and is entirely sheltered by a gabled roof supported by latticed frames.

== Bus services ==
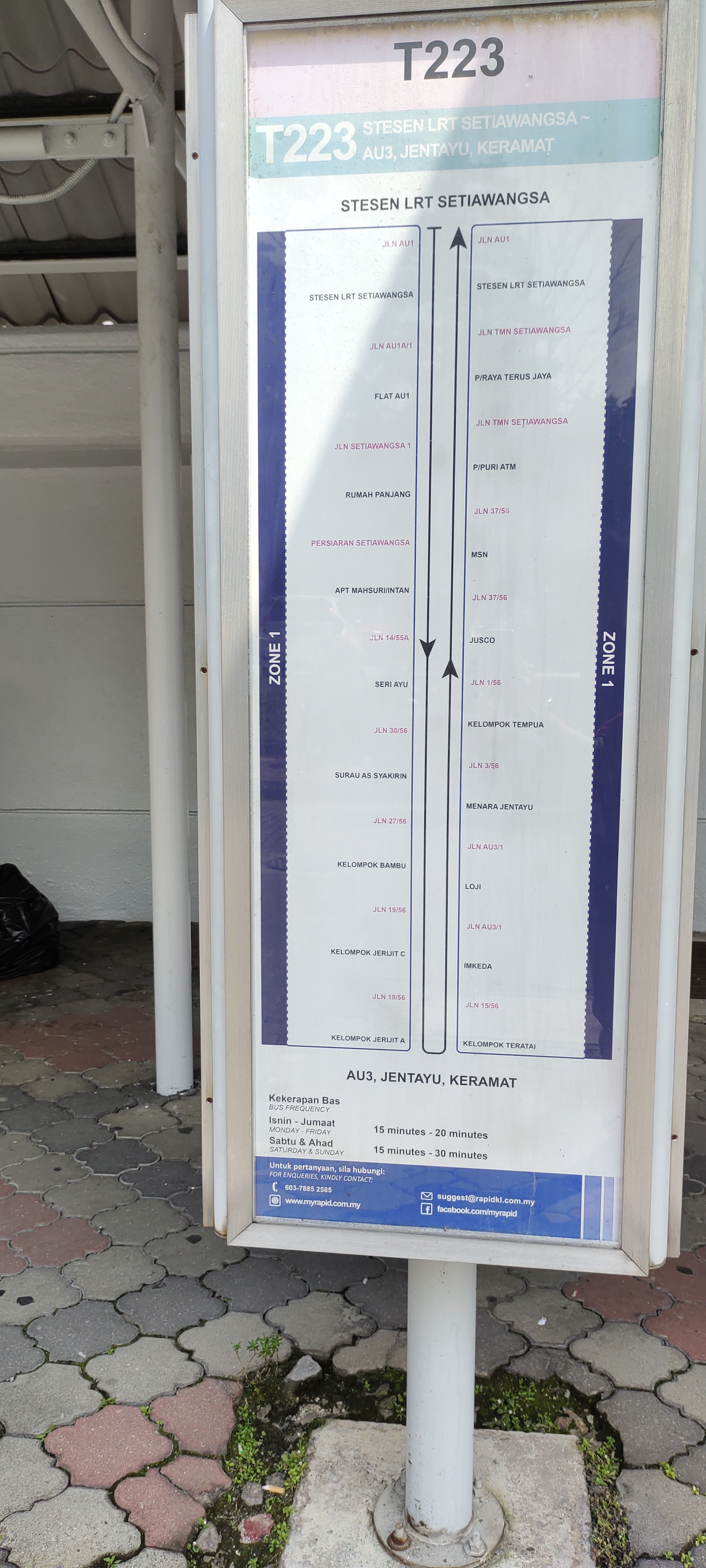
Bus route T223 information board at Setiawangsa LRT station. Parts of the route had been rerouted on 3 September 2020 and replaced with GOKL Turquoise line.

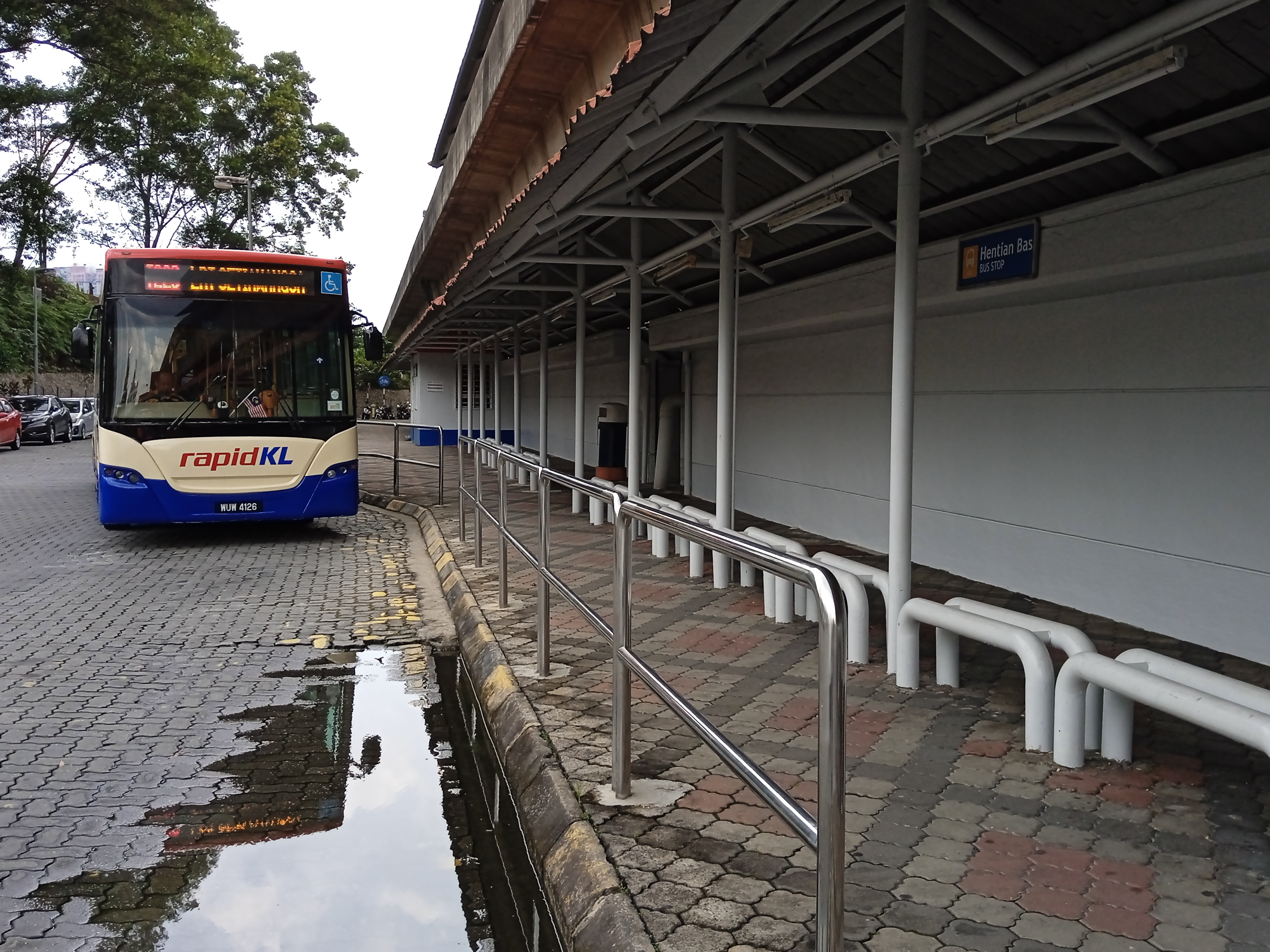
Setiawangsa LRT bus hub serves Rapid KL T223 bus route, in 2023

Route No.	Origin	Destination	Via	Connecting to
T223	KJ5 Setiawangsa	AU3, Taman Setiawangsa	Jalan Jelatek; Jalan AU 1A/1; Jalan Taman Setiawangsa; Jalan 10/56; Jalan AU 3/1; Jalan 3/56; Jalan 1/56; Jalan Taman Setiwangsa	220, 251, 253, TUQRUOISE
GOKL Turquoise Line	KJ5 Dato' Keramat	(circular route)	Jalan Keramat Dalam; Jalan Jelatek; Jalan Taman Setiawangsa; Jalan Setiawangsa 1 Persiaran Setiawangsa; Jalan 14/55a Jalan 30/56; Jalan 27/56; Jalan 19/56; Jalan 15/56; Jalan 1/56; Jalan Taman Setiwangsa; Jalan Jelatek; Jalan Dato Keramat	220, T223, T224

== See also ==
- List of rail transit stations in Klang Valley
