= Setiawangsa =

Coordinates: 3.1852515°N 101.7464635°E

- Suburb
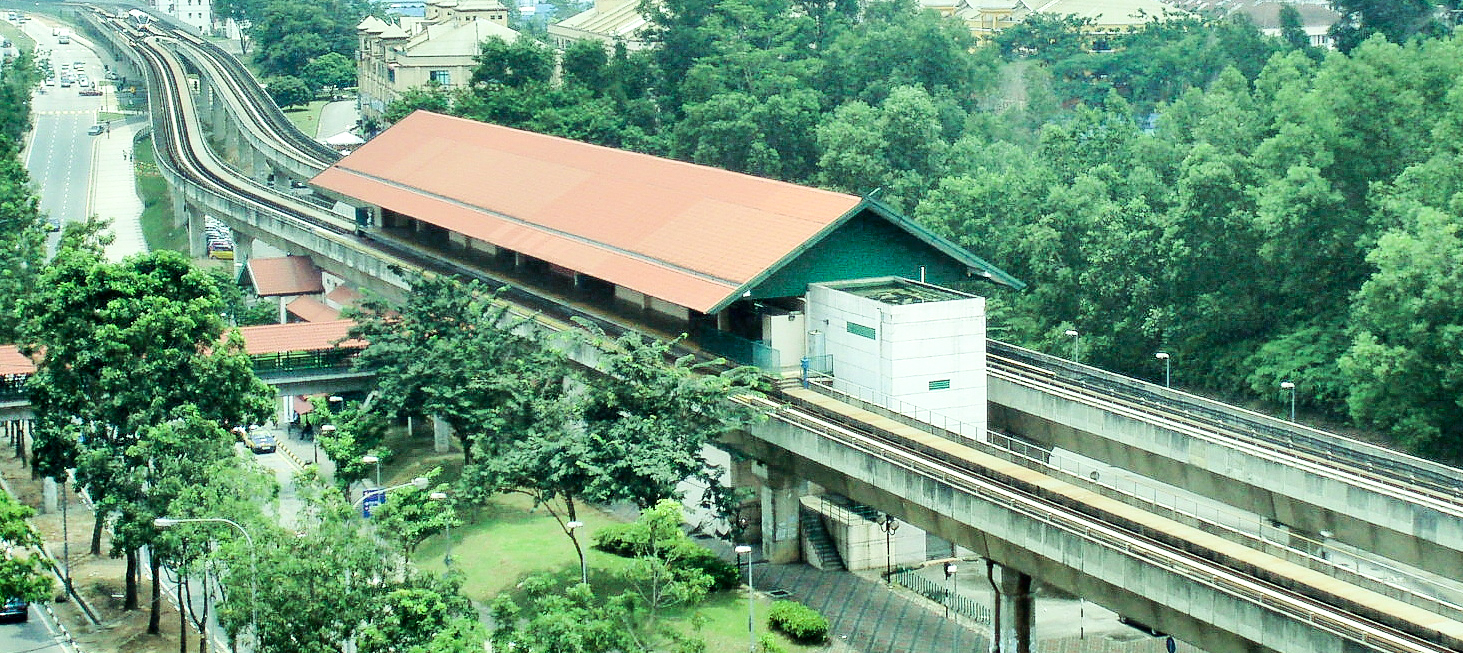
- Setiawangsa LRT station, aerial view
- Interactive map of Setiawangsa
- Country: Malaysia
- State: Federal Territory of Kuala Lumpur
- Constituency: Setiawangsa (federal constituency)

Government
  - Local Authority: Dewan Bandaraya Kuala Lumpur
  - Mayor: Nor Hisham Ahmad Dahlan
- Time zone: UTC+8 (MST)
- Postcode: 54200
- Dialling code: +603
- Police: Setiawangsa

Setiawangsa is an eastern suburb in Kuala Lumpur, Malaysia, located less than 4 kilometres from the city centre and located right next to Ampang. There are 4 main residentials within this area;

1. Taman Setiawangsa
2. Tiara Setiawangsa
3. Bukit Setiawangsa
4. Puncak Setiawangsa

While Taman Setiawangsa and Tiara Setiawangsa are located on the busier, flatter and more visible front part of the suburb, Puncak Setiawangsa and Bukit Setiawangsa are neighborhoods positioned higher up on the hills in a quieter surrounding.

The residential was developed by Island & Peninsular (I&P) Group Sdn Bhd. The foothill and mid-hill areas were originally part of Bukit Dinding, developed in stages in the 1980s and renamed as Bukit Setiawangsa. Final phase of the development was Puncak Setiawangsa, which was completed in 1995.

The lists of tenants here is changing daily, due possibly to the easier traffic flow (helped by the new Duta–Ulu Klang Expressway (DUKE)), competitive rentals and accessibility between KL, Petaling Jaya and other suburbs. Firms such as Texas Instruments, I & P, Right Balance Group, Fidin Universal, Tanjung and RB Helicopters all have their operational bases in Setiawangsa. Japanese retailer JUSCO(now, AEON) also has one outlet operating here in AU2 since 2008.

The parliamentary constituency Setiawangsa has been led since 2018 by Nik Nazmi of PKR.

== Natural disasters ==
=== 28 December 2012 ===
Incident: slope failure / fallen retainer wall

The engineered slope holding up Puncak Setiawangsa which has been standing tall at 10–11 berms, totalling over 50m high, since the early 1990s failed dramatically at the 2200 hour on Friday, 28 December 2012. Three families were ordered to evacuate from the bungalows at Puncak Setiawangsa. 13 retailers at the row of shoplots across the retainer wall were also asked to evacuate.

=== 17 November 2020 ===
Incident: Flashflood

Heavy rain that caused a flashflood from Bukit Dinding onto the residentials at Bukit Setiawangsa.

=== February 2022 ===
Incident: Landslide at the side of the earlier fallen retainer wall

A landslide happened at the side of the earlier fallen retainer wall after heavy rain. Vegetation was removed and DBKL superficially cemented the wall to avoid further erosion and for aesthetic purpose.

== Education ==
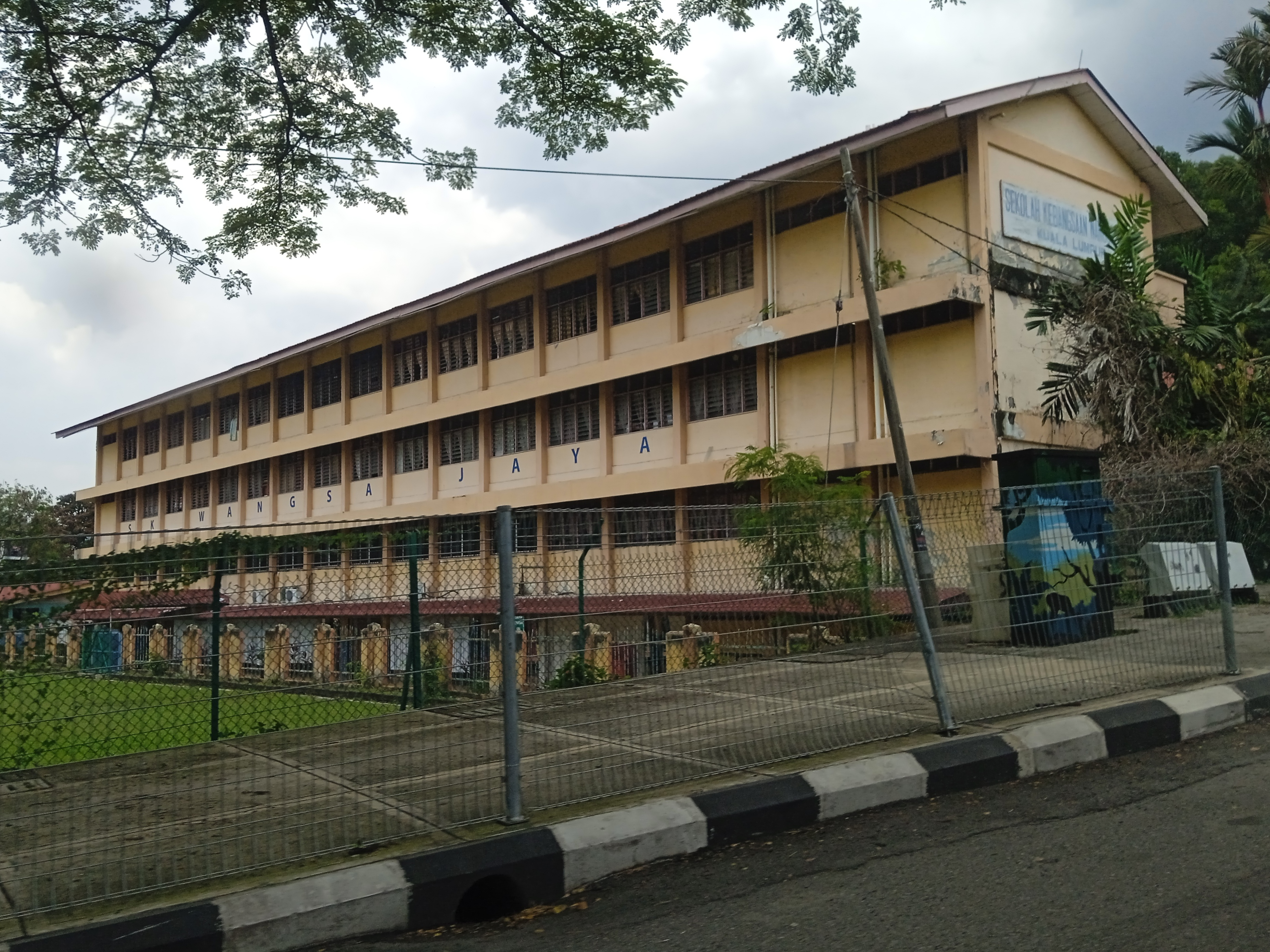
SK Setiawangsa

SK Setiawangsa is classified as Top Performance School in Kuala Lumpur.

Additionally, a secondary school SMK Taman Setiawangsa is located in Setiawangsa hill and DUKE. Alumni of the school include rapper and actor Juzzthin and filmmaker and actor Pierre Andre, filmmaker and LoneWvlf music label owner Al Bakri Harith.

Brighton International School - is the only International school within Setiawangsa.

== Transportation ==
=== Public transport ===
Setiawangsa is served by Setiawangsa LRT station on the Kelana Jaya Line.

=== Car ===
The last entry route to Setiawangsa/AU2 area is the MRR2 Federal Route 28. The Duta–Ulu Klang Expressway which connects Setiawangsa to Segambut/Mont Kiara, starts here.
