= Abdullah Fauzi Ahmad Razali =

Malaysian politician

Yang Berbahagia Dato' Abdullah Fauzi Ahmad Razali DPMP

Member of the Perak State Legislative Assembly for Kampong Gajah
- In office 5 May 2013 – 9 May 2018
- Preceded by: Wan Norashikin Wan Noordin (BN–UMNO)
- Succeeded by: Wan Norashikin Wan Noordin (BN–UMNO)
- Majority: 6,100 (2013)

Personal details
- Party: United Malays National Organisation (UMNO)
- Other political affiliations: Barisan Nasional (BN)
- Occupation: Politician

Abdullah Fauzi bin Ahmad Razali is a Malaysian politician. He served as Member of Perak State Legislative Assembly (MLA) for Kampong Gajah from May 2013 to May 2018. He is a member of United Malays National Organisation (UMNO), a component party of Barisan Nasional (BN).

== Post career ==
Abdullah Fauzi is an Executive Chairman of Capvest Security. He also served on the Board of Directors of the Farmers' Organization Board from 2016 to 2019 in Kampong Gajah.

== Election results ==
Perak State Legislative Assembly
Year	Constituency	Candidate	Votes	Pct	Opponent(s)	Votes	Pct	Ballots cast	Majority	Turnout
2013	N49 Kampong Gajah	Abdullah Fauzi Ahmad Razali (UMNO)	14,140	63.75%	Ishak Saari (PAS)	8,040	36.25%	22,715	6,100	85.80%

== Honours ==
- Perak
  - Knight Commander of the Order of the Perak State Crown (DPMP) – Dato' (2017)
