= Wan Norashikin Wan Noordin =

Malaysian politician

Yang Berbahagia Datuk Wan Norashikin Wan Noordin DPSM
- وان نورعاشقين بنت وان نورالدين

Member of the Perak State Executive Council
- In office 10 December 2020 – 21 November 2022
- Monarch: Nazrin Shah
- Menteri Besar: Saarani Mohamad
- Portfolio: Women and Family Development, Social Welfare and Non-Governmental Organisation
- Preceded by: Herself (Women Development & Family); Portfolio abolished (Community Welfare); Portfolio established (Social Welfare); Razman Zakaria (Non-Governmental Organisation)
- Succeeded by: Salbiah Mohamed (Women, Family & Social Welfare); Mohd Azlan Helmi (Non-Governmental Organisation)
- Constituency: Kampong Gajah
- In office 13 March 2020 – 5 December 2020
- Monarch: Nazrin Shah
- Menteri Besar: Ahmad Faizal Azumu
- Portfolio: Women Development, Family and Community Welfare
- Preceded by: Wong May Ing (Women and Family Development & Community Welfare)
- Succeeded by: Herself (Women and Family Development); Portfolio abolished (Community Welfare)
- Constituency: Kampong Gajah

Member of the Perak State Legislative Assembly for Kampong Gajah
- In office 9 May 2018 – 19 November 2022
- Preceded by: Abdullah Fauzi Ahmad Razali (BN–UMNO)
- Succeeded by: Zafarulazlan Zan (PN–PAS)
- Majority: 3,757 (2018)
- In office 8 March 2008 – 5 May 2013
- Preceded by: Tajuddin Abdul Rahman (BN–UMNO)
- Succeeded by: Abdullah Fauzi Ahmad Razali (BN–UMNO)
- Majority: 1,416 (2008)

Faction represented in Perak State Legislative Assembly
- 2008–2013: Barisan Nasional
- 2018–2022: Barisan Nasional

Personal details
- Born: Wan Norashikin binti Wan Noordin Perak, Malaysia
- Citizenship: Malaysian
- Party: United Malays National Organisation (UMNO) (–2025); Malaysian Islamic Party (PAS) (since 2025)
- Other political affiliations: Barisan Nasional (BN) (–2025); Perikatan Nasional (PN) (since 2025)
- Spouse(s): Edi Razman Mohd Ismail (died 2021) Muhammad Noor Farid Zainal (since 2024)
- Occupation: Politician

Wan Norashikin binti Wan Noordin is a Malaysian politician who served as Member of the Perak State Executive Council (EXCO) in the Perikatan Nasional (PN) state administration under former Menteri Besar Ahmad Faizal Azumu from March 2020 to the collapse of the state administration in December 2020 for the first term and again in the Barisan Nasional (BN) state administration under Menteri Besar Saarani Mohamad from December 2020 to November 2022 for the second term as well as Member of the Perak State Legislative Assembly (MLA) for Kampong Gajah from March 2008 to May 2013 for the first term and again from May 2018 to November 2022 for the second term. She is a member of the Malaysian Islamic Party (PAS), a component party of the PN coalition and was a member and State Women Chief of Perak of the United Malays National Organisation (UMNO), a component party of the BN coalition.

== Political career ==
=== Member of the Malaysian Islamic Party ===
On 20 April 2025, Wan Norashikin left UMNO and joined PAS. She submitted membership application form to the President of PAS Abdul Hadi Awang during the 2025 Ayer Kuning by-election campaign.

== Election results ==
Perak State Legislative Assembly
Year	Constituency	Candidate	Votes	Pct	Opponent(s)	Votes	Pct	Ballots cast	Majority	Turnout
2008	N49 Kampong Gajah	Wan Norashikin Wan Noordin (UMNO)	8,818	54.36%	Mustafa Shaari (PAS)	7,402	45.64%	16,624	1,416	76.53%
2018	N50 Kampong Gajah	Wan Norashikin Wan Noordin (UMNO)	11,026	48.86%	Mustafa Shaari (PAS)	7,681	34.03%	23,198	3,345	81.80%
2018	N50 Kampong Gajah	Wan Norashikin Wan Noordin (UMNO)	11,026	48.86%	Zaiton Latiff (AMANAH)	3,861	17.11%	23,198	3,345	81.80%
2022	N50 Kampong Gajah	Wan Norashikin Wan Noordin (UMNO)	11,877	38.77%	Zafarulazhan Zan (PAS)	15,634	51.03%	31,238	3,757	79.61%
2022	N50 Kampong Gajah	Wan Norashikin Wan Noordin (UMNO)	11,877	38.77%	Mohd Syamsul Alauddin (AMANAH)	2,824	9.22%	31,238	3,757	79.61%
2022	N50 Kampong Gajah	Wan Norashikin Wan Noordin (UMNO)	11,877	38.77%	Mohd Safian Sauri Pandak Abd Samad (PEJUANG)	299	0.98%	31,238	3,757	79.61%

== Honours ==
- Malacca
  - Companion Class II of the Exalted Order of Malacca (DPSM) – Datuk (2011)
