= Al Akram Mosque =

Mosque in Kuala Lumpur, Malaysia

- Masjid Al Akram
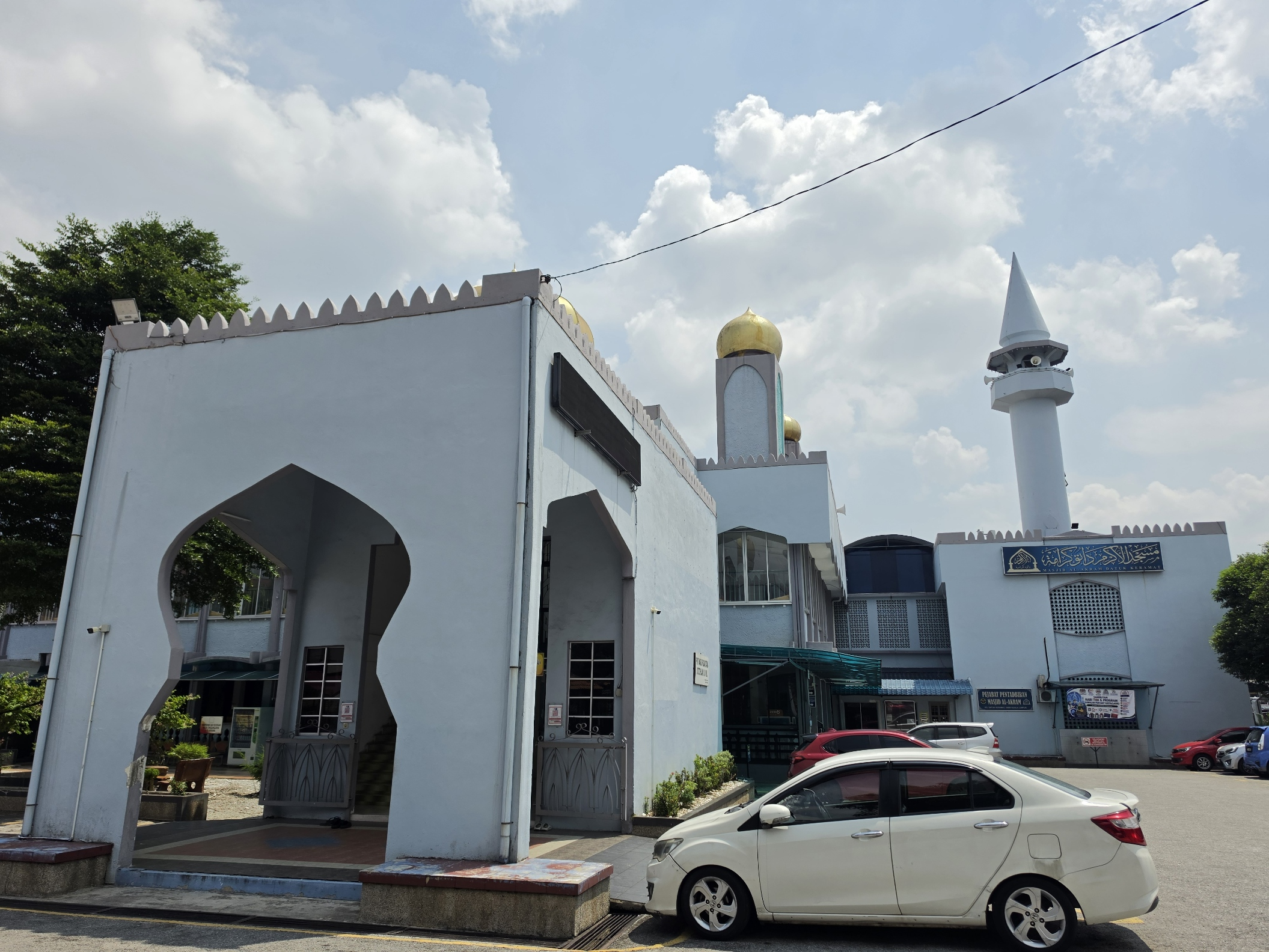

Religion
- Affiliation: Sunni Islam

Location
- Location: Kampung Datuk Keramat, Kuala Lumpur, Malaysia
- Interactive map of Al Akram Mosque
- Coordinates: 3°10′00″N 101°43′46.2″E

Architecture
- Type: Mosque
- Minaret: 1

Al Akram Mosque (Malay: Masjid Al Akram) is a mosque in Kampung Datuk Keramat, Kuala Lumpur, Malaysia.

== See also ==
- Islam in Malaysia
- GoogleMaps StreetView of Masjid Al-Akram Datuk Keramat
