= Grik (state constituency) =

Political subdivision in Malaysia

Coordinates: 5°19′59″N 101°22′3″E

Perak constituency

Defunct state constituency
- Legislature: Perak State Legislative Assembly
- Constituency created: 1958
- Constituency abolished: 1974
- First contested: 1959
- Last contested: 1969

Grik is a state constituency in Perak, Malaysia, that has been represented in the Perak State Legislative Assembly.

The state constituency was created in the 1958 redistribution and was mandated to return a single member to the Perak State Legislative Assembly under the first past the post voting system.

== History ==
It was abolished in 1974 when it was redistributed.

State Constituency	Area
State Constituency	1959
Grik	Gerik; Kenering; Lawin; Pengkalan Hulu; Temenggor

=== Representation history ===
Members of the Legislative Assembly for Grik
Assembly	No	Years	Name	Party
Constituency created
1st	N01	1959-1960	Mohamed Ghazali Mohamad	Aliance (UMNO)
2nd	N01	1960-1964	Din Jusoh	Aliance (UMNO)
2nd	N01	1964-1969	Md. Nor Md. Dahan	Aliance (UMNO)
		1969-1971	Assembly dissolved	
3rd	N01	1969-1971	Wan Mohamed Wan Teh	Alliance (UMNO)
3rd	N01	1971-1974	Wan Mohamed Wan Teh	BN (UMNO)
Constituency abolished, split into Temengor and Kenering

== Election results ==
Perak state election, 1969
Party	Candidate	Votes	%	∆%
Alliance	Wan Mohamed Wan Teh	6,687	72.41	▲8.63
PAS	Md Arif Yaacob	2,548	27.59	▲14.53
Total valid votes		9,235	100.00	
Total rejected ballots		935		
Unreturned ballots		0		
Turnout		10,170	78.18	▼3.97
Registered electors		13,008		
Majority		4,139	44.82	▲4.21
Alliance hold		Swing		
Source(s) "KEPUTUSAN PILIHAN RAYA NEGERI DEWAN UNDANGAN NEGERI".

Perak state election, 1964
Party	Candidate	Votes	%	∆%
Alliance	Md. Nor Md. Dahan	5,338	63.78	▲2.82
Parti Rakyat Malaysia	Yunus Md. Isa	1,939	23.17	▲23.17
PAS	Salleh Yit	1,093	13.06	▼1.41
Total valid votes		8,370	100.00	
Total rejected ballots		493		
Unreturned ballots		0		
Turnout		8,863	82.16	▲7.76
Registered electors		10,788		
Majority		3,399	40.61	▲4.22
Alliance hold		Swing		
Source(s) "KEPUTUSAN PILIHAN RAYA NEGERI DEWAN UNDANGAN NEGERI".

Perak state by-election, 8 June 1960 Upon the resignation of incumbent on appointment as Malaya's ambassador in Cairo, Mohamed Ghazali Mohamad
Party	Candidate	Votes	%	∆%
Alliance	Din Jusoh	4,195	60.96	▼10.68
PPP	Huin Swee Leong	1,691	24.57	▲7.89
PAS	Ahmad Yusof bin Md Ali	996	14.47	▲2.79
Total valid votes		6,882	100.00	
Total rejected ballots		48		
Unreturned ballots		0		
Turnout		6,930	74.40	▲9.92
Registered electors		9,315		
Majority		2,504	36.38	▼18.57
Alliance hold		Swing		
Source(s) "KEPUTUSAN PILIHAN RAYA KECIL DEWAN UNDANGAN NEGERI".

Perak state election, 1959
Party	Candidate	Votes	%
Alliance	Mohamed Ghazali Mohamad	4,607	71.64
PPP	Huin Swee Leong	1,073	16.68
PAS	Abu Bakri	751	11.68
Total valid votes		6,431	100.00
Total rejected ballots		124	
Unreturned ballots		0	
Turnout		6,555	64.48
Registered electors		10,166	
Majority		3,534	54.95
This was a new constituency created.
Source(s) "KEPUTUSAN PILIHAN RAYA NEGERI DEWAN UNDANGAN NEGERI".
