= Mustaffa Kamil Ayub =

Malaysian politician

Mustaffa Kamil Ayub is Malaysian politician from PKR Perak. He was the Vice-President of PKR.

== Background ==
Mustaffa has experience as an administrator, chief of student and youth, politics and corporate for more than 30 years. He is a Bachelor of Science (Genetics) (Hons) UKM, Diploma in Education (Mathematics & English) UIAM, Diploma in Islamic Finance, IPI and Bachelor of Political Science, UKM.

During his study in UKM in 1986, he is the student leader of UKM.

He was the Assistant of Registrar and Head of Training Department of UIAM, Political Secretary of Minister of Sports and Youth Malaysia, Director of Perangsang Selangor Berhad Group and Chairman of Academy of Training, Information and Research Selangor.

Started as a student leader of SK Kg. Gajah, he was also the President of Association of Islamic Student, Volleyball Club, President of St. John Ambulance, Chief Supervisor of SMSAH, President of PMUKM, PKPIM, PEPIAT, Chairman of International Conference IIFSO, Exco ABIM Pusat, President of Youth Council of ASEAN, Chairman of Youth Commonwealth Forum, Deputy Chairman of Kongres Rakyat, President of Institut Masyarakat Madani, Director of Yayasan Belia Malaysia and Chairman of Yayasan Saksama Aman.

== Early career ==
In the human resource and training field, he is the Master Trainer Muslim Student Association of Japan, Master Trainer for Student Leadership Training Programme in Brunei, Master Trainer of Young Executive Leadership Programme in Singapore, and often invited to present papers about leadership in Maldives, The Netherlands, Indonesia, Brunei, Singapura, United Kingdom, Trinidad & Tobago, Taiwan and Mongolia, and also in all kinds of seminar and forum in Malaysia. He is a member of Malaysia Training Association, Just World Trust, National Youth Consultative Council, BOD International Youth Centre and Integrity Malaysia.

== Political career ==
He was Deputy Chief of Youth wing, General secretary, Vice president of Keadilan, Chairman of Keadilan Kelantan, Terengganu, Sarawak and Perak. He had also contested in 2008 Malaysian general election and 2013 Malaysian general election, but failed to win any seats.

== Election results ==
Parliament of Malaysia
Year	Constituency	Candidate	Votes	Pct	Opponent(s)	Votes	Pct	Ballots cast	Majority	Turnout
2004	P074 Lumut	Mustaffa Kamil Ayub (PKR)	15,801	36.56%	Kong Cho Ha (MCA)	27,415	63.44%	50,179	11,614	73.23%
2008	P073 Pasir Salak	Mustaffa Kamil Ayub (PKR)	14,240	44.34%	Tajuddin Abdul Rahman (UMNO)	16,928	52.70%	32,119	2,688	75.20%
2013	P073 Pasir Salak	Mustaffa Kamil Ayub (PKR)	17,489	40.17%	Tajuddin Abdul Rahman (UMNO)	24,875	57.15%	43,533	7,386	84.53%

Perak State Legislative Assembly
Year	Constituency	Candidate	Votes	Pct	Opponent(s)	Votes	Pct	Ballots cast	Majority	Turnout
1999	N08 Alor Pongsu	Mustaffa Kamil Ayub (keADILan)	5,236	40.88%	Qamaruz Zaman Ismail (UMNO)	7,005	54.69%	12,809	1,769	63.81%
2008	N48 Sungei Manik	Mustaffa Kamil Ayub (PKR)	6,881	44.42%	Zainol Fadzi Paharudin (UMNO)	8,255	53.29%	15,492	1,374	73.81%

== Books ==
He is the author of 11 books; Gerakan Pelajar-Mahasiswa (1991), Menangani Cabaran (1994), Dinamika Generasi Muda Menangani Cabaran Wawasan 2020 (1995), Leadership Dynamism (1996), Youth Renaissance (1997), Menerajui Perubahan Poltik Malaysia (2001), Masyarakat Madani dan Idealisme Politik (2004), Masa Depan Politik Alternatif (2002), Ahzab Moden dan Masa Depan Islam (2003), Gerakan Subuh (2017) and the latest book Membangun Insan dan Tamadun (2019), and also the editor of several books and magazine.
