= Dato' Keramat LRT station =

Railway station in Kampung Datuk Keramat, Malaysia

Coordinates: 3°09′54″N 101°43′54″E

KJ7 Dato' Keramat
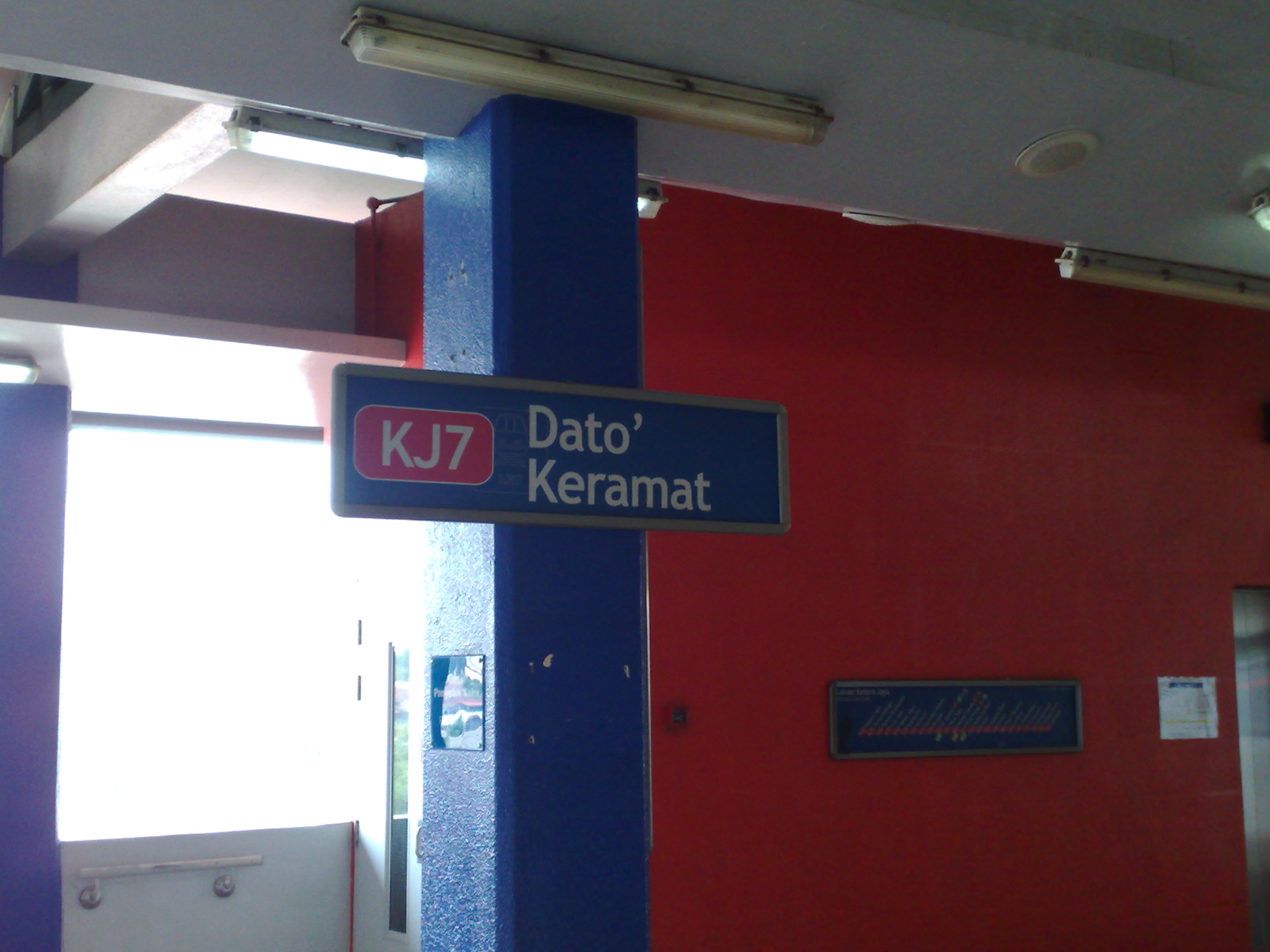

General information
- Other names: Malay: داتوء کرامت (Jawi); Chinese: 拿督克拉末; Tamil: டத்தோ கெராமாட்
- Location: Jalan Datuk Keramat, Kampung Datuk Keramat; 54000 Kuala Lumpur; Malaysia
- System: Rapid KL
- Owner: Prasarana Malaysia
- Operator: Rapid Rail
- Line: 5 Kelana Jaya Line
- Platforms: 2 side platforms
- Tracks: 2

Construction
- Structure type: Elevated
- Parking: Not available

Other information
- Station code: KJ7

History
- Opened: 1 June 1999; 27 years ago

Services
| Preceding station | | Following station |
|---|---|---|
| Jelatek towards Gombak | Kelana Jaya Line | Damai towards Putra Heights |
Location

Dato' Keramat LRT station is a Malaysian light rapid transit (LRT) station that forms part of the LRT Kelana Jaya Line in the Klang Valley.

The LRT station comes from the name of Jalan Datuk Keramat. The intention of the station is to serve Kampung Datuk Keramat and other surrounding areas. Dato Keramat Wet Market, Sekolah Datuk Keramat 1 and Sekolah Kebangsaan Datok Keramat 2 are within walking distance to this station.

As an elevated station, Dato Keramat station contains two levels: The access points at street level, and the ticket area and adjoining platforms on the two elevated levels. All levels are linked via stairways, escalators and elevators designated for disabled passengers.

The station uses two side platforms along two tracks for trains traveling in opposite directions. It is entirely sheltered by a gabled roof supported by latticed frames.

== Trunk buses ==
| Route no. | Origin | Destination | Via | Connecting to |
|---|---|---|---|---|
| 220 | Taman Melawati | Lebuh Ampang | Jalan Taman Melawati; Jalan Melawati 1 Jalan Melawati 2 Caltex Taman Melawati; FT 28 Kuala Lumpur Middle Ring Road 2 (MRR2); Jalan AU 3/1; Jalan Enggang; KJ6 Jelatek; KJ7 Dato' Keramat; Jalan Keramat; Jalan Padang Tembak; Jalan Semarak; Jalan Raja Muda Abdul Aziz; Jalan Tunku Abdul Rahman; Jalan Raja; Lebuh Pasar Besar | 100, 103, 104, 107, 120, 121, 122, 150, 151, 152, 170, 171, 172, 173, 180, 190, 191, 200, 202, 250, 252, 300, 303 |
| 221 (until 1 Jan 2021) | KJ7 Dato' Keramat | Ampang Point | Jalan Enggang; FT 28 Kuala Lumpur Middle Ring Road 2 (MRR2); Jalan Mamanda 9 Jalan Ampang | 253, 300, 303, T300, T301, T302 |
