= Salbiah Mohamed =

Malaysian politician

Yang Berhormat Dato' Salbiah Mohamed DPMP MLA
- سلبية محمد

Member of the Perak State Executive Council
- Incumbent
- Assumed office 22 November 2022
- Monarch: Nazrin Shah
- Menteri Besar: Saarani Mohamad
- Portfolio: Women, Family, Social Welfare & Entrepreneur Development (Note: Assumed portfolios on 23 November 2022 taking office.)
- Preceded by: Wan Norashikin Wan Noordin (Women, Family & Social Welfare); Zainol Fadzi Paharudin (Entrepreneur Development)
- Constituency: Temengor

Member of the Perak State Legislative Assembly for Temengor
- Incumbent
- Assumed office 5 May 2013
- Preceded by: Hasbullah Osman (BN–UMNO)
- Majority: 3,215 (2013); 3,935 (2018); 1,048 (2022)

Personal details
- Born: Salbiah binti Mohamed; 7 May 1978 (age 47) Gerik, Perak, Malaysia
- Citizenship: Malaysian
- Party: United Malays National Organisation (UMNO)
- Other political affiliations: Barisan Nasional (BN)
- Spouse: Mohd Faizal Malek
- Children: 4
- Occupation: Politician

Salbiah binti Mohamed (born 7 May 1978) is a Malaysian politician who has served as Member of the Perak State Executive Council (EXCO) in the Barisan Nasional (BN) state administration under Menteri Besar Saarani Mohamad since November 2022 and Member of the Perak State Legislative Assembly (MLA) for Temengor since May 2013. She is a member of the United Malays National Organisation (UMNO), a component party of the BN coalition. She served as Women Chief of UMNO of Gerik, Women Chief of UMNO of Perak and Women Committee Member of UMNO.

== Politics ==
In 2004, she was appointed the Women's Chief of UMNO Gerik branch. In 2013, she was appointed the Women's Chief of UMNO Perak and also Committee Member of UMNO Women's Wing. She was the Communication Supervisor of KEMAS Pengkalan Hulu and Chairman of Public Library Institution of Perak from 2014 to 2019.

== Family ==
She is the fifth child out of the 11 of her parents and she is now the mother of 4 children and is married to Mohd Faizal Malek.

== Election results ==
Perak State Legislative Assembly
Year	Constituency	Candidate	Votes	Pct	Opponent(s)	Votes	Pct	Ballots cast	Majority	Turnout
2013	N02 Temengor	Salbiah Mohamed (UMNO)	9,331	59.05%	Mhd Supian Nordin (PKR)	6,116	38.70%	15,803	3,215	84.10%
2018	N02 Temengor	Salbiah Mohamed (UMNO)	7,823	49.18%	Md Pozi Md Sani (PAS)	3,888	24.44%	10,910	3,935	77.47%
2018	N02 Temengor	Salbiah Mohamed (UMNO)	7,823	49.18%	Mohd Fadzil Abdul Aziz (BERSATU)	3,806	23.93%	10,910	3,935	77.47%
2022	N02 Temengor	Salbiah Mohamed (UMNO)	8,468	43.12%	Mohd Noor Abdul Rahman (PAS)	7,420	37.79%	19,637	1,048	71.65%
2022	N02 Temengor	Salbiah Mohamed (UMNO)	8,468	43.12%	Ahmad Safwan Mohamad (PKR)	3,749	19.09%	19,637	1,048	71.65%

== Honours ==
- Perak
  - Knight Commander of the Order of the Perak State Crown (DPMP) – Dato' (2023)
