= 2021 Kelana Jaya LRT collision =

Train collision in Malaysia

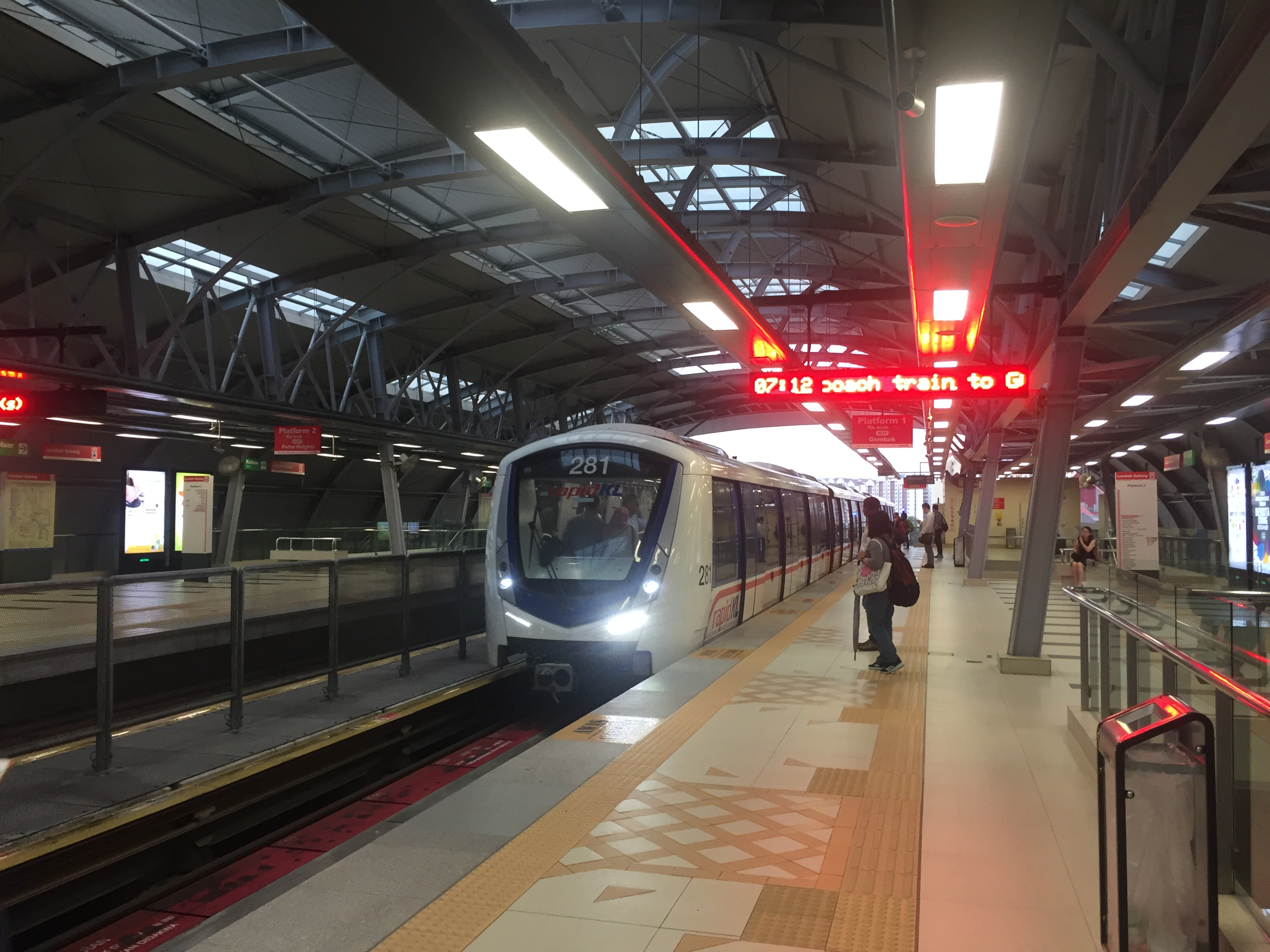
- Set 81, the Bombardier Innovia Metro 300 train involved in the accident.

Details
- Date: 24 May 2021; 5 years ago 20:33 MYT (Malaysia Time)
- Location: Between Kampung Baru LRT Station and KLCC LRT Station
- Coordinates: 03°09′41″N 101°42′28″E
- Country: Malaysia
- Line: Kelana Jaya LRT line
- Operator: Rapid KL
- Incident type: Head-on collision
- Cause: Human error

Statistics
- Trains: 2 (TR40 and TR81)
- Injured: 213 passengers injured: 47 serious injuries; 166 minor injuries

On 24 May 2021, at 20:33 local Malaysia time, a head-on collision occurred between a manually-driven empty train and an automated train carrying passengers, on the Kelana Jaya line between Kampung Baru and KLCC stations in Kuala Lumpur, Malaysia. The collision caused 213 injuries, including 166 minor injuries and 47 serious injuries.

A spokesperson for Hospital Kuala Lumpur stated that by midnight of the same day, the hospital was treating 67 patients, six in critical-care, 19 partially critical and 42 in a non-critical situation. Among the six critically injured include two who underwent brain surgery with a third needing cerebral resuscitation treatment.

This was the first collision to occur on the Kelana Jaya line since services began in 1999, as well as the worst railway accident in Malaysia to date.

== Background ==
Completed in 1999, the LRT Kelana Jaya Line is the fifth rapid transit line in Kuala Lumpur, being Malaysia's first fully-automated rail network, as well as the country's first subway line, forming a part of the Klang Valley Integrated Transit System. The line serviced 37 stations along 46.4 km of grade-separated tracks mostly on underground and elevated guideways. Formerly known as PUTRA-LRT, it is currently operated by Rapid Rail, a subsidiary of Prasarana Malaysia. The section on which the collision occurred is underground and was part of the line's Phase 2 from Pasar Seni to Gombak, which opened in 1999.

The line exclusively uses the rolling stock supplied by Bombardier's Innovia Metro since its inception, which is a driverless automated rapid transit system that operates using Grade of Automation level 4 (GoA-4).

== Trains details and crash ==
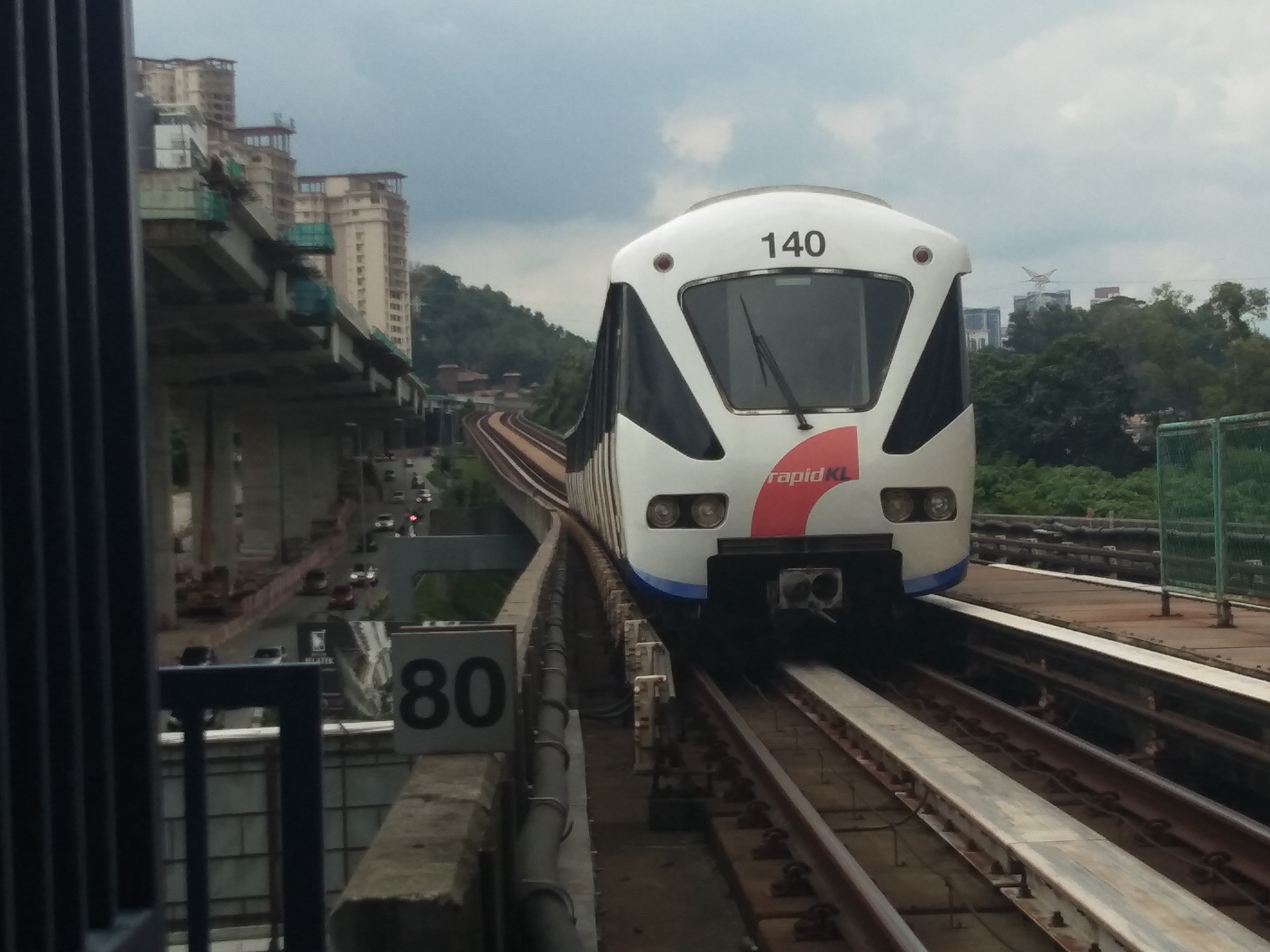
TR40, the train which was involved in the collision

The trains involved were a 4-car Bombardier Innovia Metro 300 train, numbered TR81, that was carrying 213 passengers heading southbound towards Putra Heights, and a 4-car Bombardier ART 200 train, numbered TR40 which was not in service intending to head back to Subang depot for maintenance. The front car of TR81, numbered car 181 and the rear car of TR40, numbered car 240, were badly damaged at the cabs.

== Investigations ==
Investigations were focused on the train hostler who was on board the TR40 as the main cause of the collision. At 6:40 pm, one of the on-board controllers on TR40 failed during service, causing the train to be taken out of service and sent to Subang depot for maintenance. The train was sent automatically as the second controller was still able to operate, however on 8:13 pm, the second controller also failed, causing the train to be stalled in between KLCC and Kampung Baru stations and was unable to contact the control centre.

A hostler was called in to drive the train manually to Dang Wangi station, where the train could be reset and returned to the full automatic operation. During the process, both the hostler and control centre overlooked and missed critical procedures, causing the train to drive on the wrong direction heading northbound to Gombak. At the same time, TR81, which was on hold at KLCC station, was released to proceed to the next station, causing a head-on collision with TR40 on 8:33 pm around 300 metres after KLCC station.

== Reactions and response ==
An initial statement from Dang Wangi District Police Chief, ACP Mohamad Zainal Abdullah states that the collision was likely caused by a miscommunication from the operations centre at Lembah Subang. "The train that was being tested (out of service) should not have been on the same track with the train that was travelling from Gombak," he said adding that the case was being investigated under Section 201 of the Land Public Transportation Act 2010.

Prime Minister Muhyiddin Yassin ordered for passengers injured in the collision to be given first priority in treatment, and also directed the Ministry of Transport and service operator Prasarana Malaysia to commence investigations. Transport Minister Wee Ka Siong said that the collision was the first of its kind in the system's 23 years of operation. The Ministry of Transport (MOT) and Prasarana Malaysia will also discuss the amount of insurance that will be provided to victims. In addition, MOT had set up a special task force to investigate the collision, with the preliminary report passed the next day and a full report passed to MOT two weeks later. The report was presented to Cabinet on 9 June.

== Aftermath ==
The Kelana Jaya line resumed operations at 6:00 am the next day with trains running on a single track between Damai and Pasar Seni stations and supported by feeder buses. 5 units of double-decker buses were brought in to complement the route between Pasar Seni and Ampang Park. These buses run every 15 to 20 minutes and will take passengers between the two stations to any station. The trains involved were recovered on 27 May, earlier than the three days previously promised with track repairs being done along the affected stretch. The line resumed normal operations on 28 May at 3pm, four days after the collision.

Then-chairman of Prasarana Malaysia, Dato' Sri Tajuddin Abdul Rahman said Prasarana Malaysia will offer RM1,000 special assistance to all victims. At a press conference held the next day, Tajuddin further stated that Prasarana will cover all victims' medical expenses till they are discharged.

Following the reduction of train frequencies as a result of new Movement Control Order restrictions, public transit across the nation, including the Kelana Jaya Line, became more overcrowded due to reduced frequency. This sparked dissatisfaction among netizens over concerns of social distancing practices as the nation has continued to see a rise in COVID-19 infections.

On 26 May, the Minister of Finance (Incorporated), the sole shareholder of Prasarana, has confirmed that Tajuddin Abdul Rahman has been removed as the non-executive chairperson of Prasarana with immediate effect due to the way the press conference was handled. In addition, he made racist remarks to a Chinese news reporter that was asking him some questions regarding to the incidents leading up to the head on collision. This comes after a letter perpetuating to originate from the Ministry of Finance penned by Finance Minister Tengku Zafrul Abdul Aziz to Tajuddin Abdul Rahman stating the termination of Tajuddin Abdul Rahman's service to Prasarana as the chairperson had been circulating on social media.

A report has presented in the cabinet on 9 June 2021 for systemic improvements, which include 23 suggestions proposed by the investigation committee.

A section of Train 81 involved in the accident was preserved as part of the Malaysia Agriculture, Horticulture and Agrotourism Exhibition in MAEPS Serdang, Selangor from August 28 to September 6, 2026.

== See also ==
- Rail transport in Malaysia
- List of rail transit stations in the Klang Valley area
