= Temengor =

Political subdivision in Malaysia

Coordinates: 5°19′59″N 101°22′3″E

Temengor (N02)
Perak constituency

State constituency
- Legislature: Perak State Legislative Assembly
MLA
Salbiah Mohamed
BN
- Constituency created: 1974
- First contested: 1974
- Last contested: 2022

Demographics
- Electors (2022): 27,408

Temengor is a state constituency in Perak, Malaysia, that has been represented in the Perak State Legislative Assembly since 1974.

Ethnic breakdown of Temengor's electorate as of 2022
1. Malay (63.2%)
2. Other ethnicities (18.2%)
3. Chinese (17.0%)
4. Indian (1.64%)

== History ==
=== Polling districts ===
According to the federal gazette issued on 31 October 2022, the Temengor constituency is divided into 12 polling districts.

State constituency	Polling districts	Code	Location
Temengor (N02)	Krunei	054/02/01	SK Kerunai
Temengor (N02)	Pekan Grik Barat	054/02/02	SK Sri Adika Raja
Temengor (N02)	Batu Dua	054/02/03	SJK (C) Kg. Bahru Batu Dua
Temengor (N02)	Pekan Grik Timor	054/02/04	SJK (C) Chung Wa
Temengor (N02)	Grik Utara	054/02/05	SK Batu 4
Temengor (N02)	Kuala Rui	054/02/06	SJK (C) Kuala Rui
Temengor (N02)	Bersia	054/02/07	SK Basia Lama
Temengor (N02)	Rancangan FELDA Bersia	054/02/08	SK RKT Bersia
Temengor (N02)	Kampong Bongor	054/02/09	SK Bongor
Temengor (N02)	Sungai Tiang	054/02/10	SK Sungai Tiang; Tabika KEMAS / JAKOA, Kg Sungai Kijar
Temengor (N02)	Banun	054/02/11	SK RPS Banun
Temengor (N02)	Pos Kemar	054/02/12	SK RPS Pos Kemar

=== Representation history ===
Members of the Legislative Assembly for Temengor
Assembly	No	Years	Name	Party
Constituency created from Grik
4th	N01	1974-1978	Wan Mohamed Wan Teh	BN (UMNO)
5th	N01	1978-1982	Shamsuddin Din	BN (UMNO)
6th	N01	1982-1986	Shamsuddin Din	BN (UMNO)
7th	N01	1986-1990	Wan Abdullah Wan Im	BN (UMNO)
8th	N01	1990-1995	Wan Abdullah Wan Im	BN (UMNO)
9th	N02	1995-1999	Mokhtaruddin Mohamad Kaya	BN (UMNO)
10th	N02	1999-2004	Mokhtaruddin Mohamad Kaya	BN (UMNO)
11th	N02	2004-2008	Hasbullah Osman	BN (UMNO)
12th	N02	2008-2013	Hasbullah Osman	BN (UMNO)
13th	N02	2013-2018	Salbiah Mohamed	BN (UMNO)
14th	N02	2018-2022	Salbiah Mohamed	BN (UMNO)
15th	N02	2022–present	Salbiah Mohamed	BN (UMNO)

== Election results ==
Perak state election, 2022: Temengor
Party	Candidate	Votes	%	∆%
BN	Salbiah Mohamed	8,468	43.12	▼6.06
PN	Mohd Noor Abdul Rahman	7,420	37.79	▲37.79
PH	Ahmad Safwan Mohamad	3,749	19.09	▲19.09
Total valid votes		19,637	100.00	
Total rejected ballots		425		
Unreturned ballots		48		
Turnout		20,110	73.37	▼4.10
Registered electors		27,408		
Majority		1,048	5.33	▼19.41
BN hold		Swing		

Perak state election, 2018: Temengor
Party	Candidate	Votes	%	∆%
BN	Salbiah Mohamed	7,823	50.42	▼9.99
PAS	Mohd. Pozi Mohd. Sani	3,888	25.06	▲24.44
PKR	Fadzil Aziz	3,806	24.53	▼15.06
Total valid votes		15,517	97.54	
Total rejected ballots		339	2.13	
Unreturned ballots		52	0.33	
Turnout		15,908	77.47	▼6.63
Registered electors		20,534		
Majority		3,935	24.74	▲3.92
BN hold		Swing		
Source(s) "RESULTS OF CONTESTED ELECTION AND STATEMENTS OF THE POLL AFTER THE OFFICIAL ADDITION OF VOTES".

Perak state election, 2013: Temengor
Party	Candidate	Votes	%	∆%
BN	Salbiah Mohamed	9,331	60.41	▼11.49
PKR	Mohd. Supian Nordin	6,116	39.59	▲11.49
Total valid votes		15,447	97.75	
Total rejected ballots		324	2.05	
Unreturned ballots		32	0.20	
Turnout		15,803	84.10	▲8.58
Registered electors		18,801	20.82	
Majority		3,215	20.82	▲22.98
BN hold		Swing		
Source(s) "KEPUTUSAN PILIHAN RAYA UMUM DEWAN UNDANGAN NEGERI".

Perak state election, 2008: Temengor
Party	Candidate	Votes	%	∆%
BN	Hasbullah Osman	7,578	71.90	▼1.07
PKR	Moon Akau	2,961	28.10	▲1.07
Total valid votes		10,539	96.60	
Total rejected ballots		371	3.40	
Unreturned ballots		0	0.00	
Turnout		10,910	75.52	▲1.14
Registered electors		14,446		
Majority		4,617	43.80	▼30.58
BN hold		Swing		
Source(s) "KEPUTUSAN PILIHAN RAYA UMUM DEWAN UNDANGAN NEGERI PERAK BAGI TAHUN 2008".

Perak state election, 2004: Temengor
Party	Candidate	Votes	%	∆%
BN	Hasbullah Osman	7,180	72.97	▲8.72
PKR	Mohamad Aun Yob Abas	2,190	22.29	▲22.29
Total valid votes		9,370	95.23	
Total rejected ballots		223	2.27	
Unreturned ballots		246	2.50	
Turnout		9,839	74.38	▲7.40
Registered electors		13,228		
Majority		4,990	50.68	▲22.18
BN hold		Swing		
Source(s) "KEPUTUSAN PILIHAN RAYA UMUM DEWAN UNDANGAN NEGERI PERAK BAGI TAHUN 2004".

Perak state election, 1999: Temengor
Party	Candidate	Votes	%	∆%
BN	Mokhtaruddin Mohamad Kaya	4,644	64.25	▼11.25
PAS	Mat Sulaiman Daud	2,584	35.75	▲11.25
Total valid votes		7,228	90.84	
Total rejected ballots		170	2.14	
Unreturned ballots		558	7.01	
Turnout		7,956	66.98	▼4.41
Registered electors		11,879		
Majority		2,060	28.50	▼22.50
BN hold		Swing		
Source(s) "KEPUTUSAN PILIHAN RAYA UMUM DEWAN UNDANGAN NEGERI PERAK BAGI TAHUN 1999".

Perak state election, 1995: Temengor
Party	Candidate	Votes	%	∆%
BN	Mokhtaruddin Mohamad Kaya	6,027	75.50	▲8.05
PAS	Abdul Aziz Jaeh	1,956	24.50	▼8.05
Total valid votes		7,983	92.74	
Total rejected ballots		257	2.99	
Unreturned ballots		368	4.28	
Turnout		8,608	71.41	▲0.06
Registered electors		12,055		
Majority		4,071	51.00	▼16.10
BN hold		Swing		
Source(s) "KEPUTUSAN PILIHAN RAYA UMUM DEWAN UNDANGAN NEGERI PERAK BAGI TAHUN 1995".

Perak state election, 1990: Temengor
Party	Candidate	Votes	%	∆%
BN	Wan Abdullah Wan Im	8,256	67.45	▼1.88
PAS	Haji Md Mat Arif Yaacop	3,984	32.55	▲1.88
Total valid votes		12,240	100.00	
Total rejected ballots		586		
Unreturned ballots		0		
Turnout		12,826	71.35	▲2.51
Registered electors		17,975		
Majority		4,272	34.90	▼3.76
BN hold		Swing		
Source(s) "KEPUTUSAN PILIHAN RAYA UMUM DEWAN UNDANGAN NEGERI PERAK BAGI TAHUN 1990".

Perak state election, 1986: Temengor
Party	Candidate	Votes	%
BN	Wan Abdullah Wan Im	6,367	69.33
PAS	Mohd. Nor Ismail	2,817	30.67
Total valid votes		9,184	100.00
Total rejected ballots		440	
Unreturned ballots		0	
Turnout		9,624	68.84
Registered electors		13,980	
Majority		3,550	38.66
BN hold		Swing	
Source(s) "KEPUTUSAN PILIHAN RAYA UMUM DEWAN UNDANGAN NEGERI PERAK BAGI TAHUN 1986".

Perak state election, 1982: Temengor
Party	Candidate	Votes	%	∆%
On the nomination day, Shamsuddin Din won uncontested.
BN	Shamsuddin Din			
Total valid votes				
Total rejected ballots				
Unreturned ballots				
Turnout				
Registered electors		12,088		
Majority				
BN hold		Swing		

Perak state election, 1978: Temengor
Party	Candidate	Votes	%
BN	Shamsuddin Din	4,591	63.90
PAS	Abdul Rahim Abdullah	1,692	23.55
DAP	Mat Yunos Abdul Munir	902	12.55
Total valid votes		7,185	100.00
Total rejected ballots		265	
Unreturned ballots		0	
Turnout		7,450	76.45
Registered electors		9,745	
Majority		2,899	40.35
BN hold		Swing	

Perak state election, 1974: Temengor
Party	Candidate	Votes	%
On the nomination day, Wan Mohamed Wan Teh won uncontested.
BN	Wan Mohamed Wan Teh		
Total valid votes			
Total rejected ballots			
Unreturned ballots			
Turnout			
Registered electors		7,690	
Majority			
This was a new constituency created.
