= Zainol Fadzi Paharudin =

Malaysian politician (born 1966)

Yang Berhormat Dato' Zainol Fadzi Paharudin DPCM PMP DSM ASDK KMN MLA
- زين الفضي ڤحرالدين

Member of the Perak State Executive Council (Arts, Culture, Youth and Sports : 10 February 2009 – 17 May 2013) (Public Utilities, Infrastructure, Energy and Water : 18 May 2013 – 12 May 2018) (Rural Development, Entrepreneur Development and Cooperatives : 10 December 2020 – 21 November 2022)
- In office 10 December 2020 – 21 November 2022
- Monarch: Nazrin Shah
- Menteri Besar: Saarani Mohamad
- Preceded by: Saarani Mohamad
- Succeeded by: Mohd Zolkafly Harun (Rural Development); Salbiah Mohamed (Entrepreneur Development); Woo Kah Leong (Cooperatives)
- Constituency: Sungai Manik
- In office 10 February 2009 – 12 May 2018
- Monarchs: Azlan Shah (2009–2014); Nazrin Shah (2014–2018)
- Menteri Besar: Zambry Abdul Kadir
- Preceded by: Seah Leong Peng
- Succeeded by: Abdul Yunus Jamahri
- Constituency: Sungai Manik

State Chairman of the Public Accounts Committee of Perak
- Incumbent
- Assumed office 29 December 2022
- Monarch: Nazrin Shah
- Menteri Besar: Saarani Mohamad
- Constituency: Sungai Manik

Advisor to the Menteri Besar of Perak
- In office 8 June 2018 – 4 December 2020
- Monarch: Nazrin Shah
- Menteri Besar: Ahmad Faizal Azumu
- Preceded by: Position established
- Succeeded by: Abd Manaf Hashim

President of the Perak Football Association
- In office 12 May 2010 – 4 October 2015
- Preceded by: Mohammad Nizar Jamaluddin
- Succeeded by: Abdul Puyat Mat Nayan

Member of the Perak State Legislative Assembly for Sungai Manik
- Incumbent
- Assumed office 8 March 2008
- Preceded by: Ibrahim Katop (BN–UMNO)
- Majority: 1,734 (2008); 1,854 (2013); 1,939 (2018); 3,950 (2022)

Faction represented in Perak State Legislative Assembly
- 2008–2018: Barisan Nasional
- 2018–2020: Pakatan Harapan
- 2020: Malaysian United Indigenous Party
- 2020–2026: Perikatan Nasional
- 2026–: Independent

Personal details
- Born: Zainol Fadzi bin Paharudin; 31 July 1966 (age 60) Langkap, Perak, Malaysia
- Citizenship: Malaysian
- Party: United Malays National Organisation (UMNO) (until 2018); Malaysian United Indigenous Party (BERSATU) (2018–2026); National Vision Party (Malaysia) (WAWASAN) (since 2026)
- Other political affiliations: Barisan Nasional (BN) (until 2018); Pakatan Harapan (PH) (2018–2020); Perikatan Nasional (PN) (2020–present)
- Spouse: Azliyatul Wahidah Abu Bakar
- Children: 5 daughters
- Education: Mara Technology University; Universiti Teknologi Malaysia
- Occupation: Politician
- Website: www.adunsgmanik.com

Zainol Fadzi bin Paharudin (born 31 July 1966) is a Malaysian politician who has served as the State Chairman of Public Accounts Committee of Perak since December 2022 and Member of the Perak State Legislative Assembly (MLA) for Sungai Manik since March 2008. He served as Member of the Perak State Executive Council (EXCO) in the Barisan Nasional (BN) state administration under Menteris Besar Zambry Abdul Kadir and Saarani Mohamad from February 2009 to the collapse of the BN state administration in May 2018 for the first term and again from December 2020 to November 2022 for the second term, Advisor to the Menteri Besar of Perak Ahmad Faizal Azumu from June 2018 to December 2020 as well as President of the Perak Football Association from May 2010 to October 2015. He is formerly a Member of the Supreme Council and Division Chief of Pasir Salak of the Malaysian United Indigenous Party (BERSATU), a component party of Perikatan Nasional (PN) coalition and formerly Pakatan Harapan (PH) coalitions and also formerly a member of the United Malays National Organisation (UMNO), a component party of the BN coalition. He served as the State Secretary of BERSATU of Perak from 2018 to November 2024. He's now member of National Vision Party (Malaysia) (WAWASAN) after being fired from BERSATU.

== Education background ==
Zainol Fadzi obtained his Diploma In Business Studies (Marketing) at Mara Technology University in 1987 and Diploma In Business Engineering Management at Universiti Teknologi Malaysia in 1992.

== Election results ==
Parliament of Malaysia
Year	Constituency	Candidate	Votes	Pct	Opponent(s)	Votes	Pct	Ballots cast	Majority	Turnout
2022	P076 Teluk Intan	Zainol Fadzi Paharudin (BERSATU)	17,964	27.98%	Nga Kor Ming (DAP)	33,133	51.61%	65,128	15,169	73.60%
2022	P076 Teluk Intan	Zainol Fadzi Paharudin (BERSATU)	17,964	27.98%	Murugiah Thopasamy (MIC)	12,304	19.04%	65,128	15,169	73.60%
2022	P076 Teluk Intan	Zainol Fadzi Paharudin (BERSATU)	17,964	27.98%	Ahmad Khusyairi Mohamad Tanusi (PEJUANG)	793	1.24%	65,128	15,169	73.60%

Perak State Legislative Assembly
Year	Constituency	Candidate	Votes	Pct	Opponent(s)	Votes	Pct	Ballots cast	Majority	Turnout
2008	N48 Sungei Manik	Zainol Fadzi Paharudin (UMNO)	8,255	53.29%	Mustaffa Kamil Ayub (PKR)	6,881	44.42%	15,492	1,374	73.81%
2013	N48 Sungei Manik	Zainol Fadzi Paharudin (UMNO)	11,047	53.06%	Osman Abdul Rahman (PAS)	9,193	44.16%	20,818	1,854	83.20%
2018	N48 Sungai Manik	Zainol Fadzi Paharudin (UMNO)	9,265	43.48%	Mohamad Maharani Md Tasi (PKR)	7,326	34.38%	21,309	1,939	81.00%
2018	N48 Sungai Manik	Zainol Fadzi Paharudin (UMNO)	9,265	43.48%	Mohamed Yusoff Abdullah (PAS)	4,071	19.11%	21,309	1,939	81.00%
2018	N48 Sungai Manik	Zainol Fadzi Paharudin (UMNO)	9,265	43.48%	Mustapa Kamal Maulut (BERJASA)	169	0.79%	21,309	1,939	81.00%
2022	N48 Sungai Manik	Zainol Fadzi Paharudin (BERSATU)	11,610	43.94%	Mohamad Maharani Md Tasi (PKR)	7,660	28.99%	26,424	3,950	75.95%
2022	N48 Sungai Manik	Zainol Fadzi Paharudin (BERSATU)	11,610	43.94%	Ibrahim Katop (UMNO)	7,154	27.07%	26,424	3,950	75.95%

== Honours ==
=== Honours of Malaysia ===
- Malaysia
  - Officer of the Order of the Defender of the Realm (KMN) (2012)
- Perak
  - Knight Commander of the Order of Cura Si Manja Kini (DPCM) – Dato' (2010)
  - Commander of the Order of the Perak State Crown (PMP) (2005)
- Malacca
  - Member of the Exalted Order of Malacca (DSM) (2006)
- Sabah
  - Companion of the Order of Kinabalu (ASDK)
