= Sungai Manik =

Political subdivision in Malaysia

Sungai Manik (N49)
Perak constituency

State constituency
- Legislature: Perak State Legislative Assembly
MLA
Zainol Fadzi Paharudin
PN
- Constituency created: 1959
- First contested: 1959
- Last contested: 2022

Demographics
- Electors (2022): 35,520

Sungai Manik is a state constituency in Perak, Malaysia, that has been represented in the Perak State Legislative Assembly.

== Demographics ==
Ethnic breakdown of Sungai Manik's electorate as of 2018
1. Malay (66.4%)
2. Chinese (25.1%)
3. Indian (4.88%)
4. Other ethnicities (3.64%)

== History ==
=== Polling districts ===
According to the federal gazette issued on 31 October 2022, the Sungai Manik constituency is divided into 20 polling districts.

| State constituency | Polling Districts | Code | Location |
|---|---|---|---|
| Sungai Manik (N49） | Labu Kubong | 073/49/01 | SK Permatang Pelandok |
| Sungai Manik (N49） | Kunci Ayer Empat | 073/49/02 | SK Sungai Tungku |
| Sungai Manik (N49） | Chenderong Balai | 073/49/03 | SK Dato' Yahya Subban |
| Sungai Manik (N49） | Simpang Empat Balai Polis | 073/49/04 | SMK Sultan Abdullah |
| Sungai Manik (N49） | Kampong SC | 073/49/05 | SA Rakyat Al-Islahiyah Simpang Tiga, Kampong SC Lama Belt |
| Sungai Manik (N49） | Headworks | 073/49/06 | Pusat Latihan Pertanian Degong |
| Sungai Manik (N49） | Parit Satu | 073/49/07 | SK Sg Lampam |
| Sungai Manik (N49） | Parit 13A Sungai Lampam | 073/49/08 | SMK Sungai Manik |
| Sungai Manik (N49） | Parit 3A Sungai Tunku | 073/49/09 | SK Sungai Tungku |
| Sungai Manik (N49） | Kampong Parit 3D | 073/49/10 | SRA Rakyat Madrasah Saadatul Abadiah; SRA Rakyat Islamiah, Parit 3C |
| Sungai Manik (N49） | Permatang | 073/49/11 | SK Permatang |
| Sungai Manik (N49） | Sungai Manik | 073/49/12 | SK Sungai Tukang Sidin |
| Sungai Manik (N49） | Chikus | 073/49/13 | SK Chikus |
| Sungai Manik (N49） | Degong | 073/49/14 | SK Degong |
| Sungai Manik (N49） | Langkap | 073/49/15 | SK Seri Langkap |
| Sungai Manik (N49） | Langkap Tengah | 073/49/16 | SJK (C) Wah Keow |
| Sungai Manik (N49） | Langkap Utara | 073/49/17 | SMK Dato' Sago |
| Sungai Manik (N49） | Pelawan Timor | 073/49/18 | SJK (C) Pelawan |
| Sungai Manik (N49） | Chui Chak | 073/49/19 | SJK (C) Chui Chak |
| Sungai Manik (N49） | Kampong SC Air Hitam | 073/49/20 | SRA Rakyat Al-Hidayah, Kampung Ayer Hitam |

=== Representation history ===
Members of the Legislative Assembly for Sungai Manik
| Assembly | No | Years | Name | Party |
Constituency created
Sungei Manik
| 1st | N11 | 1959-1964 | Yahaya Suban Harun | Alliance (UMNO) |
| 2nd | N11 | 1964-1969 | Yahaya Suban Harun | Alliance (UMNO) |
| | | 1969-1971 | Assembly dissolved | |
| 3rd | N11 | 1969-1971 | Yahaya Suban Harun | Alliance (UMNO) |
| 3rd | N11 | 1971-1974 | Yahaya Suban Harun | BN (UMNO) |
| 4th | N36 | 1974-1978 | Mohamed Yusof Maidin | BN (UMNO) |
| 5th | N36 | 1978-1982 | Mohamed Yusof Maidin | BN (UMNO) |
| 6th | N36 | 1982-1986 | Mohamed Yusof Maidin | BN (UMNO) |
Sungai Manik
| 7th | N37 | 1986-1990 | Mohamed Nazri Abdul Rahim | BN (UMNO) |
| 8th | N37 | 1990-1995 | Mohamed Nazri Abdul Rahim | BN (UMNO) |
| 9th | N42 | 1995-1999 | Mohamed Nazri Abdul Rahim | BN (UMNO) |
| 10th | N42 | 1999-2004 | Mohamed Nazri Abdul Rahim | BN (UMNO) |
| 11th | N48 | 2004-2008 | Ibrahim Katop | BN (UMNO) |
| 12th | N48 | 2008-2013 | Zainol Fadzi Paharudin | BN (UMNO) |
| 13th | N48 | 2013-2018 | Zainol Fadzi Paharudin | BN (UMNO) |
| 14th | N49 | 2018 | Zainol Fadzi Paharudin | BN (UMNO) |
| 14th | N49 | 2018-2020 | Zainol Fadzi Paharudin | PH (BERSATU) |
| 14th | N49 | 2020-2022 | Zainol Fadzi Paharudin | PN (BERSATU) |
| 15th | N49 | 2022–2026 | Zainol Fadzi Paharudin | PN (BERSATU) |
| 15th | N49 | 2026 | Zainol Fadzi Paharudin | Independent |
| 15th | N49 | 2026–present | Zainol Fadzi Paharudin | PN (WAWASAN) |

== Election results ==
Perak state election, 2022: Sungai Manik
| Party | Candidate | Votes | % | ∆% |
|---|---|---|---|---|
| PN | Zainol Fadzi Paharudin | 11,610 | 43.94 | ▲43.94 |
| PH | Mohamad Maharani Md Tasi | 7,660 | 28.99 | ▲28.99 |
| BN | Ibrahim Katop | 7,154 | 27.07 | ▼17.41 |
| Total valid votes | | 26,424 | 100.00 | |
| Total rejected ballots | | 449 | | |
| Unreturned ballots | | 106 | | |
| Turnout | | 26,979 | 75.95 | ▼5.04 |
| Registered electors | | 35,520 | | |
| Majority | | 3,950 | 14.95 | ▲5.64 |
| PN gain from BN | | Swing | | ? |

Perak state election, 2018: Sungai Manik
| Party | Candidate | Votes | % | ∆% |
|---|---|---|---|---|
| BN | Zainol Fadzi Paharudin | 9,265 | 44.48 | ▼10.10 |
| PKR | Mohamad Maharani Md Tasi | 7,326 | 35.17 | ▼10.25 |
| PAS | Mohamed Yusoff Abdullah | 4,071 | 19.54 | ▲19.54 |
| Pan-Malaysian Islamic Front | Mustafa Kamal Maulut | 169 | 0.81 | ▲0.81 |
| Total valid votes | | 20,831 | 97.76 | |
| Total rejected ballots | | 396 | 1.85 | |
| Unreturned ballots | | 82 | 0.38 | |
| Turnout | | 21,309 | 80.99 | ▼2.21 |
| Registered electors | | 26,310 | | |
| Majority | | 1,939 | 9.31 | ▲0.15 |
| BN hold | | Swing | | |
Source(s) "RESULTS OF CONTESTED ELECTION AND STATEMENTS OF THE POLL AFTER THE OFFICIAL ADDITION OF VOTES".

Perak state election, 2013: Sungai Manik
| Party | Candidate | Votes | % | ∆% |
|---|---|---|---|---|
| BN | Zainol Fadzi Paharudin | 11,047 | 54.58 | ▲0.88 |
| PKR | Osman Abdul Rahman | 9,193 | 45.42 | ▼0.88 |
| Total valid votes | | 20,240 | 97.22 | |
| Total rejected ballots | | 516 | 2.48 | |
| Unreturned ballots | | 62 | 0.30 | |
| Turnout | | 20,818 | 83.20 | ▼9.39 |
| Registered electors | | 25,028 | | |
| Majority | | 1,854 | 9.16 | ▲1.76 |
| BN hold | | Swing | | |
Source(s) "KEPUTUSAN PILIHAN RAYA UMUM DEWAN UNDANGAN NEGERI".

Perak state election, 2008: Sungai Manik
| Party | Candidate | Votes | % | ∆% |
|---|---|---|---|---|
| BN | Zainol Fadzi Paharudin | 8,255 | 53.70 | ▼8.59 |
| PKR | Mustaffa Kamil Ayub | 6,881 | 46.30 | ▲46.30 |
| Total valid votes | | 15,136 | 97.70 | |
| Total rejected ballots | | 356 | 2.30 | |
| Unreturned ballots | | 0 | 0.00 | |
| Turnout | | 15,492 | 73.81 | ▲1.26 |
| Registered electors | | 20,990 | | |
| Majority | | 1,374 | 7.40 | ▼17.18 |
| BN hold | | Swing | | |
Source(s) "KEPUTUSAN PILIHAN RAYA UMUM DEWAN UNDANGAN NEGERI PERAK BAGI TAHUN 2008".

Perak state election, 2004: Sungai Manik
| Party | Candidate | Votes | % | ∆% |
|---|---|---|---|---|
| BN | Ibrahim Katop | 9,121 | 62.29 | ▲4.12 |
| PAS | Osman Abdul Rahman | 5,522 | 37.71 | ▼4.12 |
| Total valid votes | | 14,643 | 96.43 | |
| Total rejected ballots | | 489 | 3.22 | |
| Unreturned ballots | | 53 | 0.35 | |
| Turnout | | 15,185 | 72.55 | ▲3.69 |
| Registered electors | | 20,929 | | |
| Majority | | 3,599 | 24.58 | ▲8.34 |
| BN hold | | Swing | | |
Source(s) "KEPUTUSAN PILIHAN RAYA UMUM DEWAN UNDANGAN NEGERI PERAK BAGI TAHUN 2004".

Perak state election, 1999: Sungai Manik
| Party | Candidate | Votes | % | ∆% |
|---|---|---|---|---|
| BN | Mohamed Nazri Abdul Rahim | 8,211 | 58.17 | ▼20.07 |
| PAS | Muhaimin Sulam | 5,904 | 41.83 | ▲20.07 |
| Total valid votes | | 14,115 | 96.39 | |
| Total rejected ballots | | 491 | 3.35 | |
| Unreturned ballots | | 37 | 0.25 | |
| Turnout | | 14,643 | 68.86 | ▲1.46 |
| Registered electors | | 21,264 | | |
| Majority | | 2,307 | 16.34 | ▼40.13 |
| BN hold | | Swing | | |
Source(s) "KEPUTUSAN PILIHAN RAYA UMUM DEWAN UNDANGAN NEGERI PERAK BAGI TAHUN 1999".

Perak state election, 1995: Sungai Manik
| Party | Candidate | Votes | % | ∆% |
|---|---|---|---|---|
| BN | Mohamed Nazri Abdul Rahim | 10,428 | 78.24 | ▲17.17 |
| PAS | Ibrahim Ariffin | 2,901 | 21.77 | ▼17.17 |
| Total valid votes | | 13,329 | 96.05 | |
| Total rejected ballots | | 494 | 3.56 | |
| Unreturned ballots | | 54 | 0.39 | |
| Turnout | | 13,877 | 67.40 | ▼3.76 |
| Registered electors | | 20,590 | | |
| Majority | | 7,527 | 56.47 | ▲34.33 |
| BN hold | | Swing | | |
Source(s) "KEPUTUSAN PILIHAN RAYA UMUM DEWAN UNDANGAN NEGERI PERAK BAGI TAHUN 1999".

Perak state election, 1990: Sungai Manik
| Party | Candidate | Votes | % | ∆% |
|---|---|---|---|---|
| BN | Mohamed Nazri Abdul Rahim | 7,777 | 61.07 | ▼4.58 |
| PAS | Ali Daud | 4,958 | 38.93 | ▲8.95 |
| Total valid votes | | 12,734 | 95.45 | |
| Total rejected ballots | | 607 | 4.55 | |
| Unreturned ballots | | 0 | 0.00 | |
| Turnout | | 13,342 | 71.16 | ▲1.26 |
| Registered electors | | 18,750 | | |
| Majority | | 2,819 | 22.14 | ▼13.50 |
| BN hold | | Swing | | |
Source(s) "KEPUTUSAN PILIHAN RAYA UMUM DEWAN UNDANGAN NEGERI PERAK BAGI TAHUN 1990".

Perak state election, 1986: Sungai Manik
| Party | Candidate | Votes | % | ∆% |
|---|---|---|---|---|
| BN | Mohamed Nazri Abdul Rahim | 7,989 | 65.65 | ▼3.45 |
| PAS | Ibrahim Ariffin | 3,652 | 30.01 | ▼0.89 |
| Independent | Ahmad Zainuddin | 528 | 4.33 | ▲4.34 |
| Total valid votes | | 12,169 | 100.00 | |
| Total rejected ballots | | 553 | | |
| Unreturned ballots | | 0 | | |
| Turnout | | 12,722 | 69.90 | ▼4.45 |
| Registered electors | | 18,200 | | |
| Majority | | 4,337 | 35.64 | ▼2.55 |
| BN hold | | Swing | | |
Source(s) "KEPUTUSAN PILIHAN RAYA UMUM DEWAN UNDANGAN NEGERI PERAK BAGI TAHUN 1986".

Perak state election, 1982: Sungei Manik
| Party | Candidate | Votes | % | ∆% |
|---|---|---|---|---|
| BN | Mohamed Yusof Madin | 8,369 | 69.10 | ▲13.38 |
| PAS | Rais Kadri | 3,743 | 30.90 | ▲7.91 |
| Total valid votes | | 12,112 | 100.00 | |
| Total rejected ballots | | 555 | | |
| Unreturned ballots | | 0 | | |
| Turnout | | 12,667 | 74.35 | ▼1.13 |
| Registered electors | | 17,037 | | |
| Majority | | 4,626 | 38.19 | ▲5.48 |
| BN hold | | Swing | | |

Perak state election, 1978: Sungei Manik
| Party | Candidate | Votes | % | ∆% |
|---|---|---|---|---|
| BN | Mohamed Yusof Madin | 6,088 | 55.72 | ▼9.90 |
| PAS | Kamaruddin Omar | 2,513 | 23.00 | ▲23.00 |
| DAP | Hawari Abdullah | 2,064 | 18.89 | ▼2.22 |
| PMalaysian Social Justice Party | Shaharuddin Dahalan | 262 | 2.40 | ▼10.88 |
| Total valid votes | | 10,927 | 100.00 | |
| Total rejected ballots | | 624 | | |
| Unreturned ballots | | 0 | | |
| Turnout | | 11,551 | 75.48 | ▲3.69 |
| Registered electors | | 15,303 | | |
| Majority | | 3,575 | 32.72 | ▼11.79 |
| BN hold | | Swing | | |

Perak state election, 1974: Sungei Manik
| Party | Candidate | Votes | % | ∆% |
|---|---|---|---|---|
| BN | Mohamed Yusof Madin | 5,931 | 65.62 | ▲65.62 |
| DAP | Abdul Manaff Abdul Samad | 1,908 | 21.11 | ▲21.11 |
| PEKEMAS | Abdul Latif Nasain | 1,200 | 13.28 | ▲13.28 |
| Total valid votes | | 9,039 | 100.00 | |
| Total rejected ballots | | 868 | | |
| Unreturned ballots | | 0 | | |
| Turnout | | 9,907 | 71.79 | ▼1.06 |
| Registered electors | | 13,800 | | |
| Majority | | 4,023 | 44.51 | ▲32.63 |
| BN hold | | Swing | | - |

Perak state election, 1969: Sungei Manik
| Party | Candidate | Votes | % | ∆% |
|---|---|---|---|---|
| Alliance | Yahya Shubban Harun | 3,211 | 55.94 | ▼3.34 |
| PMIP | Abdul Latif Nasain | 2,529 | 44.06 | ▲6.79 |
| Total valid votes | | 5,740 | 100.00 | |
| Total rejected ballots | | 697 | | |
| Unreturned ballots | | 0 | | |
| Turnout | | 6,437 | 72.85 | ▼3.58 |
| Registered electors | | 8,836 | | |
| Majority | | 682 | 11.88 | ▼10.13 |
| Alliance hold | | Swing | | |

Perak state election, 1964: Sungei Manik
| Party | Candidate | Votes | % | ∆% |
|---|---|---|---|---|
| Alliance | Yahya Shubban Harun | 3,296 | 59.28 | ▲4.95 |
| PMIP | Rais Kadri | 2,072 | 37.27 | ▼8.41 |
| UDP | Zaharullail Md. Salleh | 192 | 3.45 | ▲3.45 |
| Total valid votes | | 5,560 | 100.00 | |
| Total rejected ballots | | 341 | | |
| Unreturned ballots | | 0 | | |
| Turnout | | 5,901 | 76.43 | ▲7.58 |
| Registered electors | | 7,721 | | |
| Majority | | 1,224 | 22.01 | ▲13.36 |
| Alliance hold | | Swing | | |

Perak state election, 1959: Sungei Manik
| Party | Candidate | Votes | % |
|---|---|---|---|
| Alliance | Yahya Shubban Harun | 2,178 | 54.33 |
| PMIP | Rais Kadri | 1,831 | 45.67 |
| Total valid votes | | 4,009 | 100.00 |
| Total rejected ballots | | 96 | |
| Unreturned ballots | | 0 | |
| Turnout | | 4,105 | 68.85 |
| Registered electors | | 5,962 | |
| Majority | | 347 | 8.66 |
This was a new constituency created.
