= Damai LRT station (Malaysia) =

Metro station in Kuala Lumpur, Malaysia

KJ8 Damai
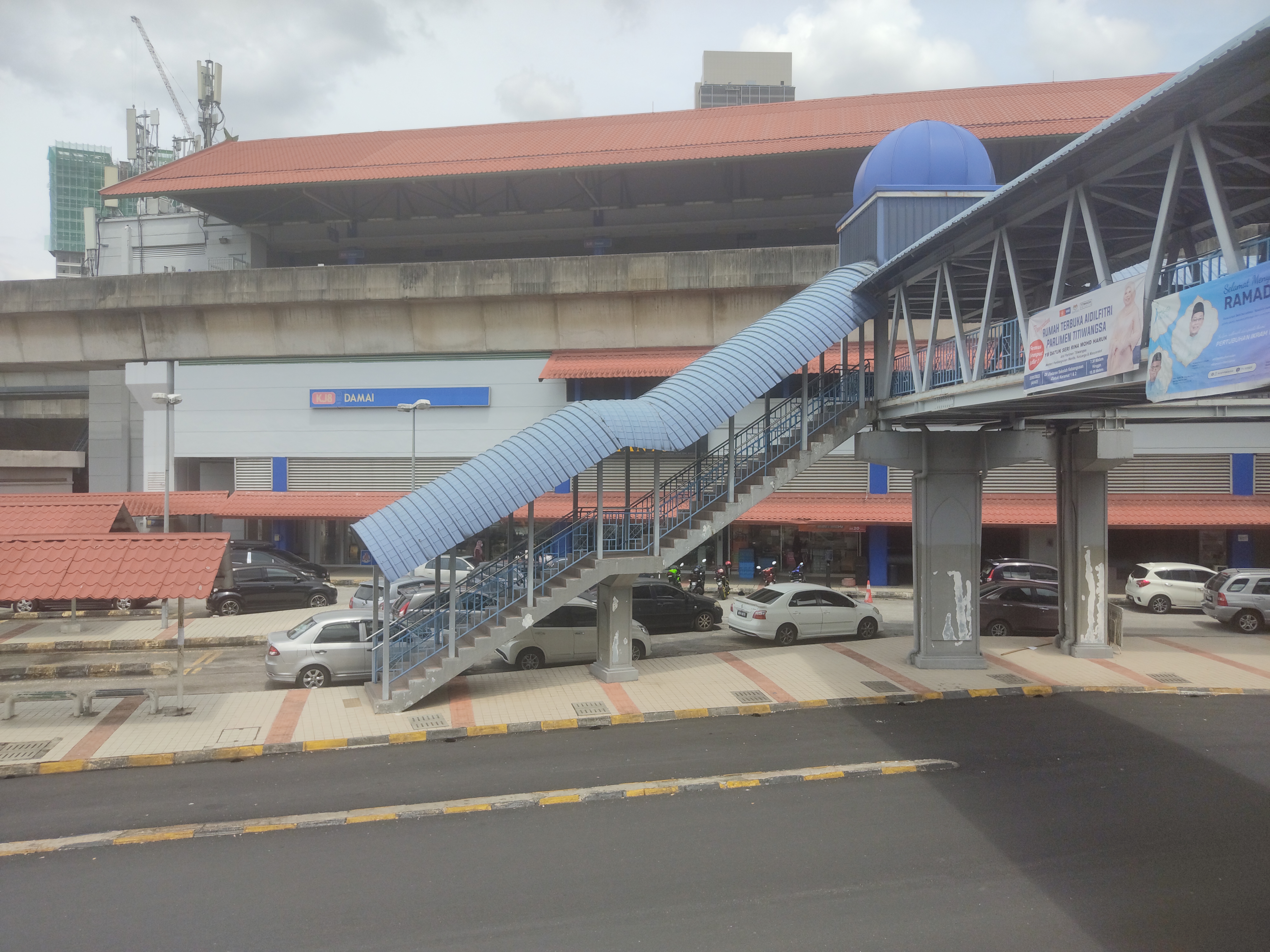

General information
- Other names: Malay: داماي (Jawi); Chinese: 达迈; Tamil: டாமாய்
- Location: Jalan Datuk Keramat, Kampung Datuk Keramat; 54000 Kuala Lumpur; Malaysia
- Coordinates: 3°9′52″N 101°43′27″E
- System: Rapid KL
- Owner: Prasarana Malaysia
- Operator: Rapid Rail
- Line: 5 Kelana Jaya Line
- Platforms: 1 island platform
- Tracks: 2

Construction
- Structure type: Elevated
- Parking: Available with payment: 1236 parking bays; 505 motorcycle bays
- Accessible: Available

Other information
- Station code: KJ8

History
- Opened: 1 June 1999; 27 years ago

Services
Preceding station		Following station
Dato' Keramat towards Gombak	Kelana Jaya Line	Ampang Park towards Putra Heights
Location

Damai LRT station is an elevated light rapid transit (LRT) station in Kuala Lumpur, Malaysia, forming part of the LRT Kelana Jaya Line. The station was opened on 1 June 1999, as part of the line's second segment from Pasar Seni to Gombak.

== Location ==
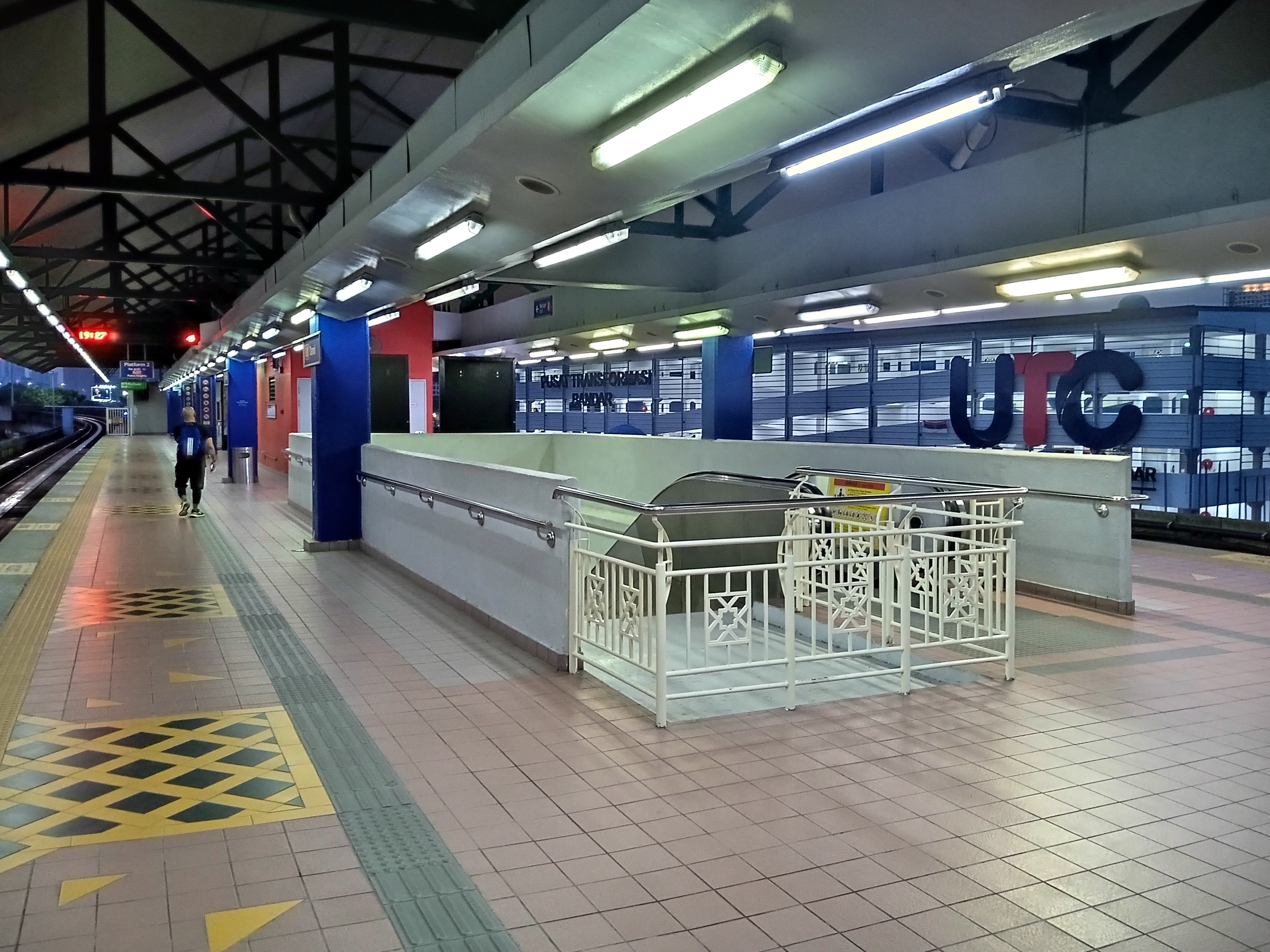
The platform level of Damai station

The station is located in the central core of Datuk Keramat village, in east Kuala Lumpur, along the northern banks of the Klang River and the Ampang–Kuala Lumpur Elevated Highway (AKLEH), thus facing Jalan Datuk Keramat (Malay; English: Datuk Keramat Road) to the north. The station is named after the enclosed Datuk Keramat precinct of Damai, which encompasses the southern half of Datuk Keramat south from the Klang River and is linked to the station via a pedestrian bridge crossing the river. The Urban Transformation Centre (UTC) Keramat and Food Court is directly situated across the station from Jalan Datuk Keramat, being connected via a linkbridge.

The station is one of three Kelana Jaya Line stations serving the Datuk Keramat area, the other two being Dato' Keramat and the Jelatek towards Gombak. Damai is currently intended to serve the east side of Datuk Keramat closely connected to Jalan Tun Razak to the east via the adjoining Jalan Gurney and Jalan Semarak, and eastern Damai.

Damai station is also the first above-ground station after Ampang Park towards Gombak.

== Design ==
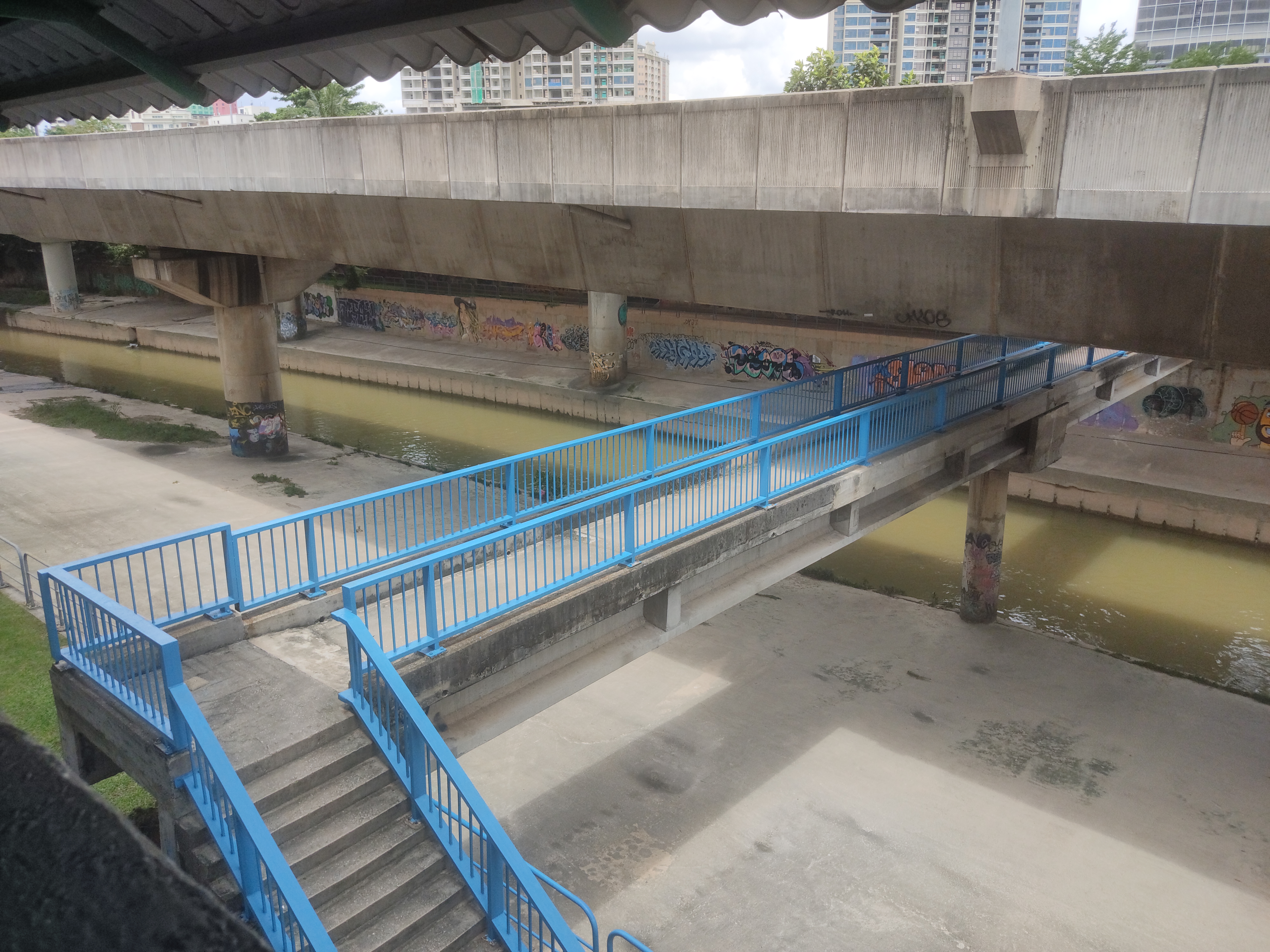
Link bridge connecting Damai LRT station to Jalan Damai

As an elevated station, Damai station contains three levels: The access points at street level, and the ticket area and adjoining platforms on the two elevated levels. All levels are linked via stairways, escalators and elevators designated for disabled passengers. The station utilises a single island platform for trains travelling in both directions of the line, and is entirely sheltered by a gabled roof supported by latticed frames, similar to Asia Jaya station.

== Incident ==
On 9 September 2016, a power trip resulted in a train stopping in between Dato' Keramat and Damai station. Passengers were evacuated after being stuck in the train for 20 minutes, and having to walk on the tracks towards Damai station.

On 19 April 2018, a pregnant passenger fainted and fell onto the track in the morning as the train approached Damai station's platform. The train was able to stop in time and rescuers provided emergency treatment to the passenger before transporting her to Kuala Lumpur Hospital.

On 27 May 2021, two trains collided between Kampung Baru and KLCC station. This resulted in reduced operations with only single track being used on the stretch from Pasar Seni to Damai station.

Between 9 to 13 November 2022, 16 stations from Kelana Jaya to Ampang Park station were temporarily suspended due to issues with the Automatic Train Control (ATC) system. Upon restoration of services to the affected stations, some stations including Damai station encountered further disruptions on 14 November 2022.

On 5 January 2023, switch failures on the line resulted in disruptions and delays on the line. One of the failures occurred between Damai and Dato' Keramat station at 5:26pm.

On 28 October 2025, train services encountered disruptions due to power supply issues between Putra Heights and Wangsa Maju stations. Ticketing systems were also affected in certain stations including Damai station due to the power supply disruption.

On 27 February 2026, disruptions to the line occurred when a train encountered technical issues at Damai station resulting in the train being withdrawn by the operator.

== See also ==
- Rail transport in Malaysia
