= Tajuddin Abdul Rahman =

Malaysian politician

Yang Berbahagia Dato' Sri Tajuddin Abdul Rahman SSAP DMSM DPMP KMN AMP
- تاج الدين عبدالرحمن
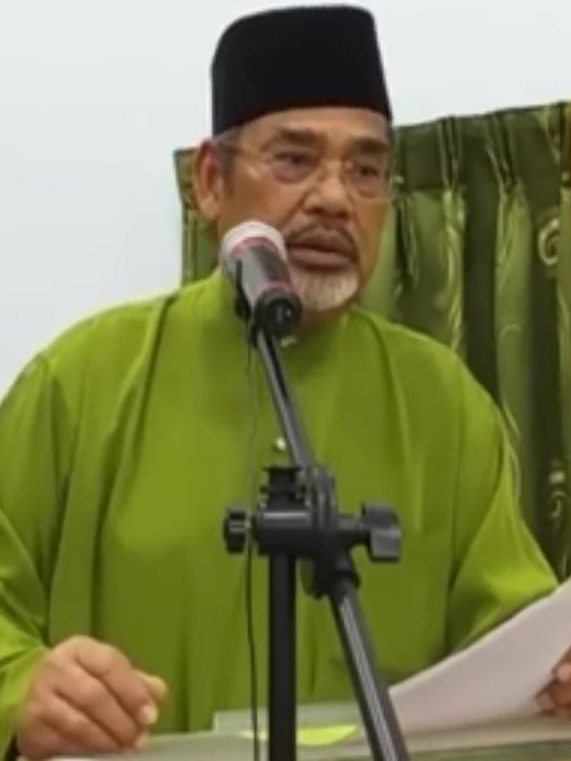
- Tajuddin in 2019

Ministerial roles
- 2013–2018: Deputy Minister of Agriculture and Agro-based Industry

Faction represented in Dewan Rakyat
- 2008–2022: Barisan Nasional

Faction represented in Perak State Legislative Assembly
- 2004–2008: Barisan Nasional

Other roles
- 2008–2013: Chairman of FELCRA
- 2020–2021: Chairman of Prasarana Malaysia
- 2021–2022: Chairman of the Government Backbenchers Club

Personal details
- Born: Tajuddin bin Abdul Rahman; 17 January 1948 (age 78) Perak, Malayan Union (now Malaysia)
- Party: United Malays National Organisation (UMNO) (1975–1995, 1998–2022, suspended: 2022–2024, since 2024); Parti Melayu Semangat 46 (S46) (1995–1998)
- Other political affiliations: Barisan Nasional (BN) (1975–1995, 1998–2022, suspended:2022–2024, since 2024)
- Spouse: Rohkiah Abdul Samat
- Children: 4 (include Firdaus Tajuddin, Faisal Tajuddin)
- Education: University of Malaya (BEc)
- Occupation: Politician
- Website: tajuddinpps.blogspot.my
- Tajuddin Abdul Rahman on Facebook; Tajuddin Abdul Rahman on Parliament of Malaysia

Tajuddin bin Abdul Rahman (Jawi: تاج الدين بن عبدالرحمن; born 17 January 1948) is a Malaysian politician who served as Member of Parliament (MP) for Pasir Salak from March 2008 to November 2022, Deputy Minister of Agriculture and Agro-based Industry in the Barisan Nasional (BN) administration under former Prime Minister Najib Razak and former Ministers Ismail Sabri Yaakob and Ahmad Shabery Cheek from May 2013 to the collapse of BN administration in May 2018 and Member of the Perak State Legislative Assembly (MLA) for Kampong Gajah from March 2004 to March 2008. He is a member of the United Malays National Organisation (UMNO), a component party of the BN coalition. He also served as member of the supreme council of UMNO before his removal from the position in June 2022.

== Background ==
Tajuddin hails from Kampung Gajah, Pasir Salak, Perak. He attended school at Seri Perak Secondary School, Teluk Intan and then obtained his Bachelor of Economics degree from University of Malaya.

== Politics ==
Tajuddin has been in politics since the early 1980s around Chenderong Balai, Kampung Gajah, Pasir Salak and Teluk Intan. He became Head of UMNO Youth Division Pasir Salak (1982–1988) and as UMNO Youth Movement Exco from 1986 to 1988.

In 1987, he and UMNO youth lineage gathered at the TPCA Stadium, Kampung Baru, Kuala Lumpur. Following that, he was arrested by Internal Security Act (ISA) under Ops Lalang with Ibrahim Ali, Fahmi Ibrahim and others. He always compared UMNO's struggle with Dato Maharaja Lela's struggle against colonial British and its Resident, James W.W. Birch's assassination in Pasir Salak.

In 1988 after the establishment of UMNO Baru, he was barred from re-joining UMNO for being accused of joining Semangat 46. However, in 1990 he was re-accepted as a member of UMNO after the allegations were baseless.

In 1995, he was sacked by the UMNO Supreme Council for involvement in money politics of RM6 million for the post of Pasir Salak division chief who was then held by Perak Menteri Besar Ramli Ngah Talib. At that time, Datuk Seri Anwar Ibrahim became Deputy Prime Minister and strongly supported Ramli. In 1998 he was re-elected to UMNO unconditionally and was elected as Pasir Salak UMNO deputy leader without contest in 2000. In UMNO's Pasir Salak division internal leadership conflict, he had backed Megat Junid Megat Ayub against Ramli.

In the 2004 General Election, he contested and defeated Pan-Malaysian Islamic Party (PAS) candidate in the Perak state assembly seat of Kampong Gajah. At the UMNO annual general assembly in September 2004, he was selected by Perak UMNO to debate the economic proposal.

== GLCs chairman ==
On 22 September 2008, Tajuddin was appointed Chairman of FELCRA Berhad (2008 – 2013), a government-owned GLC company, prior to his deputy minister appointment.

Tajuddin was appointed as the chairman of Prasarana Malaysia Berhad (Prasarana) by the Perikatan Nasional (PN) on 1 May 2020. On 26 May 2021, the Ministry of Finance (MOF) terminated his tenure as the non-executive chairman of Prasarana following his controversial way of handling a press conference regarding the 2021 Kelana Jaya LRT collision involving 2 LRTs just the day before.

== Ambassador of Malaysia to Indonesia ==
Despite being rejected by Jakarta in 2021, Tajuddin was successfully appointed the Ambassador of Malaysia to Indonesia by Prime Minister Ismail Sabri Yaakob in May 2022. He was set to set foot on Jakarta after receiving formal appointment by The Yang di-Pertuan Agong on 20 June 2022. However, the swearing-in ceremony for him to be appointed to the position was delayed and he was not sworn in. This left this appointment unclear to date as a result of the lack of clarification on the issue. On 11 July 2022, media reports suggested that he had been dropped quoting sources from the government. On 13 July 2022, Prime Minister Ismail Sabri Yaakob said that Tajuddin would issue a statement clarifying the issue. On 15 July 2022, he stated that he would abide by whatever decisions the government makes but did not confirm the authenticity of him being dropped.

== Controversies and issues ==
Tajuddin has been described as an "outspoken" MP for his notoriously brash nature and abrasive language. He is known of his long history of controversy and uncouth behaviour throughout his political career.

Tajuddin was sacked from UMNO in 1995 following allegations that he had paid RM6 million to secure his position as a division chief who was tied to allegations of corruption in the award of a RM1.3 billion 23-year concession to his company to build the MARA University of Technology (UiTM) Tapah campus. He is notorious for releasing controversial statements such as threatening "to slap" Malaysian Chinese citizens who take their complaints outside Malaysia.

In a debate in the Dewan Rakyat on 6 May 2008, Tajuddin pledged to sue Azmin Ali from PKR if he continues to convict him with the 'six million dollar man' controversy for the purpose of gaining the post of UMNO division chief. He also claimed to be sacked from UMNO by Anwar Ibrahim then because Anwar wanted to become Prime Minister of Malaysia.

On 5 November 2008, he described then opposition MP M. Kulasegaran a "bastard" and a "bloody bastard" in Parliament because Kulasegaran had claimed that Tajuddin "was hated by Indians in Pasir Salak". Tajuddin also had challenged Kulasegaran to "settle outside the House of Commons". He also labelled Kulasegaran "rude". However, the Deputy Speaker of Dewan Rakyat, Wan Junaidi Tuanku Jaafar distracting Tajuddin to take back his bad word. However, both of them retracted the word. and was cited for making sexual innuendos.

On 13 April 2010, Dewan Rakyat Speaker Pandikar Amin Mulia warned Tajuddin for threatening M. Kulasegaran (DAP-Ipoh Barat) outside the Dewan Rakyat on 8 April 2010. The two were summoned to give an explanation of the alleged blackmail incident. They are supposed to maintain the integrity of parliament. Tajuddin disputed Kulasegaran's actions on blogging sites to defame him and persecute him.

On 31 March 2016, Tajuddin again courted controversy when he publicly defended Prime Minister of Malaysia Najib Razak and his wife, Rosmah Mansor for their extravagant lifestyle. He told reporters at Parliament that it is perfectly normal to purchase expensive handbags for significant others to court them. He continued to defend the Prime Minister and his wife's extravagant spending and luxury vacations in response to media reports by whistle-blower Sarawak Report.

On 21 November 2016, Tajuddin faced criticism when he said "The only woman with a 'Kok' (slang as vulgar word) is in Seputeh", referring to Teresa Kok, Democratic Action Party (DAP) MP for Seputeh. However, he was defended by the Deputy Speaker Ronald Kiandee, who dismissed it as a reference to her name, not a vulgarity. MP for Shah Alam Khalid Samad became involved in a heated argument with Tajuddin over his rude remark. MP for Shah Alam Khalid Samad remarks him as "sial" and "menteri sial" several times at Tajuddin and then Tajuddin says "kepala hotak kau" and "rude" in Malay language several times at MP for Shah Alam. On 24 November 2016, a group of Tajuddin supporters from Pasir Salak including his sons entered the restricted area of the Malaysian Parliament to insult and assault Khalid, who was not hurt as he was shielded by security guards. a group of Tajuddin supporters mention the bad word as "pukimak" which is a profanity in the Malay language. According to Khalid during a brief press briefing, these guards were receiving punches aimed at himself. A video shows the event where MP Khalid was attacked inside the compound of Malaysian Parliament. In April 2017, eight of the rioters including Tajuddin's son Firdaus Tajuddin were charged and punished under Section 14 of the Act which only meted out a maximum punishment of RM100 fine by the court.

Tajuddin was on 25 May 2018 accused of criminal breach of trust by abusing his powers as Felcra Bhd chairman and misusing the Felcra fund in a police report was lodged against him by Mohamad Maharani Md Tasi, a government retiree.

On 24 May 2021, a head-on collision between LRT No.240 and No.181 involving 213 passengers occurred between the KLCC and Kampung Baru stations. Out of 67 who were brought to Hospital Kuala Lumpur, 6 were in critical condition; 16 in semi-critical condition while 42 were non-critical. Tajuddin conducted a controversial press conference on the next day in his capacity as Prasarana Chairman to address the situation. While introducing the key people there, he refer to the woman to the left of him as 'Cantik molek'. He is also seen visibly unprepared to present most of the facts in regards to the incident. When asked about the situation in the tunnel, he said, "Normal... only the two cars are together... they kissed each other..." And then, he appeared to laugh at his "joke". To a question on keeping passengers safe from COVID-19 while being treated at the hospital, Tajuddin hit back at a foreign correspondent who asked this question by telling her: “You don’t make assumptions, all kinds of assumptions,”. He also asked the reporter where she was from, twice. When the reply came, he said, "China. No wonder lah." He also failed to wear a face mask during the press conference and was fined RM1,500 for flouting the standard operating procedure (SOP) of Movement Control Order (MCO) by the police. Former Prime Minister Najib Razak said that Tajuddin admitted his mistake in the press conference, and said that Tajuddin would resign on a date to be determined by UMNO. Meanwhile, a petition for Tajuddin's resignation gets 100,000 signatures in less than 24 hours. He was later sacked by the MOF with immediate effect on 26 May 2021. He responded to his sacking with the following controversial remark: "Want to terminate, terminate then. What is the issue? What is the matter? Want to terminate, terminate lah. Thank you lah. I can do other work".

During the train disastrous incident, a video of a luxury mansion, dubbed as a 'palace' owned by Tajuddin at the elite Bukit Damansara, has been viral in the social media. On 28 May 2021, a day aftermath, Tajuddin was arrested and released on conditional bail by the Malaysian Anti-Corruption Commission (MACC) regarding two charges of abuse of power over his son-in-law's Prasarana appointment.

On 20 July 2022, he uttered an offensive Malaysia vulgar word "pukimak" during the debate on Anti-Sexual Harassment bill in Parliament, targeting at various opposition female lawmakers. He was given a warning by the speaker for that.

== Health ==
In January 2021, Tajuddin was tested positive for COVID-19. He has recovered and was discharged from Sungai Buloh Hospital about a week later.

== Election results ==
Perak State Legislative Assembly
Year	Constituency	Candidate	Votes	Pct	Opponent(s)	Votes	Pct	Ballots cast	Majority	Turnout
2004	N49 Kampong Gajah	Tajuddin Abdul Rahman (UMNO)	10,352	64.21%	Mustafa Shaari (PAS)	5,335	33.09%	16,123	5,137	73.19%

Parliament of Malaysia
Year	Constituency	Candidate	Votes	Pct	Opponent(s)	Votes	Pct	Ballots cast	Majority	Turnout
2008	P073 Pasir Salak	Tajuddin Abdul Rahman (UMNO)	16,928	52.70%	Mustaffa Kamil Ayub (PKR)	14,240	44.34%	32,119	2,688	75.20%
2013	P073 Pasir Salak	Tajuddin Abdul Rahman (UMNO)	24,875	57.14%	Mustaffa Kamil Ayub (PKR)	17,489	40.17%	43,533	7,386	84.50%
2018	P073 Pasir Salak	Tajuddin Abdul Rahman (UMNO)	20,003	46.04%	Salihuddin Radin Sumadi (BERSATU)	12,291	28.29%	44,508	7,712	81.41%
2018	P073 Pasir Salak	Tajuddin Abdul Rahman (UMNO)	20,003	46.04%	Zafarulazhan Zan (PAS)	11,151	25.67%	44,508	7,712	81.41%

== Honours ==
=== Honours of Malaysia ===
- Malaysia
  - Officer of the Order of the Defender of the Realm (KMN) (2006)
- Malacca
  - Companion Class I of the Exalted Order of Malacca (DMSM) – Datuk (2003)
- Perak
  - Member of the Order of the Perak State Crown (AMP) (1985)
  - Knight Commander of the Order of the Perak State Crown (DPMP) – Dato' (2007)
- Pahang
  - Grand Knight of the Order of Sultan Ahmad Shah of Pahang (SSAP) – Dato' Sri (2013)

== See also ==
- Pasir Salak (federal constituency)
- 2021 Kelana Jaya LRT collision
