= Kampung Datuk Keramat =

Village in Kuala Lumpur, Malaysia

Coordinates: 3.1678535°N 101.7244839°E

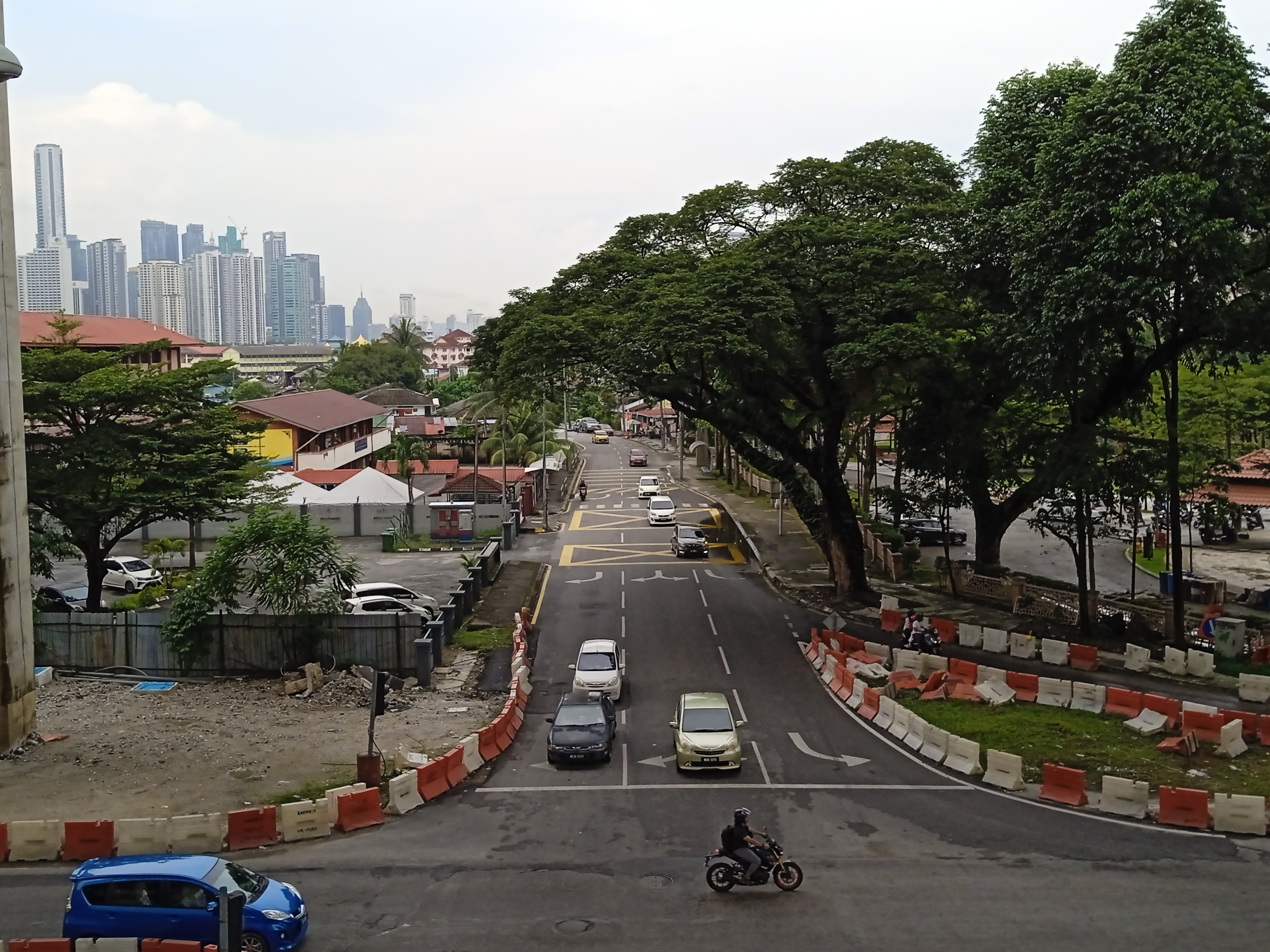
Jalan Keramat Dalam in Kampung Datuk Keramat in 2023.

Kampung Datuk Keramat, commonly referred to as Keramat (old name Tangga Cina) is a large zone in the Titiwangsa constituency, falling within the boundary of the Federal Territory of Kuala Lumpur, Malaysia. It is located northeast of downtown Kuala Lumpur and borders the district of Ampang in Selangor. The Klang River runs roughly from northeast to the west and acts as a natural divider of Keramat and Ampang.

Keramat, along with Kampung Baru, which is a 10 minutes drive away, has traditionally been a Malay majority area, being a Malay reserve area.

== Name ==
Kampung Datuk Keramat was once the site of two venerated tombs. One tomb was that of Haji Ali, a Bugis immigrant. Haji Ali's tomb became renown as a Datuk Keramat, until its veneration was stopped in the 1990s. One tomb was that of a pious Summatran immigrant named Sheikh Taih or To' Janggut.

== Education ==
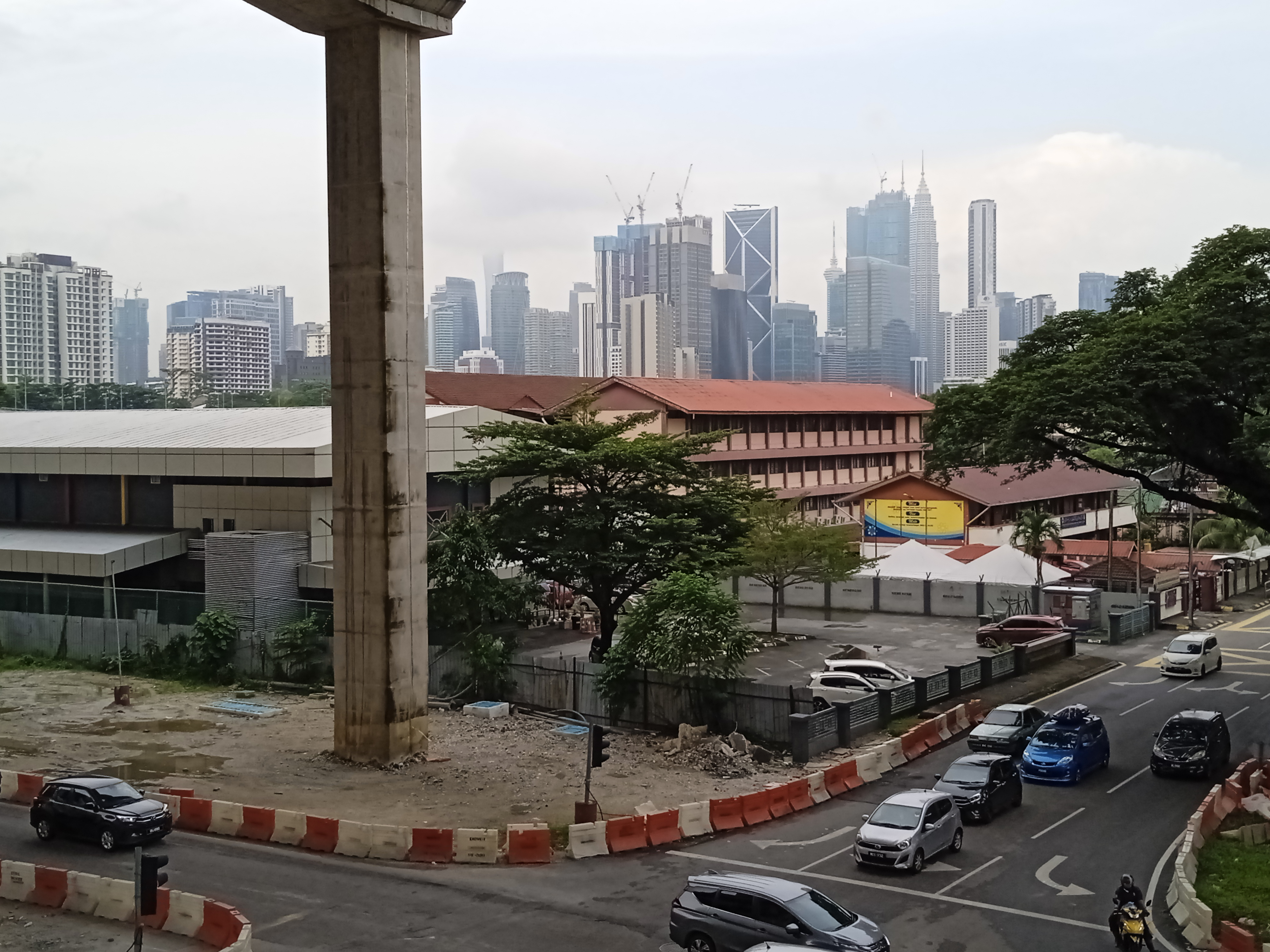
SIRAJ Al-Alusi, 2023.

- Primary Schools

Schools in the area include Sekolah Kebangsaan Datuk Keramat, a primary school. The other nearby school is SK Polis Depot opposite to SK Jalan Padang Tembak, SK Jalan Gurney near to Utm Semarak and SK Kementah located in Mindef also located in DTHO that share land property with Mindef.

- Secondary Schools

SMK Seri Ampang aka Ampang Boys, to get to this school mostly the students stopped at LRT Datuk Keramat before walking in a bridge connected to Jalan Ampang over the Klang River. SMK Puteri Ampang also located at the same exact location. SMK Jalan Padang Tembak located near to the Pulapol. Meanwhile, SMK Desa Tun Hussein Onn placed in Mindef property land.

Some parents also sent their children to nearby primary and secondary school outside the region such as SK Setiawangsa which known for top education school amongst primary school student and recognized as one of best primary school in KL. SK 2 Taman Keramat in Keramat AU1. There's minority of teenagers there went to secondary school such as in SMK Taman Setiawangsa, SMK Taman Keramat, SMK Wangsa Maju Sesyen 5.

== Transportation ==
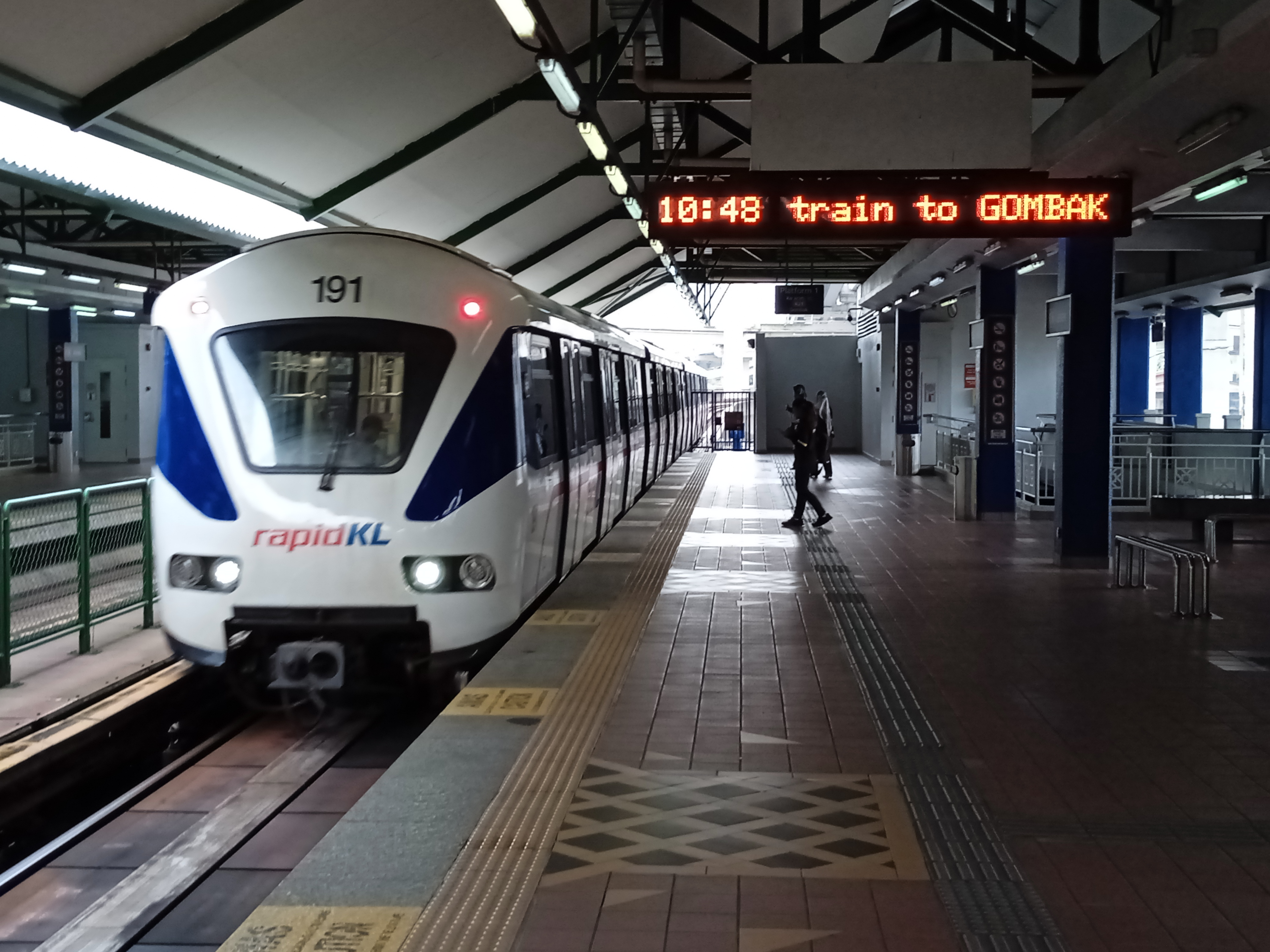
Jelatek LRT station, 2023.

Keramat is served by three light rail transit stations as part of the Kelana Jaya Line. The three stations are Jelatek, Dato' Keramat and Damai.

== Notable people ==
- Razip Ismail – ex footballer, former head coach of KL FA, Harimau muda, Pahang, Perlis, Ministry of finance fc.
- Dato Yusoff Haslam (actor, director & film producer)
- Dato Aznil Haji Nawawi (TV presenter, host & entertainer)
- Awie - musician, singer, actor

== Al-Arqam ==
The religious Cult, Al Arqam began in Datuk Keramat before relocating to Sg Penchala.

== Marketplace ==
=== Keramat Mall ===
Keramat Mall houses a wet market, a dry market, a food court, a multipurpose hall and parking bays. The cost of the project was RM70 million. However, Keramat Mall is far from being the buzzing marketplace it was envisioned to be due to the mall being "neither trader friendly or consumer friendly". In 2013, a Mini Urban Transformation Centre (UTC) was set up in the marketplace.

== Gallery ==
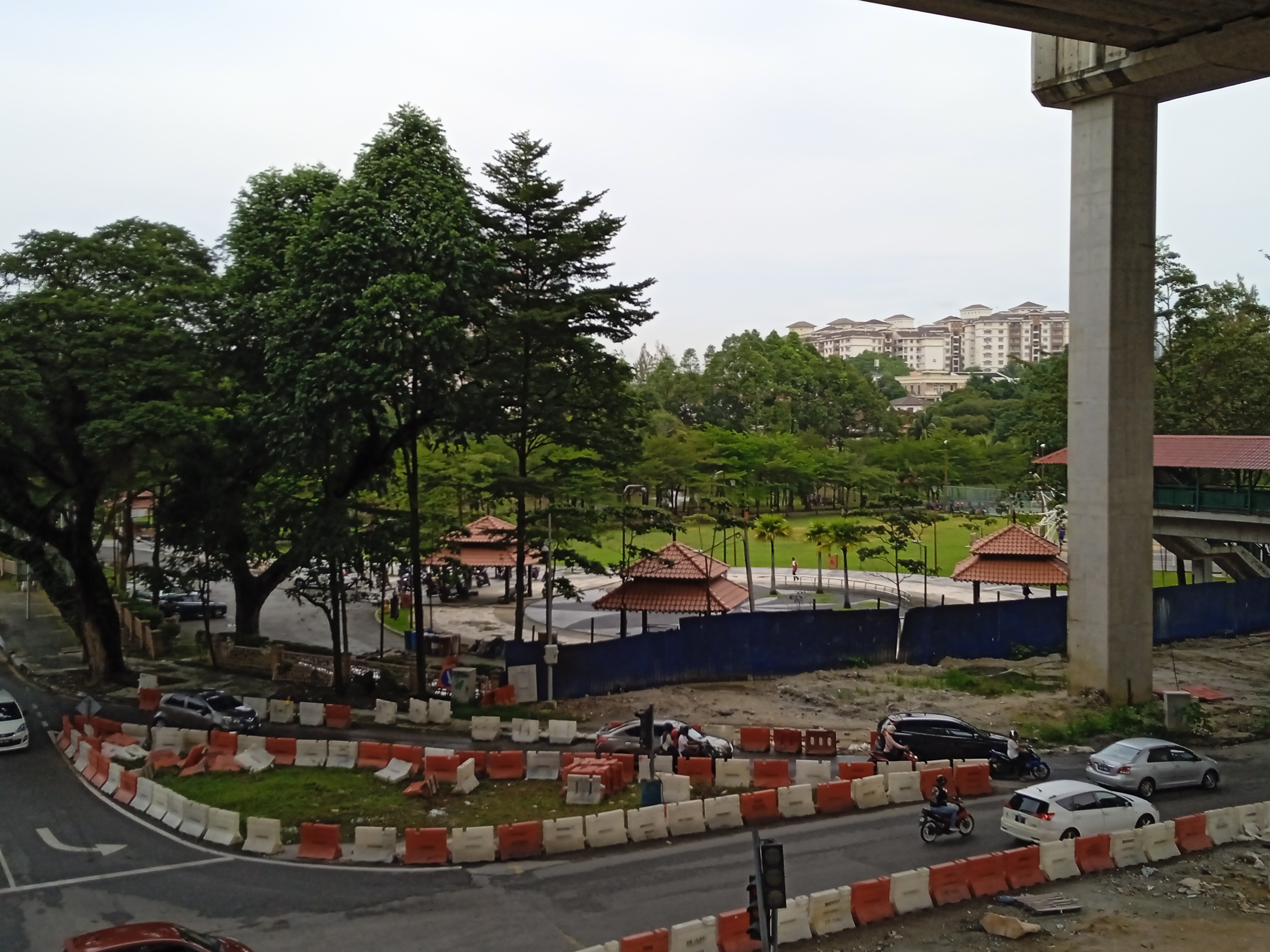
Taman Tasik Keramat, 2023

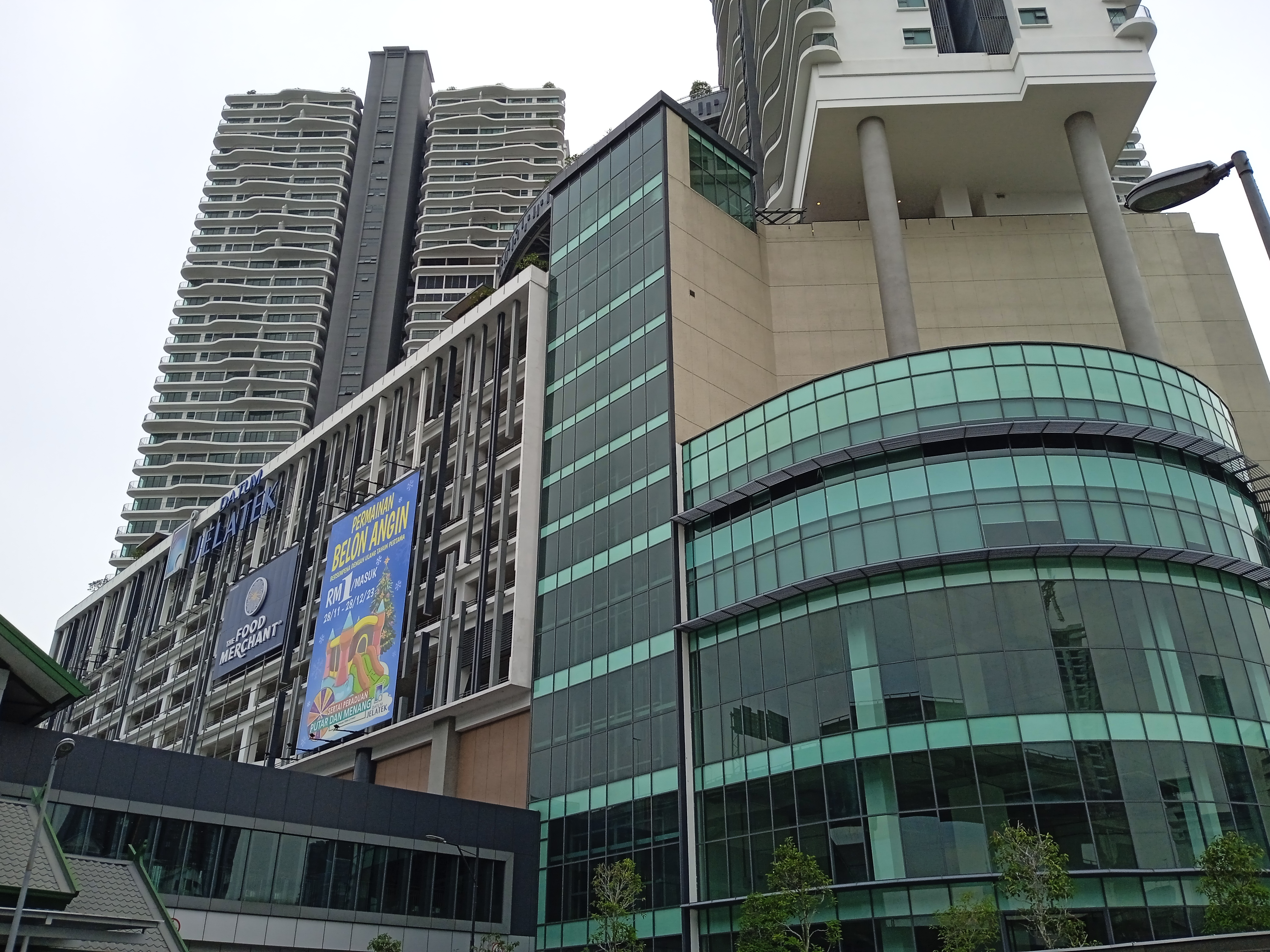
Datum Jelatek, 2023

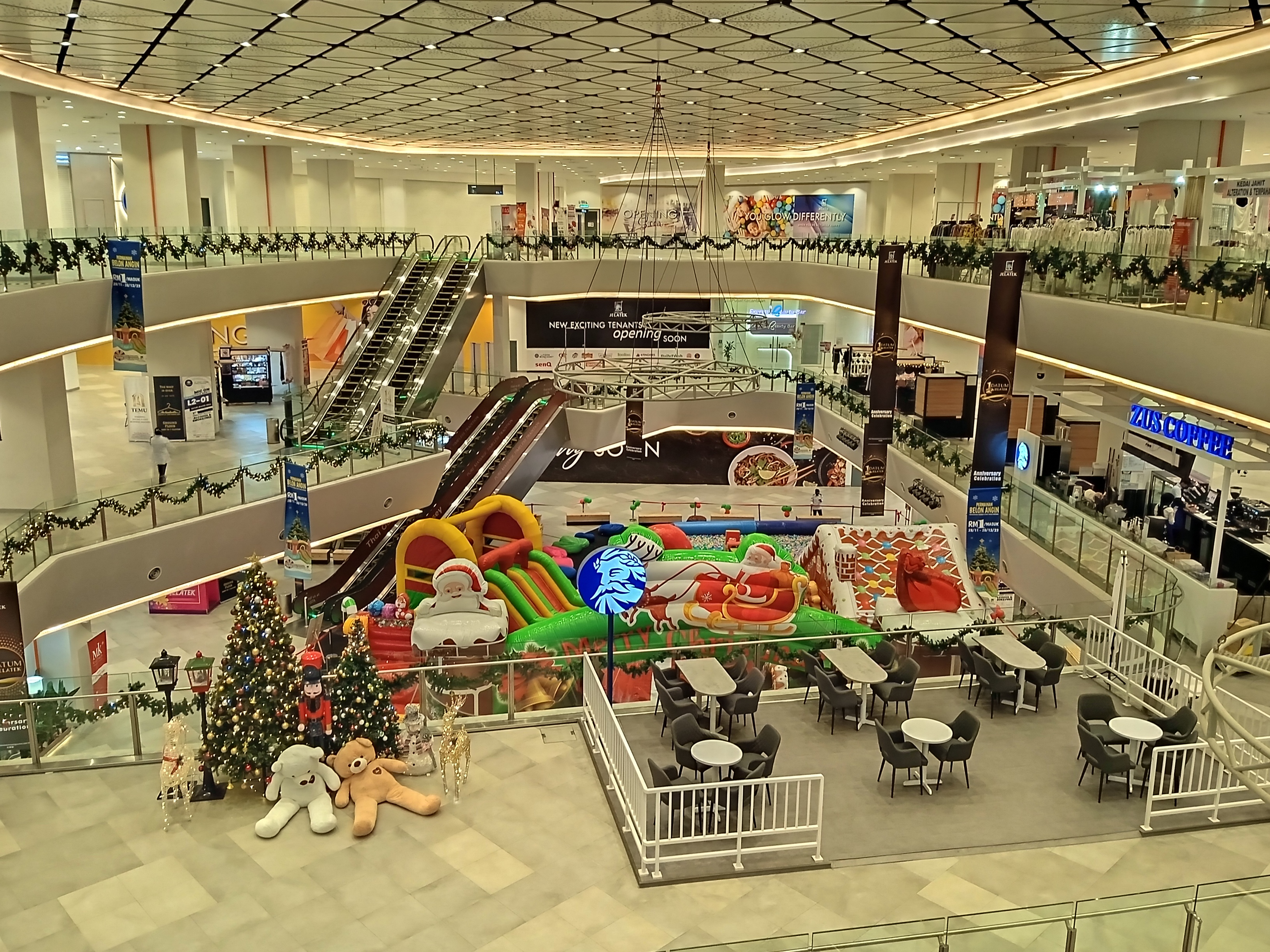
Datum Jelatek interior, 2023

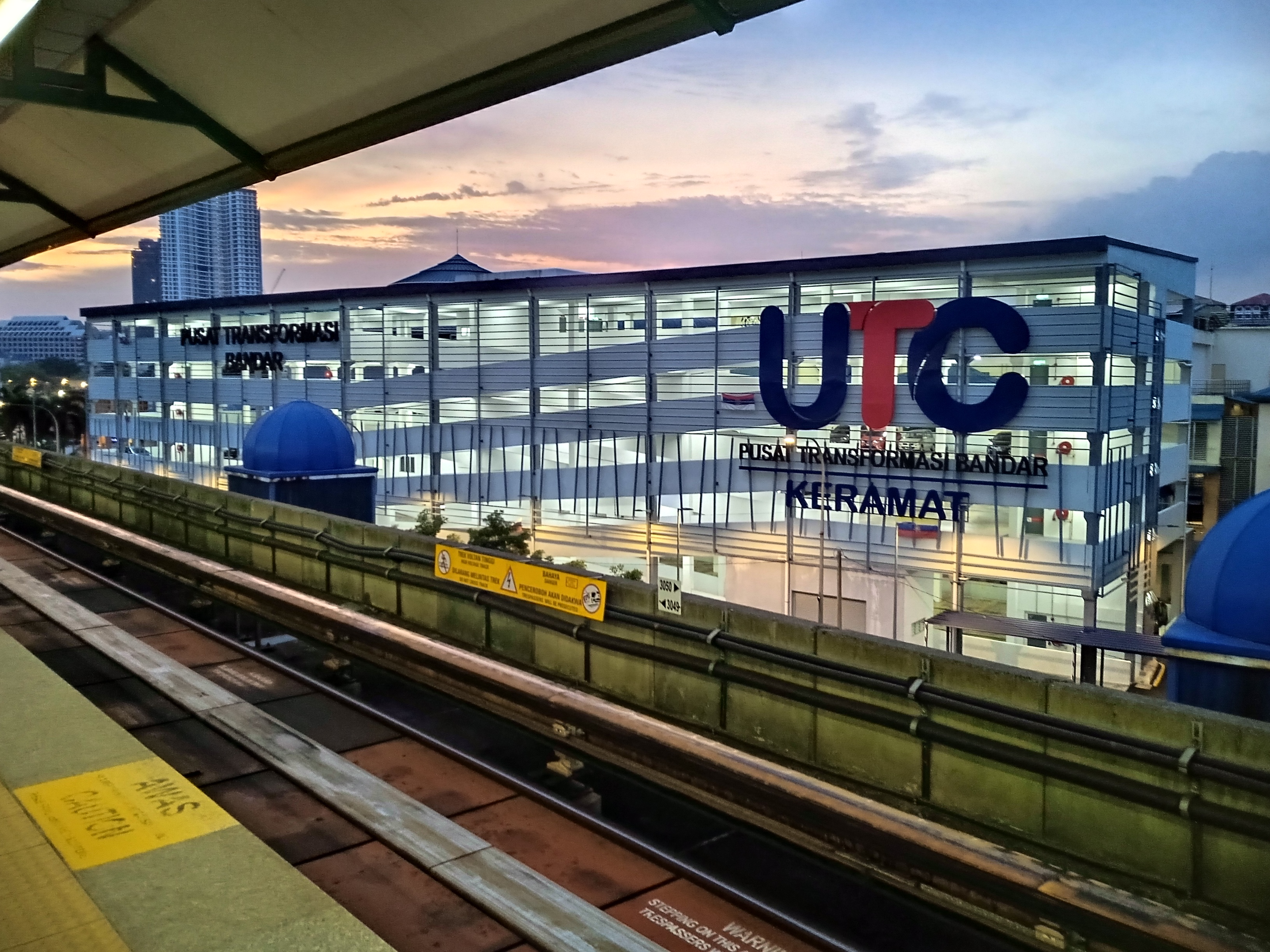
UTC Keramat, 2025

== See also ==
- Kampung Padang Balang
