= Kampong Gajah =

Political subdivision in Malaysia

Kampong Gajah (N50)
Perak constituency

State constituency
- Legislature: Perak State Legislative Assembly
MLA
Zafarulazlan Zan
PN
- Constituency created: 1959
- First contested: 1959
- Last contested: 2022

Demographics
- Electors (2022): 39,241

Kampong Gajah is a state constituency in Perak, Malaysia, that has been represented in the Perak State Legislative Assembly.

== Demographics ==
Ethnic breakdown of Kampong Gajah's electorate as of 2018
1. Malay (94.2%)
2. Other ethnicities (3.50%)
3. Indian (1.79%)
4. Chinese (0.53%)

== History ==
=== Polling districts ===
According to the federal gazette issued on 31 October 2022, the Kampong Gajah constituency is divided into 33 polling districts.

State constituency	Polling Districts	Code	Location
Kampong Gajah (N50)	Telok Sareh	073/50/01	SK Toh Paduka Raja
Kampong Gajah (N50)	Sungai Galah	073/50/02	SK Sungai Galah
Kampong Gajah (N50)	Chenderong Kelubi	073/50/03	SK Chenderong Kelubi
Kampong Gajah (N50)	Changkat Pinggan	073/50/04	SK Sri Changkat
Kampong Gajah (N50)	Kampong Balun Bidai	073/50/05	SK Balun Bidai
Kampong Gajah (N50)	Kampong Setia	073/50/06	SK Dato' Sagor
Kampong Gajah (N50)	Pulau Tiga	073/50/07	SK Raja Chulan
Kampong Gajah (N50)	Kampong Pasir Garam	073/50/08	SK Pasir Kubu
Kampong Gajah (N50)	Kampong Paloh Pachat	073/50/09	SK Pulau Tiga Kiri
Kampong Gajah (N50)	Tanjong Bidara	073/50/10	SK Tanjong Bidara
Kampong Gajah (N50)	Selat Pulau	073/50/11	SK Selat Pulau
Kampong Gajah (N50)	Selat Pulau	073/50/12	SK Selat Pulau
Kampong Gajah (N50)	Kampong Gajah	073/50/13	SMK Dato' Seri Maharaja Lela
Kampong Gajah (N50)	Pasir Salak	073/50/14	SK Tok Pelita
Kampong Gajah (N50)	Pasir Jeneris	073/50/15	SK Bandar Tua
Kampong Gajah (N50)	Pulau Juar	073/50/16	SK Pulau Juar
Kampong Gajah (N50)	Kampong Pulau Besar	073/50/17	SK Pasir Panjang Ulu
Kampong Gajah (N50)	Kampong Ayer Mati	073/50/18	SK Bandar
Kampong Gajah (N50)	Bandar	073/50/19	SK Bandar
Kampong Gajah (N50)	Sungai Buaya	073/50/20	SRA Rakyat Al-Tarbitul Islamiah Parit 4 Sungai Buaya
Kampong Gajah (N50)	Bukit Cawi Seberang Perak	073/50/21	SMK Sultan Abdul Jalil Shah
Kampong Gajah (N50)	Bandar Pusat Seberang Perak	073/50/22	SK Changkat Lada 2
Kampong Gajah (N50)	Kampong Sejagop	073/50/23	SA Rakyat Al Riduaniah Al Diniah, Kampong Sejagop
Kampong Gajah (N50)	Kota Setia	073/50/24	SK Kota Setia
Kampong Gajah (N50)	Kampong Sungai Ranggam	073/50/25	SK Sungai Ranggam
Kampong Gajah (N50)	Sungai Jejawi	073/50/26	SK Sungai Jejawi
Kampong Gajah (N50)	Ladang Seberang	073/50/27	SJK (T) Ladang Sabarang
Kampong Gajah (N50)	Kampong Sungai Durian	073/50/28	SK Sungai Durian
Kampong Gajah (N50)	Ladang Rubana Bahagian 2	073/50/29	SJK (T) Ladang Rubana 1
Kampong Gajah (N50)	Kampong Sungai Rubana	073/50/30	SK Sungai Rusa
Kampong Gajah (N50)	Sungai Besar	073/50/31	SK Sungai Besar
Kampong Gajah (N50)	Tanjong Kubu	073/50/32	SRA Rakyat Marta'il Ulum Tanjong Sari
Kampong Gajah (N50)	Kampong Telok Baharu	073/50/33	SK Seri Baru

=== Representation history ===
Members of the Legislative Assembly for Kampong Gajah
Assembly	No	Years	Name	Party
Constituency created
1st	N18	1959-1964	Ismail Karim	Alliance (UMNO)
2nd	N18	1964-1969	Saudi Zakaria	Alliance (UMNO)
		1969-1971	Assembly dissolved	
3rd	N18	1969-1971	Mahmud Zainal Abidin	PMIP
3rd	N18	1971-1974	Mahmud Zainal Abidin	BN (PMIP)
4th	N35	1974-1978	Sapian Mat Sam	BN (UMNO)
5th	N35	1978-1982	Ramli Ngah Talib	BN (UMNO)
6th	N35	1982-1986	Ramli Ngah Talib	BN (UMNO)
7th	N38	1986-1990	Ramli Ngah Talib	BN (UMNO)
8th	N38	1990-1995	Ramli Ngah Talib	BN (UMNO)
9th	N43	1995-1999	Ramli Ngah Talib	BN (UMNO)
10th	N43	1999-2004	Ainon Kariyah Mohd Abas	BN (UMNO)
11th	N49	2004-2008	Tajuddin Abdul Rahman	BN (UMNO)
12th	N49	2008-2013	Wan Norashikin Wan Noordin	BN (UMNO)
13th	N49	2013-2018	Abdullah Fauzi Ahmad Razali	BN (UMNO)
14th	N50	2018-2022	Wan Norashikin Wan Noordin	BN (UMNO)
15th	N50	2022–present	Zafarulazlan Zan	PN (PAS)

== Election results ==
Perak state election, 2022: Kampong Gajah
Party	Candidate	Votes	%	∆%
PN	Zafarulazhan Zan	15,634	51.03	▲51.03
BN	Wan Norashikin Wan Noordin	11,877	38.77	▼10.12
PH	Mohs Syamsul Alauddin	2,824	9.22	▲9.22
PEJUANG	Mohd Safian Sauri Pandak Abd Samad	299	0.98	▲0.98
Total valid votes		30,634	100.00	
Total rejected ballots		463		
Unreturned ballots		141		
Turnout		31,238	79.61	▼2.19
Registered electors		39,241		
Majority		3,757	12.26	▼2.60
PN gain from BN		Swing		?

Perak state election, 2018: Kampong Gajah
Party	Candidate	Votes	%	∆%
BN	Wan Norashikin Wan Noordin	11,026	48.89	▼14.86
PAS	Mustafa Shaari	7,681	34.03	▼2.22
PKR	Zaiton Latiff	3,861	17.11	▲17.11
Total valid votes		22,568	97.28	
Total rejected ballots		547	2.36	
Unreturned ballots		83	0.36	
Turnout		23,198	81.80	▼4.00
Registered electors		28,361		
Majority		3,345	14.86	▼12.64
BN hold		Swing		
Source(s) "RESULTS OF CONTESTED ELECTION AND STATEMENTS OF THE POLL AFTER THE OFFICIAL ADDITION OF VOTES".

Perak state election, 2013: Kampong Gajah
Party	Candidate	Votes	%	∆%
BN	Abdullah Fauzi Ahmad Razali	14,140	63.75	▲9.49
PAS	Ishak Saari	8,040	36.25	▼9.49
Total valid votes		22,180	97.64	
Total rejected ballots		440	1.70	
Unreturned ballots		95	0.14	
Turnout		22,715	85.80	▲9.27
Registered electors		26,470		
Majority		6,100	27.50	▲18.88
BN hold		Swing		
Source(s) "KEPUTUSAN PILIHAN RAYA UMUM DEWAN UNDANGAN NEGERI".

Perak state election, 2008: Kampong Gajah
Party	Candidate	Votes	%	∆%
BN	Wan Norashikin Wan Noordin	8,818	54.26	▼11.73
PAS	Mustafa Shaari	7,402	45.64	▲11.73
Total valid votes		16,220	97.57	
Total rejected ballots		401	2.41	
Unreturned ballots		3	0.02	
Turnout		16,624	76.53	▲3.34
Registered electors		21,722		
Majority		1,416	8.62	▼23.37
BN hold		Swing		
Source(s) "KEPUTUSAN PILIHAN RAYA UMUM DEWAN UNDANGAN NEGERI PERAK BAGI TAHUN 2008".

Perak state election, 2004: Kampong Gajah
Party	Candidate	Votes	%	∆%
BN	Tajuddin Abdul Rahman	10,352	65.99	▲12.37
PAS	Mustafa Shaari	5,335	34.00	▼12.37
Total valid votes		15,687	97.30	
Total rejected ballots		385	2.39	
Unreturned ballots		51	0.32	
Turnout		16,123	73.19	▲5.10
Registered electors		22,030		
Majority		5,017	31.99	▲24.75
BN hold		Swing		
Source(s) "KEPUTUSAN PILIHAN RAYA UMUM DEWAN UNDANGAN NEGERI PERAK BAGI TAHUN 2004".

Perak state election, 1999: Kampong Gajah
Party	Candidate	Votes	%	∆%
BN	Ainon Kariyah Mohd Abas	7,725	53.62	▼34.38
PAS	Mustafa Shaari	6,682	46.38	▲46.38
Total valid votes		14,407	96.07	
Total rejected ballots		541	3.61	
Unreturned ballots		48	0.32	
Turnout		14,996	68.09	▼3.46
Registered electors		22,024		
Majority		1,416	7.24	▼68.76
BN hold		Swing		
Source(s) "KEPUTUSAN PILIHAN RAYA UMUM DEWAN UNDANGAN NEGERI PERAK BAGI TAHUN 1999".

Perak state election, 1995: Kampong Gajah
Party	Candidate	Votes	%	∆%
BN	Ramli Ngah Talib	11,718	88.00	▲1.40
S46	Mustafa Abdullah	1,598	12.00	▼1.40
Total valid votes		13,316	95.49	
Total rejected ballots		573	4.11	
Unreturned ballots		56	0.40	
Turnout		13,945	64.62	▼6.25
Registered electors		21,581		
Majority		10,120	76.00	▲2.80
BN hold		Swing		
Source(s) "KEPUTUSAN PILIHAN RAYA UMUM DEWAN UNDANGAN NEGERI PERAK BAGI TAHUN 1995".

Perak state election, 1990: Kampong Gajah
Party	Candidate	Votes	%	∆%
BN	Ramli Ngah Talib	11,579	86.60	▲3.06
S46	Arifen Esa	1,792	13.40	▲13.40
Total valid votes		13,371	95.01	
Total rejected ballots		702	4.99	
Unreturned ballots		0	0	
Turnout		14,073	70.87	▲4.60
Registered electors		19,858		
Majority		9,787	73.20	▼6.12
BN hold		Swing		
Source(s) "KEPUTUSAN PILIHAN RAYA UMUM DEWAN UNDANGAN NEGERI PERAK BAGI TAHUN 1990".

Perak state election, 1986: Kampong Gajah
Party	Candidate	Votes	%	∆%
BN	Ramli Ngah Talib	9,538	83.54	▲3.97
PAS	Mokhtar Ngah Ibrahim	1,950	16.46	▼3.97
Total valid votes		11,488	100.00	
Total rejected ballots		671		
Unreturned ballots		0		
Turnout		12,159	66.27	▼4.81
Registered electors		18,347		
Majority		7,588	66.05	▲7.93
BN hold		Swing		
Source(s) "KEPUTUSAN PILIHAN RAYA UMUM DEWAN UNDANGAN NEGERI PERAK BAGI TAHUN 1986".

Perak state election, 1982: Kampong Gajah
Party	Candidate	Votes	%	∆%
BN	Ramli Ngah Talib	8,532	79.06	▲6.30
PAS	Mokhtar Ngah Ibrahim	2,260	20.94	▼1.49
Total valid votes		10,792	100.00	
Total rejected ballots		502		
Unreturned ballots		0		
Turnout		11,294	71.09	▼1.18
Registered electors		15,888		
Majority		6,272	58.12	▲7.80
BN hold		Swing		

Perak state election, 1978: Kampong Gajah
Party	Candidate	Votes	%	∆%
BN	Ramli Ngah Talib	7,251	72.76	▲5.00
PAS	Ishak Abdul Hamid	2,236	22.44	▲22.44
DAP	Zainal Abidin Md. Nusi	360	3.61	▲3.61
PEKEMAS	Chek Ali	119	1.19	▼4.26
Total valid votes		9,966	100.00	
Total rejected ballots		538		
Unreturned ballots		0		
Turnout		10,504	72.27	▲1.56
Registered electors		14,535		
Majority		5,015	50.32	▲3.90
BN hold		Swing		

Perak state election, 1974: Kampong Gajah
Party	Candidate	Votes	%	∆%
BN	Sapian Mat Sam	5,763	67.76	▲23.93
Independent	Osman Abu Bakar	1,815	21.34	▲21.34
PEKEMAS	Mohd. Rus Jaafar	464	5.46	▲5.46
Independent	Beedon Ngah	463	5.44	▲5.44
Total valid votes		8,505	100.00	
Total rejected ballots		950		
Unreturned ballots		0		
Turnout		9,455	70.70	▼4.22
Registered electors		13,373		
Majority		3,948	46.42	▲34.08
BN gain from PAS		Swing		-

Perak state election, 1969: Kampong Gajah
Party	Candidate	Votes	%	∆%
PAS	Mahmud Zainal Abidin	4,262	56.17	▲27.38
Alliance	Ahmad Alias Mohd. Aliff	3,326	43.83	▼6.54
Total valid votes		7,588	100.00	
Total rejected ballots		565		
Unreturned ballots		0		
Turnout		8,153	74.92	▼6.96
Registered electors		10,882		
Majority		936	12.34	▼9.26
PAS gain from Alliance		Swing		-

Perak state election, 1964: Kampong Gajah
Party	Candidate	Votes	%	∆%
Alliance	Saaudi Ahmad Zakaria	3,817	50.38	▼15.59
PAS	Kamarudin Montak	2,181	28.78	▼5.25
UDP	P. Norashid Idris	810	10.69	▲10.69
Independent	Mohd. Hassan Abdul Rais	769	10.15	▲10.15
Total valid votes		7,577	100.00	
Total rejected ballots		253		
Unreturned ballots		0		
Turnout		7,830	81.88	▲3.23
Registered electors		9,563		
Majority		1,636	21.59	▼10.34
Alliance hold		Swing		

Perak state election, 1959: Kampong Gajah
Party	Candidate	Votes	%
Alliance	Ismail Karim	4,514	65.97
PAS	Saaduddin Yahya	2,329	34.03
Total valid votes		6,843	100.00
Total rejected ballots		125	
Unreturned ballots		0	
Turnout		6,968	78.65
Registered electors		8,860	
Majority		2,185	31.93
This was a new constituency created.
