= List of roads in Kuala Lumpur =

Roads in Malaysia

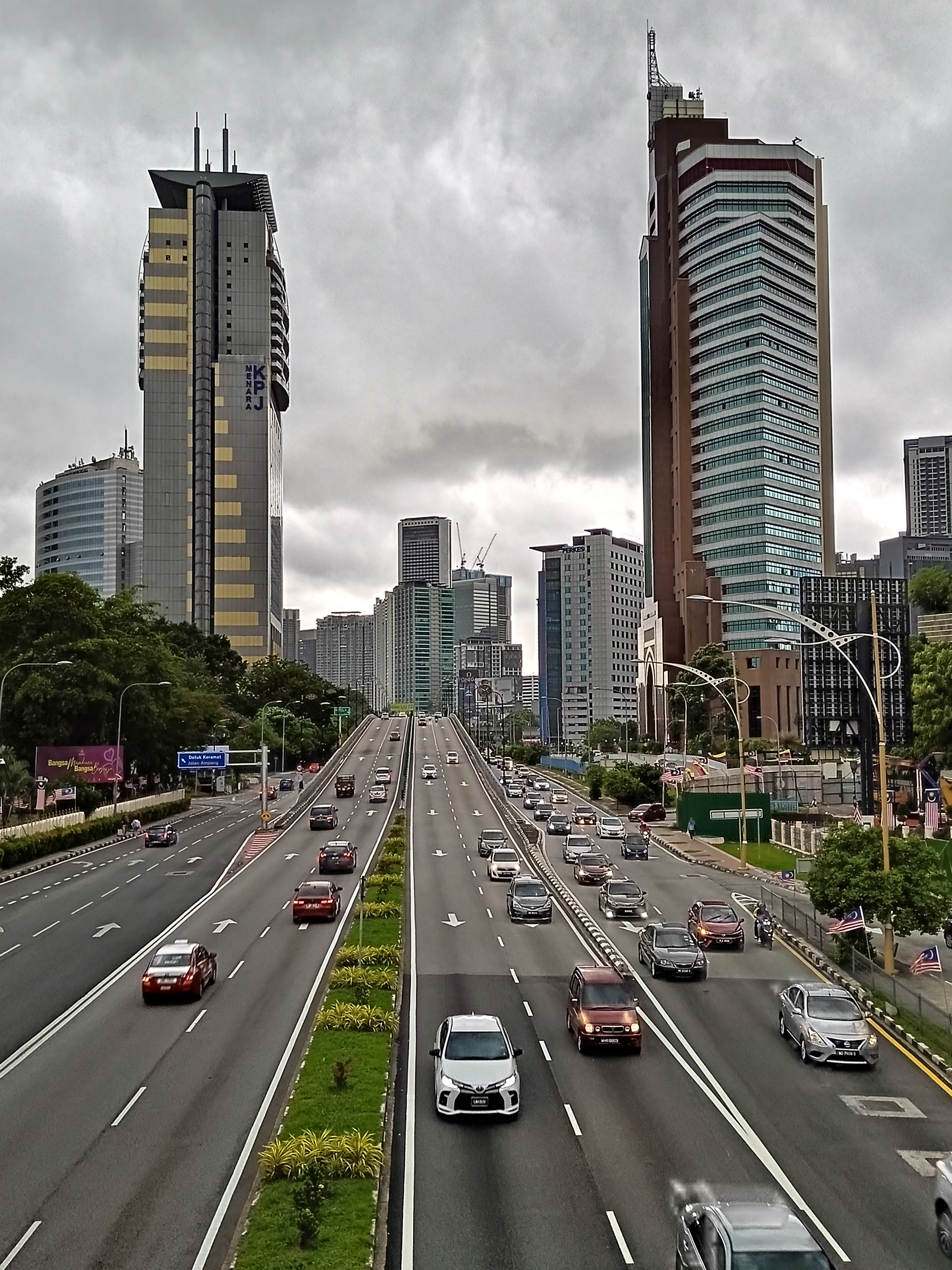
Jalan Tun Razak (formerly Jalan Pekeliling) near National Library of Malaysia.

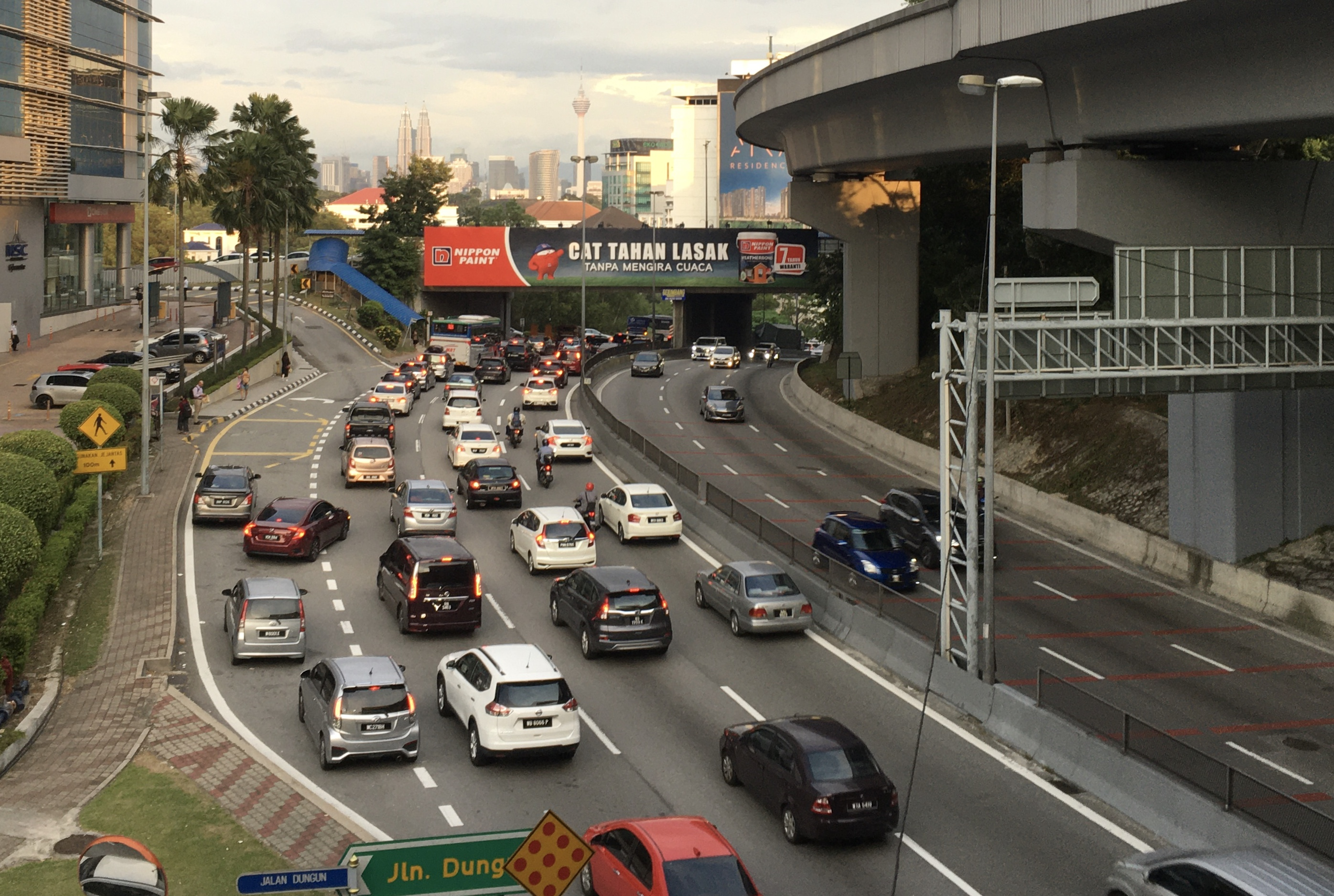
Jalan Semantan looking eastward towards Jalan Tuanku Abdul Halim (Jalan Duta) during rush hour, with the Petronas Twin Towers and KL Tower in the background.

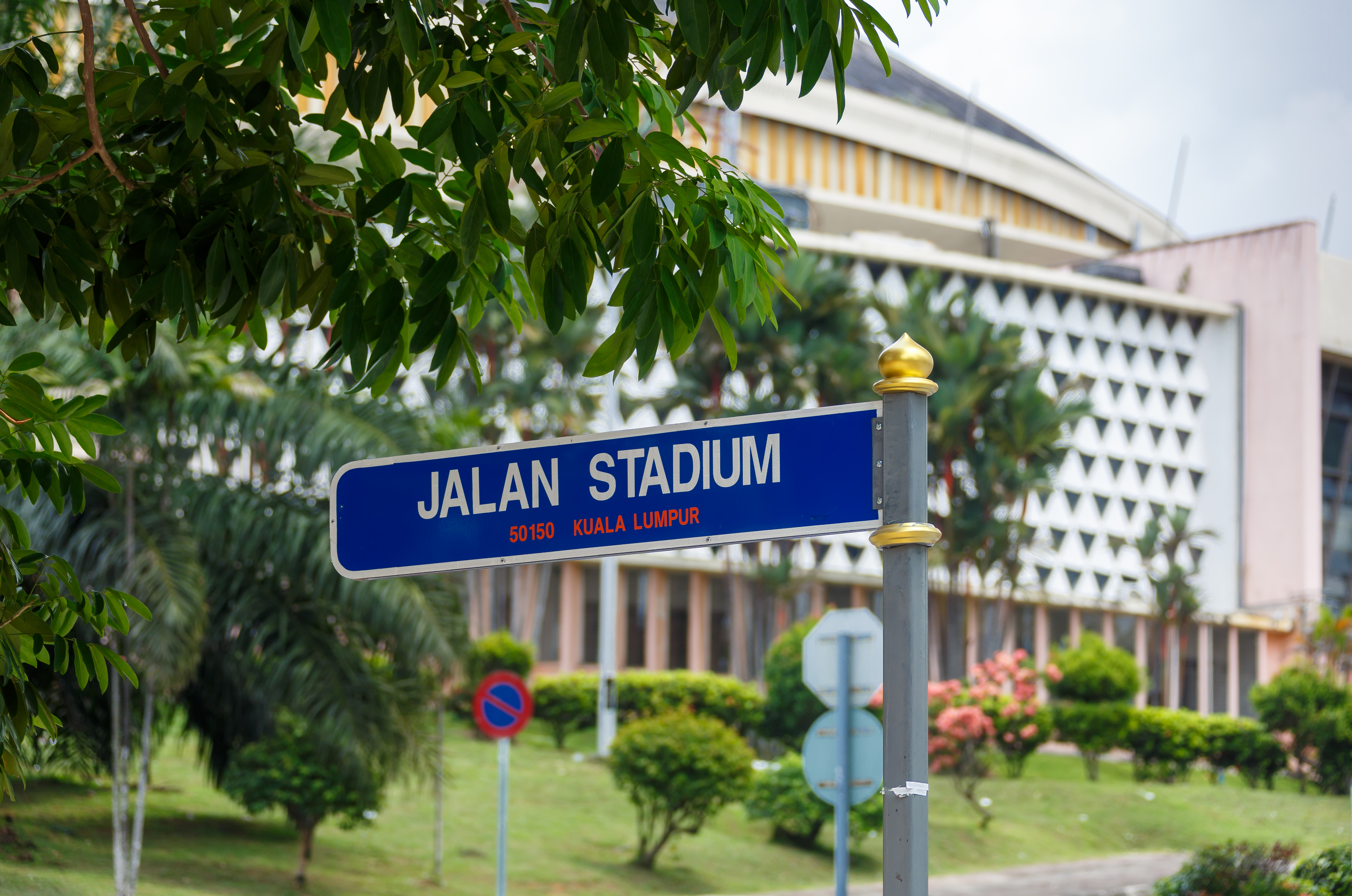
Street sign showing Jalan Stadium with the National Stadium (Stadium Negara) in the background.

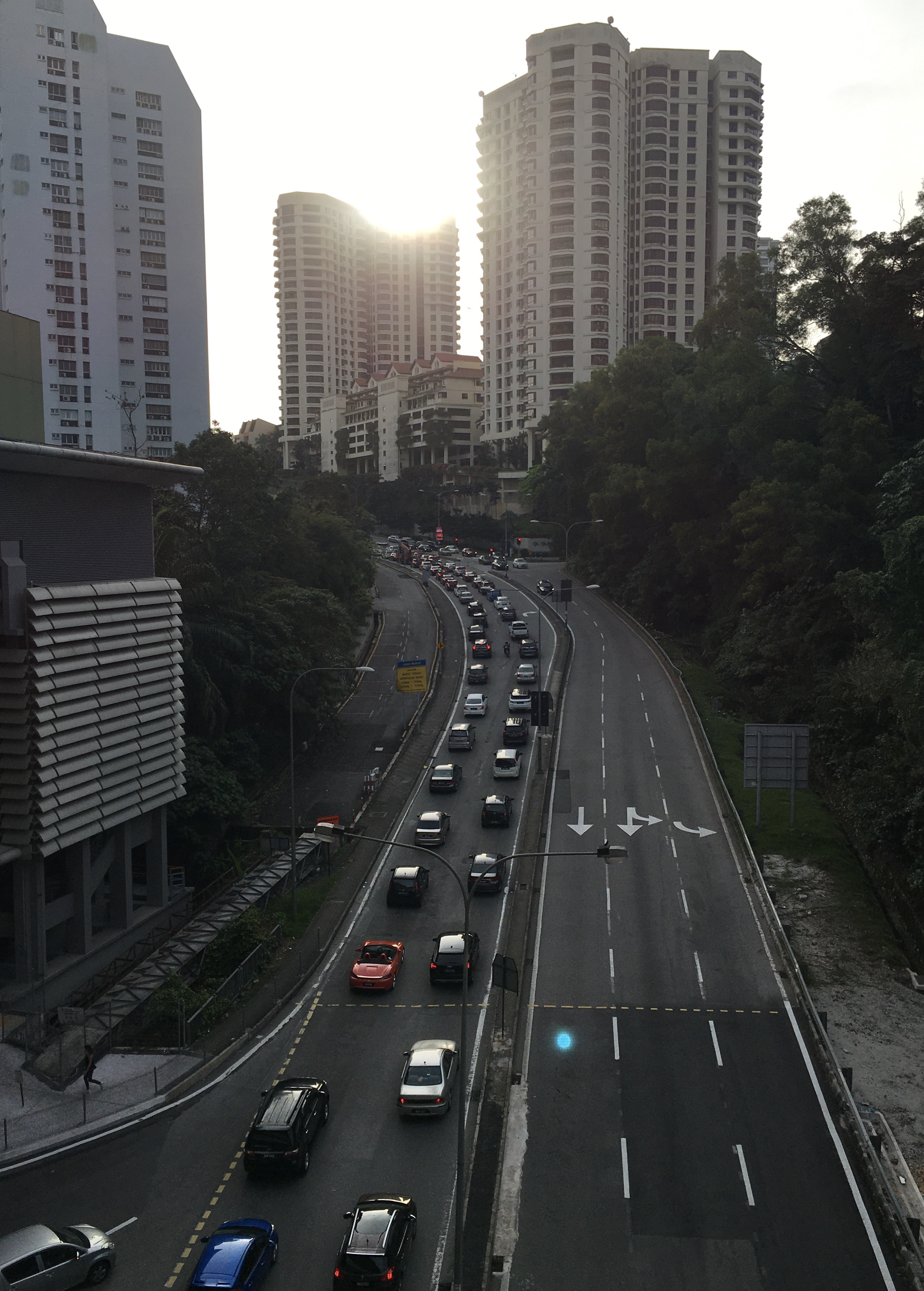
Jalan Maarof looking east towards Bangsar Baru from the Damansara Link.

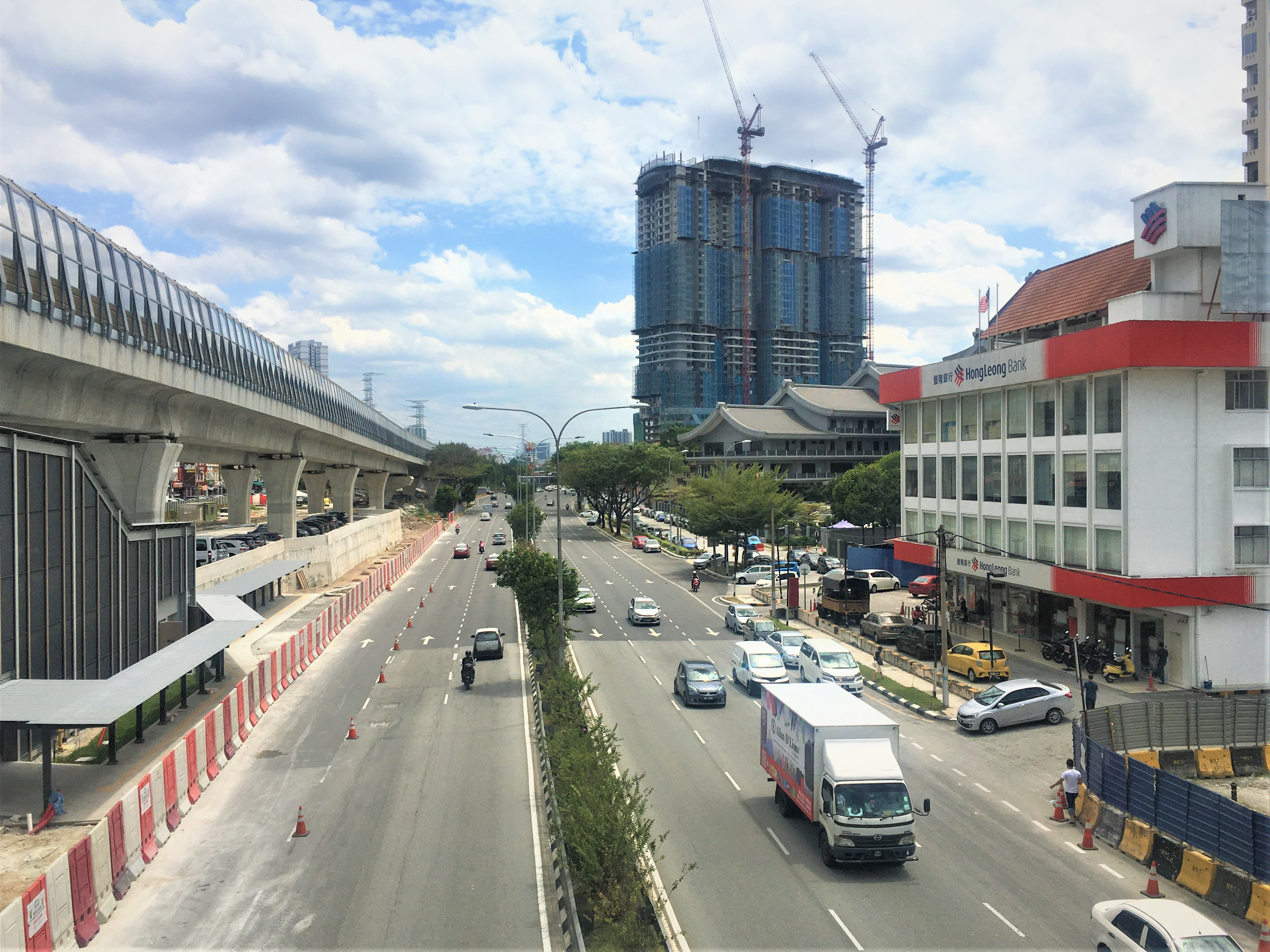
Jalan Kepong, looking east-ward towards Bulatan Kepong with the elevated tracks of the MRT Putrajaya Line on the left.

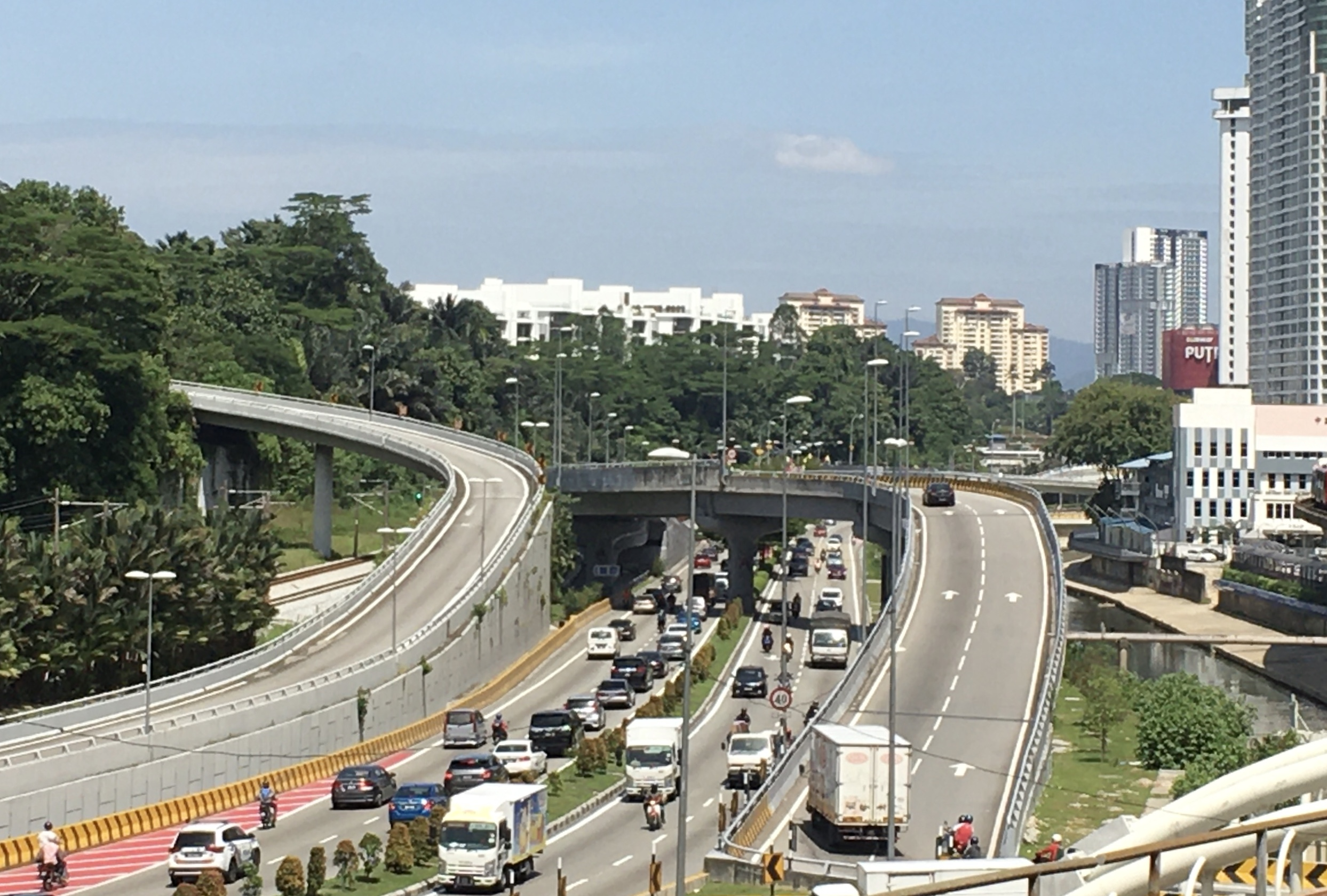
Jalan Kuching road leading towards the Sentul and Segambut districts.

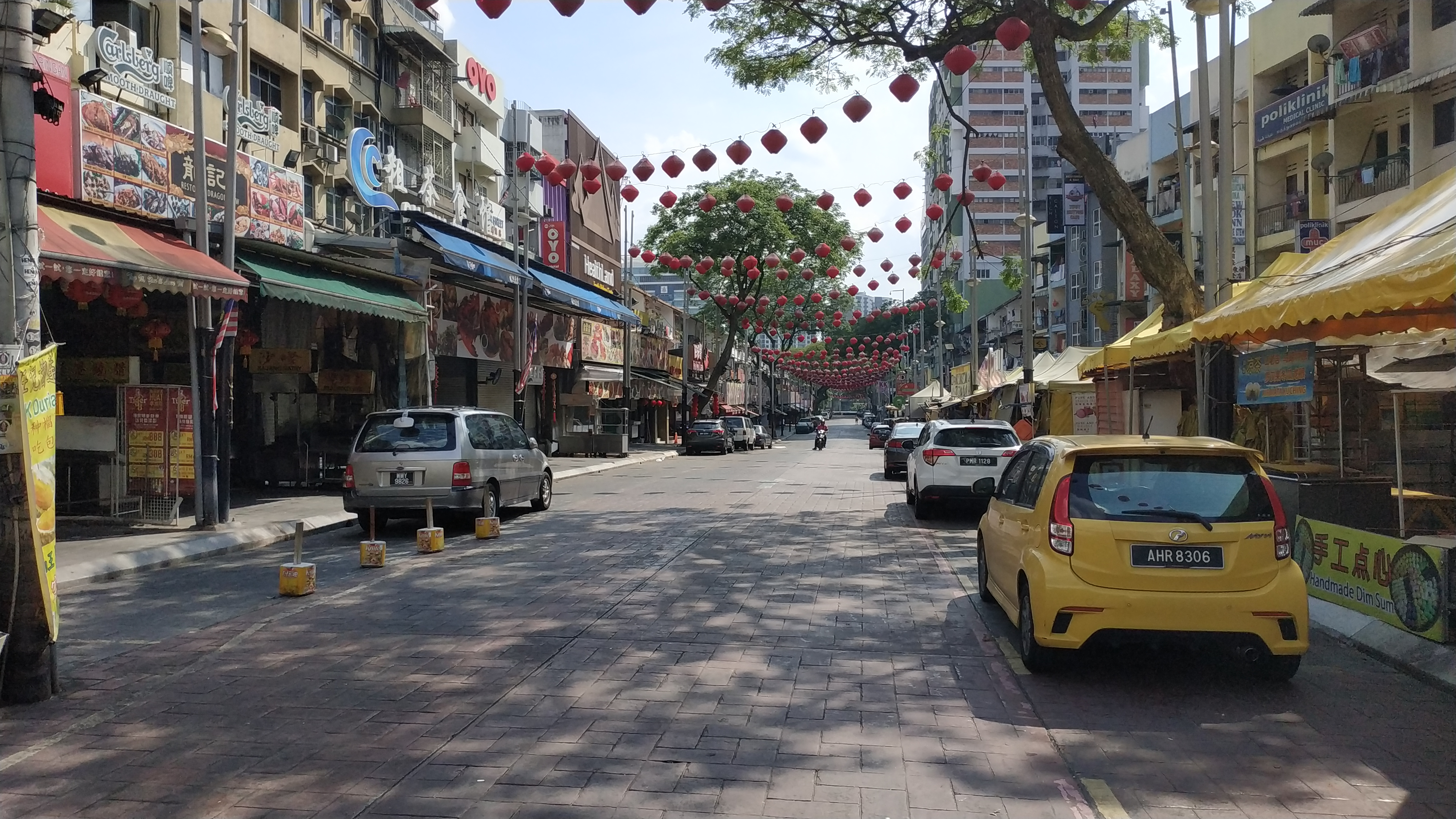
Jalan Alor during daytime.

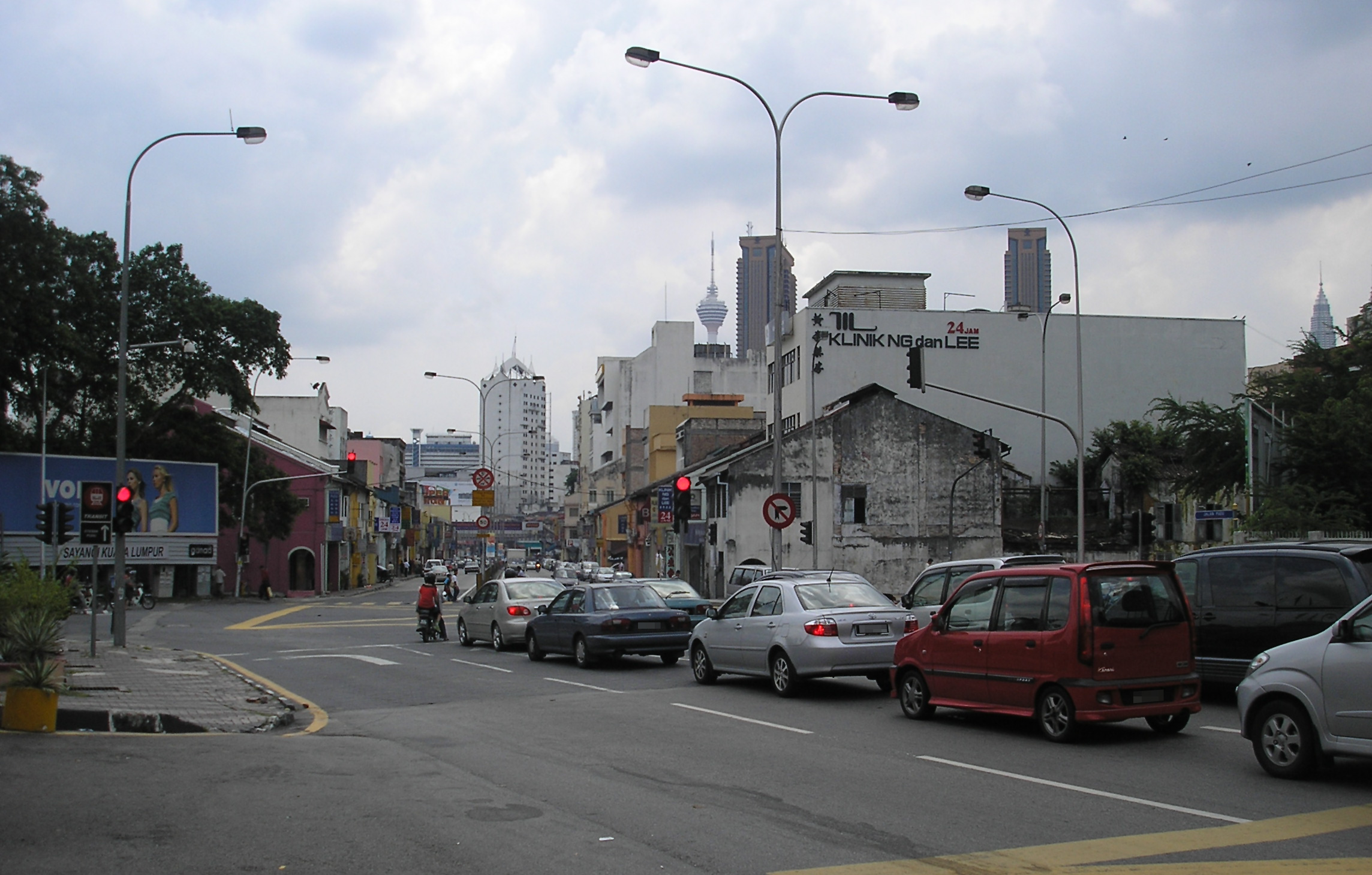
Jalan Pudu at the intersection with Jalan Pasar (Market Road) and Jalan Sungai Besi (Sungai Besi Road)

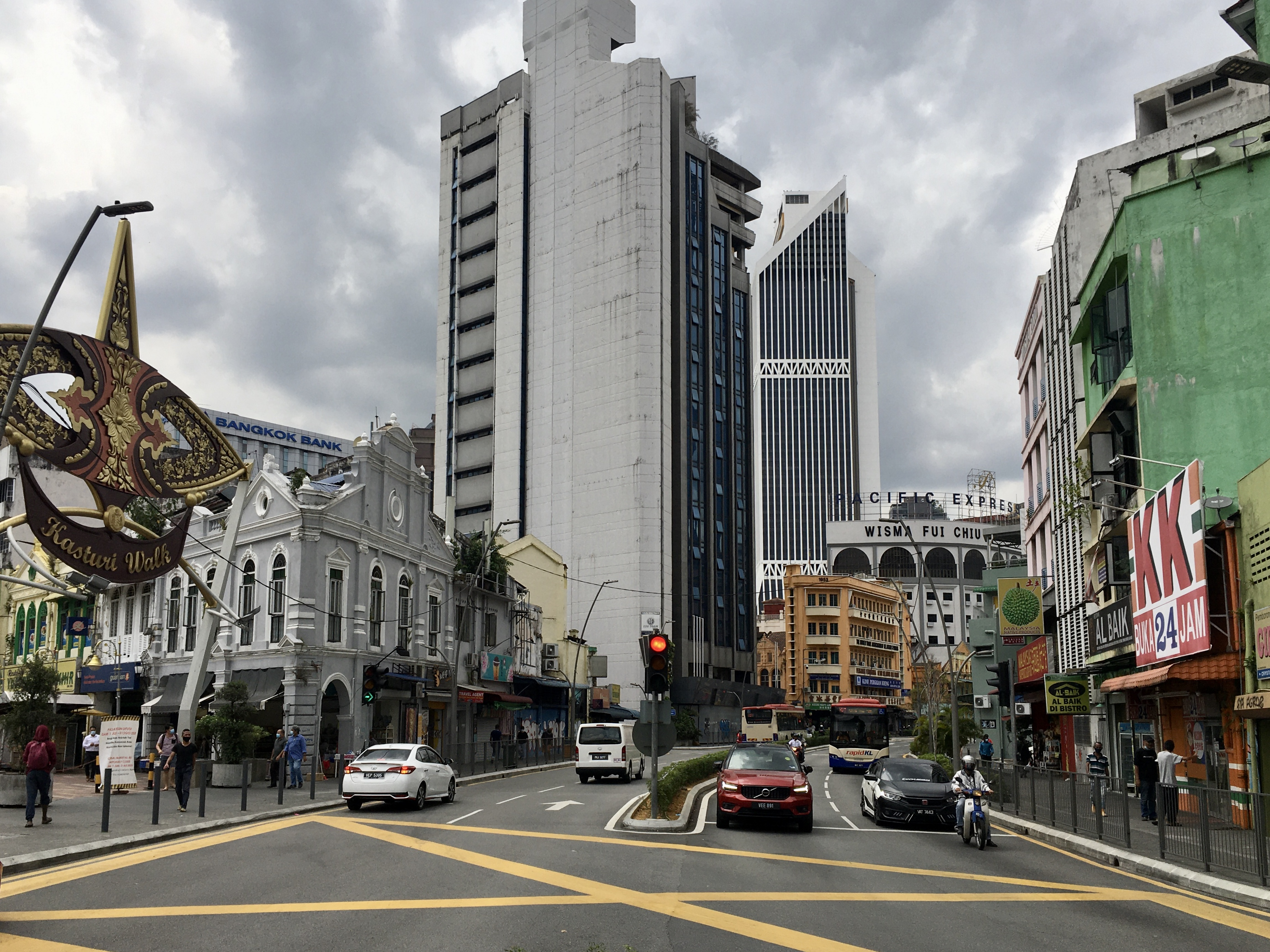
Jalan Tun Tan Cheng Lock (Foch Avenue)

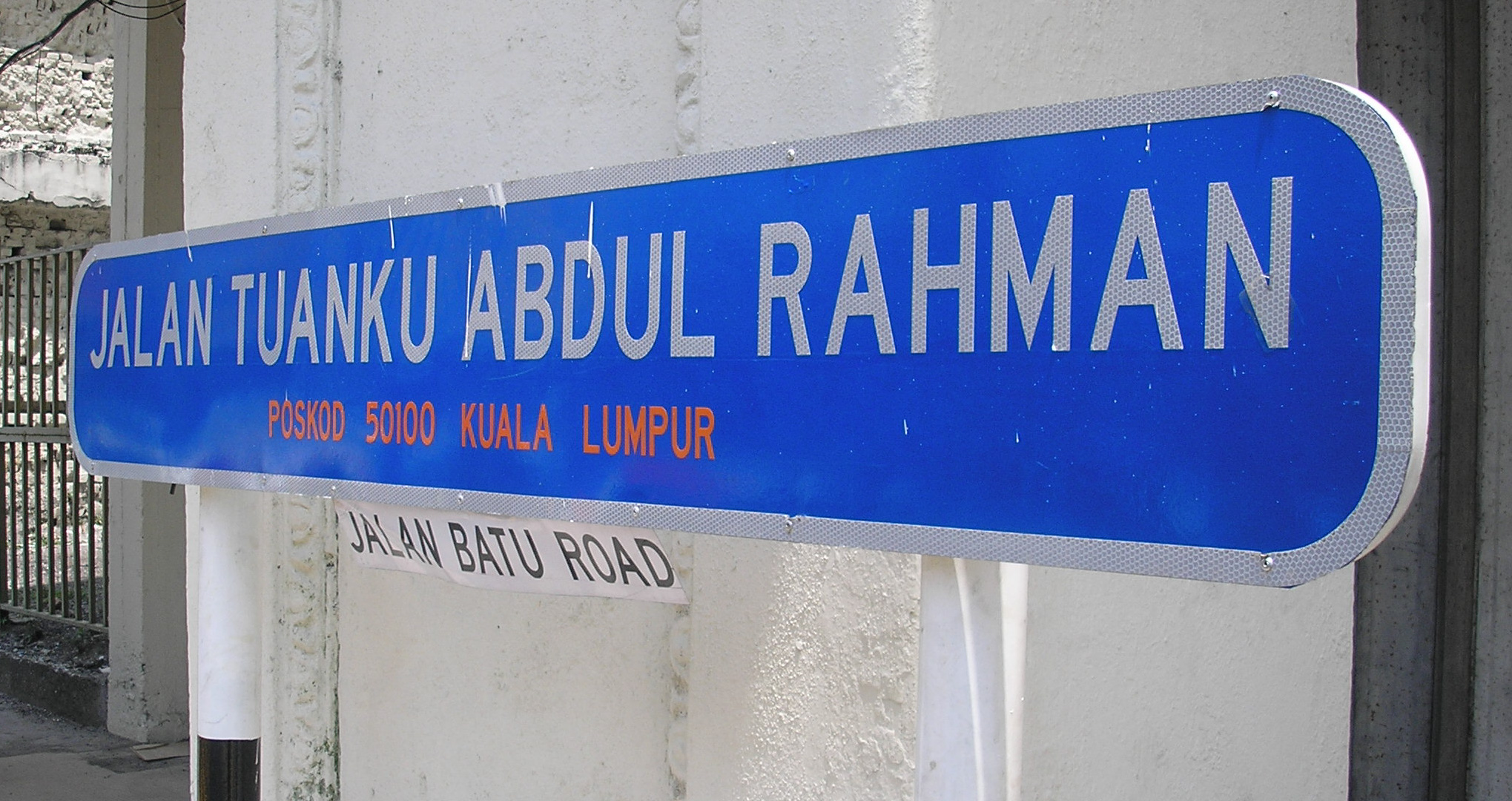
An old street sign showing Jalan Tuanku Abdul Rahman with its old name, Batu Road.

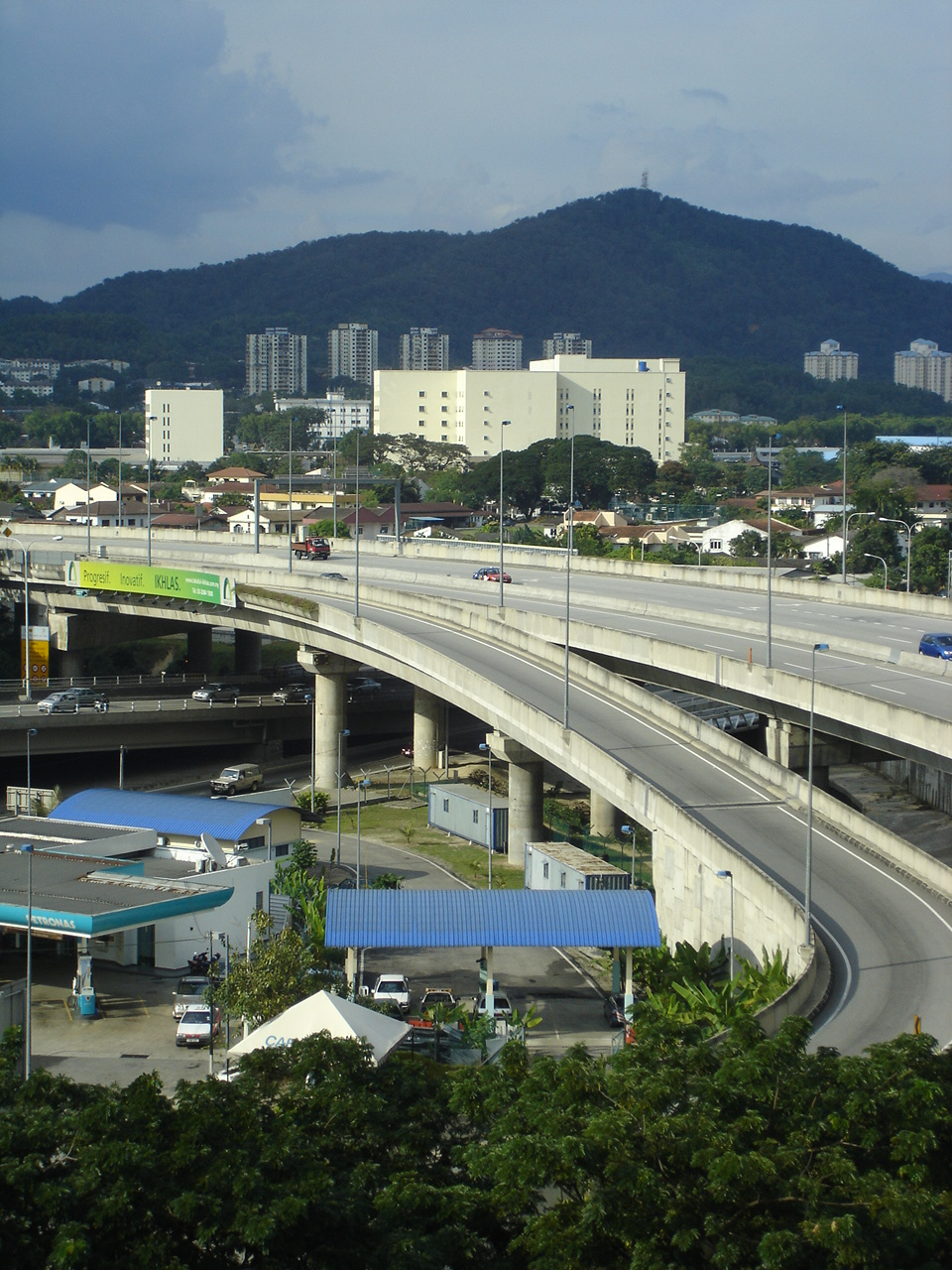
The Ampang–Kuala Lumpur Elevated Highway in Ampang

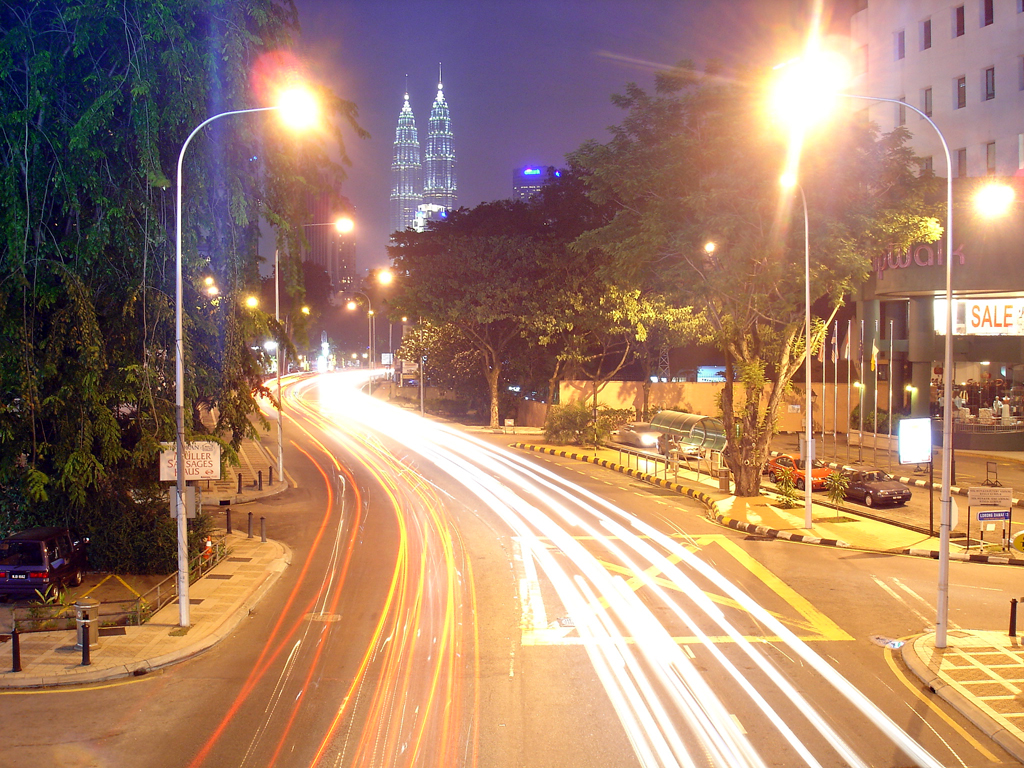
Ampang Road at night

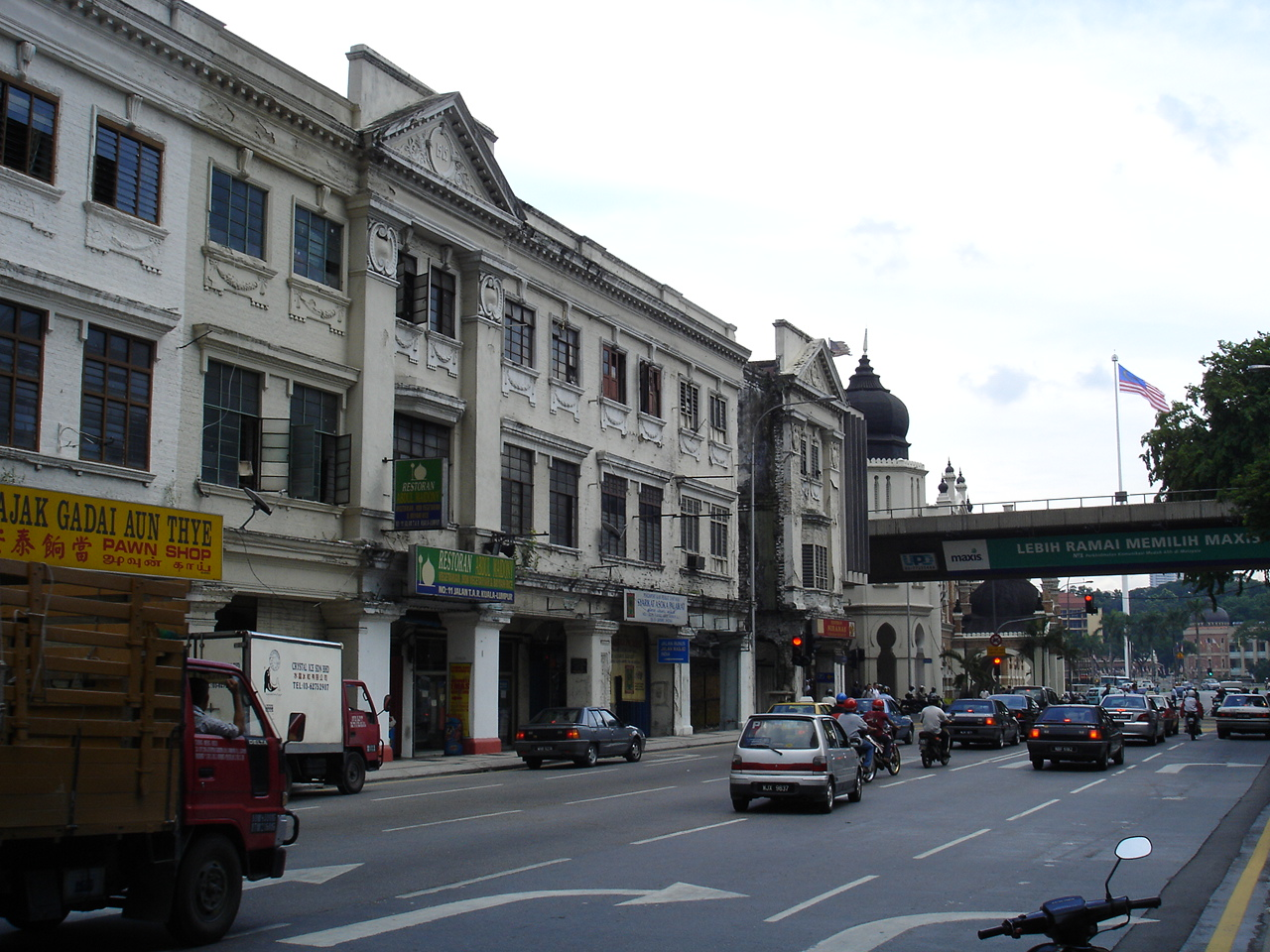
Tuanku Abdul Rahman Road, facing towards Merdeka Square.

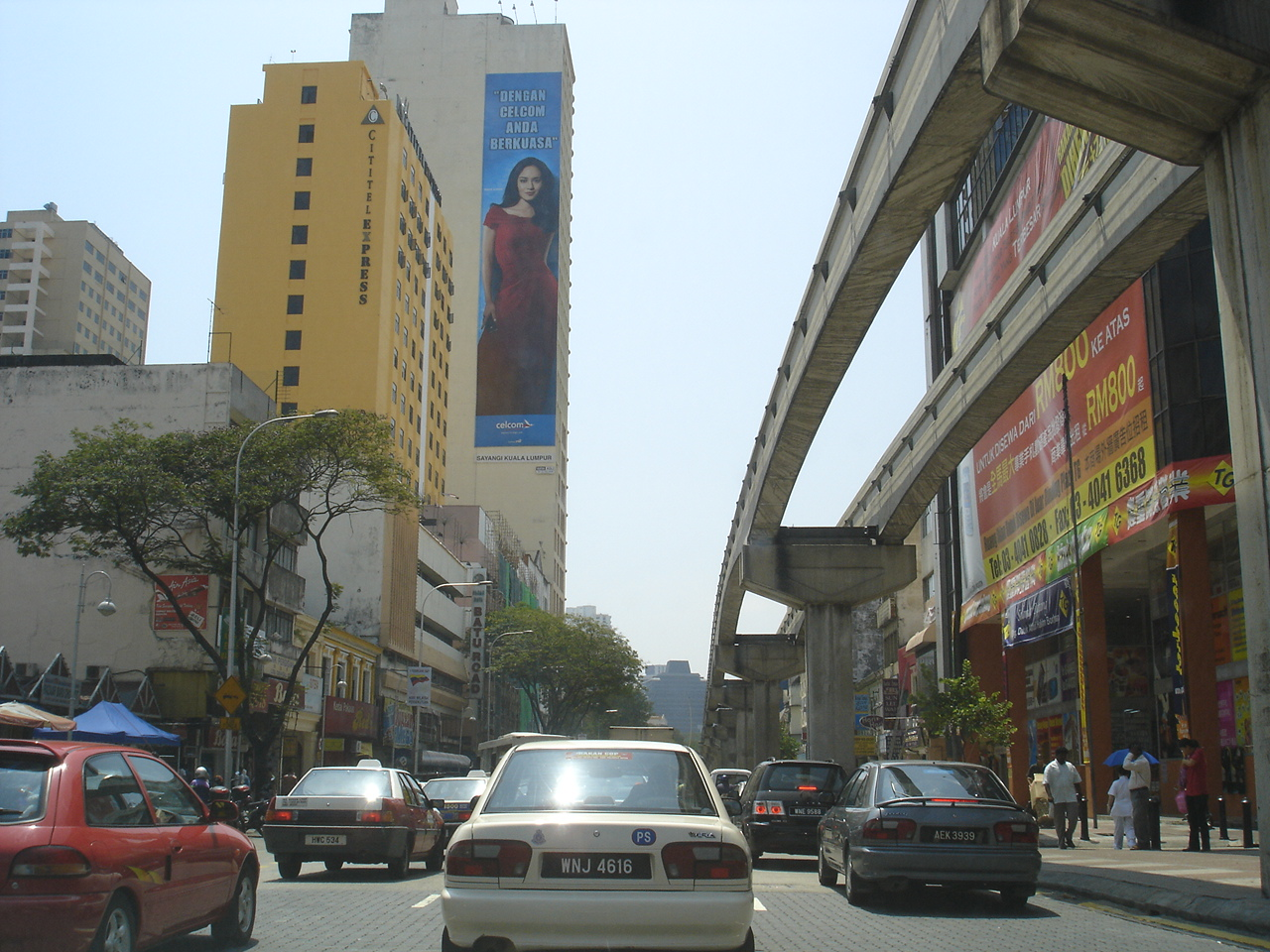
The bazaar strip along Tuanku Abdul Rahman Road in Kuala Lumpur.

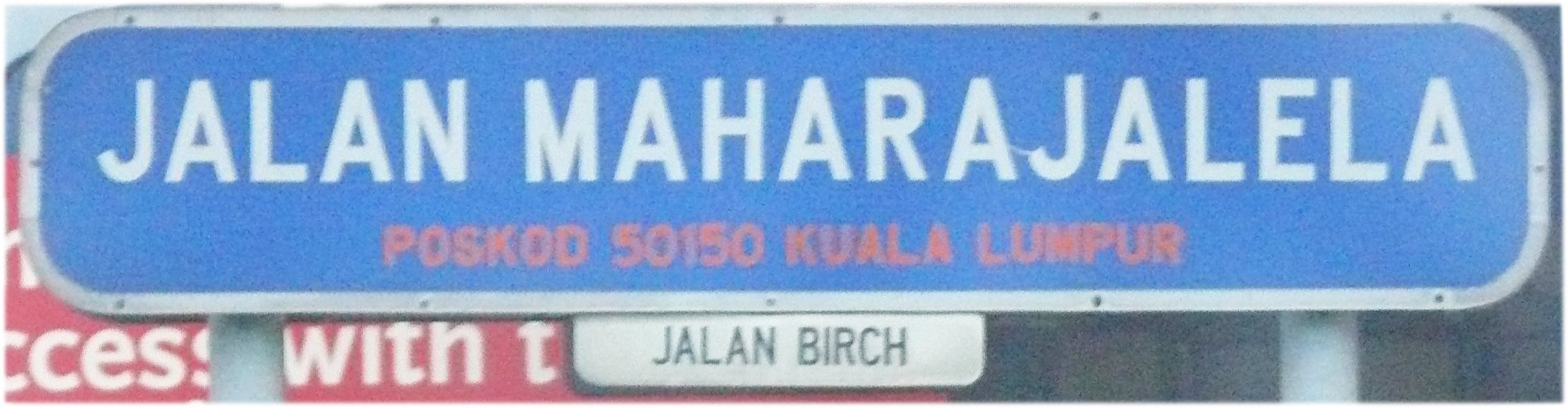
Street sign showing Maharajalela Road with its old name Birch Road.

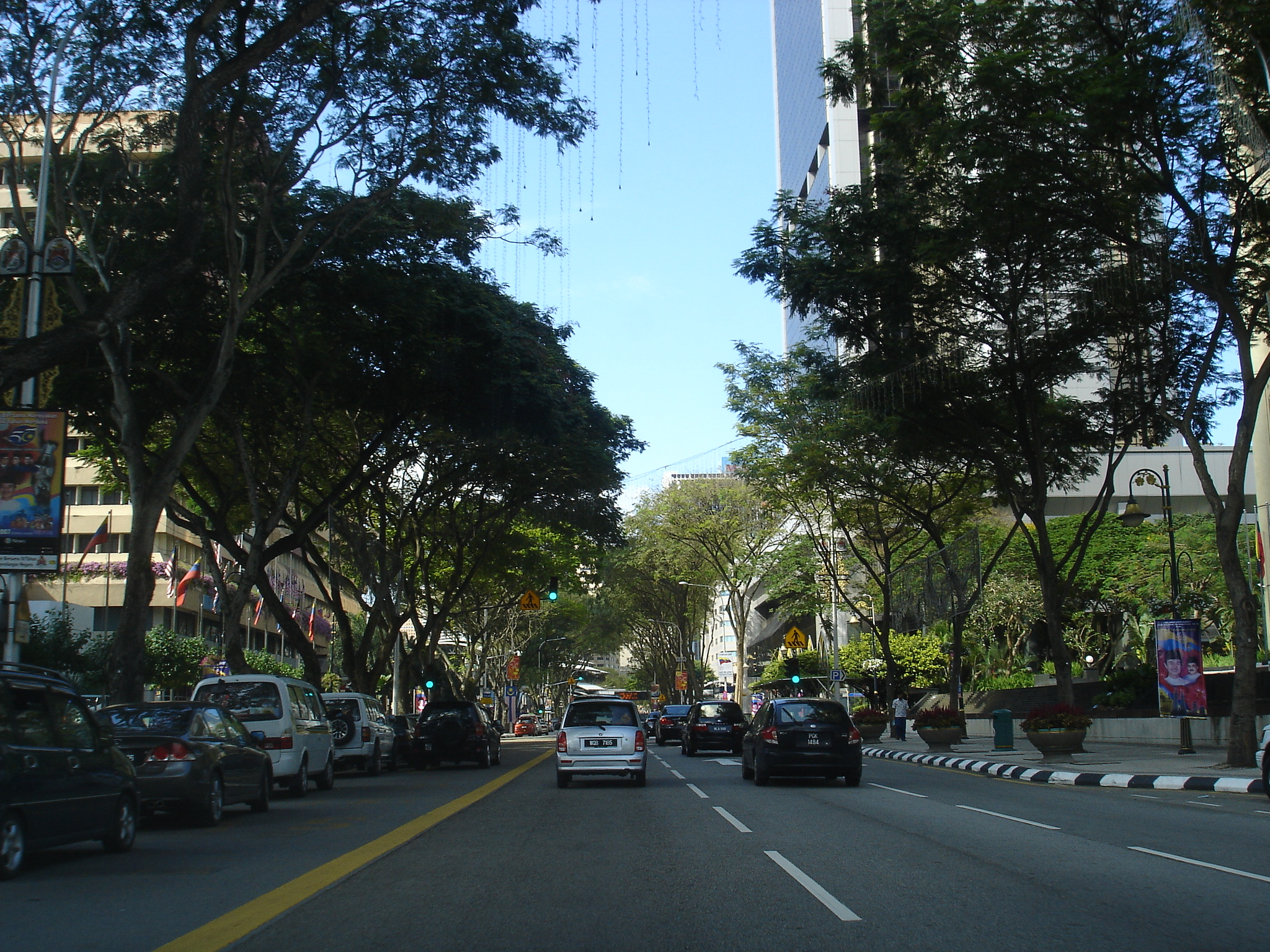
Raja Laut Avenue.

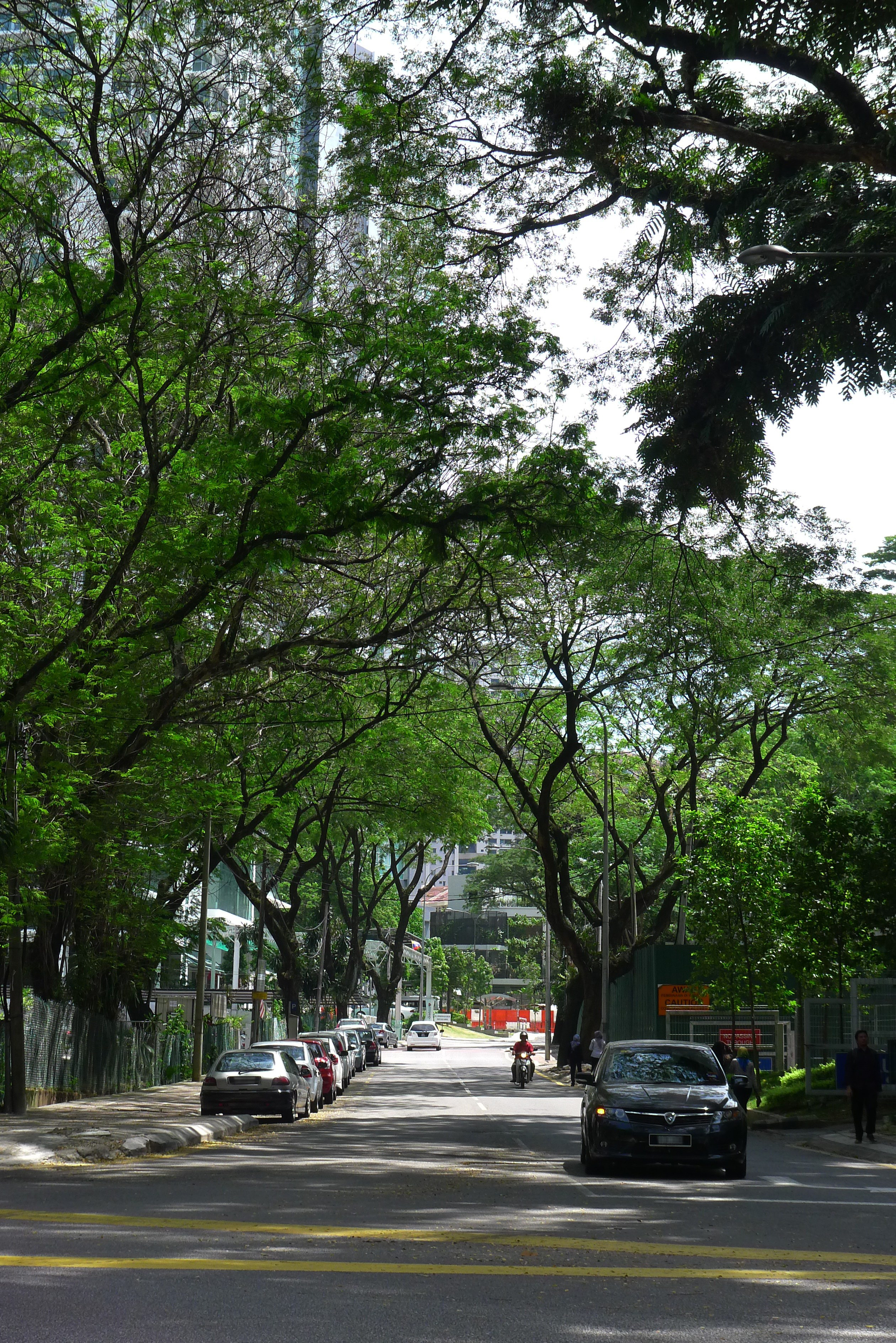
Persiaran Raja Chulan.

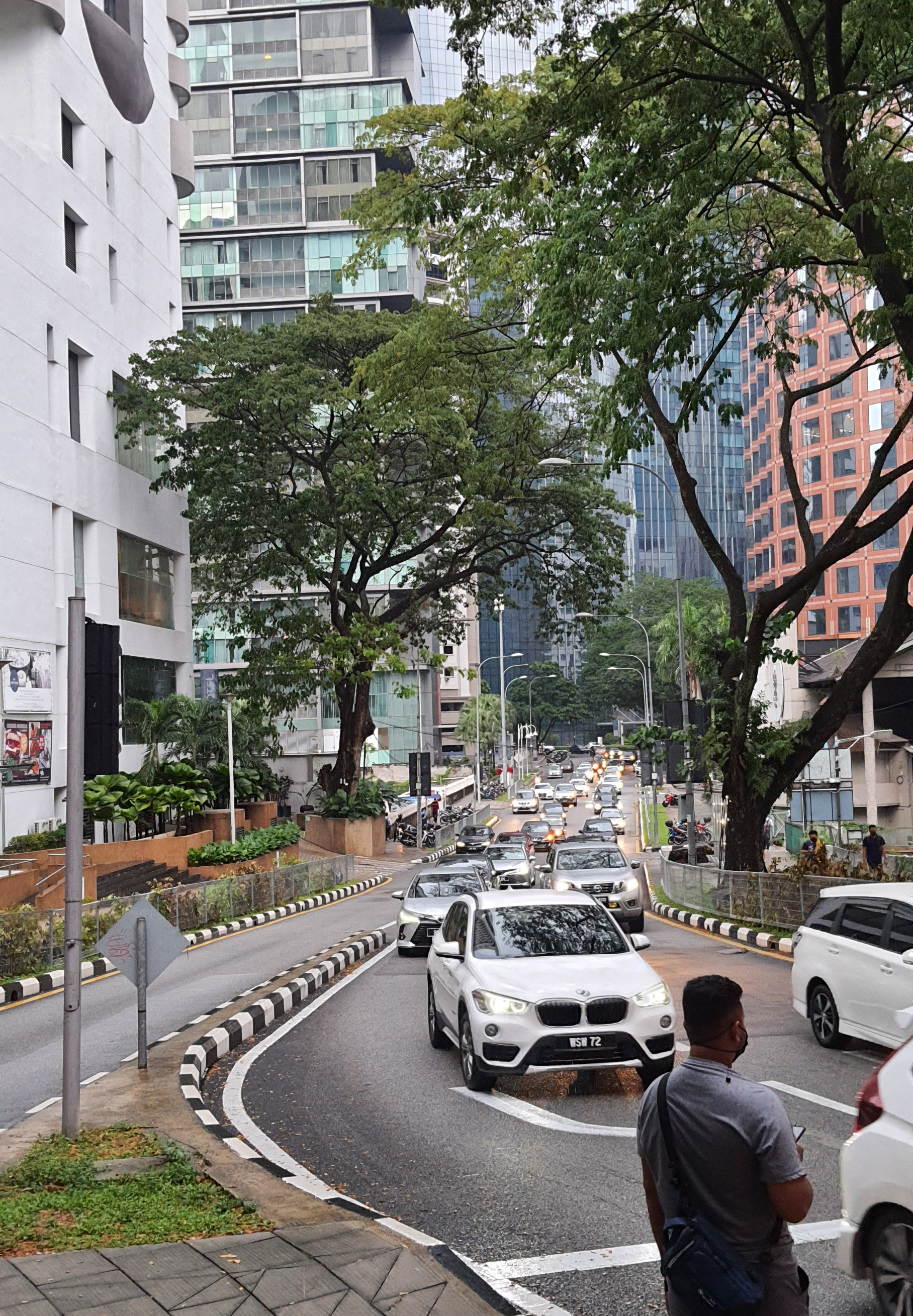
Jalan Kia Peng during an evening rush hour.

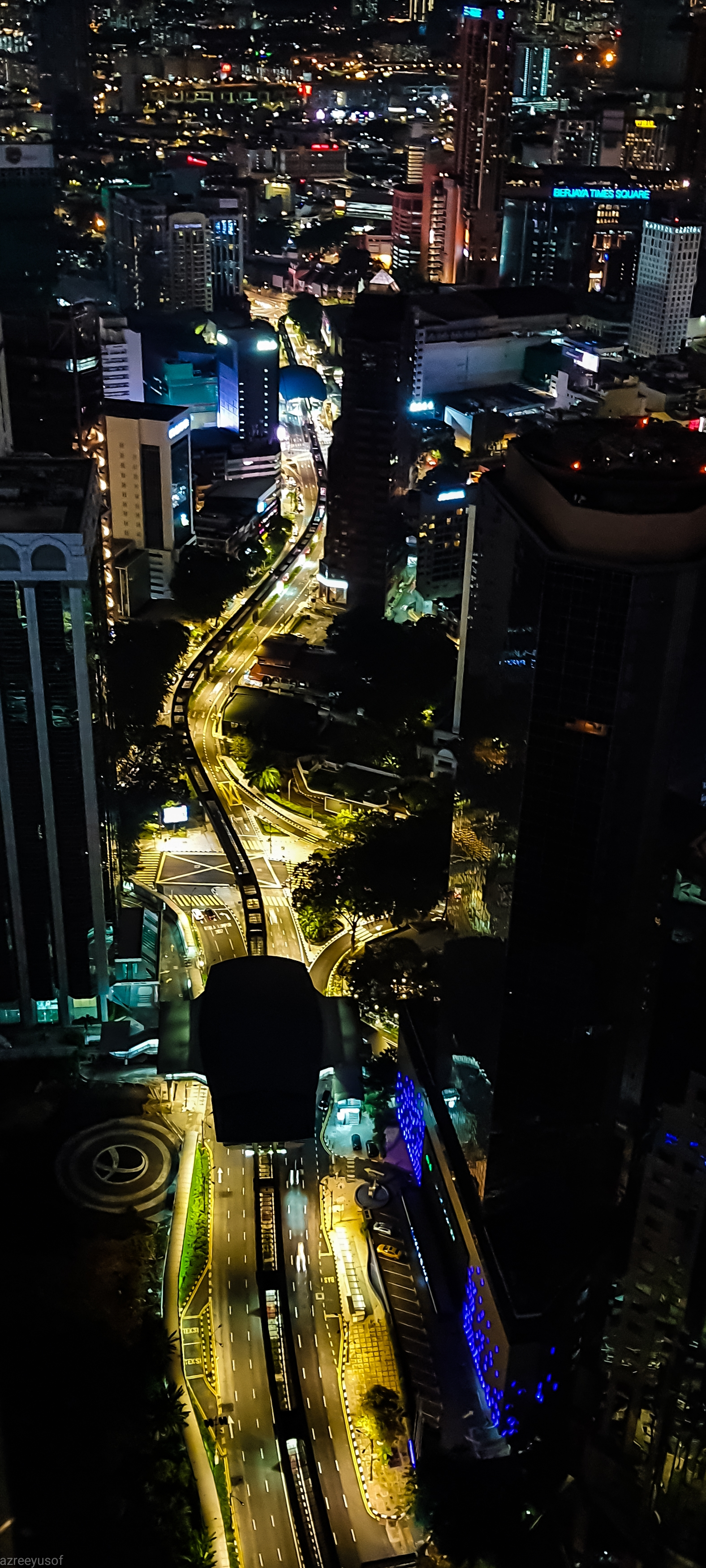
An aerial view of Jalan Sultan Ismail, a major road in Kuala Lumpur, at night with the KL Monorail line meandering above it.

Like all other historical urban centres, the capital city of Malaysia, Kuala Lumpur, contains a number of current and old roads and streets across the city.

This article contains an alphabetical list of notable roads within Kuala Lumpur.

== Overview ==
The majority of older roads in and around Kuala Lumpur were originally named during British rule in Selangor, and as such, were in English and named after British figures, a handful of local dignitaries or royalties, districts, local populations, landmarks or geographical features. Other surrounding locales, such as Kampung Baru, Pudu, Imbi and Sentul have had roads known primarily in Malay since colonial rule.

Following Malaya's independence in 1957 and the formation of Malaysia in 1963, street names in Kuala Lumpur were translated into the Malay language, some of which were given more simplified descriptions (i.e. "Old Market Square" as "Medan Pasar Besar" and "Foch Avenue" as "Jalan Foch"), as Malay was officially adopted as the official language of Malaysia in 1967.

The vast majority of the street names was further renamed en masse in 1981, as part of post-independence decolonisation pushed by the then newly elected Prime Minister of Malaysia Mahathir Mohamad. Street names which previously featured semblances of English origins were replaced by those commemorating local Malay figures, Malay culture and key politicians in Malaya/Malaysia. The renaming included roads in the core of old Kuala Lumpur, as well as major thoroughfares in the city. Further renaming of old street names persists to date, with the rounds of revision conducted by the Kuala Lumpur City Hall as late as 2007 on streets in Pudu and in the fringe towns of Sungai Besi and Jinjang, where English and British-named street names were still in use. Minor roads, however, are typically spared from this form of renaming.

The accelerated development of the city after the country's independence also contributed to the widening of existing artery routes, creation of highways and new roadways, and extensive grade separation of roadways. This resulted in significant alterations of roadways in the city, with several roads merged, split, or modified, forming new roads or retiring old ones.

Old Name	New Name
01. Jalan Alexander	Jalan Hulubalang
02. Jalan Bagot	Jalan Johor
03. Jalan Birch	Jalan Maharajalela
04. Jalan Bluff	Jalan Bukit Aman
05. Jalan Broadrick	Jalan Sultan Ismail & Jalan MARA
06. Jalan Brockman	Jalan Dato Onn
07. Jalan Campbell	Jalen Dang Wangi
08. Jalan Cecil	Jalan Hang Lekir
09. Lorong Cecil	Lorong Hang Lekir
10. Jalan Clarke	Jalan Belanda Satu
11. Jalan Clifford	Jalan Taming Sari
12. Jalan Davidson	Jalan Hang Jebat
13. Lorong Davidson	Lorong Hang Jebat
14. Jalan Douglas	Jalan Pahang
15. Jalan Drury	Jalan Sang Guna
16. Jalan Foch	Jalan Cheng Lock
17. Jalan Freeman	Jalan U Thant
18. Lorong Freeman Satu	Lorong U Thant Satu
19. Lorong Freeman Dua	Lorong U Thant Dua
20. Jalan Taman Freeman	Jalan Taman U Thant
21. Taman Freeman Dua	Taman U Thant Dua
22. Taman Freeman Tiga	Taman U Thant Tiga
23. Taman Freeman Empat	Taman U Thant Empat
24. Jalan Gray	Jalan Semenanjung, Jalan Sabah & Jalan Kinabalu
25. Jalan Guillemard	Jalan Ledang
26. Jalan Lembah Guillemard	Jalan Lembah Ledang
27. Bukit Guillemard	Bukit Ledang
28. Pesiaran Guillemard	Pesiaran Ledang
29. Jalan Gurney	Jalan Semarak
30. Jalan Hale	Jalan Raja Abdullah
31. Jalan Hannigan	Jalan Selangor
32. Jalan Hicks	Changkat Bukit Bintang & Changkat Raja Chulan
33. Lorong Hicks	Lorong Raja Chulan
34. Jalan Hose	Split into Jalan Wisma Putra and Jalan Hose.
35. Jalan Hussey	Jalan Perak
36. Jalan John Hands	Jalan Abdul Manan Nordin
37. Jalan Kenny	Jalan Tunku
38. Jalan Kenny Timor	Langgak Tunku
39. Jalan Kenny Tepi	Tepian Tunku
40. Jalan Kenny Genting	Simpangan Tunku
41. Jalan Kenny Selekoh	Selekoh Tunku
42. Jalan Kenny Utara	Dataran Tunku
43. Jalan Kenny Rendah	Lurah Tunku
44. Jalan Kenny Tinggi	Tinggian Tunku
45. Jalan Kenny Selatan	Taman Tunku
46. Jalan Kenny Kiri	Laman Tunku
47. Jalan Kenny Pertama	Jalan Lembah Tunku
48. Jalan Kenny Kanan	Cerunan Tunku
49. Jalan Kenny Dalam	Dalaman Tunku
50. Jalan Kenny Sentosa	Changkat Tunku
51. Changkat Kenny	Changkat Tunku
52. Pesiaran Bukit Kenny	Pesiaran Bukit Tunku
53. Lorong Kenny Bahagia	Liku Tunku
54. Kenny Hill	Bukit Tunku
55. Jalan Kenny Tengah	Pinggiran Tunku
56. Jalan Klyne	Jalan Hang Lekiu
57. Lorong Klyne	Lorong Hang Lekiu
58. Jalan Langworthy	Jalan Melaka
59. Jalan Lornie	Jalan Syed Putra
60. Lorong Lornie Kiri	Lorong Syed Putra Kiri
61. Bulatan Lornie	Bulatan Syed Putra
62. Pesiaran Lornie	Pesiaran Syed Putra
63. Jalan Macnamara	Jalan Terengganu
64. Jalan Marsh	Jalan Tun Sambanthan 4
65. Jalan Maxwell	Jalan Tun Ismail
66. Lorong Maxwell	Lorong Tun Ismail
67. Maxwell Drive	Pesiaran Tun Ismail
68. Jalan McArthur	Jalan Hang Nadim
69. Jalan Mountbatten	Jalan Tun Perak
70. O'Connell Park	Jalan Sarawak
71. Jalan Parry	Jalan P. Ramlee
72. Jalan Pekeliling	Jalan Tun Razak
73. Jalan Perkins	Jalan Raja Alang
74. Queen's Terrace	Lorong Beliong
75. Jalan Rodger	Jalan Hang Kasturi
76. Jalan Seavoy	Jalan Titiwangsa
77. Jalan Shaw	Jalan Hang Tuah
78. Jalan Spooner	Jalan Cenderawasih
79. Jalan Stoney	Jalan Dewan Sultan Sulaiman
80. Jalan Swettenham	Jalan Mahameru & Jalan Sultan Salahuddin
81. Persiaran Swettenham	Persiaran Mahameru
82. Jalan Travers	Split into Jalan Rakyat and Jalan Travers.
83. Jalan Treacher	Jalan Sultan Ismail
84. Jalan Venning	Jalan Perdana, Jalan Ria & Jalan Tembusu
85. Jalan Watkins	Jalan Bentara
86. Jalan Watson	Jalan Haji Yahya Sheikh Ahmad
87. Jalan Weld	Jalan Raja Chulan
88. Pesiaran Weld	Jalan Cenderasari
89. Jalan Wynne	Jalan Kelantan
90. Jalan Young	Jalan Cenderasari

=== Criticism ===
While earlier street name changes post-independence have been generally accepted, the persistent renaming campaign of existing roads and growing public awareness of the history of Kuala Lumpur's streets has increasingly drawn ire from local communities, particularly road users, postal users, and historians, due to inconvenience borne from memorising longer, more convoluted names of roads which were formerly shorter and easier to memorise, the increased cost of replacing and maintaining documents and signages, and the revisionist undertones of the renaming policy. One renaming campaign of eight major roads in honour of former Yang di-Pertuan Agongs on 2 November 2014 had notably drawn backlash from the public as well as Member of Parliament Lim Lip Eng, leading to a rebuttal by UMNO Youth chief Khairy Jamaluddin; the name change proceeded in spite of the controversy.

== Standard translations ==
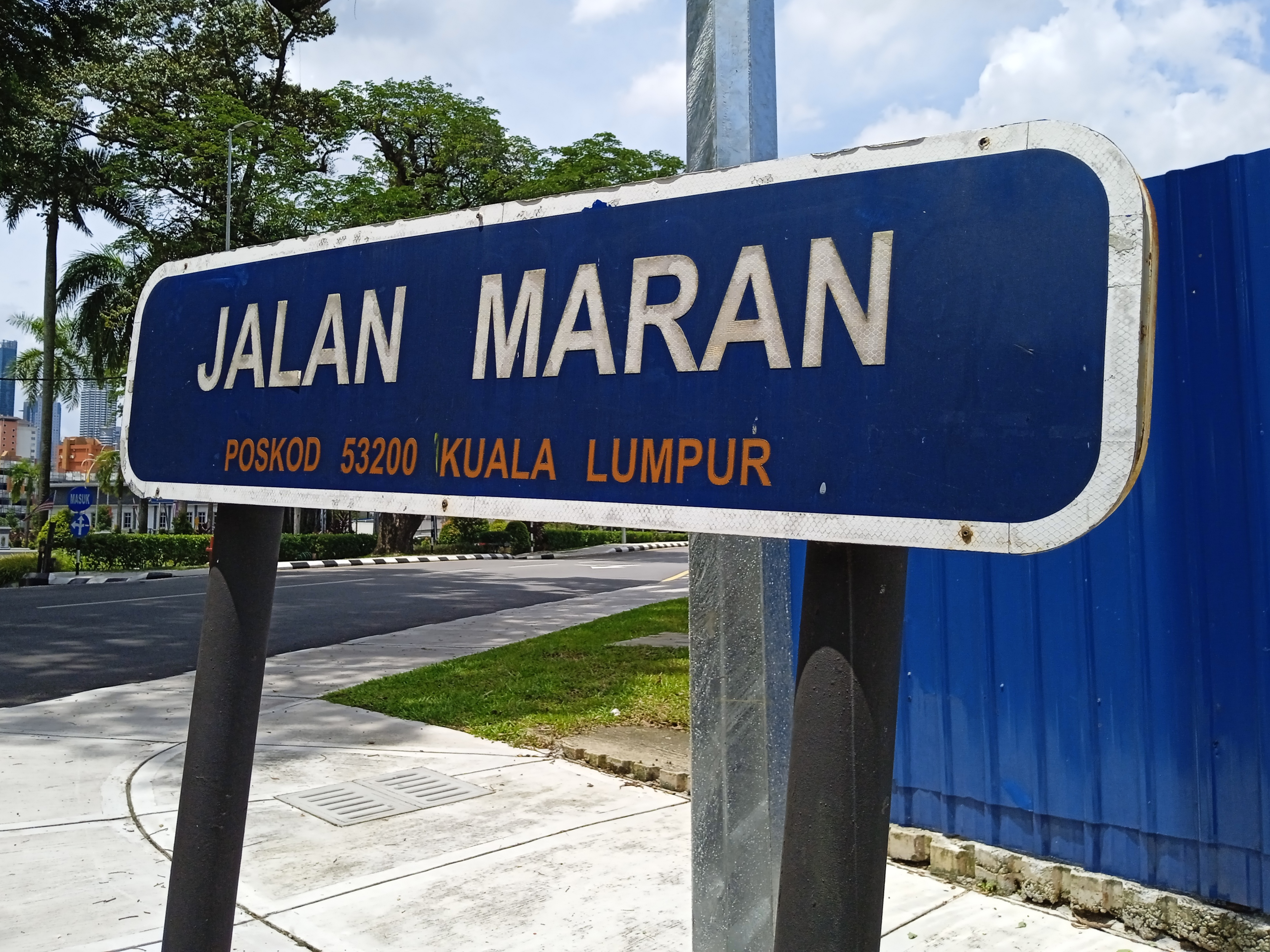
Street name sign at Kuala Lumpur.

A guideline was formulated for the translation of English signage on roads. The Kuala Lumpur City Hall is pursuing a process of standardisation for road signage. (e.g. Tengkat Tong Shin has been renamed as Jalan Tong Shin)

- Avenue/Highway - Lebuhraya (e.g. Mahameru Highway/Lebuhraya Mahameru)
- Circular - Pekeliling
- Circus - Bulatan
- Close - Pinggir/Pinggiran/Solok (e.g. Ridley Close/Pinggir Ridley)
- Crescent - Lengkok (e.g. Bellamy Crescent/Lengkok Bellamy)
- Drive – Persiaran (e.g. Hampshire Drive/Persiaran Hampshire)
- Gardens – Taman (e.g. Maxwell Garden/Taman Maxwell; Happy Garden/Taman Gembira)
- Grove - Gerbang (e.g. Lower Ampang Grove/Gerbang Ampang Hilir)
- Hill - Langgak (e.g. Tunku Hill/Langgak Tunku)
- Lane – Lorong (e.g. Horse Lane/Lorong Kuda)
- Lower - Hilir
- Mount - Puncak
- Place - Laman (e.g. Seputeh Place/Laman Seputeh)
- Rise - Changkat/Cangkat (e.g. Bukit Bintang Rise/Changkat Bukit Bintang)
- Road – Jalan (e.g. Perak Road/Jalan Perak)
- Ring Road - Lingkaran (e.g. Lingkaran Syed Putra)
- Square – Medan (e.g. Old Market Square/Medan Pasar Lama)
- Street – Lebuh (e.g. Menjalara Street/Lebuh Menjalara)
- Terrace - Tingkat
- Upper - Ulu/Hulu
- Walk - Pintas

== Major roads ==
English name	Malay name, official	Chinese name	Image	Note
Ampang Road	Jalan Ampang	安邦路		Named after the district of Ampang, several shopping malls such as the Ampang Park, City Square and Suria KLCC are located along the road.
Bungsar Road Later, Bangsar Road	Jalan Bangsar	孟沙路		Formerly named Jalan Bangsa during the time when Abdullah Hukum, the founder of Kampung Haji Abdullah Hukum at Bangsar opened a trail between a forest and the nearby Bukit Angkasapuri. The road name means that it was built jointly by the Malays, Chinese and Indians, the three main races of Malaysia. The long stretch is now named after the suburb of Bangsar.
Bukit Bintang Road	Jalan Bukit Bintang	武吉免登路 （pinyin: wǔ jí miǎn dēng lù）		The road runs through most of Bukit Bintang, the entertainment district of Kuala Lumpur.
Cheras Road	Jalan Cheras	蕉赖路		Named after the district of Cheras. It is a long stretch that runs through the Cheras district and most of its residential areas, and ends at the border of Selangor which connects with the Cheras–Kajang Expressway.
Chow Kit Road	Jalan Chow Kit	秋杰路		Named after the revenue farmer, tin miner, shipping agent, municipal councillor and public official, Loke Chow Kit, who was the first local owner of a department store – Chow Kit & Co. – the largest in KL at that time. Chow Kit is also a sub-district in central Kuala Lumpur and features Chow Kit station, Bazaar Baru Chow Kit (a wet market) and Pasar Malam Chow Kit (a night market).
Cochrane Road	Jalan Cochrane	葛京路		Named after the British General Advisor of Johor, Charles Walter Hamilton Cochrane, 17th British Resident of Perak (1929–1930), Chief Secretary to the Government.
Damansara Road	Jalan Damansara	白沙罗路		Named after the suburb of Bukit Damansara. The road leads to Damansara Heights connecting with Jalan Jelutong and is also a highway as well.
Campbell Road	Jalan Dang Wangi	金马律		Formerly named after Douglas Campbell (1867–1918), resident of Negri Sembilan, Johor's first British advisor. The road name changed after wife of Hang Jebat. Notable as the location of the Campbell Shopping Complex fire in 1976.
Old Airport Road	Jalan Dewan Bahasa	旧机场路		Erected in 1997. Near the road is the Dewan Bahasa dan Pustaka main headquarters, a landmark and the symbol of Bahasa Melayu, the national language of Malaysia. It was given the name "Old Airport Road" due to its connection to the Sungai Besi Airport, one of the earliest airports to serve Kuala Lumpur. Previously also known as Bellamy Road and Jalan Lapangan Terbang Lama.
Straits Road	Jalan Esfahan	伊斯法罕路		Erected in 1993, the road is currently named after the city of Isfahan, Iran. Originally named after the Straits of Malacca or the Straits Settlements. This is one of the shortest roads in Kuala Lumpur; it is more of a linking alley than a proper road. Jalan Esfahan connects Jalan Tuanku Abdul Rahman with Jalan Raja Laut. Previously, Jalan Selat.
Genting Klang-Pahang Highway	Jalan Genting Klang	云顶吉冷路		Part of the Genting Klang–Pahang Highway
Davidson Road	Jalan Hang Jebat	汉惹拔路（德威伸路）		Currently named after Hang Jebat. Formerly named after James Guthrie Davidson (J.G. Davidson), the first British Resident in Selangor in 1875. The Merdeka 118 tower and its precinct are located along this road.
Rodger Street (羅爷街)	Jalan Hang Kasturi	汉卡斯杜丽路		Formerly named after Sir John Pickersgill Rodger (1851–1910), Chief Magistrate, Selangor (1882); Acting British Resident, Selangor (1884–1888); first British Resident, Pahang (1888–1896); British Resident, Selangor (1896–1901); British Resident, Perak (1901–1904); Governor Gold Coast (1904–1910).
Cecil Street	Jalan Hang Lekir	思士街		Sir Cecil Clementi Smith, (1840–1916), Governor of Straits Settlements from 1887 to 1893. Often confused with his nephew, Sir Cecil Clementi (1875–1947) who was Governor of Hong Kong (1925–30), Governor of the Straits Settlements and High Commissioner for the Malay States (1930 to 1934). Sir Cecil Clementi Smith approved the building of The Anglican Church of St. Mary the Virgin in 1887 and approved the building of the Victoria Institution in 1893.
Klyne Street	Jalan Hang Lekiu	吉粦街/吉灵街/吉寜街		
Shaw Road (1938–1981); Gaol Road (<1938)	Jalan Hang Tuah	汉都亚路		Part of the Kuala Lumpur Inner Ring Road.
Imbi Road	Jalan Imbi	燕美路		Named after the district of Imbi, located in Bukit Bintang. The road runs through Bukit Bintang City Centre (BBCC), Berjaya Time Square, Jalan Sultan Ismail junction, The Ritz-Carlton KL and ends with the Jalan Bukit Bintang junction.
Ipoh Road	Jalan Ipoh	怡保律		A long stretch of road from the Kepong Roundabout to Jalan Tuanku Abdul Halim (Jalan Duta). The road previously stretched from the Jalan Tuanku Abdul Rahman junction to the Kepong Roundabout before the separation with Jalan Sultan Azlan Shah which was formed in 2014. The road obtained its name as the only road towards Ipoh from the city centre back then, and is part of the country's Federal Route 1. Formerly known as Batu Road.
Taylor Road (1960)	Jalan Istana	皇宫路		Named after the Sir W.T. Taylor, Resident General of the Federated Malay States. Currently named after former Istana Negara (the National Palace), which is located near the road. It is connected to the Kuala Lumpur–Seremban Expressway and Jalan Damansara at each end.
Kepong Road	Jalan Kepong	甲洞路		Named after the Kepong district. A long stretch that runs from the Kepong Roundabout to the Kepong–Selayang Highway (part of MRR2). Part of the Federal Route 54.
Old River Road	Jalan Kinabalu	京那峇鲁路		Formerly known as Jalan Raja (north and southeast stretches) (1960). Part of the Kuala Lumpur Inner Ring Road. The Jalan Kinabalu Flyover is located on this road, the first overpass built in Malaysia after independence. The road connects with Jalan Kuching and Jalan Maharajalela at each end.
Klang Road Later, Old Klang Road	Jalan Klang Lama	旧巴生路		This road used to be Kuala Lumpur's main accessway to Klang, hence the name. The road connects with Jalan Syed Putra and the New Pantai Expressway.
	Jalan Kuching	古晋路		Part of the Kuala Lumpur Inner Ring Road and Kuala Lumpur–Rawang Highway.
Loke Yew Road (陆佑律)	Jalan Loke Yew	陆佑路 （pinyin:Lùyòu lu）		The road is part of the Cheras Highway. Named after Loke Yew, the leader of the Chinese community, one of the richest Chinese businessmen in early Kuala Lumpur. He has constructed the Sungai Besi Road.
-	Jalan Maarof	马洛夫路		The road is located within the suburb of Bangsar and is the main thoroughfare of the suburb. The road is named after the Kampung Ma'arof village back then in 1959. It is also possibly named after Ma'arof bin Malim, who was an employee at the Bangsar Electric Power Station and presumably the headman of that village.
Birch Road 美芝律	Jalan Maharajalela	马哈拉惹里拉路		In the mistaken presumption that it was named after the first Resident of Perak, James Wheeler Woodford Birch, this road was renamed after Dato' Maharajalela, a local Malay chief who was partially responsible for Birch's assassination in 1875. In fact it was actually named in honour of the much more popular Sir Ernest Woodford Birch, the eldest son of the former and a one-time acting Resident of Selangor, the Eighth Resident of Perak (1905–1910).
Broadrick Road	Jalan MARA	玛拉路		Named after MARA (Majlis Amanah Rakyat) headquarters along this road and was previously known as Jalan Semarang. Broadrick Road is named after Lt Col Edward George Broadrick (b. 1864 – d. 1929), President of the Singapore Municipality from 1904 to 1910 and British Resident of Selangor from 1911 to 1919. Mentioned in Batu Road Boys' School documents in the 1960s and 1970s which also include the old postcode (02-05).
Dickson Street	Jalan Masjid India	印度清真寺路		Currently named after a local mosque, Masjid India. The southern end of the road was recently converted into a pedestrian street.
Market Street	Lebuh Pasar Besar	马吉街		Named after the Old Market Square (Medan Pasar Besar), crossing the Klang River from Medan Pasar Besar to Dataran Merdeka. Terminates at Jalan Raja Laut in the west and Jalan Tun H.S. Lee in the east.
Old Market Square	Medan Pasar Besar	老巴塞/老北虱		A large public space that consisted of two roads, Macao Street and Hokkien Street (circa 1880s and 1890s), divided by a traffic island. The area was formerly the location of Kuala Lumpur's main market, before the British government completed what would become the Central Market in 1888 and 1889. The Old Market Square became and open area commonly used as a recreation area and commercial center in early Kuala Lumpur, but diminished in importance as the city grew outwards. The area is now used primarily as a bus hub.
Pahang Road	Jalan Pahang	彭亨路		Named after the state of Pahang. Part of the Genting Klang–Pahang Highway
-	Jalan Parlimen	国会路		Previously known as Club Road. The road leads up to the Houses of Parliament building from the Dato' Onn Roundabout.
	Jalan Pantai Baharu	班底峇鲁路		
Petaling Street	Jalan Petaling	茨厂街 （pinyin: Cíchǎng Jiē）		The historical Chinatown of Kuala Lumpur located in the Old City Centre, see Petaling Street.
Penang Street	Jalan Pinang	槟榔街		Named after Pulau Pinang (Penang), a state in Malaysia. The KL Convention Centre of KLCC is located along this road.
Puchong Road	Jalan Puchong	蒲种路		Named after the town of Puchong, it is the main route from Jalan Klang Lama to Puchong Jaya.
Pudoh/Pudu Road (Not to be confused with Pudoh Street)	Jalan Pudu	半山芭路		Currently named after the district of Pudu. The Pudu Prison, the Puduraya bus station and the Plaza Rakyat construction site are located along Jalan Pudu.
Parry Road (巴里律)	Jalan P. Ramlee	比南利路		Erected in 1982 and named after actor P. Ramlee, this street contains many pubs and nightclubs.
Raja Road (west stretch) (1960) Gombak Road (formerly) (circa 1880s and 1890s)	Jalan Raja			Notably passes the historic Sultan Abdul Samad Building, Merdeka Square and other similar structures in the vicinity. As of 1960, the road initially terminated at a T junction with Mountbatten Road and Batu Road in the north and the Jalan Raja-Market Street-Victory Avenue crossroad in the south. The road was subsequently extended north, stretching along the Gombak River.
Weld Road (1960) (威路律)	Jalan Raja Chulan	拉惹朱兰路		Currently (since 1982) named after Raja Chulan, Raja di Hilir Perak, the first Malay unofficial member of the Federal Council (1924–1933); formerly named after Sir Frederick Aloysius Weld (1823–1891), Governor of the Straits Settlements.
	Jalan Raja Laut	拉惹劳勿路		Named after Raja Laut, son of Sultan Muhammad, the Penghulu of Kuala Lumpur.
Segambut Road	Jalan Segambut	泗岩沫路		Located within the district of Segambut. It is a long stretch within the said district, connecting Jalan Tuanku Abdul Halim and Jalan Lang Emas at each end.
Semantan Road	Jalan Semantan	士曼丹路		Named after the Semantan suburb, located in Damansara Heights. Part of the Damansara Link of SPRINT.
Sentul Road	Jalan Sentul	冼都路		Located within the district of Sentul. A long stretch connecting Jalan Sultan Azlan Shah and Jalan Sentul Pasar at each end. Notable landmark along this road is the Sentul District Police Headquarters (IPD Sentul).
Treacher Road (地理者律)	Jalan Sultan Ismail	苏丹依斯迈路		Currently named after Sultan Ismail Nasiruddin Shah, the fourth Yang Di Pertuan Agong and is part of the Kuala Lumpur Inner Ring Road. Formerly named after William Hood Treacher. Sir William Hood Treacher (1849–1919), the first Governor of North Borneo (1881–1887), the sixth Resident of Selangor (1892–1896), the sixth British Resident of Perak (1896–1902), and the second Resident-General of Federated Malay States [1902–1904]. Sir William Hood Treacher supported the establishment of Victoria Institution in Kuala Lumpur and founded the Anglo Chinese School in Klang.
Sungai Besi Road	Jalan Sungai Besi	新街场路	is	Named after the district of Sungai Besi. It once housed the biggest open tin mine in the world in Sungai Besi.
Lornie Road	Jalan Syed Putra	赛布特拉路		Currently named after Tuanku Syed Putra, the third Yang di-Pertuan Agong. This road was formerly named after James Lornie, the 14th British Resident of Selangor (1927-1931).
Batu Road (1960)	Jalan Tuanku Abdul Rahman	东姑阿都拉曼路（華都律/峇都律）		Said to be the first road made of "batu" (stone), but actually named as the road goes to Batu from the old town centre. Currently named after Tuanku Abdul Rahman, the first Yang di-Pertuan Agong.
High Street (1960) (谐街)	Jalan Tun H S Lee	敦李孝式路		Currently named after Henry H.S. Lee, Malaysia's first finance minister (1957–1959). Originally named after the fact that the road was a "High Street" stretching across old Kuala Lumpur. Known as Jalan Bandar post-independence before taking its current name.
Java Street (爪哇街), Mountbatten Road (蒙巴登律)(1960).	Jalan Tun Perak	敦霹雳路		Currently named after Tun Perak. Formerly named after Louis Mountbatten, and earlier, Java.
Circular Road	Jalan Tun Razak	敦拉萨路		Formerly known as Jalan Pekeliling. Currently named after the second Prime Minister of Malaysia, Tun Abdul Razak. The Tun Razak Exchange (TRX) was named after this road and the second prime minister. It was originally named for its beltway-like layout. Part of Kuala Lumpur Middle Ring Road 1.
Brickfields Road (1960)	Jalan Tun Sambanthan	敦善班丹路		Currently named after V. T. Sambanthan, previously named after the district of Brickfields. The early Kuala Lumpur brick's plant owned by the Government was located here.
Foch Avenue (火治街，即指天街)	Jalan Tun Tan Cheng Lock	敦陈祯禄路 （pinyin: Chénzhénglù lù）		Currently named after Tan Cheng Lock, the first president of the Malayan Chinese Association (MCA).
Cross Street (哥洛士街)	Jalan Tun Tan Siew Sin	敦陈修信路		Renamed in 2003 after Malaysian Minister of Finance Tan Siew Sin, previously Jalan Silang or Cross Street.
Yap Ah Loy Road	Jalan Yap Ah Loy	叶亚来路 (pinyin: Yèyàlái lù)		Located near Jalan Tun Perak and named after Yap Ah Loy (1837–1885), the third and the longest term Capitan China (1869–1885).
Yap Kwan Seng Road	Jalan Yap Kwan Seng	叶观盛路 (pinyin: Yèguānshèng lù)		Named after Yap Kwan Seng, the first Chinese to serve on the Kuala Lumpur Sanitary Board, a member of the State Legislative Assembly of Selangor, the fifth and the last Capitan China (1889–1902). He has founded Pooi Shin Thong (renamed Tung Shin Hospital), co-founded the Tai Wah Ward of the Pauper's Hospital (the Kuala Lumpur General Hospital) and co-founded Victoria Institution. He gave $10,000 to the Transvaal War Fund and also donation to St. Mary's Church building fund. He assisted the governor Sir W.E. Maxwell in introducing the Chinese system of mining in West Africa. His residence was located on High Street.

== Other notable roads ==
Current, official name	Former, English name(s)	Chinese name	Note
Changkat Bukit Bintang	Jalan Hicks	章卡武吉免登	Located perpendicular to Jalan Bukit Bintang and Jalan Alor. The street is home to pubs and massage parlours, and is best known as one of Kuala Lumpur's red light districts.
Changkat Raja Chulan	Hicks Road	章卡拉惹朱兰	Named after F. B Hicks, Secretary of the Selangor Planters Association. He was one of the owners of the property around Hicks Road.
Changkat Thambi Dollah		章卡淡比多拉路	This road was named as such as it formerly led into Kampong Dollah.
Jalan Abang Haji Openg		阿邦哈吉奥本路	Named after Abang Haji Openg, the first Yang di-Pertua Negeri of Sarawak. It is located at Taman Tun Dr Ismail.
Jalan Abdul Manan Nordin	Jalan John Hands	阿都马南诺丁路	Named after Abdul Manan bin Nordin, who was Chief Draughtsman at the Revenue Survey Office for Selangor and Negeri Sembilan and was also a member of the Malay Agriculture Settlement Board. It is located at Kampung Baru.
Jalan Abdul Rahman Idris		阿都拉曼伊德里斯路	Named after Abdul Rahman Idris, who was a member of the Malay Agriculture Settlement Board and an active public figure. It is located at Kampung Baru.
Jalan Abdullah		阿都拉路	Jalan Abdullah is a main road in Bangsar. It leads to the KTMB Bangsar Railway Quarters.
Jalan Abraham		亚伯拉罕路	Named after Rev. Samuel Abraham, who was the Pastor of the Kuala Lumpur Tamil Church and the first headmaster of Anglo-Tamil School (now called the Methodist Boys' School.
Jalan Alor	Alor Street	亚罗街	Running parallel to Jalan Bukit Bintang, Jalan Alor is today best known for its wide variety of street food, especially Chinese and Thai cuisines. Formerly known as the red light district of Kuala Lumpur.
Jalan Ambong		安孟路	A road in Kepong Baru which is named after the Beach cabbage, which is known as "ambung-ambung" in Malay.
Jalan Aminuddin Baki		阿米努丁峇基路	Named after Aminuddin bin Baki, Father of Modern Education in Malaysia. Located at Taman Tun Dr Ismail.
Jalan Ampang Hilir	Lower Ampang Road	安邦希流路	Directly translated as "Lower Ampang Road", "hilir" is the Malay word for "lower".
Jalan Ampang Tengah		安邦登雅路	Directly translated as "Middle Ampang Road", "tengah" is the Malay word for "middle".
Jalan Ampang Ulu		安邦乌鲁路	Directly translated as "Upper Ampang Road", "hulu" is the Malay word for "upper".
Jalan Antoi	Jalan 20	安对路	A road in Kepong Baru which is named after the Cyathocalyx genus, which is known as "pokok antoi" in Malay.
Jalan Api-Api	Jalan 10 + Jalan 27	萤火虫路	A road in Kepong Baru which is named after the Avicennia genus, which is known as "pokok api-api" in Malay.
Jalan Ara		亚拉路	Located within Bangsar. The road's long stretch forms a crescent around the Bangsar Baru neighbourhood, representing as the border of the neighbourhood.
Jalan Arang	Jalan 4	煤炭路	A road in Kepong Baru which is named after the Diospyros genus, which is known as "pokok kayu arang" in Malay.
Jalan Asam Kumbang		亚三甘邦路	A road in Kepong Baru which is named after
Jalan Athinahapan		亚蒂那哈班路	Named after Tan Sri Athi Nahappan, former Malaysian Minister and Deputy of Malaysian Indian Congress (MIC). Located at Taman Tun Dr Ismail.
Jalan Awan Besar		阿旺柏沙路	"awan besar" is the Malay words of "big cloud". This road connects Jalan Gembira with Jalan Jalil Perkasa 1. This road also provides access to Shah Alam Expressway.
Jalan Bakau		峇高路	A road in Kepong Baru named after the genus Rhizophora, known as "bakau" in Malay.
Jalan Balai Polis	Station Street (1960)	警局街	Named after the Old High Street Police Station, a (partially demolished) police station in the vicinity. The road, which previously connected Petaling Street and High Street, was partially dismantled, cutting off the road from the latter.
Jalan Bangau		邦奥路	A road in Kepong Baru named after the Egret bird, known as "bangau" in Malay.
Jalan Barat		西路	Located beside the Tun Razak Exchange (TRX). The road is linked with the western end of Persiaran TRX. The name "Barat" is known as West in Malay.
Jalan Bayur		峇友路	A road in Kepong Baru named after the bayur tree (Pterospermum acerifolium).
Jalan Bebarau		柏峇勞路	A road in Kepong Baru named after the Straw-headed bulbul, known as "bebarau" in Malay.
Jalan Beberek		柏美乐路	A road in Kepong Baru named after the Bee-eater bird, known as "beberek" in Malay.
Jalan Belabas		柏拉巴路	A road in Kepong Baru named after the Pygmy goose bird, known as "belebas" in Malay.
Jalan Belatuk		柏拉篤路	A road in Kepong Baru named after the Woodpecker, known as "belatuk" in Malay.
Jalan Belfield	Belfield Road	裴斐路	Named after British Resident of Negri Sembilan, Henry Conway Belfield, (1901–1902), British Resident of Selangor, (1902–1910), who was also British Resident of Perak, (1910–1912).
Jalan Belibis		柏丽碑路	A road in Kepong Baru named after the Lesser whistling duck, known as "belibis" in Malay.
Jalan Belinggai		美灵街	A road in Kepong Baru named after the Wood-apple tree, known as "belinggai" in Malay.
Jalan Belinjau	Jalan 57	柏邻昭路	A road in Kepong Baru named after the tree Gnetum gnemon, known as "belinjau" in Malay.
Jalan Bellamy	Bellamy Road	贝拉米路	Named after H.F. Bellamy, the Superintendent of Selangor Public Works Department.
Jalan Benderung		班打隆路	A road in Kepong Baru named after the Indian charcoal-tree, known as "bendarung" in Malay.
Jalan Bengkudu		邦古都路	A road in Kepong Baru named after the Indian mulberry tree, known as "bengkudu" in Malay.
Jalan Bengkulang		邦加隆路	A road in Kepong Baru named after the Looking-glass mangrove, known as "bengkulang" in Malay.
Jalan Beremban		柏冷班路	A road in Kepong Baru named after the tree Duabanga sonneratioides, known as "beremban" in Malay.
Jalan Beresah		柏热沙路	A road in Kepong Baru named after the Pink shower, known as "beresah" in Malay.
Jalan Bergandai		柏甘代路	A road in Kepong Baru named after the tree Diospyros dictyoneura, known as "begandai" in Malay.
Jalan Berhala	Jalan Kandang Kerbau	柏哈拉路	Berhala is literally translated from Malay to English as "idols". Many Buddhist and Hindu Temples are located along this road.
Jalan Beringin		柏林京路	A ring road located within Damansara Heights, Segambut.
Jalan Berlian		柏连路	A road in Kepong Baru named after the Borneo ironwood tree, formerly known as "berlian" (currently belian) in Malay.
Jalan Berombong		柏龙邦路	A road in Kepong Baru named after the tree Nauclea junghuhnii, known as "berombong" in Malay.
Jalan Bidara	Jalan 46	比达拉路	A road in Kepong Baru named after the tree Arytera littoralis, known as "bedara" in Malay.
Jalan Binjai	Binjai Road	宾甲路	A road that connects Jalan Ampang and Persiaran KLCC on each end, Lorong Binjai is located between the stretch. The Binjai On The Park condominium is named after this road.
Jalan Bubut		武布路	A road in Kepong Baru named after the Coucal bird, known as "bubut" in Malay.
Jalan Bukit Aman	Bluff Road (1960)	武吉阿曼路	Currently named after Bukit Aman (Peace Hill), connecting the headquarters of the Royal Malaysian Police on the hill with Jalan Sultan Hishamuddin. It was formerly named Bluff Hill.
Jalan Bukit Ceylon	Ceylon Hill (1960)	武吉錫兰路	A hill road branching from Jalan Ceylon, named after the hill which it is located in (the hill, in turn, takes its name from the former name of Sri Lanka).
Jalan Bukit Nanas	Bukit Nanas Road	咖啡山路	Named after Bukit Nanas. A notable school named SMK Convent Bukit Nanas is located along this road.
Jalan Bukit Petaling	Bellamy Road (half)	八打灵高原路	Formerly named after H.F. Bellamy, the Superintendent of Selangor Public Works Department.
Jalan Bukit Tunku	Jalan Bukit Kenny	武吉东姑路	Located at Kenny Hills.
Jalan Bungur		文古路	A road in Kepong Baru named after the Crepe flower, known as "bungur" in Malay.
Jalan Burhanuddin Helmi		布哈努丁路	Located at Taman Tun Dr Ismail.
Jalan Boulevard	Boulevard Road	大道路	A new road that was built under the KL Metropolis development. MET 1 Residences and its buildings are located along this road.
Jalan Camar		查马路	A road in Kepong Baru named after the Laridae family, known as "camar" in Malay.
Jalan Carruthers	Carruthers Road	加洛德路	Named after John Bennett Carruthers, first Director of Agriculture and Government Botanist of the FMS. Road led to the quarters and property of the Agriculture Dept.
Jalan Cenderasari	Hospital Road, Young Road (1960), Tanglin Road	贞德拉沙利路	"Hospital Road" was derived from the presence of the Tangling Hospital up the hill, and Young Road was named after Sir Arthur Henderson Young, the British High Commissioner in Malaya.
Jalan Ceylon	Ceylon Lane (1960)	锡兰路	A hill road named after the former name of Sri Lanka.
Jalan Cenderawasih	Spooner Road	贞德拉瓦西路	Formerly named after Ernest John Spooner or Charles Edwin Spooner the State Engineer of Selangor and Director of Public Works Department.
Jalan Chan Sow Lin		陈秀连路	Named after Chan Sow Lin (1845–1927), pioneer in iron works, the founder of Chan Sow Lin & Co. Ltd., first local established engineering consultant, the first person to have imported advance tin dredging machinery from the Europe to be used for mining in Malaya. He was also an appointed member of the Selangor State Council (1902–1921). Co-founder of Tung Shin Hospital (previously known as Pooi Shin Thong) and Chan She Shu Yuen (Chan Clan Temple).
Jalan Chan Wing		陈振永路	Located at Imbi. Named after Chan Wing, a Chinese immigrant or a millionaire who built the mansion which was now as former Istana Negara at Jalan Istana.
Jalan Chiak		齐雅路	A road in Kepong Baru named after the chiak bird, which refers to sparrows, pipits and weavers in Malay.
Jalan Chiak Padang		甲峇登路	A road in Kepong Baru named after the Paddyfield Pipit, known as "chiak padang" in Malay.
Jalan Chiak Padi		甲峇底路	A road in Kepong Baru named after the White-rumped munia, known as "chiak padi" in Malay.
Jalan Chiak Raya		甲拉也路	A road in Kepong Baru named after the Baya weaver, known as "chiak raya" in Malay.
Jalan Chiak Tanah		甲丹拉路	A road in Kepong Baru named after the Richard's pipit, known as "chiak tanah" in Malay.
Jalan Choo Cheeng Kay		朱晴溪路	Named after Choo Cheeng Khay, a wealthy tin-miner and property developer.
Jalan Conlay	Conlay Road	康莱路	Named after the British Agent of Terengganu, William Lance Conlay, (1909–1913).
Jalan Dato' Onn	Brockman Road, Residency Road (1960)	拿督翁路	First named after the British Chief Secretary to the Federated Malay States (1911–1920), announced the establishment of the Town Planning Committee to oversee Kuala Lumpur town planning service. Sir Edward Lewis Brockman, also the British Resident of Pahang, (1909–1910). The name Residency was named after the official residence of Tunku. Currently named after Onn Jaafar.
Jalan Datuk Sulaiman		拿督苏莱曼路	Located at Taman Tun Dr Ismail
Jalan Dewan Sultan Sulaiman	Stony Road		
Jalan Davis	Davis Road	达维斯路	Named after Richard Pritchard Davis, former Government Town Planner of FMS.
Jalan Doraisamy		多莱沙米路	
Jalan Doktor Latif		拉迪夫医生路	Located at Kuala Lumpur Hospital.
Jalan Duta Kiara		杜达加拉路	A name combination of Jalan Duta and Jalan Kiara. The road is within the suburb of Mont Kiara with a bridge across the NKVE Highway, connecting Persiaran Dutamas on the other side.
Jalan Eaton	Eaton Road	伊顿路	Named after Lieutenant-Colonel Bertis James Eaton, former Director of the Rubber Research Institute of Malaya (RRI). The road links Jalan Kia Peng to Jalan Tun Razak.
Jalan Faraday	Faraday Road	法拉第路	It is located at Tenaga Nasional Berhad (TNB) Headquarters near Jalan Pantai Baharu
Jalan Foss	Foss Road	霍斯路	Located at Pudu. The road was named after Josephine Foss, former headmistress of Pudu Girls' School.
Jalan Gallagher	Gallagher Road	加拉格路	
Jalan Galloway	Galloway Road	加罗威路	
Jalan Gembira		快乐路	Named after the Sanskrit word "gambhara", which means "cheerful", it is the main vehicular route of Happy Garden.
Jalan Gereja	Church Street (1960)	節士街	Named after the a local St. John's Cathedral. Currently merged with Jalan Ampang, the name is retained on a few connected lanes (as Lorong Gereja).
Jalan Haji Yahya Sheikh Ahmad	Watson Road	哈芝亚雅锡阿末路	Named after the British Resident of Perak, Sir Reginald George Watson.
Jalan Helang		合浪路	A road in Kepong Baru named after the Eagle, which is known as "helang" in Malay.
Jalan Helang Belalang		荷朗柏拉浪路	A road in Kepong Baru named after the Black-thighed falconet, which is known as "helang belalang" in Malay.
Jalan Helang Bukit		合朗武吉路	A road in Kepong Baru named after the Mountain eagle, which is known as "helang bukit" in Malay.
Jalan Helang Hindik		合朗欣狄路	A road in Kepong Baru named after the Changeable hawk-eagle, which is known as "helang hindik" in Malay.
Jalan Helang Jambu		荷朗江末路	A road in Kepong Baru named after the Crested serpent eagle, which is known as "helang jambul" in Malay.
Jalan Helang Laut		合朗拉勿路	A road in Kepong Baru named after the white-bellied sea eagle, which is known as "helang laut" in Malay. Jalan Lang Perut Putih and Jalan Helang Siput are also named after the same bird.
Jalan Helang Merah		合朗美拉路	A road in Kepong Baru named after the Brahminy kite, which is known as "helang melah" in Malay.
Jalan Helang Sewah		合朗西华路	A road in Kepong Baru named after the Japanese sparrowhawk, which is known as "helang sewah" in Malay.
Jalan Helang Siput		荷朗溪埠路	A road in Kepong Baru named after the white-bellied sea eagle, which is known as "helang siput" in Malay. Jalan Lang Perut Putih and Jalan Helang Laut are also named after the same bird.
Jalan Hose	Hose Road (part of) (1960)	荷西路	Both Jalan Belfield and Jalan Hose have existed as early as 1960, and that the name of the latter is still retained for both roads. Hose Road was formerly named after Edward Shaw Hose, former Chairman of KL Sanitary Board.
Jalan Jinjang Utama	Main Street, Jalan Limbang	增江主路	Located in Jinjang, It is the main road of the new village. It was formerly named after the Limbang Division in Sarawak.
Jalan Kampung Attap	Kampong Attap Road	甘榜亚答路	
Jalan Kampung Bandar Dalam		甘榜班达达南路	Located between Sentul and Gombak.
Jalan Kampung Pandan	Kampung Pandan Road	甘榜班登路	Located within Kampung Pandan and Desa Pandan. The Setiawangsa–Pantai Expressway (SPE) is elevated on top of the whole stretch.
Jalan Kampung Pasir		甘榜巴西	A long stretch that goes through Pantai Dalam and Kampung Pasir.
Jalan Kebun Bunga	Orchid Road	哥文班雅路	Named after the Lake Gardens, where orchids were planted around the gardens.
Jalan Kelicap		哥哩厝路	A road in Kepong Baru named after the Sunbird, known as "kelicap" in Malay.
Jalan Kia Peng	Kia Peng Road	嘉炳路	Named after Choo Kia Peng. Choo Kia Peng, a Federal Councillor. One of the distinguished elected members of the Royal Selangor Golf Club (RSGC) and he had been a respected Member since 1909. The first Vice President and one of the Founder Members of the Rotary Club of Kuala Lumpur (inaugurated on 27 September 1929). Jalan Kia Peng was a residential area for prominent figures in the past with structures like the Istana Hinggap Terengganu and Istana Kelantan. The home of Malaysia's first prime minister, Tunku Abdul Rahman, was located at 1 Jalan Kia Peng; it now serves as the chancery of the Embassy of the Philippines in Kuala Lumpur.
Jalan Kiara		加拉路	A road named after the suburb of Mont "Kiara".
Jalan Ledang	Guillemard Road	奎马路	Sir Laurence Guillemard was Governor for the Straits Settlement and High Commissioner for Federated Malay States. Currently named after Mount Ledang (Mount Ophir) in Johor.
Jalan Langgak Golf	Golf View Road	冷卡高尔夫路	
Jalan Langgak Tunku		朗格东姑路	Located at Kenny Hills (Bukit Tunku).
Jalan Leong Yew Koh		梁宇皋路	Located at Taman Tun Dr Ismail.
Jalan Madge	Madge Road	美奇路	Located at Taman U-Thant.
Jalan Mahkamah Persekutuan	Jalan Belanda or Holland Road (1960)	联邦法院路	Situated behind the Sultan Abdul Samad Building, and along the Gombak River and the Klang River (after the confluence of the rivers). Currently named after the Malaysian Federal Court which was based in the area. Formerly named after Hugh Holland.
Jalan Mahkamah Tinggi	Clarke Road (1960)	高庭路	A short road that connects Jalan Mahkamah Persekutuan with Jalan Raja Laut, passing between the south side of the Sultan Abdul Samad Building, and the Old Post Office/former Court of Appeal building and Industrial Court. Currently named after the Malaysian High Court, which is based in the Sultan Abdul Samad Building. Formerly named after Sir Andrew Clarke, the Governor of the Straits Settlements (1873–1875).
Jalan Melayu	Malay Street (1960)	马来尤路	A street connecting Jalan Tuanku Abdul Rahman and Jalan Tun Perak via a route passing the Klang River. The road was recently refurbished with the addition of canopy roofs and new street furnitures added along the road, in conjunction with the remodeling of the south end of Jalan Masjid India as a pedestrian street.
Jalan Mergastua			A major thoroughfare in Kepong Baru, mergastua means "wild animals" in Old Malay.
Jalan Munshi Abdullah		文西阿都拉路	Named after Munshi Abdullah, who is also known as Abdullah Abdul Kadir.
Jalan Pantai Dalam		班底达南路	A long stretch that runs through the suburb of Pantai Dalam.
Jalan Pasar		巴刹路	Located at Pudu district. The name Pasar is known as market in Malay.
Jalan Peel	Peel Road	啤路	Named after Sir William Peel (1875–1945), British Chief Secretary of the Federated Malay States and Governor of Hong Kong.
Jalan Pelanduk		柏兰篤路	A road in Kepong Baru named after the Horsfield's babbler, known as "burung pelanduk" in Malay.
Jalan Perdana	Venning Road	柏兰岭路	Named after Alfred R. Venning, the first Chairman of Sanitary Board, who proposed to establish a Public Gardens in 1888, which was later renamed as Lake Gardens, and the first golf course near Damansara Road.
Jalan Pudu Lama	Old Pudu Road (1960)	旧半山芭路	A back road connecting to Jalan Pudu, which passes through pre-war residential houses.
Jalan Puncak	Peak Road	山顶路	Puncak is literally translated from Malay as "peak".
Jalan Putra		柏特拉路	Named after the Putra World Trade Centre (PWTC), currently known as World Trade Centre Kuala Lumpur (WTC KL). The Sunway Putra Mall is named after this road.
Jalan Rahim Kajai		拉欣卡宰路	Named after Abdul Rahim bin Haji Salim, the Father of Malay Journalism. His pen name was Abdul Rahim Kajai. Located at Taman Tun Dr Ismail
Jalan Raja Abdullah	Hale Road	拉惹阿都拉路	Named after Sultan Abdul Samad's father Raja Abdullah. Previously named after former Larut District Officer, A. Hale.
Jalan Raja Alang	Perkins Road	拉惹亚朗路	Named after Selangor's royal family member, Raja Alang. Previously named after C.J Perkins, Deputy Surveyor-General of the FMS and Straits Settlements
Jalan Raja Bot		拉惹伯路	Named after Selangor's royal family member, Raja Bot.
Jalan Raja Muda Abdul Aziz	Princes Road		Currently named after Raja Muda Abdul Aziz (Sultan Salahuddin Abdul Aziz Shah) of Selangor
Jalan Raja Muda Musa			Named after Raja Muda Musa (Sultan Musa Ghiatuddin Riayat Shah) of Selangor
Jalan Rakyat	Travers Road (until 2015) (Damansara Road)	人民路	The change is only for a 300-metre stretch that links the Jalan Tun Sambanthan intersection with the intersection between Jalan Bangsar and Jalan Travers. It was erected in 2015 after the nearest Bank Rakyat headquarters in KL Sentral. Formerly named after Dr. Ernest Aston Otho Travers, the State Surgeon of Selangor, (1891–1897). He was the doctor who brought about reform in the care of leprosy patients. He had recommended an asylum be erected for leprosy patients near the Pauper Hospital, a settlement free of high walls and barbed wires. Previously named after the district of Damansara or the Damansara River.
Jalan RISDA			Named after the Rubber Industry Smallholders Development Authority (RISDA). It is located in Desa Pahlawan, Ampang.
Jalan Ritchie	Ritchie Road	里奇路	Located between Jalan Ampang and Jalan Ampang Hilir.
Jalan Robson	Robson Road	罗布森路	Named after founder editor John Henry Matthew Robson of The Malay Mail newspaper, the first daily newspaper published in the Federated Malay States, 1896. Assistant District Officer at Rawang, a member of the first Federal Council, President of the Royal Lake Club (1908).
Jalan Robertson	Robertson Road	罗柏森路	
Jalan Sentul Pasar		冼都巴刹路	Named after Pasar Sentul which is located along the road, and is within the district of Sentul.
Jalan Scott	Scott Road		
Jalan Samarahan 1	River Road North		Located in Jinjang, it was paved in 2007 and named after the Samarahan Division in Sarawak.
Jalan Samarahan 2	Ulu Klang Street		Located in Jinjang, it was paved in 2007 and named after the Samarahan Division in Sarawak.
Jalan Samarahan 6	Cheras Street		Located in Jinjang, it was paved in 2007 and named after the Samarahan Division in Sarawak.
Jalan Semarang	Broadrick Road		Named after the British Resident of Selangor, Edward George Broadrick, (1913–1919).
Jalan Serian 1	Tanjung Malim Street		Located in Jinjang, it was paved in 2007 and named after the Serian town in Sarawak.
Jalan Sin Chee			
Jalan Sin Chew Kee			
Jalan Sri Amar			
Jalan Sultan Abdul Samad			
Jalan Sultan Haji Ahmad Shah	Jalan Khidmat Usaha (until 2014)		Erected in 2014 and was named after the seventh Yang di-Pertuan Agong, Sultan Ahmad Shah of Pahang.
Jalan Stadium	Stadium Road		Built in 1957 and named after the Merdeka Stadium. The Merdeka 118 and its precinct are located along this road.
Jalan Changkat Stadium	Stadium Ghaut		Built in 1957 and named after the Merdeka Stadium
Jalan Shelley	Shelley Road		Located near Jalan Cochrane
Jalan Stonor	Stonor Road		Named after the British Resident of Selangor, Oswald Francis Gerard Stonor, (1921–1926) and Resident of Perak 1926 – 1927.
Jalan Sultan Azlan Shah	Jalan Ipoh (half) (until 2014)		Erected in 2014 and was named after ninth Yang di-Pertuan Agong, Sultan Azlan Shah of Perak.
Jalan Sultan Hishamuddin	Victory Avenue (1960)		Named after Sultan Hishamuddin of Selangor and the second Yang Di Pertuan Agong. Terminates at the Jalan Raja Laut-Lebuh Pasar Besar-Jalan Sultan Hishamuddin crossroad in the north, and the north and of Jalan Travers from the south. The road notably passes the Kuala Lumpur Railway Station, Dayabumi complex and Masjid Negara (the National Mosque).
Jalan Sultan Mizan Zainal Abidin	Jalan Khidmat Setia and Jalan Ibadah (until 2014)		Erected in 2014 and was named after thirteenth Yang di-Pertuan Agong, Sultan Mizan Zainal Abidin of Terengganu.
Jalan Sultan Salahuddin	Swettenham Road (1960)		Currently named after Sultan Salahuddin of Malaysia; previously named after Frank Swettenham. Sir Frank Athelstane Swettenham (1850–1946) was the 3rd Resident for Selangor (1882–1896), the 5th British Resident of Perak and the first Resident General of the Federated Malay States (1896 to 1901). Sir F.A. Swettenham was influential for making Kuala Lumpur the capital of administration of Selangor and initiated construction on the Klang–Kuala Lumpur Railway (completed in 1886). Under the patronage of Sir F.A. Swettenham, the Selangor Turf Club was founded in 1896.
Jalan Sultan Sulaiman	Suleiman Road	蘇来曼路	Named after Sultan Sulaiman of Selangor.
Jalan Sultan Yahya Petra	Henry Gurney Road (1960) Jalan Semarak (until 2014)		Erected in 2014 and was named after sixth Yang di-Pertuan Agong, Sultan Yahya Petra of Kelantan. Previously named after Sir Henry Gurney, a former British High Commissioner in Malaya.
Jalan Tangsi	Barrack Road		Previously connected directly to Dataran Merdeka via the southeast stretch of Jalan Raja, and currently cut off from the area with the construction of the Jalan Kuching-Jalan Kinabalu-Jalan Parlimen expressway.
Jalan Talalla			
Jalan Thambipillay			
Jalan Thambusamy			Named after K. Thamboosamy Pillay, the leader of the Tamil community, one of the founders of Victoria Institution and discovered the Batu Caves.
Jalan Thavers			Located at Kampung Pandan
Jalan Titiwangsa			Located within the suburb of Titiwangsa.
Jalan Travers	Damansara Road		Named after Dr. Ernest Aston Otho Travers, the State Surgeon of Selangor, (1891–1897). He was the doctor who brought about reform in the care of leprosy patients. He had recommended an asylum be erected for leprosy patients near the Pauper Hospital, a settlement free of high walls and barbed wires. Previously named after the district of Damansara or the Damansara River. A section of Jalan Travers was renamed as Jalan Rakyat.
Jalan Tugu	Cenotaph Road (1960)		Named after a cenotaph which was located on the intersection of Cenotaph Road and Victory Avenue. The cenotaph was moved to the National Monument (Tugu Negara) when a flyover was constructed over the area during the 1960s.
Jalan Tun Abang Haji Openg			Located at Taman Tun Dr Ismail.
Jalan Tun Ismail	Maxwell Road		Formerly named after Sir William Edward Maxwell(1846–1897), Acting Resident Councillor of Penang (1887–1889), Resident of Selangor (1889–1892), Acting Governor of the Straits Settlements between (1893–94). Straits Settlements Governor. Later, the Governor of the Gold Coast (Ghana) in West Africa. Maxwell Hill (Bukit Larut) was founded in 1884 by William Edward Maxwell, the British Assistant Resident of Perak to Sir Hugh Low. He has also written A Manual of the Malay Language (1881). Sir William George Maxwell (1871–1959), the eldest son of William Edward Maxwell, British Adviser to Kedah (1909–1915) and (1918–1919), British Resident of Perak (1919–1921), and Chief Secretary of Federated Malay States (1921–1926). Sultan Idris Training College in Perak was opened by him and SMK Maxwell (Maxwell School) in Kuala Lumpur was named after him.
Jalan Tuanku Abdul Halim	Guillemard Road (until 1960) Jalan Duta (until 2014)		Erected in 2014 and was named after fifth and fourteen Yang di-Pertuan Agong, Tuanku Abdul Halim Muadzam Shah of Kedah.
Jalan Tun Mohd Fuad			Located at Taman Tun Dr Ismail
Jalan Tunku Putra	Natesa Road		Currently named after Tunku Abdul Rahman, Malaysia's first prime minister.
Jalan U-Thant		宇丹路	Currently named after the former UN secretary-general from 1961 until 1971, U Thant.
Jalan Vivekananda		维韦卡南达路	A road located in Brickfields. This road is named after Swami Vivekananda, an Indian Hindu monk, philosopher, author, religious teacher, and the chief disciple of the Indian mystic Ramakrishna; which visited Malaya in 1893.
Jalan Walter Grenier	Walter Grenier Road	瓦特格林尼尔路	Named after Walter John Piachaud Grenier, an accountant and a former member of the KL Sanitary Board.
Jalan Wan Kadir		万卡迪尔路	Located at Taman Tun Dr Ismail. Named after UMNO politician Wan Kadir bin Ismail.
Jalan Wesley	Wesley Road	卫斯理路	This road leads to the Wesley Methodist Church.
Jalan Wickham	Wickham Road		
Jalan Wisma Putra	Hose Drive		Currently named after the original Ministry of Foreign Affairs building at the road; formerly named after Edward Shaw Hose. The road is related to Jalan Belfied and remaining roads by the name of Hose.
Jalan Yaacob Latif	Jalan Tenteram		Located in Bandar Tun Razak, it was established in 2003 and named the second Kuala Lumpur city mayor Tan Sri Yaacob Latif
Jalan Yap Ah Shak		叶亚石路	Named after Yap Ah Shak, the fourth Capitan China (1885–1889).
Jalan Yap Tai Chi		叶大池路	Located at Jalan Imbi
Jalan Yew			Located at Sungai Besi
Jalan Zaaba			Located at Taman Tun Dr Ismail.
Jalan Abdul Razak Hussin			Located at Desa Tun Hussein Onn. It was named after soldiers who died during the Communist insurgency in Malaysia.
Jalan Abdul Rashid			Located at Desa Tun Hussein Onn. It was named after soldiers who died during the Communist insurgency in Malaysia (1968–89).
Jalan Lenggu Ak China			Located at Desa Tun Hussein Onn. It was named after soldiers who died during the Communist insurgency in Malaysia (1968–89).
Jalan Rosli Buang			Located at Desa Tun Hussein Onn. It was named after soldiers who died during the Communist insurgency in Malaysia (1968–89).
Jalan Hamid Ismail			Located at Desa Tun Hussein Onn. It was named after soldiers who died during the Communist insurgency in Malaysia (1968–89).
Jalan Saimun Tarikat			Located at Desa Tun Hussein Onn. It was named after soldiers who died during the Communist insurgency in Malaysia (1968–89).
Jalan Mohana Chandran			Located at Desa Tun Hussein Onn. It was named after soldiers who died during the Communist insurgency in Malaysia (1968–89).
Lebuh Menjalara	Menjalara Street		Named after the suburb of Bandar Menjalara. The DUKE Phase 2 highway (Sri Damansara Link) is situated along and on top of the whole stretch.
Lebuh Pudu	Pudu Street		Also known as Leboh Pudu. The street is located next to Petaling Street (Chinatown).
Lebuhraya Sultan Iskandar	Lebuhraya Mahameru (until 2014)	苏丹依斯干达大道	Erected in 2014 and was named after eighth Yang di-Pertuan Agong, Sultan Iskandar of Johor. It is part of the Kuala Lumpur Middle Ring Road 1.
Lingkaran Syed Putra	Mid Valley City Ring Road		A ring road that circles around Mid Valley Megamall and The Gardens Mall, located within Mid Valley City.
Lingkaran SV			A ring road around the Sunway Velocity development and was built by Sunway Group. The name "SV" is short for "Sunway Velocity", hence the name.
Lingkaran TRX			Part of the upcoming ring road formation within the Tun Razak Exchange (TRX) district. The Exchange 106 is located along this road.
Lorong Binjai		宾甲巷	A no-through road connected on one end to Jalan Binjai. Located at KLCC.
Lorong Chan Ah Thong		陈亚棠巷	Located in Brickfields, Named after Chan Ah Thong.
Lorong Haji Taib			Located at Chow Kit. It was named after an Indonesian tradesman of Minangkabau heritage and originated from Sumatera, known as Haji Mohamed Taib bin Haji Abdul Samad.
Lorong Kelab Polo Diraja			Named after the Kuala Lumpur Polo Club at its end.
Lorong Kuda			Joins and connects with the KLCC Tunnel at the west end.
Lorong Stonor			Named after the British Resident of Selangor, Oswald Francis Gerard Stonor. It is a narrow road with high-end condominiums and apartments. The road connects Persiaran Stonor with an open air carpark at the end.
Persiaran Dutamas			Named after the suburb of Dutamas located in Segambut. The road is a long stretch from Jalan Dutamas 1 to the Jalan Dutamas 5 roundabout.
Persiaran Hampshire	Hampshire Drive		The 157 Hampshire Place as well as Hampshire Residences are named after this road.
Persiaran Jalil Utama			Named after the suburb of Bukit Jalil. It provides access to Bukit Jalil Highway and shopping malls, such as Pavilion Bukit Jalil and Aurora Place Bukit Jalil.
Persiaran KLCC		城中城道	Named after the KLCC development. The avenue was built to skirt the KLCC Park though the eastern side which takes over stretches of existing Jalan Binjai and Jalan Stonor. The Persiaran KLCC MRT station was named after this road.
Persiaran Maybank	Court Hill 玻璃廳山		A hill back road that connects Jalan Pudu Lama with Jalan Raja Chulan. Currently named after the Maybank Tower that is built on a hill, and formerly named after a Sessions Court which resided on the same site, circa 1960. The old name remains in Malay form on a road that connects Jalan Raja Chulan with Persiaran Maybank, dubbed Jalan Bukit Mahkamah (Court Hill Road). A road which stemmed from Klyne Street (Jalan Hang Lekiu) named Courts of Justice Road once led to the courts. It is now a narrow road linking Jalan Hang Lekiu and Jalan Raja Chulan. In Chinese, this foothill area was known as 玻璃廳山脚.
Persiaran Parkview	Parkview Drive		Located in Taman Kaya, the road links Jalan Ipoh with Maple Drive. Among the residences along this road are Sang Suria Condominiums and The Maple.
Persiaran Petronas			Named after Petronas (Petroliam Nasional Berhad). The Petronas Twin Towers, Mandarin Oriental and Petronas Tower 3 are located along this road and is also part of the KLCC development. The road connects Persiaran KLCC and Jalan Pinang at each end.
Persiaran Raja Chulan	Weld Drive (1960)		A hill back road branching from Jalan Raja Chulan. Currently named after Raja Chulan; formerly named after Frederick Weld.
Persiaran Stonor	Stonor Drive		Named after the British Resident of Selangor, Oswald Francis Gerard Stonor. The road connects Jalan Tun Razak with Jalan Stonor at each end.
Persiaran Sultan Salahuddin	Clifford Road		Named after Sir Hugh Charles Clifford (1866–1941) the Resident at Pahang (1896–1900, 1901–1903), Governor of North Borneo (1900–1901), Governor of Straits Settlements and British High Commissioner in Malaya (1927–1930).
Persiaran Syed Putra			Named after Tuanku Syed Putra, the third Yang di-Pertuan Agong.
Persiaran TRX			A road built for the Tun Razak Exchange (TRX) to ease traffic.
Persiaran Tuanku Jaafar	Swettenham Drive (1960) Persiaran Mahameru (until 2014)		Erected in 2014 and was named after tenth Yang di-Pertuan Agong, Tuanku Jaafar of Negeri Sembilan. Formerly named after Sir Frank Swettenham, the first Resident General of the Federated Malay States (1896 to 1901).
Persiaran Tuanku Syed Sirajuddin	Persiaran Duta		Erected in 2014 and was named after twelfth Yang di-Pertuan Agong, Tuanku Syed Sirajuddin of Perlis.

== See also ==
- Street names of George Town, Penang
- List of roads in Ipoh
- List of old and new road names in Taiping
