= Arthur Henry Lemon =

British colonial administrator (1864 – 1933)

Arthur Henry Lemon CMG

British Resident of Selangor
- In office 1919–1921
- Preceded by: Edward George Broadrick
- Succeeded by: Oswald Francis Gerard Stonor

British Resident at Negeri Sembilan
- In office 1912–1919
- Preceded by: Richard James Wilkinson
- Succeeded by: John Richard Oliver Aldworth

Personal details
- Born: 23 August 1864
- Died: January 1933 (aged 68); Reigate, England
- Spouse: Grace Harrison
- Children: 1

Arthur Henry Lemon CMG (23 August 1864 – January 1933) was a British colonial administrator who served in Malaya.

== Early life ==
Arthur Henry Lemon was born on 23 August 1864 in Blackheath, son of W.G. Lemon, barrister-at-law, Lincoln's Inn. He was educated at Merchant Taylors' School, and Exeter College, Oxford.

== Career ==
In 1888, Lemon joined the civil service of the Straits Settlements, and began his career as Private Secretary to the Governor. In 1893, he was appointed Acting District Officer, South Malacca, and then spent two years in Singapore as Acting Assistant Colonial Secretary and Acting Third Magistrate. From 1895–6, he was Acting District Officer in Malacca and Province Wellesley, and in 1898 was appointed Acting Second Magistrate and Assistant Postmaster-General, Penang. From 1902–3, he occupied the posts of Second Assistant Colonial Secretary, and Acting Collector of Land Revenue and Registrar of Deeds, Penang.

In 1906, he was called to the Bar, Lincoln's Inn, and returned to Singapore where he was appointed Acting Assistant Colonial Secretary, and Acting Assistant to the Clerk of the Courts.

In 1910, he went to the Federated Malay States, and occupied the posts of Acting Legal Adviser to the Government and Under-Secretary to the Government of the FMS. In 1912, he was appointed British Resident, Negeri Sembilan, and in 1919, British Resident, Selangor, remaining in the post until his retirement in 1921.

== Personal life ==
In 1925, he retired to Reigate, Surrey, where he died in January, 1933 leaving a widow Grace Harrison, whom he married in 1898, and an only child, Hugh.

== Honours and legacy ==
Lemon was awarded the CMG in 1919. Lemon Street (now Jalan Tuanku Munawir) in Seremban, was named after him.
