= Josephine Foss =

Anglican missionary teacher and welfare worker

Josephine Foss (1887–1983) was an Anglican missionary teacher and welfare worker in Kuala Lumpur.

Foss was active in missionary and teaching work from 1914 to 1983. In 1914, along with Elinor Gage-Brown, she founded the Pudu English School in Kuala Lumpur. She was the school's second and longest serving headmistress for sixteen years, from 1926 to 1942, and the school was one of the earliest to teach girls in English there. Foss used sports such as badminton, tennis, netball, and basketball as a way to free young women from the restrictions of traditional gender roles in Asia, believing sports and an English speaking teaching environment created "athletic, happy, healthy and normal girls, far better fitted to take their share in the struggle for existence in Malaya than their less fortunate uneducated sisters." In 1942, Foss was taken prisoner by Japanese soldiers during World War II.

Jalan Foss (Foss street) in Kuala Lumpur is named after her. She is buried in St. Andrew's Cathedral in Singapore.
