= John Bennett Carruthers =

British agriculturalist

- Born: 19 January 1869
- Died: 17 July 1910 (aged 41)
- Occupation: Agriculturalist

John Bennett Carruthers FRSE, FLS (19 January 1869 – 17 July 1910) was a British agriculturalist. He served as Director of Agriculture and as Government Botanist in the Federated Malay States at the beginning of the twentieth century during the era of rapid growth of the rubber industry in the Malay Peninsula.

== Career ==
John Bennett Caruthers, began his career as Demonstrator of Botany at Royal Veterinary College of Great Britain, before becoming Professor of Botany at Downtown College of Agriculture, and then assistant Consulting Botanist at the Royal Agricultural Society of England.

In 1900, he went to Ceylon (now Sri Lanka) having accepted the position of Assistant Director and Mycologist at the Royal Botanic Gardens in Peradeniya investigating, in particular, the cultivation of tea and rubber, and was promoted to Director in 1902, having previously been sent out from England to Ceylon in 1897 for a year to investigate cacao disease.

In 1905, he left Ceylon and, having declined an offer to work at Pusa, India, as Biological Botanist, went to the Malay Peninsula to take up the appointment as the first Director of newly created Agriculture Department of the Federated Malay States. He was also appointed to the position of Government Botanist. During his tenure he published about 50 papers in scientific journals, mainly on the cultivation of rubber, cocoa and coconut, and was also co-editor of the Straits Agricultural Bulletin.

In 1909, he resigned his position in the Federated Malay States, and took up the appointment of Assistant Director of the Royal Botanic Gardens, at Port of Spain, Trinidad, but died after less than a year in the post.

== Personal life ==
Carruthers was born on 19 January 1869. He was the second son of William Carruthers who was head of the Botanical Department of the British Museum. He was educated at Dulwich College and Griefswald University. He was a keen footballer and played for United London Scottish F. C, and for ten years was a volunteer in the London Scottish Regiment. On 27 February 1900 he married Francis Helen Lomax Inglis. He died in Trinidad due to a lung abscess on 17 July 1910, aged 41.
