= Kepong Baru =

Suburb of Kuala Lumpur, Malaysia

Coordinates: 3°12′28″N 101°38′33″E

Kepong Baru 甲洞卫星市
- Suburb
- Location of Kuala Lumpur
- Country: Malaysia
- Federal Territory: Kuala Lumpur
- Constiuency: Kepong (federal constituency)

Government
  - City council: Kuala Lumpur City Hall (DBKL)
- Postcode: 52100

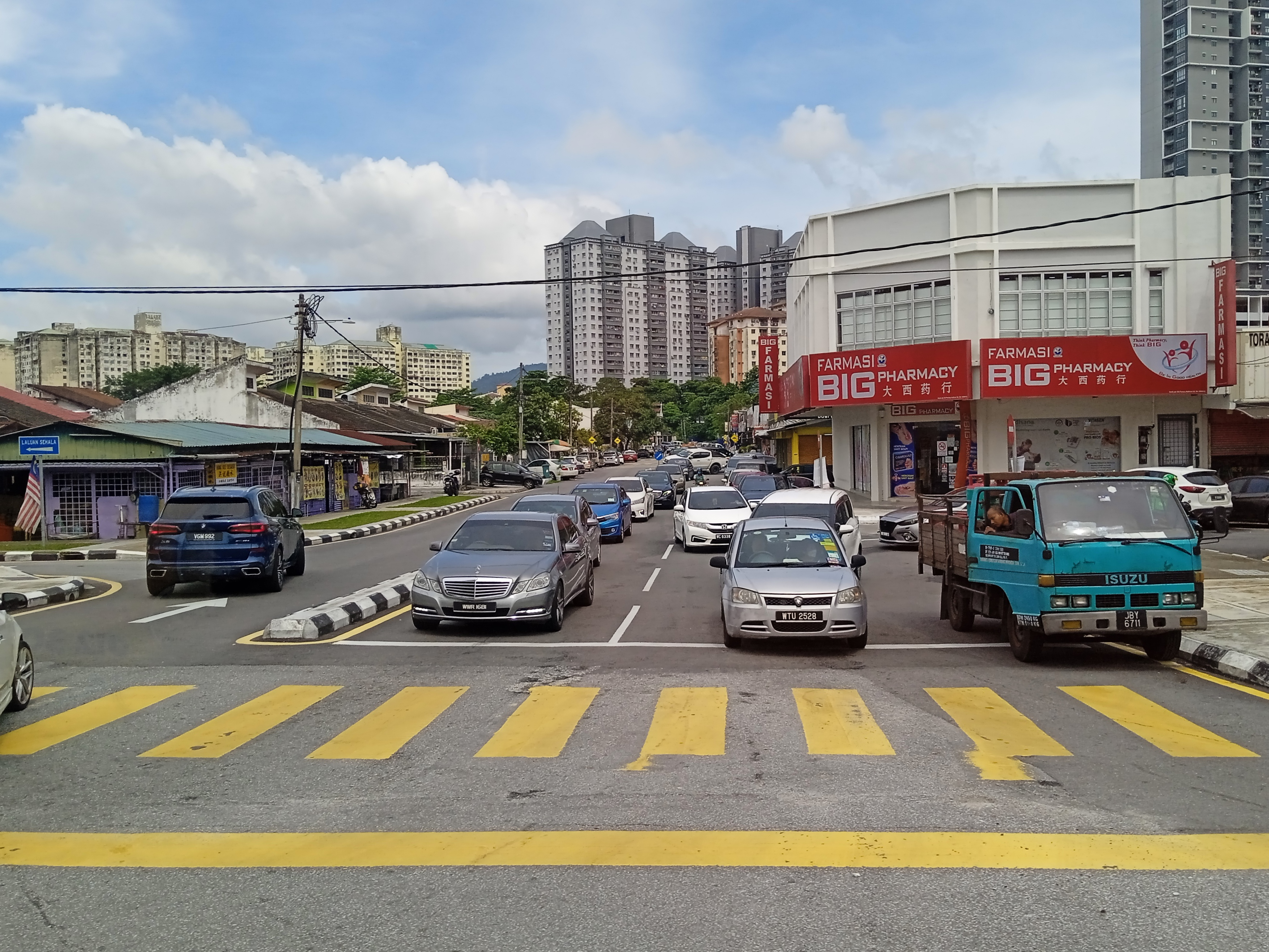
Kepong Baru in 2023

Kepong Baru is a suburb in Kepong, Kuala Lumpur, Malaysia. It is located between Bandar Menjalara, Taman Usahawan and Segambut. There is a MRT station at Kepong Baru opened in 2021, named Kepong Baru MRT station. Its Chinese name is 甲洞卫星市, which means Kepong satellite city. There is a notable morning wet market in Kepong Baru.
