= Ernest Aston Otho Travers =

British doctor (1864–1934)

- Born: 2 June 1864
- Died: 9 November 1934 (aged 70); Saffron Walden
- Occupation: Doctor
- Years active: 1887-1925
- Employer: Malay civil service
- Known for: Pioneering treatment of leprosy
- Spouse: Married
- Children: 3

Ernest Aston Otho Travers (2 June 1864 – 9 November 1934) was a British doctor known for his pioneering work in the treatment of leprosy in Malaya.

== Career ==
Ernest Aston Otho Travers MRCS, LRCP, was born on 2 June 1864. He went to Malaya in 1887 where he was appointed Residency Surgeon of Negeri Sembilan, and was Acting Magistrate and Acting Protector of Indian Immigrants. In 1889, he was Residency Surgeon, Selangor, and Health Officer for three years, before he was appointed State Surgeon, Selangor in 1897. He remained in the post until 1909 when he went into private practice.

During the First World War he served in the Royal Army Medical Corps, and in 1919 returned to Malaya. From 1921, he was Head of the District Hospital and the Leper Asylum in Kuala Lumpur, before retiring to England in 1925.

== Legacy and personal life ==
It is his work with lepers and the treatment of leprosy that he is most remembered. He pioneered a revolutionary technique for the treatment of the disease with the use of the Hydnocarpus anthelmintica nut which proved effective in reducing the mortality rate. In addition, he improved the conditions of patients. At the time, lepers were treated as outcasts, segregated in prisonlike conditions, with little regard for their welfare. He built modern facilities, provided clubs and schools, and ensured that the patients received proper medical attention. His pioneering work was acknowledged by the government which subsequently approved his proposal for the construction of a new model village for patients at Sungei Buloh.

Travers died in Saffron Walden, Essex on 9 November 1934, leaving a widow and two daughters; a son having predeceased him. In 1937, a marble tablet was erected in his memory at St. Mary's Cathedral, Kuala Lumpur. Several roads were named after him including Travers Road (now Jalan Rakyat) in Kuala Lumpur.
