= Desa Tun Hussein Onn =

Malaysian Armed Forces Residential Area

Coordinates: 3.181561°N 101.733925°E

Desa Tun Hussein Onn is the Malaysian Armed Forces residential area in Kuala Lumpur, Malaysia. This special residential area is located near Setiawangsa in the south and Wangsa Maju in the north. It is located beside the Malaysian Ministry of Defence.

== History ==
The special residential area was formerly part of Hawthornden Estate, which contained rubber plantations on previous mining land. It was developed into a housing estate specifically for the armed forces in 1990.

The Desa Tun Hussein Onn housing development project built 2,016 units of flats, mostly for officers of lower rank, and this helped in a large way to satisfy the urgent housing requirements for the armed forces at the time.

== Memorials ==
The roads were named after soldiers who died fighting against the Malayan Communist Party during Communist insurgency in Malaysia (1968–89) in Malaya and who were conferred the Seri Pahlawan Gagah Perkasa (SP), an award given to those who show extraordinary courage.

=== List of roads ===
- Jalan Abdul Razak Hussin
- Jalan Abdul Rashid
- Jalan Lenggu ak China
- Jalan Rosli Buang
- Jalan Hamid Ismail
- Jalan Saimun Tarikat
- Jalan Mohana Chandran

== Residential areas ==
- Flat Desa Tun Hussein Onn
- Malaysian Army Residential Flats

== Education ==
- Sekolah Kebangsaan Desa Tun Hussein Onn
- Sekolah Menengah Kebangsaan Desa Tun Hussein Onn
- Sekolah Rendah Agama Jaafar Bin Abi Talib
- Sekolah Kebangsaan Kementah
