= Jalan Imbi =

Road in Malaysia

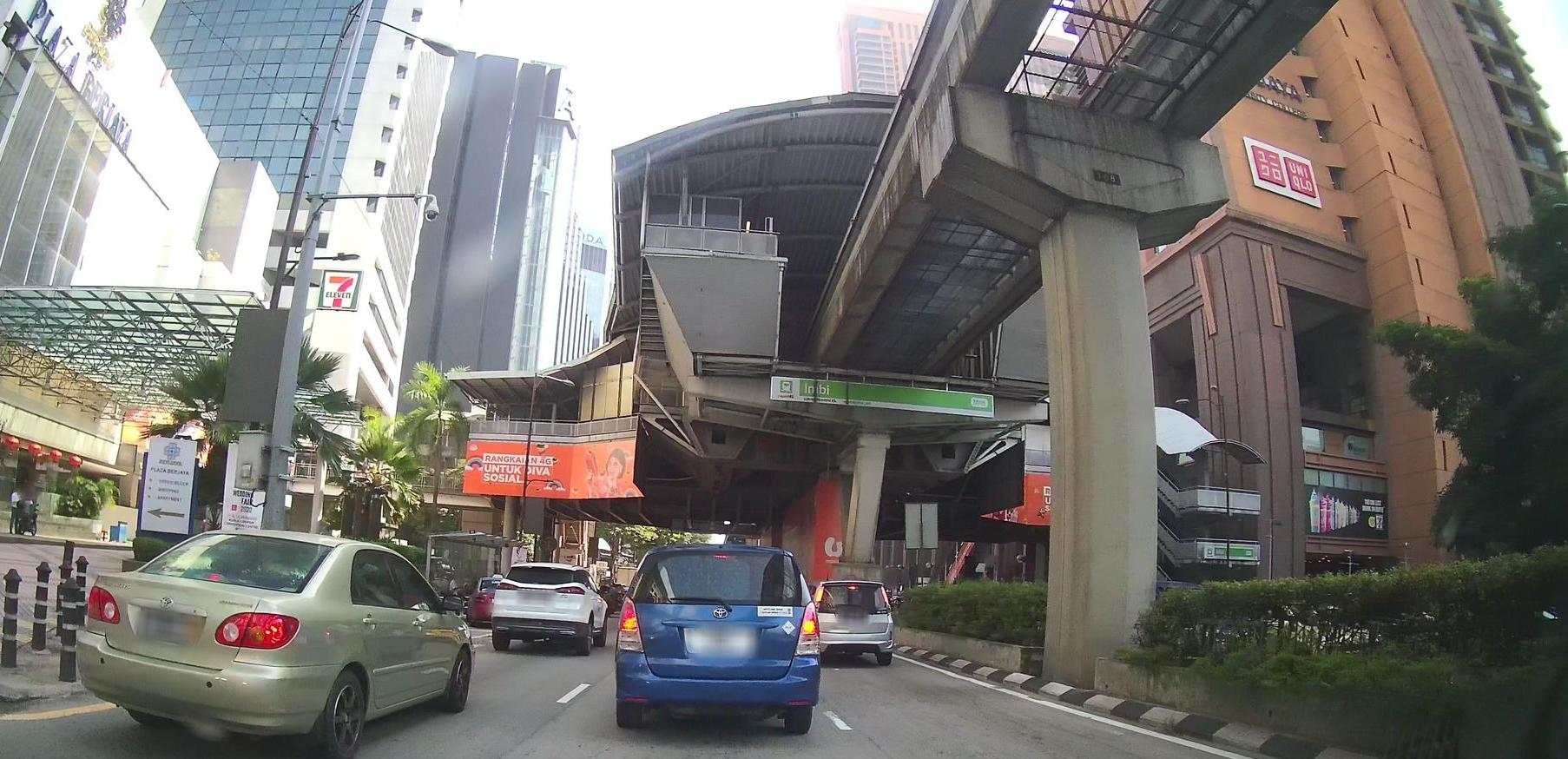

Major junctions
- Northeast end: Jalan Bukit Bintang
- Jalan Bukit Bintang; Kuala Lumpur Inner Ring Road (Jalan Sultan Ismail)
- Southwest end: Imbi

Location
- Country: Malaysia

Highway system
- Highways in Malaysia; Expressways; Federal; State

Jalan Imbi is a major road in Bukit Bintang, Kuala Lumpur, Malaysia. It is named after Sergeant Imbi bin Seedin, who had his house at the junction of Jalan Imbi and Jalan Pudu.

== Route ==
It runs in a southwest-northeast direction, from the intersection with Jalan Pudu (near the former site of Pudu Jail), through Berjaya Times Square, the Imbi Monorail station and Parkroyal hotel and terminates at the junction with Jalan Bukit Bintang, in front of the Lembaga Tabung Angkatan Tentera headquarters.

== List of junctions ==
km	Exit	Junctions	To	Remarks
		Jalan Bukit Bintang		T-junctions; From Jalan Bukit Bintang
		Jalan Inai	East; Jalan Inai	T-junctions
		Jalan Gading		
		Ritz Carlton Kuala Lumpur		
		Jalan Barat	South; Jalan Barat; Jalan Melati; Jalan Khoo Teik Ee	T-junctions
		Jalan Khoo Teik Ee		
		Jalan Walter Grenier	Northwest; Jalan Walter Grenier; Jalan Gading; Jalan Bukit Bintang; Parkroyal KL; MR5 Imbi Monorail station	T-junctions
		Imbi	Northwest; Kuala Lumpur Inner Ring Road; Jalan Sultan Ismail; Jalan Bukit Bintang; Jalan Raja Chulan; Jalan P. Ramlee; KLCC Southeast; Sultan Ismail-Kampung Pandan Link (Jalan Davis); Jalan Kampung Pandan; Jalan Tun Razak (via Cheras) (Jalan Pekeliling); Kuala Lumpur Middle Ring Road 1 Ampang; Sungai Besi; SMART Tunnel SMART Tunnel; East–West Link Expressway Petaling Jaya; East–West Link Expressway Kompleks Sukan Negara; North–South Expressway Southern Route AH2 Seremban; North–South Expressway Southern Route AH2 Melaka; North–South Expressway Southern Route AH2 Johor Bahru	Junctions
		Imbi-Jalan Hang Tuah	see also Kuala Lumpur Inner Ring Road	
