= Kuala Lumpur Middle Ring Road 1 =

Road in Malaysia

Kuala Lumpur Middle Ring Road 1

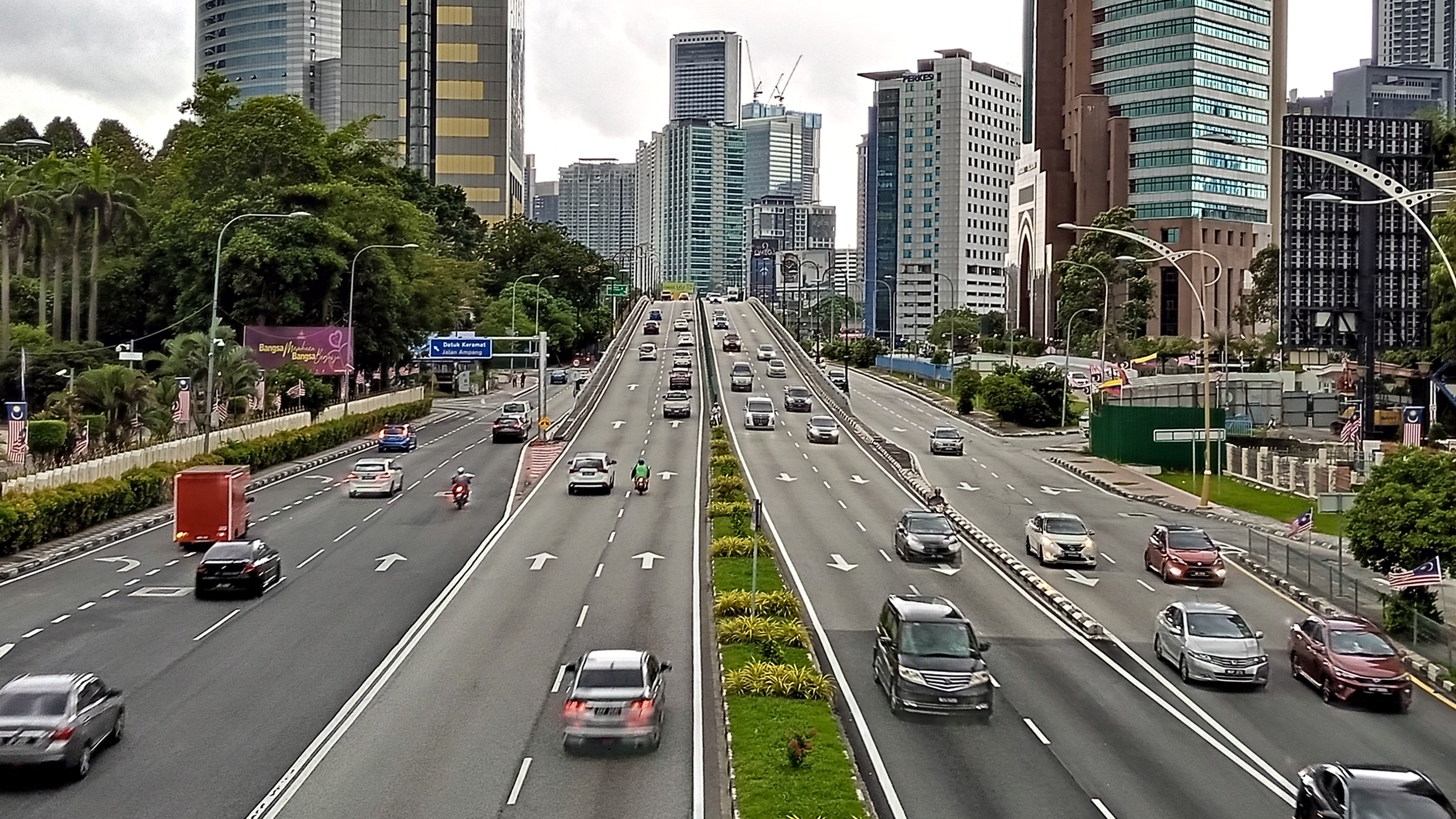

Route information
- Maintained by Malaysian Public Works Department
- Existed: 1983–present
- History: Completed in 1995

Major junctions
- Beltway around Kuala Lumpur middle city centre area
- From: Jalan Istana Interchange
- Sungai Besi Expressway; Kuala Lumpur–Seremban Expressway; FT 2 Jalan Syed Putra; Jalan Tuanku Abdul Halim; Sentul Link; FT 1 Kuala Lumpur–Rawang Highway; Jalan Sultan Azlan Shah; Duta–Ulu Klang Expressway (Tun Razak Link) / FT 2; FT 2 Genting Klang–Pahang Highway; Jalan Raja Muda Abdul Aziz; Jalan Sultan Yahya Petra (Jalan Semarak); Ampang–Kuala Lumpur Elevated Highway; B31 Jalan Ampang; KLCC Tunnel; SMART Tunnel; Sultan Ismail–Kampung Pandan Link; Maju Expressway
- To: Jalan Istana Interchange

Location
- Country: Malaysia
- Primary destinations: KLCC, Sentul, Titiwangsa

Highway system
- Highways in Malaysia; Expressways; Federal; State

Kuala Lumpur Middle Ring Road 1, Federal Route 2 or the stretch of roads including Jalan Tun Razak, Lebuhraya Sultan Iskandar (Lebuhraya Mahameru), Jalan Damansara, Jalan Istana and Jalan Lapangan Terbang is an urban and municipal main ring road in Kuala Lumpur. It is also known as Kuala Lumpur–Petaling Jaya Traffic Dispersal Scheme by the Malaysian Public Works Department (JKR). It is a busy ring road during rush hour time. This ring road is maintained by Kuala Lumpur City Hall (DBKL).

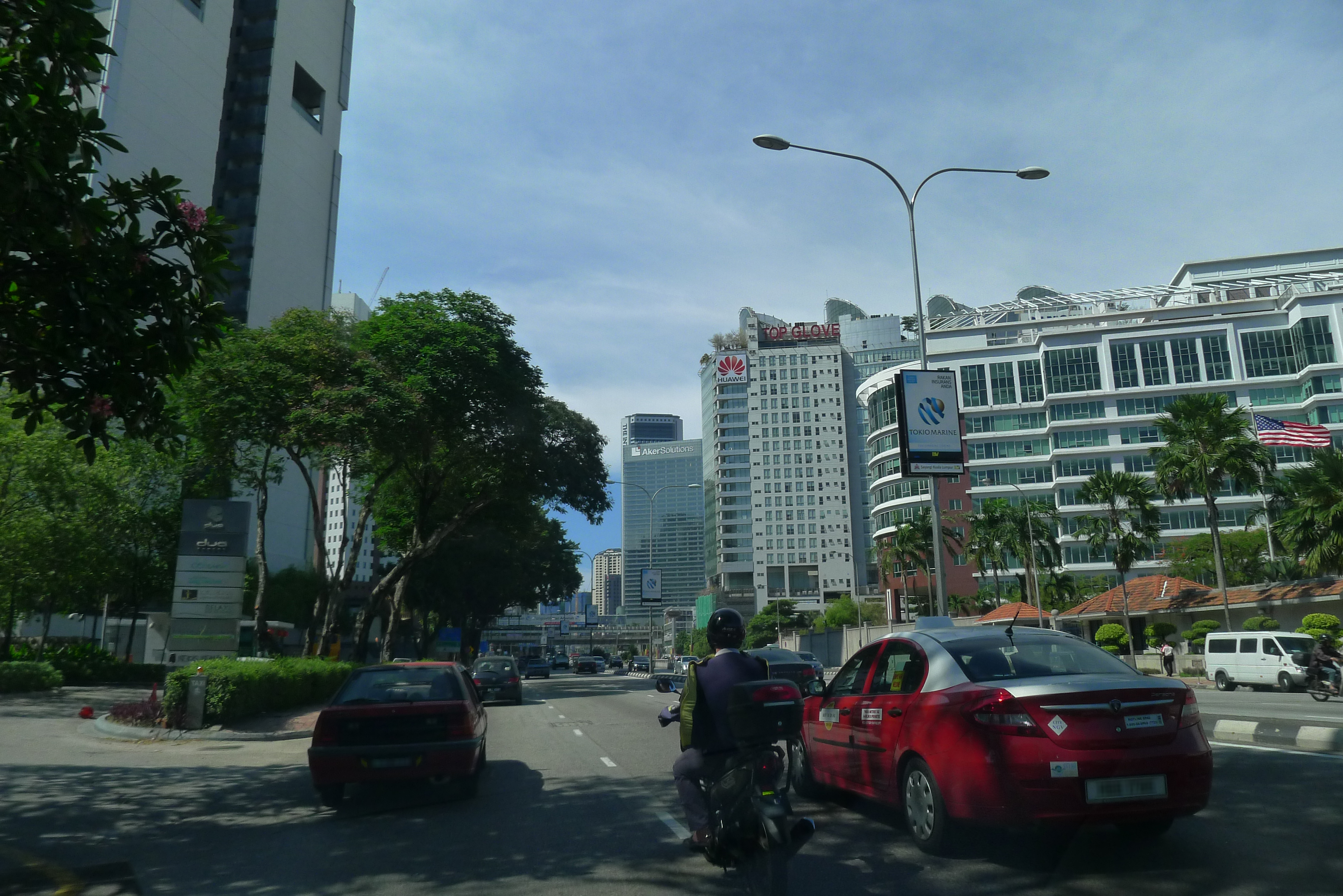
Jalan Tun Razak (formerly known as Jalan Pekeliling) in Kuala Lumpur, Malaysia, near the American Embassy. This is one of the main and most congested arterial roads in Kuala Lumpur.

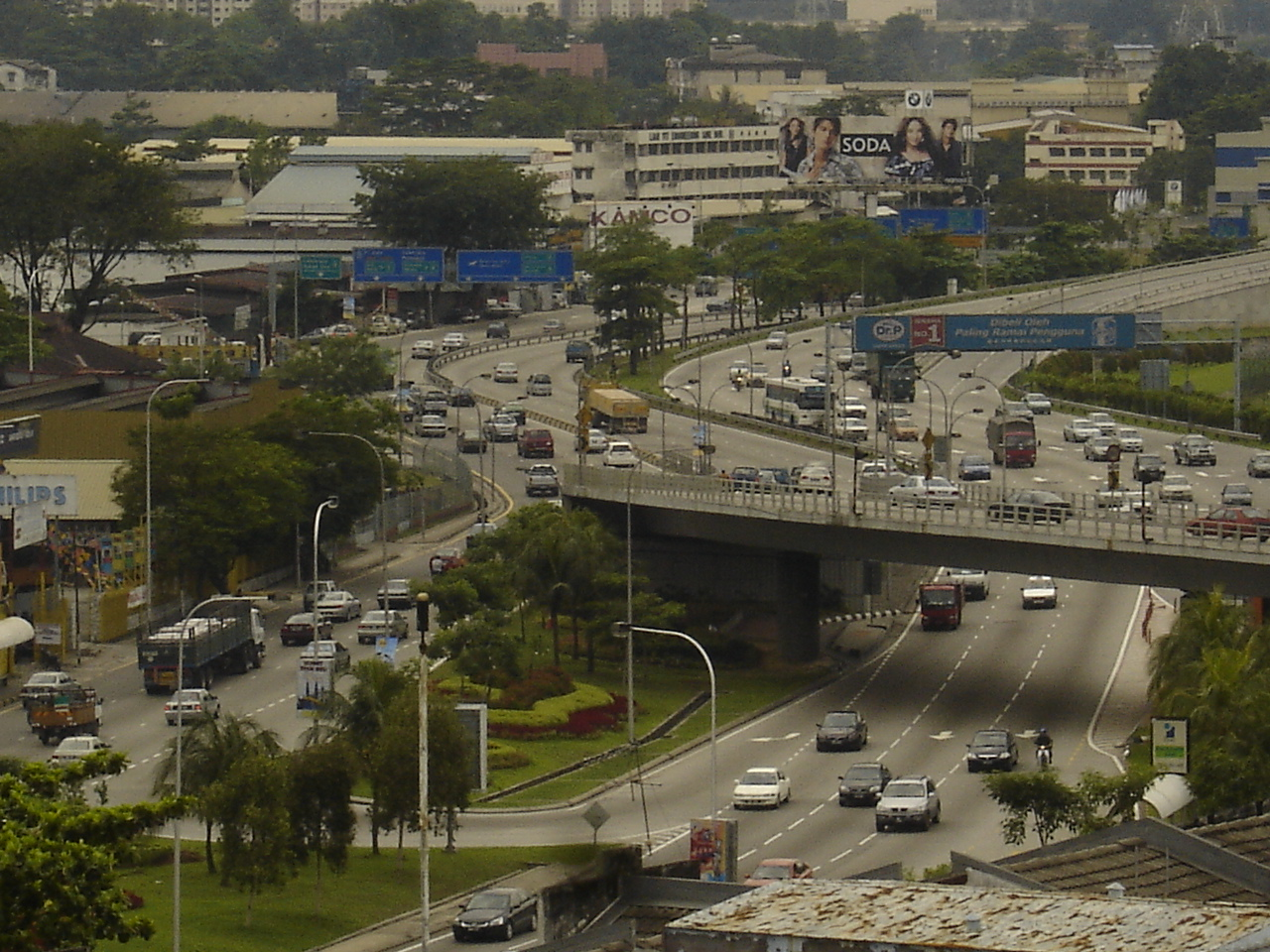
The Jalan Istana interchange on the KL–Seremban Highway in 2007, before the construction of the Sungai Besi Expressway extension and link.

== History ==
In April 1994, the mayor of Kuala Lumpur revealed plans to build a flyover on the stretch from the National Library at Jalan Tun Razak to Jalan Yap Kwan Seng, aiming to ease traffic congestion.

== Features ==
=== Overlaps ===
- FT2 Federal Route 2 (Jalan Syed Putra Interchange–Jalan Pahang Interchange)

== Interchange lists ==
The entire route is located around Kuala Lumpur middle city centre area.

Legend:

- I/C - Interchange, I/S - Intersection, RSA - Rest and service area, OBR - Overhead bridge restaurant, R/R - Restaurant and rest plaza, L/B - Layby, V/P - Vista point, TN - tunnel, T/P - Toll plaza, BR - Bridge
- C - Cloverleaf, S - Stack, T-A - Trumpet-A, T-B - Trumpet-B, DT - Directional-T/Y, SDT - Semi-Directional-T/Y, P-Y - Partial-Y, D - Diamond, P-C - Partial cloverleaf, D-D - Diverging diamond, D-R - Direct ramp

Location	km	mi	Exit	Name	Destinations	Notes
Jalan Istana (Jalan Taylor)				Jalan Istana I/C	Sungai Besi Expressway – Shamelin, Maluri, Kuantan, Ulu Klang, Ampang, Pandan Indah, Salak South, Sungai Besi; Kuala Lumpur–Seremban Expressway – Petaling Jaya, KL Sports City (Kompleks Sukan Negara), Kuala Lumpur International Airport (KLIA), Seremban, Malacca, Johor Bahru	Interchange
Jalan Istana (Jalan Taylor)				Sungai Besi Airport Exit	Jalan Lapangan Terbang Lama (Airport Road) – Sungai Besi Airport, Royal Malaysian Air Force Museum	Jalan Duta bound
Jalan Istana (Jalan Taylor)				Bukit Petaling I/C	Jalan Dewan Bahasa (Jalan Lapangan Terbang) – Jalan Wisma Putra, Dewan Bahasa dan Pustaka (DBP) headquarters, Jalan Hang Tuah (Jalan Shaw); Jalan Bukit Petaling – Bukit Petaling	Interchange
Jalan Istana (Jalan Taylor)				Istana Negara (Muzium Diraja/Royal Museum)	Istana Negara (Muzium Diraja/Royal Museum)	Jalan Duta bound
Jalan Istana (Jalan Taylor)				Istana Negara I/C	FT 2 Jalan Syed Putra (Jalan Lornie) – Jalan Kampung Attap, Jalan Maharajalela (Jalan Birch), Petaling Jaya, Shah Alam, Klang	Interchange
Jalan Istana (Jalan Taylor)				Brickfields I/C	Jalan Tun Sambanthan (Jalan Brickfields) – Brickfields	Half cloverleaf interchange Southern terminus of concurrency with FT2.
Jalan Istana (Jalan Taylor)				KL Sentral Exit	Jalan Stesen Sentral; P&R KL Sentral – Arrival/Departure, TnG TAG Hub, KTM ETS KTM Komuter 5 6 7 ( 9 (U/C))	Jalan Duta bound
Jalan Istana (Jalan Taylor)				Muzium Negara (East) I/C	Jalan Damansara – Bangsar, Mid Valley City; New Pantai Expressway – Bandar Sunway, Subang Jaya	
Jalan Istana (Jalan Taylor)				National Museum (Muzium Negara)	National Museum (Muzium Negara) – Muzium Negara MRT station ( 9 (U/C))	Jalan Duta bound
Jalan Damansara				Muzium Negara (West) I/C	Persiaran Tuanku Jaafar (Persiaran Mahameru) – Carcosa Seri Negara; Jalan Damansara – P&R KL Sentral, City Centre; Jalan Rakyat (Jalan Travers) – Bangsar, Mid Valley City; New Pantai Expressway – Bandar Sunway, Subang Jaya	Interchange
Jalan Damansara				Bukit Persekutuan Exit	Bukit Persekutuan	Jalan Duta bound
Jalan Damansara				Jalan Damansara Exit	Jalan Damansara – Galeria Sri Perdana	Jalan Duta bound
Lebuhraya Sultan Iskandar (Lebuhraya Mahameru)				Parliament I/C	Jalan Tuanku Abdul Halim (Jalan Duta) – Damansara, Ipoh, Jalan Duta, Segambut, Kuantan; Istana Negara (National Palace); Parliament House; Jalan Parlimen – City Centre, National Monument (Tugu Negaras), Perdana Lake Gardens	Expressway interchange
Lebuhraya Sultan Iskandar (Lebuhraya Mahameru)				Mahameru I/C	Bukit Tunku (Bukit Kenny), Jalan Sultan Salahuddin (Jalan Swettenham), Malaysian Public Works Department (JKR) Main Headquarters	
Lebuhraya Sultan Iskandar (Lebuhraya Mahameru)				Jalan Kuching I/C	Sentul Link – Sentul, Jalan Ipoh, Kuantan; FT 1 Kuala Lumpur–Rawang Highway – Rawang, Batu Caves, Segambut, Ipoh, Kuantan, Jalan Sultan Ismail (Jalan Treacher), City Centre	Expressway interchange
Lebuhraya Sultan Iskandar (Lebuhraya Mahameru)				PWTC I/C	Jalan Tun Ismail (Jalan Maxwell) – Hentian Putra, Putra World Trade Centre (PWTC), Sunway Putra Mall (The Mall), Jalan Chow Kit (Chow Kit Road), Jalan Tun Ismail (Maxwell Road)	Interchange
Jalan Tun Razak (Jalan Pekeliling)				Jalan Ipoh I/C	Jalan Sultan Azlan Shah (Jalan Ipoh) – Sentul, Segambut, Kuantan, Jalan Tuanku Abdul Rahman (Batu Road), Jalan Raja Muda Abdul Aziz (Princes Road)	Diamond interchange
Jalan Tun Razak (Jalan Pekeliling)				Titiwangsa station	3 4 8 12 13	
Jalan Tun Razak (Jalan Pekeliling)				Bulatan Pahang I/C	FT 2 Genting Klang–Pahang Highway (Jalan Pahang) – Setapak, Gombak, Kuantan, Jalan Tuanku Abdul Rahman (Batu Road), Jalan Chow Kit (Chow Kit Road), City Centre, Kuala Lumpur Hospital; Duta–Ulu Klang Expressway (Tun Razak Link) / FT 2 Greenwood–Sentul Pasar Link (Karak Link) – Batu Caves, Gombak, Genting Highlands, Kuantan; Duta–Sentul Pasar–Ulu Klang Link (Main Link) – Ipoh, Petaling Jaya, Segambut, Kepong	Multi-level stacked roundabout interchange Elevated directional ramp interchange Northern terminus of concurrency with FT2.
Jalan Tun Razak (Jalan Pekeliling)				Istana Budaya	Istana Budaya, Titiwangsa Lake Gardens	Ampang Park bound
Jalan Tun Razak (Jalan Pekeliling)				Kuala Lumpur Hospital	Kuala Lumpur Hospital	PWTC bound
Jalan Tun Razak (Jalan Pekeliling)				National Art Gallery	National Art Gallery, Titiwangsa Lake Gardens	Ampang Park bound
Jalan Tun Razak (Jalan Pekeliling)				National Library		
Jalan Tun Razak (Jalan Pekeliling)				Tun Razak flyover Jalan Raja Muda Abdul Aziz I/S	Jalan Raja Muda Abdul Aziz (Princes Road) – Kampung Baru, Chow Kit; Jalan Sultan Yahya Petra (Jalan Semarak/Jalan Henry Gurney) – Kampung Semarak, Royal Malaysian Police Academy (PULAPOL)	Junctions; Below flyover only
Jalan Tun Razak (Jalan Pekeliling)				Tun Razak flyover Jalan Sultan Yahya Petra I/S	Jalan Sultan Yahya Petra (Jalan Semarak/Jalan Henry Gurney) – Kampung Semarak, Royal Malaysian Police Academy (PULAPOL)	T-junctions; Below flyover only
Jalan Tun Razak (Jalan Pekeliling)				Tun Razak flyover Jalan Tun Razak-AKLEH I/C	Ampang–Kuala Lumpur Elevated Highway – City Centre, Jalan Sultan Ismail (Jalan Treacher), KLCC, Ulu Klang, Ampang	Expressway interchange
Jalan Tun Razak (Jalan Pekeliling)				Tun Razak flyover Jalan Yap Kwan Seng I/S	Jalan Yap Kwan Seng (Yap Kwan Seng Road)	Directional T interchange
Jalan Tun Razak (Jalan Pekeliling)				Empire Tower	Embassy of Hungary	
Jalan Tun Razak (Jalan Pekeliling)				Jalan Ampang I/C	B31 Jalan Ampang – City Centre, KLCC, 5 12 Ampang Park LRT/MRT station, Setiawangsa, Ulu Klang, Ampang	Tunnel diamond interchange
Jalan Tun Razak (Jalan Pekeliling)				Tabung Haji Tower (Menara Tabung Haji)		
Jalan Tun Razak (Jalan Pekeliling)				PNB Tower(Menara PNB)	Pemodalan Nasional Berhad	
Jalan Tun Razak (Jalan Pekeliling)				Wisma Tan & Tan	Wisma Tan & Tan – Embassy of the Federal Republic of Germany, High Commission of the Brunei Darussalam, (Canada) Canadian High Commission	
Jalan Tun Razak (Jalan Pekeliling)				KLCC Tunnel I/C	KLCC Tunnel (Lorong Kuda) – Persiaran KLCC, KLCC	Tunnel directional T interchange Max height: 2.1 m Pudu bound
Jalan Tun Razak (Jalan Pekeliling)				Lorong Kuda Exit	Lorong Kuda – Persiaran KLCC; KLCC Tunnel (Lorong Kuda) – KLCC	PWTC bound
Jalan Tun Razak (Jalan Pekeliling)				High Commission of the Republic of Singapore		
Jalan Tun Razak (Jalan Pekeliling)				Embassy of the United States of America		
Jalan Tun Razak (Jalan Pekeliling)				Taman U-Thant	Jalan U Thant – Taman U-Thant	Pudu bound
Jalan Tun Razak (Jalan Pekeliling)				Embassy of the Republic of Iraq		
Jalan Tun Razak (Jalan Pekeliling)				Embassy of Japan		
Jalan Tun Razak (Jalan Pekeliling)				Istana Terengganu		
Jalan Tun Razak (Jalan Pekeliling)				Jalan Kia Peng	Jalan Kia Peng	PWTC bound
Jalan Tun Razak (Jalan Pekeliling)				Jalan Langgak Golf	Jalan Langgak Golf (Golf View Road)	Pudu bound
Jalan Tun Razak (Jalan Pekeliling)				(Singapore) Rumah Temasek		
Jalan Tun Razak (Jalan Pekeliling)				RSCC–Bukit Bintang I/C	Jalan Bukit Bintang – Bukit Bintang, Imbi, Royal Selangor Country Club (RSCC)	Tunnel diamond interchange
Jalan Tun Razak (Jalan Pekeliling)				Embassy of the State of Kuwait		
Jalan Tun Razak (Jalan Pekeliling)				Embassy of the Republic of Indonesia		
Jalan Tun Razak (Jalan Pekeliling)				SMART Tunnel	SMART Tunnel – Petaling Jaya, KL Sports City (Kompleks Sukan Negara), Kuala Lumpur International Airport (KLIA), Seremban, Malacca, Johor Bahru	From/to KLCC only, Light vehicles only, Maximum height limit 2 m, Speed limit 60 km/h
Jalan Yew; Yew Flyover				Bulatan Kampung Pandan I/C	Sultan Ismail–Kampung Pandan Link – Kampung Pandan, Pudu, Jalan Chan Sow Lin, Malaysian Public Works Department (JKR) Federal Workshop, Jalan Davis	Multi-level stacked roundabout interchange
Jalan Yew; Yew Flyover				Kampung Pandan–MEX I/C	Maju Expressway – Putrajaya, Kuala Lumpur International Airport (KLIA)	From/to KLCC only
Jalan Yew; Yew Flyover				Bulatan Pudu I/C	Below Flyover – Jalan Yew, Jalan Pudu, Jalan Cheras, Jalan Chan Sow Lin, Malaysian Public Works Department (JKR) Federal Workshop	Multi-level stacked roundabout interchange
Jalan Sungai Besi				Bulatan Loke Yew I/C	Jalan Sungai Besi; FT 1 Cheras Highway – City Centre, Jalan Maharajalela (Jalan Birch), Bulatan Edinburgh, Cheras, Seremban	Multi-level stacked roundabout expressway interchange
Jalan Sungai Besi				Jalan Istana I/C	Sungai Besi Expressway – Shamelin, Maluri, Kuantan, Ulu Klang, Ampang, Pandan Indah, Salak South, Sungai Besi; Kuala Lumpur–Seremban Expressway – Petaling Jaya, KL Sports City (Kompleks Sukan Negara), Kuala Lumpur International Airport (KLIA), Seremban, Malacca, Johor Bahru	Interchange
1.000 mi = 1.609 km; 1.000 km = 0.621 mi: Incomplete access

== See also ==
- Kuala Lumpur Inner Ring Road
- Kuala Lumpur Middle Ring Road 2
- Jalan Tuanku Abdul Halim
