= Jalan Raja Muda Abdul Aziz =

Road in Malaysia

- Princes Road
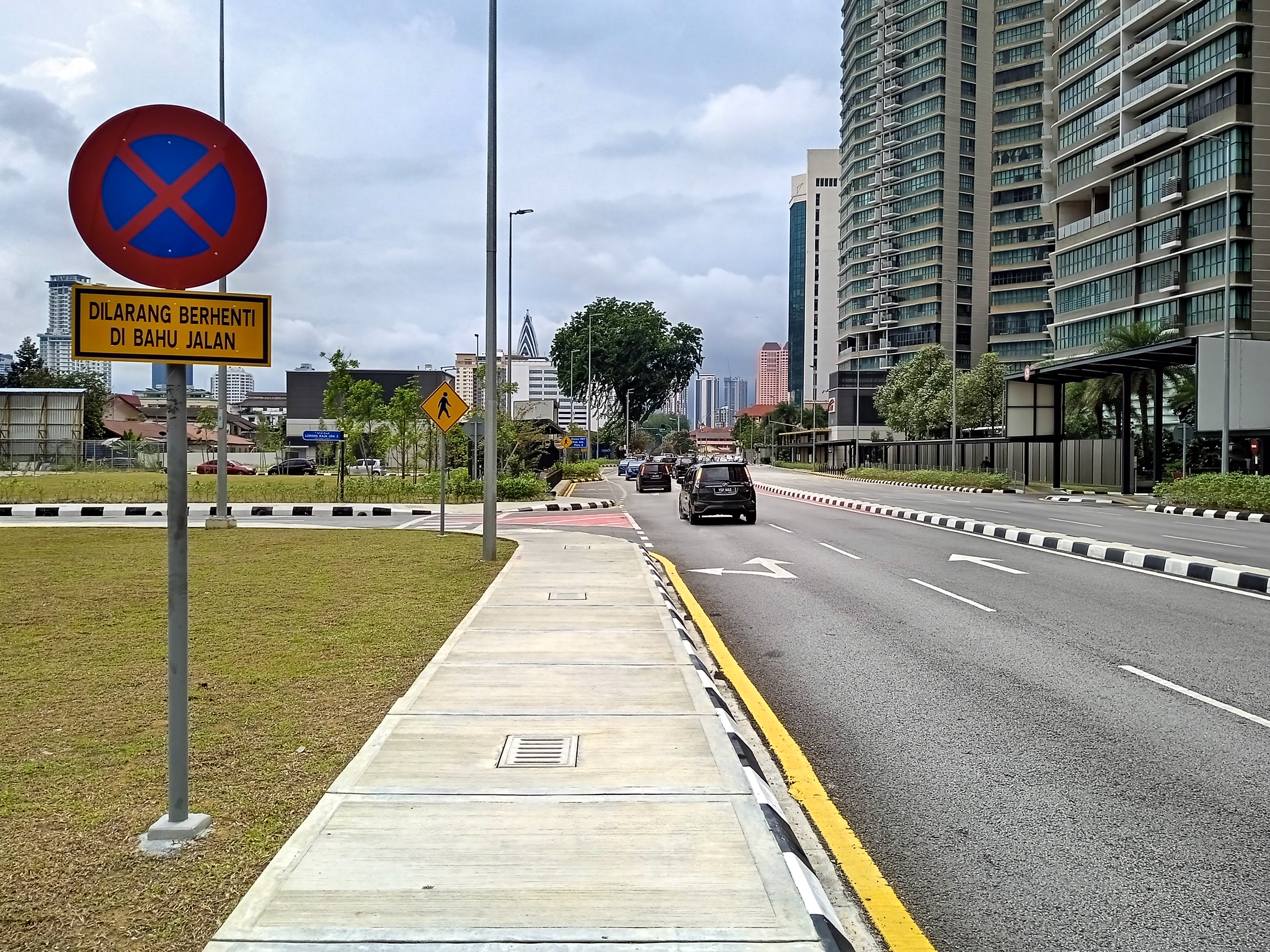

Major junctions
- West end: Chow Kit
- FT 2 Genting Klang-Pahang Highway; Jalan Ipoh; Jalan Tuanku Abdul Rahman; Jalan Doktor Latif; Jalan Raja Abdullah; Kuala Lumpur Middle Ring Road 1 Jalan Sultan Yahya Petra (Jalan Semarak)
- East end: Jalan Semarak

Location
- Country: Malaysia
- Primary destinations: Hospital Kuala Lumpur; Kampung Baru

Highway system
- Highways in Malaysia; Expressways; Federal; State

Jalan Raja Muda Abdul Aziz (formerly Princes Road) is a major road in Kuala Lumpur, Malaysia. It was built in 1990 and named after Tengku Abdul Aziz Shah (Sultan Salahuddin Abdul Aziz Shah), a former Raja Muda of Selangor.

== List of junctions ==
km	Exit	Junctions	To	Remarks
		Chow Kit	North; FT 2 Genting Klang-Pahang Highway; Jalan Pahang; Jalan Tun Razak (KLMRR 1); Setapak; Kuantan South; Jalan Tuanku Abdul Rahman (Batu Road); Jalan Sultan Ismail (IRR); Jalan Dang Wangi; Dataran Merdeka	Junctions
Jalan Raja Muda Abdul Aziz
		Kampung Baru	North; Jalan Doktor Latif; Hospital Kuala Lumpur South; Jalan Raja Abdullah (Jalan Hale); Kampung Baru; Jalan Sultan Ismail (IRR); Jalan Ampang	Junctions
		Lorong Raja Muda	North; Lorong Raja Muda; Hospital Kuala Lumpur	T-junctions
		Jalan Raja Muda food court		
		Sekolah Kebangsaan Jalan Raja Muda		
		KLMRR1	Kuala Lumpur Middle Ring Road 1 Northwest; Sentul; Setapak; Ipoh; Kuantan; Southeast; Jalan Ampang; KLCC; Sungai Besi; Cheras; Seremban; Petaling Jaya	Junctions below flover
Jalan Raja Muda Abdul Aziz
Jalan Sultan Yahya Petra
		Jalan Sultan Yahya Petra	Jalan Sultan Yahya Petra (Jalan Semarak/Jalan Henry Gurney); Northeast; Royal Malaysian Police Academy (PULAPOL); Duta–Ulu Klang Expressway Batu Caves; Duta–Ulu Klang Expressway Setiawangsa	T-junctions
