= Royal Malaysian Police College Kuala Lumpur =

Coordinates: 3.0768075°N 101.7523306°E

Location
- Royal Malaysian Police College Kuala Lumpur, 43200 Cheras, Selangor; Cheras, Selangor; Malaysia

Information
- Type: Police Training
- Motto: Ilmu Asas Khidmat (Basic Service Knowledge)
- Established: 31 January 1999; 27 years ago
- Commandant: DCP Dato' Pahlawan Anuar bin Othman

The Royal Malaysian Police College Kuala Lumpur (Malay: Maktab Polis Diraja Malaysia Kuala Lumpur) is a police educational institution located in Hulu Langat District, Selangor, Malaysia. It is responsible for training senior officers in the Royal Malaysia Police and the Malaysian Armed Forces. The college also trains police officers and soldiers from Singapore, Brunei, Thailand, Russia, the United Kingdom and the United States.

== History ==
The idea for a Senior Officers College was first proposed by the then Inspector General of Police, Tan Sri (later Tun) Mohammed Hanif Omar in 1990, after a conducting a study on the need to improve the conditions of training institutions. The college's grounds were broken on 7 January 1994 at the Police Field Force Central Brigade, Cheras, opposite the previous Police College. The physical construction of the college began on 16 January 1996, and the institution began operating in part on 31 January 1999.

The Senior Officers' College executes the function of four previous training institutions namely:

- Police College, Kuala Kubu Bahru, Selangor
- Criminal Investigation College, KL
- Special Branch Training School, KL
- Traffic Training School, Cheras, KL

The college was officially opened on 10 July 2004 by Dato' Seri Abdullah Ahmad Badawi, the former Prime Minister and Minister of Internal Security.

== College organisations ==
The college is headed by a commandant with the rank of Deputy Commissioner of Police (DCP) who is responsible for three centres of training, two centres of training support and two administrative divisions as below:

- Centre for Management Science
- Centre for Investigation & Prosecution
- Centre for Intelligence Science & Strategic Studies
- Centre for Research and Curriculum Development
- Centre for Morale Building
- Management Division
- Camp Commandant Division

Since opening, several new units have been added to institution, including the Centre for Disaster & Crisis Management which is headed by an Assistant Commissioner of Police (ACP); and the Diploma in Investigative Studies Unit, to be headed by an Assistant Commissioner of Police (ACP). The college is also tasked with training newly recruited officers, so the Basic Policing Training Program Unit was formed. This unit is headed by an officer with the rank of Deputy Superintendent of Police (DSP).

== Past Commandants ==
- SAC Yahaya Udin (1999)
- SAC Acryl Sani Abdullah Sani (2004)
- DCP Dato' Yong Lei Choo (?–2019)
- DCP Dato' Tan Chong Jin (1 November 2019 – 22 July 2022)
- DCP Ahmad Dzaffir bin Yussof (15 August 2022 – 19 September 2022)
- DCP Dato' Pahlawan Anuar bin Othman (24 September 2022–present)

== See also ==
- PULAPOL
