= Jalan Kinabalu Flyover =

Jalan Kinabalu Flyover Jejambat Jalan Kinabalu
- Carries: Motor vehicles
- Crosses: Klang River
- Locale: Jalan Kinabalu; Kuala Lumpur Inner Ring Road
- Official name: Jalan Kinabalu Flyover
- Maintained by: Kuala Lumpur City Hall (DBKL)

Characteristics
- Design: double box girder bridge
- Total length: 1.1 km
- Width: --
- Longest span: --

History
- Designer: Government of Malaysia; Malaysian Public Works Department (JKR)
- Constructed by: Malaysian Public Works Department (JKR)
- Opened: 1965

Jalan Kinabalu Flyover or Kinabalu Flyover is a flyover in Kuala Lumpur, Malaysia and was the first flyover built in the country after independence on 1957. Construction began in 1963 and was completed in 1965. The flyover was opened to traffic in August 1965 and is part of the Kuala Lumpur Inner Ring Road system.
