= Kuala Lumpur Inner Ring Road =

Road in Malaysia

Kuala Lumpur Inner Ring Road

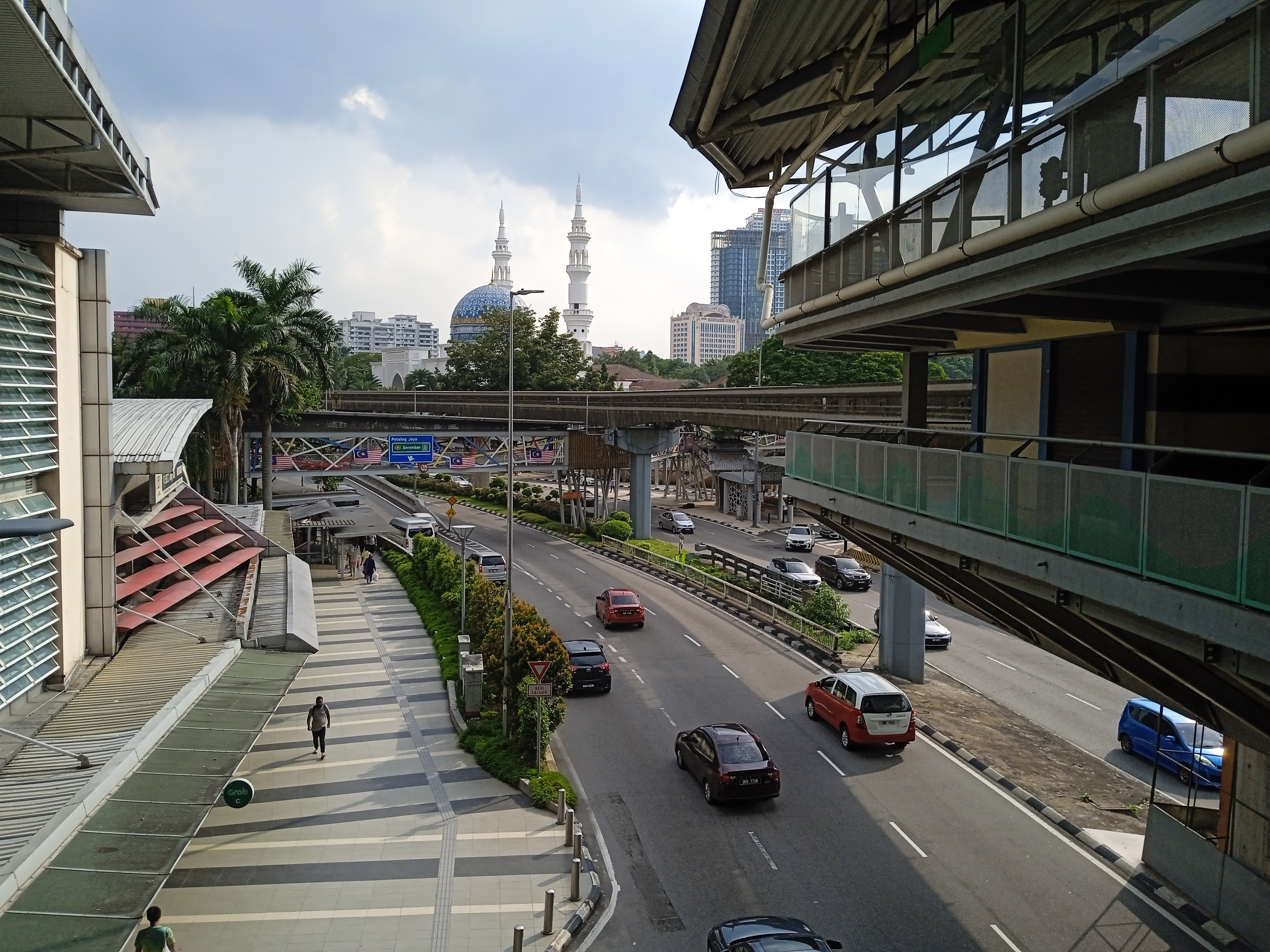

Route information
- Maintained by Malaysian Public Works Department (JKR); Kuala Lumpur City Hall (DBKL)

Major junctions
- Beltway around Kuala Lumpur inner city centre area
- From: Bulatan Edinburgh roundabout
- FT 1 Cheras Highway; Jalan Dewan Bahasa; Jalan Sultan Sulaiman; FT 2 Jalan Syed Putra; Jalan Sultan Hishamuddin; Jalan Parlimen; FT 1 Kuala Lumpur–Rawang Highway; Jalan Raja Laut; Jalan Tuanku Abdul Rahman; Jalan Raja Abdullah; Ampang–Kuala Lumpur Elevated Highway; Jalan Ampang; Jalan P. Ramlee; Jalan Raja Chulan; Jalan Bukit Bintang; Jalan Imbi; Sultan Ismail–Kampung Pandan Link; Jalan Pudu
- To: Bulatan Edinburgh roundabout

Location
- Country: Malaysia
- Primary destinations: Kampung Baru, KLCC, Bukit Bintang, Pudu

Highway system
- Highways in Malaysia; Expressways; Federal; State

Kuala Lumpur Inner Ring Road is an urban and municipal ring road system of Kuala Lumpur consisting of Jalan Sultan Ismail (Jalan Treacher), Jalan Imbi, Jalan Shaw and Federal Route 1 (Jalan Kuching, Jalan Sultan Hisamuddin (Victory Avenue), Jalan Kinabalu and Jalan Maharajalela (Jalan Birch)). Kuala Lumpur's district of shopping complexes, the Golden Triangle, is located within the ring road.

== Features ==
- Jalan Kinabalu Flyover was the first flyover in Malaysia built since independence. It was opened in August 1965.
- Overhead monorail track along Jalan Sultan Ismail, Jalan Imbi and Jalan Hang Tuah.

== Developments ==
=== Edinburgh flyover ===
Construction began in late 2007 and was completed in the end of 2009. The project is led by the Kuala Lumpur City Hall (Dewan Bandaraya Kuala Lumpur (DBKL)).

=== Jalan Pudu-Hang Tuah intersections ===
The 114-year-old Pudu Prison's wall between Jalan Pudu and Jalan Hang Tuah was demolished on 21 June 2010 by the Kuala Lumpur City Hall (DBKL) to make way for a road expansion and tunnel project on Jalan Pudu. On 20 January 2022 it got replaced to Bukit Bintang City Centre.

=== Section between Raja Chulan and Imbi ===
The section of the Inner Ring Road between Raja Chulan and Imbi intersections was changed to one-way road in 2007 because of the opening of the SMART Tunnel and the Sultan Ismail–Kampung Pandan Link. As a result, motorists travelling in clockwise direction are diverted to Jalan Raja Chulan and Jalan Imbi. However, the road divider along the section remained intact to retain the support of the overhead KL Monorail tracks. As a result, motorists travelling at the wrong side of the road may tend to cross illegally to the other carriageway, exposing them to risks of accidents.

On 1 May 2024, the section of the Inner Ring Road between Raja Chulan and Imbi intersections changed back to bi-directions. However on 22 July 2024, that section changed again to single direction from Imbi intersections to Raja Chulan.

== Junction lists ==
The entire route is located in Federal Territory of Kuala Lumpur.

Legend:

- I/C - Interchange, I/S - Intersection, RSA - Rest and service area, OBR - Overhead bridge restaurant, R/R - Restaurant and rest plaza, L/B - Layby, V/P - Vista point, TN - tunnel, T/P - Toll plaza, BR - Bridge
- C - Cloverleaf, S - Stack, T-A - Trumpet-A, T-B - Trumpet-B, DT - Directional-T/Y, SDT - Semi-Directional-T/Y, P-Y - Partial-Y, D - Diamond, P-C - Partial cloverleaf, D-D - Diverging diamond, D-R - Direct ramp

Route	km	Exit	Name	Destinations	Notes
Through to FT 1 Cheras Highway
FT1 Jalan Cheras			Edinburgh Roundabout	Jalan Dewan Bahasa (Jalan Lapangan Terbang) – Istana Negara (Royal Museum), KL Sentral, Bangsar; Sungai Besi Expressway – Sungai Besi; East–West Link Expressway – Kompleks Sukan Negara; North–South Expressway Southern Route / AH2 – Kuala Lumpur International Airport, Seremban, Malacca, Johor Bahru; North–South Expressway Northern Route / AH2 – Ipoh; FT 2 Federal Highway – Petaling Jaya, Shah Alam, Klang	Tunnel diamond interchange with flyover
FT1 Jalan Maharajarela (Jalan Birch)			Maharajalela station	KL Monorail	
FT1 Jalan Kinabalu Flyover			Bulatan Merdeka	Jalan Stadium – Stadium Merdeka, Stadium Negara, Victoria Institution; Jalan Sultan Sulaiman (Sulaiman Road) – Petaling Jaya, Shah Alam, Klang	Roundabout
FT1 Jalan Kinabalu Flyover			Jalan Kinabalu Flyover; Bulatan Kinabalu	Jalan Sultan Mohammed – Jalan Hang Kasturi (Jalan Rodger), Jalan Cheng Lock (Foch Avenue), Central Market; FT 2 Jalan Syed Putra (Jalan Lornie) – Petaling Jaya, Shah Alam, Klang	Roundabout interchange
FT1 Jalan Kinabalu Flyover		BR	Jalan Kinabalu Flyover; Sungai Klang bridge		
FT1 Jalan Sultan Hisamuddin/Jalan Kinabalu			Jalan Kinabalu Flyover; Bulatan Tugu; Kuala Lumpur railway station	Jalan Perdana (Jalan Venning) – Masjid Negara, Makam Pahlawan, Islamic Arts Museum Malaysia, Muzium Polis, Pusat Islam Malaysia, Tun Abdul Razak Memorial, Planetarium Negara, Perdana Lake Gardens, Kuala Lumpur Bird Park, Taman Bunga Raya; Jalan Tugu – Dayabumi, Kuala Lumpur General Post Office, Bukit Aman Police Headquarters; Jalan Sultan Hisamuddin (Victory Avenue) – Kuala Lumpur railway station, KL Sentral, Bangsar, Petaling Jaya, Shah Alam, Klang	Roundabout interchange
FT1 Jalan Sultan Hisamuddin/Jalan Kinabalu			Jalan Cenderasari (Jalan Hospital)	Jalan Cenderasari (Jalan Hospital) – Bukit Aman Police Headquarters, Perdana Lake Gardens	
FT1 Jalan Kinabalu			Dayabumi	Jalan Sultan Hisamuddin (Victory Avenue) – Dayabumi, Dataran Merdeka, Sultan Abdul Samad Building, Jalan Raja Laut (Jalan --), Lebuh Pasar Besar (Market Street), Medan Pasar Besar (Old Market Square)	
FT1 Jalan Kinabalu			Jalan Tangsi (Jalan Barracks)	Jalan Tangsi (Jalan Barracks); Bank Rakyat building	
FT1 Jalan Kinabalu			Dato' Onn Roundabout	Jalan Parlimen (Club Road) – Malaysian Houses of Parliament, Perdana Lake Gardens, Tugu Negara, Jalan Duta, Damansara, Jalan Raja Laut (Jalan --), Dataran Merdeka, Sultan Abdul Samad Building, Jalan Tun Perak (Jalan Mountbatten), Jalan Pudu; Jalan Sultan Salahuddin (Jalan Swettenham) – Bank Negara Malaysia, BNM Currency Museum, Malaysian Public Works Department (JKR) main headquarters, Memorial Tunku Abdul Rahman, Open University Malaysia (OUM), Dataran Merdeka, Sultan Abdul Samad Building, Selangor Club, St Mary's Church, Kuala Lumpur City Library	Roundabout interchange
FT1 Jalan Kuching			Jalan Dato' Onn ramp	Jalan Dato' Onn (Residency Road) – Tunku Abdul Rahman Memorial, Open University Malaysia (OUM)	Ramp off
FT1 Jalan Kuching			Jalan Sultan Ismail (Jalan Treacher)	FT 1 Kuala Lumpur–Rawang Highway – Ipoh, Segambut, Kepong, Kuantan	Directional-T interchange, straight direction return to original FT1
Jalan Sultan Ismail (Jalan Treacher)		BR	Sungai Gombak bridge		
Jalan Sultan Ismail (Jalan Treacher)			Jalan Raja Laut	Jalan Raja Laut – Jalan Chow Kit (Chow Kit Road), Putra World Trade Centre (PWTC), Jalan Ipoh, Sentul, Jalan Pahang	Junctions, northbound only
Jalan Sultan Ismail (Jalan Treacher)			Jalan Tuanku Abdul Rahman	Jalan Tuanku Abdul Rahman (Batu Road) – Jalan Dang Wangi (Jalan Campbell), Jalan Tun Perak (Jalan Mountbatten), Dataran Merdeka, Sultan Abdul Samad Building	Junctions, southbound only
Jalan Sultan Ismail (Jalan Treacher)			Medan Tuanku Monorail station	KL Monorail	
Jalan Sultan Ismail (Jalan Treacher)			Jalan Raja Abdullah	Jalan Raja Abdullah (Jalan Hale) – Kampung Baru, Jalan Raja Alang (Jalan Hans), Jalan Raja Muda Abdul Aziz (Jalan Raja Muda), Kuala Lumpur General Hospital, Jalan Dang Wangi (Jalan Campbell); Ampang–Kuala Lumpur Elevated Highway – KLCC, Ampang, Ulu Klang	Junctions
Jalan Sultan Ismail (Jalan Treacher)			Jalan Sultan Ismail-AKLEH	Ampang–Kuala Lumpur Elevated Highway – KLCC, Ampang, Ulu Klang	Ramp on/off to/from expressway
Jalan Sultan Ismail (Jalan Treacher)		BR	Sungai Klang bridge		
Jalan Sultan Ismail (Jalan Treacher)			Jalan Ampang	Jalan Ampang – Jalan Tun Perak (Jalan Mountbatten), Jalan Dang Wangi (Jalan Campbell), KLCC, Petronas Twin Towers, Tourist Information Centre, Jalan Yap Kwan Seng (Jalan --), Jalan Tun Razak (MRR1) (Jalan Pekeliling)	Junctions
Jalan Sultan Ismail (Jalan Treacher)			Bukit Nanas station	KL Monorail; Kelana Jaya Line	
Jalan Sultan Ismail (Jalan Treacher)			Jalan P. Ramlee	Jalan P. Ramlee (Jalan Parry) – KL Tower, Jalan Raja Chulan (Jalan Weld), Exchange Square, KLCC, Petronas Twin Towers, Jalan Pinang, Jalan Yap Kwan Seng, Jalan Tun Razak (MRR1) (Jalan Pekeliling)	Junctions
Jalan Sultan Ismail (Jalan Treacher)			Raja Chulan station	KL Monorail	
Jalan Sultan Ismail (Jalan Treacher)			Jalan Raja Chulan	Jalan Raja Chulan (Jalan Weld) – Jalan Tun Perak (Jalan Mountbatten), Exchange Square, Jalan P. Ramlee (Jalan Parry), KL Tower, Kuala Lumpur Middle Ring Road 1(Jalan Tun Razak, Jalan Pekeliling)	Junctions
Jalan Sultan Ismail (Jalan Treacher)			Jalan Beringin	Jalan Beringin – Ain Arabia	One-way street
Jalan Sultan Ismail (Jalan Treacher)			Bukit Bintang	Jalan Bukit Bintang – Jalan Pudu, Jalan Cheng Lock (Foch Avenue), Jalan Tun Perak (Jalan Mountbatten)	Junctions, to southwest only
Jalan Sultan Ismail (Jalan Treacher)			Bukit Bintang Monorail station	KL Monorail	
Jalan Sultan Ismail/Jalan Imbi			Imbi	Sultan Ismail–Kampung Pandan Link (Jalan Davis) – Jalan Kampung Pandan, Jalan Tun Razak (via Cheras) (Jalan Pekeliling); Kuala Lumpur Middle Ring Road 1 – Ampang, Sungai Besi; SMART Tunnel – Petaling Jaya, Kompleks Sukan Negara, Kuala Lumpur International Airport, Seremban, Malacca, Johor Bahru	Junctions
Jalan Imbi			Imbi station Berjaya Times Square	KL Monorail, Berjaya Times Square	
Jalan Imbi/Hang Tuan			Jalan Pudu	Jalan Pudu – Jalan Tun Perak (Jalan Mountbatten), Jalan Cheng Lock, Pudu, Cheras	Junctions; Tunnel intersections
Jalan Hang Tuah			Bukit Bintang City Centre (formerly Pudu Prison)		
Jalan Hang Tuah			Kuala Lumpur Police Headquarters		
Jalan Hang Tuah			Railway crossing bridge Hang Tuah station	KL Monorail, Ampang and Sri Petaling lines	
Jalan Hang Tuah			Jalan Hang Jebat	Jalan Hang Jebat (Jalan Davidson) – Victoria Institution, Stadium Merdeka, Stadium Negara	T-junctions
Jalan Hang Tuah			Edinburgh flyover	Jalan Dewan Bahasa (Jalan Lapangan Terbang) – Istana Negara (Royal Museum), KL Sentral, Bangsar; Sungai Besi Expressway – Sungai Besi; East–West Link Expressway – Kompleks Sukan Negara; North–South Expressway Southern Route / AH2 – Kuala Lumpur International Airport, Seremban, Malacca, Johor Bahru; North–South Expressway Northern Route / AH2 – Ipoh; FT 2 Federal Highway – Petaling Jaya, Shah Alam, Klang	From north only
Jalan Hang Tuah			Edinburgh flyover Yayasan Al-Bukhari Mosque		
Jalan Hang Tuah			Edinburgh flyover Jalan Kenanga	Jalan Kenanga – Hang Tuah flats	
Jalan Hang Tuah			Edinburgh flyover Hang Tuah fire stations		
Jalan Hang Tuah			Edinburgh flyover Edinburgh Roundabout	FT 1 Cheras Highway – Cheras, Kajang, Seremban	Tunnel diamond interchange with flyover
Through to Jalan Dewan Bahasa (Jalan Lapangan Terbang)/Jalan Bukit Petaling

== Gallery ==
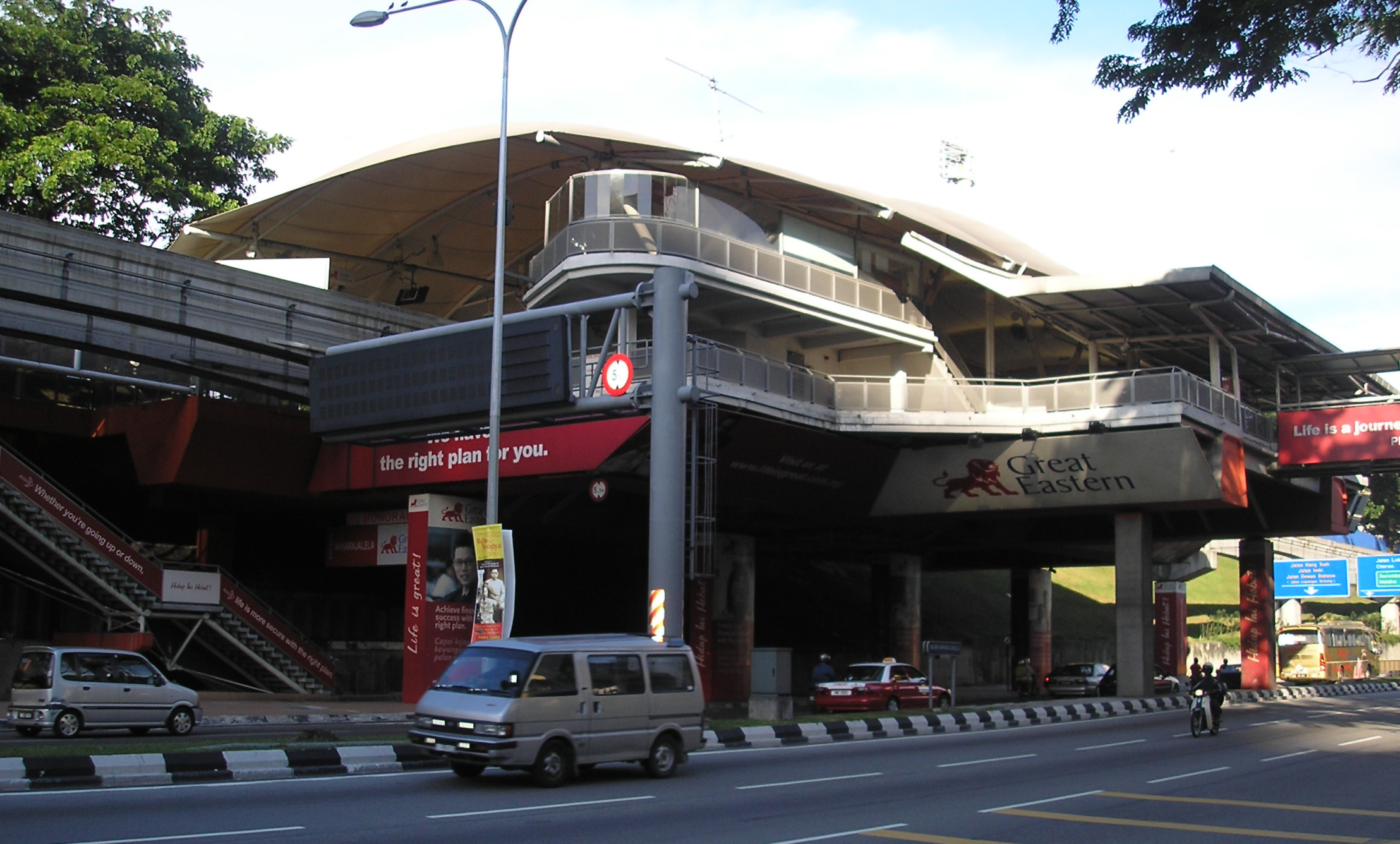
Maharajalela station

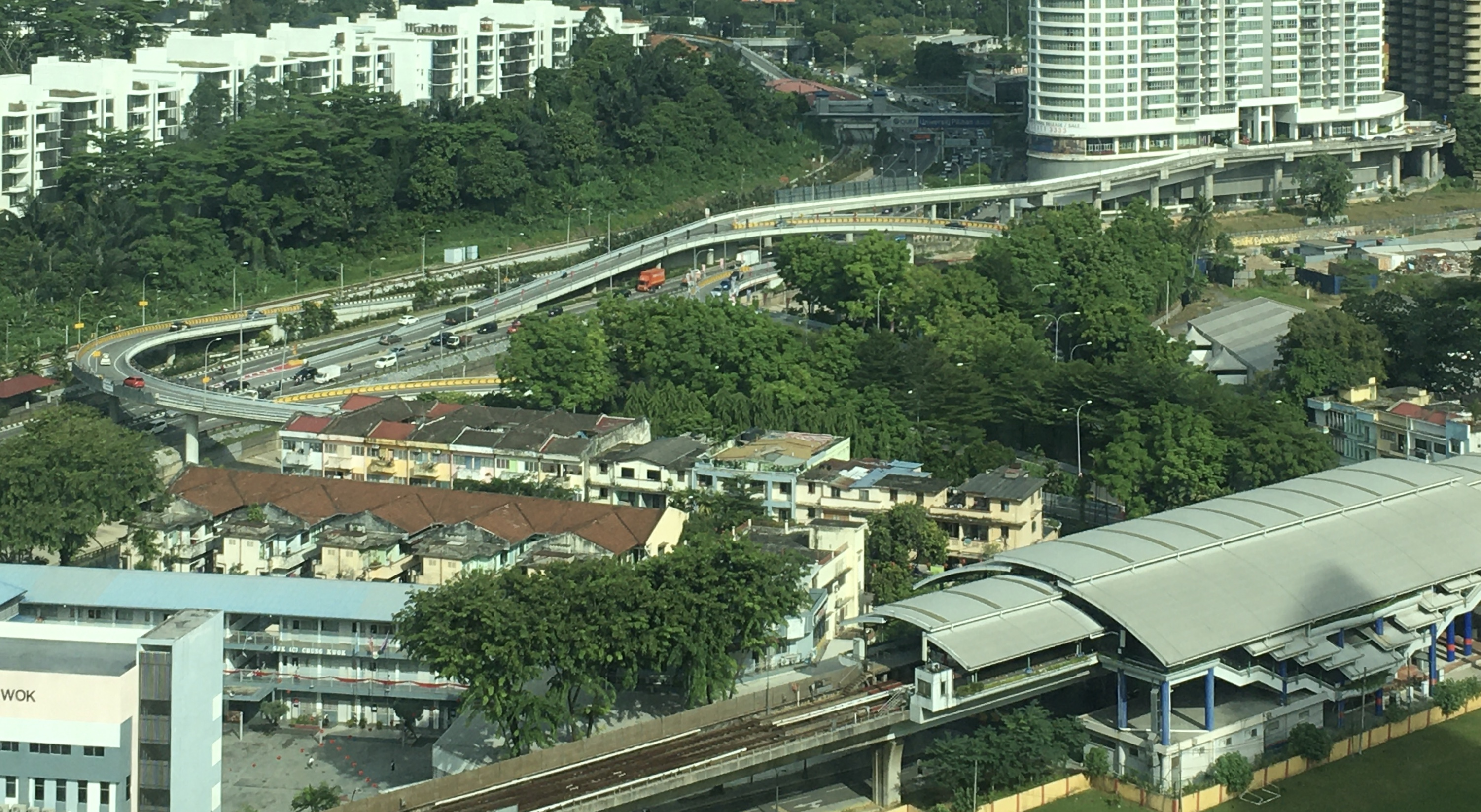
Jalan Sultan Ismail (Jalan Treacher) Interchange

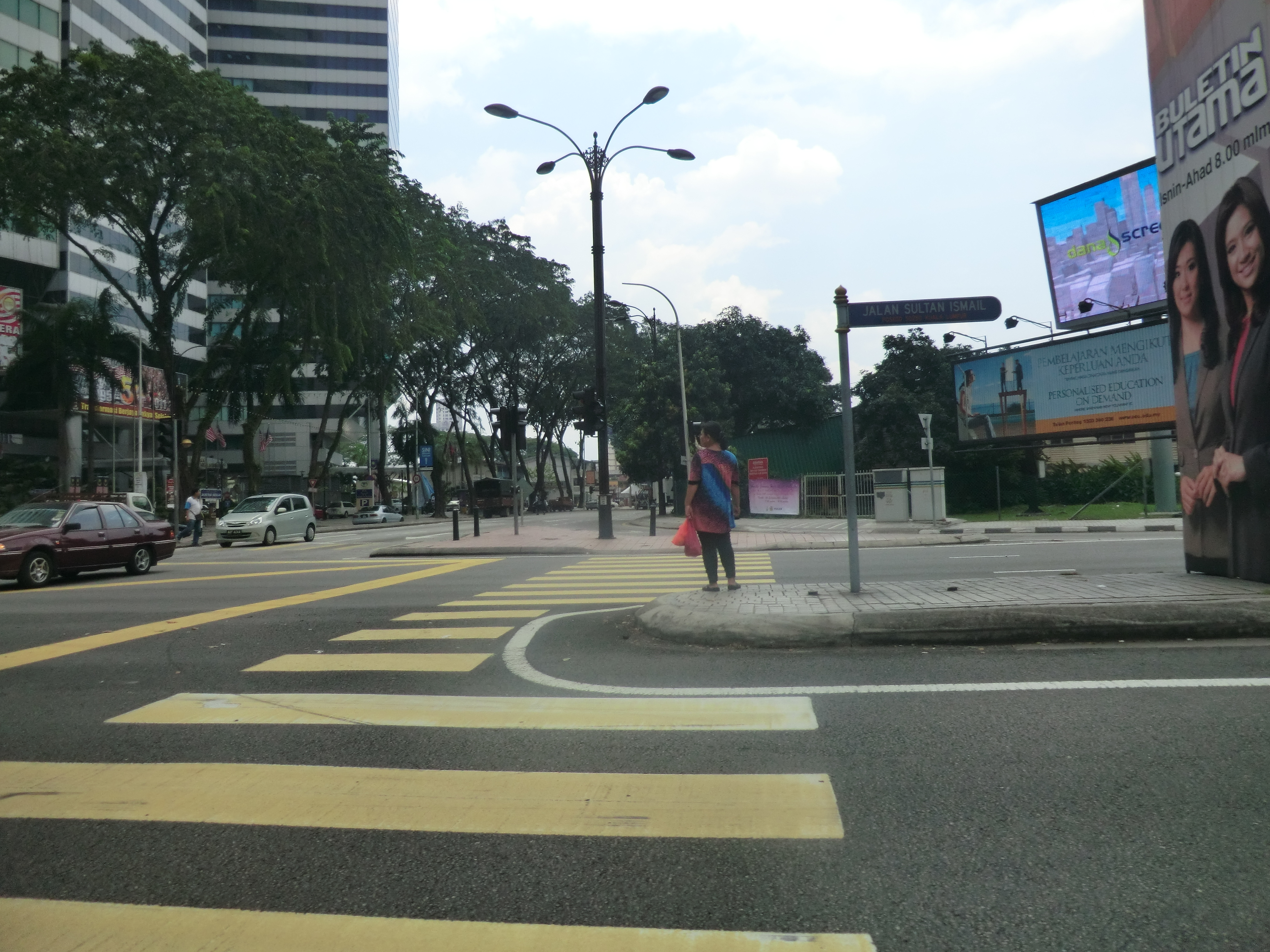
Jalan Raja Abdullah Intersections

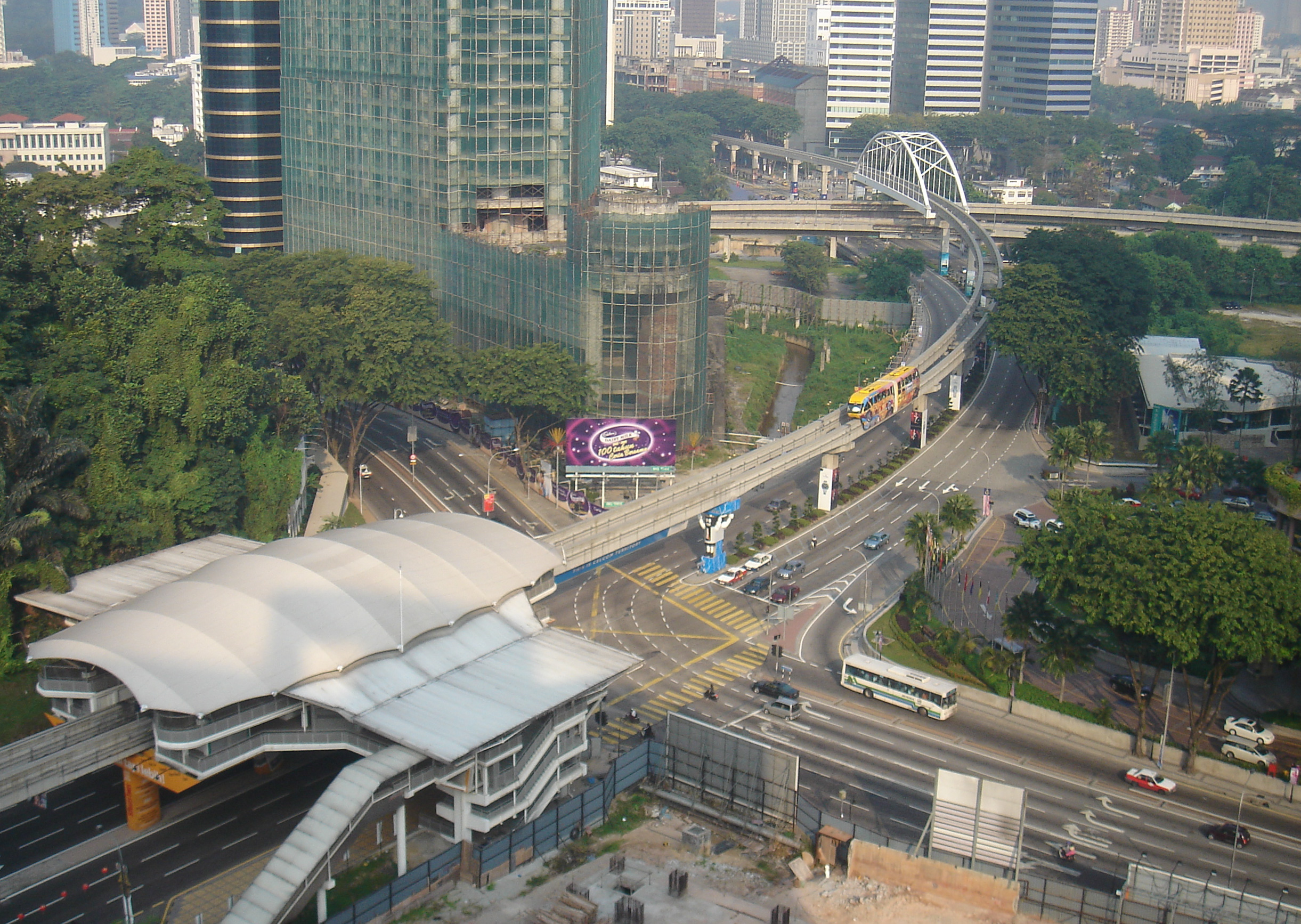
Bukit Nanas station

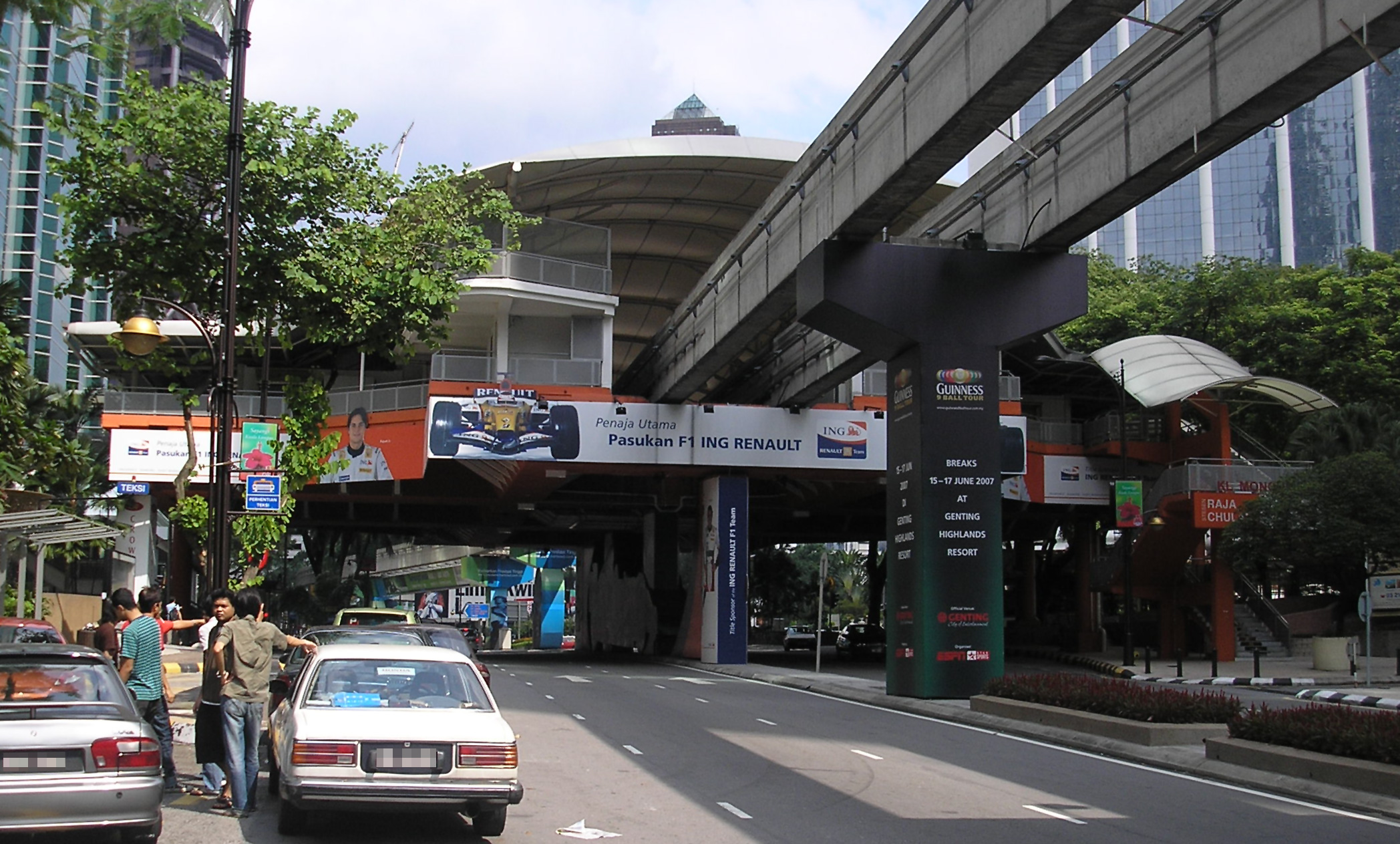
Raja Chulan station

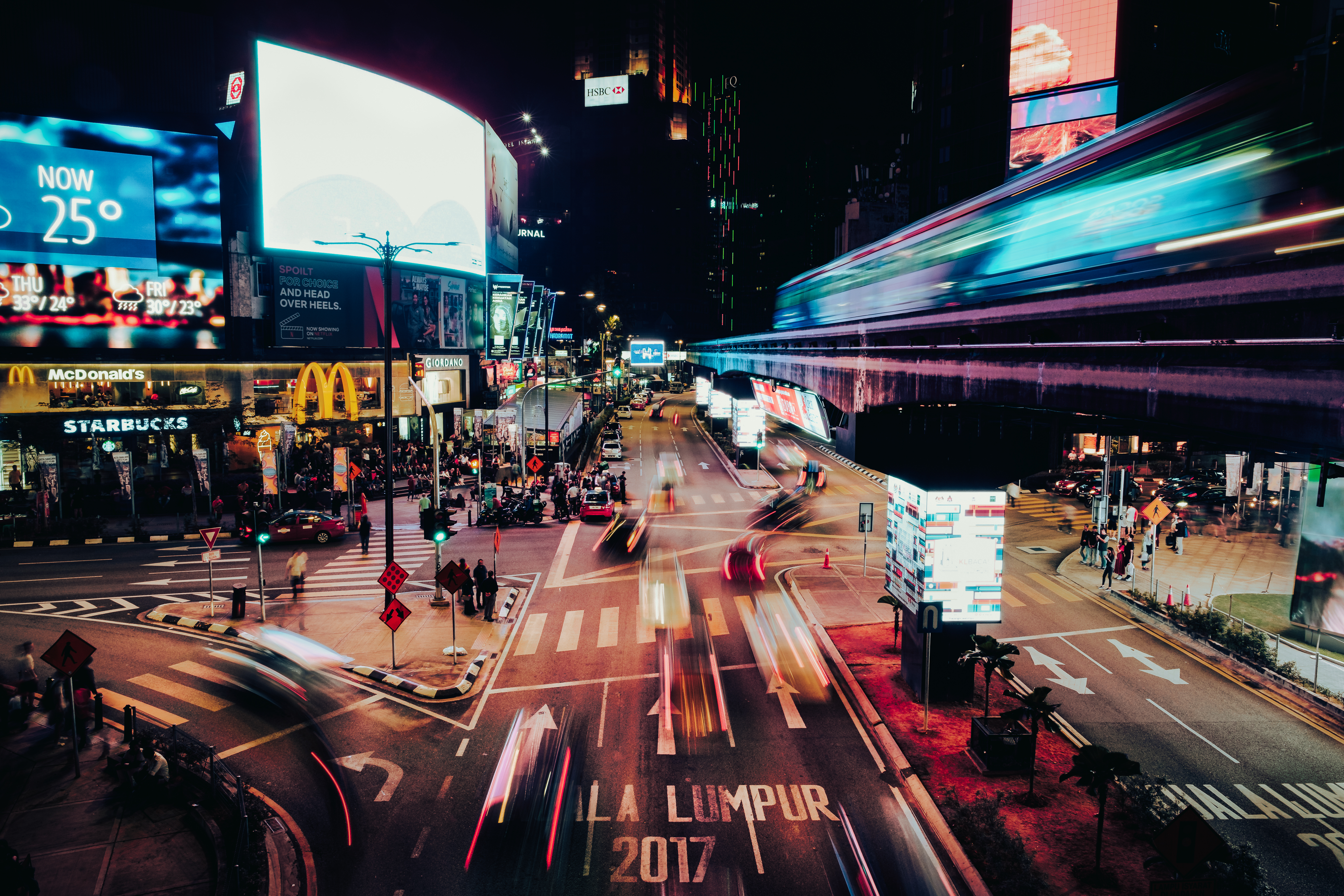
Bukit Bintang

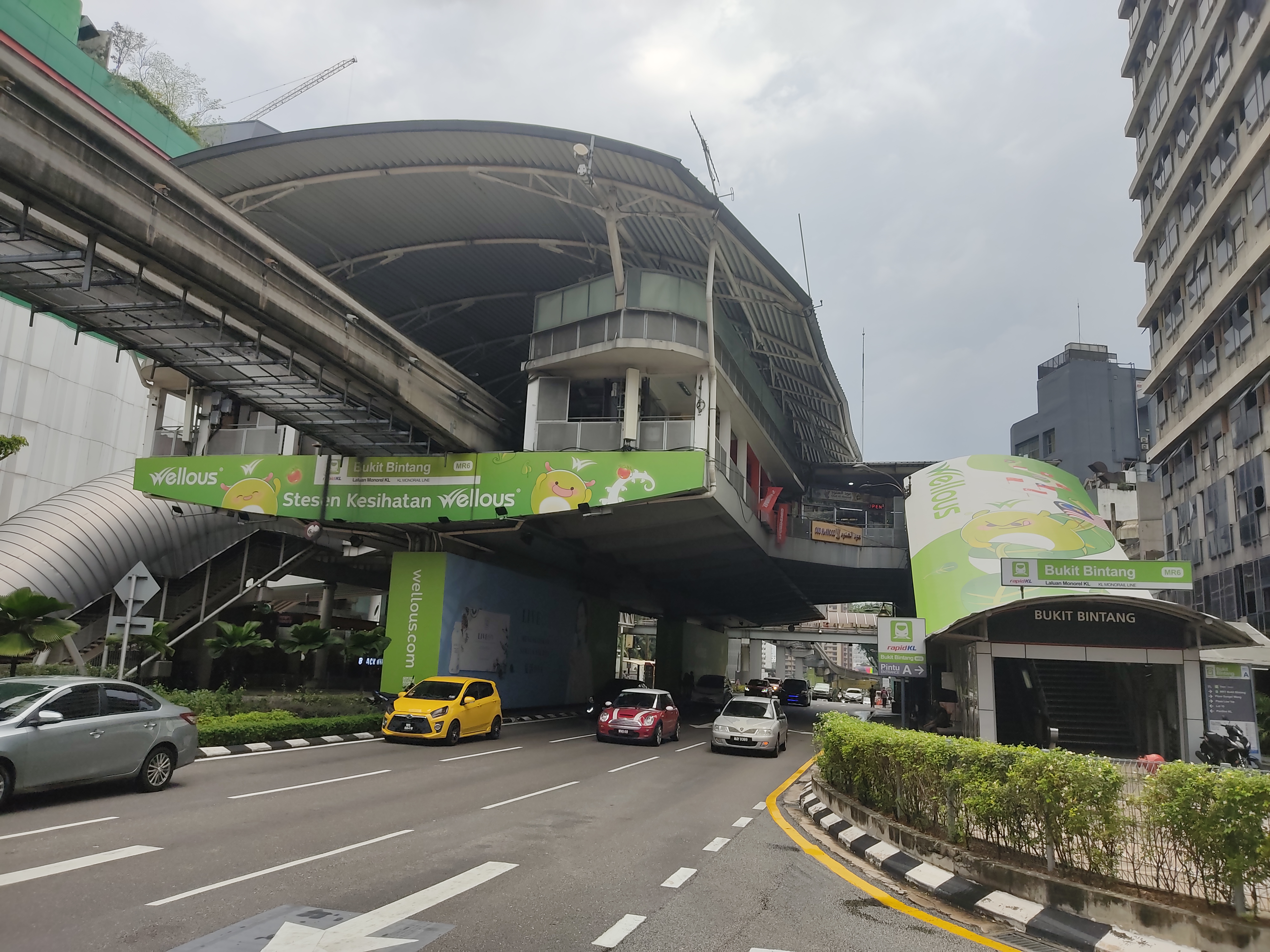
Bukit Bintang Monorail station

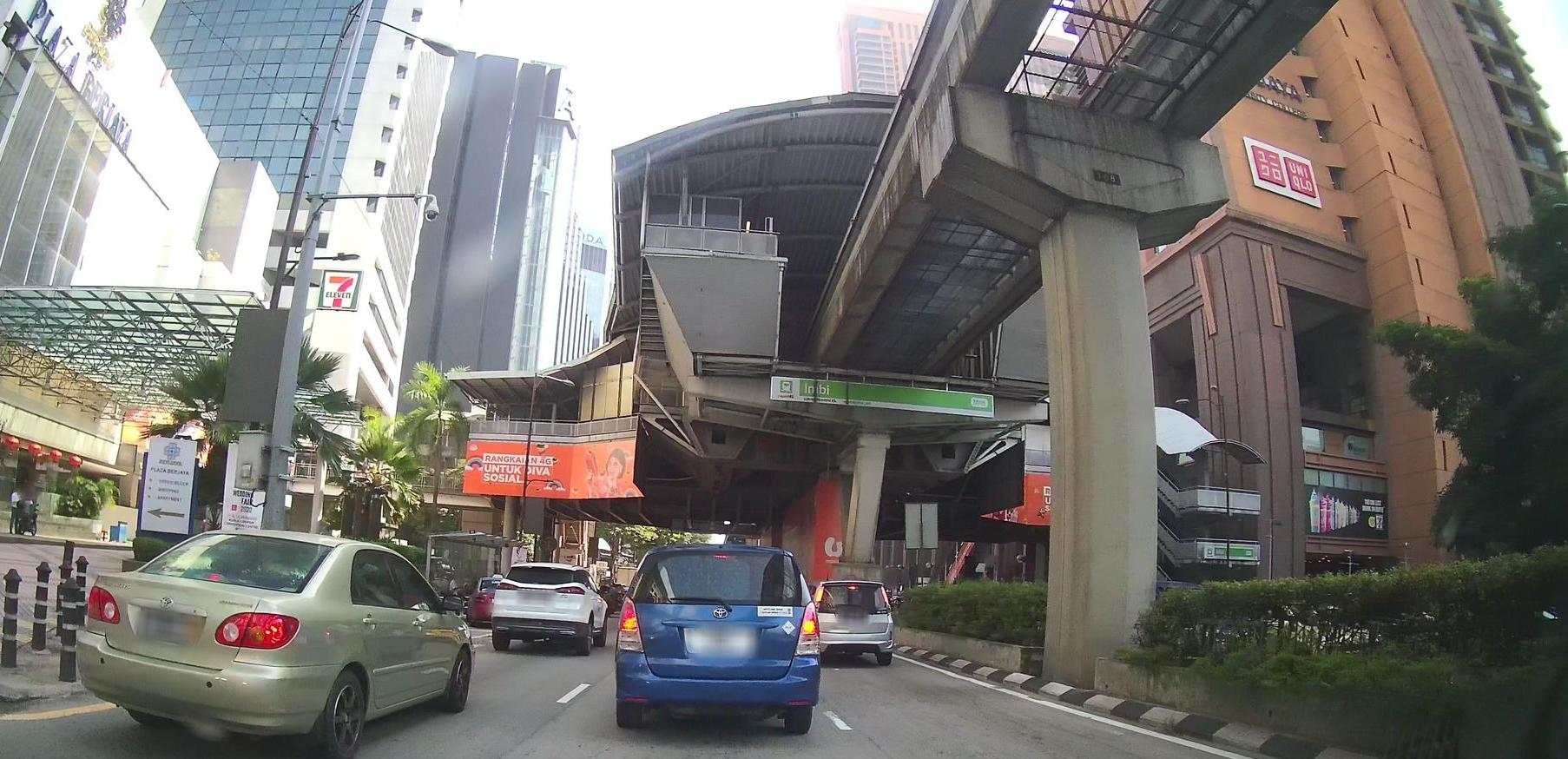
Imbi station

Bukit Bintang City Centre

Hang Tuah station

== See also ==
- Kuala Lumpur Middle Ring Road 1
- Kuala Lumpur Middle Ring Road 2
- Jalan Tuanku Abdul Halim
