= Jalan Sultan Yahya Petra, Kuala Lumpur =

Road in Malaysia

Jalan Sultan Yahya Petra (Jalan Semarak)
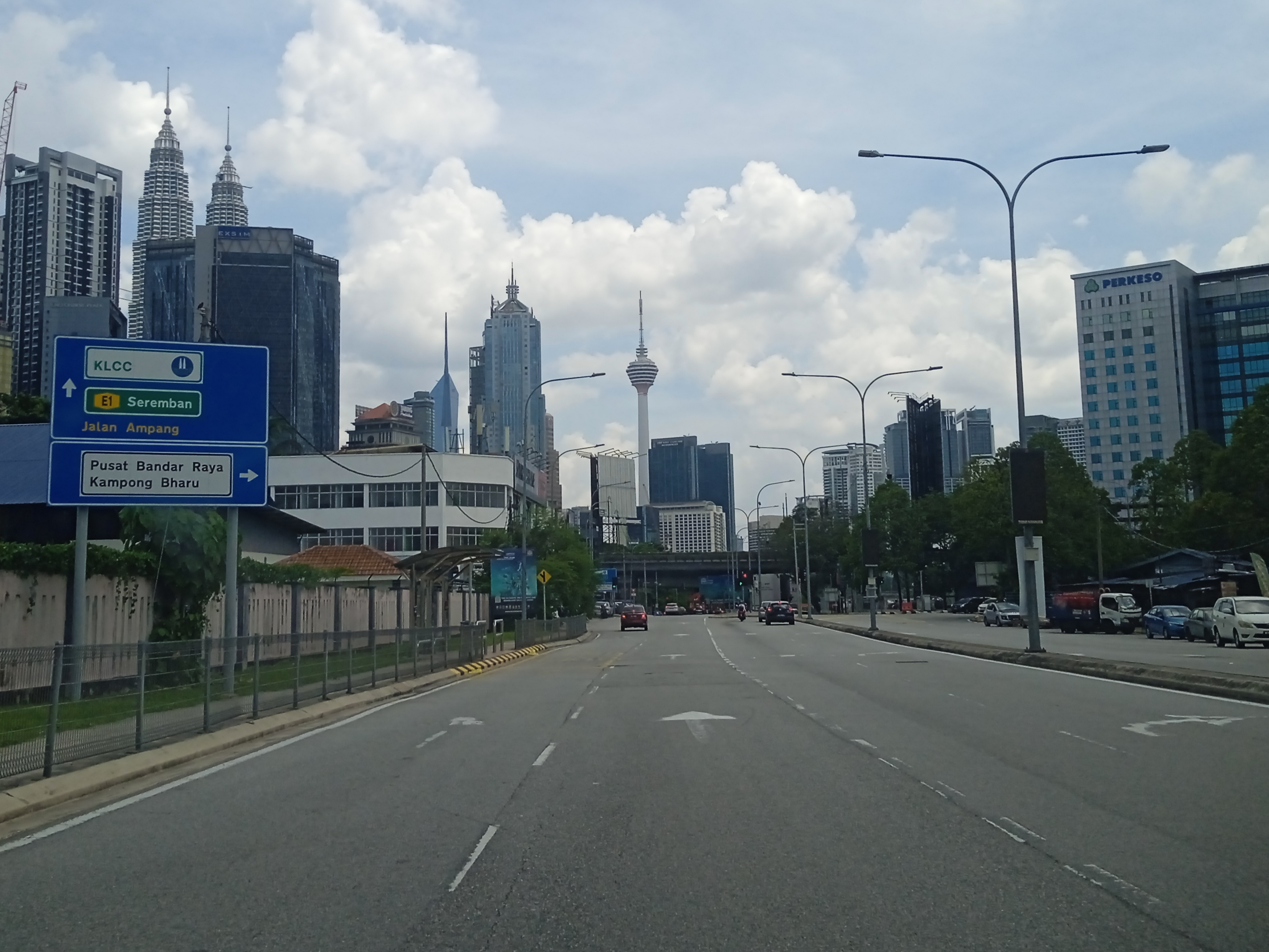

Route information
- Length: 3.50 km (2.17 mi)

Major junctions
- Southwest end: Jalan Tun Razak
- Kuala Lumpur Middle Ring Road 1 Jalan Raja Muda Abdul Aziz; Jalan Padang Tembak; Duta–Ulu Klang ExpresswayDuta–Ulu Klang Expressway
- Northeast end: Kampung Semarak

Location
- Country: Malaysia
- Primary destinations: PULAPOL; Kampung Datuk Keramat

Highway system
- Highways in Malaysia; Expressways; Federal; State

Jalan Sultan Yahya Petra (formerly Jalan Semarak/Jalan Henry Gurney) is a major road in Kuala Lumpur, Malaysia. It was named after the sixth Yang di-Pertuan Agong, Sultan Yahya Petra of Kelantan, who ruled from 1975 to 1979.

== History ==
On 26 November 2014, the Kuala Lumpur City Hall (DBKL) changed the name of Jalan Semarak to Jalan Sultan Yahya Petra.

== List of junctions ==
| km | Exit | Junctions | To | Remarks |
|---|---|---|---|---|
| | | Jalan Tun Razak | Kuala Lumpur Middle Ring Road 1 Northwest; Sentul; Setapak; Ipoh; Kuantan Southeast; Jalan Ampang; Kuala Lumpur City Centre; Sungai Besi; Cheras; Seremban; Petaling Jaya | T-junctions below flyover |
Jalan Sultan Yahya Petra (Jalan Semarak)
| | | Jalan Gurney | Southeast; Jalan Gurney; Kampung Datuk Keramat | T-junctions |
| | | Jalan Raja Muda Abdul Aziz (Princes Road) | West; Jalan Raja Muda Abdul Aziz (Princes Road); Kampung Baru; Jalan Tuanku Abdul Rahman (Batu Road) | T-junctions |
| | | Jalan Perumahan Gurney | Southeast; Jalan Perumahan Gurney; FELDA headquarters Dewan Perdana FELDA | Junctions |
| | | Wisma Tanah | | |
| | | Jalan Maktab | Southeast; Jalan Maktab | T-junctions |
| | | International Business School | | |
| | | Universiti Teknologi Malaysia (UTM) Branch Campus | | |
| | | PULAPOL | Northwest; Royal Malaysian Police Training Centre (PULAPOL) Southeast; Jalan Padang Tembak; Malaysian Ministry of Defence (MINDEF) headquarters Kampung Datuk Keramat | Junctions |
| | | Semarak-DUKE | Duta–Ulu Klang Expressway Duta–Ulu Klang Expressway; Duta–Sentul Pasar–Ulu Klang Link (Main Link); West; Seremban; KLCC; City Centre; Bulatan Pahang; Sentul; Gombak; Batu Caves; Kuantan; Kepong; Jalan Duta; Ipoh; Klang | Half diamond interchange |
Jalan Sultan Yahya Petra (Jalan Semarak)
| | | Kampung Semarak | | |
