= Gusztáv Klados =

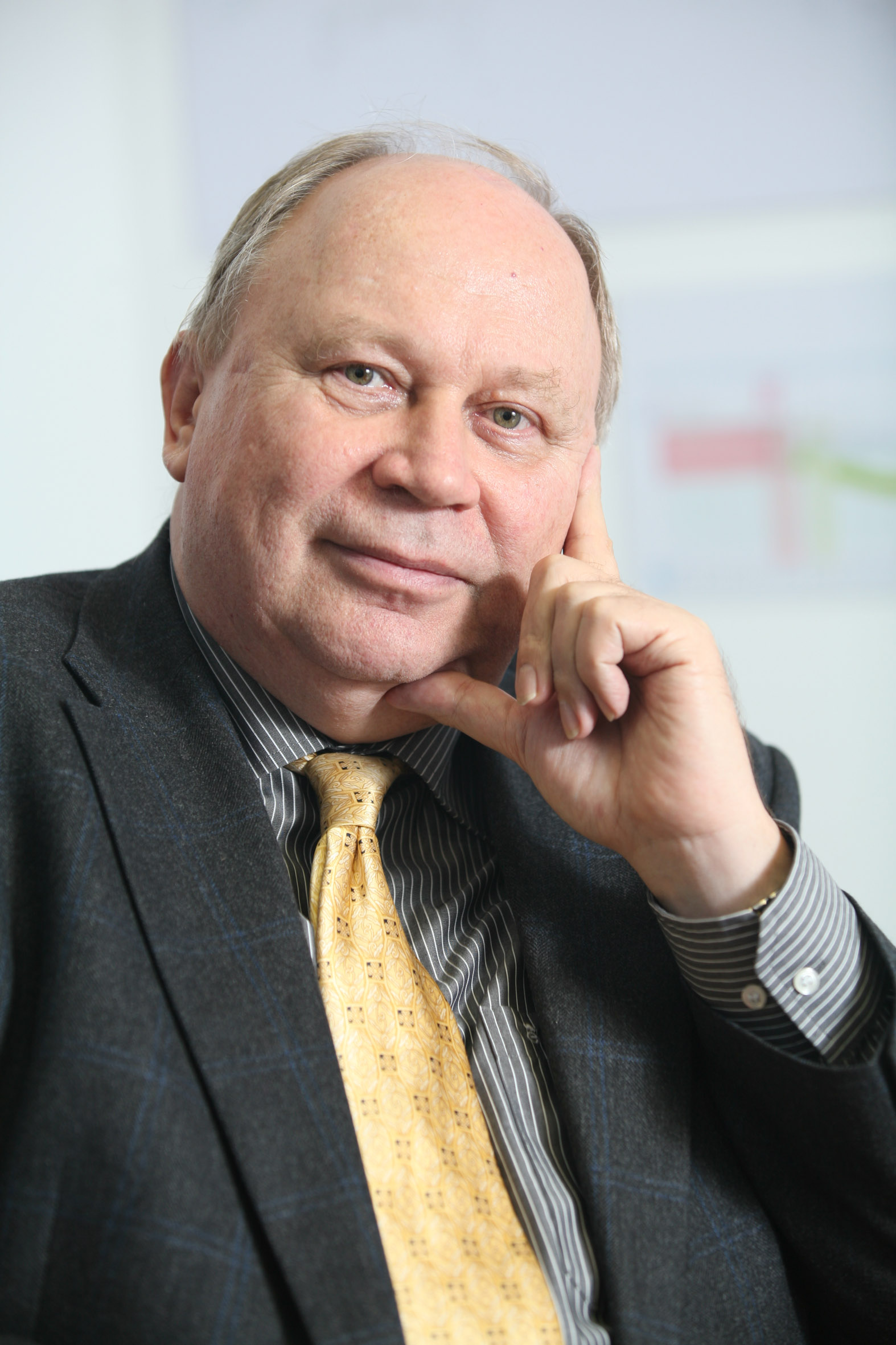
Gusztáv Klados

Gusztáv Klados (Budapest, 1947) is a Hungarian tunnel building engineer, known as one of the leading tunnel builders, having worked around the world on several projects.

== Early life ==
He graduated from the Mátyás Hunyadi High School in Pestlőrinc in 1966). During his university years he worked at the construction of Budapest's Metro line 2 and 3 during the summer. He holds two engineering degrees from the famous Budapest Technical University earned in 1972 and 1976, later he also gained another external trade related degree, unrelated to engineering.

== Work ==
Klados worked as lead engineer or project supervisor on several big projects including the SMART Tunnel in Malaysia, the Channel Tunnel , the metro systems in Delhi, Athens, Calcutta and Budapest. Klados also worked as a building manager in Lesotho, South Africa, where he was building a section of the northern water transport tunnel, later he acted as the chief building manager for the metro lines 2 and 3 of Athens. From 2002-2007, Klados was the senior project manager of the Smart Tunnel project in the Malaysian capital, Kuala Lumpur.

== See also ==
- SMART Tunnel
- Channel Tunnel
