= KLCC Tunnel =

Road tunnel in Kuala Lumpur, Malaysia

Overview
- Location: Kuala Lumpur
- Status: Open
- Route: Kuala Lumpur Middle Ring Road 1
- Start: KLCC Car Parks
- End: Jalan Tun Razak

Operation
- Work began: 1994
- Opened: 1997
- Operator: KLCC Holdings Berhad and Dewan Bandaraya Kuala Lumpur

The KLCC Tunnel (formerly Lorong Kuda) is a tunnel in Kuala Lumpur city, Malaysia. This tunnel is maintained by KLCC Holdings Berhad and Dewan Bandaraya Kuala Lumpur (DBKL) (Kuala Lumpur City Hall).

== List of interchanges ==
Km	Exit	Interchange	To	Remarks
			KLCC Car Parks; Petronas Twin Towers; Suria KLCC; Kuala Lumpur Convention Centre; Menara Maxis	
KLCC Autopay Toll Plaza; Collect ticket and insert ticket after payment
		KLCC Loading/Unloading tunnel	KLCC Loading/unloading Tunnel; Loading/Unloading bay	West bound For lorries only
KLCC Tunnel; Start/End of tunnel
		Jalan Binjal-Persiaran Stonor	North; Jalan Binjal; Jalan Ampang South; Persiaran Stonor; Jalan Kia Peng; Jalan Bukit Bintang	Junctions
		Jalan Tun Razak (South only)	South; Kuala Lumpur Middle Ring Road 1 Jalan Tun Razak (Jalan Pekeliling); Sungai Besi; East–West Link Expressway Cheras; East–West Link Expressway Petaling Jaya; Maju Expressway Putrajaya; North–South Expressway Central Link AH2 Kuala Lumpur International Airport (KLIA); North–South Expressway Southern Route AH2 Seremban; North–South Expressway Southern Route AH2 Melaka; North–South Expressway Southern Route AH2 Johor Bahru	Tunnel interchange Max height: 2.1 m East bound
		Desa Kuda Lari condomunium		
		Wisma Tan & Tan	Embassy of the Federal Republic of Germany; High Commission of the Brunei Darussalam (Canada) Canadian High Commission	
		Jalan Tun Razak (North only)	North; Kuala Lumpur Middle Ring Road 1 Jalan Tun Razak (Jalan Pekeliling); Sentul; Segambut; Setapak; Kuantan; B31 Jalan Ampang; Ampang; Ulu Klang; Setiawangsa	East bound
