= Nahariah Hussein =

Former Malaysian police officer

SAC Dato' Nahariah binti Hussein (born 1958-16 March 2015), is a former Commandant of Police Training Center (PULAPOL). She made history when she became the first woman to be appointed Commander of PULAPOL after 110 years of the institution being established. Previously, the 41 Pulapol commanders in Jalan Semarak, Kuala Lumpur were men. The 41st Pulapol Commander is SAC Zulkifli Mohamad.

Nahariah previously served as Assistant Director of Administration (D1) of Bukit Aman Criminal Investigation Department before she replaced SAC Zulkifli Mohamad for the Pulapol Commander post in 2014.

== Death ==
Nahariah Hussein died after complaining of shortness of breath at the Kuala Lumpur Hospital at age 57.

== Honours ==
- Malaysia :
  - Member of the Order of the Defender of the Realm (AMN) (1997)
  - Officer of the Order of the Defender of the Realm (KMN) (2007)
  - Companion of the Order of Loyalty to the Crown of Malaysia (JSM) (2014)
- Pahang :
  - Knight Companion of the Order of the Crown of Pahang (DIMP) – Dato' (2012)
