= Sultan Ismail–Kampung Pandan Link =

Road in Malaysia

Sultan Ismail-Kampung Pandan Link
- Jalan Davis

Route information
- Existed: 2006–present
- History: Completed in 2008

Major junctions
- West end: Imbi
- Kuala Lumpur Inner Ring Road; Jalan Imbi; Kuala Lumpur Middle Ring Road 1 Jalan Kampung Pandan; Jalan Perkasa
- East end: Jalan Kampung Pandan interchange

Location
- Country: Malaysia
- Primary destinations: KLCC; Bukit Bintang; Ampang; Kampung Pandan; Maluri; Shamelin; Cheras

Highway system
- Highways in Malaysia; Expressways; Federal; State

The Sultan Ismail–Kampung Pandan Link is a major highway in Kuala Lumpur city, Malaysia. This highway is maintained by the Kuala Lumpur City Hall or Dewan Bandaraya Kuala Lumpur (DBKL).

== History ==
The Sultan Ismail–Kampung Pandan Link which connecting from Imbi junctions of Jalan Sultan Ismail and Jalan Imbi to Jalan Kampung Pandan interchange near Kampung Maluri. Construction began on 2006 and was completed on the mid 2008. The projects led by Malaysian Public Works Department (JKR) and DBKL.

== List of interchanges ==
Km	Exit	Interchange	To	Remarks
		Imbi	Kuala Lumpur Inner Ring Road northwest Jalan Sultan Ismail; Jalan Bukit Bintang; Jalan Raja Chulan; Jalan P Ramlee; KLCC Southwest; Jalan Imbi; Jalan Hang Tuah; Jalan Pudu; Stadium Merdeka; Stadium Negara	Junctions
Sultan Ismail-kampung Pandan Link (Jalan Davis)
		Seasons Garden Service Apartment		
		SMART Tunnel	Tunnel; SMART Tunnel SMART Tunnel; East–West Link Expressway Petaling Jaya; East–West Link Expressway Kompleks Sukan Negara; North–South Expressway Southern Route AH2 Seremban; North–South Expressway Southern Route AH2 Melaka; North–South Expressway Southern Route AH2 Johor Bahru	To/From south only Light vehicles only Maximum height limit 2.1 m
		Jalan Changkat Tambi Dollah	West; Jalan Changkat Tambi Dollah	From Bulatan Kampung Pandan
		Kampung Pandan flyover	Below Flyover; Jalan Tun Razak; Cheras; Jalan Chan Sow Lin; Kuala Lumpur Middle Ring Road 1 Ampang; KLCC; Sungai Besi; East–West Link Expressway Petaling Jaya; East–West Link Expressway Kompleks Sukan Negara; North–South Expressway Southern Route AH2 Seremban; North–South Expressway Southern Route AH2 Melaka; North–South Expressway Southern Route AH2 Johor Bahru	Start/End of flyover
		Kampung Pandan flyover Bulatan Kampung Pandan	Below Flyover South; Jalan Tun Razak; Cheras; Jalan Chan Sow Lin Kuala Lumpur Middle Ring Road 1 North; Ampang; KLCC Southwest; Sungai Besi; East–West Link Expressway Petaling Jaya; East–West Link Expressway Kompleks Sukan Negara; North–South Expressway Southern Route AH2 Seremban; North–South Expressway Southern Route AH2 Melaka; North–South Expressway Southern Route AH2 Johor Bahru	Stack roundabout interchange
		Kampung Pandan flyover	Below Flyover; Jalan Tun Razak; Cheras; Jalan Chan Sow Lin; Kuala Lumpur Middle Ring Road 1 Ampang; KLCC; Sungai Besi; East–West Link Expressway Petaling Jaya; East–West Link Expressway Kompleks Sukan Negara; North–South Expressway Southern Route AH2 Seremban; North–South Expressway Southern Route AH2 Melaka; North–South Expressway Southern Route AH2 Johor Bahru	Start/End of flyover
		Jalan Kampung Pandan	North; Jalan Kampung Pandan; Kampung Pandan; Jalan Desa Pandan; Ampang	Diamond interchange
Sultan Ismail-kampung Pandan Link (Jalan Kampung Pandan); Start/End of highway
Jalan Perkasa
			East; Jalan Perkasa; Maluri; Shamelin	
