= SMART Tunnel =

Hybrid highway/flood mitigation tunnel in Kuala Lumpur, Malaysia

Expressway 38
- Stormwater Management And Road Tunnel (SMART Tunnel); Terowong Jalan dan Pengurusan Air Banjir (Terowong SMART) 精明隧道
- East Kuala Lumpur map with the SMART Tunnel

Route information
- Maintained by Syarikat Mengurus Air Banjir dan Terowong Sdn Bhd (SMART)
- Length: 4 km (2.5 mi)
- Existed: 2003–present
- History: Construction works started November 2003, and were completed in 2007

Major junctions
- North end: Sultan Ismail–Kampung Pandan Link; Jalan Tun Razak
- Sultan Ismail–Kampung Pandan Link; Kuala Lumpur Middle Ring Road 1 (Jalan Tun Razak); Kuala Lumpur–Seremban Expressway; East–West Link Expressway
- South end: SMART Tunnel toll plaza near Sungai Besi Airport

Location
- Country: Malaysia
- Primary destinations: Bukit Bintang, Imbi, Tun Razak Exchange, Cheras, Petaling Jaya, Seremban

Highway system
- Highways in Malaysia; Expressways; Federal; State

Stormwater Management And Road Tunnel
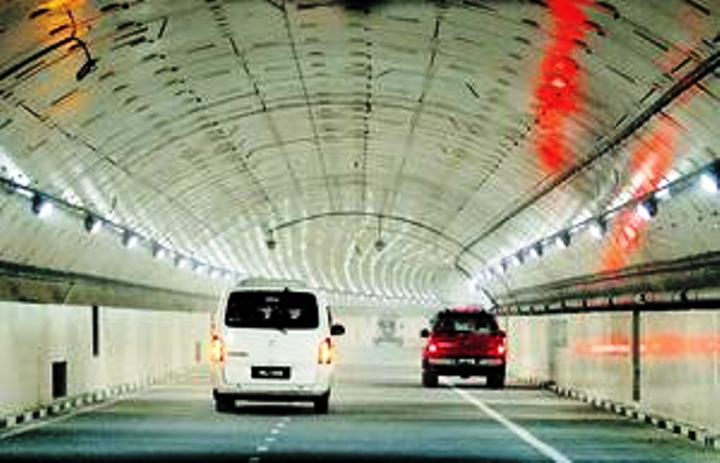
- Southbound upper deck of the SMART Tunnel
- Interactive map of Stormwater Management And Road Tunnel

Overview
- Location: Kuala Lumpur, Malaysia
- Status: Operational
- Route: E38
- Start: Jalan Tun Razak on Kuala Lumpur Middle Ring Road 1
- End: Sungai Besi Airport on Kuala Lumpur–Seremban Expressway

Operation
- Work began: 2003
- Constructed: Gamuda Berhad; MMC Corporation Berhad
- Opened: 2007
- Owner: Government of Malaysia; Malaysian Highway Authority (LLM); Department of Irrigation and Drainage Malaysia (JPS)
- Operator: Syarikat Mengurus Air Banjir dan Terowong Sdn Bhd (SMART)
- Toll: Private cars and taxis

Technical
- Length: 4 km (2.5 mi)
- No. of lanes: 4, double-decked
- Operating speed: 60 km/h

The Stormwater Management And Road Tunnel (SMART Tunnel), E38, is a storm drainage and road structure in Kuala Lumpur, Malaysia, and a major national project in the country. The 9.7 km (6.0 mi) tunnel is the longest stormwater drainage tunnel in Southeast Asia and second longest in Asia.

The main objective of this tunnel is to solve the problem of flash floods in Kuala Lumpur and to reduce traffic jams along Jalan Sungai Besi and Loke Yew flyover at Pudu during rush hour. There are two components of this tunnel, the stormwater tunnel and motorway tunnel. It is the longest multi-purpose tunnel in the world.

In 2011, the SMART tunnel received the UN Habitat Scroll of Honour Award for its innovative and unique management of storm water and peak hour traffic.

It begins at Kampung Berembang lake near Klang River at Ampang and ends at Taman Desa lake near Kerayong River at Salak South. The project is led by the government, including Malaysian Highway Authority (Lembaga Lebuhraya Malaysia, LLM) and the Department of Irrigation and Drainage Malaysia (Jabatan Pengairan dan Saliran, JPS) and also a company joint venture pact between Gamuda Berhad and MMC Corporation Berhad (MMC).

== Route background ==
The Kilometre Zero of the tunnel is located at Salak Interchange.

== History ==
In 2001 the Government sought proposals for a solution that would allow a typical flood of three to six hours' duration to occur without flooding the city centre. A tunnel that would allow floods to bypass the centre was one way of achieving this, providing it was coupled with temporary storage facilities to keep flows downstream of Kuala Lumpur within the capacity of the river channel. A group led by Gamuda engaged SSP, a large Malaysian consultant engineering firm, and Mott MacDonald UK to develop proposals for a tunnel with holding ponds at upstream and downstream ends of the tunnel.

Construction of the tunnel began on 25 November 2003. Two Herrenknecht Tunnel Boring Machines (TBM) from Germany were used, including Tuah on north side and Gemilang on south side. Gusztáv Klados was the senior project manager of the project.

On 11 December 2003, the 13.2-m diameter Mixshield TBM, Tuah, completed a 737-m section after 24 weeks of excavation. By the end of January 2004, Tuah would start a second drive covering a distance of 4.5 km to Kampung Berembang lake. The motorway sections on the SMART system was officially opened at 3:00PM, 14 May 2007, after multiple delays.

Meanwhile, the stormwater sections on the SMART system began operations at the end of January 2007.

By 18 July 2010 the SMART system had prevented seven potentially disastrous flash floods in the city centre, having entered its first mode 3 operation only weeks after the opening of the motorway.

As of September 2020, the tunnel had activated its fourth mode for the seventh time. During the flash flood on 10 September 2020, the tunnel diverted three million cubic metres of water.

In December 2021, SMART entered Mode 4 for an eighth time, due to the massive flooding caused by heavy rainfall lasting from 16 to 18 December. The tunnel was again activated and spared the center of Kuala Lumpur from a potentially catastrophic flood, having successfully diverted 5 million cubic metres of flood water during the 22 hours it was on full activation.

In 2022, the government was considering the proposal to build another tunnel, briefly known as SMART 2, to cater for high density flood-prone area such as Shah Alam.

== Functioning ==
The four modes of operation and storage capacity.

=== Mode 1 ===
The first mode, under normal conditions where there is no storm, no flood water will be diverted into the system.

=== Mode 2 ===
When the second mode is activated, flood water is diverted into the bypass tunnel underneath the motorway tunnel. The motorway section is still open to traffic at this stage.

=== Mode 3 ===
When the third mode is in operation, the motorway will be closed to all traffic.

=== Mode 4 ===
After making sure all vehicles have exited the motorway, automated water-tight gates will be opened to allow flood waters to pass through.

=== Reopening to traffic ===
After the flood has ended, the tunnel is verified and cleaned via pressure-washing, and the motorway will be reopened to traffic within 48 hours of closure.

== Technical specifications ==
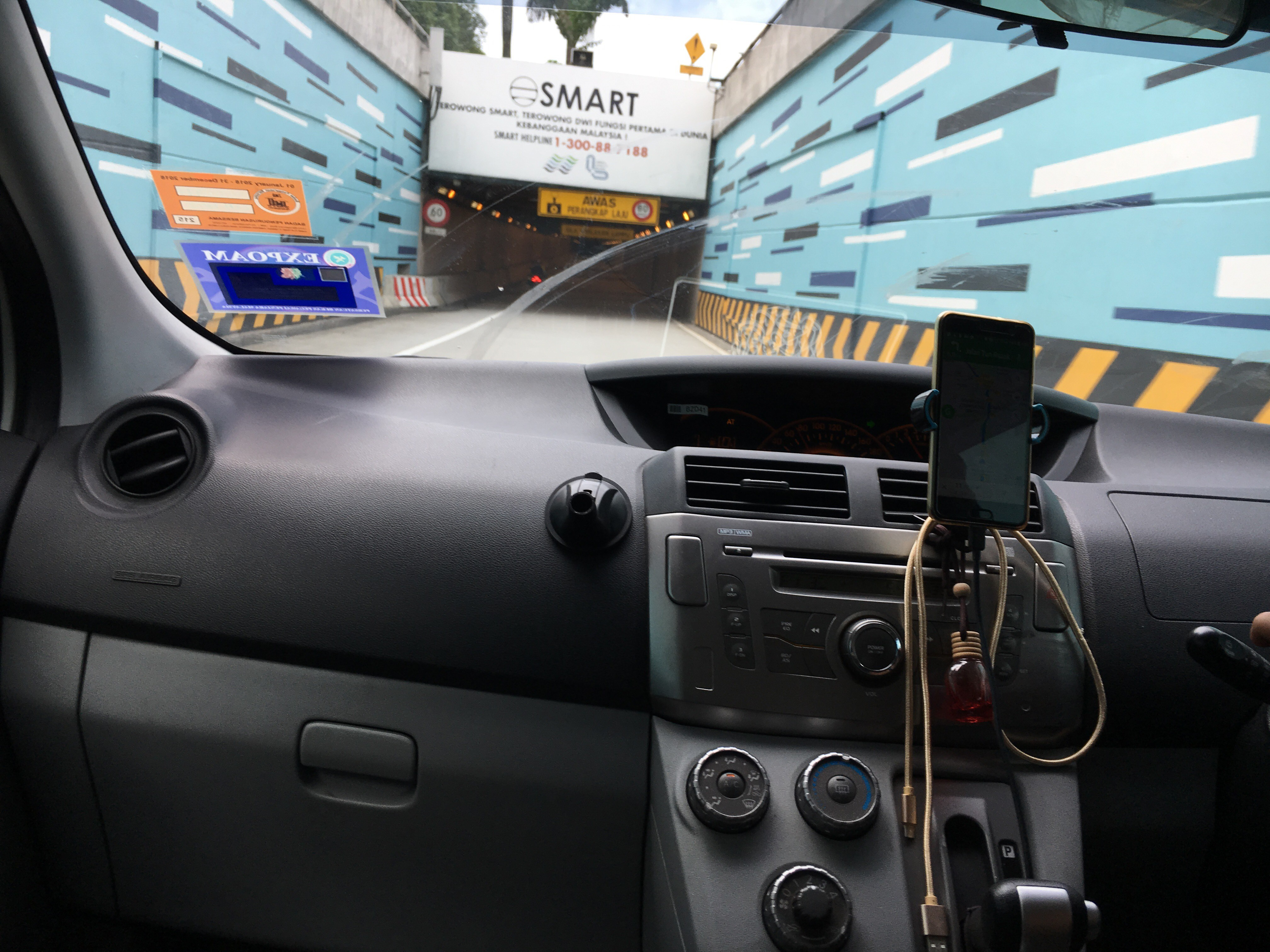
SMART tunnel entrance along Jalan Sungai Besi, Kuala Lumpur, Malaysia.

=== Stormwater tunnel ===
- Construction cost: RM1,887 million (US$514.6 million)
- Stormwater tunnel length: 9.7 km (6.0 mi)
- Diameter: 13.2 m (43.3 ft) (outer diameter)
- Tunnelling method: tunnel boring machine (TBM)
- TBM type: slurry shield

=== Motorway tunnel ===
- Motorway tunnel length: 4 km (2.5 mi)
- Structure type: double deck
- Ingress and egress: 1.5 km (0.93 mi) at Jalan Sultan Ismail and Jalan Imbi
- Length: 1.4 km (0.87 mi) at Jalan Tun Razak
- Links: 1.6 km (0.99 mi) at Kuala Lumpur–Seremban Expressway Links: City Centre near Kg. Pandan Roundabout KL–Seremban Expressway near Sungai Besi Airport

== Features ==
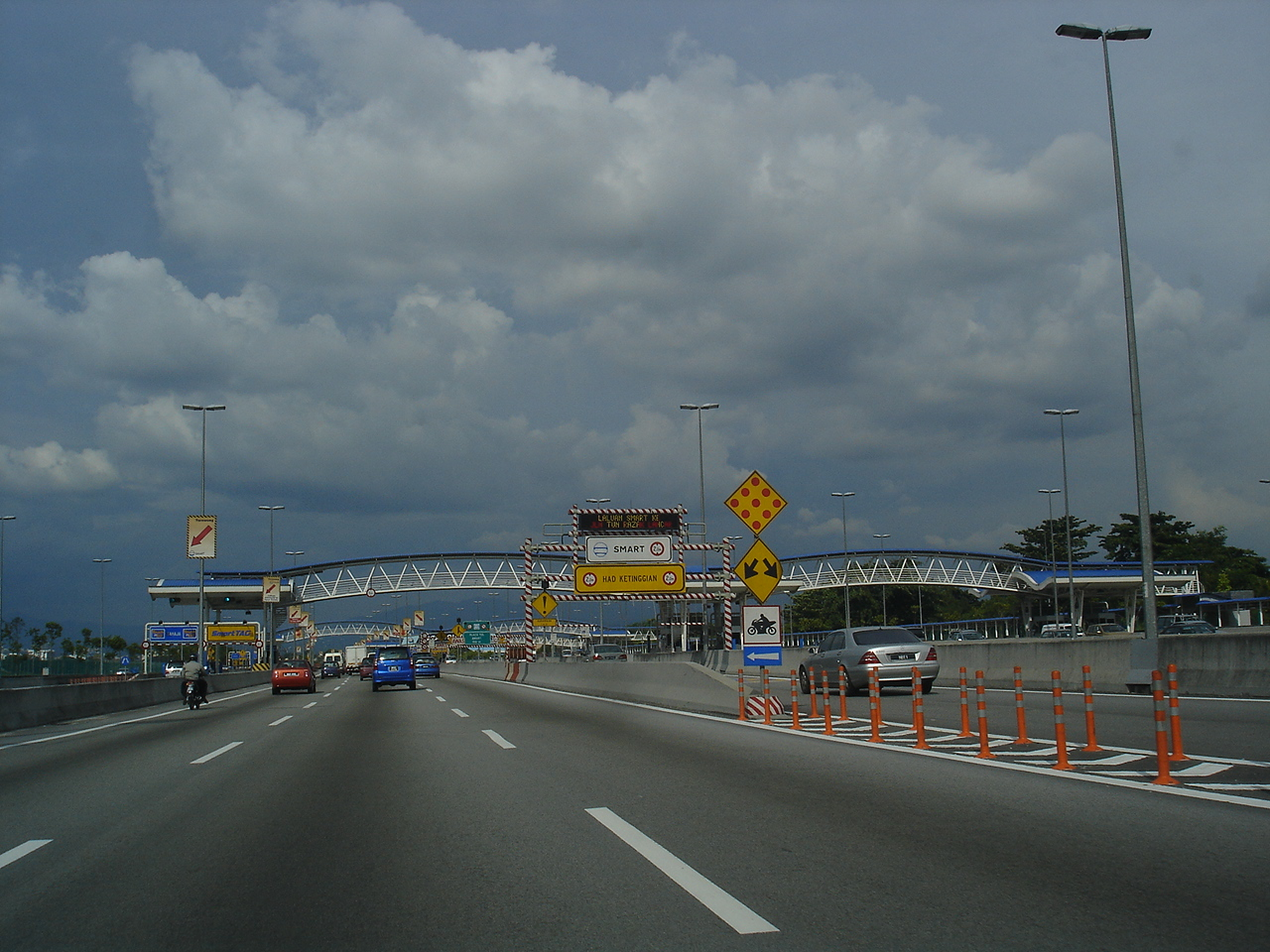
The north bound entrance of SMART Tunnel on the Kuala Lumpur–Seremban Expressway.

- World's first dual-function tunnel (stormwater management & road)
- Longest tunnel in Malaysia
- 9.7 km (6.03 miles) stormwater by-pass tunnel
- 4 km (2.49 miles) double-deck motorway within stormwater tunnel
- The motorway tunnel is suitable for light vehicles only. Motorcycles and heavy vehicles are not allowed
- Ingress and egress connections to the motorway tunnel linking the southern gateway to the city centre
- Holding basin complete with diversion and tunnel intake structures
- Storage reservoir and a twin-box culvert to release flood discharge
- State-of-the-art operations control room equipped with the latest systems in operations management, surveillance and maintenance of the SMART system.
- Custom-made fire engine units consisting of two modified Toyota Hilux pickup trucks, parked at two different locations for quick access to the tunnel in case of fire on both carriageways.

== Tolls ==
The SMART Tunnel utilizes an open toll system. Ever since its operation, all toll transactions at this toll plaza are carried out using Touch 'n Go cards, MyRFIDs or SmartTAGs. Cash payments are not accepted.

=== Toll rates ===
Class	Type of vehicles	Rate (in Malaysian ringgit (RM))	Notes
1	Private Cars (Vehicles with two axles and three or four wheels and not exceeding 2.4 metres in height)	3.00	—N/a
2	Vans and other small goods vehicles (Vehicles with two axles and three or four wheels and not exceeding 2.4 metres in height)	3.00	—N/a
4	Taxis (Vehicles with two axles and three or four wheels and not exceeding 2.4 metres in height)	3.00	Toll charges are paid by passengers using Touch 'n Go cards only.

== FM radio channels available ==
Radio	Frequencies
Nasional FM	87.7 MHz
BFM 89.9	89.9 MHz
TraXX FM	100.1 MHz
IKIMfm	91.5 MHz
Hitz	92.9 MHz
Bernama Radio	93.9 MHz
Radio Klasik	95.3 MHz
Fly FM	95.8 MHz
KL FM	97.2 MHz
Hot FM	97.6 MHz
988 FM	98.8 MHz
Kool 101	101.3 MHz
Era	103.3 MHz
Suria	105.3 MHz

== Interchange lists ==
The entire expressway had its speed limit of 60 km/h, maximum height 2 m and located in Federal Territory of Kuala Lumpur.

Legend:

- I/C - Interchange, I/S - Intersection, RSA - Rest and service area, OBR - Overhead bridge restaurant, R/R - Restaurant and rest plaza, L/B - Layby, V/P - Vista point, TN - tunnel, T/P - Toll plaza, BR - Bridge
- C - Cloverleaf, S - Stack, T-A - Trumpet-A, T-B - Trumpet-B, DT - Directional-T/Y, SDT - Semi-Directional-T/Y, P-Y - Partial-Y, D - Diamond, P-C - Partial cloverleaf, D-D - Diverging diamond, D-R - Direct ramp

km	Exit	Sections	Name	Destinations	Notes
Through to Kuala Lumpur–Seremban Expressway
0.0	–	Dry	–		
	T/P	Dry	SMART toll plaza	Touch 'n Go SmartTAG	
	3801	Dry	Motorway Tunnel; Tunnel exit south bound	3801A; SMART Tunnel Operation Office; East–West Link Expressway – Cheras, Petaling Jaya, Shah Alam 3801B; Kuala Lumpur–Seremban Expressway – KL Sports City, Klang; North–South Expressway Southern Route / AH2 – Kuala Lumpur International Airport (KLIA), Seremban, Malacca, Johor Bahru	Tunnel Interchange
		Wet	Motorway Tunnel; Wet sections		
	3802	Dry	Motorway Tunnel; Tunnel exit north bound	3802A; Sultan Ismail Link Tunnel (Jalan Davis-Kuala Lumpur Inner Ring Road) – Jalan Imbi, Jalan Sultan Ismail, Jalan Bukit Bintang 3802B; Kuala Lumpur Middle Ring Road 1-Jalan Tun Razak (Jalan Pekeliling) – Kuala Lumpur City Centre (KLCC), Ampang	Tunnel Interchange; Lower floor
Through to Kuala Lumpur Middle Ring Road 1

== In popular culture ==
The tunnel was featured in the below series:

- Season 4, Episode 2, of Extreme Engineering, titled "MegaTunnel", on the Discovery Channel.
- An episode of Truly Malaysia on the National Geographic Channel and TV1.
- Season 2, Episode 3, of Man Made Marvels, titled "Kuala Lumpur: Flood Control", on the Science Channel.
- Season 4, Episode 2, of Megastructures on the National Geographic Channel and TV1.
- Season 1, Episode 2 of Build It Bigger on the Science Channel.
- The tunnel is also featured in the 2nd film of Ejen Ali.
- Chapter 6 of "KL Tower of Terror", a novel by Nayli Nasran.

== See also ==
- List of long tunnels by type
