= PULAPOL =

Police academy in Malaysia

Police Training Centre of Malaysia
- Pusat Latihan Polis
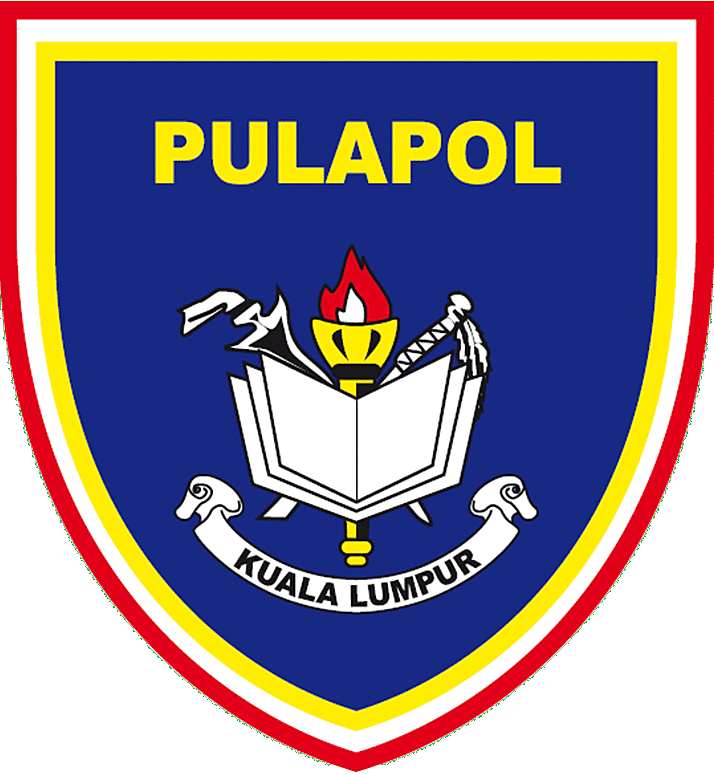
- Seal of the Police Training Centre of Malaysia
- Other name: Pulapol
- Type: Public
- Established: 20 November 1904; 121 years ago
- Affiliations: Royal Malaysia Police
- Commandant: SAC Dato' Shamsudin bin Mat
- Administrative staff: ACP Safwan Afiq Bin Mohd Samion
- Location: Kuala Lumpur, Malaysia
- Campus: Semarak Street

The Malaysian Police Training Centre (Malay: Pusat Latihan Polis, Pulapol) is the oldest police academy in Malaysia and the training institute for Royal Malaysia Police. It is located at Semarak Street (formerly Henry Gurney Street), Kuala Lumpur. It is the place where the police is trained under the government. Learning in Pulapol encompasses training aspect, from academic or practical. Pulapol has seven branches: Pulapol Jalan Semarak, Kuala Lumpur, Pulapol Bukit Sentosa, Rawang, Pulapol Air Hitam, Negeri Sembilan, Pulapol Segamat, Johor, Pulapol Langkawi, Kedah, Pulapol Dungun, Terengganu, Pulapol Kota Kinabalu, Sabah and Pulapol Kuching, Sarawak. The police trainees will be guaranteed to have a job and will be trained for six or nine months there.

== History ==
On 20 November 1904, the first Police Training Centre was formed under the Federated Malay States Police by Captain Graham, the Malay States Guides container officer. It was located at Bluff Road which was later renamed as Bukit Aman Street. It is now the location of Bukit Aman's Police Headquarters which used VB to be called Malay States Guides Command Headquarters of Kuala Lumpur. The area consists of 249.5 acres or 41.6 hectare. In 1905, the centre admitted its first intake with 207 Malay and 219 Indian recruits.

In 1920, a new Police Training Centre was proposed when the old facility was unable to accommodate the increasing intake of the police trainees. The effort to build the new centre was postponed because of the economic depression until it was reviewed five years later. An area near the Gurney Road was chosen and throughout the 1930s, constructions for the academy was done. In October 1940, the Police Training Centre in Bluff Road transferred to the new Police Training Centre at Gurney Road (currently Jalan Semarak), Kuala Lumpur.

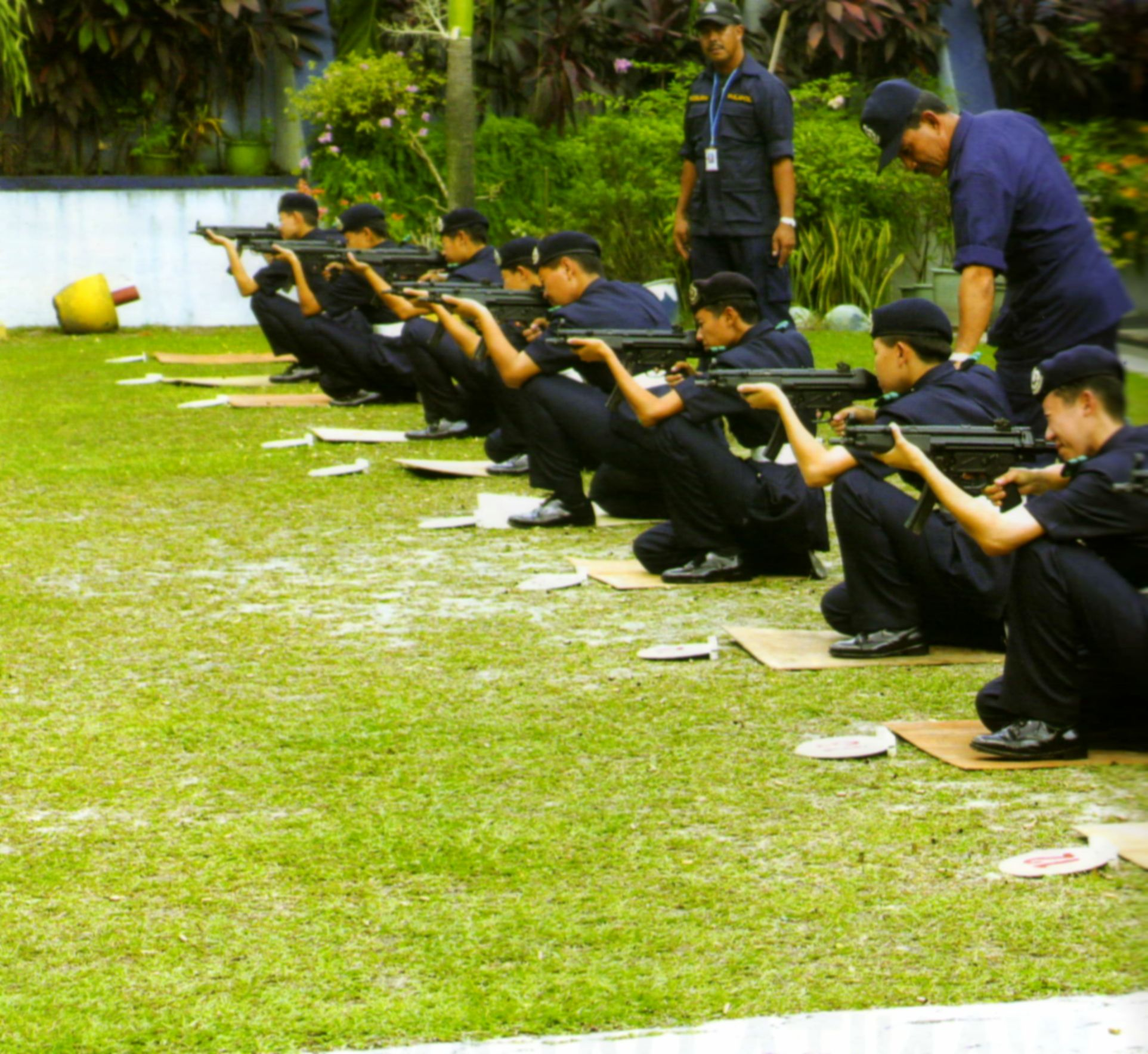
Recruits of Royal Malaysian Police with senior police officers in a shooting course, armed with HK MP5 at Pulapol Kuala Lumpur, Malaysia.

In 1941, the training programme was halted because of the invasion by the Japanese Imperial Army. Most of the police officers from the centre were called to serve against the military attack and at the beginning of the occupation until eight police officers were left.

Once Malaya had fallen under the Japanese occupation, the Police Training Centre was turned into the Japanese's Military Police Headquarters. In August 1945, British army retook the training centre and later it was reconstructed as the largest training centre for the police force. During 1945 and 1946, Mr. J.D. Fairhead acted as the Police Training Centre Commander after Japanese rule. From then to 1957, the training centre was commanded by the British military personnel.

In 1957, Malaya achieved her independence from the Britain and the training centre was then given to Sir Merican Bin Sutan as its first Malay Commandant from 25 November 1957 to 24 November 1959. From 1940 to 2007, the training centre was led by at least 40 Commandants in its lifetime. By 1977, this institution was now familiarly known as Pulapol (Police Training Centre) and trained at least 2,200 recruits per session.

In June 2018, Commandant, SAC Shamsudin Bin Mat has made a compulsory move for the Senior Police Officers whom are serving in Pulapol to pursue their education in Master in Business Administration. Upon motivation and encouragement by the Commandant, SAC Shamsudin Bin Mat, 30 senior police officers are pursuing their MBA.

On the 16 January 2019, during a Ponggal celebration in Pulapol, SAC Shamsudin Bin Mat told Makkal Osai reporter Gopi, that a small Hindu temple located at Police Training Centre (Pulapol) will be rebuilt. The temple had been there for a long time and numerous efforts to upgrade and expand the temple had not been successful. However Inspector General of Police, Tan Sri Mohamad Fuzi Harun had given instructions to expand the temple. The Training Centre currently has a mosque, a Sikh temple a Buddhist Shrine along with the Hindu temple.

== First female commandant ==
On 16 January 2014, SAC Nahariah Hussein, 57, a D1 assistant principal director (Administration) of Bukit Aman CID, was appointed as the 42nd commandant of Pulapol when she took over from SAC Zulkifli Mohamad bringing her as a first female commandant since it was established in 1904.

== Notable alumni ==
▪️Tan Sri Abdul Rahman Hashim, 1991– Inspector General of Police 3rd (1973–1974) he died in assassination by communist subversive on 7 Jun 1974 at Kuala Lumpur

▪️Tan Sri Tun Mohammed Hanif Omar,1960 – Inspector General of Police 4th (1974–1994)

▪️Tan Sri Rahim Noor, 1970 – Inspector General of Police 5th (1994–1999)

Entertainment

- Shamsul Ghau Ghau, 1990 (PULAPAH Jempol) – Comedian, singer, actor, TV host and preacher
- Yahya Sulong, 1949 – Comedian era 70s
- Razif Salmin, 1986 – Stuntman and antagonist actor

== In popular culture ==
- Akademi Polis Season 1 to Season 6 Malay drama background before and after became police officer starring Serina Redzwan, Faezrul Khan, Anding Indrawani and Ozlyn Waty. Featured TV9 (Malaysia) on 2008 until late 2011.
- Polis Evo, a Malaysian buddy cop action comedy set at the Kuala Terengganu campus, starring Shaheizy Sam and Zizan Razak in 2015 and 2023 in Polis Evo 3.
- Bopeng, a Malaysian action comedy starring Nabil Ahmad and Johan Asa'ri in 2017.

== See also ==
- Royal Malaysian Police College Kuala Lumpur
