= Bandar Sri Permaisuri =

Sri Permaisuri
- Township
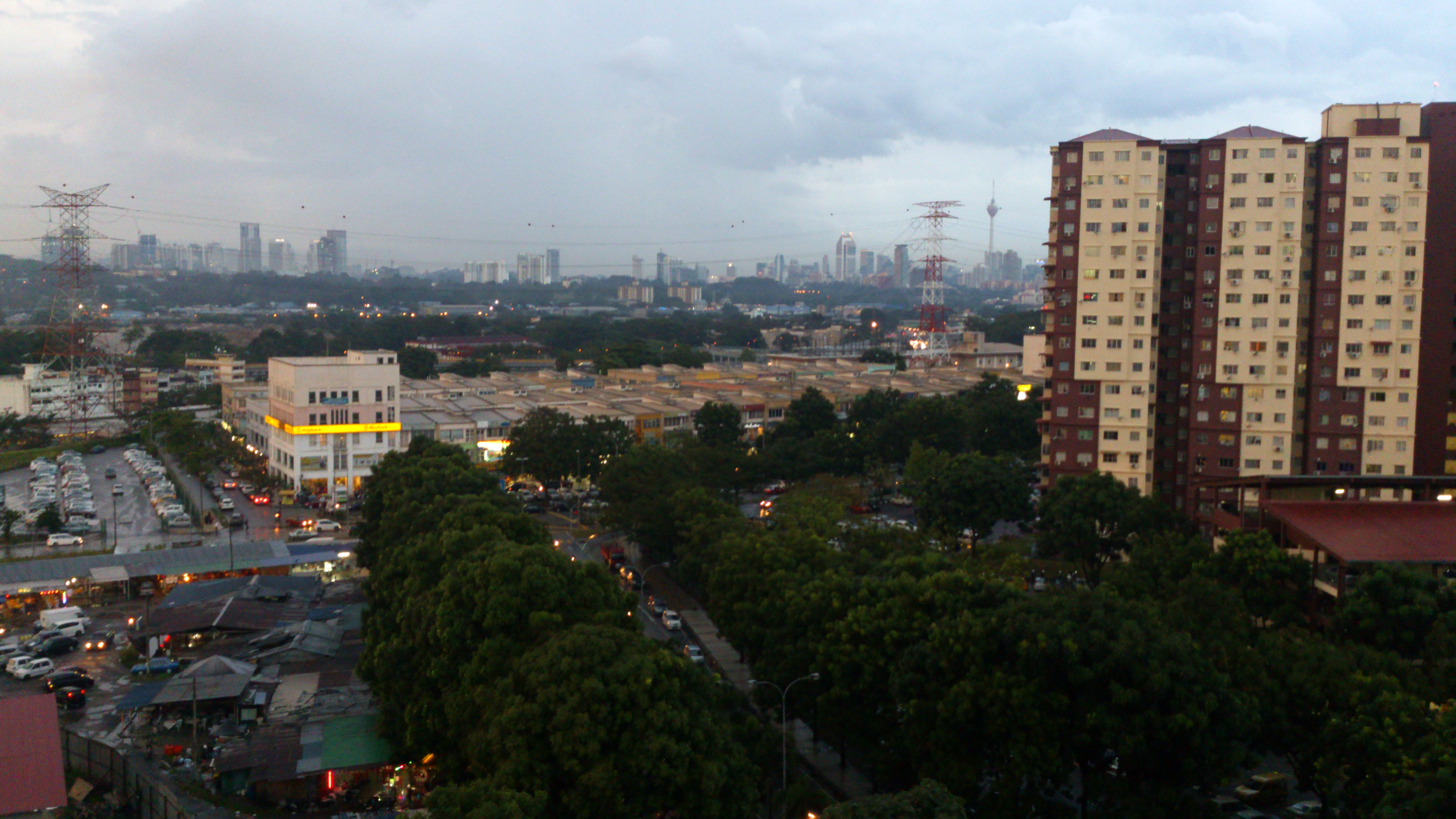
- Sri Permaisuri seen from Sri Penara Apartment. Seen at the background are Maybank Tower and KL Tower (right side) and Mid Valley City (left side).
- Nickname: Queensville
- Location within Malaysia
- Coordinates: 3°6′7″N 101°42′35″E
- Country: Malaysia
- State: Federal Territory of Kuala Lumpur
- Constituency: Cheras

Government
  - Local Authority: Kuala Lumpur City Hall
  - Mayor: Mhd Amin Nordin Abdul Aziz
- Time zone: UTC+8 (MST)
- Postcode: 56000
- Dialling code: +60 391
- Police: Salak Selatan

Sri Permaisuri is a township in Cheras, Kuala Lumpur, Malaysia. It is located near Bandar Tun Razak and Salak South. It was opened for residential housing in 2000. The major types of housing there are apartments and condominiums.

== History ==
Bandar Sri Permaisuri is a privatised joint venture between Dwitasik Sdn. Bhd as the developer, PPC Glomac Sdn. Bhd as Turnkey Contractor and Kuala Lumpur City Hall (Dewan Bandaraya Kuala Lumpur) (DBKL) as the land owner on a 220 acres (89 ha) site. It is developed as an integrated, self-contained residential, commercial and recreational township. The township was expected to cater to an estimated 70,000 people.

The development shares common boundaries with Cheras, Salak Selatan and Bandar Tun Razak. The area is also easily accessible via East–West Link Expressway, Kuala Lumpur–Seremban Expressway, Maju Expressway and Middle Ring Road II (MRRII). The township is divided 17 parcels; 10 residential and seven commercial parcels.

== Location ==
Sri Permaisuri is located in the south of Kuala Lumpur. It is surrounded by Taman Ikan Emas (north), Salak Selatan New Village (south-east), Taman Mulia (south) and Salak Selatan town (west).

== Facilities ==
=== Mosque ===
- Masjid Al Najihin – opened in 2009 with a capacity of 5,000 people.

=== Temple ===
- Cheras Kum Yum Tong (观音堂)

=== Educational Institutions ===
Few educational institutions are located at or within the vicinity of Sri Permaisuri. They are;

- Sekolah Menengah Sains Selangor
- SM Teknik Kuala Lumpur
- Institut Perguruan Teknik
- Institut Perguruan Guru Kampus Ilmu Khas
- SK Seri Tasik
- SMK Seri Tasik
- SMK Seri Permaisuri
- Eye Level Learning Centre Bandar Sri Permaisuri
- SMA Majlis Agama Islam Wilayah Persekutuan [SMA-MAIWP]
- Sekolah Menengah Integrasi Sains Tahfiz [SMISTA-MAIWP]
- First Note Music Studio
- Qminds Education Centre www.qminds.com.my

=== Sports and Recreational ===
Permaisuri Lake Gardens is one of the major attractions for jogger/runners from around Sri Permaisuri. The 40 ha garden features a lake, fountains and outdoor gyms. Also located by the lake is the Kuala Lumpur Football Association Stadium.

=== Health ===
Pusat Perubatan Universiti Kebangsaan Malaysia and Rehabilitation Hospital are located nearby on Jalan Yaacob Latif.

=== Shopping ===
A 412,000 square feet (38,300 m^{2}) mall; Queensville is being constructed in the township by Seal Inc Bhd. The mall is part of the development that includes serviced residences, flexible suites, an office tower and shoplots.

== Connectivity ==
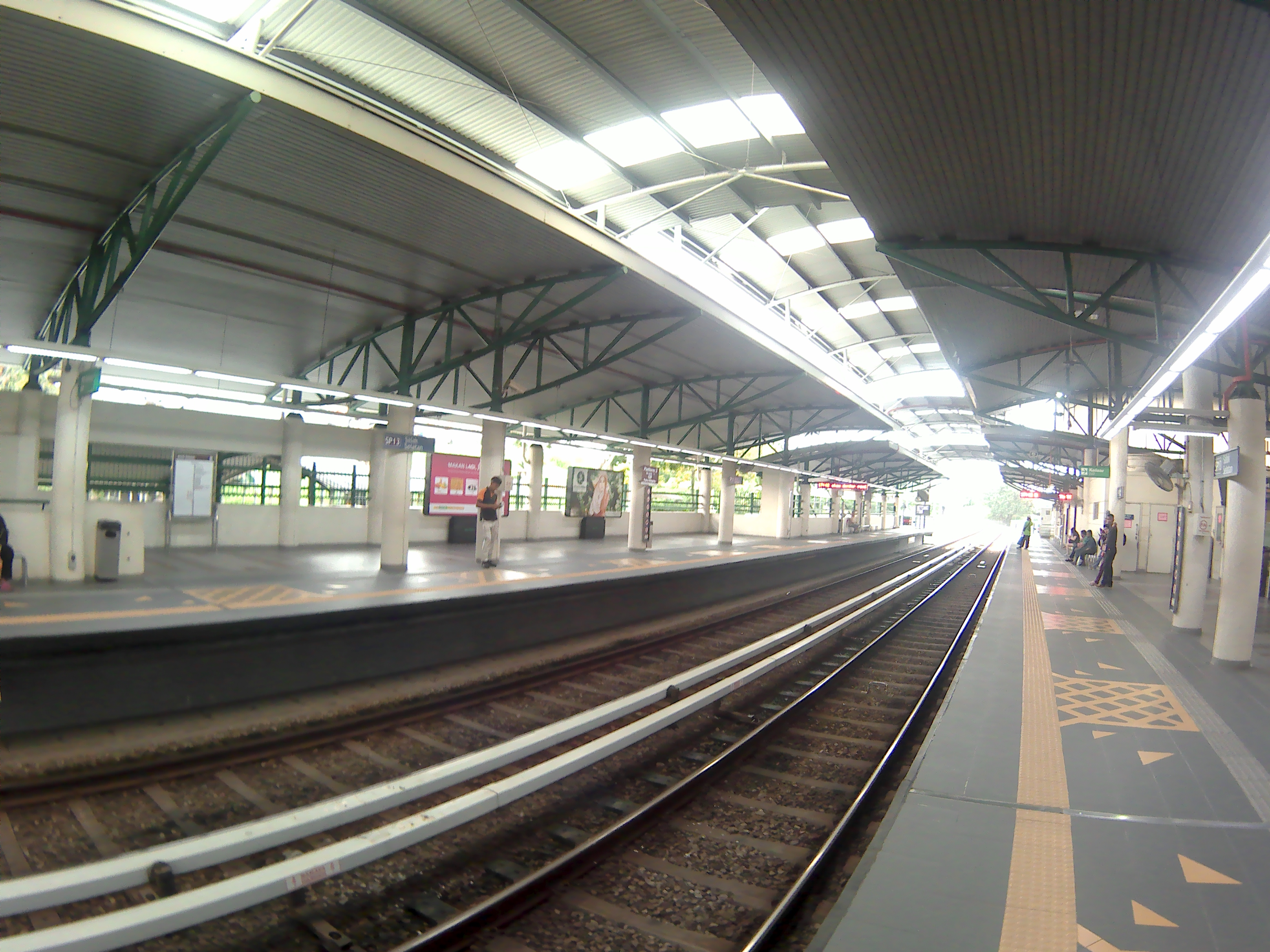
Salak Selatan LRT station's platforms towards the southeast.

=== LRT ===
Sri Permaisuri is well connected to the RapidKL LRT via Salak Selatan LRT station (planned future interchange with MRT Circle Line), Salak Selatan KTM Komuter station as well as to the Sungai Besi Expressway (BESRAYA), Kuala Lumpur-Putrajaya Highway and the East–West Link Expressway.

=== MRT ===
The district is planned to be served by the Sri Permaisuri MRT station in the future which will be part of the proposed MRT Circle Line.
