= Bandar Malaysia Selatan MRT station =

Railway station in Kuala Lumpur, Malaysia

Coordinates: 3°06′28.3″N 101°41′51.0″E

PY26 KT1A KB02A Bandar Malaysia Selatan

General information
- Location: Bandar Malaysia, Kuala Lumpur; Malaysia
- System: Future railway and Intermodal passenger transport station
- Owner: MRT Corp, Express Rail Link, Keretapi Tanah Melayu
- Lines: 1 Batu Caves–Pulau Sebang Line; 7 KLIA Transit (Express Rail Link); 12 Putrajaya Line; HSR KL-Singapore High Speed Rail (canceled); ETS KTM ETS
- Platforms: Island
- Tracks: 2 (KTM); 2 (SSP); 4 (ERL) ? (HSR)

Construction
- Structure type: Underground (SSP/PY)
- Depth: 21.2 metres (70 ft)
- Parking: Available

Other information
- Station code: PY26 KB02A KT1A

Services
| Preceding station | | Following station |
|---|---|---|
| Bandar Malaysia Utara towards Kwasa Damansara | Putrajaya Line (Future infill station) | Kuchai towards Putrajaya Sentral |
| Preceding station | Keretapi Tanah Melayu (Komuter) | Following station |
| Seputeh towards Batu Caves | Batu Caves–Pulau Sebang Line (Future infill station) | Salak Selatan towards Pulau Sebang/Tampin |
| Preceding station | Express Rail Link | Following station |
| Kuala Lumpur Sentral Terminus | KLIA Transit (Future infill station) | Bandar Tasik Selatan towards KLIA T2 |
KLIA Ekspres does not stop here
Location

The Bandar Malaysia railway station is a planned railway station and a high-speed rail terminus as part of the Bandar Malaysia project in the Salak Selatan district in southern Kuala Lumpur, Malaysia.

The station is planned to serve as a gateway to Kuala Lumpur with the proposed Kuala Lumpur–Singapore High Speed Rail from Singapore, as well as a secondary transport hub after KL Sentral, connecting KLIA Transit, KTM Komuter and the MRT Putrajaya Line. It will also primarily serve the southern half of Bandar Malaysia, with the north being served by Bandar Malaysia North. The station will be built at the site of Simpang Airport together with Bandar Malaysia North station and the rest of the Bandar Malaysia development.

== MRT Putrajaya Line station ==
The planned MRT station was provisionally named Bandar Malaysia Selatan that will serve the Putrajaya Line in the transport hub. While the MRT Putrajaya Line will begin full operations on 16 March 2023, the planned stations at Bandar Malaysia will not be included in the opening, following the cancellation of the Kuala Lumpur-Singapore high speed railway.

The station, along with the adjacent Bandar Malaysia Utara station, are currently mothballed as future infill stations; trains running between Chan Sow Lin and Kuchai will pass through Bandar Malaysia but will not stop here.
