= Bandar Tun Razak LRT station =

Metro station in Kuala Lumpur, Malaysia

SP14 Bandar Tun Razak

General information
- Other names: Malay: باندر تون رزاق (Jawi); Chinese: 敦拉萨镇; Tamil: பண்டார் துன் ரசாக்
- Location: Persiaran Ikhlas, Taman Mulia, Bandar Tun Razak; 57100 Kuala Lumpur; Malaysia
- Coordinates: 3°5′23″N 101°42′44″E
- System: Rapid KL
- Owner: Prasarana Malaysia
- Operator: Rapid Rail
- Line: 4 Sri Petaling Line
- Platforms: 2 side platforms
- Tracks: 2

Construction
- Structure type: Low-rise
- Parking: None

Other information
- Station code: SP14

History
- Opened: 11 July 1998; 28 years ago
- Former names: Mulia

Services
Preceding station		Following station
Salak Selatan towards Sentul Timur	Sri Petaling Line	Bandar Tasik Selatan towards Putra Heights
Location

The Bandar Tun Razak LRT station is a Malaysian low-rise light rapid transit (LRT) station situated near and named after the Kuala Lumpur township of Bandar Tun Razak. The station is part of the LRT Sri Petaling Line (formerly known as STAR LRT line).

The station was opened on 11 July 1998, as part of the second phase of the STAR system's opening, including 7 new stations along the Chan Sow Lin-Sri Petaling route. At that time, Bandar Tun Razak station was called "Mulia" station.

== Location ==
The LRT station is located between the western edge of Bandar Tun Razak and the Salak Expressway, situated on a steep slope that drops down from Persiaran Ikhlas onto the highway. Due to this precarious position, the station is only intended to serve the Bandar Tun Razak area via Persiaran Ikhlas (an inner road in the Sri Kota Flat complex of Bandar Tun Razak), as well as the neighbouring Taman Mulia and the southern fringe of Bandar Sri Permaisuri from the north

The station's sole entrance towards Bandar Tun Razak means other areas on the opposing side of the Salak Expressway, such as Kampung Baru Salak Selatan in Salak South and Desa Petaling are not directly linked to the LRT station.

== Design ==
The Bandar Tun Razak station was built on a sloped terrain, designed with a single subsurface ticket area and concourse facing Bandar Tun Razak and a platform level below. The station has a similar design to the Sri Petaling LRT station. The platform level consists of two side platforms along two tracks for trains travelling in opposite directions, while the concourse floorspace acts as a crossing between the tracks for access onto both platforms. Both levels are linked via stairways, escalators and special elevators for the disabled and wheelchairs users.

The styling of the station is similar to most other stations in the line, featuring curved roofs supported by latticed frames, and white plastered walls and pillars.

== See also ==
- Bandar Tun Razak
