= Bandar Malaysia Utara MRT station =

Metro station in Kuala Lumpur, Malaysia

PY25 Bandar Malaysia Utara

General information
- Location: Bandar Malaysia; 57100 Kuala Lumpur; Malaysia
- Coordinates: 3°6′58.36″N 101°42′10.76″E
- System: Rapid KL
- Owner: MRT Corp
- Operator: Rapid Rail
- Line: 12 Putrajaya Line
- Platforms: 1 island platform
- Tracks: 2

Construction
- Structure type: Underground
- Depth: 18 metres (59 ft)

Other information
- Station code: PY25

Services
Preceding station		Following station
Chan Sow Lin towards Kwasa Damansara	Putrajaya Line Future service	Bandar Malaysia Selatan towards Putrajaya Sentral
Location

The Bandar Malaysia Utara MRT station (Working name: Bandar Malaysia North) is a planned Mass Rapid Transit (MRT) underground station on the MRT Putrajaya Line. The station will serve the future development of Bandar Malaysia in Salak Selatan, Kuala Lumpur, Malaysia.

== Location and construction ==
The planned station is at the former site of Simpang Airport, close to the intersection of PLUS toll road and Jalan Istana (part of the Besraya toll road). It is one of two stations, the other being Bandar Malaysia Selatan, allocated for the Bandar Malaysia development.

While the Putrajaya Line is completed and started operations on 16 March 2023, this station along with Bandar Malaysia Utara were not included in the opening, following the mothballing of the Bandar Malaysia project and the cancellation of the Kuala Lumpur-Singapore high-speed rail project.
