= Salak Selatan station =

Salak Selatan station may refer to:

- Salak Selatan Komuter station, part of the Batu Caves-Pulau Sebang Line in Salak Selatan
- Salak Selatan LRT station, part of the LRT Sri Petaling Line in Salak Selatan
