= Permaisuri Lake Gardens =

Garden in Bandar Sri Permaisuri, Kuala Lumpur, Malaysia

- Taman Tasik Permaisuri
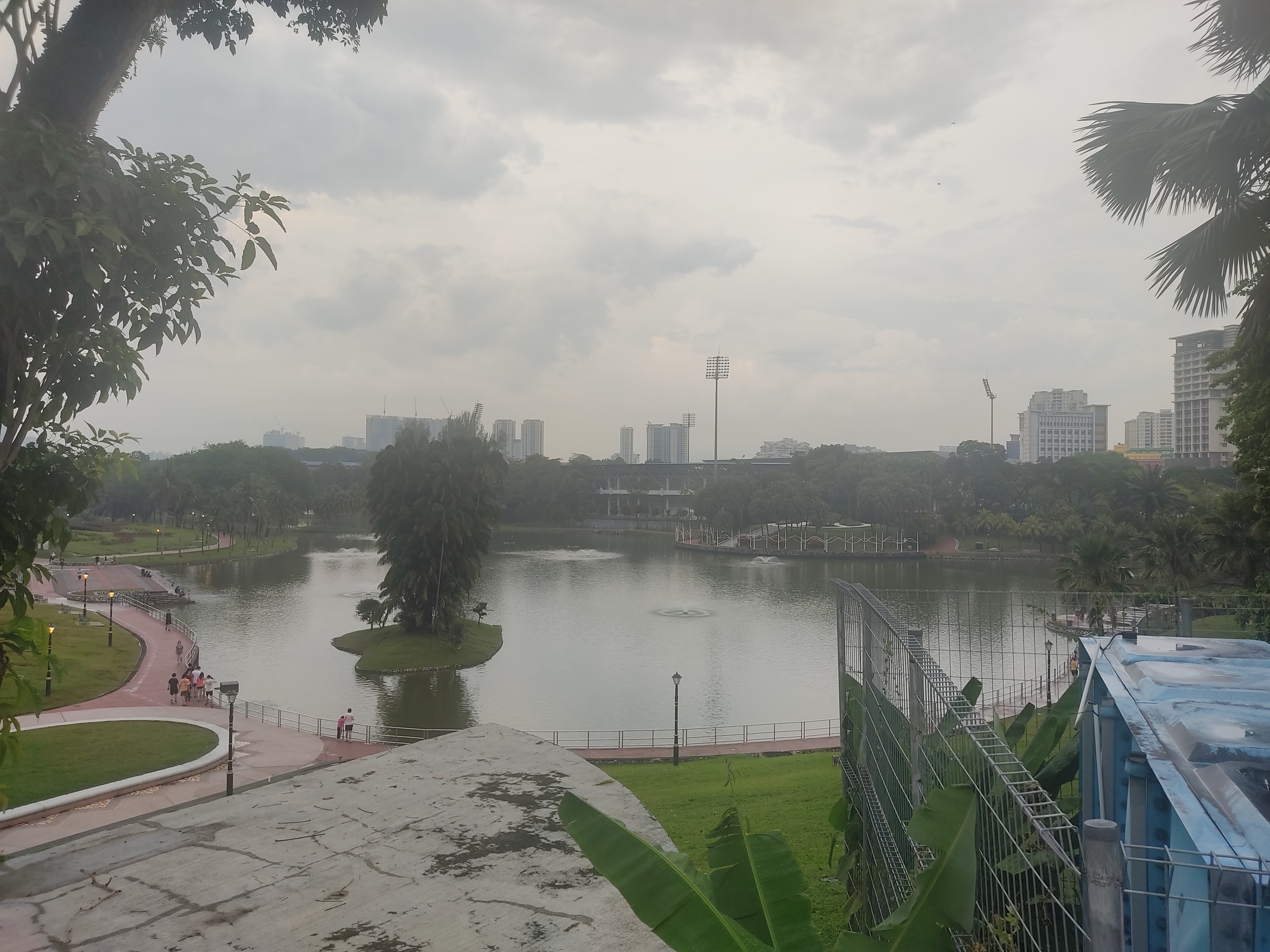
- View from Permaisuri Lake Gardens
- Interactive map of Permaisuri Lake Gardens
- Type: Urban park
- Location: Bandar Sri Permaisuri, Kuala Lumpur, Malaysia
- Coordinates: 3.0960°N 101.7197°E
- Area: 49.4 hectares (122 acres)
- Established: April 2, 1989

Permaisuri Lake Gardens (Malay: Taman Tasik Permaisuri) is an urban park in Bandar Sri Permaisuri, Kuala Lumpur, Malaysia.

== Description ==
The gardens feature a large central lake that was a byproduct of tin mining activities under British Rule. Later on, the area was cleaned up and developed into a park. Permaisuri Lake Gardens has an area of 49.4 hectares or 122 acres. It was officially opened by D.Y.M.M Sultanah Zanariah, D.K Raja Permaisuri Agong the 8th on April 2, 1989. This 49.4-hectare lake park was developed in 1984 and is located between Jalan Budiman and Jalan Tenteram, Cheras which is about 15 km from the city centre. It consists of a 14-acre lake with four small islands in it. One of the islands has two rain trees that are heavily used by several species of water birds for nesting. See https://ebird.org/checklist/S198182432 The surrounding area is planted with low trees and shrubs that not only beautify this garden but also serve as a place to shelter from the scorching sun. Its location close to Kuala Lumpur Swimming Complex, Kuala Lumpur Football Association Stadium, DBKL Sports Complex, International Youth Center, DBKL Equestrian Unit, Hospital Canselor Tuanku Muhriz UKM and Bandar Tun Razak Mosque has made it a popular focal point for visitors from inside and outside the city. The main attraction in this park is Laman Iskandar Puteri which is located on a corner of 2 hectares. It is characterized by the Traditional Malay Royal Garden, planted with flowers and equipped with rhythmic water fountains, betel nut-shaped water fountains and an outdoor gym. The park is open from 6.00 am to 8.00 pm every day.

== Architecture ==
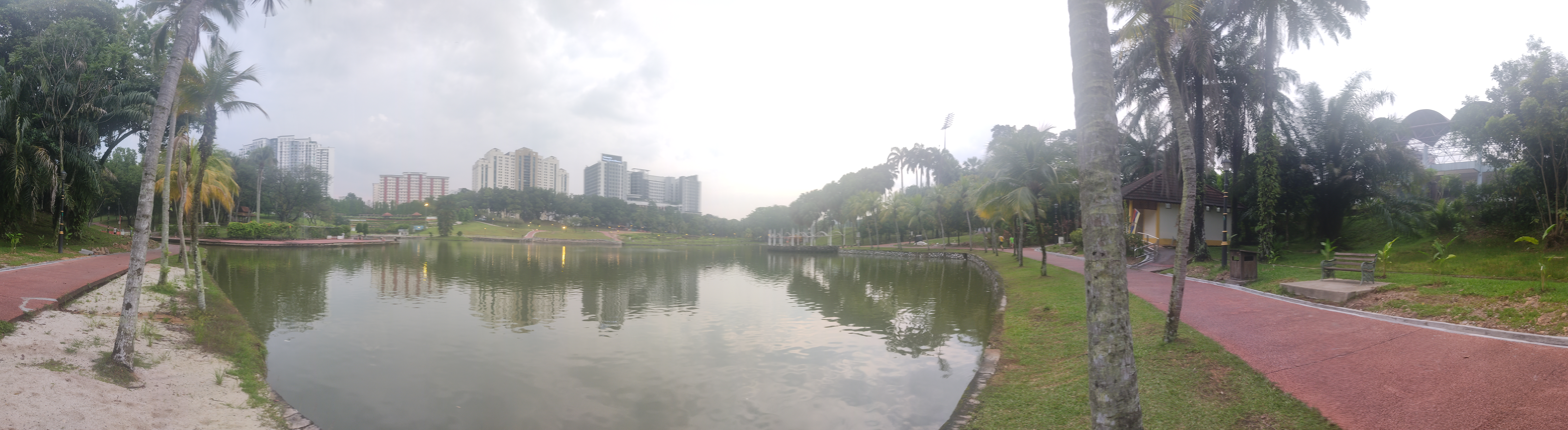
Panorama view of Permaisuri Lake Gardens in 2022

The park spreads across an area of 49.4 hectares (122 acres) with a 5.67-hectare (14.0-acre) of lake. The lake garden has facilities such as a jogging track, cycling track, garden etc.

== Transport ==
The lake garden is accessible via GO KL City Bus Grey Line or MRT Feeder Bus T401, T402 from both Salak Selatan LRT station (1.7km distance) and Taman Midah MRT station (2.4km distance) .

== See also ==
- List of tourist attractions in Kuala Lumpur
- Mining in Malaysia
