= Transport in Malaysia =

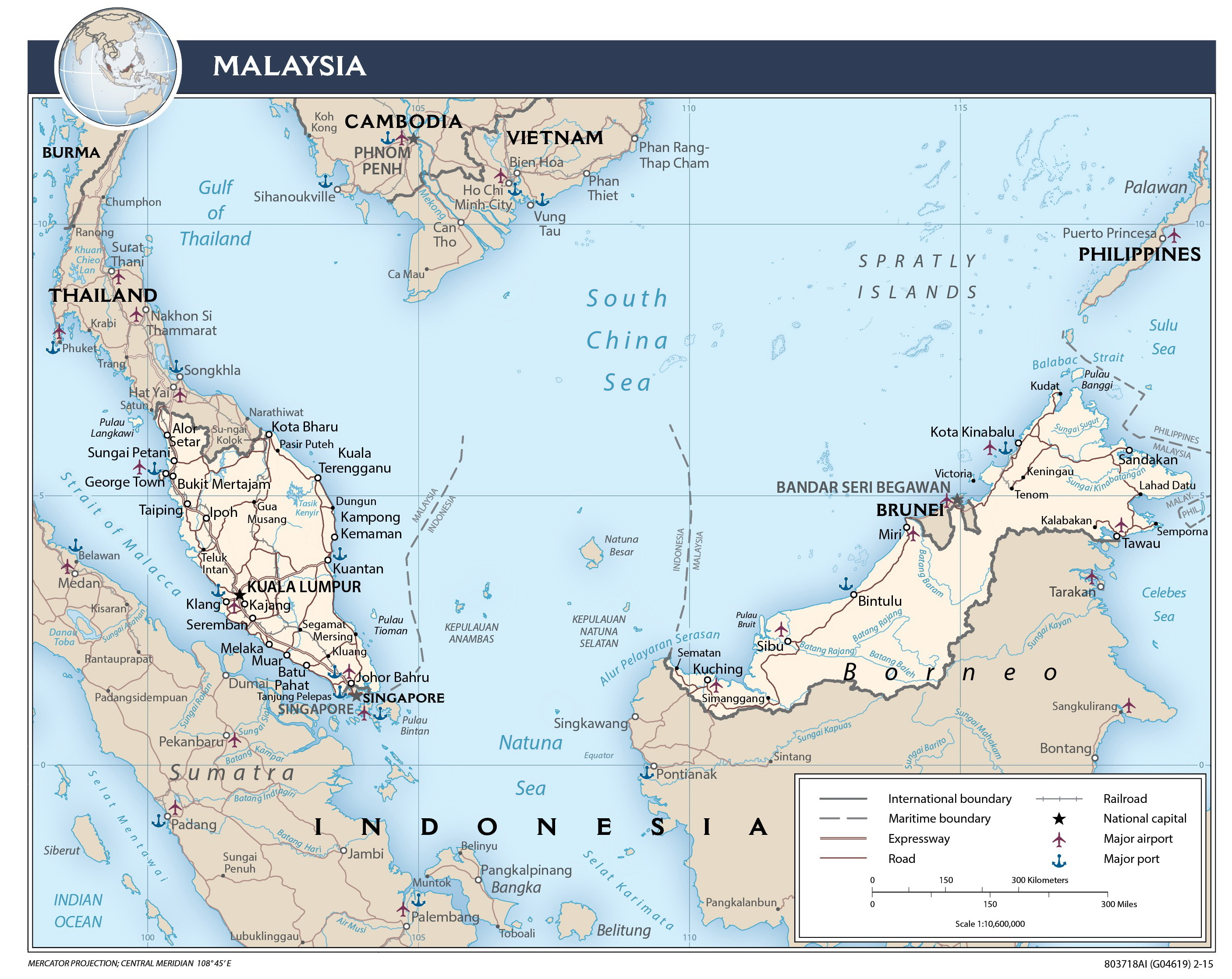
A map showing Malaysia's transportation network

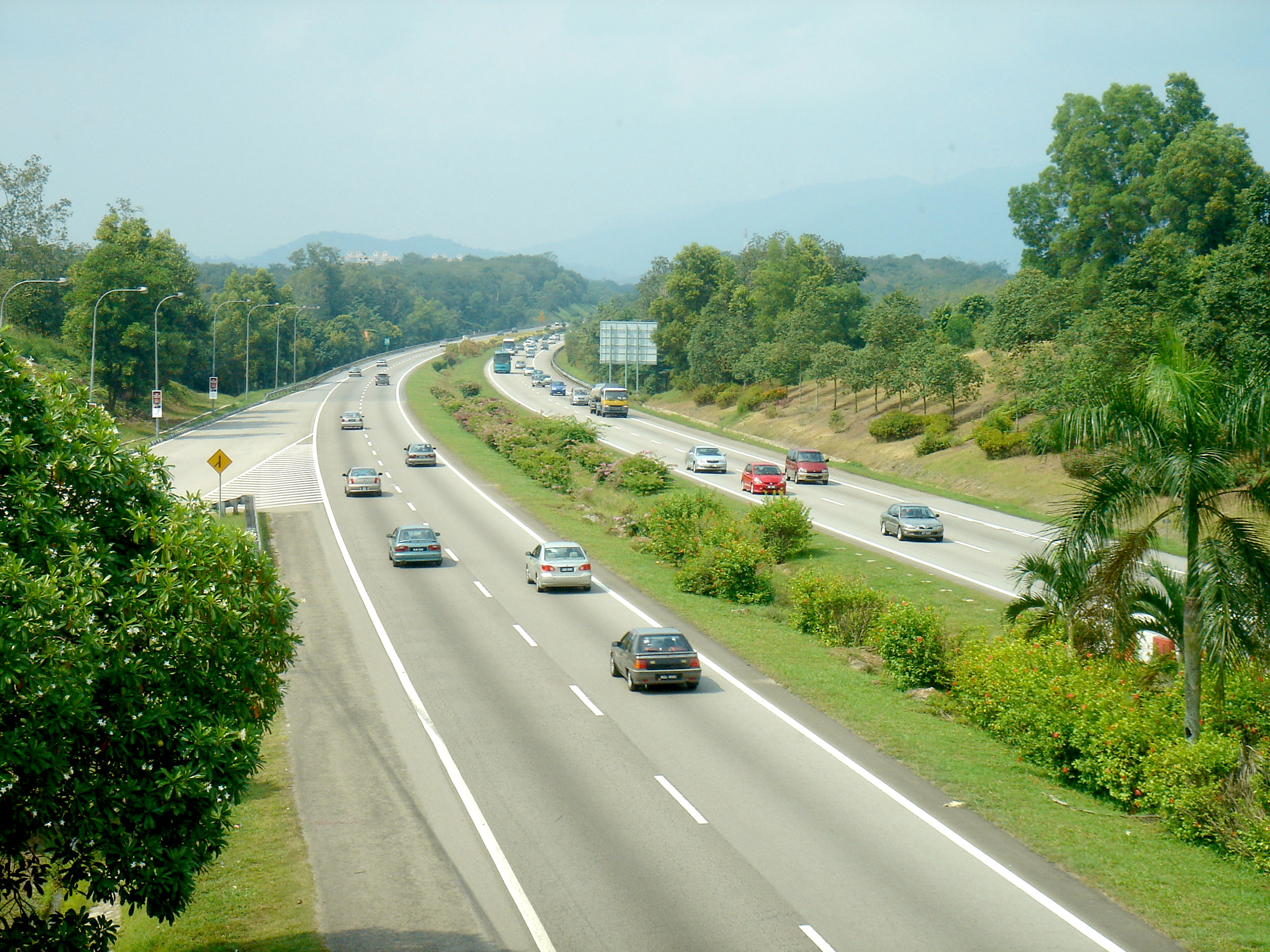
The 966 km North–South Expressway, which runs through seven states in Peninsular Malaysia, is the longest expressway in Malaysia.

Transportation in Malaysia started to develop during British colonial rule, and the country's transport network is now diverse and developed. Malaysia's road network is extensive, covering 290,099.38 kilometres, including 2,016.05 km of expressways (in 2021). The main highway of the country extends over 800 km, reaching the Thai border and Singapore. Peninsular Malaysia has an extensive road network, whilst the road system in East Malaysia is not as well-developed. The main modes of transport in Peninsular Malaysia include buses, trains, cars and to an extent, commercial travel on airplanes.

Malaysia has six international airports, and two container ports ranked among the top 20 busiest in the world. The official airline of Malaysia is Malaysia Airlines, providing international and domestic air service alongside two other carriers. Most of the major cities are connected by air routes. The railway system is state-run, and covers a total of 1,849 km. Popular within the cities are commuter rail and rapid transit, which reduces the traffic load on other systems, and is considered safe, comfortable and reliable. Public transportation is more developed in Malaysia than in some of the other Southeast Asian countries.

== Land ==
=== Roads ===
Malaysia's road network covers 290,099.38 kilometres (180,259 mi), of which 288,083.33 kilometres (179,006.68 mi) is paved/unpaved roads, and2,016.05 kilometres (1,252.72 mi) is expressways. The longest highway of the country, the North–South Expressway, extends over 800 kilometres (500 mi) between the Thai border and Singapore. The Second longest highway is East-Coast Highway (LPT-E8) Spanning almost 500 km from Kuala Lumpur to state capital of Terengganu, Kuala Terengganu. The road systems in Sabah and Sarawak are less developed and of lower quality in comparison to that of Peninsular Malaysia. Recently, the construction of Pan-Borneo Highway is approved under 2015 Malaysian Budget. The highway project spans 1,663 km (936 km in Sarawak, 727 km in Sabah) mostly mirror the existing trunk road, and it involves the widening of the present three-metre-wide single-carriageway into a dual-carriageway. Driving on the left has been compulsory since the introduction of motor vehicles in Federated Malay States in 1903 during British colonial era. It is estimated that 9,432,023 passenger cars are actively using this road network in 2018.

Railway network in peninsular Malaysia

=== Railways ===
The railway system is state-run, and covers a total of 1,849 kilometres (1,149 mi). Most of the railway lines are consisted of ballasted setup, along with concrete sleepers, which serves better in wet and humid tropical condition, compared to wooden sleepers which can rot over time. As early as 1980s, due to the need for local suppliers of such products, a few local Malaysian rail manufacturing companies had been formed by collaboration with foreign technology partners.

1,792 kilometres (1,113 mi) of it is metre gauge, while 199.5 kilometres (124 mi) is standard gauge. Seven hundred and sixty-seven kilometres of metre gauge tracks and all of the standard gauge tracks are electrified. Intra-city travel is through relatively inexpensive rapid transit systems. Commuter rail and electric train service are available for most major only Kuala Lumpur and its neighbouring states, development of such efficient transportation have not been made in other states that really needs them. Malaysia already approved its first Kuala Lumpur–Singapore High Speed Rail project spanning 375 km between Kuala Lumpur and Singapore. This rapid development had spurred growth of local Malaysian rail service Companies which cater to these niche needs.

== Air ==
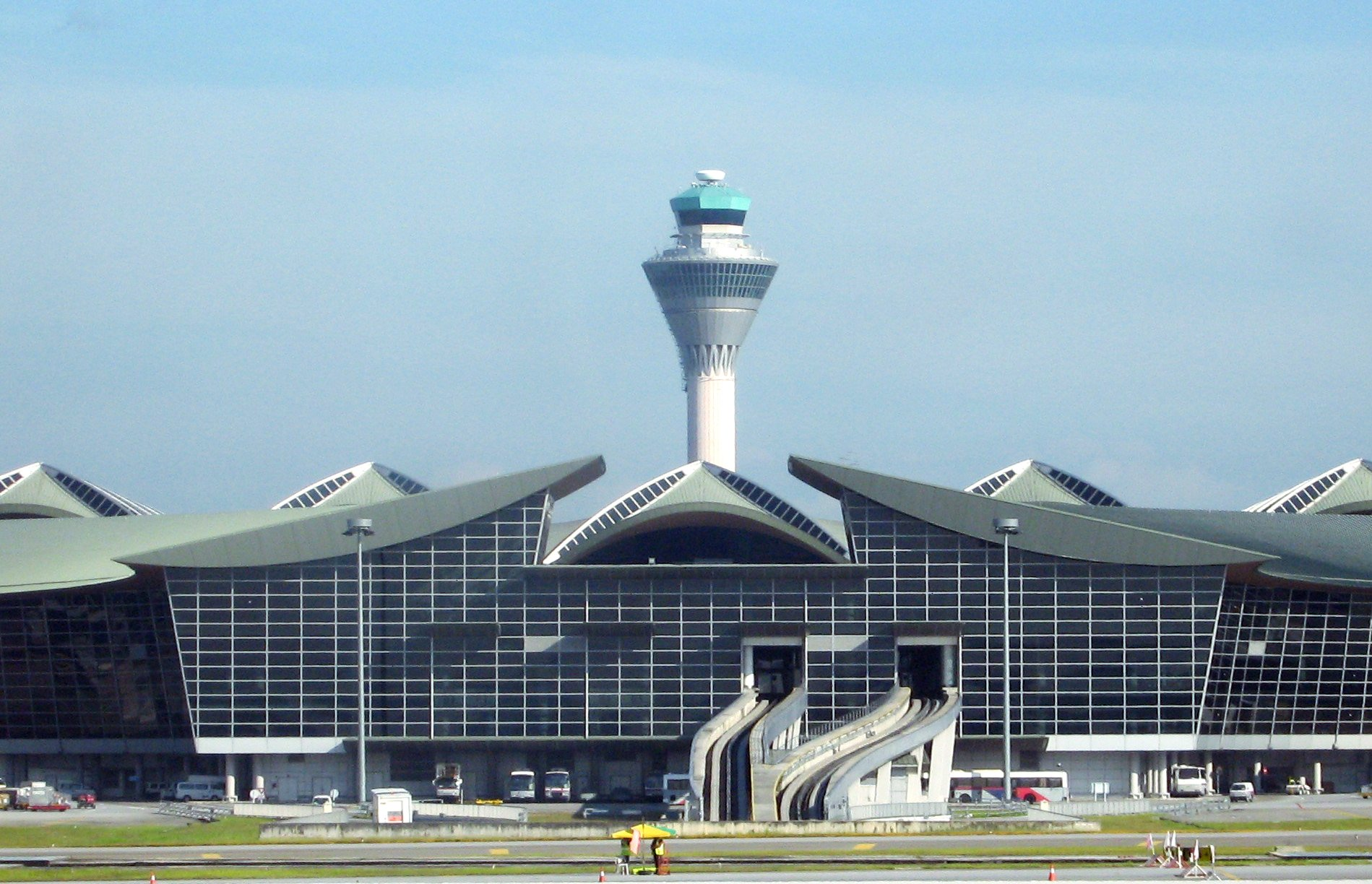
KLIA is the main international airport in Malaysia.

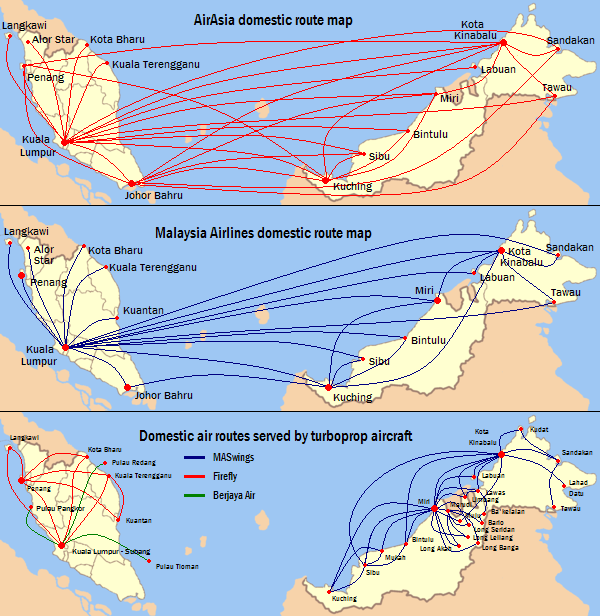
Air transport route maps in Malaysia.

Malaysia has 62 airports, of which 38 are paved. Malaysia Airlines, as the national carrier, offers extensive international and domestic routes. Major international routes and domestic routes crossing between West Malaysia and East Malaysia are served by Malaysia Airlines, AirAsia, Firefly, and Batik Air Malaysia while smaller domestic and regional routes are supplemented by smaller airlines like AirBorneo, Firefly and SKS Airways. Cargo airlines such as MASkargo, Teleport, World Cargo Airlines, Kargo Xpress, and Raya Airways play a crucial role in enhancing connectivity between West and East Malaysia and Malaysia to the world.

=== Airports ===
Kuala Lumpur International Airport is the primary and busiest airport in Malaysia. In 2018, it was the world's 12th-busiest airport by international passenger traffic, recording over 43.5 million international passenger traffic. Other major airports include Kota Kinabalu International Airport, which is also Malaysia's second-busiest airport and busiest airport in East Malaysia with over 8.6 million passengers in 2018, and Penang International Airport, which serves Malaysia's second-largest urban area, with over 7.99 million passengers in 2018.

=== Airports with paved runways ===
total: 38
over 3,047 m: 5
2,438 to 3,047 m: 7
1,524 to 2,437 m: 10
914 to 1,523 m: 9
under 914 m: 7 (2004 est.)

=== Heliports ===
2 (2006 est.)

=== Airlines ===
National airline:

- Malaysia Airlines

Other airline:

- List of airlines of Malaysia

== Waterways ==
Malaysia has 7,200 kilometres (4,474 mi) of waterways, most of them rivers. Of this, 3,200 kilometres (2,000 mi) are in Peninsular Malaysia, 1,500 kilometres (930 mi) are in Sabah, and 2,500 kilometres (1,600 mi) are in Sarawak.

=== Ports and harbours ===
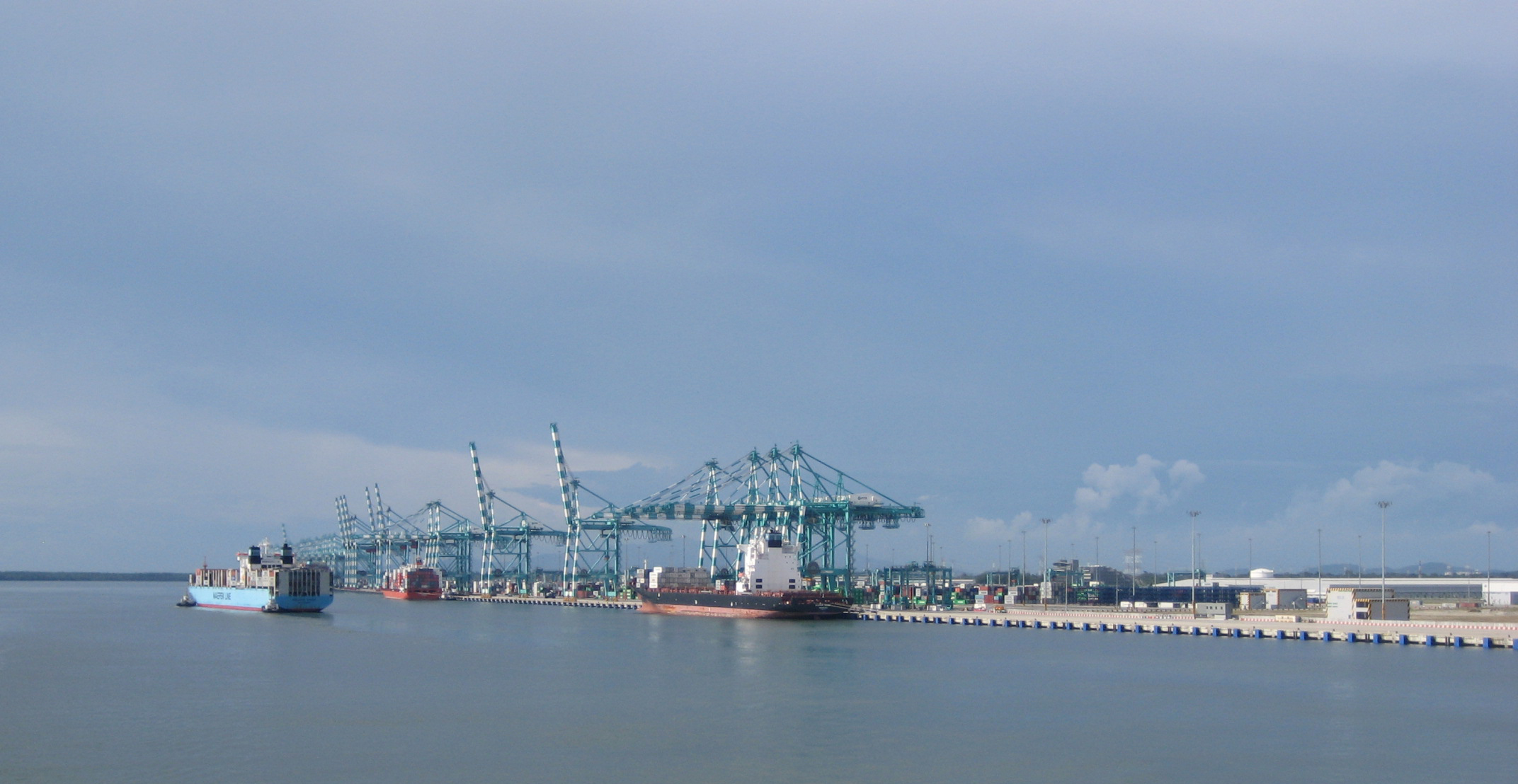
Port of Tanjung Pelepas in Johor, the 15th busiest port in the world and the fifth most efficient globally.

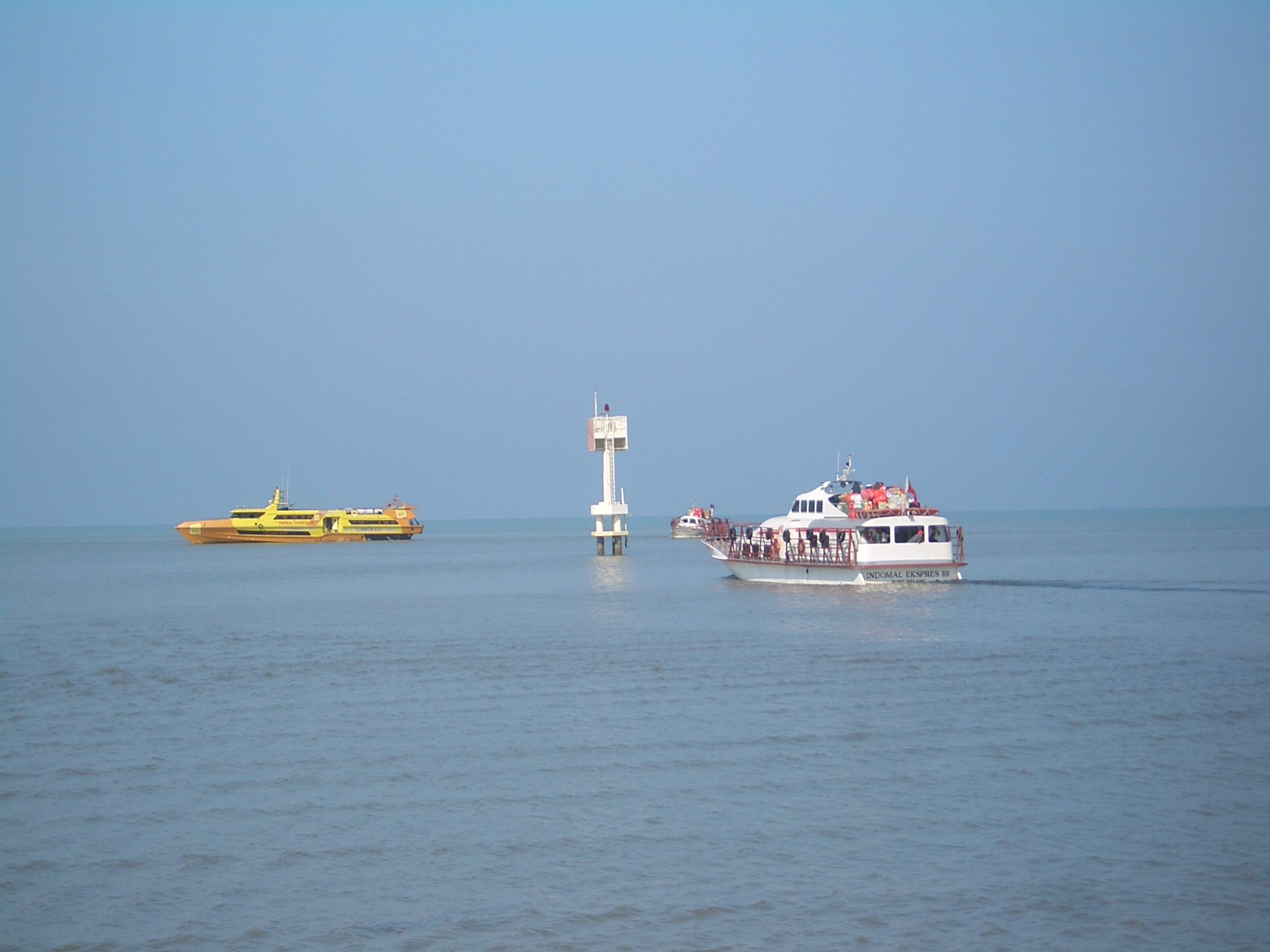
Shuttle boats ferry to the Malacca-Sumatra ferry (the big yellow boat) anchored offshore near Malacca.

Malaysia is strategically located on the Strait of Malacca, one of the most important shipping lanes in the world. Malaysia has two ports that are listed in the top 20 busiest ports in the world, Port Klang and Port of Tanjung Pelepas, which are, respectively, the second- and third-busiest ports in Southeast Asia after the Port of Singapore. Port Klang is Malaysia's busiest port, and the thirteenth-busiest port in the world in 2013, handling over 10.3 million TEUs. Port of Tanjung Pelepas (PTP) is Malaysia's second-busiest port and the largest transshipment hub, and the 15th busiest port in the world in 2023, handling over 11 million TEUs. PTP is also the most efficient port in Malaysia and ranked fifth in the world.

This is a list of Malaysian ports and harbours:

- Bintulu
- Kota Kinabalu
- Kuantan
- Kemaman
- Kuching
- Kudat
- Labuan
- Lahad Datu
- Lumut
- Miri
- Pasir Gudang
- Penang
- Port Dickson
- Port Klang
- Sandakan
- Sibu
- Tanjung Berhala
- Tanjung Kidurong
- Tawau
- Tanjung Pelepas
- Tanjung Langsat
- Kuala Kedah
- Kuala Perlis

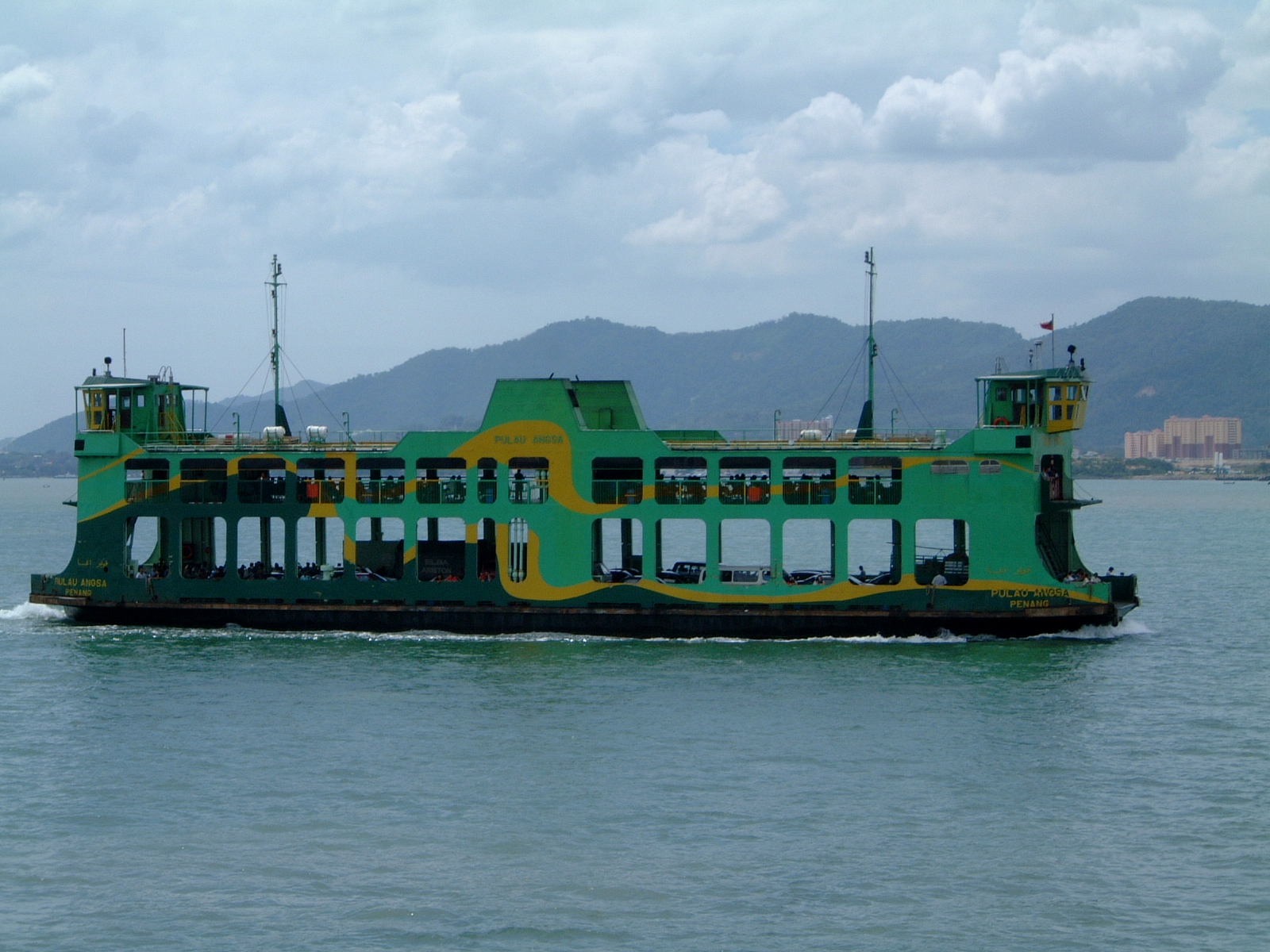
A ferry underway in Penang, Malaysia

=== Ferry ===
- Penang ferry service, Pulau Pinang
- Langkawi Ferry Service, Kedah
- Pangkor Ferry Service, Perak
- Tioman Ferry Service, Terengganu
- Labuan Ferry service, Labuan
- Tawau Ferry service, Sabah
- Miri Ferry service, Sarawak
- Sandakan Ferry service, Sabah
- Pasir Kelang Ferry service, Kelantan

=== Merchant Marine ===
Total: 360 ships (1,000 GT or over) 5,389,397 GT/7,539,178 tonnes deadweight (DWT) by type: bulk 59, cargo 100, chemical tanker 38, container 66, liquefied gas 25, livestock carrier 1, passenger 2, petroleum tanker 56, roll on/roll off 5, vehicle carrier 8

Foreign-owned: China 1, Germany 2, Hong Kong 8, Indonesia 2, Japan 2, South Korea 1, Liberia 1, Monaco 1, Norway 1, Philippines 2, Singapore 81, Vietnam 1
registered in other countries: 75 (2009 est.)

=== Pipelines ===
Malaysia has 3 kilometres (2 mi) of condensate pipeline, 1,965 kilometres (1,221 mi) of gas pipeline, 31 kilometres (19 mi) of oil pipeline, and 114 kilometres (71 mi) of refined products pipelines.

== See also ==
- List of airports in Malaysia
- Kuala Lumpur–Singapore High Speed Rail
- Public transport in Kuala Lumpur
- Transportation in Kuala Lumpur
- Plug-in electric vehicles in Malaysia

Regulation:

- Road signs in Malaysia
- Puspakom, vehicle inspection
- Vehicle registration plates of Malaysia
