= Sunway =

Sunway may refer to:

== Places ==
- Bandar Sunway, also called Sunway or Sunway City, a township in Petaling Jaya, Selangor, Malaysia

== Brands and enterprises ==
- Sunway (processor), a series of Chinese computer microprocessors
- Sunway Group, a Malaysian conglomerate
- Sunway Lagoon, a theme park in Bandar Sunway
- Sunway Pyramid, a shopping mall in Bandar Sunway
- Sunway Putra Mall, previously known as The Mall or Putra Place, a shopping mall located along Jalan Putra in Kuala Lumpur, Malaysia
- Sunway Velocity Mall, connected to Cochrane MRT station by a 198-metre bridge

== Transportation ==
- BRT Sunway Line, a bus rapid transit (BRT) line that is part of the Klang Valley Integrated Transit System
- Sunway Lagoon BRT station, serves the Sunway Lagoon in Bandar Sunway, on the BRT Sunway Line
- Sunway Monorail, in Malaysia
