= Monorail Suspension Bridge =

Monorail Suspension Bridge Jambatan Gantung Monorel
- Coordinates: 2°54′58″N 101°40′45″E
- Carries: Monorail
- Crosses: Putrajaya Lake
- Locale: Putrajaya Monorail
- Official name: Monorail Suspension Bridge
- Maintained by: Perbadanan Putrajaya

Characteristics
- Design: monorail suspension bridge
- Total length: 240 m
- Width: 10 m

History
- Constructed by: Perbadanan Putrajaya
- Opened: 2003

Location
- Interactive map of Monorail Suspension Bridge

The Monorail Suspension Bridge is one of the many bridges in Putrajaya, Malaysia. It was built to link several important landmarks in the Putrajaya area like the Putrajaya Convention Centre, Putra Mosque and the Government Administrative Complex in Parcel E. The bridge's main span has a length of approximately 240 metres and width of 10 metres. It is owned by Putrajaya Holdings Sdn. Bhd. and was designed by PJS International Sdn. Bhd.

The project halted in 2004 because the government had not approved further funding. The stalled project has often been described as the missing link of the public transport system designed for the federal administrative capital. The Ministry of the Federal Territories instructed the Putrajaya Corporation to appoint an independent consultant to conduct a study on the project's viability.

In September 2025, a plan to convert the bridge into a pedestrian walkway and cycling path starting January 2026 is underway.

== See also ==
- Putrajaya Monorail
