= Putrajaya Monorail =

Incomplete monorail system in Putrajaya, Malaysia

Putrajaya Monorail Line
- 14
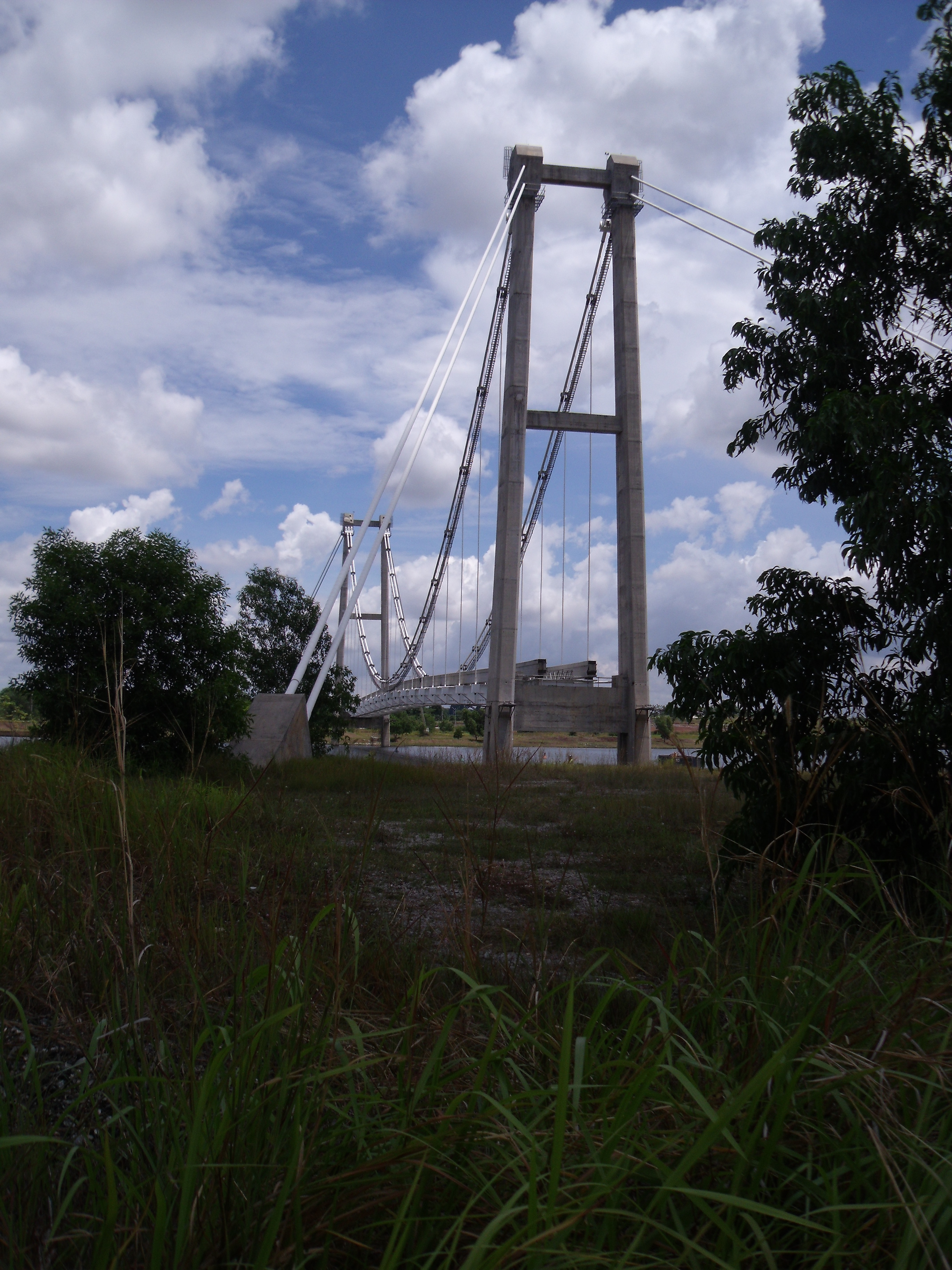
- The Monorail Suspension Bridge in Putrajaya since 2004

Overview
- Native name: Laluan Monorel Putrajaya
- Status: Shelved in 2004 due to federal budget constraints. (Determined unviable in 2026)
- Line number: 14
- Termini: Putrajaya Sentral; Kajang & Cyberjaya
- Stations: 25 stations

Service
- Type: Straddle-beam single rail track monorail
- Rolling stock: TBD
- Daily ridership: Not Available
- Ridership: Not Available

History
- Planned opening: TBD
- Opened: TBD
- Last extension: TBD

Technical
- Line length: 18 km (11 mi); Line 1: 13.2 km (8.2 mi); Line 2: 6.8 km (4.2 mi)
- Electrification: 750 V DC Third rail
- Conduction system: TBD
- Operating speed: 100 km/h (62mph)

The Putrajaya Monorail is an incomplete monorail system in Putrajaya, Malaysia. Construction has been stalled since 2004, and while revivals have been proposed periodically, as of 2026, the government confirmed there are no plans to revive the project due to feasibility constraints.

Putrajaya was originally planned to include a light rail system, but plans were changed, and a monorail plan was selected instead, after the construction of tunnels for aforementioned system began. It called for two sublines; Line 1, which is a 12 km (7.5 mi) monorail route with 17 stations and Line 2, which is a 6 km (3.7 mi) monorail route with 6 stations. In 2019, the government proposed a new light rapid transit (LRT) system may be built to revive the incomplete monorail project.

The monorail will include the Monorail Suspension Bridge, currently incomplete, and the Putra Bridge.

The monorail line would allow transfers to the existing KLIA Transit, connecting to Kuala Lumpur and Kuala Lumpur International Airport, and the now opened MRT Putrajaya line at Putrajaya Sentral station. The project originally cost RM400 million.

== Project Status ==
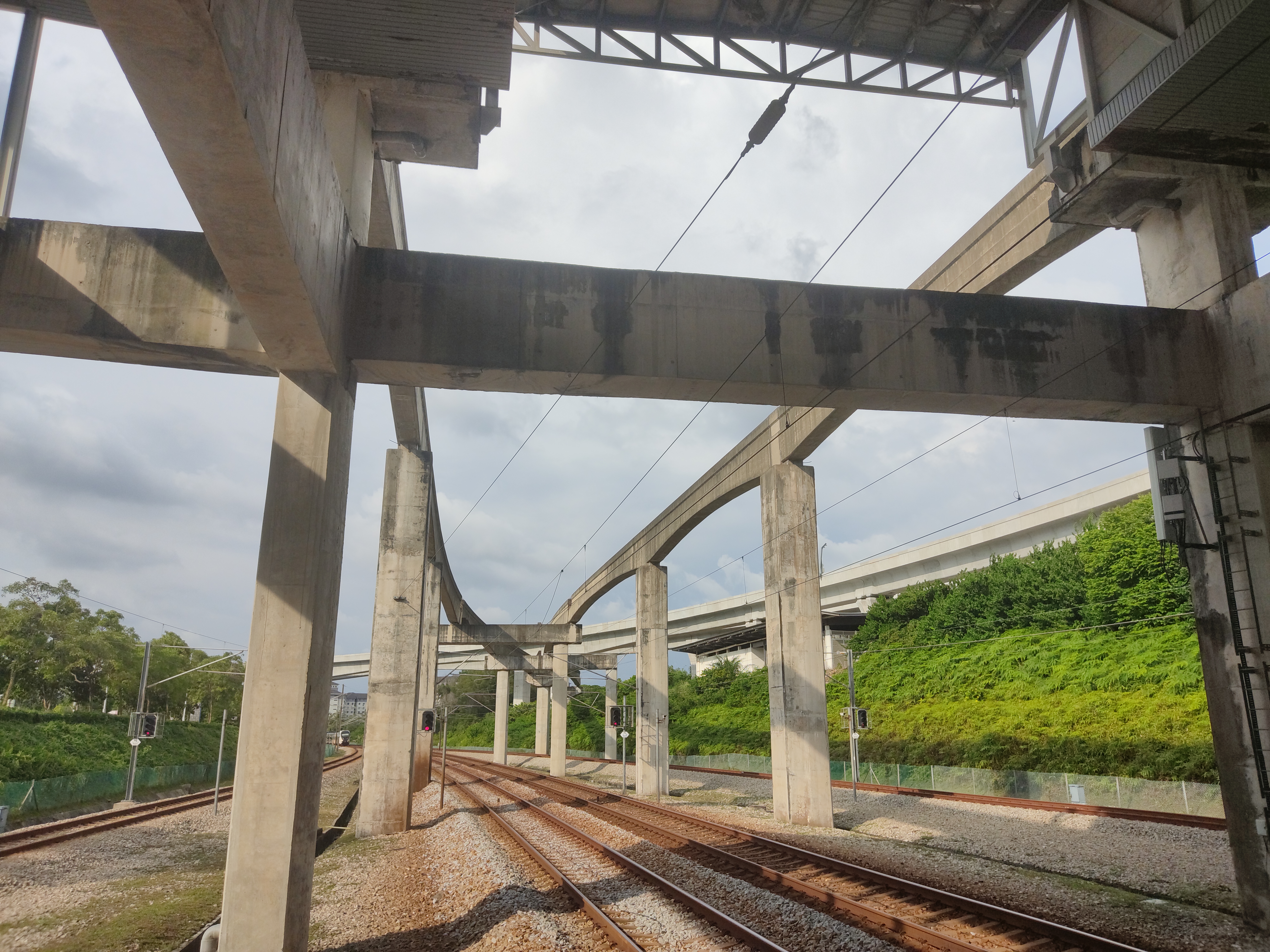
Monorail tracks with newly-built MRT elevated track

Construction was halted in 2004; 22 years ago, and will probably resume as the city becomes more populated.

In 2016, the MMC Corporation Berhad (MMC) submitted a proposal to the Economic Council (EC) to revive the stalled monorail project. The Land Public Transport Commission (SPAD) was due to conduct a feasibility study for monorail and tram services for both Putrajaya and Cyberjaya.

In October 2020, the government announced it had opened a request for proposals process to complete the project, within three months. As of 2021, the RFP has not yet opened.

In June 2023, the Ministry of Transport confirmed that the government is not planning to revive the project.

In July 2026, the Ministry of Transport reported in a written Parliamentary reply that resuming the abandoned monorail project was no longer viable based on findings from the Public Transport Study in Putrajaya, Cyberjaya, Bangi, and Kajang. The ministry cited the degraded condition of the 22-year-old abandoned infrastructure, including underground tunnels requiring complex structural integrity testing, making revival unfeasible compared to road-based mobility solutions such as Nadi Putra buses and Rapid On-Demand (ROD) van services.

== Putrajaya Tram Proposal ==
In February 2016, the Federal Territories Ministry proposed a tram network as a lower-cost alternative to completing the stalled monorail project. Under the oversight of the Economic Council, a light rail or tram alignment was evaluated to connect key administrative precincts with neighbouring urban centres, including Bangi, Kajang, and Cyberjaya.

Following further review, the Land Public Transport Commission (SPAD) announced plans during its 2017 annual review to call tenders for a tram alignment linking Putrajaya to Bangi, citing lower capital and operational expenditure compared to heavy urban rail. The planned first phase prioritised the corridor between Putrajaya and Bangi due to existing wide road rights-of-way, which allowed street-running tracks to share road infrastructure without extensive structural modifications.

The proposed tram system was intended to integrate regional transit hubs, providing transfers to the MRT Kajang Line at Kajang, the MRT Putrajaya Line and KLIA Transit at Putrajaya Sentral, and a planned stop serving the proposed Kuala Lumpur–Singapore high-speed rail at Kampung Abu Bakar Baginda.

Proposed route for the Putrajaya monorail as of 2022.

== See also ==
- Monorails in Malaysia
