= Sunway Monorail =

Monorail system in Sunway City, Malaysia

Overview
- Locale: Sunway City, Subang Jaya, Selangor, Malaysia
- Transit type: straddle-beam monorail (Steel-tracked)
- Number of lines: 1 loop line; 1 branch line
- Number of stations: 3

Operation
- Began operation: 2000
- Ended operation: Defunct as of 2007
- Number of vehicles: 2 trains

Technical
- System length: 3.2 km

The Sunway Monorail, alternately SunTrek 2000 was a Malaysian monorail system that operated within the vicinity of Sunway City, Subang Jaya, Selangor, west from the country's capital city, Kuala Lumpur. The system included a single looped line with three stations around Sunway City, and was the second monorail system to operate in Malaysia following the Genting Monorail, and the first public monorail in the country, opening in 2000 and predating the launch of the Kuala Lumpur Monorail by three years.

== Line and rolling stock ==
The monorail primarily ran along a 3 km steel-tracked loop system surrounding the Sunway Lagoon water theme park, stopping at three key locations on the northern and western side of the loop:

- Sunway Pyramid East monorail station - One station east of the Sunway Pyramid shopping centre.
- Sunway Pyramid west monorail station - One station west of Sunway Pyramid, currently within the site of the shopping Centre's 2006-2007 extension. Now has been refurbished to Johnny Rockets a franchise hamburger restaurants.
- Sunway College monorail station - One station east former name of Sunway University and a Malaysian campus of Monash University, both of which are situated side-by-side.
- Additionally, a branch line extends 600m west towards the monorail system's depot from the loop.

The monorail system operated with two five-car SL5 trains in its rolling stock; the trains produced by Severn-Lamb, a British locomotive manufacturer. The total cost of the loop was an estimated US$10 million.

== Expansions, closure and potential revivals ==
The Sunway Monorail system was intended to support additional extensions in the following years. Plans were made to construct two addition loops with interconnecting stations at all three loops, but none of the plans were realised.

The system ceased operation within years following its opening. Despite its closure, portions of tracks along the line, as well as its depot, remain.

In 2007 there were unconfirmed reports on plans regarding a potential revival of the monorail link, additionally connecting to the KTM Komuter's Setia Jaya station (proposed to be renamed Sunway station).

The system was later on modified as a walkway connecting various universities around the area, as well as being incorporated into the currently in operation BRT Sunway Line, which connects Port Klang Line's Setia Jaya station to the Kelana Jaya Line's USJ7 station via Bandar Sunway.

== Gallery ==
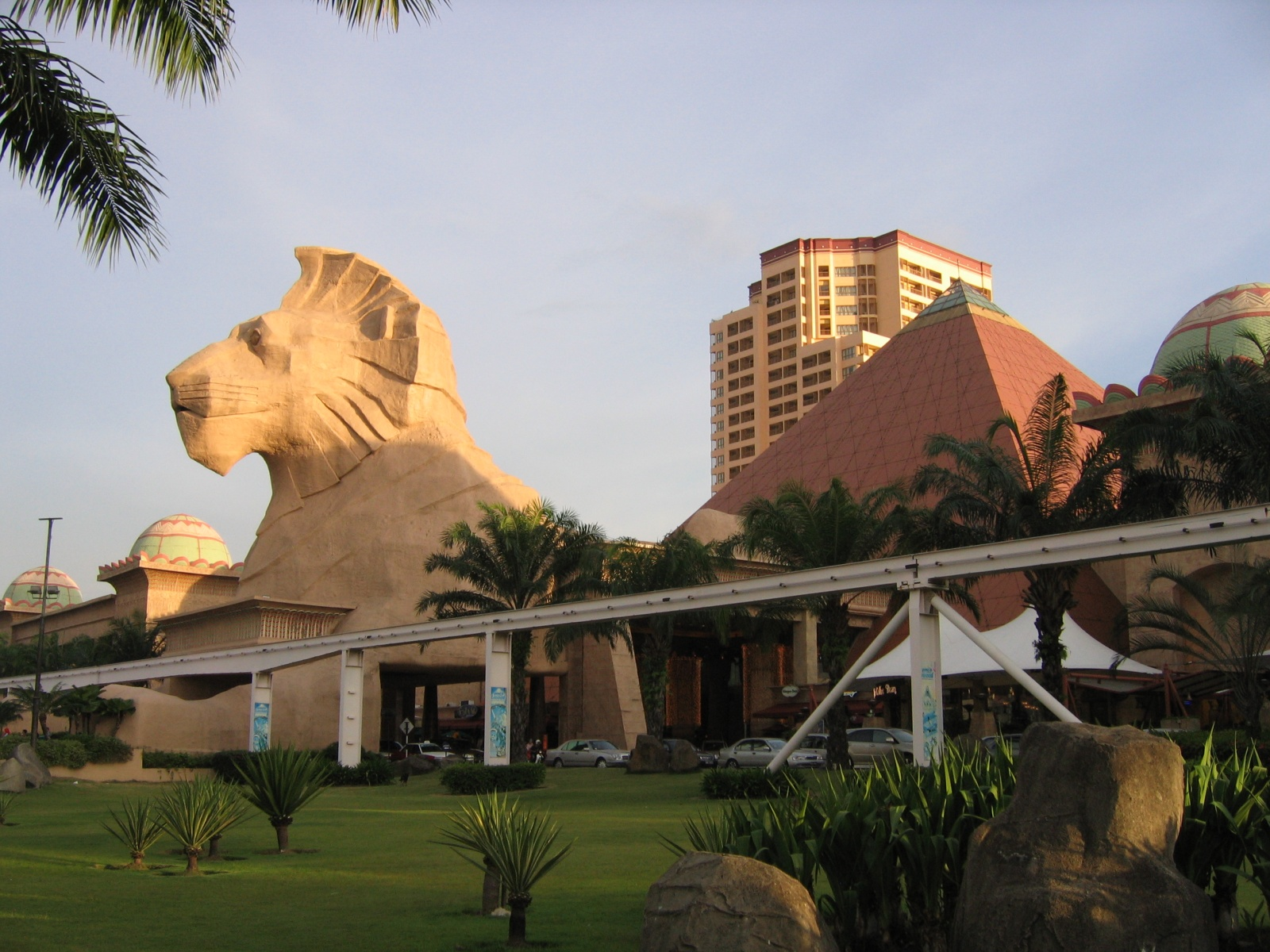
Photo showing the defunct 3 km steel-tracked loop monorail system.

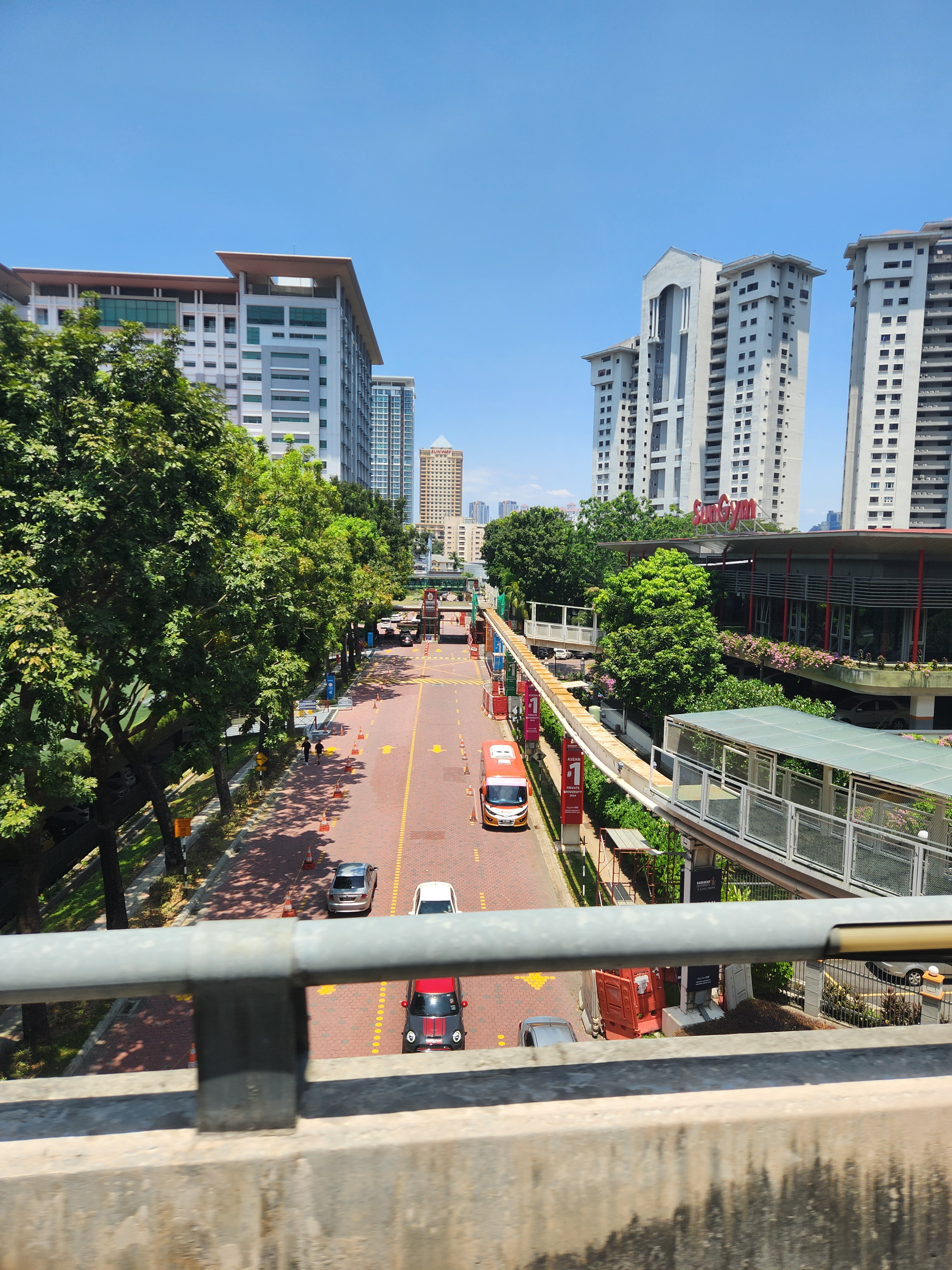
A view of the walkway from the BRT as it is being deconstructed, showing the remains of the Sunway Monorail.

== See also ==
- Monorails in Malaysia
- Severn Lamb
