= MyHSR Corp =

Government-owned Malaysian company

MyHSR Corporation Sdn Bhd
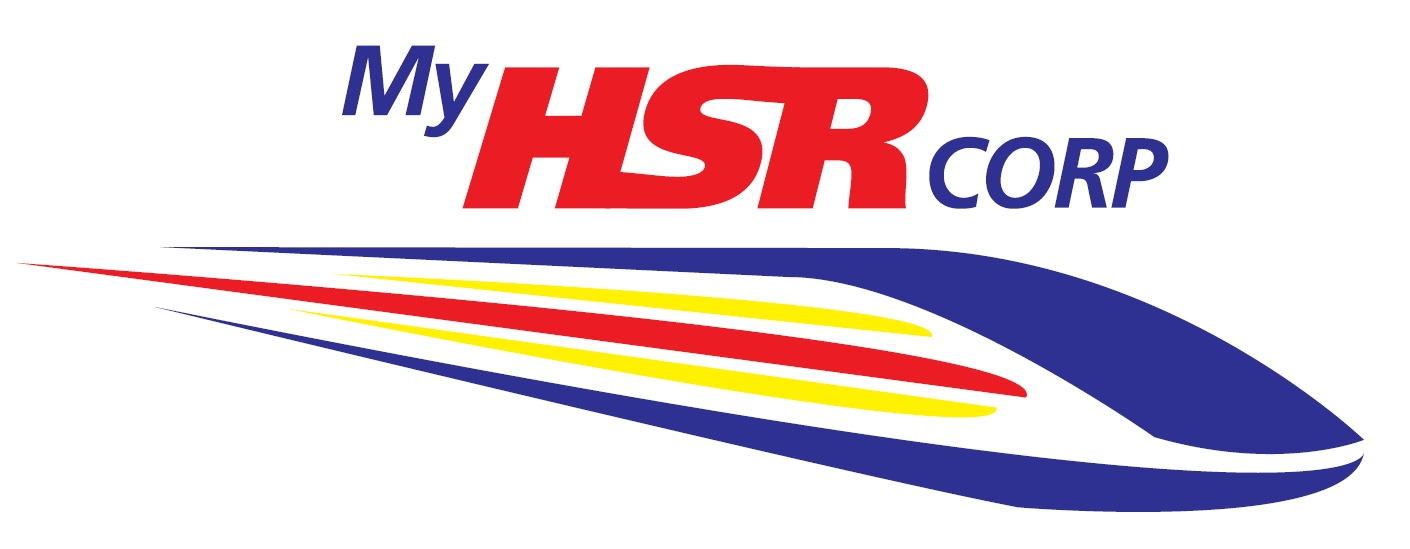
- Company type: State-owned enterprise
- Industry: Developer and asset owner of HSR project
- Key people: Fauzi Abdul Rahman, Chairman; Mohd Nur Ismal Mohamed Kamal, CEO
- Products: Kuala Lumpur–Singapore High Speed Rail Project
- Website: http://www.myhsr.com.my/

MyHSR Corporation Sdn Bhd (MyHSR Corp) is a Malaysian company fully owned by the Ministry of Finance of Malaysia. It was set up to be the developer and asset owner of the terminated Kuala Lumpur–Singapore High Speed Rail project (HSR) at Malaysian side, under the government's move to improve connectivity between the two countries, as currently traffic congestion is acute and far exceeds the capacity of the Causeway at Johor Bahru, with the current infrastructure provisions.

The primary objective for the construction of the HSR is to reduce the travel time between Kuala Lumpur and Singapore to 90 minutes by strengthening the link between two of Southeast Asia's most vibrant and fast-growing economic engines. In addition, the HSR presented an opportunity to open up and rejuvenate smaller cities in Peninsular Malaysia by connecting them to the two major metropolises.

== HSR projects ==
- Kuala Lumpur–Singapore High Speed Rail

== Chronology ==
- 9 April 2015 - MoF seeks RM10m for wholly owned unit MyHSR Corp.
- 13 April 2015 - RM38.4b high-speed rail project approved.
- 18 April 2015 - Cost-sharing likely for HSR.
- 20 April 2015 - MyHSR Corp to oversee high-speed project.
- 24 April 2015 - Malaysia approves US$10.6 billion high-speed rail project and the establishment of MyHSR Corp.

== See also ==
- Planned high-speed rail by country
- Kunming–Singapore Railway
