= Bandar Malaysia =

Proposed transit-oriented development in Kuala Lumpur, Malaysia

Coordinates: 3°07′10.5″N 101°42′14.3″E

Logo of Bandar Malaysia

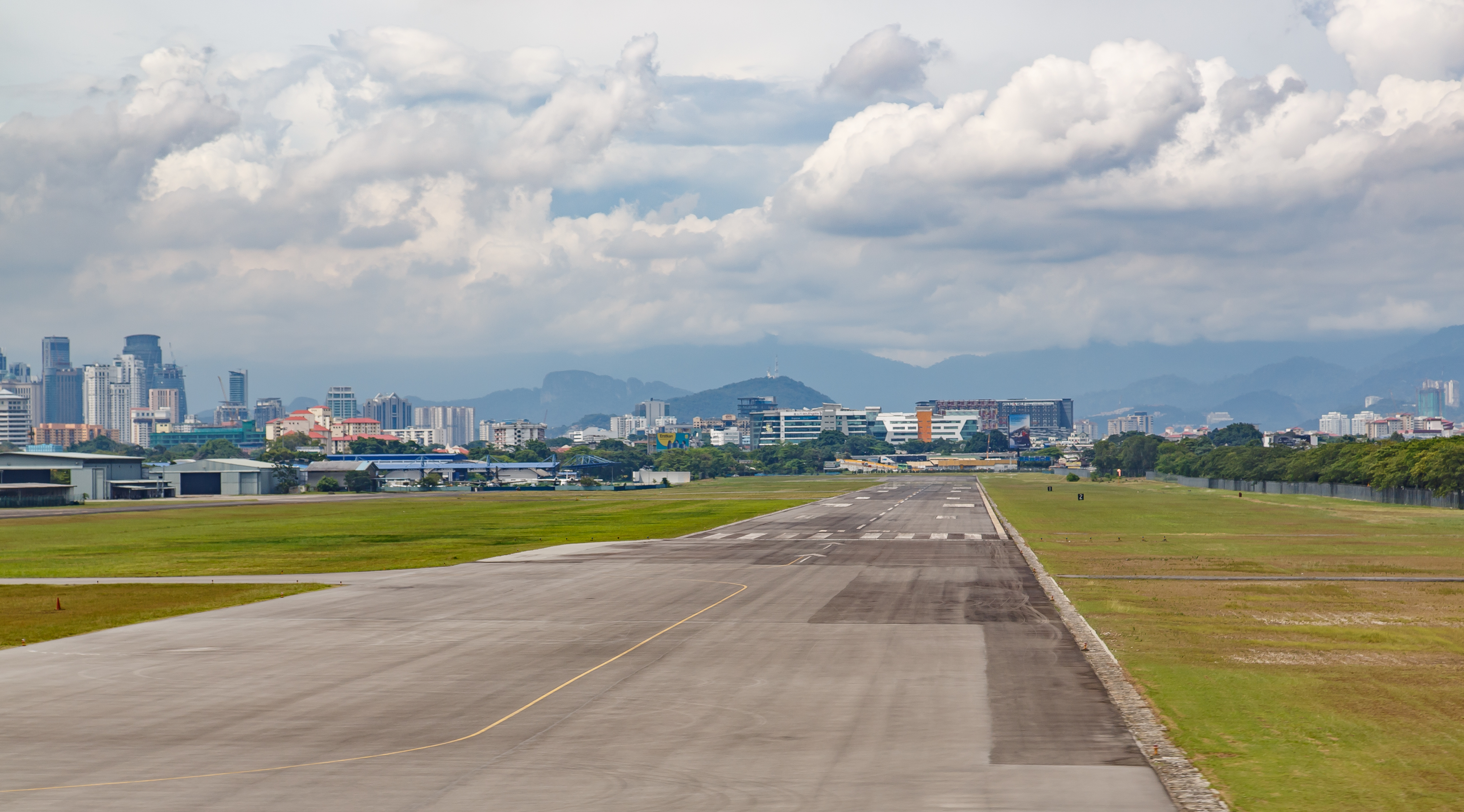
The Sungai Besi Air Base (Sempang Airport)

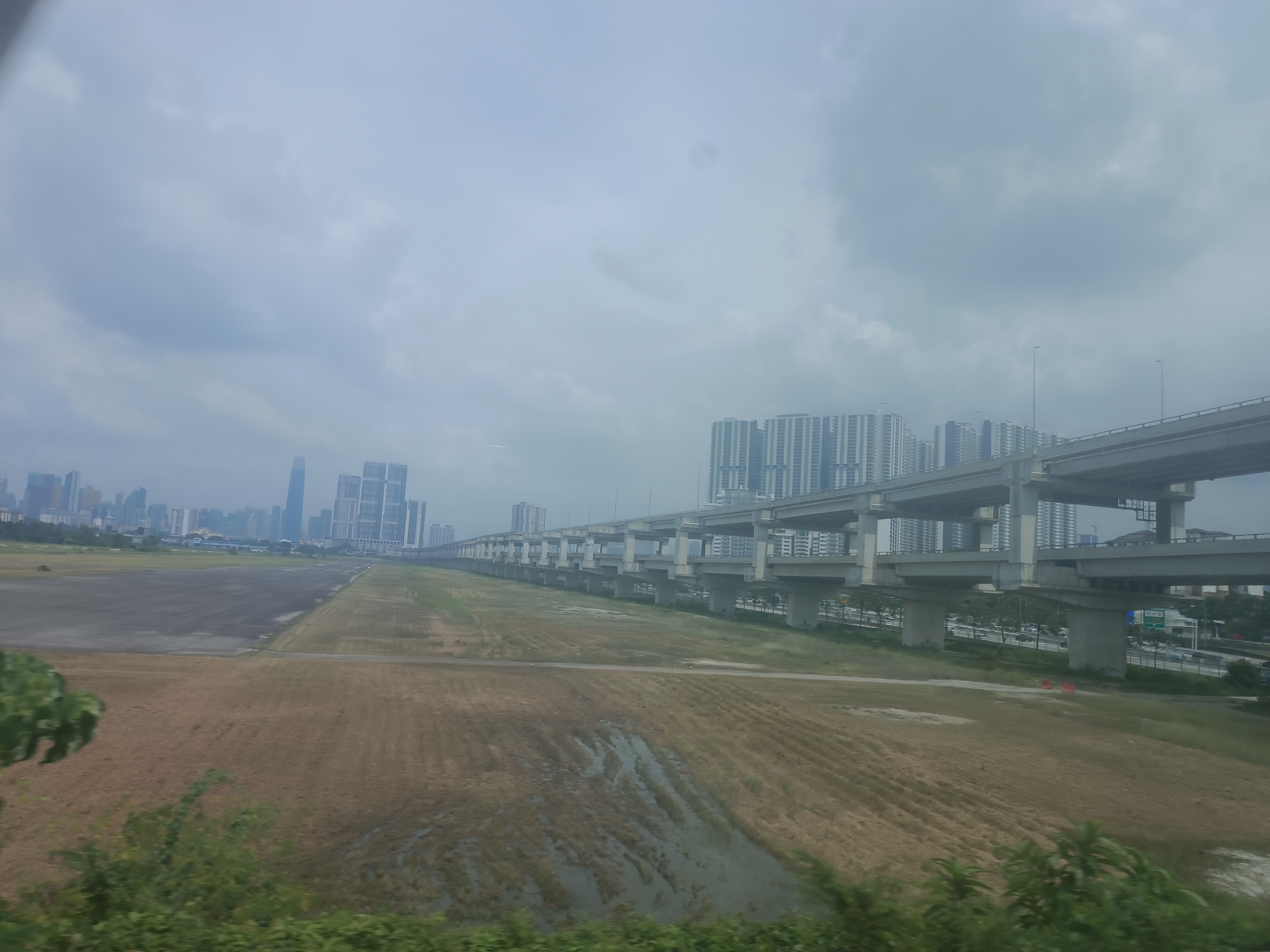
Site of Bandar Malaysia as of 2023

Bandar Malaysia was a proposed mixed-use transit-oriented development located in Kuala Lumpur, Malaysia. This project was to be built at the current Sungai Besi Air Base site over 20 years. It was also planned as a central transport hub connecting high-speed rail to Singapore (namely the Kuala Lumpur–Singapore High Speed Rail), Mass Rapid Transit, KTM Komuter, Express Rail Link, and 12 other highways with an estimated gross development value (GDV) of over RM140 billion.

The development had been initially expected to kick-off in 2020 but was delayed by the COVID-19 pandemic. The project was ready to restart in 2021, after the settlement of a RM1.24bil payment to the Federal Government by IWH-CREC but has since been indefinitely postponed.

== Background ==
On 28 May 2011, Bandar Malaysia project was announced by Malaysia's 6th Prime Minister, Najib Razak with a public-private partnership model. The project has an estimated cumulative gross development value of RM 150 billion. Master planner appointed for architecture drawing was Skidmore, Owings & Merrill. It was supported by 1Malaysia Development Berhad (1MDB) (1MDB).

With this development, the current Royal Malaysian Air Force airbase at Sungai Besi Air Base is to be relocated to Sendayan, Negeri Sembilan for RM 2.7 billion, of which RM1.1 billion is funded by the government and the rest by 1MDB. This relocation project is managed by Perbadanan Perwira Harta Malaysia, a subsidiary of the Armed Forces Fund Board Malaysia known as Lembaga Tabung Angkatan Tentera.

In December 2015, 1MDB sold 60% stake of Bandar Malaysia to the consortium of IWH-CREC Sdn Bhd, which consists of Tan Sri Lim Kang Hoo's Iskandar Waterfront Holdings Bhd and China's China Railway Engineering Sdn Bhd for RM 7.41 billion. However the deal fell apart on 3 May 2016 with the reason of failure to meet payment obligations announced by Ministry of Finance of Malaysia (which owned 1MDB).

In May 2017, Najib Razak visited Beijing, China for One Belt One Road Forum. In a joint conference at Sofitel Beijing Hotel with Wanda Dalian Group, Wanda Dalian Group expressed deep interest to participate in Bandar Malaysia but abandoned its interest months later.

In July 2017, Ministry of Finance launched a request for proposal and up to seven Chinese and two Japanese companies have submitted proposals said to be valued between RM30 billion and RM43 billion for the Bandar Malaysia project but no further elaboration were made by the Ministry of Finance.

On 14 July 2021, it was announced the deal between China Railway Engineering Corp and Iskandar Waterfront Holdings will not proceed given the deal lapsed on 6 May with failure to meet conditions.

== Proposed interchange stations ==
- MRT Putrajaya Line: two stations to be built in the future, PY25 Bandar Malaysia Utara and PY26 Bandar Malaysia Selatan.
- ERL (proposed)
- Kuala Lumpur–Singapore high-speed rail (proposed)
- KTM ETS (proposed)
- KTM Komuter Seremban Line (proposed)
- BRT (shelved)

== See also ==
- 1Malaysia Development Berhad
  - 1Malaysia Development Berhad scandal
- Forest City, Johor
- KL Sentral
- Tun Razak Exchange
- Malaysian National Projects
