= Monorails in Malaysia =

Aspect of transportation

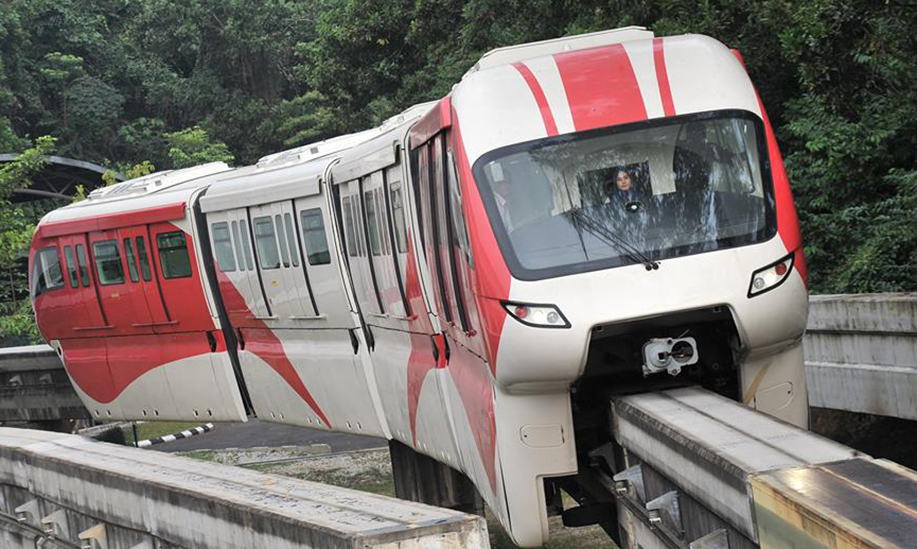
KL Monorail

After the success of the Kuala Lumpur Monorail, there have been numerous proposals laid out in Malaysia to increase users of public transports and to ease the congestion of traffic. Monorails recently became a popular choice of transit system compared to rapid transit systems, citing its quietness, ease of construction, lower cost, and non-obstructiveness.

== Kuala Lumpur ==
The Kuala Lumpur monorail system in Kuala Lumpur, Malaysia opened August 31, 2003, and serves 11 stations running 8.6 km with two parallel elevated tracks. It connects Kuala Lumpur's main station KL Sentral with the "Golden Triangle". Government has announced the upgrading of the depot and additional cars from 2 nos to 4 nos.

== Bandar Sunway, Selangor ==
The Sunway Monorail, a 3-km single track loop, was Malaysia's first monorail when opened in 2000. The line was primarily intended to connect the Sunway Pyramid mall, Sunway Lagoon theme park and surrounding areas to the greater Klang Valley rail system. The line was soon shut down, and a plan proposed in 2007 to revive it and link to the KTM Komuter Setia Jaya station has not been implemented.

The system was later on modified as a walkway connecting various universities around the area, as well as being incorporated into the currently in operation BRT Sunway Line, which connects Port Klang Line's Setia Jaya station to the Kelana Jaya Line's USJ7 station via Bandar Sunway.

== Malacca City, Malacca ==
A 1.6-km monorail in Malacca City, Malacca opened in October 2010, but was shut down due to technical problems in 2013. The Melaka Monorail service began operating again on 4 December 2017, after a 4-year closure.

== Putrajaya ==
Construction of Putrajaya Monorail started in Putrajaya. Linked to the KLIA Transit Putrajaya Sentral, the plan called for 2 lines; one line will be 12 km long with 17 stations and the second will be 6 km long with six stations. Construction was shelved in 2004 due to federal budget constraints. For now, Land Public Transport Commission (SPAD) will be conducting a feasibility study for monorail and tram services for both Putrajaya and Cyberjaya.

== See also ==
- Rail transport in Malaysia
