= Tanjung Berhala =

Coordinates: 4°15′30″N 103°28′5″E

Tanjung Berhala is a small port town in Terengganu, Malaysia, The town is used by Petronas Carigali – one of the subsidiaries of Petronas – and Esso Malaysia as a supply base for the oil and gas production and exploration operations in Terengganu.

Petronas Carigali began operating at Tanjung Berhala in November 1982.
