= Eye Level Learning =

Eye Level
- Type: Subsidiary of Daekyo
- Industry: Education, Tutoring, EdTech
- Founded: 1976
- Headquarters: Seoul, South Korea (Global HQ); Fort Lee, New Jersey, U.S. (Daekyo America, Inc.)
- Key people: Kang Young-joong (Founder); Kang Ho-jun (CEO)
- Products: Eye Level Math, Eye Level English, Summit of Math
- Website: www.myeyelevel.com

Eye Level is an international supplemental education service provider and a flagship brand of Daekyo, a leading education company based in South Korea. Established in 1976, the brand is widely known in its home market as Noonnoppi (Korean: 눈높이), meaning "eye level."

Eye Level operates more than 1,500 learning centers globally, providing personalized, self-paced learning programs for students from preschool to secondary education.

== Global Operations ==
The company manages its international business through a network of direct subsidiaries and franchise partnerships across 19 regions.

- Subsidiaries: Its North American regional headquarters, Daekyo America, Inc. (established in 1991), is located in Fort Lee, New Jersey. Other key subsidiaries are located in Hong Kong, Malaysia, Indonesia, and Singapore.
- Franchise Network: Eye Level's global footprint extends to regions including the United Kingdom, Australia, New Zealand, India, the Philippines, Vietnam, Thailand, Myanmar, Taiwan, UAE, Kuwait, and Uzbekistan.

== Programs and Technology ==
Eye Level’s curriculum is centered on its "Eye Level" philosophy, which emphasizes seeing the world from a child's perspective and allowing students to learn at their own pace.

- Eye Level Math: Covers both arithmetic and critical thinking math, utilizing various physical teaching tools to help students visualize mathematical concepts.
- Eye Level English: An integrated language program covering phonics, reading comprehension, and writing skills.
- Summit of Math: An advanced AI-powered mathematics program that uses patented "Knowledge Unit" analysis to identify specific learning gaps in real-time and provide customized study paths.

== Global Events ==
=== Eye Level Math Olympiad (ELMO) ===
Since 2004, the company has hosted the Eye Level Math Olympiad (ELMO), an annual international competition. It has attracted over 70,000 cumulative participants from 15+ countries. The event provides students with individualized analytical reports to help them understand their strengths in mathematical reasoning and problem-solving.

== Expansion into K-12 Education ==
While sharing the overarching "Eye Level" educational philosophy, Daekyo operates its formal K-12 school division entirely separate from its supplemental tutoring franchises.

=== Eye Level Integrated School (ELIS) ===
Eye Level Integrated School (ELIS) is a premium international kindergarten and K-12 school brand established by Daekyo in Ho Chi Minh City, Vietnam, in 2024. Operating distinctly from the Eye Level learning centers, ELIS provides a formal institutional curriculum aiming for a seamless K-12 educational journey. The inaugural campus is located in the Thao Dien ward of Ho Chi Minh City.

==== Curriculum and Programs ====
The school utilizes a theme-based integrated approach, connecting a single common theme across multiple subjects. The curriculum prioritizes self-directed expression and logical thinking development within an English immersion environment.

Classes are divided into four regular stages according to children's age and developmental characteristics:

- Seed Class (Pre-K, 18–35 months): Play-based learning focusing on basic emotional, cognitive, and physical development.
- Root Class (K1, 36–47 months): Focuses on self-exploration and forming self-efficacy based on physical abilities.
- Leaf Class (K2, 48–59 months): Utilizes fairy tales and storytelling to develop relationship-building and emotional expression skills.
- Flower Class (K3, 60–71 months): Employs project-based learning to develop problem-solving skills.

In addition to the regular curriculum, ELIS offers after-school enrichment programs, including early childhood physical education, art, hands-on mathematics using learning tools, creative science, and musical theater.

==== Parent Communication and Evaluation ====
The institution operates an individualized evaluation system focused on each child's personal growth:

- Digital Communication: The school uses a multimedia smartphone application to share students' daily routines, meals, and educational progress with parents in real time.
- Customized Reports: Detailed reports analyzing the child's understanding and developmental status are provided once a semester.
- Potential Badge: Instead of comparative grading, the school awards individualized badges in the third term that symbolize each child's unique strengths.

== See also ==
- Daekyo
- Supplemental education
