= Genting Monorail =

Defunct monorail system in Genting Highlands, Malaysia

Coordinates: 3°25′26.2″N 101°47′37.4″E

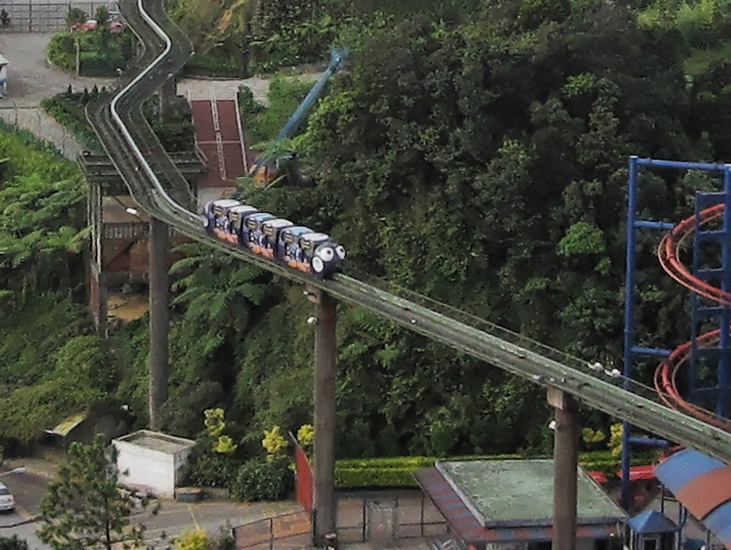

Overview
- Owner: Genting Group
- Locale: Genting Highlands
- Transit type: straddle-beam monorail (Steel-tracked).
- Number of lines: 1
- Number of stations: 2

Operation
- Began operation: 1994
- Ended operation: 1 July 2013
- Operator: Genting Highlands
- Number of vehicles: 5 working gondolas

Technical
- System length: 1 km
- Average speed: 1 m/s (3.6 km/h)

Genting Monorail was a monorail servicing the Genting Highlands theme park in Malaysia. The first monorail in the country, the caterpillar themed trains were first used at the Dutch Floriade in 1992, before they were sold to the Malaysian theme park and operated from 1994 until 1 July 2013. It was a steel-tracked or straddle-beam monorail service with a 1-km long track, 5 working gondolas with an average speed of 3.6 km/h and 2 stations.
