= Salak Selatan LRT station =

Malaysian low-rise rapid transit station

SP13 CC26 Salak Selatan

General information
- Other names: Malay: سالق سلاتن (Jawi); Chinese: 沙叻秀; Tamil: சாலாக் செலாத்தான்
- Location: Jalan Sungai Besi, Salak South; 57100 Kuala Lumpur; Malaysia
- Coordinates: 3°6′7″N 101°42′22″E
- System: Rapid KL
- Owner: Prasarana Malaysia (LRT); MRT Corp (MRT)
- Operator: Rapid Rail
- Lines: 4 Sri Petaling Line; 13 Circle Line (future)
- Platforms: 2 side platforms
- Tracks: 2

Construction
- Structure type: Low-rise
- Parking: Available

Other information
- Station code: SP13 CC26

History
- Opened: 11 July 1998; 28 years ago (LRT)
- Opening: 2032; 6 years' time (MRT)

Services
Preceding station		Following station
Cheras towards Sentul Timur	Sri Petaling Line	Bandar Tun Razak towards Putra Heights
Salak Jaya Clockwise / outer	Circle Line Future service	Sri Permaisuri Anticlockwise / inner
Location

Salak Selatan LRT station is a Malaysian low-rise light rapid transit (LRT) station situated near and named after the Kuala Lumpur township of Salak South. The station is part of the LRT Sri Petaling Line (formerly known as STAR LRT Line).

The station was opened on 11 July 1998, as part of the second phase of the STAR LRT system's opening, including 7 new stations along the Chan Sow Lin-Sri Petaling route.

The station is planned as a future interchange with the upcoming MRT Circle Line of the KVMRT project.

== Location ==
The Salak Selatan station is intended to serve the incorporated town of Salak South directly to the east; the station itself is located behind a row of shophouses along Salak South's main carriageway, Jalan Sungai Besi, towards the east. There are 2 exits for the station; the west side exits to Salak South, Pekan Salak Selatan, Desa Petaling and Rapid KL bus stops, while the east exit is for the passenger pick up / drop off zone and Bandar Sri Permaisuri.

The Salak Selatan station was constructed along two levelled tracks, reusing the now defunct Federated Malay States Railway (FMSR) and Keretapi Tanah Melayu (KTM) route between Kuala Lumpur, Ampang and Salak South.

The station is currently one of two railway stations serving the Salak South locality, the other being a KTM Komuter station bearing the same name. While the LRT station is considerably closer to Salak South, the Komuter station is located some 400 metres south of the town. Unlike other examples in Kuala Lumpur, the two stations are not designated as interchange stations on official transit maps. The same can be seen with the Sentul LRT station and Sentul Komuter station in Sentul, which serve the same area but are two separate stations far apart from one another.

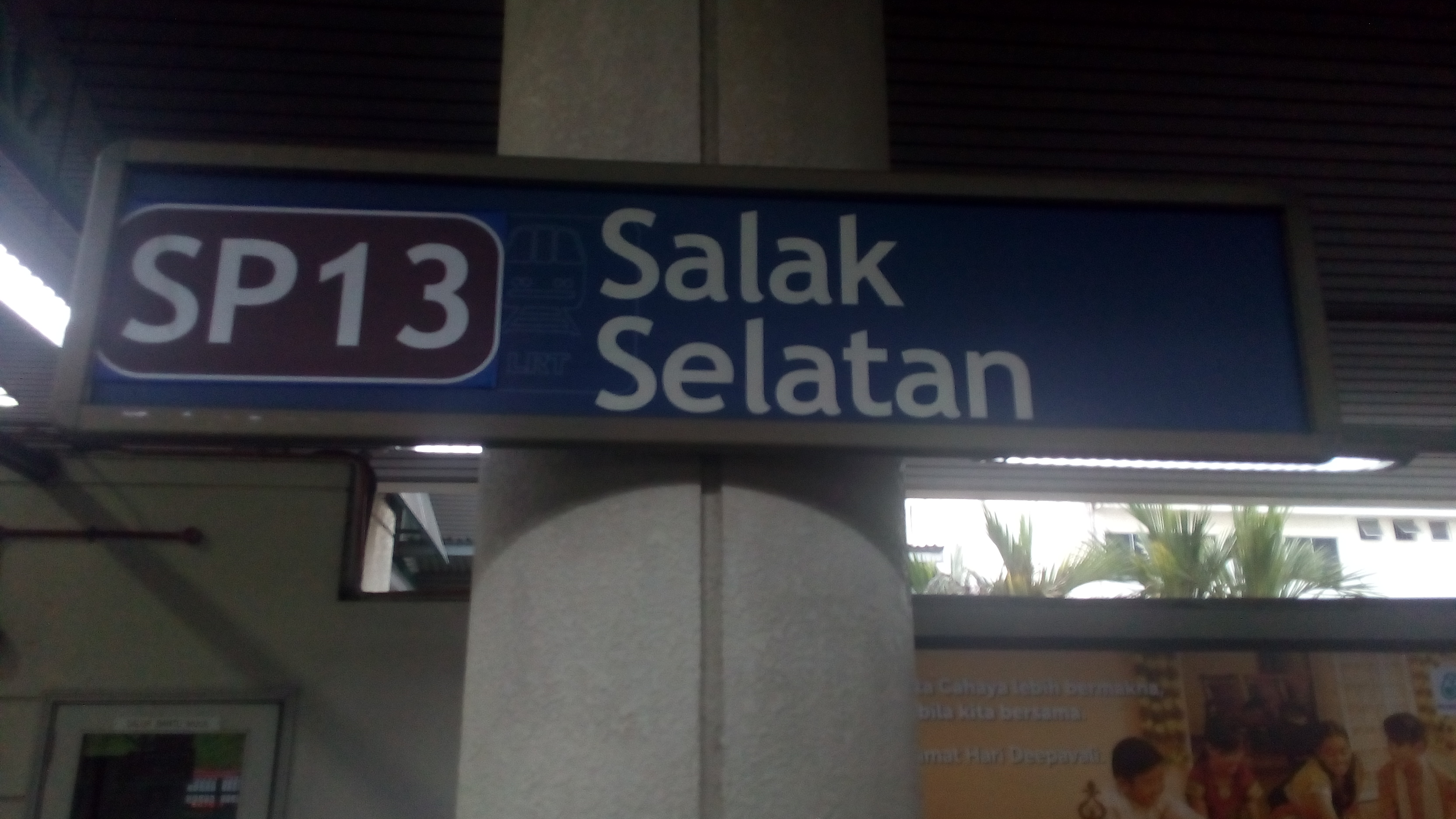
Station platformboard

Station faregates

== Design ==
Overall, the Salak Selatan LRT station was built as a low-rise station along two tracks for trains travelling in opposite directions. The ticketing area and faregates are located at the northbound platform (Platform 1). Because the station is nearly subsurface and features two side platforms, a tunnel was built underneath the railway tracks, connecting the two platforms. The station also serves as a public crossing across the railway tracks between Salak South and Bandar Sri Permaisuri via an underground walkway running underneath the railway tracks and platforms and parallel to the tunnel connecting the platforms.

The principal styling of the station is similar to most other stations in the line, featuring multi-tiered roofs supported by latticed frames, and white plastered walls and pillars. Because stairways are only used to link street level with the station's ticket areas and platforms, the station is not accessible to disabled users.

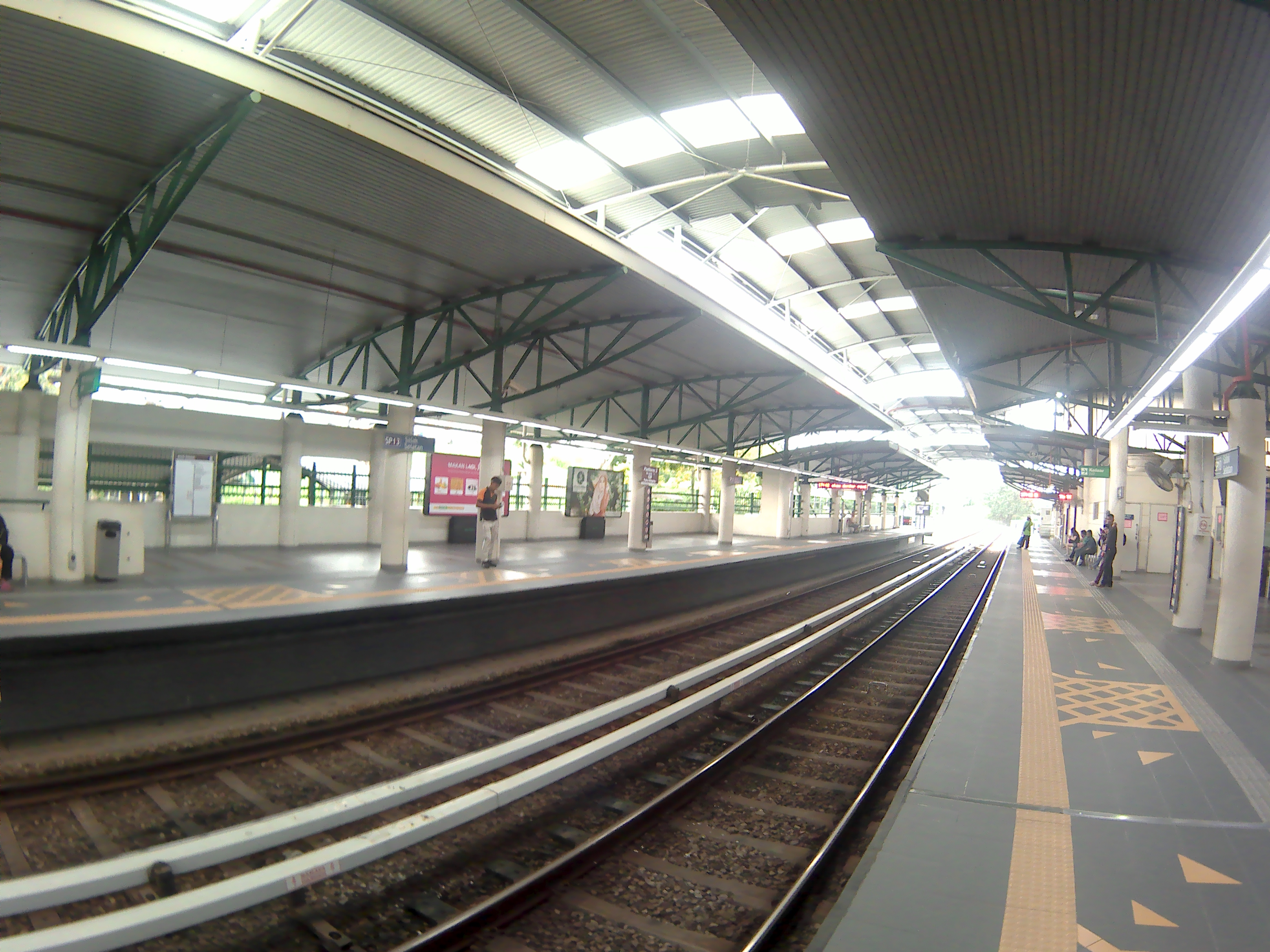
Salak Selatan station's platforms as of 2017

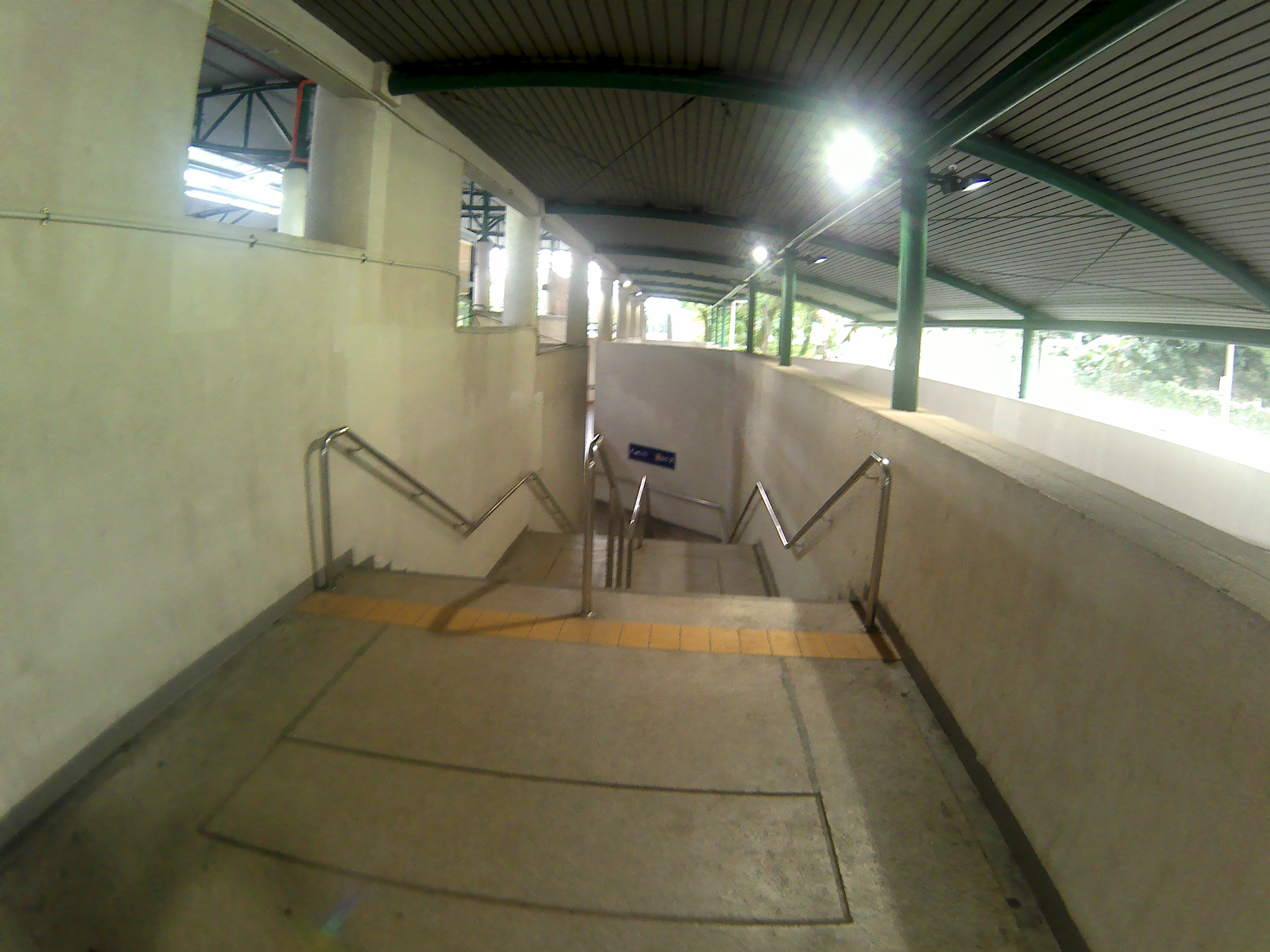
Underground linkway of the station

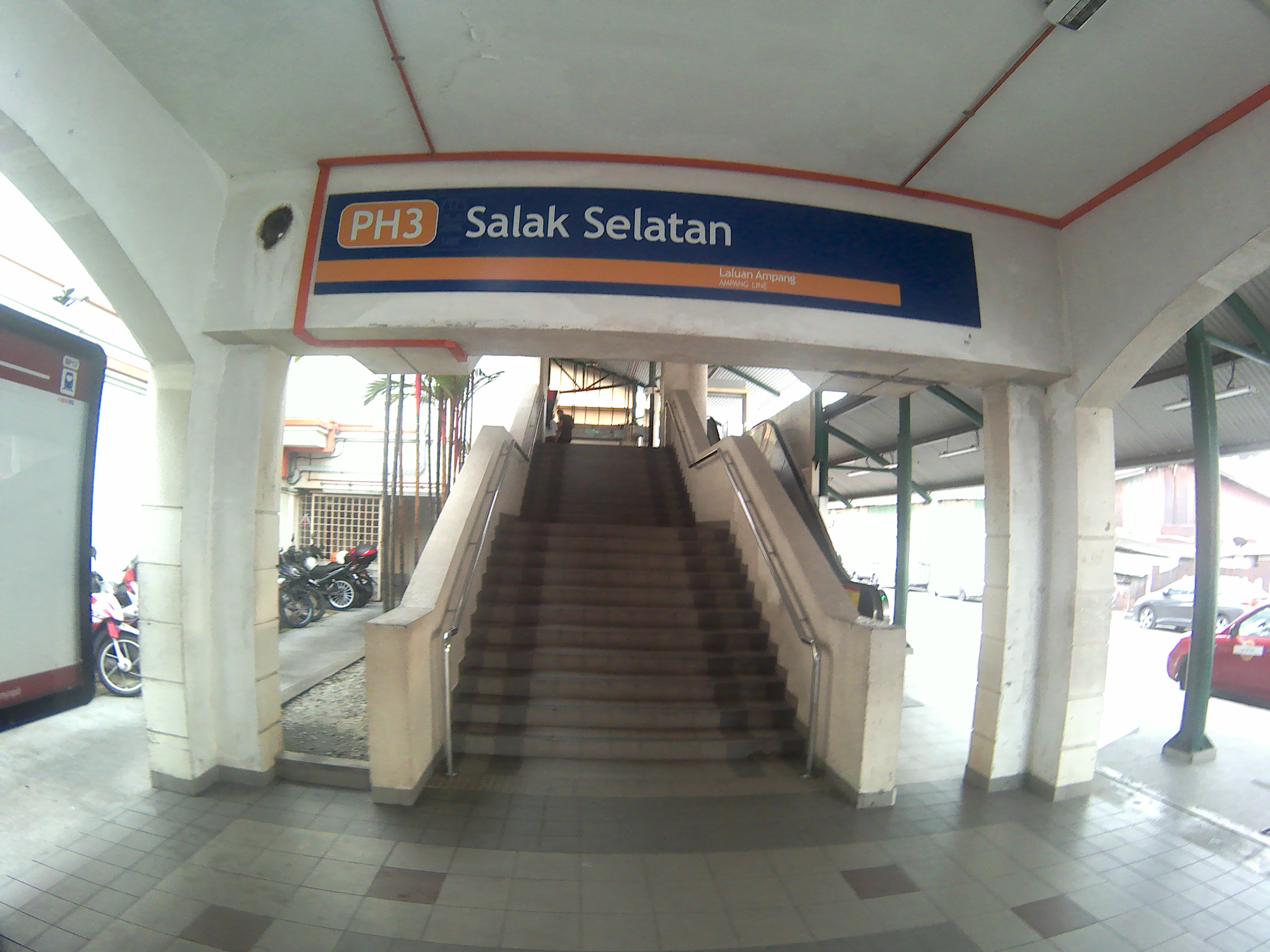
The station's main entrance, as of December 2017 used the older code “PH3” (Now SP13).

== See also ==
- List of rail transit stations in Klang Valley
