= Kuala Lumpur–Singapore high-speed rail =

Proposed high-speed rail project

- HSR
- Map of the proposed KL–SG HSR

Overview
- Native name: Kereta Api Berkelajuan Tinggi Kuala Lumpur–Singapura (Malay) 吉隆坡—新加坡高速铁路 (Chinese) கோலாலம்பூர்–சிங்கப்பூர் அதிவேக தொடருந்து (Tamil)
- Status: Suspended (2021); Revived (2023); RFI and RFP (2025); Commissioning (TBA)
- Owner: (Malaysia) MyHSR Corp (Singapore) SG HSR
- Locale: Malaysia; Singapore
- Termini: • Bandar Malaysia, Kuala Lumpur • Putrajaya • Seremban, Negeri Sembilan • Ayer Keroh, Melaka • Muar, Johor • Batu Pahat, Johor • Iskandar Puteri, Johor; • Jurong East, Singapore
- Stations: 8

Service
- Type: High-speed rail
- System: Kuala Lumpur–Singapore high-speed rail
- Services: 3 (express, shuttle and domestic)
- Operator(s): OpCos • OpCo International (Express & Shuttle service) • OpCo Domestic (Domestic service)
- Rolling stock: 10-car trainsets capacity for up to 100 passengers per car

Technical
- Line length: 350 km (220 mi) (Malaysia) 335 km (208 mi) (Singapore) 15 km (9.3 mi)
- Track gauge: 1,435 mm (4 ft 8 1/2 in) standard gauge
- Electrification: Overhead line
- Operating speed: 320 km/h (200 mph)
- Signalling: ETCS

The Kuala Lumpur–Singapore high speed rail (HSR) is a proposed high-speed rail line linking Kuala Lumpur, Malaysia with Jurong East, Singapore. It was first announced by Malaysian Prime Minister Najib Razak in September 2010, with Singaporean Prime Minister Lee Hsien Loong formally agreeing to the joint project in February 2013. The line was initially scheduled for completion in 2026.

However, the project faced political hurdles in Malaysia. Following the 2018 Malaysian general election, Najib was defeated and his successor Mahathir Mohamad initially announced the project would be scrapped. During a visit to Japan on 12 June 2018, he clarified that it would only be postponed due to high costs. On 5 September 2018, both governments announced operations would begin in January 2031. The 2020 Malaysian political crisis then brought the Perikatan Nasional (PN) government to power under Muhyiddin Yassin. A further extension was granted until the end of 2020 to review the project, but no agreement was reached and it was terminated on 1 January 2021 in a joint statement. Consequently, Malaysia paid Singapore S$102 million in compensation. After two years of uncertainty, the project was revived in July 2023 with the Malaysian government under Anwar Ibrahim calling for new proposals.

The proposed HSR line would span 350 km (217 mi), cutting travel time between Kuala Lumpur and Singapore to about 90 minutes with trains running at speeds of up to 320 km/h (200 mph). The line was planned to begin at Bandar Malaysia in Kuala Lumpur and pass through towns and cities including Seremban, Malacca, Muar and Batu Pahat before terminating at Jurong East in Singapore's West Region.

== History ==
=== Background ===
A high-speed rail link between Kuala Lumpur and Singapore was proposed in the late 1990s but due to high costs, the proposal was shelved. In 2006, YTL Corporation, operator of the Express Rail Link in Kuala Lumpur, revived the proposal, with a projected speed of 250 km/h (155 mph). This was expected to trim travel time between the two cities to 99 minutes, compared to 4–5 hours by road or 7 hours by conventional rail services, or 3 hours by air (including travel to and from the airports, check-in, boarding and other airport procedures). In 2008, the Malaysian government halted the project citing high-costs of over RM8 billion.

The proposal was highlighted in 2010 as a high-impact project, out of the 131 entry-point projects, in the Malaysian government's Economic Transformation Programme Roadmap in a bid to increase economic activities concurrently with greater economic synergy between two important regional financial hubs. Studies into the feasibility and conceptual details of the proposal were carried out in December 2010 and January 2011.

=== Announcements and plans ===
The Prime Ministers of Malaysia and Singapore agreed to proceed with the HSR project after a meeting on 19 February 2013. A committee was tasked with looking into 'the details and modalities' of the project. At the meeting, Singapore and Malaysia have announced that the high-speed rail proposal would be finalised by end of 2014 with a targeted completion date of 2020.

The proposal for Singapore's link was considered by the Land Transport Authority (LTA) in Budget 2014. According to the Leaders' Retreat which was held on 7 April 2014, the possible locations for the high-speed rail terminus was narrowed down to Tuas West, Jurong East or the Downtown Core. On 6 February 2015, the Malaysia-Singapore Joint Ministerial Committee for Iskandar Malaysia (JMCIM) released a press statement stating that Singapore had announced Jurong East as the final location for the high-speed rail terminus. However, the terminus would not be connected to the Jurong East MRT station.

Various parties have taken an interest in the project, such as Japan and South Korea. Similarly, during a state visit by the Prime Minister of Singapore to France, Singapore's Transport Minister Lui Tuck Yew told the press that French firms are keen to participate in the project. On 7 October 2015, the LTA and SPAD jointly announced the launch of a "market sensing exercise" on the Kuala Lumpur–Singapore high-speed rail project.

Singapore and Malaysia signed a Memorandum of Understanding on 19 July 2016 at a signing ceremony held at the then Malaysian Prime Minister Najib Razak's official residence in Putrajaya, witnessed by both Lee Hsien Loong and Najib Razak. It was signed by Singapore Transport Minister and Coordinating Minister for Infrastructure Khaw Boon Wan along with Malaysian Minister in the Prime Minister's Department Abdul Rahman Dahlan. There were also details including a 25-metre-high bridge link near the Malaysia–Singapore Second Link and three services to be operated by two operators. At the same meeting, the leaders agreed on technical details for the Johor Bahru–Singapore Rapid Transit System (RTS) link, which will connect the Thomson–East Coast MRT line (TEL) to Johor Baru via another high bridge near the Johor–Singapore Causeway.

In 2015, the Malaysian government established MyHSR Corp to facilitate developing and implementing high-speed rail projects. The company was under the control of the Ministry of Finance and the supervision of the Malaysian Ministry of Transport.

=== Developments ===
The Government of Singapore has made the second large acquisition of land for the project by requiring Raffles Country Club to vacate its plot as the site offers the "most suitable location" to run the HSR tracks after the bridge crossing and to place the tunnel portal leading to the tunnels that would take the HSR to the Jurong East terminus. The site is expected to be vacated by 31 July 2018, to be used for HSR crossover tracks and a siding facility to temporarily house a train near the border for safety or operational reasons. The site is now occupied by the Singapore Rail Test Centre. On 8 February 2017, LTA appointed engineering design firm AECOM Singapore to conduct an advanced engineering study for Singapore's stretch of the Singapore–Kuala Lumpur high-speed rail (HSR) infrastructure.

On 16 February 2017, LTA and MyHSR awarded the HSR joint development partner (JDP) contract to a consortium comprising WSP Engineering Malaysia, Mott MacDonald Malaysia and Ernst & Young Advisory Services. They would provide management support, technical advice on systems and operations, develop safety standards and help prepare tender documents for the joint project team of LTA and MyHSR. In the same month, it announced that the Singapore terminus would be designed by British architecture firm Farrells. On 17 October 2017, the Prime Minister of Malaysia Najib Razak announced that the land acquisition process has begun in Malaysia for the project and also the station designs.

On 5 April 2018, MyHSR Corp announced the results of the selection process for the design and construction for the Malaysian portion of the project: A consortium of Malaysian Resources and Gamuda would build the northern part, and a consortium of Syarikat Pembenaan Yeoh Tiong Lay and TH Properties the southern part. The tender process for the Singapore tunnel sections was started in April 2018 with the start of construction expected in 2019.

The former Prime Minister and Opposition leader, Dr Mahathir Mohamad threatened to cancel or at least delay the project if he won the 14th Malaysian general election, which prompted the CEO of MyHSR Corp to urge all parties to refrain from politicising the project. By late May 2018, Mahathir confirmed that Malaysia would scrap the project, citing its high construction costs and downplaying its benefits. However, he appeared to backtrack on earlier statements during an official visit to Japan, commenting that the project was merely postponed until Malaysia was in better financial conditions, further reaffirming the peninsula's need for High-Speed Rail in the future. Among revisions being explored to reduce costs, was to align the route to the existing meter gauge Keretapi Tanah Melayu (KTM) line to allow trains to run at 200 km/h with some upgrades in order to trim travel time to 2 hours and 10 minutes and lay a standard gauge track in parallel, with a fork running to Jurong East so that bilateral agreement is not violated.

On 5 September 2018, after meetings, Singapore and Malaysia have formally agreed to postpone the construction of the KL-Singapore High-Speed Rail until end-May 2020, with Malaysia having to pay Singapore S$15 million for costs incurred in suspending the project before the end of January 2019. In a joint statement, both nations also announced the HSR express service would be delayed until January 2031 instead of the original December 2026. A new agreement was signed by Malaysia's Economic Affairs Minister Azmin Ali and Singapore's Transport Minister Khaw Boon Wan at the Prime Minister's Office in Putrajaya on Wednesday afternoon. Malaysia has since informed Singapore on 31 January 2019 that it has remitted S$15 million in abortive costs. In December 2019, the Malaysian Prime Minister Mahathir Mohamad said that Malaysia would be ok with the high speed rail project, but with trains running at a reduced speed to help reduce costs.

In April 2020, UBS argued that the coronavirus could make people switch from air travel to high speed rail, thus solidifying the case for the HSR.

On 29 May 2020, it was announced that Singapore was considering a request by the Malaysian government to extend the suspension of the HSR project. On 31 May, Singapore Transport Minister Khaw Boon Wan said that Singapore had agreed to the suspension until 31 December 2020.

In late December 2020, reports surfaced that Malaysia had decided to proceed with the HSR project alone, with the project stopping at Johor Bahru and not ending in Jurong, as originally planned. In response, a Singapore Ministry of Transport spokesman said both sides were still in discussion. The decision to end the line in Johor Bahru has been criticised by Johor PKR deputy chief Jimmy Puah Wee Tse, who questioned the economic viability of the new alignment.

=== Termination ===
On 1 January 2021, the prime ministers of Malaysia and Singapore announced the termination of the HSR project. While both governments had held several discussions on Malaysia's proposed changes, they were unable to reach an agreement. However, some members of the public in Malaysia felt that the project would have spurred on local economies and rebound faster from the economic impact. Some Malaysian states, Malacca and Negeri Sembilan, which would have the line going through them had expressed that the cancellation would impact on their local economies and development plans. The Johor state government has expressed hope to continue the project without Singapore. In Singapore, however, it is believed by economics experts that the cancellation would have little impact on the Jurong Lake District development plans, since the HSR project was only included two years after the area's development plans were finalised. The land initially set aside for the HSR can be made used for other purposes.

Singapore Transport Minister Ong Ye Kung subsequently revealed in a parliamentary session that the "main concern" leading to the termination of the project was Malaysia's suggestion to remove the assets company AssetsCo, which would have been a "best-in-class industry player" appointed through an open tender, to provide the means to run and operate the network. Singapore saw the removal of the assets company as a "significant departure" from the original agreement as both countries are inexperienced with running a HSR, and the assets company would have helped to ensure that both countries' interests are protected. This and other changes, such as bringing forward the construction timeline, to the partnership would have allowed Malaysia additional flexibility in its financing options, including deferring payments and accessing financing at more favourable rates, while boosting the construction sector in Malaysia.

Announcing that they will continue on with "the necessary actions" resulting from the termination, both sides remained committed to preserve good relations and continue working on improving the connectivity between the two nations. Malaysia, which has allowed the termination, will have to compensate Singapore for the costs incurred as according to the agreement. At the point of termination, Singapore had incurred a cost of at least S$270 million. On 29 March 2021, Malaysia compensated Singapore S$102.8 million (US$75.36 million), with the settlement representing the complete termination of the project and bilateral agreement.

=== Plan revival ===
On 29 November 2021, at the launch of the Malaysia–Singapore land Vaccinated Travel Lane (VTL) scheme, Malaysian prime minister Ismail Sabri Yaakob suggested reviving discussions of the terminated HSR project. While Singapore prime minister Lee stated that the project has already been terminated with compensation paid, he added that the Singapore government is open to "fresh proposals" for the government to look through and resume talks on a "clean slate". Malaysia Minister in the Prime Minister's Department (Economy) Mustapa Mohamed added, however, that the discussions were still in its early stages, with the issue of reducing costs yet to be discussed. At the same time, feasibility studies on a possible domestic HSR have concluded and will be presented to the Malaysian cabinet. The domestic HSR was claimed to be essential for enhancing the connection between Kuala Lumpur and Johor Bahru, despite being criticized as less feasible and viable by the opposition.

On 2 March 2022, Tan Sri Muhyiddin Yassin, chairman of the ruling Perikatan Nasional (PN), expressed support for the revival of the project. Talks on reviving the project began in the second quarter of 2022. At the same time, the Malaysian government is looking into the possibility of extending the project to neighboring Thailand, which was first proposed in September 2016. On 22 August, Malaysian prime minister Ismail said Malaysia hopes to revive the project "at the earliest possible date", with the project's term and conditions changed. He also hoped the rail line would be part of a greater HSR network connecting to China.

Following Pakatan Harapan chairman Anwar Ibrahim's appointment as prime minister of Malaysia after the 2022 general elections, Singaporeans have again reportedly called for the Anwar administration to revive the project.

On 11 July 2023, MyHSR Corp called for proposals from the private sector and firms to be submitted for the development of the HSR project. This signifies the revival of the project after 2 years of cancellation. The project was expected to cost 100 billion ringgit ($21 billion), several groups composed of Chinese, Japanese, and European firms submitted their concept proposal. On 11 January 2024, the group consisting of East Japan Railway and Sumitomo reportedly dropped out of their bid, leaving local firms seeking cooperation with Chinese and European companies.

On 15 January 2024, MyHSR Corp received seven proposals from private bidding groups. Bid selection and further negotiations with the Singapore government were expected to be undertaken in the second half of 2024. On 17 July 2024, Transport Minister Anthony Loke announced the decision will be determined in the fourth quarter of 2024, and three companies were shortlisted. According to local media, the three preferred candidates are consortiums led by YTL Corporation, Berjaya Land Bhd and China Railway Construction Corporation. The government's policy suggested that the final bid needs to be 51% owned by Malaysian firms and the $21.4 billion budget requires private capital so that the government's liability does not increase.

As of October 2025, no decision has been made on the project's revival.

== Plan details ==
The line was to be about 350 kilometres (220 miles) and the travel time would have been 90 minutes. The construction costs was initially estimated at MYR 72 billion (US$17.4 billion) by the Barisan Nasional government, but the subsequent administration led by Mahathir estimated it to be at MYR 110 billion (US$26.6 billion) in 2018 due to hidden costs. However, experts and earlier news reports had estimated the costs to be at around MYR 40 billion (US$9.7 billion). The project would require the construction of a brand-new line with dedicated tracks, which would allow trains to travel at least 270 km/h (170 mph). MYHSR Corp was to co-ordinate the project for the essential construction within the Malaysia corridor, whereas LTA was to be in charge for Singapore corridor.

=== Original project timeline ===
The planned timeline, prior to its cancellation by the Malaysian Government in 2021, is as follows.

- 19 July 2016: Signing of MOU for KL–Singapore HSR project
- August 2016: Singapore to call tender for advance engineering studies. Singapore–Malaysia joint tender for Joint Development Partner
- 13 December 2016: Bilateral agreement signed
- Late 2017: Civil works and tender for private entity overseeing train and rail assets
- 2018–2025: Construction
- Late 2023: International and domestic operators tender
- 2024–2026: Testing and commissioning

== Train and operation ==
MyHSR Corp stated that Kuala Lumpur-Singapore non-stop high-speed rail express service would run every 30 minutes from Bandar Malaysia, at the outskirts of downtown Kuala Lumpur, to Jurong East in Singapore. The non-stop express service would reach Singapore in 90 minutes and passengers boarding at Bandar Malaysia station would be able to clear Singapore Immigration before boarding.

The HSR would also offer a Malaysian domestic service that would see the train stop at all in-between intermediaries stop at seven stations in Malaysia. This service which also runs every half-hour, would take 120 minutes. Those taking the domestic service from stations such as Seremban or Ayer Keroh near Malacca City who want to enter Singapore would have to clear Singapore Immigration at Iskandar Puteri station and then use a shuttle train service from Iskandar Puteri, which would take another 15 minutes to Jurong East station, the HSR stop in Singapore.

== Stations ==
=== Design ===
Malaysia's Land Public Transport Commission chairman, Syed Hamid Albar, announced the stops in Malaysia on 22 October 2014. On 5 May 2015, the Singapore government has chosen Jurong East to be the terminal for this line in Singapore. Jurong Country Club, completed the handover of the land parcel in November 2016. Another acquisition of a golf club, the Raffles Country Club was announced on 4 January 2017, with the operation completed by end-June 2018.

On 17 October 2017, the Prime Minister of Malaysia revealed the concept designs for all stations in Malaysia. According to him, the design of each station is conceptualised to reflect the nation's culture, heritage, and identity on each of the station's corridor while remaining modern and futuristic, and also to demonstrate the growth vision that the HSR would bring. HSR would also have three depots in Serdang, Muar and Pontian.

The concepts of the stations are:

- Bandar Malaysia: a re-interpretation of the confluence of Klang and Gombak rivers, which symbolises wisdom and unity of the people.
- Bangi-Putrajaya: inspired by the Islamic architecture, especially of mosques, and envisions Malaysia's aspirations as a progressive nation, articulated by the pointed arches standing united.
- Seremban: a modern interpretation of the local Minangkabau architecture of Negeri Sembilan.
- Ayer Keroh: designed from the image of a merchant ship which symbolises the entrepreneurship spirit of local communities, also symbolising Malacca's history as a strategic trading port in its heyday.
- Muar: inspired by the "rehal" which is traditionally used to place the Quran as students learn to recite it, thus symbolising the importance of learning.
- Batu Pahat: inspired by the "kuda kepang", a horse-like item used in a traditional dance amongst Javanese descendants of Johor, which aims to strike a balance between heritage and modernisation.
- Iskandar Puteri: a stylised representation of a handshake, signifying Iskandar Puteri's role as a regional city for commerce and international encounters.

=== Services ===
Station code	Station name	Station location	Platform Type	Express stops	Shuttle stops	Domestic stops	Notes
KL	Kuala Lumpur	Bandar Malaysia	Island and Side	●		●	The co-located Customs, Immigration and Quarantine (CIQ) facilities would be located here. International-bound passengers would need to undergo CIQ clearance by both countries' authorities only at the point of departure. This station also would be a connecting station to the Putrajaya Line & the proposed stations for Batu Caves–Pulau Sebang Line, KLIA Ekspres and KLIA Transit.
PU	Sepang-Putrajaya	Kampung Abu Bakar Baginda	Side	|		●	Connection to proposed Putrajaya Monorail.
SE	Seremban	Labu	Island	|		●	Connecting station Integrated transport hub for KTM line Labu to Port Dickson and ERL line to KLIA.
AK	Ayer Keroh	Ayer Keroh, Melaka	Side	|		●	
MU	Muar	Bandar Universiti Pagoh	Side	|		●	
BP	Batu Pahat	Pura Kencana, Sri Gading	Side	|		●	
IP	Iskandar Puteri	Gerbang Nusajaya	Island and Side	|	●	●	The co-located Customs, Immigration and Quarantine (CIQ) facilities would be located there. International-bound passengers would need to undergo CIQ clearance by both countries' authorities only at the point of departure.
SG	Singapore	Jurong East		●	●		The co-located Customs, Immigration and Quarantine (CIQ) facilities would be located there. International-bound passengers would need to undergo CIQ clearance by both countries' authorities only at the point of departure. This station would also be a connecting station to the future Jurong Region and Cross Island MRT line.

== See also ==
- Singapore-Malaysia international rails
  - Johor Bahru–Singapore Rapid Transit System
  - Kunming–Singapore Railway
- Johor Bahru
  - Transport in Malaysia
  - Iskandar Malaysia BRT
  - List of bus routes in Johor Bahru
- Singapore
  - Transport in Singapore
  - Mass Rapid Transit (Singapore)
  - Thomson–East Coast MRT line
- Others
  - Planned high-speed rail by country
