= Salak Selatan Komuter station =

Train station in Salak South, Kuala Lumpur, Malaysia

Salak Selatan

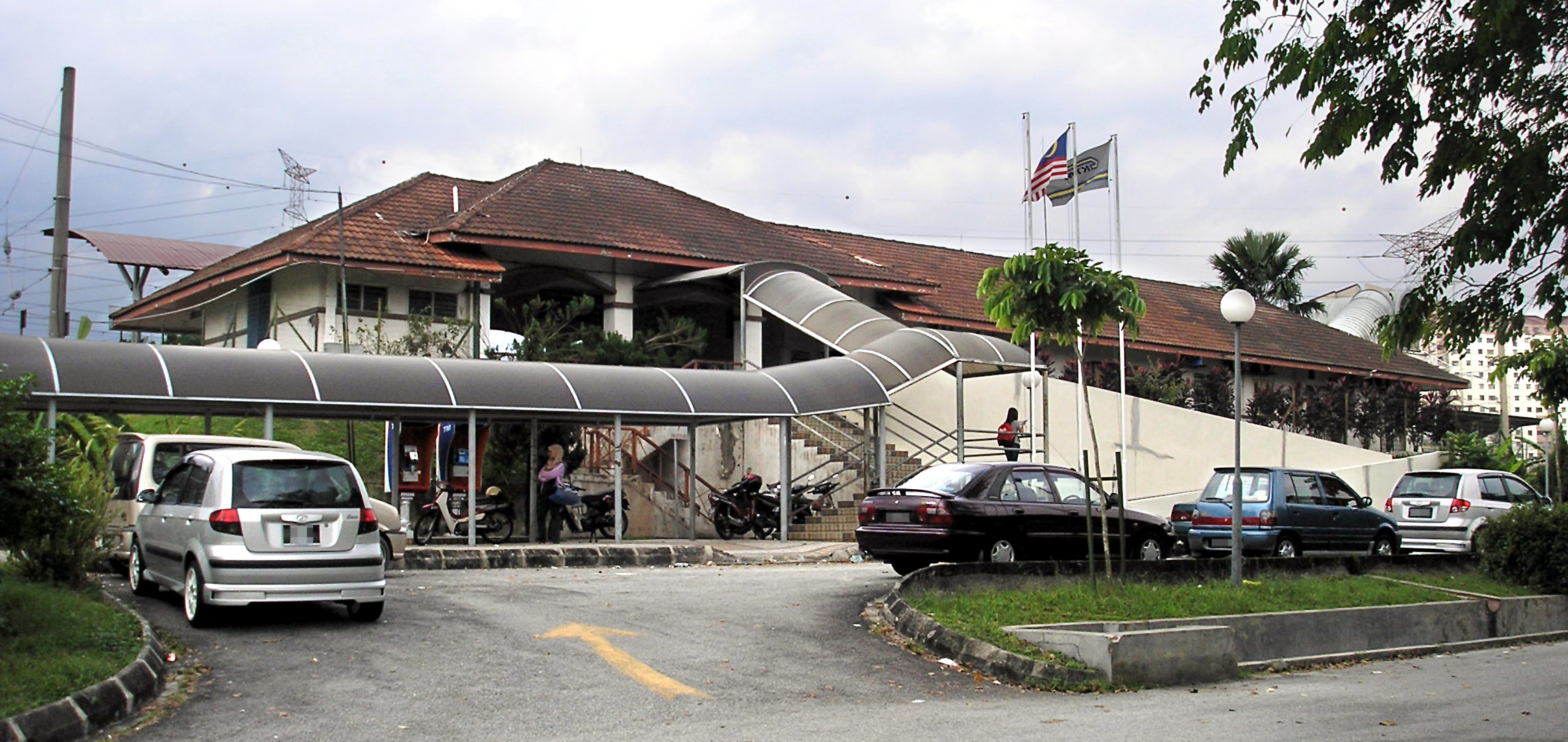

General information
- Other names: Malay: سالق سلاتن (Jawi); Chinese: 沙叻秀; Tamil: சாலாக் செலாத்தான்
- Location: Salak South, Kuala Lumpur; Malaysia
- Coordinates: 3°5′54″N 101°42′18″E
- System: KB03 | Commuter rail station
- Owner: Railway Assets Corporation
- Operator: Keretapi Tanah Melayu
- Line: West Coast Line
- Platforms: 2 side platforms
- Tracks: 4

Construction
- Structure type: At-grade
- Parking: Available
- Cycle facilities: Not available
- Accessible: No

Other information
- Station code: KB03

History
- Opened: 1995
- Rebuilt: 1995
- Electrified: 1995

Services
Preceding station	Keretapi Tanah Melayu (Komuter)	Following station
Seputeh towards Batu Caves	Batu Caves–Pulau Sebang Line	Bandar Tasik Selatan towards Pulau Sebang/Tampin
Location

The Salak Selatan Komuter station is a KTM Komuter at-grade train station located near the township of Salak South, Kuala Lumpur, Malaysia. Facing the Salak Expressway off Exit 3704 of the highway, the station is situated about 400 metres south of the old town of Salak South.

The station is primarily served by the Batu Caves–Pulau Sebang Line (formerly known as the Seremban Line). The station was built along four rail tracks. The station, like many stations along the KTM Komuter lines, has only two platforms for northbound or southbound passengers. The platforms are served by the two outermost tracks, while the middle inner tracks are used as bypass tracks for trains that do not stop at the station. The station in charge of managing railway switches and supports a small railway staff team. The station is also linked to storage facilities and machinery for track maintenance.

The Salak Selatan LRT station, located next to the old portion of Salak South, is also situated 400 metres away from the Komuter station, requiring passengers to leave any of the two stations to walk along a stretch of road to reach the other station. Due to the distance between both stations and despite sharing the same name, they are not effectively integrated or regarded as connecting stations.

The Komuter station is located in Kampung Baru Salak Selatan, a newer portion of Salak South development. On official railway maps, the location of the station is added to the Komuter station to differentiate it with the LRT station.
