= Salak South =

Town of Kuala Lumpur, Malaysia

Coordinates: 3.090028°N 101.7055912°E

Salak South (Malay: Salak Selatan) is a town of Kuala Lumpur, Malaysia at the southern tip of the city.
