= Taman Pertama MRT station =

MRT station in Kuala Lumpur, Malaysia

KG23 Taman Pertama
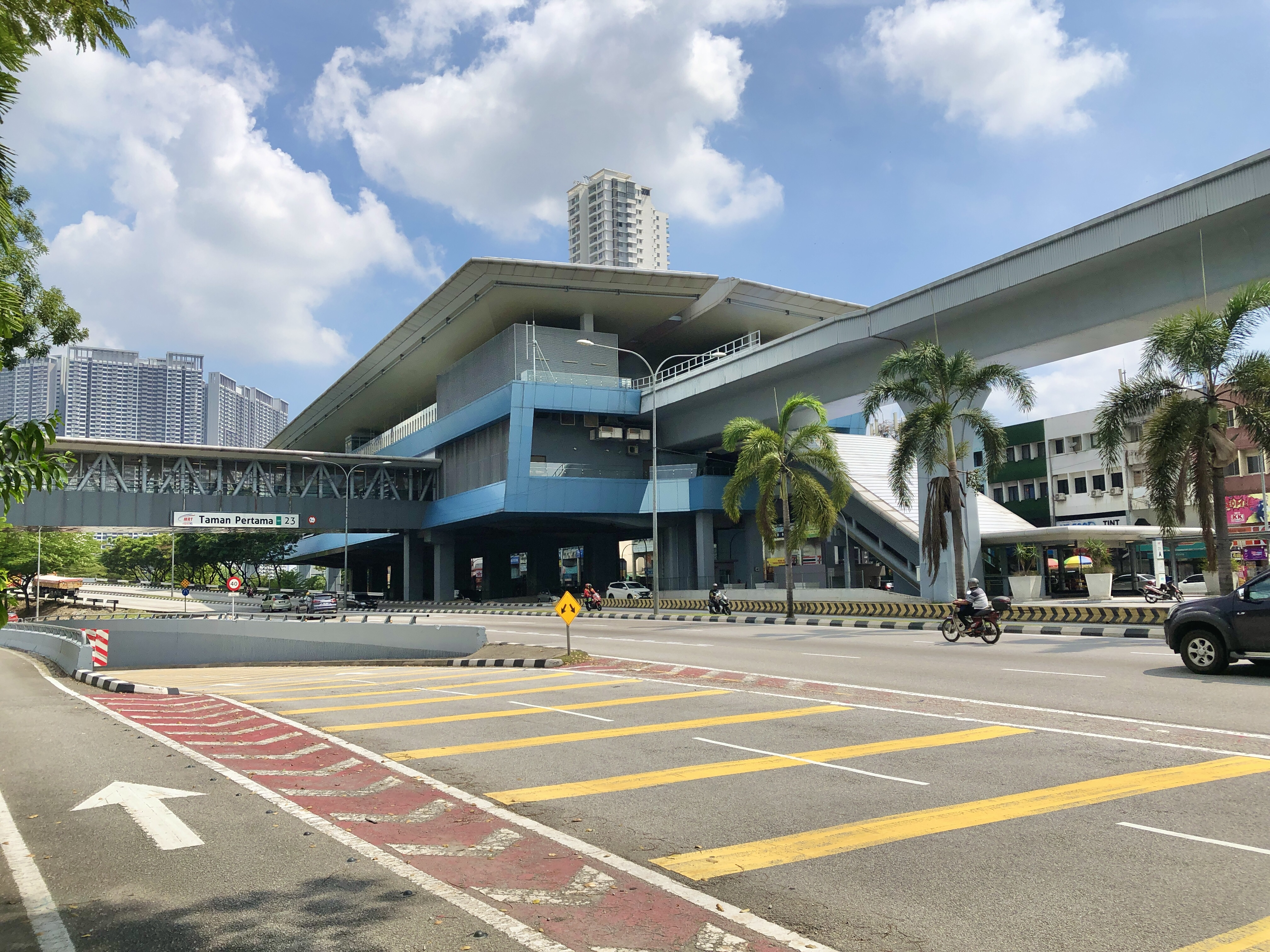
- The MRT station as seen from Jalan Cheras

General information
- Other names: Malay: تامن ڤرتام (Jawi); Chinese: 第一花园; Tamil: தாமான் பெர்த்தாமா
- Location: Cheras Highway (Jalan Cheras), Taman Pertama, Cheras; 55300 Kuala Lumpur; Malaysia
- Coordinates: 3°06′45.86″N 101°43′45.44″E
- System: Rapid KL
- Owner: MRT Corp
- Operator: Rapid Rail
- Line: 9 Kajang Line
- Platforms: 2 side platforms
- Tracks: 2

Construction
- Structure type: Elevated
- Parking: Not available
- Cycle facilities: Not available
- Accessible: Yes

Other information
- Status: Operational
- Station code: KG23

History
- Opened: 17 July 2017; 9 years ago
- Former names: Taman Bukit Ria

Services
Preceding station		Following station
Maluri towards Kwasa Damansara	Kajang Line	Taman Midah towards Kajang
Location

The Taman Pertama MRT station is a mass rapid transit (MRT) elevated station on the MRT Kajang Line in Cheras, Kuala Lumpur, Malaysia. It is located along the Cheras Highway (part of the Malaysia Federal Route 1 which is also known as Jalan Cheras, right next to where the road branches to Jalan Loke Yew, Jalan Yaacob Latif and Jalan Cheras proper. The station was opened on 17 July 2017, along with 18 adjoining stations as part of Phase Two of the MRT Kajang Line.

The station was provisionally known as Taman Bukit Ria during construction. This is the first elevated station (towards Kajang) after exiting the underground section at Maluri.

The station serves the nearby suburbs of Taman Pertama, Taman Bukit Ria, several DBKL public housing complexes and parts of Bandar Tun Razak. The station is also near the former site of the now-defunct Cheras Velodrome.

== Station Background ==
=== Station Layout ===
The station has a layout and design similar to that of most other elevated stations on the line (except the terminus and underground stations), with the platform level on the topmost floor, consisting of two sheltered side platforms along a double-tracked line and a single concourse housing ticketing facilities between the ground level and the platform level. All levels are linked by lifts, stairways and escalators.

L2	Platform Level	Side platform
L2	Platform Level	Platform 1: 9 Kajang Line towards KG35 Kajang (→)
L2	Platform Level	Platform 2: 9 Kajang Line towards KG04 Kwasa Damansara (←)
L2	Platform Level	Side platform
L1	Concourse	Faregates, Ticketing Machines, Customer Service Office, Station Control, Shops, Overhead Bridge to Entrance B
G	Ground Level	Entrances A and B, Taxi and E-hailing lay-by, Jalan 2/90, Taman Pertama, Jalan Cheras, Velodrom Kuala Lumpur

=== Exits and entrances ===
The station has two entrances. Entrance A leads to Taman Pertama, and Entrance B leads to the former site of the Cheras Velodrome. An overhead pedestrian bridge connects the station with Entrance B across the Cheras Highway (Jalan Cheras).

Kajang Line station
Entrance	Location	Destination	Picture
A	Jalan 2/90	Taxi and E-hailing lay-by, Taman Pertama	
B	West side of Cheras Highway (Jalan Cheras)	Cheras Velodrome, Jalan Yaacob Latif, Taman Tenaga via overhead bridge	

== Bus Services ==
The station is currently not directly served by any bus services. It does not have feeder buses, unlike other MRT stations, due to there not being a feeder bus hub at the station. However, the station is indirectly served by buses from the Velodrom Kuala Lumpur bus stop, which is a 200-metre walk from the station's Entrance B, or the BHP Cheras bus stop, which is a 300-metre walk from Entrance A.

=== MRT Feeder Bus Services ===
Route No.	Origin	Destination	Via	Notes
T305 (As a pass-by)	KG24 Taman Midah (Entrance B)	Hub Sri Nilam Bandar Baru Ampang	Jalan Kuari; Taman Sri Bahtera; Kampung Cheras Baru; Taman Muda; Taman Seraya; Taman Melur; Pandan Mewah; Paragon Point; Hospital Ampang; Ampang Avenue; FT 1 Cheras Highway (Jalan Cheras); KG24 Taman Midah (Entrance A); Velodrom Business Park	For KG24 MRT Taman Midah (Entrance B) bound only.

=== Other Bus Services ===
Route No.	Operator	Origin	Destination	Via	Notes
450	Rapid KL	Hentian Kajang	Hub Lebuh Pudu	Reko Sentral; Bandar Kajang; KG34 Stadium Kajang; KG33 Sungai Jernih; Sungai Sekamat; Simpang Balak; KG31 Bukit Dukung; Cheras–Kajang Expressway; Jalan Hulu Langat; Batu 9 Cheras / Taman Suntex; Cheras Sentral / KG26 Taman Connaught; FT 1 Cheras Highway (Jalan Cheras); KG24 Taman Midah; Velodrom Business Park; AG13 KG22 Maluri; Jalan Pasar; Jalan Pudu	For KL-bound, the bus will stop at the Velodrom Business Park bus stop. It is around 200 meters from Entrance B. For Kajang-bound, the bus will stop at the KL1704 BHP Cheras bus stop. It is around 300 meters from Entrance A.
400	Rapid KL	Damai Perdana	Hub Lebuh Pudu	Taman Desa Baiduri; Alam Damai; FT 1 Cheras Highway (Jalan Cheras); KG24 Taman Midah; Velodrom Business Park; AG13 KG22 Maluri; Jalan Pudu; Berjaya Times Square / MR5 Imbi; KG18A Bukit Bintang; MR6 Bukit Bintang; Jalan Raja Chulan; Jalan Tun H.S. Lee	For KL-bound, the bus will stop at the Velodrom Business Park bus stop. It is around 200 meters from Entrance B. For Kajang-bound, the bus will stop at the KL1704 BHP Cheras bus stop. It is around 300 meters from Entrance A.
