= Cheras Highway =

Road in Malaysia

Federal Route 1
- Cheras Highway (Cheras Road) (Loke Yew Road)

Route information
- Existed: 1988–present
- History: Completed in 1991

Major junctions
- North end: Edinburgh Circus, Kuala Lumpur
- Kuala Lumpur Middle Ring Road 1 Sungai Besi Expressway; FT 28 Kuala Lumpur Middle Ring Road 2 East–West Link Expressway; Cheras–Kajang Expressway
- South end: Plaza Phoenix, Cheras

Location
- Country: Malaysia
- Primary destinations: Pudu; Sungai Besi; Bandar Tun Razak; Cheras; Kajang; Seremban

Highway system
- Highways in Malaysia; Expressways; Federal; State

Cheras Highway, Federal Route 1 also known as Cheras Road and Loke Yew Road is a major highway in Kuala Lumpur, Malaysia.

== History ==
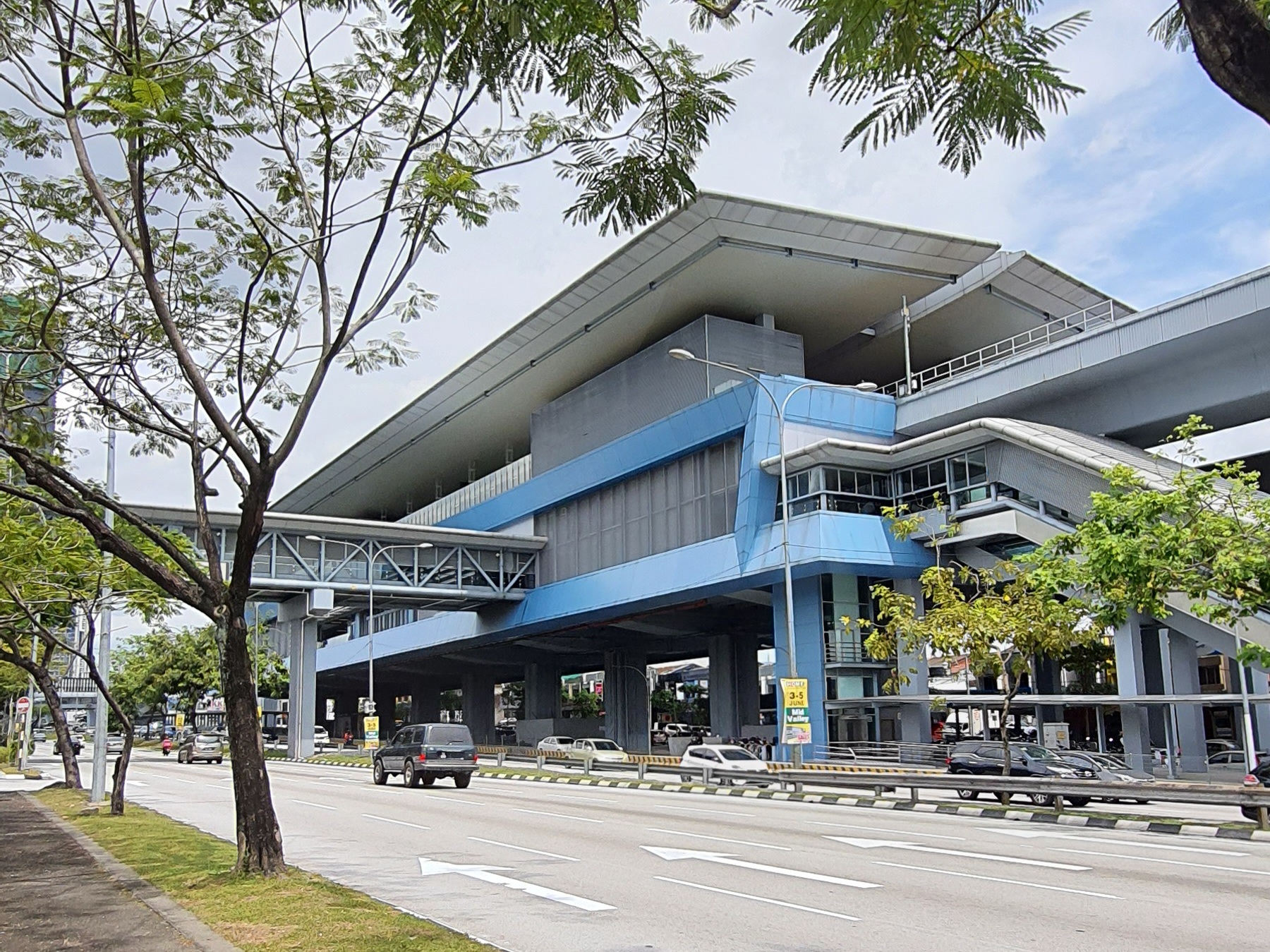
Taman Midah MRT station now stands at the opposite side of the former location of Kajang-bound Jalan Cheras toll plaza, photo taken in May 2022.

This highway was upgraded in 1988 by Metramac Corporation Sdn.Bhd. The Cheras Road toll plaza began operations from 1 September 1990. After being suspended a year later before reopening on 15 September 1991, toll charges reduced by 50 percent from the usual RM1. After many complaints and traffic jams, the toll plaza was abolished on 14 September 2003 and replaced by Taman Midah MRT station on 17 July 2017. Today, the highway is maintained by Kuala Lumpur City Hall (DBKL).

Due to the congestion on the Cheras Highway, two projects were led by the DBKL. These included an underpass from the Cheras–Kajang Expressway to Taman Connaught and flyovers to Taman Len Seng and Alam Damai. It was opened on 14 April 2008. Other projects are Bulatan Cheras–Bandar Tun Razak roundabout underpass from Cheras Highway to Cheras Road and Jalan Tenteram was opened on 2010. The Sungai Buloh–Kajang MRT line runs along much of the highway, starting from Taman Pertama MRT station, past the Taman Connaught interchange and along the Cheras-Kajang Expressway to Kajang.

=== Cheras Highway floods 2014 ===
A flash floods in Cheras Highway near Cheras Leisure Mall in Cheras occurred on 23 August 2014 caused a massive traffic congestion in many parts of the city centre.

== Features ==
At most sections, the Kuala Lumpur–Rawang Highway was built under the JKR R5 road standard, allowing maximum speed limit of up to 90 km/h.

- Several MRT stations along Cheras Highway

== Interchange lists ==
The entire route is located in Federal Territory of Kuala Lumpur.

Legend:

- I/C - Interchange, I/S - Intersection, RSA - Rest and service area, OBR - Overhead bridge restaurant, R/R - Restaurant and rest plaza, L/B - Layby, V/P - Vista point, TN - tunnel, T/P - Toll plaza, BR - Bridge

Km		Exit	Flyover	Name	Destinations	Notes
E7	FT1	Exit	Flyover	Name	Destinations	Notes
Through to FT 1 Kuala Lumpur Inner Ring Road
—N/a		I/C	Ground	Edinburgh Circus I/C	Old Airport Road (Jalan Dewan Bahasa) – Dewan Bahasa dan Pustaka, Bangsar, Petaling Jaya, Shah Alam, Klang; Kuala Lumpur Inner Ring Road (Jalan Hang Tuah) – Merdeka Stadium, National Stadium, Jalan Pudu, Jalan Bukit Bintang, Jalan Imbi	Diamond interchange
—N/a		I/C	Loke Yew Flyover	Loke Yew I/C	Jalan Sungai Besi – Pudu, Pudu Road; Kuala Lumpur Middle Ring Road 1 (Jalan Tun Razak) – Kuala Lumpur City Centre (KLCC); Sungai Besi Expressway – Salak South, Kuchai Lama, Sungai Besi, Mines Resort City; Kuala Lumpur–Seremban Expressway – KL Sports City, Seremban, Malacca, Johor Bahru, Petaling Jaya, Shah Alam, Klang	Multi-level stacked roundabout interchange
—N/a			Loke Yew Flyover	Jalan Chan Sow Lin Exit	Jalan Chan Sow Lin – Sungai Besi Industrial Area, 3 4 12 Chan Sow Lin station	From Cheras only
—N/a		BR	Loke Yew Flyover	Railway crossing bridge		
—N/a			Ground	Miharja Exit	Miharja – P&R 3 Miharja LRT station	KL bound
—N/a			Ground	Jalan Lombong Exit	Jalan Lombong – Maluri, Plaza Uncang Emas	Kajang bound
—N/a		I/C	Kerayong River bridge	SBE I/C	Sungai Besi Expressway – Shamelin, Maluri, Pandan Indah, Ampang, Ulu Klang, Kuantan	
—N/a		BR	Kerayong River bridge	Railway crossing bridge		
—N/a		BR	Kerayong River bridge	Kerayong River bridge		
—N/a		I/C	Ground	Cheras Roundabout-Bandar Tun Razak I/C	Jalan Cheras Lama – Maluri, Shamelin; Jalan Yaacob Latif (Jalan Tenteram) – Bandar Tun Razak; Hospital Universiti Kebangsaan Malaysia (HUKM)	Roundabout interchange with two directional underpass from Loke Yew Road to Bandar Tun Razak and from Cheras Road south to Jalan Cheras Lama north
—N/a			Ground	Taman Pertama MRT station	9 Taman Pertama MRT station	
—N/a			Ground	Jalan Yaacob Latif Exit	Jalan Yaacob Latif (Jalan Tenteram) – Bandar Tun Razak, Hospital Canselor Tuanku Muhriz UKM (HUKM), Cheras Velodrome	KL bound
—N/a			Ground	Taman Midah MRT station	P&R 9 Taman Midah MRT station	
—N/a			Ground	Former Jalan Cheras southbound toll plaza location		
—N/a			Ground	Jalan Kuari Exit	Jalan Kuari – Cheras Christian Cemetery	Kajang bound
—N/a			Ground	Taman Midah Exit	Taman Midah – Bandar Tun Razak	KL bound
—N/a		I/C	Ground	Cheras; Cheras Roundabout I/C	FT 28 Kuala Lumpur Middle Ring Road 2 – Ampang, Kuantan, Batu Caves, Ipoh, Kepong, Bandar Tun Razak, Bandar Tasik Selatan; Sungai Besi Expressway – Sungai Besi; North–South Expressway Southern Route / AH2 – Kuala Lumpur International Airport (KLIA), Seremban, Malacca, Johor Bahru; Shah Alam Expressway – National Sports Complex, Shah Alam, Klang, Pulau Indah	Multi-level stacked roundabout interchange (Former MRR2 toll plaza location)
—N/a			Ground	Taman Mutiara MRT Station	9 Taman Mutiara MRT station	
—N/a		I/C	Ground	Taman Taynton I/C	Jalan Dato Haji Harun – Taman Taynton， Taman Mutiara Barat， Taman Billion; Jalan Manis – Taman Segar， Taman Mutiara Timur， Taman Desa Aman， Taman Supreme， Cheras Leisure Mall	Double U-turn interchange
—N/a		I/C	Ground	Plaza Phoenix I/C	East–West Link Expressway – Bandar Tun Razak, Bangsar, Petaling Jaya, Shah Alam, Klang; Plaza Phoenix Flyover – Taman Connaught, Taman Len Seng, Alam Damai, Plaza Phoenix	Trumpet interchange with dedicated flyover to major townships in Cheras (Taman Connaught, Taman Len Seng and Alam Damai)
10.0	–		Ground	Cheras Sentral (Plaza Phoenix); Taman Connaught MRT station	Cheras Sental (Plaza Phoenix); P&R 9 Taman Connaught MRT station	Kuala Lumpur bound
Through to Cheras–Kajang Expressway / FT 1

== See also ==
- Federal route 1
- Kuala Lumpur–Rawang Highway
- Kuala Lumpur
