= Taman Midah =

Township in Kuala Lumpur, Malaysia

Coordinates: 3.100627°N 101.731996°E

- Township
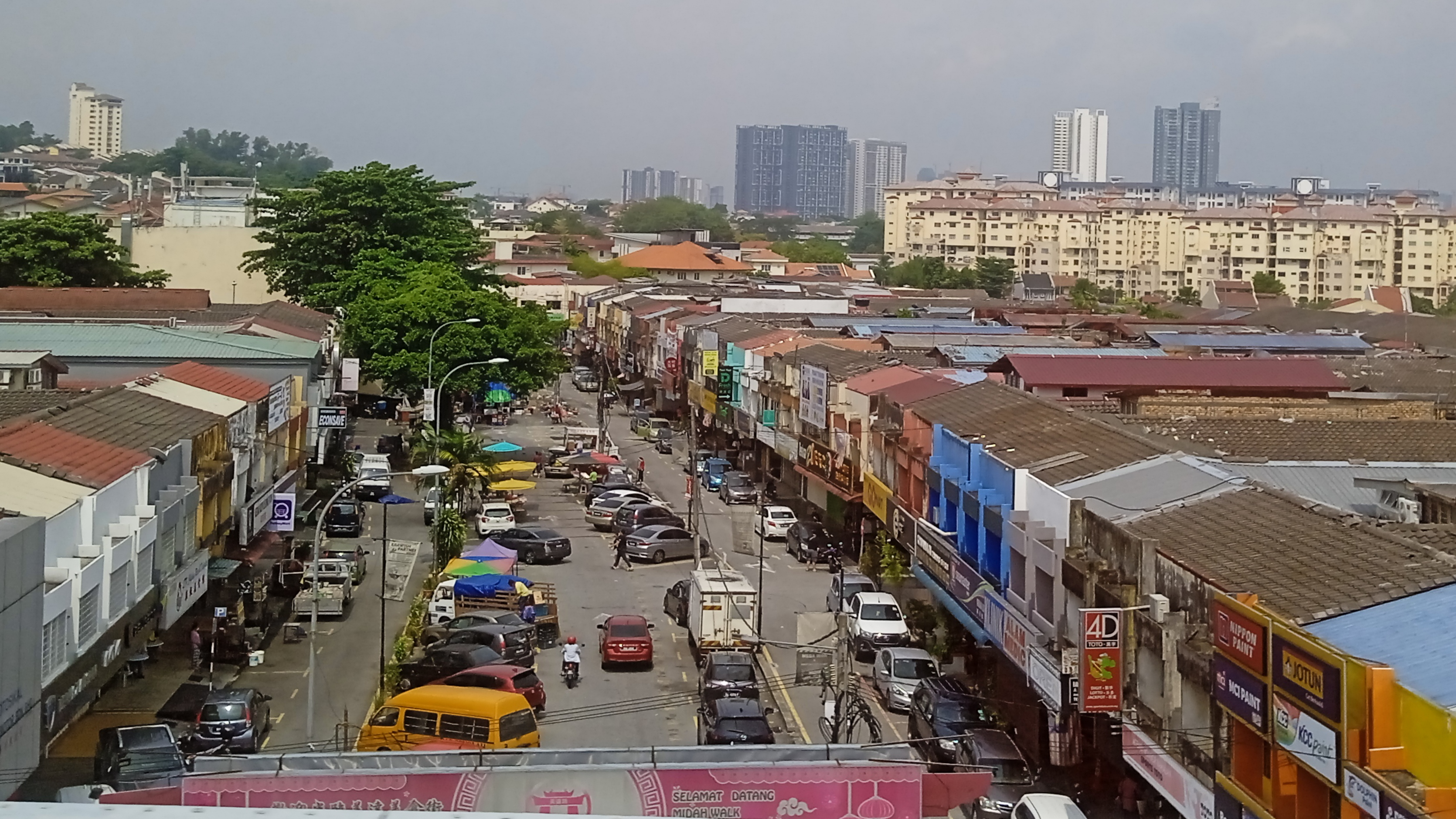
- Interactive map of Taman Midah
- Country: Malaysia
- State: Federal Territory of Kuala Lumpur
- Constituency: Cheras

Government
  - Local Authority: Dewan Bandaraya Kuala Lumpur
  - Mayor: Datuk Mahadi Che Ngah
- Time zone: UTC+8 (MST)
- Postcode: 56000
- Dialling code: +603
- Police: Cheras

Taman Midah (formerly known as Bolton Garden) is a 262-acre township in Cheras, Kuala Lumpur, Malaysia. The township took its name from the Midah River which flows into a small lake to the east.

== Location ==
Taman Midah is located 5 kilometers from Bukit Bintang in the centre of Kuala Lumpur. Its north-eastern boundary is formed by the main trunk road of Jalan Cheras, the south-eastern by the Kuala Lumpur Middle Ring Road 2. To its west is the Pusat Perubatan Universiti Kebangsaan Malaysia and the peaceful spaces of Taman Tasik Permaisuri (Lake Park). Running through the centre of the township is Jalan Midah Besar.

== History ==
The area was originally a rubber plantation known as the Bolton Estate. Originally an independent plantation, it was acquired by Bukit Kepong Estates Ltd on January 1, 1925. During the Malayan Emergency (1948 - 1960) the interior of the estate had the reputation of being a "hot bed of Communist activity". Bolton Rubber went into voluntary liquidation in 1964, after which the land was set aside for development. Bolton Properties (now known as Symphony Life Berhad) started developing the land as one of Kuala Lumpur's first townships in 1968, with occupancy of the housing and shop units beginning in mid 1970. Development carried on until the 1990s by Bolton Berhad .

== Character ==
Taman Midah is predominantly a residential township with a small number of commercial units. Some roads are characterised by late twentieth century link houses. Others feature expensive large detached homes (bungalows). There are also a small number of condominium complexes.

=== Sports and Recreational ===
Taman Tasik Permaisuri (Lake Park) is popular with joggers/runners from nearby areas. Both the Stadium Bolasepak Kuala Lumpur and Kompleks Renang Kuala Lumpur are adjacent to the park.

=== Health ===
Pusat Perubatan Universiti Kebangsaan Malaysia and Cheras Rehabilitation Hospital are located nearby along Jalan Yaacob Latif.

=== Shopping ===
Taman Midah has a range of traditional shops and a large Lotus's (formerly known as Tesco) supermarket. There is a morning market daily and a pasar malam each Saturday. Nearby are the increasingly popular shopping and eating areas of Cheras, including the Cheras Leisure Mall and the newly opened EkoCheras Mall.

== Connectivity ==
Taman Midah is well connected by both road and public transport links. Since 17 July 2017 it has been served by its KG24 own MRT station on the 9 Kajang Line. SP14 Bandar Tun Razak LRT station on the 4 Sri Petaling Line is located a short distance away. Also nearby is SP13 Salak Selatan LRT station on the 4 Sri Petaling Line (planned future interchange with MRT Circle Line), as well as KB03 Salak Selatan KTM Komuter station on the 1 KTM Komuter Seremban Line.

The major highways connecting the township are East–West Link Expressway (Salak Expressway), Kuala Lumpur Middle Ring Road 2, Cheras-Kajang Expressway and Shah Alam Expressway.

== Links ==
Taman Midah boundaries on Google Maps.
