= East–West Link Expressway =

Road in Malaysia

Expressway 37
- East–West Link Expressway; Lebuhraya Hubungan Timur–Barat 东西连贯大道
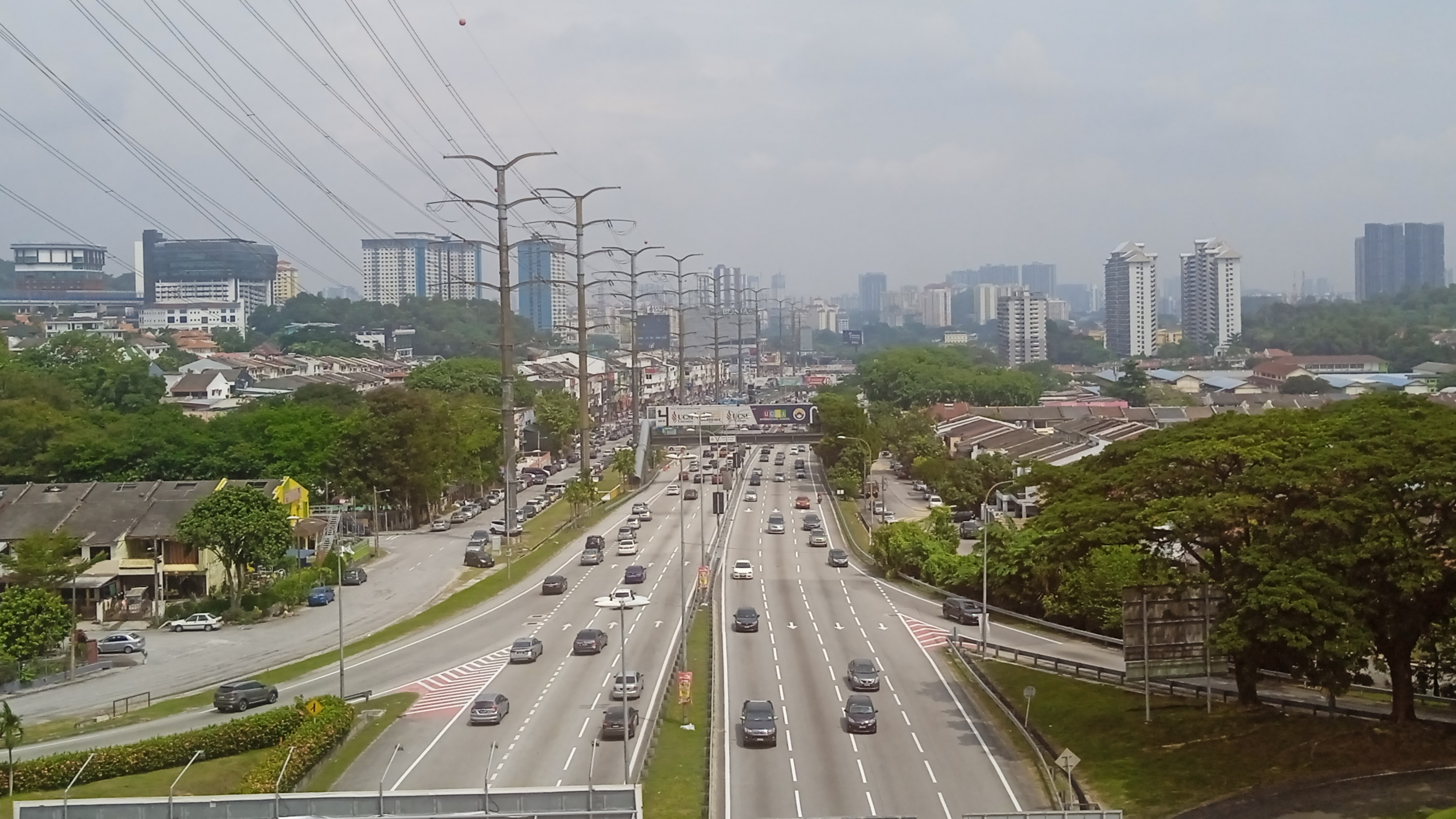

Route information
- Maintained by ANIH Berhad (formerly known as MetaCorp Sdn Bhd)
- Length: 13 km (8.1 mi)
- Existed: 1993–present
- History: Completed in 1995

Major junctions
- West end: Seputeh Interchange
- FT 2 Federal Highway; Kuala Lumpur–Seremban Expressway; Maju Expressway; Sungai Besi Expressway; Cheras–Kajang Expressway / FT 1 FT 1 Cheras Highway
- East end: Taman Connaught Interchange

Location
- Country: Malaysia
- Primary destinations: Cheras, Bandar Tun Razak, Taman Desa

Highway system
- Highways in Malaysia; Expressways; Federal; State

The East–West Link Expressway (Malay: Lebuhraya Hubungan Timur–Barat), also known as the Salak Expressway, is an extension of Malaysia's Federal Highway from Seputeh to Taman Connaught in Cheras. It should not be confused with the East–West Highway route 4 that runs from Gerik in Perak to Jeli in Kelantan. This expressway is part of the Kuala Lumpur Southeast Dispersal Link Scheme.

Some maps label the section of the expressway from Seputeh Interchange to Salak South Expressway as a part of the Federal Highway Route 2, but the appellation is incorrect as the East–West Link Expressway was acquired by ANIH Berhad (formerly known as Metramac Corporation Sdn Bhd (MetaCorp)) and not by the PLUS Malaysia Berhad which maintains most parts of the Federal Highway. In 2007, the expressway was coded as E37 with the Kuala Lumpur–Seremban Expressway.

The Kilometre Zero is located at Seputeh Interchange.

== History ==
The construction of the East–West Link Expressway started in 1993 and was completed in 1995. The expressway was opened on 17 August 1995. On 17 May 2011, the toll collections of the expressway from Salak Interchange to Taman Connaught Interchange were abolished.

On 7 April 2011, MetaCorp changed its name into ANIH Berhad after taking over the operations of Toll Concession from MTD Prime Sdn Bhd and MetaCorp who owned the concessions for Kuala Lumpur–Karak Expressway, East Coast Expressway Phase 1, and Kuala Lumpur–Seremban Expressway (including East–West Link Expressway) with effect from 6 December 2011.

== Features ==
- Taman Connaught Pasar Malam (night market) opens every Wednesday from 5:00 pm to 1:00 am. Illegal parking along the expressway is common, causing traffic congestion.

== Toll rates ==
Class	Type of vehicles	Rate (in Malaysian Ringgit (RM))
0	Motorcycles, bicycles or vehicles with 2 or less wheels	Free (starting 11 May 2011)
1	Vehicles with 2 axles and 3 or 4 wheels excluding taxis	Free (starting 11 May 2011)
2	Vehicles with 2 axles and 5 or 6 wheels excluding buses	Free (starting 11 May 2011)
3	Vehicles with 3 or more axles	Free (starting 11 May 2011)
4	Taxis	Free (starting 11 May 2011)
5	Buses	Free (starting 11 May 2011)

== Interchange lists ==
The entire expressway is located in Federal Territory of Kuala Lumpur.

Legend:

- I/C - Interchange, I/S - Intersection, RSA - Rest and service area, OBR - Overhead bridge restaurant, R/R - Restaurant and rest plaza, L/B - Layby, V/P - Vista point, TN - tunnel, T/P - Toll plaza, BR - Bridge
- C - Cloverleaf, S - Stack, T-A - Trumpet-A, T-B - Trumpet-B, DT - Directional-T/Y, SDT - Semi-Directional-T/Y, P-Y - Partial-Y, D - Diamond, P-C - Partial cloverleaf, D-D - Diverging diamond, D-R - Direct ramp

km	Exit	Name	Destinations	Notes
Through to FT 2 Federal Highway
	37--	Seputeh I/C	FT 2 Jalan Syed Putra – City Centre, Brickfields, KL Sentral, Mid Valley Megamall; FT 2 Jalan Klang Lama – Kuchai Lama, Taman OUG, Puchong	Stacked interchange
0.0	–	Seputeh Komuter station	Seputeh Komuter station KTM Komuter	
2.5	37--	Taman Desa I/C	Jalan Desa Bakti – Taman Desa	Trumpet interchange
3.0	37--	Salak I/C	Kuala Lumpur–Seremban Expressway – City Centre, Kompleks Sukan Negara; SMART Tunnel – Bukit Bintang, Imbi, Jalan Tun Razak; North–South Expressway Southern Route / AH2 – Kuala Lumpur International Airport, Seremban, Malacca, Johor Bahru	Cloverleaf interchange
	BR	Sungai Kerayong bridge		
3.9	37--	Salak South-MEX I/C	Maju Expressway – Seri Kembangan, Putrajaya, Cyberjaya, Kuala Lumpur International Airport (KLIA)	
4.0	37--	Salak South I/C	Sungai Besi Expressway – Kuala Lumpur City Centre, Salak South, Ampang, Pandan Indah, Ulu Klang, Kuantan, Kuchai Lama, Sungai Besi, Seri Kembangan, Balakong, Kajang, KTM Komuter Salak Selatan Komuter station KB03	Diamond interchange
4.0	–	Former Salak toll plaza location		
5.8	BR	Railway crossing bridge		
5.9	37--	Bandar Sri Permaisuri Exit	Jalan Bandar Sri Permaisuri – Bandar Sri Permaisuri, Taman Tasik Permaisuri	Cheras bound
6.0	L/B	Petronas Shell L/B	Petronas Shell L/B – Petronas Shell	Seputeh bound
6.0	–	Former Bandar Tun Razak toll plaza location		
6.9	37--	Bandar Tun Razak I/C	Persiaran Mewah – Bandar Tun Razak, Hospital Universiti Kebangsaan Malaysia (HUKM) , 4 Bandar Tun Razak LRT station SP14 , Bandar Tun Razak Industrial Area; FT 28 Kuala Lumpur Middle Ring Road 2 – Bandar Tasik Selatan, Bandar Tasik Selatan station, Sungai Besi, KL Sports City, Seremban, Johor Bahru, Subang Jaya, Shah Alam, Putrajaya, Kuala Lumpur International Airport (KLIA)	Diamond interchange
7.1		TF Value Mart Cheras	TF Value Mart Cheras	Seputeh bound
7.2	L/B	Taman Connaught L/B	Taman Connaught L/B – McDonald's Shell TF Value Mart Cheras	Seputeh bound
7.4	37--	Taman Connaught Exit	Jalan Cerdas – Taman Connaught, Taman Connaught Pasar Malam (Night Market)	Seputeh bound Note: Jalan Cerdas, closed every Wednesdays during, Taman Connaught Pasar Malam, activities from 5:00 pm to 1:00 am, No Parking zone
8.0	37--	Taman Connaught I/C	Cheras Sentral Flyover – Taman Connaught, Taman Len Seng, Alam Damai, Cheras Sentral; FT 1 Cheras Highway – Kuala Lumpur City Centre, Cheras, Pandan Indah, Ampang, Ulu Kelang, Genting Highlands, Kuantan; Cheras–Kajang Expressway / FT 1 – Hulu Langat, Kajang, Semenyih, Seremban; Sungai Besi–Ulu Klang Elevated Expressway – Ampang, Ulu Kelang	Trumpet interchange with dedicated flyover to major townships in Cheras, (Taman Connaught, Taman Len Seng and Alam Damai).
