= Taman Midah MRT station =

MRT station in Kuala Lumpur, Malaysia

KG24 CC23 Taman Midah
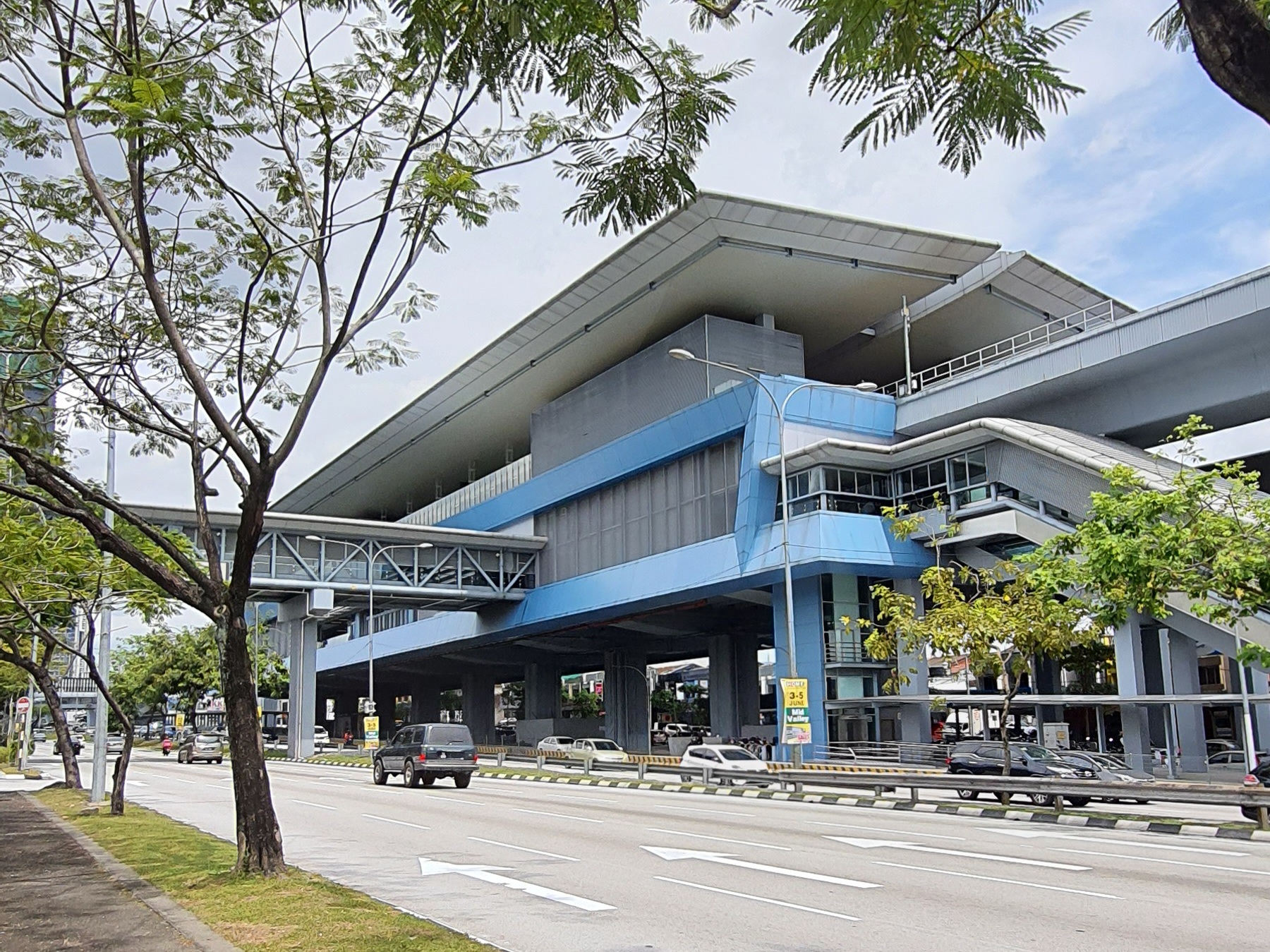
- Street view of the MRT station

General information
- Other names: Malay: تامن ميده (Jawi); Chinese: 美达花园; Tamil: தாமான் மிடா
- Location: Cheras Highway, Taman Midah, Cheras; 55300 Kuala Lumpur; Malaysia
- Coordinates: 3°06′16.2″N 101°43′55.9″E
- System: Rapid KL
- Owner: MRT Corp
- Operator: Rapid Rail
- Lines: 9 Kajang Line; 13 Circle Line (future)
- Platforms: 2 side platforms
- Tracks: 2

Construction
- Structure type: Elevated
- Parking: Available with payment. 1,355 car parking lots and 259 motorcycle parking lots.
- Cycle facilities: Not available
- Accessible: Yes

Other information
- Status: Operational
- Station code: KG24 CC23

History
- Opened: 17 July 2017; 9 years ago (Kajang Line)
- Opening: 2032; 6 years' time (Circle Line)
- Former names: Taman Bukit Mewah

Services
Preceding station		Following station
Taman Pertama towards Kwasa Damansara	Kajang Line	Taman Mutiara towards Kajang
Jalan Yaacob Latif Clockwise / outer	Circle Line Future service	Taman Cheras Anticlockwise / inner
Location

The Taman Midah MRT station is a mass rapid transit (MRT) elevated station on the MRT Kajang Line, serving the neighbourhood of Taman Midah and the surrounding residential areas in the suburb of Cheras, Kuala Lumpur, Malaysia. It was opened on 17 July 2017.

During the planning stages of the Klang Valley MRT project, the station was given the working name Taman Bukit Mewah, after the neighbouring residential area, before its name was finalised as Taman Midah in November 2014 when MRT Corp announced the final names of all 31 stations on the line. The station was opened as part of Phase Two of the MRT Kajang Line, which commenced operations on 17 July 2017 and completed the full end to end service between Kwasa Sentral and Kajang. The neighbourhood it serves, Taman Midah, takes its name from the Midah River and was formerly known as Bolton Garden, having been developed from 1968 on land that was originally the Bolton Estate rubber plantation.

The station is located directly above the Cheras Highway (Jalan Cheras) near the site of the former Jalan Cheras toll plaza.

The station is planned as a future interchange with the upcoming MRT Circle Line of the KVMRT project.

== Station Background ==
=== Station Layout ===
The station has a layout and design similar to that of most other elevated stations on the line (except the terminus and underground stations), with the platform level on the topmost floor, consisting of two sheltered side platforms along a double tracked line and a single concourse housing ticketing facilities between the ground level and the platform level. Lifts, stairways and escalators link all levels.

L2	Platform Level	Side platform
L2	Platform Level	Platform 1: 9 Kajang Line towards KG35 Kajang (→)
L2	Platform Level	Platform 2: 9 Kajang Line towards KG04 Kwasa Damansara (←)
L2	Platform Level	Side platform
L1	Concourse	Faregates, ticketing machines; customer service office; station control; retail shops
G	Ground Level	Entrances A and B, Feeder Bus Stops, Taxi and E-hailing lay-by, Jalan Cheras

=== Exits and entrances ===
The station has two entrances, located on both sides of Cheras Highway. Each entrance has a separate feeder bus service line.

Kajang Line station
Entrance	Location	Destination	Picture
A	West side of Cheras Highway (Jalan Cheras)	Feeder bus stop, taxi and private vehicle lay-by, Jalan Midah 1, Maybank (Taman Midah Branch), RHB Bank (Taman Midah Branch), Hong Leong Bank (Taman Midah Branch), AFFIN Bank (Taman Midah Branch), DHL Service Point Taman Midah	
B	East side of Cheras Highway (Jalan Cheras)	Feeder bus stop, taxi and private vehicle lay-by, Shell (Jalan Cheras), McDonalds (Jalan Cheras), Xiao En Centre, Toyota Malaysia 3S Centre Cheras	

== Bus Services ==
=== MRT Feeder Bus Services ===
With the opening of the MRT Kajang Line, feeder buses also began operating linking the station with several housing and commercial areas around the Bandar Tun Razak, Bandar Sri Permaisuri, Taman Midah, Taman Sri Bahtera, Kampung Cheras Baru, Pandan, Ampang and Sri Nilam areas.

The feeder bus lines in this station operate at each of the entrances.

Route No.	Origin	Destination	Via
T402	KG24 Taman Midah (Entrance A)	SP13 Salak Selatan	FT 1 Cheras Highway (Jalan Cheras); Jalan Yaacob Latif; Klinik Kesihatan Cheras; Hospital Canselor Tuanku Muhriz UKM; Kuala Lumpur Stadium; Taman Tasik Permaisuri; Bandar Sri Permaisuri; Taman Jaya; Taman Midah; Lotus's Cheras
T305	KG24 Taman Midah (Entrance B)	Hub Sri Nilam; Bandar Baru Ampang	Jalan Kuari; Taman Sri Bahtera; Kampung Cheras Baru; Taman Muda; Taman Seraya; Taman Melur; Pandan Mewah; Paragon Point; Ampang Hospital; Ampang Avenue; FT 1 Cheras Highway (Jalan Cheras); KG24 Taman Midah (Entrance A)

=== Other Bus Services ===
The MRT Taman Midah station also provides accessibility for some other bus services.

Route No.	Operator	Origin	Destination	Via	Notes
450	Rapid KL	Hentian Kajang	Hub Lebuh Pudu	Reko Sentral; Bandar Kajang; KG34 Stadium Kajang; KG33 Sungai Jernih; Sungai Sekamat; Simpang Balak; KG31 Bukit Dukung; Cheras–Kajang Expressway; Jalan Hulu Langat; Batu 9 Cheras / Taman Suntex; Cheras Sentral / KG26 Taman Connaught; FT 1 Cheras Highway (Jalan Cheras); KG24 Taman Midah (Entrance A); AG13 KG22 Maluri; Jalan Pasar; Jalan Pudu	For KL-bound only. The Kajang-bound buses may not stop here. Kajang-bound buses will always stop at KG25 Taman Mutiara, at the bus stop near Leisure Mall.
400	Rapid KL	Damai Perdana	Hub Lebuh Pudu	Taman Desa Baiduri; Alam Damai; FT 1 Cheras Highway (Jalan Cheras); KG24 Taman Midah (Entrance A); AG13 KG22 Maluri; Jalan Pudu; Berjaya Times Square / MR5 Imbi; KG18A Bukit Bintang; MR6 Bukit Bintang; Jalan Raja Chulan; Jalan Tun H.S. Lee	For KL-bound only. The Kajang-bound buses may not stop here. Kajang-bound buses will always stop at KG25 Taman Mutiara, at the bus stop near Leisure Mall.

== Park and Ride ==
Taman Midah MRT station has an adjoining multi-level park and ride facility, located adjacent to Maybank (Taman Midah Branch) and is connected to Entrance A via a covered pedestrian link bridge. This facility has 1,355 car parking lots and 259 motorcycle parking lots. MRT users are charged a flat rate per entry per day; RM4.30 for car and RM1.10 for motorcycle. Parking payment must be made using the same Touch 'n' Go card used for the MRT ride in order to enjoy the flat rate.
