= Taman Mutiara MRT station =

MRT station in Kuala Lumpur, Malaysia

Coordinates: 3°12′23″N 101°34′49″E

KG25 Taman Mutiara
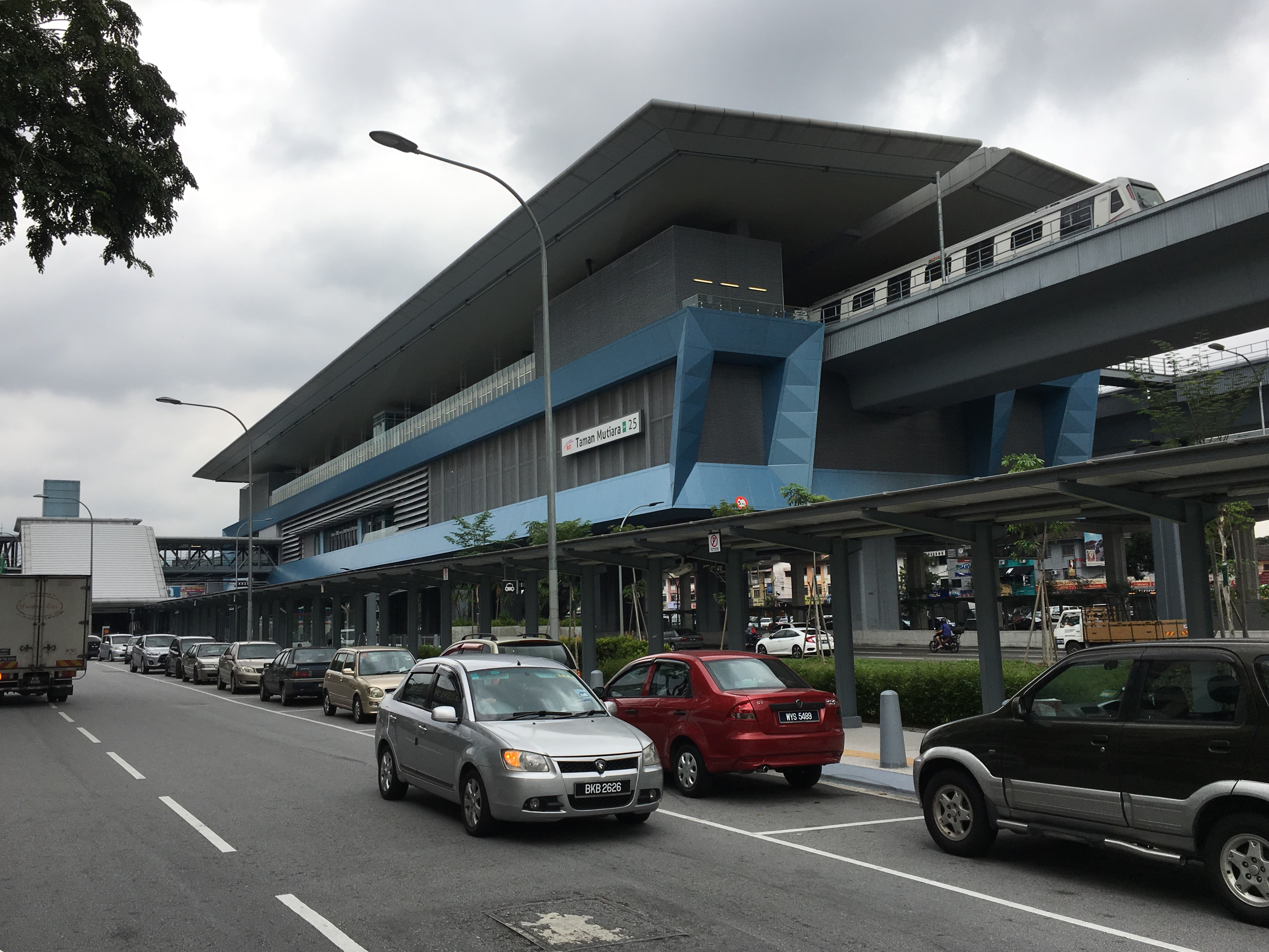
- Exterior of the station as viewed from Jalan Cheras.

General information
- Other names: Malay: تامن موتيارا (Jawi); Chinese: 珍珠花园; Tamil: தாமான் முத்தியாரா
- Location: Cheras Highway (Jalan Cheras), Taman Mutiara, Cheras; 56100 Kuala Lumpur; Malaysia
- System: Rapid KL
- Owner: MRT Corp
- Operator: Rapid Rail
- Line: 9 Kajang Line
- Platforms: 2 side platforms
- Tracks: 3

Construction
- Structure type: Elevated
- Parking: Available. 10 parking bays on each side near the overhead bridges.
- Cycle facilities: Not available
- Accessible: Yes

Other information
- Station code: KG25

History
- Opened: 17 July 2017; 9 years ago
- Former names: Leisure Mall

Services
Preceding station		Following station
Taman Midah towards Kwasa Damansara	Kajang Line	Taman Connaught towards Kajang
Location

The Taman Mutiara MRT station is an elevated mass rapid transit station in Cheras in south-eastern Kuala Lumpur, Malaysia. It is located above the Cheras Highway (also known as Jalan Cheras and part of Malaysia Federal Route 1), next to the Cheras Leisure Mall and EkoCheras Mall. The station was given the working name Leisure Mall station during construction.

The station serves the neighbouring residential areas such as Taman Cheras Makmur (Taman Yulek), Taman Desa Aman, Taman Mutiara Barat, Taman Mutiara Timur, Taman Segar, Taman Taynton View and Taman Bukit Hijau.

The station is on the MRT Kajang Line and was opened on 17 July 2017, along with 19 stations under Phase 2 operations of the line.

== Station background ==
=== Station Layout ===
The station has a layout and design similar to that of most other elevated stations on the line (except the termini), with the platform level on the topmost floor, consisting of two sheltered side platforms along a double tracked line and a single concourse housing ticketing facilities between the ground level and the platform level. Lifts, stairways and escalators link all levels.

L2	Platform Level	Side platform
L2	Platform Level	Platform 1: 9 Kajang Line towards KG35 Kajang (→)
L2	Platform Level	Platform 2: 9 Kajang Line towards KG04 Kwasa Damansara (←)
L2	Platform Level	Side platform
L1	Concourse	Faregates, Ticketing Machines, Customer Service Office, Station Control, Shops, pedestrian linkway to Leisure Mall via Entrance C and Eko Cheras Mall
G	Ground Level	Entrances A and B, Feeder Bus Stops, Taxi and E-hailing lay-by, Jalan Cheras

=== Exits and entrances ===
The station has three entrances (exclusive of linkways). The feeder buses operate from the station's feeder bus hub via Entrance B within the station area. There are linkways which provide access to the Cheras Leisure Mall and EkoCheras Mall on either side of the Cheras Highway. Entrances B and C are located on the Leisure Mall side.

Kajang Line station
Entrance	Location	Destination	Picture
A	West side of Cheras Highway (Jalan Cheras) / Jalan Mutiara Raya	Taxi and E-hailing lay-by, Taman Mutiara	
B	East side of Cheras Highway (Jalan Cheras) / Jalan Mutiara Timur	Feeder Bus Hub, Taxi and E-hailing lay-by, Leisure Mall, Taman Segar	
C	Jalan Manis 5	Direct walkway to Cheras Leisure Mall (Stairs only) Linkable to Entrances A and B, as well as both sides of Cheras Highway	
Leisure Mall Linkway	Cheras Leisure Mall 2nd Floor	Cheras Leisure Mall	
EkoCheras Linkway	EkoCheras Mall 1st Floor	EkoCheras Shopping Mall	

== Bus Services ==
=== Feeder Bus Services ===
With the opening of the MRT Kajang Line, feeder buses also began operating, linking the station with several housing and commercial areas around Cheras Hartamas, Taman Segar, Persiaran Awana, Persiaran Lemak, Kampung Cheras Baru and the Jalan Kuari area. The feeder buses operate from the station's feeder bus hub at Entrance B of the station.

Route No.	Origin	Destination	Via
T408	KG25 Taman Mutiara	Taman Segar Pertama	FT 1 Cheras Highway (Jalan Cheras); Jalan Cheras Hartamas; Jalan Bukit Segar Jaya; Jalan Segar Pertama; Persiaran Awana
T409	KG25 Taman Mutiara	Taman Supreme / Ketumbar Hill	FT 1 Cheras Highway (Jalan Cheras); Persiaran Lemak; Jalan Jintan; Jalan Ketumbas; Jalan Kuari

=== Other Bus Services ===
The MRT station is also served by other bus services.

Route No.	Operator	Origin	Destination	Via	Notes
450	Rapid KL	Hentian Kajang	Pasar Seni	Reko Sentral; Bandar Kajang; KG34 Stadium Kajang; KG33 Sungai Jernih Sungai Sekamat; Simpang Balak; KG31 Bukit Dukung; Cheras–Kajang Expressway; Jalan Hulu Langat Batu 9 Cheras / Taman Suntex; Cheras Sentral / KG26 Taman Connaught; FT 1 Cheras Highway (Jalan Cheras); KG25 Taman Mutiara / Leisure Mall; KG24 Taman Midah; AG13 KG22 Maluri; Jalan Cheras; Jalan Pasar; Jalan Pudu	The KL-bound bus stop is 250 m away from the station. The Kajang-bound bus stop is 200 m away from the station (Linkable via Entrance C).
400	Rapid KL	Damai Perdana	Pasar Seni	Taman Desa Baiduri; Alam Damai; FT 1 Cheras Highway (Jalan Cheras); KG25 Taman Mutiara / Leisure Mall; KG24 Taman Midah; AG13 KG22 Maluri; Jalan Cheras; Jalan Pudu; Berjaya Times Square / MR5 Imbi; MR6 Bukit Bintang / KG18A Bukit Bintang; Jalan Raja Chulan; Jalan Tun H.S. Lee	The KL-bound bus stop is 250 m away from the station. The Kajang-bound bus stop is 200 m away from the station (Linkable via Entrance C).

== Incidents ==
A woman was attacked and robbed by a man wearing a black t-shirt and jeans in one of the lifts at the station, and the 56-second video of the incident, caught by CCTV at the station, went viral on social media.

On 14 April 2024, a fire broke out at the communications room, forcing the closure of the station, and trains were programmed to skip it.

== Nearby ==
- UCSI University
- Cheras Plaza (Neway Karaoke & Tai Thong Restaurant)
- Cheras Leisure Mall
- EkoCheras Mall

== Gallery ==
=== Station ===
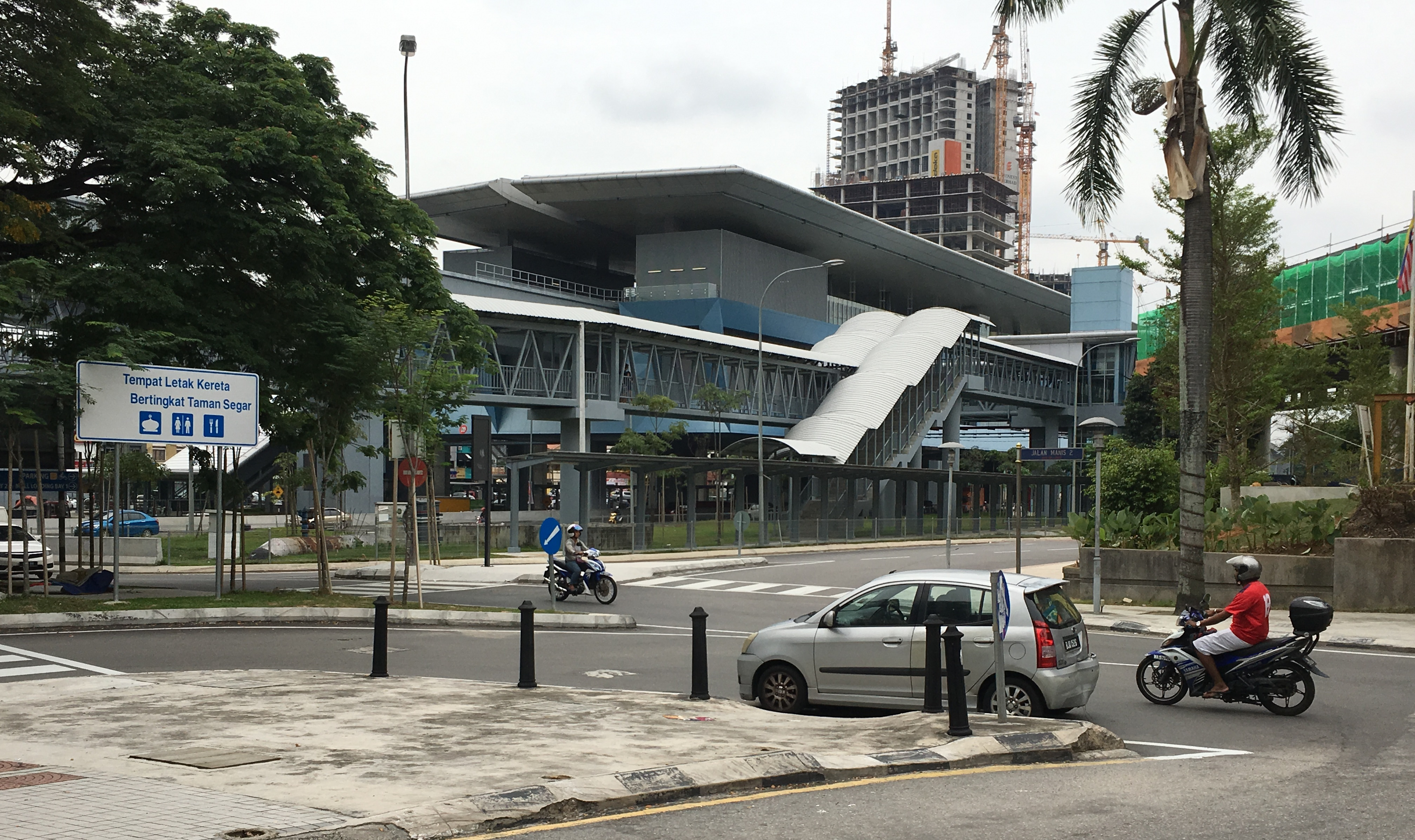
View of the station from Taman Segar.

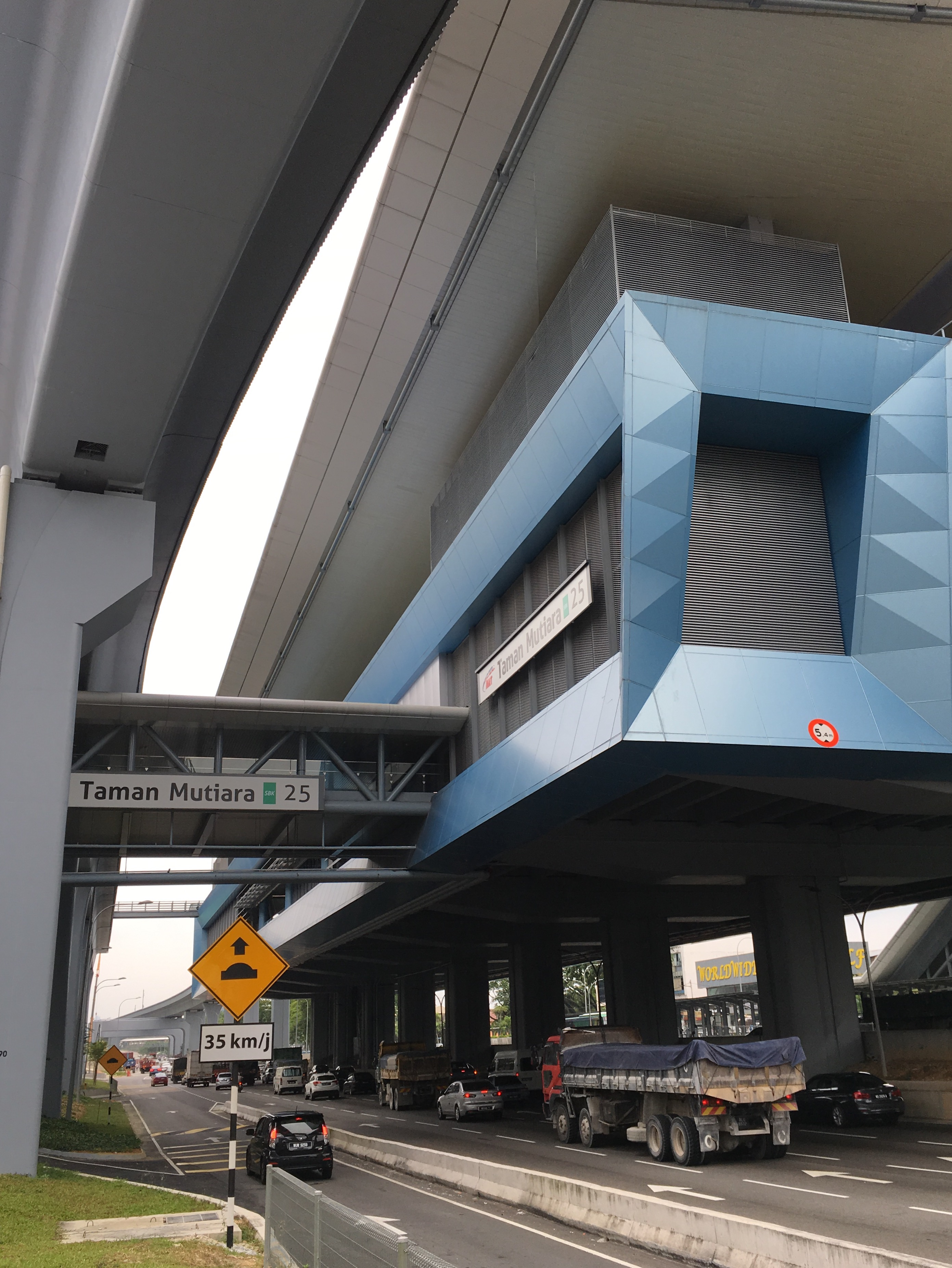
The station above Jalan Cheras, looking north.

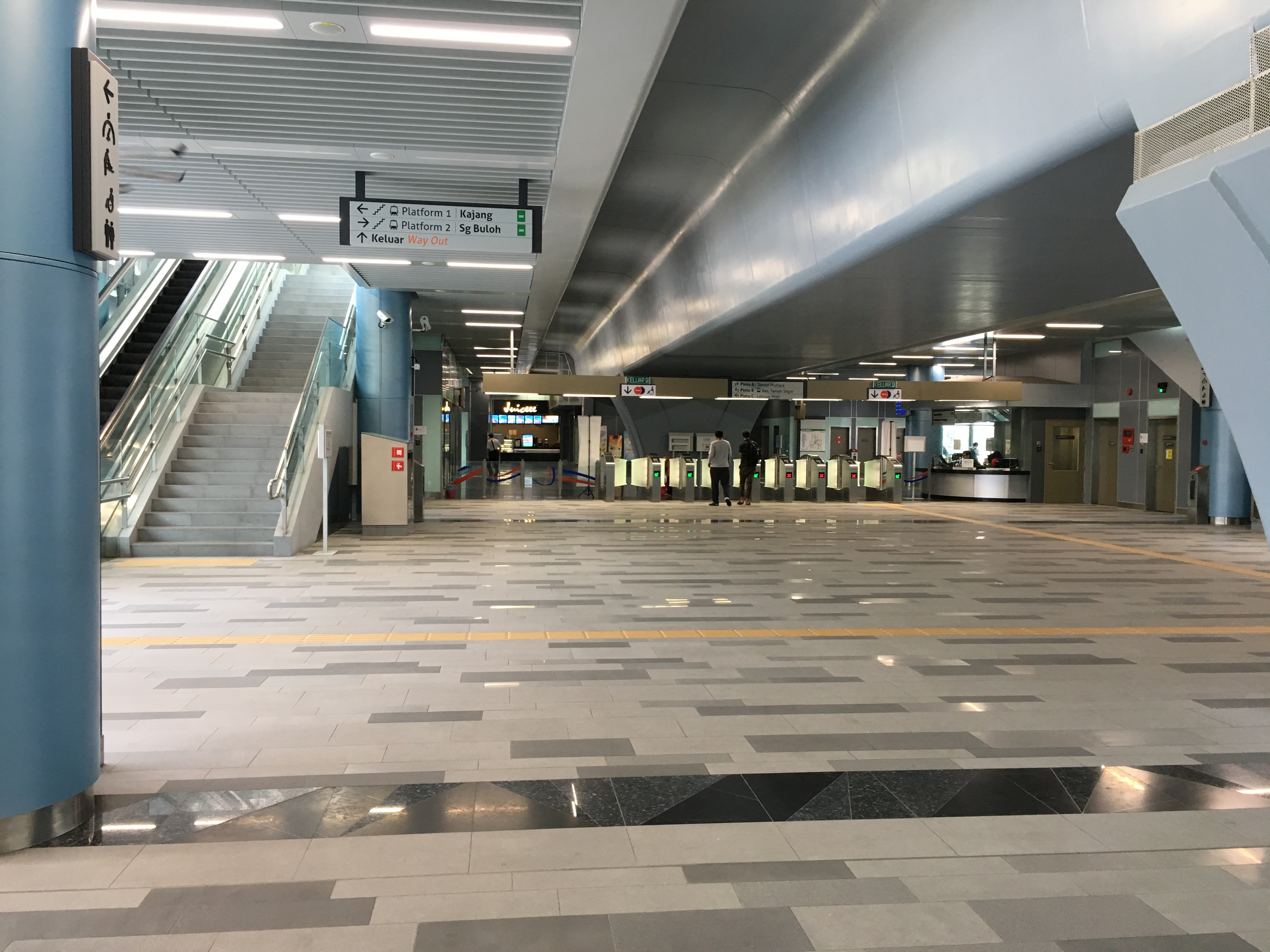
Concourse level of the station.

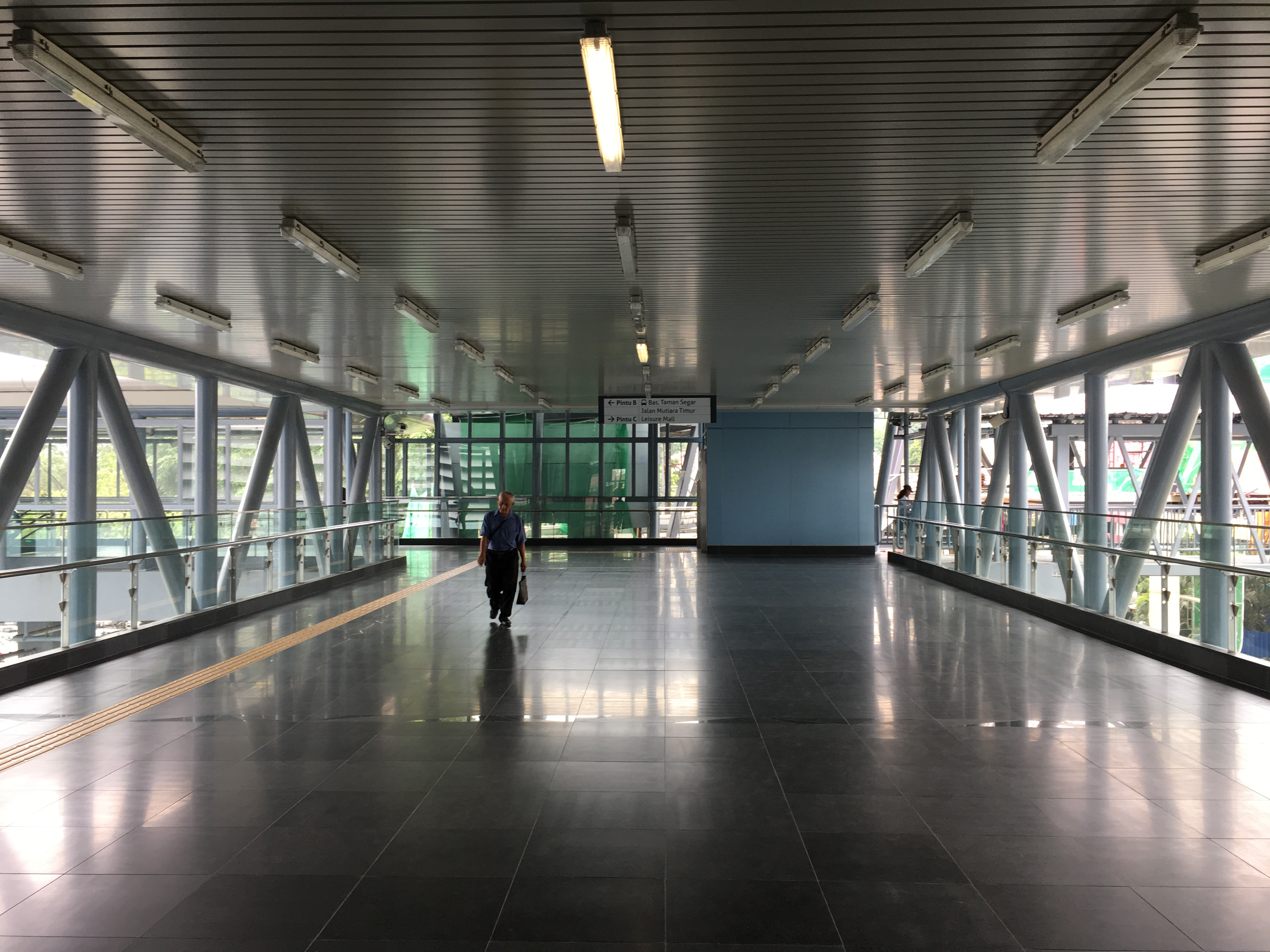
Concourse level towards Entrance B.

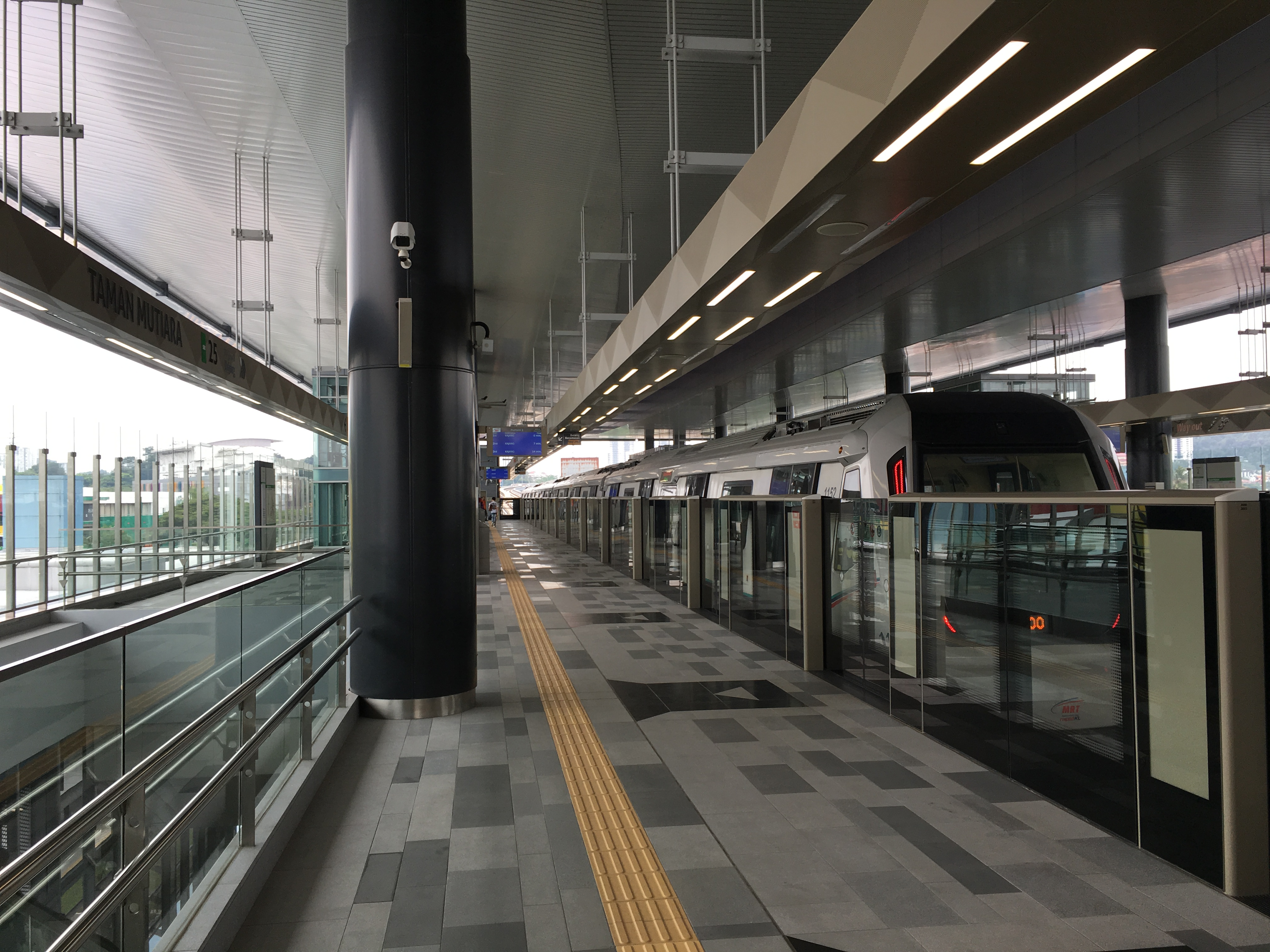
Platform level of station.

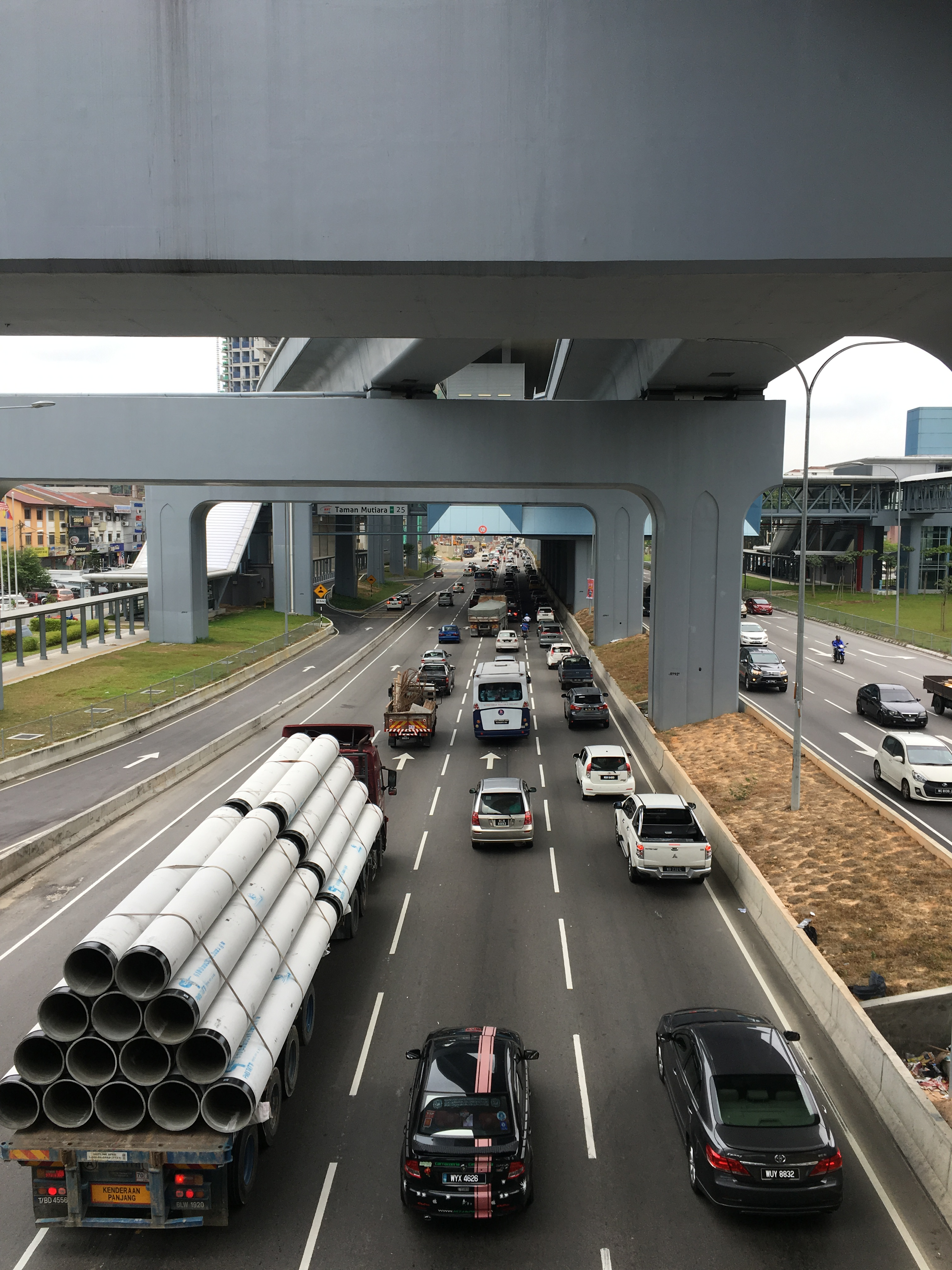
The busy Jalan Cheras beneath the station.

=== Entrances and access ===
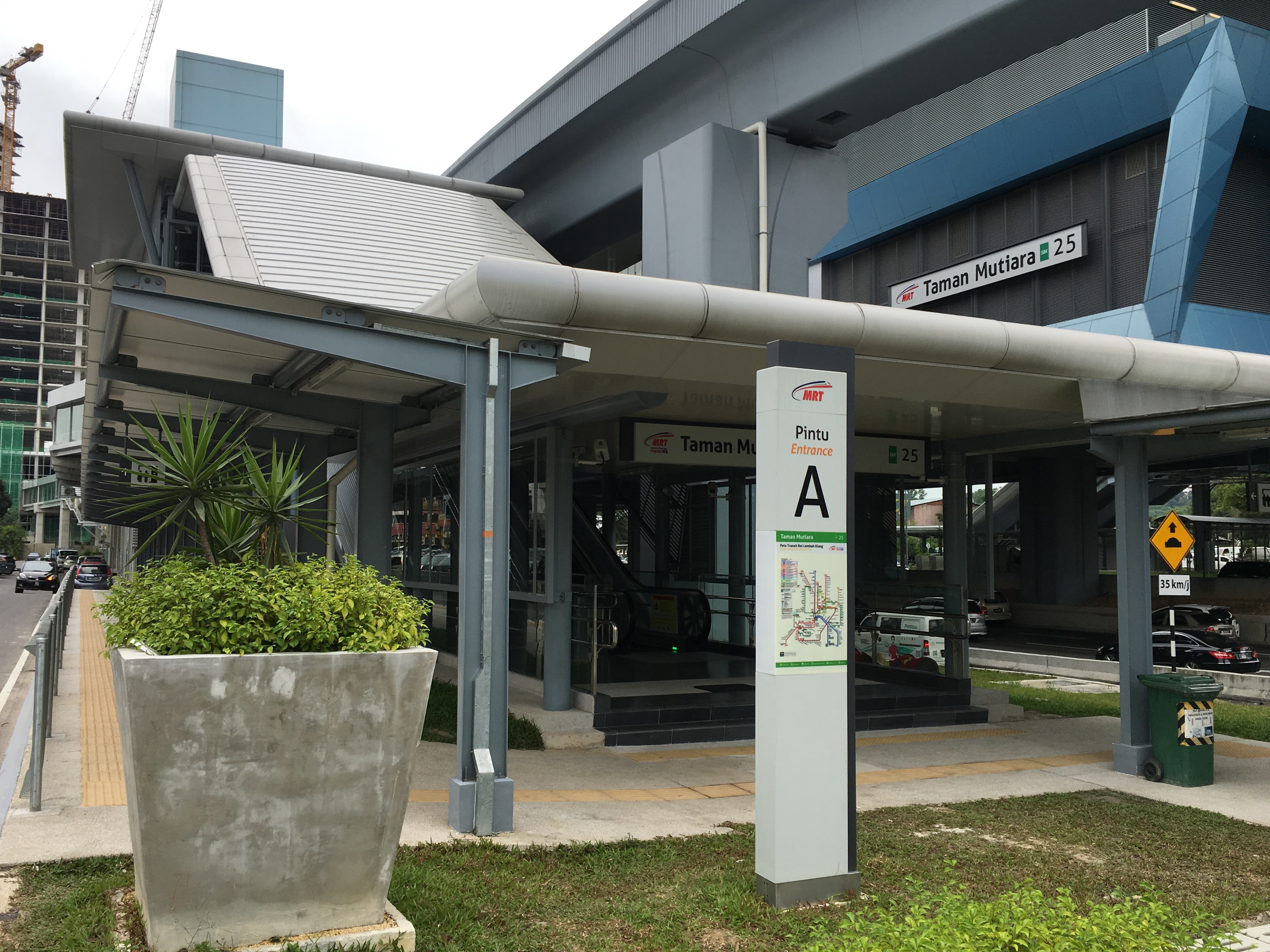
Entrance A of the station.

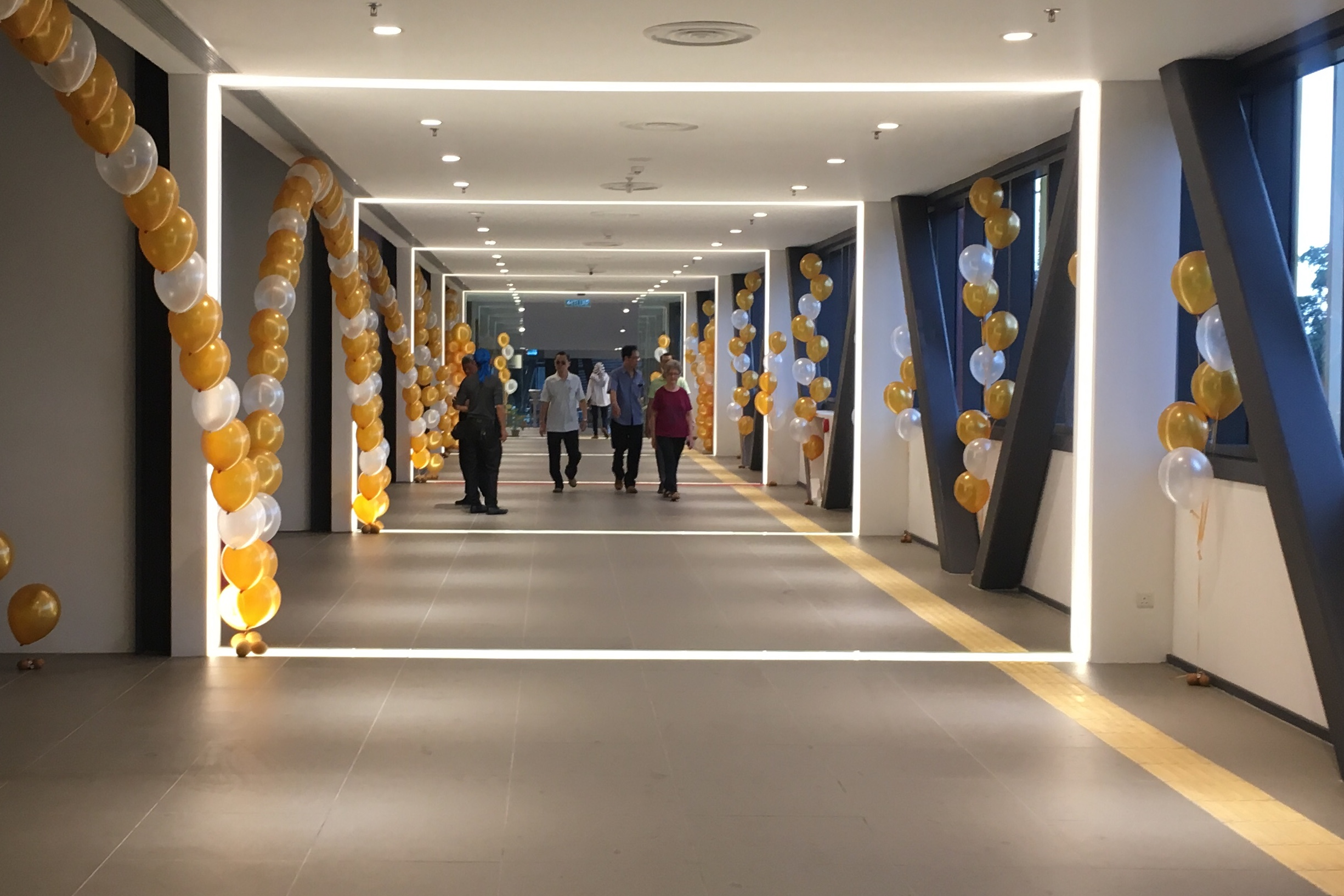
View inside the Cheras Leisure Mall pedestrian link bridge.

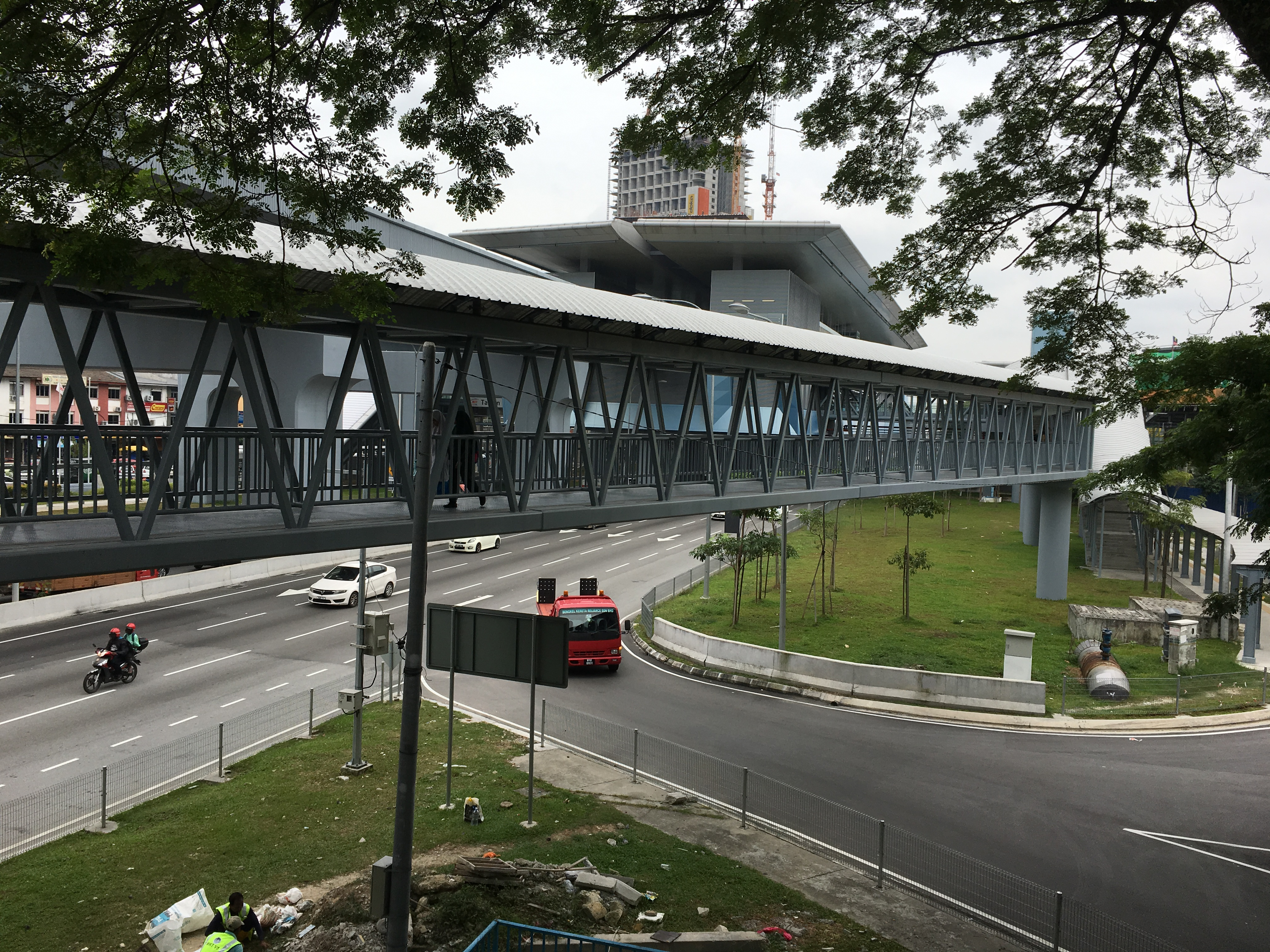
Link bridges connecting the station with adjacent buildings.

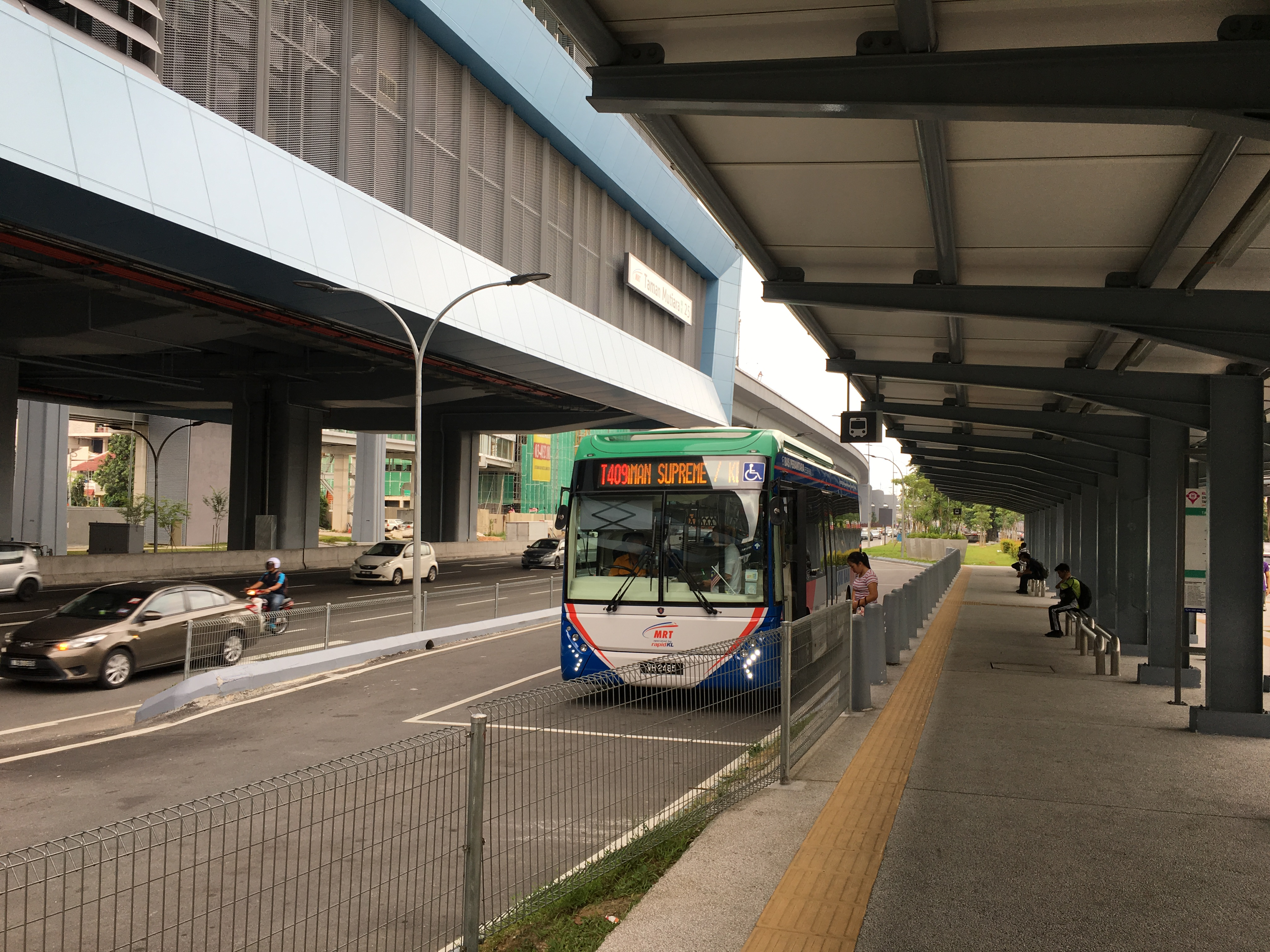
Feeder bus stop at Jalan Cheras.

== See also ==
- MRT Kajang Line
- Cheras
