= Alam Damai =

Neighborhood in Federal Territory of Kuala Lumpur

Coordinates: 3°03′51″N 101°44′34″E

Alam Damai is a suburb in Bandar Tun Razak, Kuala Lumpur, Malaysia. It is located between Taman Connaught, Bandar Damai Perdana and Taman Len Seng. The town has nine sections: Damai Jaya, Damai Rasa, Damai Kasih, Damai Murni, Damai Budi, Damai Bakti, Damai Impian, Damai Citra and Damai Bestari.
