= Taman Connaught MRT station =

MRT station in Kuala Lumpur, Malaysia

KG26 Taman Connaught
- Overview of the station.

General information
- Other names: Malay: تامن كونوت (Jawi); Chinese: 康乐花园; Tamil: தாமான் கோனாட்
- Location: Kajang-bound carriageway of the Cheras Highway, Taman Connaught, Cheras, 56100 Kuala Lumpur; Malaysia
- Coordinates: 3°12′23″N 101°34′49″E
- System: Rapid KL
- Owner: MRT Corp
- Operator: Rapid Rail
- Line: 9 Kajang Line
- Platforms: 2 side platforms
- Tracks: 2
- Connections: Link bridge to Cheras Sentral mall.

Construction
- Structure type: Elevated
- Parking: Available
- Cycle facilities: Not available
- Accessible: Yes

Other information
- Station code: KG26

History
- Opened: 17 July 2017; 9 years ago
- Former names: Plaza Phoenix

Services
Preceding station		Following station
Taman Mutiara towards Kwasa Damansara	Kajang Line	Taman Suntex towards Kajang
Location

The Taman Connaught MRT station is an elevated mass rapid transit station on the MRT Kajang Line, located in Taman Connaught, in the subdistrict of Cheras in southeastern Kuala Lumpur, Malaysia. Its exact location is next to the Cheras Sentral shopping mall, where the southern end of the Cheras Highway (Federal Route 1, also known as Jalan Cheras) meets the northern end of the Cheras-Kajang Expressway (CKE), close to the Kuala Lumpur-Selangor state border.

The station is also near the Cheras-Kajang Interchange of the Sungai Besi–Ulu Klang Elevated Expressway (SUKE). The elevated expressway was built even higher above the road than the already towering MRT tracks.

It was opened on 17 July 2017, along with 19 adjoining stations (from Muzium Negara to Kajang) as part of Phase 2 of the system.

The station was provisionally named Phoenix Plaza station during construction. Plaza Phoenix was the former name of the Cheras Sentral shopping centre.

== Station Background ==
=== Station Layout ===
The station has a layout and design similar to that of most other elevated stations on the line (except the termini), with the platform level on the topmost floor, consisting of two sheltered side platforms along a double tracked railway line and a single concourse housing ticketing facilities between the ground level and the platform level. Lifts, stairways and escalators link all levels.

L2	Platform Level	Side platform
L2	Platform Level	Platform 1: 9 Kajang Line towards KG35 Kajang (→)
L2	Platform Level	Platform 2: 9 Kajang Line towards KG04 Kwasa Damansara (←)
L2	Platform Level	Side platform
L1	Concourse	Faregates, Ticketing Machines, Customer Service Office, Station Control, Shops, pedestrian linkway to Cheras Sentral and Entrance C
L1	Entrance C	Feeder Bus Stop, Taxi and E-hailing lay-by, Jalan 3/144A
G	Ground Level	Entrances A and B, Feeder Bus Stops, Taxi and E-hailing lay-by, Jalan Cheras

=== Exits and entrances ===
The station has three entrances - Entrance A and Entrance B on either side of the Cheras Highway (Jalan Cheras), and Entrance C on Jalan 3/144A inside Taman Connaught. A link bridge also connects the station via the link bridges to Entrance A and Entrance C with the Cheras Sentral shopping mall.

Each entrance has a separate feeder bus service line.

Kajang Line station
Entrance	Location	Destination	Picture
A	West side of Jalan Cheras	Feeder bus stop, Cheras Sentral Shopping Mall (Ground Floor), Silka Cheras Hotel	
B	East side of Jalan Cheras	Feeder bus stop	
C	North side of Jalan 3/114A	Feeder bus stop, Cheria Heights Apartments	
Cheras Sentral Linkway	Cheras Sentral 3rd Floor	Cheras Sentral Shopping Mall	

== Bus Services ==
=== Feeder Bus Services ===
With the opening of the MRT Kajang Line, feeder buses also began operating linking the station with several housing areas around the Taman Connaught, Sungai Besi, Cheras Awana and Alam Damai areas.

Feeder bus lines at this station operate at each of the entrances.

Route No.	Origin	Destination	Via
T410	KG26 Taman Connaught (Entrance A)	KB04 SP15 KT2 Bandar Tasik Selatan and returns to KG26 Taman Connaught (Entrance B)	East–West Link Expressway; Desa Tun Razak; Taman Taynton View
T411	KG26 Taman Connaught (Entrance B)	Taman Cheras Awana	Cheras–Kajang Expressway; Jalan Medan Masria; Jalan Coop Cuepacs JB; Persiaran Awana; FT 1 Cheras Highway (Jalan Cheras)
T412	KG26 Taman Connaught (Entrance C)	Alam Damai	Jalan 1/144A; Jalan 2/154; Jalan Desa Cheras; Persiaran Alam Damai; Jalan Alam Damai

=== Other Bus Services ===
The MRT station also is also served by other bus services.

Route No.	Operator	Origin	Destination	Via	Notes
450	Rapid KL	Hentian Kajang	Hub Lebuh Pudu	Reko Sentral; Bandar Kajang; KG34 Stadium Kajang; KG31 Bukit Dukung; Jalan Hulu Langat; Batu 9 Cheras / Taman Suntex; Cheras Sentral / KG26 Taman Connaught; FT 1 Cheras Highway (Jalan Cheras); KG24 Taman Midah; AG13 KG22 Maluri; Jalan Cheras; Jalan Pasar; Jalan Pudu	For KL-bound only. The bus stops at the Cheras Sentral bus stop.

== Planned Interchange ==
Taman Connaught station, or rather Plaza Phoenix station, was initially planned to be an interchange between the MRT Kajang Line and the MRT Putrajaya Line when the MRT lines were first announced. The alignment was eventually changed and the interchange was changed to the Tun Razak Exchange station instead.
