= Taman Connaught =

Township in Kuala Lumpur, Malaysia

- Township
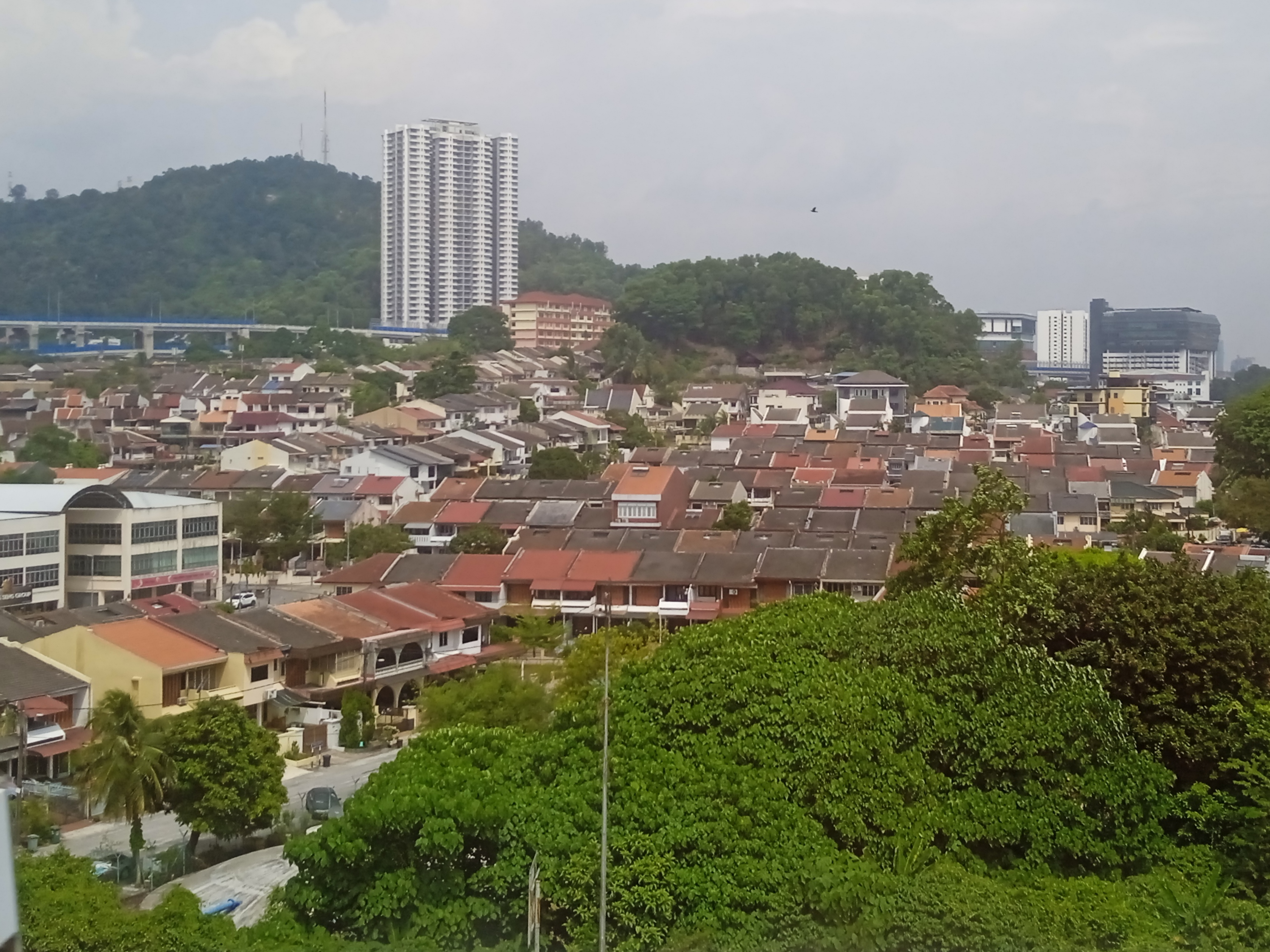
- Country: Malaysia
- State: Federal Territory of Kuala Lumpur
- Constituency: Cheras

Government
  - Local Authority: Dewan Bandaraya Kuala Lumpur
  - Mayor: Datuk Mahadi Che Ngah
- Time zone: UTC+8 (MST)
- Postcode: 56000
- Dialling code: +603

Taman Connaught is being separated by East-West Link Highway

Taman Connaught is a residential township in Cheras, in southeastern Kuala Lumpur, Malaysia.

== Location and transportation ==
It is strategically located at the junction of three major roads namely the Jalan Cheras (part of the Kuala Lumpur-Johor Bahru federal road), Kuala Lumpur Middle Ring Road 2 and Salak Expressway.

The Connaught MRT station of the Kajang line is located along the trunk road in front of Cheras Sentral, formerly known as Plaza Phoenix.

== Economy ==
=== Shopping malls ===
The Cheras Leisure Mall is situated near there, and most inhabitants of Connaught often go to Leisure Mall for shopping and meeting up with friends.

=== Connaught Night Market ===
Located along Jalan Cheras, Connaught Night Market is open only on Wednesdays every week from 5:00 pm to 1:00 am. The night market serves the needs of many of the ethnic Chinese residents here who come from all parts of Cheras, as well as UCSI University students. The night market is primarily known for the variety of Chinese food available, from stinky tofu to asam laksa. It also contributes to a massive traffic jam to the residents here, leading to some resentments among folks of Taman Connaught. Furthermore, as there is a lack of vacant parking spaces, the reckless parking behaviour on the highway adds to the risk of car accidents.

== Controversial issues ==
=== TNB's high tension powerlines near Connaught ===
The 275kv and 132kv Tenaga Nasional Berhad, TNB's high tension powerline is built near Connaught, causing many residents of Taman Connaught to protest against it.
