= Bukit Dukung MRT station =

MRT station in Kuala Lumpur, Malaysia

KG31 Bukit Dukung

General information
- Other names: Malay: بوکيت دوکوڠ (Jawi); Chinese: 武吉杜蓊; Tamil: புக்கிட் டுக்குங்
- Location: Off Cheras-Kajang Expressway, Bukit Dukung, 43200 Kajang; Selangor; Malaysia
- Coordinates: 3°12′23″N 101°34′49″E
- System: Rapid KL
- Owner: MRT Corp
- Operator: Rapid Rail
- Line: 9 Kajang Line
- Platforms: 2 side platforms
- Tracks: 2

Construction
- Structure type: Elevated
- Parking: Available with payment. 360 total parking bays; 4 motorcycle bays.
- Cycle facilities: Available
- Accessible: Yes

Other information
- Station code: KG31

History
- Opened: 17 July 2017; 9 years ago
- Former names: Taman Koperasi, Taman Koperasi Cuepacs

Services
Preceding station		Following station
Batu 11 Cheras towards Kwasa Damansara	Kajang Line	Sungai Jernih towards Kajang
Location

The Bukit Dukung station is a mass rapid transit (MRT) station serving the suburbs of Bukit Dukung, Kampung Sungai Sekamat and Sungai Balak in Kajang, Selangor, Malaysia. It is one of the stations on the MRT Kajang Line.

The station is located near the Sungai Balak interchange of the Cheras–Kajang Expressway (CKE) and the Kajang Dispersal Link Expressway (SILK), next to a Petronas petrol station.

The MRT station has a covered car park with 360 car park bays and 83 motorcycle bays.

== Station Background ==
=== Station Layout ===
The station has a layout and design similar to that of most other elevated stations on the line (except the terminal stations), with the platform level on the topmost floor, consisting of two sheltered side platforms along a double-tracked line and a single concourse housing ticketing facilities between the ground level and the platform level. All levels are linked by lifts, stairways and escalators.

L2	Platform Level	Side platform
L2	Platform Level	Platform 1:	9 Kajang Line towards KG35 Kajang (→)
L2	Platform Level	Platform 2:	9 Kajang Line towards KG04 Kwasa Damansara (←)
L2	Platform Level	Side platform
L1	Concourse	Facilities (Toilets and Surau), Faregates, Ticketing Machines, Customer Service Office, Station Control, Shops, MSPR Linkway
G	Ground Level	Entrances A and B, Feeder bus hub, Taxi and e-hailing vehicle lay-by, Jalan Cheras, Bukit Dukung

=== Exits and entrances ===
The station has two entrances. The feeder buses operate from the station's feeder bus hub at Entrance A within the MRT station area.

Kajang Line station
Entrance	Location	Destination	Picture
A	Bukit Dukung	Feeder bus hub, taxi and private vehicle lay-by, Petronas Bukit Dukung	
B	Jalan Cheras	Bus stop, taxi and private vehicle lay-by, Jalan Cheras, Sungai Sekamat, Simpang Balak	

== Bus Services ==
=== MRT Feeder Bus Services ===
With the opening of the MRT Kajang Line, feeder buses also began operating, linking the station with several housing areas and towns around the Sungai Sekamat and Sungai Long area. The feeder buses operate from the station's feeder bus hub at Entrance A of the station.

The T454 route was terminated on 16 January 2026 due to low ridership and was replaced by the Rapid KL demand-responsive transit (DRT) services (T464B).

Route No.	Origin	Destination	Via
T453	KG31 Bukit Dukung	Bandar Sungai Long	Cheras–Kajang Expressway; Jalan Sungai Long; Taman Rakan; Hab Universiti Tunku Abdul Rahman (UTAR); Bandar Sungai Long
T454 (terminated on 16 January 2026)	KG31 Bukit Dukung	Sungai Sekamat	Jalan Cheras; Jalan Sungai Sekamat
T455	KG31 Bukit Dukung	Sutera Residences	Jalan Cheras; Jalan Simpang Balak; Jalan Cheras Prima 1 Jalan Sutera 2

=== Other Bus Services ===
The MRT Bukit Dukung station is also served by some other bus services. There is also a shuttle bus service connecting the station to the Universiti Tunku Abdul Rahman (UTAR) Sungai Long campus.

Route No.	Operator	Origin	Destination	Via	Notes
450	Rapid KL	Hentian Kajang	Hub Lebuh Pudu	Reko Sentral; Bandar Kajang; KG34 Stadium Kajang; KG33 Sungai Jernih; Sungai Sekamat; Simpang Balak; KG31 Bukit Dukung; Cheras–Kajang Expressway; Batu 9 Cheras / Taman Suntex; Cheras Sentral / KG26 Taman Connaught; FT 1 Cheras Highway (Jalan Cheras); KG24 Taman Midah; AG13 KG22 Maluri; Jalan Cheras; Jalan Pasar; Jalan Pudu	The station entrance is within walking distance of the bus stop. For Kajang-bound buses, the bus stop is located across Jalan Cheras (opposite from the KL-bound bus stop)

== Gallery ==
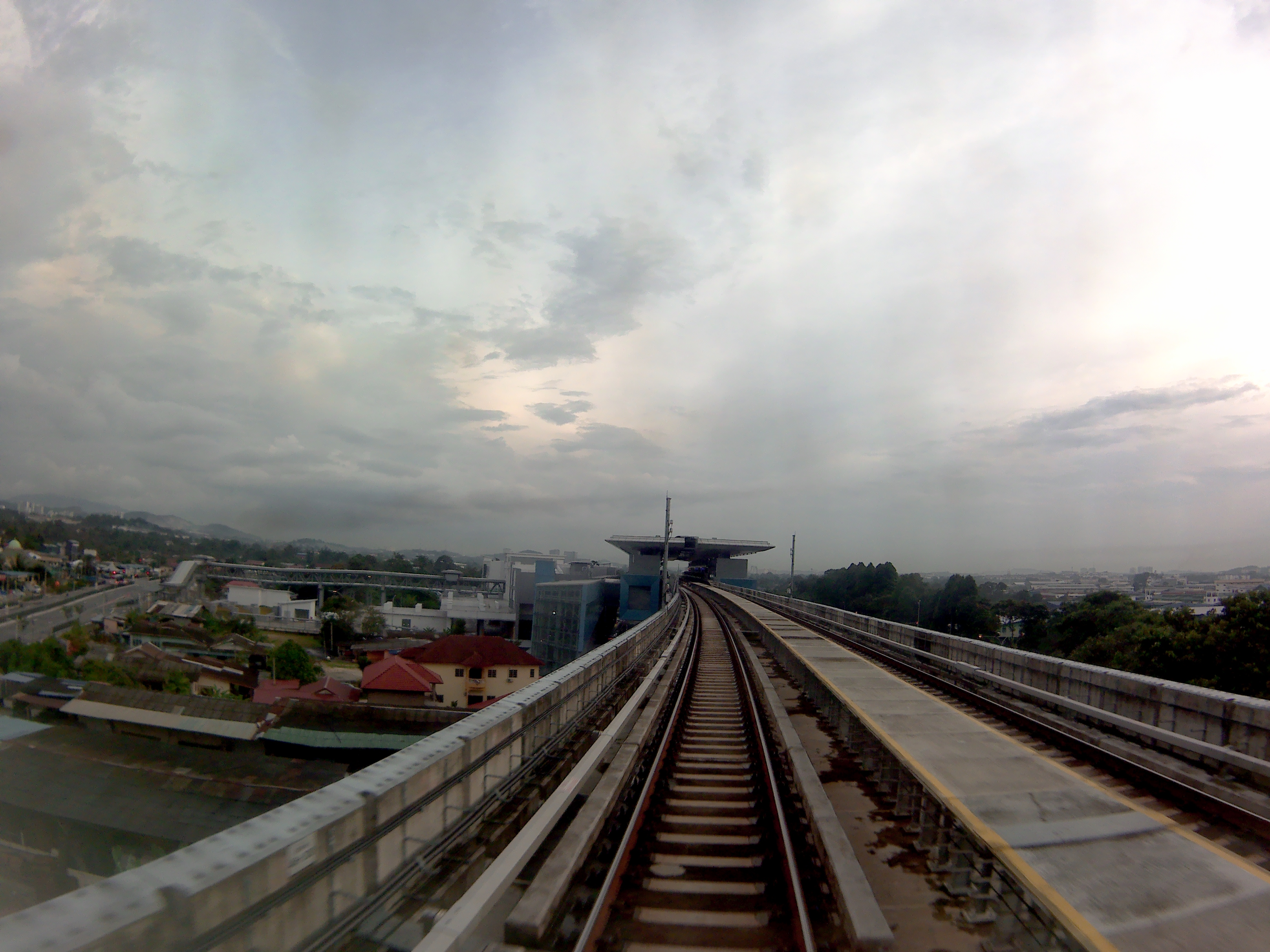
Overall view of the station.

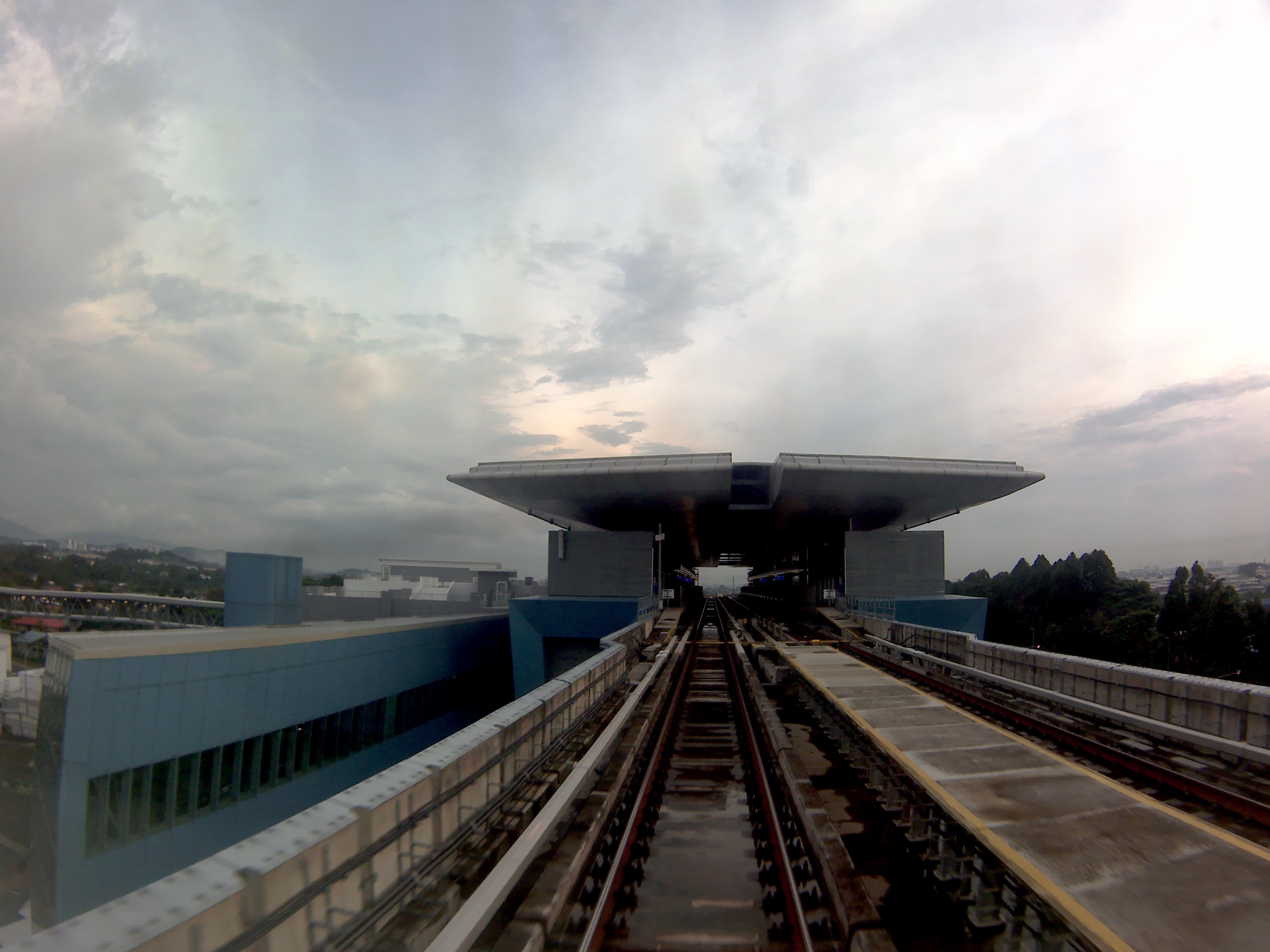
Overall view of the station.
