= Cheras Velodrome =

Cycling venue in Cheras, Kuala Lumpur, Malaysia

- Interactive map of Cheras Velodrome
- Location: Jalan Dataran Velodrome, 56000 Cheras, Kuala Lumpur

Construction
- Opened: 1986; 40 years ago
- Closed: 2017; 9 years ago

The Cheras Velodrome was a 4.8-hectare outdoor cycling velodrome with a concrete surface that existed from 1986 to 2017 and was located at 56000 Cheras in Kuala Lumpur, Malaysia.

The 333.33 metres circumference velodrome was built in 1986 and hosted the track cycling events for the 1998 Commonwealth Games from 11 to 21 September 1998. The velodrome underwent refurbishment to be ready for the Games.

The final cycling event held at the venue was the National Junior Track Championships and took place from 21 to 23 March 2017. The velodorme was set to be demolished and replaced by commercial development.

In 2021 it was still being used (pending demolition) as a training venue for the Malaysian team for the 2022 Malaysia Games.As of May 2026, there haven't any plans commenced for the velodrome, and it has been left abandoned.
