= Taman Len Seng =

Township in Kuala Lumpur, Malaysia

Coordinates: 3.0755655°N 101.743426°E

Taman Len Seng is a township in Cheras, Kuala Lumpur, Malaysia.
