= Bandar Tun Razak =

- Township
- Interactive map of Bandar Tun Razak
- Country: Malaysia
- State: Federal Territory of Kuala Lumpur
- Constituency: Bandar Tun Razak (federal constituency)

Government
  - Local Authority: Dewan Bandaraya Kuala Lumpur
  - Mayor: Datuk Mahadi Che Ngah
- Time zone: UTC+8 (MST)
- Postcode: 56000
- Dialling code: +603
- Police: Cheras
- Fire: Bandar Tun Razak

Bandar Tun Razak is a township and parliamentary constituency in Kuala Lumpur, Malaysia. It was named after the second Prime Minister of Malaysia, Tun Abdul Razak.

There are a number of schools and institutions of learning in Bandar Tun Razak. Saidina Uthman Bin Affan Mosque is a major mosque in Bandar Tun Razak. It is next to Permaisuri Lake, a lake gardens. There is a large playground for children in the lake gardens.

Among other facilities in Bandar Tun Razak are Kuala Lumpur Stadium, a velodrome, a public swimming pool, a sports centre, Hospital Universiti Kebangsaan Malaysia (HUKM), DBKL branch office and a fire station.

The town is served by the Bandar Tun Razak LRT station on the Sri Petaling line of Kuala Lumpur's light rail transit system.

== History ==
Bandar Tun Razak was once a very small town in Kuala Lumpur in the 1970s, previously known as Kampung Konggo (or Congo Village). It was named Kampung Konggo as this area was a settlement for retired Malaysian army personnel who served in the Democratic Republic of Congo in the 1960s under the United Nations. Some veterans still live in their modern houses built during the redevelopment of the area.

Kampung Konggo was renamed as Bandar Tun Razak on 1 February 1982 by Prime Minister Mahathir Mohamad in conjunction with the 10th anniversary of the Federal Territory. Bandar Tun Razak is separated from Cheras constituency in the late 1990s, making it a single parliamentary constituency. Bandar Tun Razak was a stronghold for UMNO and Barisan Nasional (BN) until the 2008 General Election which was won by PKR, Abdul Khalid bin Ibrahim, former CEO of Guthrie Berhad. Khalid was also the 14th Menteri Besar of Selangor.

== Geography ==
The constituency of Bandar Tun Razak is centred mainly at the town of Bandar Tun Razak. The constituency spans from Chan Sow Lin, modern townships such as Bandar Sri Permaisuri, Taman Segar, Alam Damai, Bandar Tasik Selatan to the lush forests next to Sungai Besi Military Camp.

There are a number of residential areas located in Bandar Tun Razak.

=== Taman Jaya ===
This town is just beside Hospital Universiti Kebangsaan Malaysia. It consists of a collection of houses, an area of shoplots, two suraus (Surau Al-Mustaqimah and Surau Al-Ittihadiah), two primary school (SK Bandar Tun Razak 1 & SK Bandar Tun Razak 2), one secondary school (SMK Bandar Tun Razak) and a fire brigade.

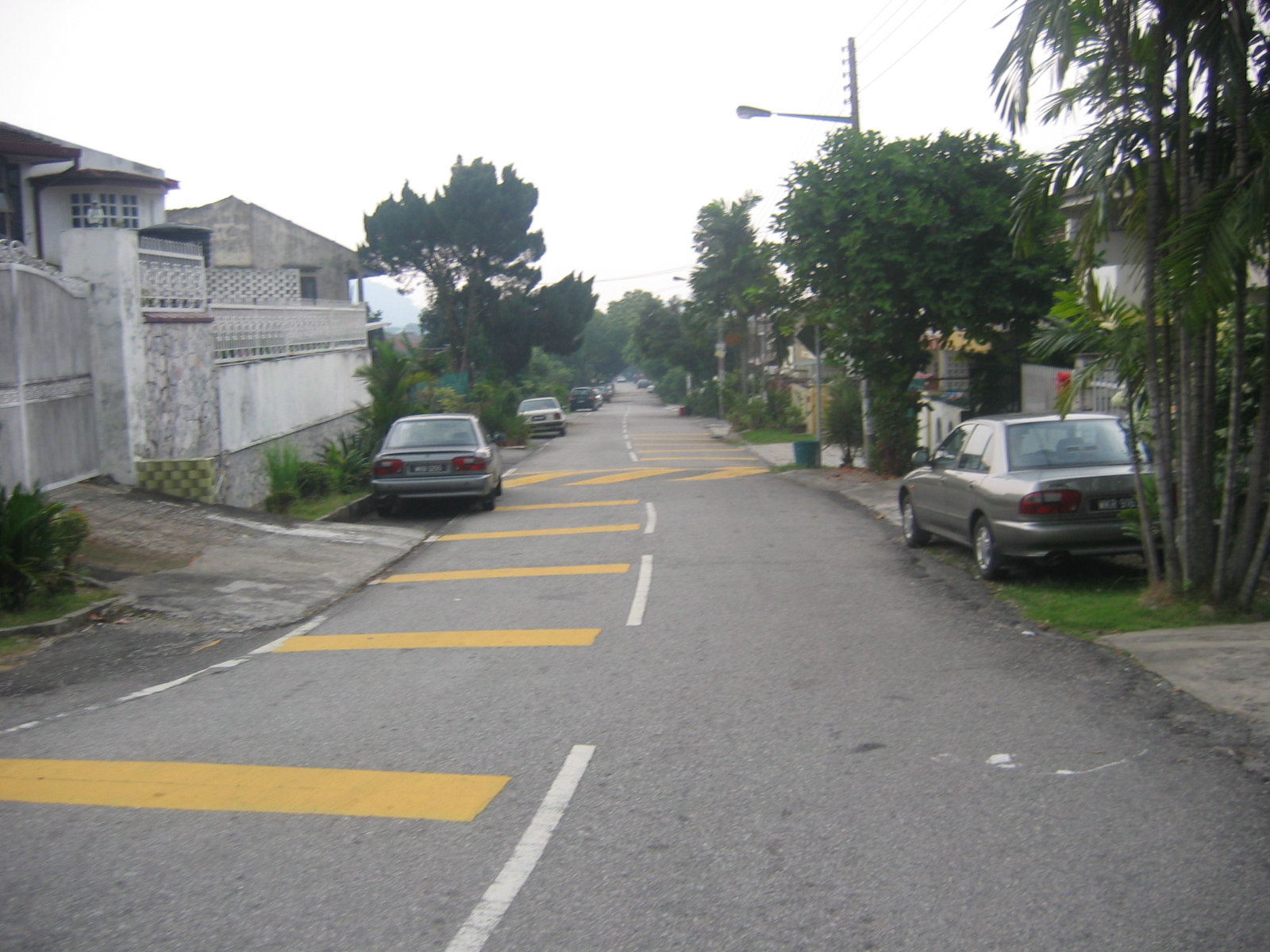
One of the roads in Taman Midah

=== Taman Midah ===
Taman Midah is a major residential area beside Taman Jaya. It is neighboured by Taman Connaught, Taman Cheras and MRR2. It consists mostly of two-storey houses and bungalows, two areas of shoplots, two primary schools and a collection of playgrounds. There is a playground used as a science experiments site for some secondary school students from SMK Bandar Tun Razak.

=== Taman Mulia ===
Taman Mulia is the primary residential area for Bandar Tun Razak. It consists of several residential areas such as Jujur, Ikhlas, Makmur and Mewah. There also a Bandar Tun Razak SP14 STAR/Sri Petaling LRT station here. There is a collection of low-cost flats such as Flat Sri Labuan, Flat Sri Kota, Flat Taman Mulia and PPR Taman Mulia.

== Member of Parliament ==
Since Bandar Tun Razak became a Constituency of Kuala Lumpur in the late 1990s, it has been represented by a member of parliament (Malay: Ahli Parlimen).

- Y.B Datuk Tan Chai Ho (1995–2008): Former Deputy Minister of Home Affairs
- Y.B Tan Sri Abdul Khalid Ibrahim (2008–2018): 14th Menteri Besar of Selangor
- Y.B Dato' Kamarudin Jaffar (2018–2022): former Tumpat MP.
- Y.B Dato' Seri Wan Azizah Wan Ismail (2022-): former Deputy Prime Minister of Malaysia

== Culture ==
Bandar Tun Razak was a township almost completely different from Bangsar.

Night activities at Bandar Tun Razak arose when several places were opened until midnight to boost its customers. Pusat Komuniti Bandar Tun Razak which is located at Taman Mulia the heart of Bandar Tun Razak serves food and has a night market.

There are other places that operate in the late night such as Bandar Sri Permaisuri, which is known for dining at night. There are a number of mamak stalls and Malindo food stalls.

== Education ==
Bandar Tun Razak is home to several schools and institutions of higher learning. The government has been investing heavily to build schools and institutions of higher learning. Here are some examples of schools in Bandar Tun Razak.

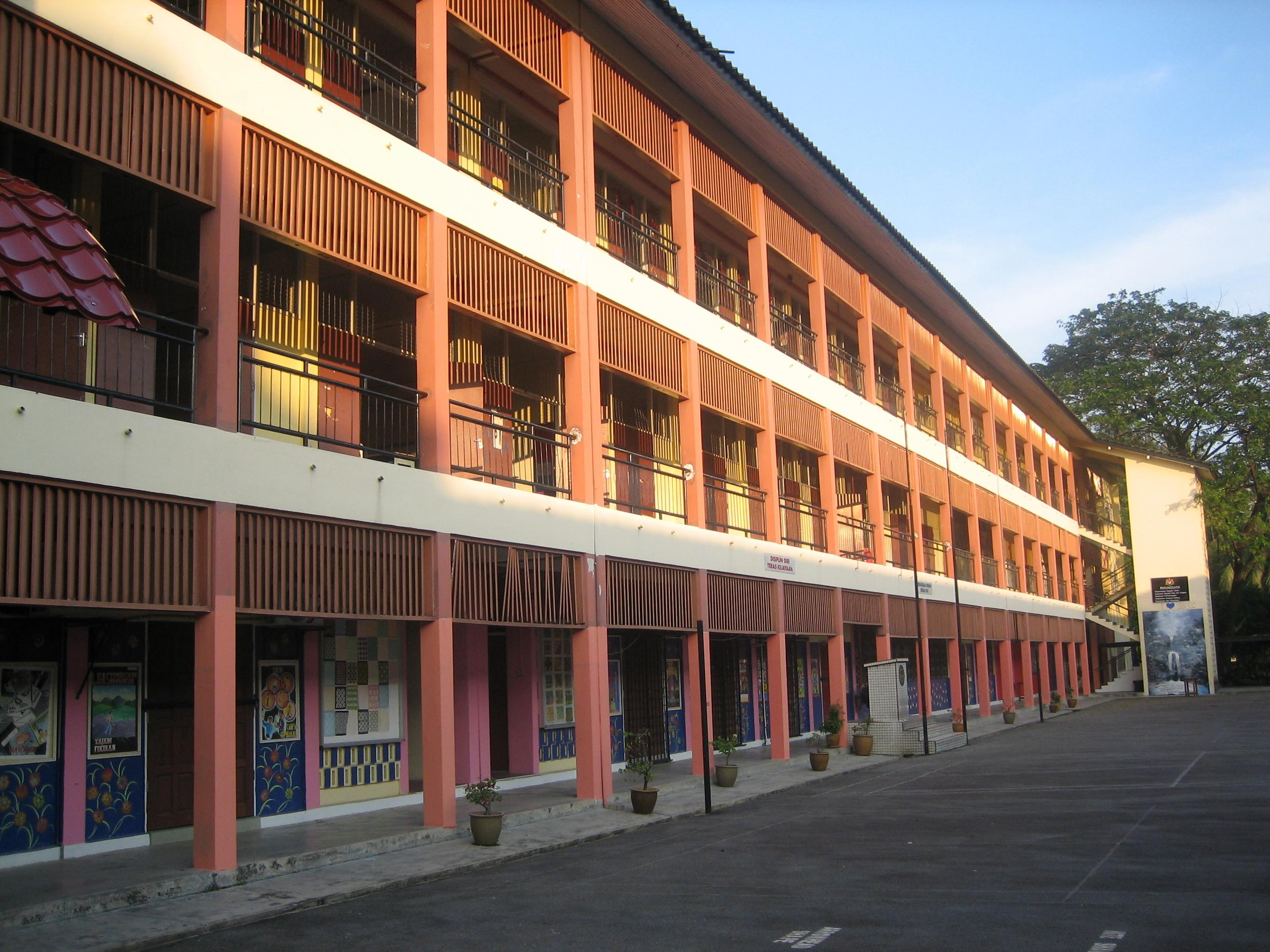
Sekolah Menengah Kebangsaan Cheras

=== SMK Cheras ===
This school has the longest history in Cheras. It was once known as SMK Kunci, SM Jalan Cheras, and later SM Cheras. The school is also known as 'cap kunci' based on the picture of a key on is logo. The principal is Pn. Sity Rohane Binti Baba DRPD:KHOO.Y.A.

=== SMK Bandar Tun Razak ===
SMK Bandar Tun Razak is located in Cheras, Kuala Lumpur. This school is near SK Bandar Tun Razak (1 and 2). The principal of the secondary school is Rosley bin Suleiman.

=== Sekolah Menengah Sains Alam Shah ===
The former Sekolah Alam Shah occupied the site for 41 years before it moved to Putrajaya in June 2003. A new school was formed on the old site and it is called SM Sains Alam Shah, better known as ASiS (Alam Shah Science School).

=== SM Teknik Kuala Lumpur ===
Sekolah Menengah Teknik Kuala Lumpur, better known as Technical Institute Kuala Lumpur (TIKL), is at Jalan Yaacob Latif. It is a boarding school that offers courses such as Electrical Engineering, Mechanical Engineering, Civil Engineering and Commerce. It was the best technical school in Malaysia in 2006. Nowadays, this school was declared as one of the Ministry of Education's Cluster School in 2008.

=== SK Taman Midah (1) ===
SK Taman Midah (1) was built in May 1987. There were only 29 students because there was a lack of teaching facilities. In 1988, the school had 600 students and 28 teachers. The parents and teachers association was later formed on 6 March 1988.

=== Other schools and institutes ===
- Sekolah Menengah Agama Majlis Agama Islam Wilayah Persekutuan (SMA – MAIWP)
- Sekolah Menengah Integrasi Sains Tahfiz (SMISTA – MAIWP)
- SMK Seri Mulia
- SM Sains Selangor.
- SMK Seri Permaisuri.
- SMK Seri Tasik.
- SK Seri Tasik.
- SK Taman Midah 1
- SK Taman Midah 2
- SK Bandar Tun Razak 1
- SK Seri Permaisuri* (2010)

There are two institutes used for teachers' training:

- Institut Perguruan Ilmu Khas (Special Education Teachers' Institute)
- Institut Perguruan Teknik (Technical Teachers' Institute)

== Healthcare ==
There are two hospitals in Bandar Tun Razak:

- Hospital University Kebangsaan Malaysia (HUKM)
- Hospital Rehabilitasi Cheras (HRC)

There are numerous other clinics throughout Taman Midah, Taman Mulia and Flat Sri Kota, including Klinik Kesihatan Cheras, a large medical and dental clinic run by the Ministry of Health, Malaysia.

== Gardens ==
Permaisuri Lake Gardens is one of three major parks and lake gardens in Kuala Lumpur. It was formerly a tin mine that, as part of an urban regeneration strategy, was turned into an area for leisure, recreation and sports as the focus for the development of Bandar Tun Razak. The park and lake gardens were designed by an international consultant design team led by the urbanist and architect Peter Verity (PDRc) as the first major professionally designed landscape park in Malaysia (see UIA International Architect 6/4). It is maintained by Dewan Bandaraya Kuala Lumpur (DBKL). Residents from Cheras, Bandar Tun Razak and Kuala Lumpur use the gardens for jogging, picnicking and other recreational purposes. There are yoga classes conducted in the gardens in the morning while the park is filled with children and joggers in the evening.

== Facilities ==
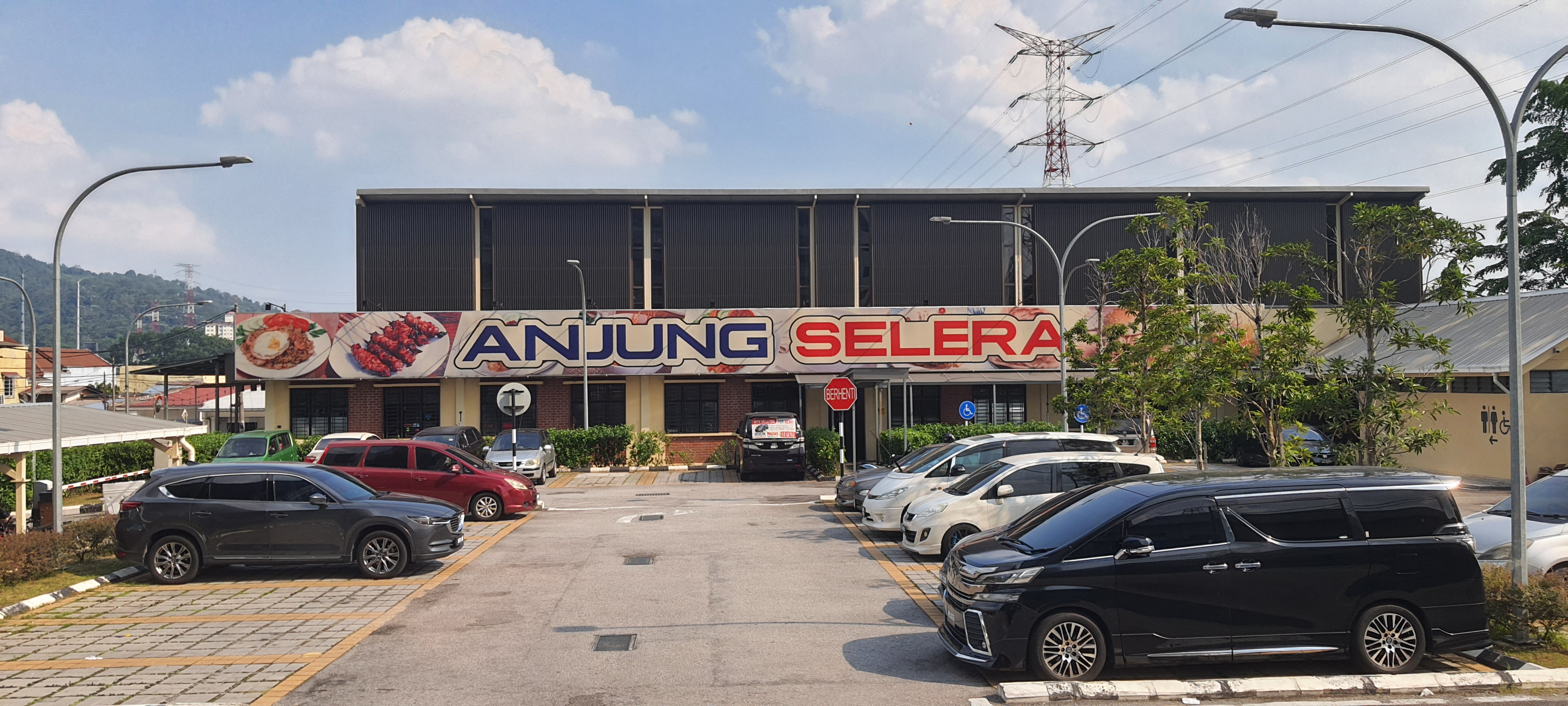
A newly-renovated public food court in Bandar Tun Razak, Kuala Lumpur. Photo taken in May 2025.

There are several facilities in Bandar Tun Razak.

One of them is the huge Stadium Bolasepak Kuala Lumpur (Kuala Lumpur Football Stadium). The stadium received a major overhaul from Cheras's Football Stadium in 2004. It is used for football matches, events and some art performances.

The DBKL district office is in Bandar Tun Razak's town centre. There are some shoplots in the capital, such as 7-Eleven, Food Courts, BHP petrol station, post office, CIMB Bank, a maternity clinic and a mini supermarket. 7-Eleven outlets are also in Bandar Sri Permaisuri and Taman Midah.

The Malaysian Road Transport Department (Malay language: Jabatan Pengangkutan Jalan Malaysia/JPJ) office is in Bandar Sri Permaisuri. Taman Midah was once the location of a Tesco Extra hypermarket, it has since been taken over by Lotus's. A 24-hour restaurant (KFC Football Stadium), some clinics, photo shops and numerous restaurants are in Bandar Tun Razak.

The town is served by the Bandar Tun Razak LRT station on the Sri Petaling line of Kuala Lumpur's light rail transit system. Opened in 1998, it was part of the line's Phase 2 when the line branched out to Sri Petaling from Chan Sow Lin.

== See also ==
- Kuala Lumpur
- Cheras, Kuala Lumpur
- Sri Petaling Line
- East–West Link Expressway
- Cheras–Kajang Expressway
- Sungai Besi Expressway

3°5′N 101°43′E
