= Cheras, Kuala Lumpur =

Coordinates: 3.107178°N 101.71649°E

Cheras
- Suburb and Mukim
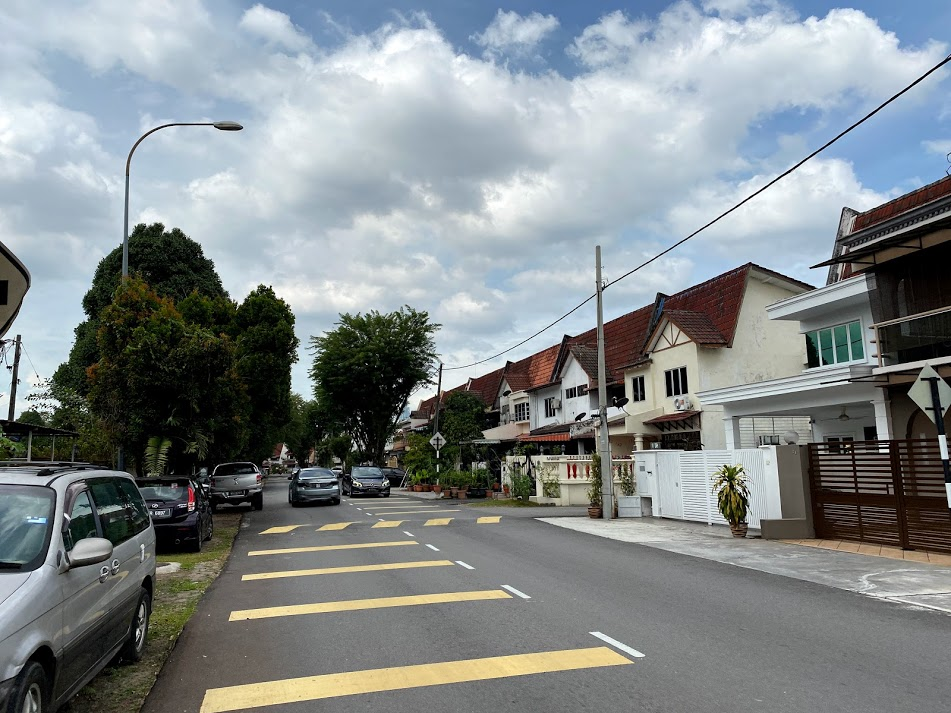
- Residential area of Taman Cheras Indah in Cheras
- Interactive map of Cheras
- Country: Malaysia
- State: Selangor and Federal Territory of Kuala Lumpur
- Constituency: Cheras, Pandan, Bangi, Hulu Langat

Government
  - Local Authority: Kuala Lumpur City Hall (West), Kajang Municipal Council (South), Ampang Jaya Municipal Council (North)
- Time zone: UTC+8 (MST)
- Postcode: 560xx, 431xx, 432xx, 68xxx
- Dialling code: +603-9
- Police: Cheras (KL), Kajang and Ampang Jaya (Selangor)
- Website: www.dbkl.gov.my www.mpkj.gov.my www.mpaj.gov.my www.selangor.gov.my/hululangat.php

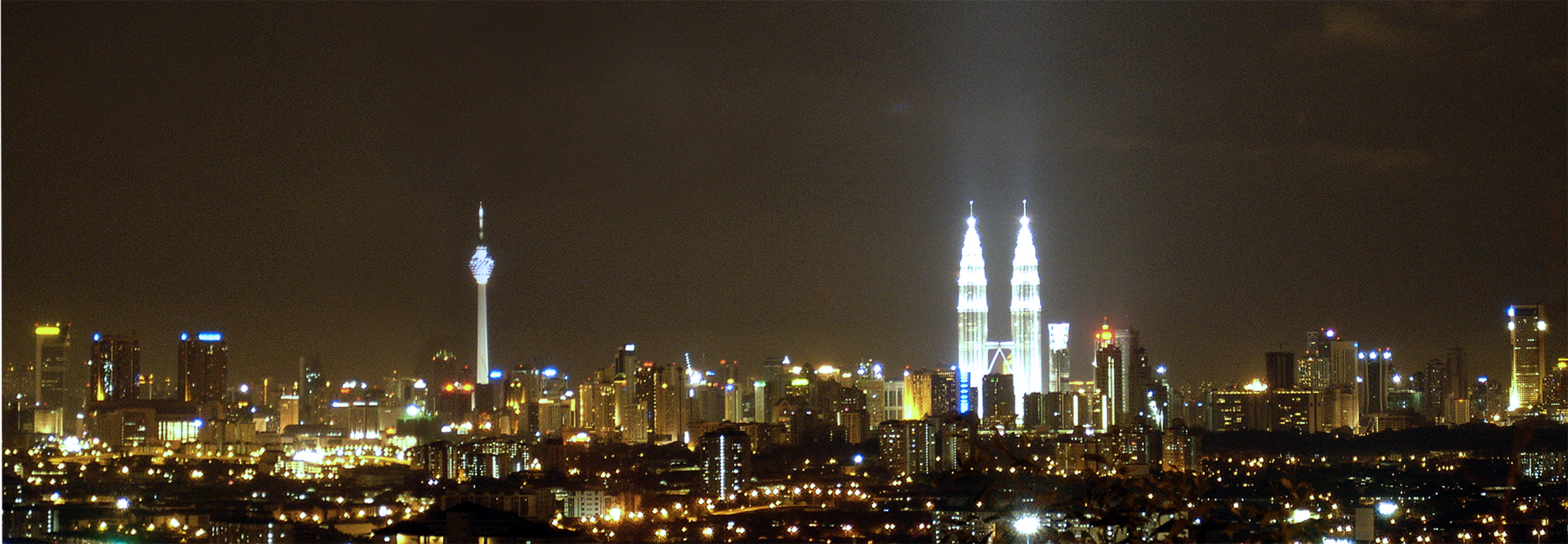
The skyline of Kuala Lumpur at night from Cheras. Photo taken on the hills bordering nearby Ampang.

Cheras is a suburb and a district, straddling both the Federal Territory of Kuala Lumpur and Hulu Langat District in the state of Selangor, Malaysia.

The township is located to the south-east of downtown Kuala Lumpur. Cheras is also adjacent to Ampang to the north and Kajang to the south, both of which are major towns that administer some townships in Cheras such as Taman Segar Perdana, Taman Bukit Segar, Cheras Hartamas and Kampung Cheras Baru. These townships are either administered in whole or part by both MPKJ and MPAJ due to its close proximity.

The district mainly consist of Chinese residents, which also make up the majority of voters for the Cheras electorate.

== Education ==
- Beaconhouse Newlands International School
- Cempaka National School
- Oxburgh International School (Oxburgh Academy)
- Sri Sempurna International School
- Sunway College Velocity
- MARA Poly-Tech University (UPTM) Kuala Lumpur
- UCSI International School Kuala Lumpur
- UCSI University
- YPC International College

== Transportation ==
Cheras is served by a number of stations on the MRT Kajang Line which includes the stations of AEON–Maluri, Taman Pertama, Taman Midah, Taman Mutiara, Taman Connaught, Taman Suntex, Sri Raya, Bandar Tun Hussein Onn and Batu 11 Cheras. Cheras is also served by two stations on the KTM Seremban Line which are Salak Selatan and Bandar Tasik Selatan.

The district is also served by AEON–Maluri LRT station and Cheras LRT station on the Ampang and Sri Petaling lines respectively.

== Politics ==
The current Member of Parliament (MP) for the Cheras parliamentary constituency is Tan Kok Wai from Pakatan Harapan, who won the seat in the 2022 Malaysian general election. He has all along been the Member of Parliament for Cheras since 1995 when the constituency was first established. While the western part of Cheras in Kuala Lumpur is served by the Cheras constituency, the northern and southern parts of Cheras in Selangor are served by different constituencies. The northern part of Cheras is served by the Pandan constituency which also serves the Pandan Indah township in neighbouring Ampang Jaya. For the southwest part of Cheras such as Balakong, Batu 11 Cheras, Cheras Perdana, Cheras Jaya, Bandar Mahkota Cheras and Bandar Tun Hussein Onn, it is served by Bangi constituency. As for the southeast part of Cheras such as Cheras Zen, Batu 9 Cheras, Batu 10 Cheras, Taman Suntex, Taman Cuepacs, Sungai Raya and Taman Kota Cheras, it is served by the Hulu Langat constituency.

== Sport ==
The Cheras Velodrome existed from 1986 to 2017 and hosted the track cycling events for the 1998 Commonwealth Games from 11 to 21 September 1998.
