= Klang Valley Integrated Transit System =

Rail transportation network in the Klang Valley

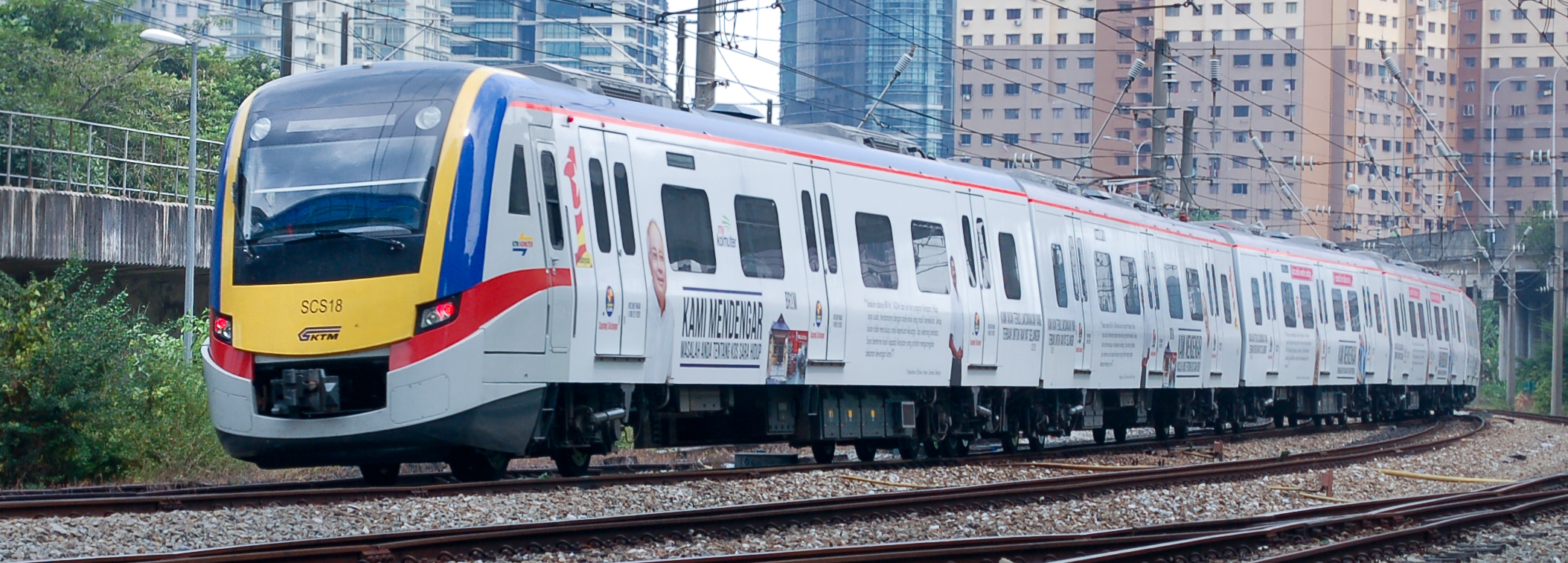
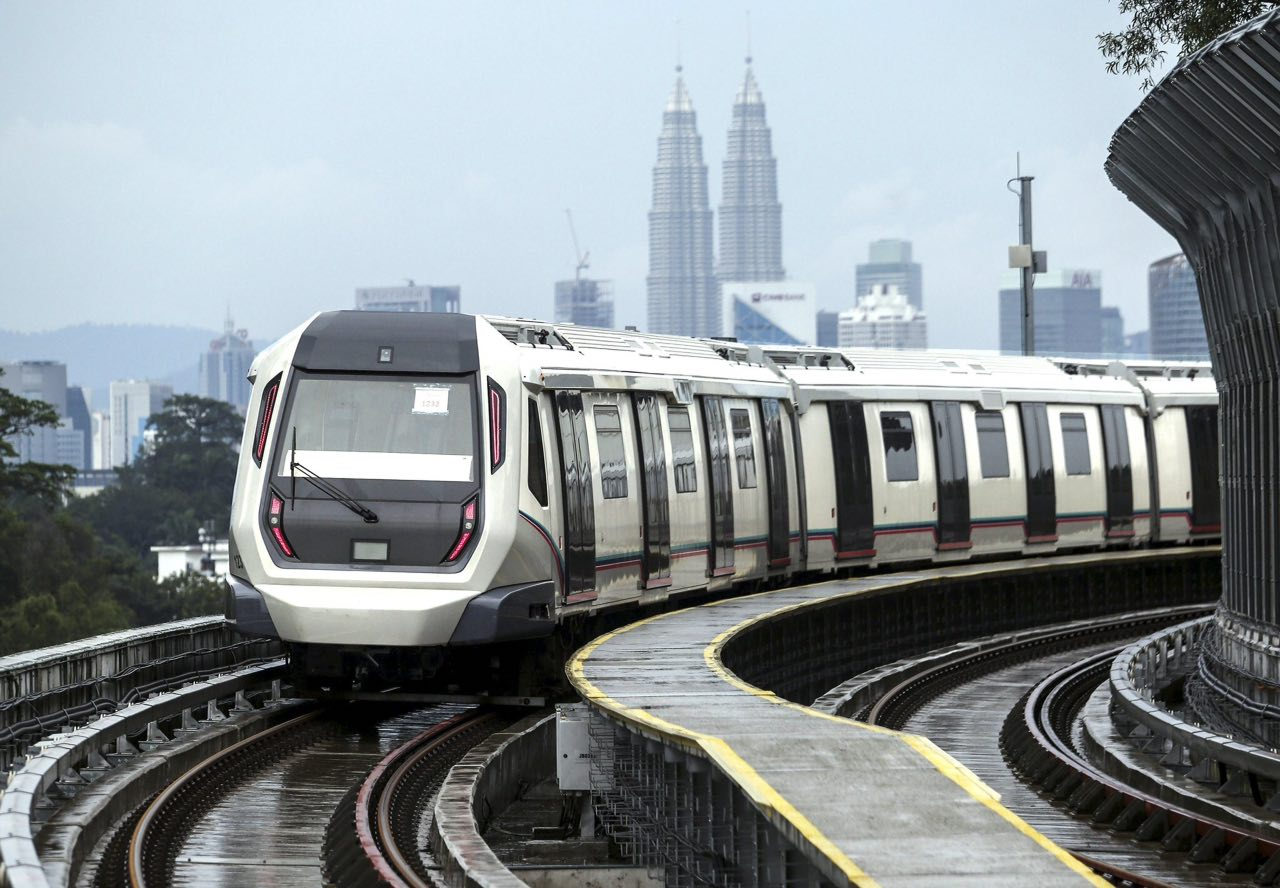
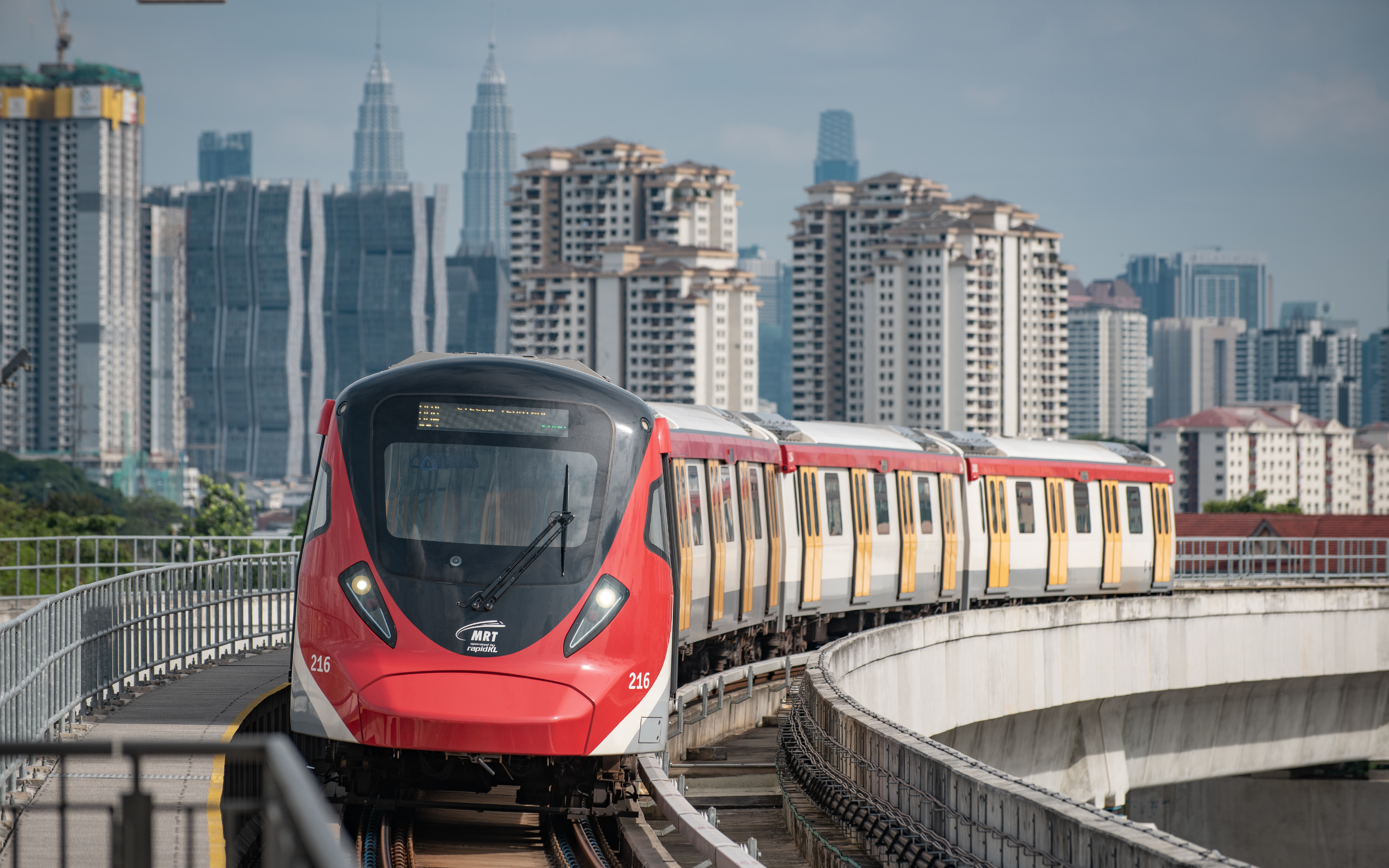
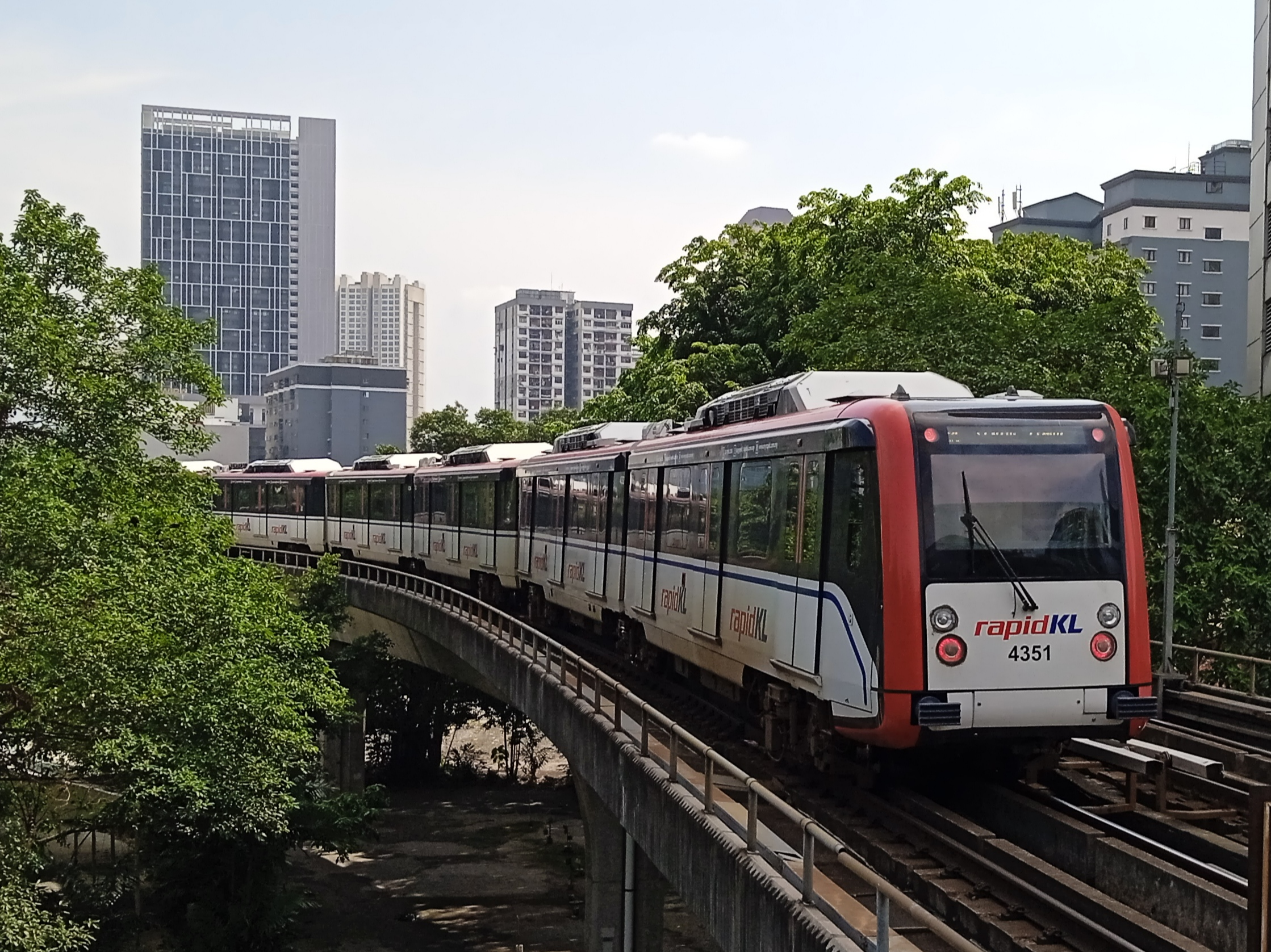
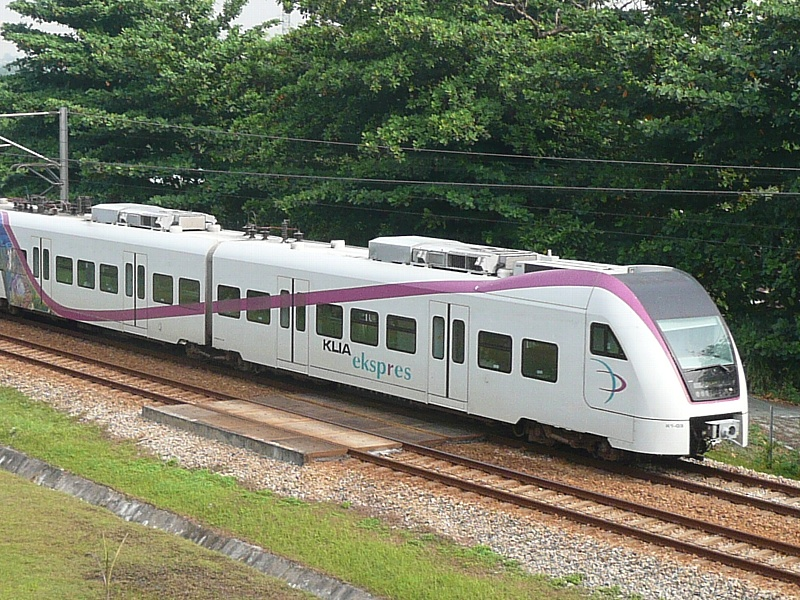
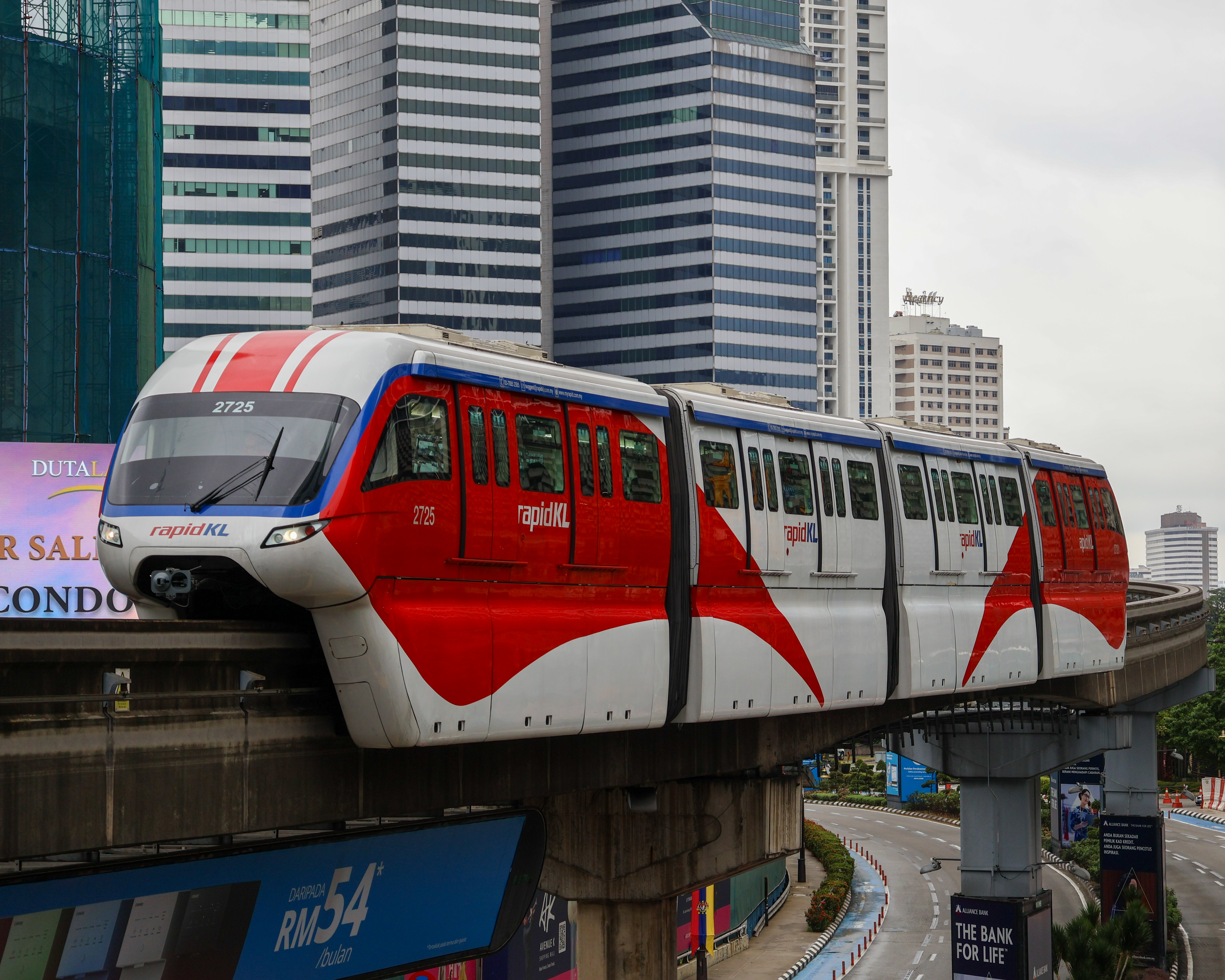
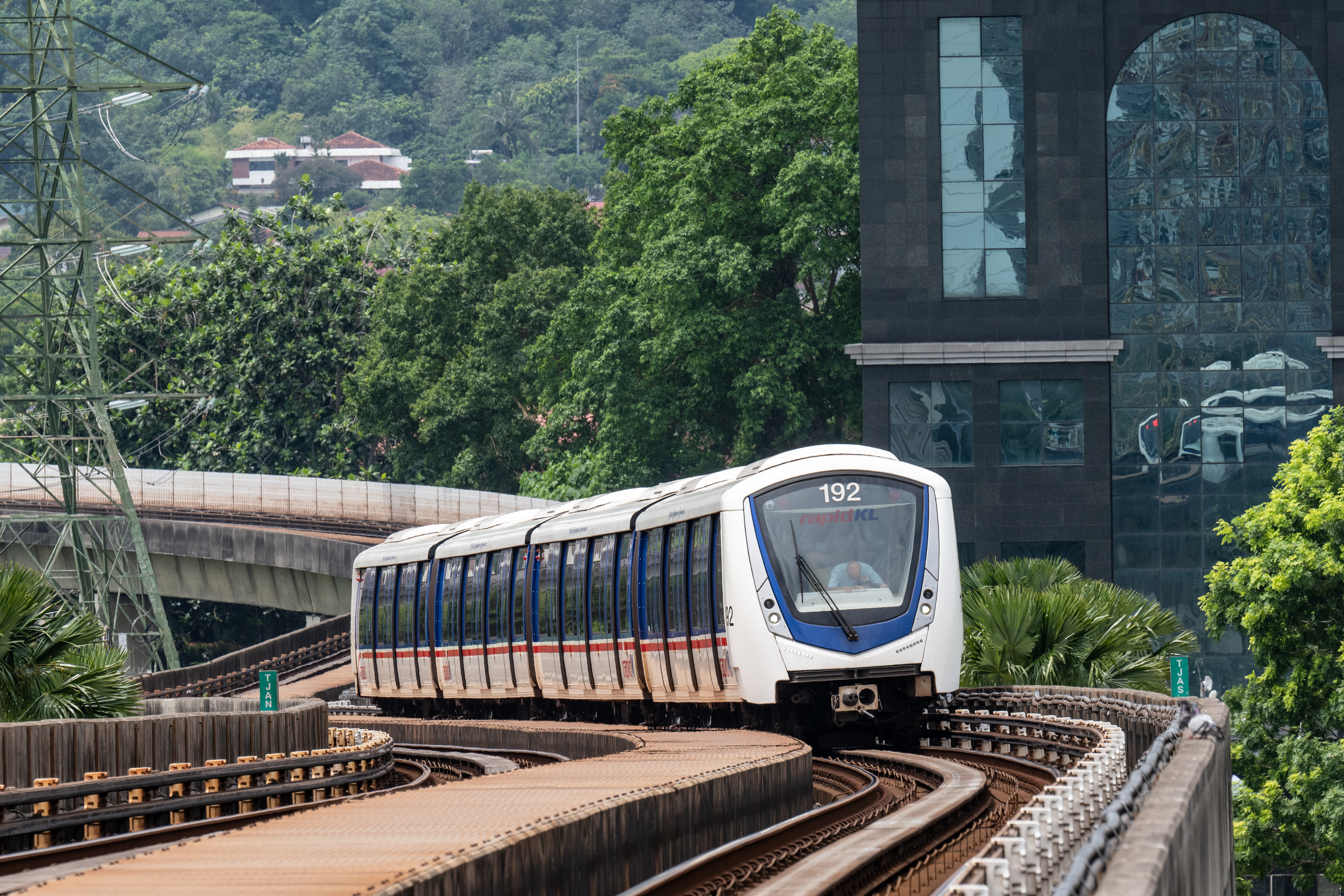
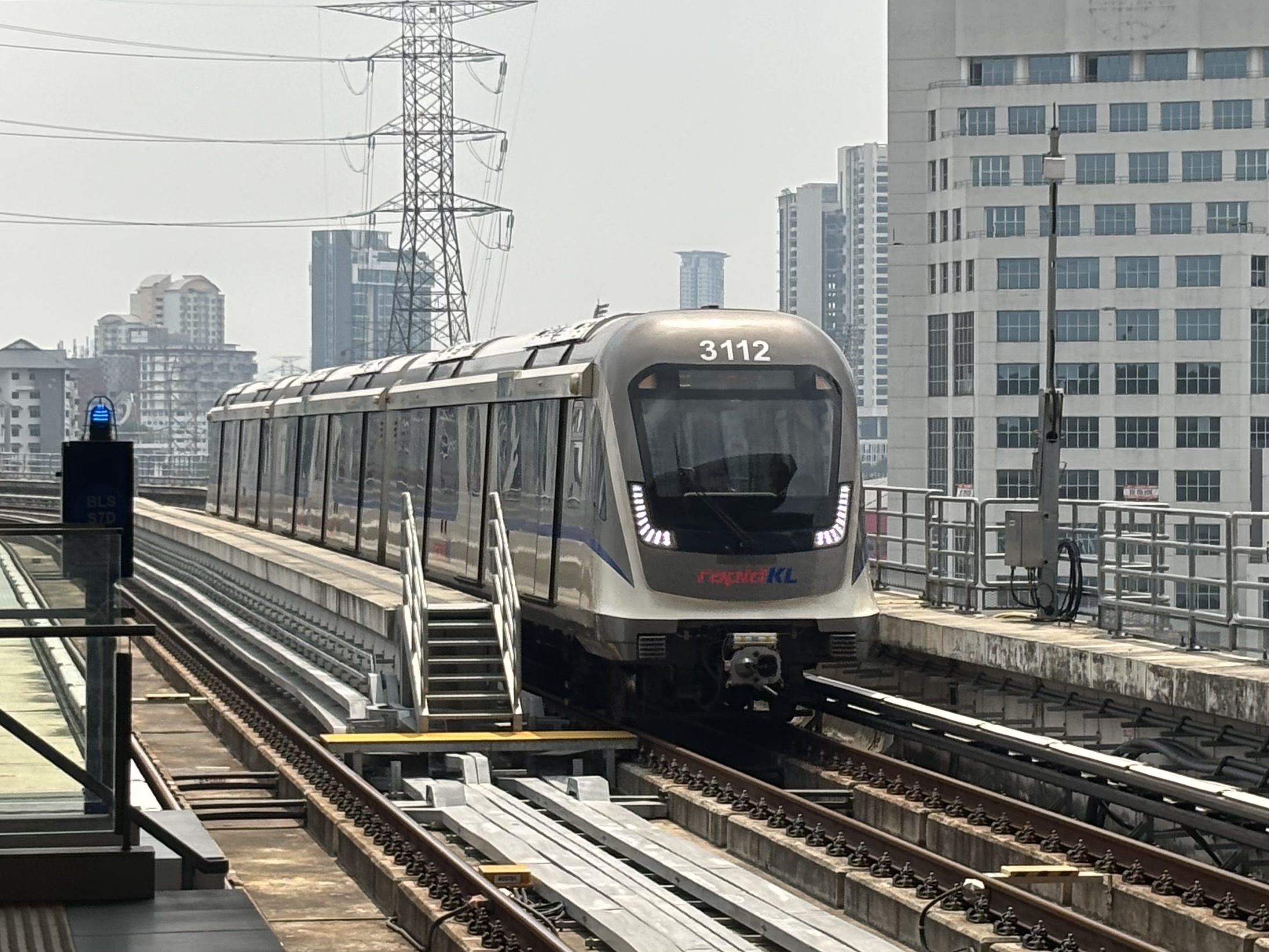

Overview
- Native name: Sistem Transit Bersepadu Lembah Klang (Malay)
- Locale: Klang Valley and Greater Kuala Lumpur
- Transit type: Commuter rail, rapid transit & bus rapid transit
- Number of lines: 13 (12 operational & 1 suspended)
- Number of stations: 216 transit stations
- Daily ridership: 1,031,537 (2025) (only Rapid KL)
- Annual ridership: 356,397,644 (2025) (Note: Total ridership includes Rapid Rail, KTM Komuter (Klang Valley sector) and BRT Sunway Line.)
- Website: https://myrapid.com.my/

Operation
- Began operation: 14 August 1995; 31 years ago
- Operators: Rapid Rail (Rapid KL LRT, MRT & Monorail lines); Rapid Bus (Rapid KL BRT); Express Rail Link; Keretapi Tanah Melayu (KTM Komuter)

Technical
- System length: 593.3 km (369 mi)
- Track gauge: 1,000 mm (3 ft 3 3/8 in): 1 2 10; 1,435 mm (4 ft 8 1/2 in): 3 4 5 6 7 9 11 12; Straddle beam monorail: 8; Fully elevated single carriageway: B1
- Electrification: 25 kV 50 Hz AC overhead line: 1 2 6 7 10; 750 V DC third rail: 3 4 5 8 9 11 12

The Klang Valley Integrated Transit System is an integrated transport network that primarily serves the Klang Valley region and Greater Kuala Lumpur in Malaysia. The system commenced operations in August 1995 with the introduction of commuter rail service on the existing rail between Kuala Lumpur and Rawang. The system have since expanded and currently consists of 12 fully operating rail lines in a radial formation; two commuter rail lines, 7 rapid transit lines, 1 bus rapid transit line, 2 airport rail links to the Kuala Lumpur International Airport's (KLIA) Terminal 1 and Terminal 2, and one temporarily suspended airport rail link to the Sultan Abdul Aziz Shah Airport. The system encompasses 593.3 kilometres (368.7 mi) of grade-separated railway with 216 operational stations.

== History ==
Rail transit in Kuala Lumpur and Selangor began in 1886 when a railway line from Kuala Lumpur to Bukit Kuda (just outside Klang) was opened. The line remains operational to this day as the Tanjung Malim-Port Klang Line.

Klang Valley Integrated Transit System Timeline

The first rail transit system to provide local rail services in Kuala Lumpur and the surrounding Klang Valley suburban areas was introduced on 14 August 1995, as the KTM Komuter. A year later in December 1996, STAR LRT entered into service, followed by the PUTRA LRT which opened in stages beginning September 1998.

STAR LRT, a light rapid transit (LRT) system, was first conceived in the 1981 Transport Master Plan, when the Malaysian government proposed a network of LRT lines connecting Kuala Lumpur city centre with the surrounding areas. An agreement was signed between the government and STAR in 1992 and construction began in 1993. A second LRT system, the PUTRA LRT, was conceived and began construction in 1994. Both systems would eventually begin operations in 1996 and 1998 respectively.

The initial plan was for STAR and PUTRA to build, own and manage the LRTs. However, both companies ran into financial difficulties and were heavily in debt by 2001, which led to the government taking over both LRTs via Syarikat Prasarana Negara Bhd, now known as Prasarana Malaysia. The LRT lines were subsequently renamed to LRT Ampang and Sri Petaling Lines, and LRT Kelana Jaya Line respectively.

In April 2002, Express Rail Link, which began construction in May 1997, entered into service, with two lines that connect KL Sentral to the newly built Kuala Lumpur International Airport (KLIA) (now KLIA Terminal 1). The lines were extended to KLIA's Terminal 2 (then known as klia2) in 2014.

In 2003, the KL Monorail opened for service. However, the operator and owner of the line, KL Monorail System Sdn Bhd, quickly ran into financial difficulties and the service was again taken over by Prasarana Malaysia in 2007.

In 2015, the BRT Sunway Line entered into service, serving the densely populated Sunway area.

In 2016, the Sri Petaling Line was extended to Putra Heights with 11 new stations. The Kelana Jaya Line was similarly extended to Putra Heights with 17 new stations. The extension of both lines serves the Puchong Jaya and Subang Jaya areas.

In 2010, proposals for a mass rapid transit (MRT) system similar to the Singapore's MRT network was put forth. This resulted in the launching of the Klang Valley Mass Rapid Transit (KVMRT) project. The first line to be constructed, the MRT Kajang Line, opened on 16 December 2016. A second MRT line, the MRT Putrajaya Line official opened on 16 June 2022. Phase 2 of the line was subsequently launched on 16 March 2023. Unlike the LRT lines, the MRT lines are owned by MRT Corp, but are integrated with the LRT and Monorail lines and are all operated under a single rapid transit system called Rapid KL.

In 2026, the LRT Shah Alam Line was launched, becoming the third LRT system and fourth LRT line in the Klang Valley.

A third MRT line and the final part of the KVMRT project, the MRT Circle Line, is currently in its planning stage and is projected to be completed by 2032.

== Integration ==
Initially, different competing companies operated the various transit systems and had developed these rail and bus systems separately and at various times. As a result, many of these systems did not integrate well with the others, making transferring from system to system inconvenient for passengers. Aggravated by Kuala Lumpur's poor pedestrian network, moving from one rail system to another often required a lot of walking, stair-climbing, and escalator-use.

Since 28 November 2011, the paid areas of shared stations operated by Rapid Rail under the Rapid KL system for the Kelana Jaya Line, Ampang Line, and Sri Petaling Line, as well as the KL Monorail from 1 March 2012, have been integrated physically under a common ticketing system, effectively making those stations interchange stations. This enables commuters to transfer between lines at the interchange stations without buying a new ticket each time, provided that they do not exit the paid area. This became possible at the Titiwangsa, Hang Tuah, Putra Heights, and Masjid Jamek stations. With the opening of the latest rapid transit lines on 17 July 2017 and 16 June 2022, the Kajang Line and Putrajaya Line respectively, the integrated system has been expanded to Pasar Seni, Merdeka-Plaza Rakyat, Maluri, Tun Razak Exchange, Chan Sow Lin, Kwasa Damansara and Sungai Besi stations, and to USJ 7 station with the launching of the BRT Sunway Line.

The Shah Alam Line is currently the only rapid transit line of Rapid KL that is not integrated with the rest of the system, despite having interchanges at Glenmarie (with the Kelana Jaya Line) and Bandar Utama (with the Kajang Line). The line currently uses a newer integrated fare system, which will replace and be expanded to the rest of the Rapid KL system in the future.

The KTM Komuter lines and Express Rail Link (ERL) lines implement their own ticketing systems and only allow integration between their respective rail lines.

== Fares ==
The Touch 'n Go stored value fare card is accepted as a mode of payment on the Rapid Bus system, LRT, MRT, BRT, and monorail lines, as well as the KTM Komuter and ERL lines, easing the hassle of buying separate tickets for travelling on different networks. However, the fare integration for the Rapid KL system does not include KTM Komuter and Express Rail Link.

Rapid Rail, the operator of the LRT, MRT and monorail lines, and Rapid Bus (which covers about 70% of the Klang Valley's bus network as well as the BRT Sunway Line), provide various daily and monthly passes for commuters.

Since February 2024, KTM Kommuter services started accepting credit and debit card as payment method, including NFC based mobile payment services such as Apple Pay, Google Pay and Samsung Pay. Rapid KL services are slated to follow suit with the implementation of open payment system starting March 2024 and concluding by March 2025. As of October 2026 this has still not been implemented with the current plans being to have 30% of RapidKL rail stations with open payment support by October 2027, buses to have support by January 2028, and the entire network to have support by April 2029.

== System network ==

Railway lines around Klang Valley

The KTM Komuter, a commuter rail service, provides local rail services in Kuala Lumpur and the surrounding Klang Valley suburban areas. The light rapid transit (LRT) lines and monorail line were introduced later on to serve the urban Kuala Lumpur area and its satellite towns and cities. (i.e. Ampang, Petaling Jaya, Subang Jaya, Puchong, Gombak, Shah Alam, Klang) The mass rapid transit (MRT) lines aim to connect the outskirts of the Klang Valley (i.e. Damansara, Sungai Buloh, Putrajaya, Kajang) with the city centre. Malaysia's first bus rapid transit (BRT) line was introduced to ease pedestrian traffic in Bandar Sunway, a thriving leisure and entertainment township in Subang Jaya. 3 airport rail links connect the city centre with the 2 major airports of the Klang Valley, two to the Kuala Lumpur International Airport's (KLIA) Terminals 1 and 2, and one to the Sultan Abdul Aziz Shah Airport.

| Line Number | Line Name | Began Operation | Last Extension | Terminus | | Stations | Length (km) | System | Depots | Operator |
|---|---|---|---|---|---|---|---|---|---|---|
| 1 | Batu Caves–Pulau Sebang Line | 14 August 1995; 31 years ago | 13 March 2025 (Note: Kajang 2 infill station) | Batu Caves | Pulau Sebang/Tampin | 27 | 135.6 | Commuter rail (S-train) | • Sentul • Seremban | KTM |
| 2 | Tanjung Malim–Port Klang Line | 14 August 1995; 31 years ago | 11 May 2026 (Note: Segambut Utara infill station) | Tanjung Malim | Port Klang | 34 | 127.5 | Commuter rail (S-train) | • Sentul • Seremban | KTM |
| 3 | Ampang Line | 16 December 1996; 29 years ago | 6 December 1998 (Note: STAR LRT Phase 2 (Sultan Ismail-Sentul Timur)) | Sentul Timur | Ampang | 18 | 15 | Light metro | • Ampang • Kuala Sungai Baru | Rapid Rail |
| 4 | Sri Petaling Line | 16 December 1996; 29 years ago | 1 December 2016 (Note: Sri Petaling Line LEP (Sri Petaling-Putra Heights)) | Sentul Timur | Putra Heights | 29 | 37.6 | Light metro | • Ampang • Kuala Sungai Baru | Rapid Rail |
| 5 | Kelana Jaya Line | 1 September 1998; 28 years ago | 30 June 2016 (Note: Kelana Jaya Line LEP (Kelana Jaya-Putra Heights)) | Gombak | Putra Heights | 37 | 46.4 | Light metro | • Subang | Rapid Rail |
| 6 | KLIA Ekspres | 14 April 2002; 24 years ago | 1 May 2014 (Note: Extension to KLIA T2) | KL Sentral | KLIA T2 | 3 | 59.1 | Express Airport rail link | • Salak Tinggi | ERL |
| 7 | KLIA Transit | 14 April 2002; 24 years ago | 1 May 2014 | KL Sentral | KLIA T2 | 6 | 59.1 | Airport rail link | • Salak Tinggi | ERL |
| 8 | KL Monorail | 31 August 2003; 23 years ago | —N/a | KL Sentral | Titiwangsa | 11 | 8.6 | Monorail | • Brickfields | Rapid Rail |
| 9 | Kajang Line | 16 December 2016; 9 years ago | 17 July 2017 (Note: Kajang Line Phase 2 (Semantan-Kajang)) | Kwasa Damansara | Kajang | 29 | 46 | Rapid transit | • Sungai Buloh • Kajang | Rapid Rail |
| 10 | KL Sentral–Terminal Skypark Line (temporarily suspended) | 1 May 2018; 8 years ago (Note: Uses the same KTM tracks for KL Sentral-Subang Jaya section) | - | KL Sentral | Terminal Skypark | 3 | 24.5 | Airport rail link (Limited express) | • Sentul | KTM |
| 11 | Shah Alam Line | 29 June 2026; 4 months ago | —N/a | Bandar Utama | Johan Setia | 20 | 37.8 | Light metro | • Johan Setia | Rapid Rail |
| 12 | Putrajaya Line | 16 June 2022; 4 years ago | 16 March 2023 (Note: Putrajaya Line Phase 2 (Kampung Batu-Putrajaya Sentral)) | Kwasa Damansara | Putrajaya Sentral | 36 | 57.7 | Rapid transit | • Sungai Buloh • Serdang | Rapid Rail |
| B1 | BRT Sunway Line | 2 June 2015; 11 years ago | —N/a | Sunway-Setia Jaya | USJ 7 | 7 | 5.6 | Bus rapid transit | • Sunway | Rapid Bus |
| Total | | | | | | 216 (Note: Counting interchange stations (paid area integration) and connecting stations (non-paid area integration) within same station building only once.) | 593.3 (Note: The Ampang Line and Sri Petaling Line share the route/tracks between Chan Sow Lin and Sentul Timur; combined length of both lines is 45.1km. The combined length of KTM lines is 287km.) | | | |

== Proposed and future lines ==
Klang Valley Integrated Transit System Map that include proposed and current lines

=== Future lines ===
The construction of the third MRT line, the Circle Line is expected to commence in 2027.

| Line Number | Line Name | Stations | Length | Status | Planned opening | Terminus | System | Depots | Operator |
|---|---|---|---|---|---|---|---|---|---|
| 13 | Circle Line | 30 | 51.6 km | Undergoing land acquisition | 2032 | Circle route | Rapid transit | • Kampung Puah • Taman Midah | Rapid Rail |

=== Proposed / shelved lines ===
| Line Number | Line Name | Stations | Length | Status | Terminus | |
|---|---|---|---|---|---|---|
| 14 | Putrajaya Monorail | 25 | TBA | Shelved since 2004 | Putrajaya Sentral | Kajang & Cyberjaya |
| B2 | BRT Federal Line | 24 | 32.52 km | Shelved on 28 November 2017 | Pasar Seni | Klang |

== Ridership ==
| | | Annual Ridership | | | | | |
| Line Number | Line Name | 2021 | 2022 | 2023 | 2024 | 2025 | 2026 (Note: Ridership data updated till October 2026.) |
|---|---|---|---|---|---|---|---|
| 1 | Batu Caves–Pulau Sebang Line (Note: Ridership data for Line 1 and 2 are consolidated as KTM Komuter Klang Valley in the APAD report.) | 4,583,229 | 11,161,821 | 13,502,856 | 12,484,751 | 10,230,638 | 7,080,651 |
| 2 | Tanjung Malim–Port Klang Line | 4,583,229 | 11,161,821 | 13,502,856 | 12,484,751 | 10,230,638 | 7,080,651 |
| 3 | Ampang Line (Note: Ridership data for Line 3 and 4 are consolidated as LRT Ampang in the APAD report.) | 21,938,973 | 44,151,332 | 50,590,579 | 64,022,915 | 71,019,400 | 60,921,301 |
| 4 | Sri Petaling Line | 21,938,973 | 44,151,332 | 50,590,579 | 64,022,915 | 71,019,400 | 60,921,301 |
| 5 | Kelana Jaya Line | 25,123,614 | 55,015,765 | 73,763,592 | 84,733,297 | 89,632,502 | 74,621,494 |
| 6 | KLIA Ekspres (Note: Ridership for KLIA Ekspres is usually available by quarterly basis, published by both MOT Quarterly Rail Report or APAD Report.) | 53,434 | 564,585 | 1,442,393 | 1,888,520 | 2,103,920 | 1,838,282 |
| 7 | KLIA Transit (Note: Ridership for KLIA Transit is usually available by quarterly basis, published by both MOT Quarterly Rail Report or APAD Report.) | 724,997 | 3,384,996 | 5,143,217 | 6,085,514 | 7,190,783 | 6,297,398 |
| 8 | KL Monorail | 4,226,329 | 10,668,069 | 18,107,573 | 20,032,392 | 21,101,210 | 17,299,728 |
| 9 | Kajang Line | 19,573,010 | 45,348,209 | 66,501,508 | 84,520,994 | 92,737,532 | 80,055,935 |
| 10 | KL Sentral–Terminal Skypark Line (temporarily suspended) | 946 | 27,951 | 4,174 (Note: KL Sentral–Terminal Skypark Line service is currently suspended as of 15 February 2023) | - | - | - |
| 11 | Shah Alam Line | - | - | - | - | - | 5,198,024 |
| 12 | Putrajaya Line | - | 4,147,577 | 29,555,851 | 48,126,110 | 55,670,064 | 49,501,921 |
| B1 | BRT Sunway Line | 1,293,943 | 3,615,899 | 5,087,926 | 5,835,458 | 6,711,597 | 6,493,290 |
| Total | | 77,518,475 | 178,086,204 | 263,699,669 | 327,729,951 | 356,397,646 | 305,950,681 |

== Rolling stock ==
| Line Code | Line Name | Formation | In service On order | Rolling Stock | Manufacturers | Image |
|---|---|---|---|---|---|---|
| 1 | Batu Caves–Pulau Sebang Line | 6 carriage EMU | 37 trainsets (222 car) | KTM Class 92 | (China) CRRC Zhuzhou | |
| 2 | Tanjung Malim–Port Klang Line | 6 carriage EMU | 37 trainsets (222 car) | KTM Class 92 | (China) CRRC Zhuzhou | |
| 3 | Ampang Line | 6 carriage high-floor LRV | 50 trainsets (300 car) | CRRC Zhuzhou LRV "AMY" | (China) CRRC Zhuzhou | |
| 4 | Sri Petaling Line | 6 carriage high-floor LRV | 50 trainsets (300 car) | CRRC Zhuzhou LRV "AMY" | (China) CRRC Zhuzhou | |
| 5 | Kelana Jaya Line | 2 carriage Linear induction EMU | 35 trainsets (70 car) | Bombardier Innovia ART 200 | (Canada) Bombardier | |
| 5 | Kelana Jaya Line | 4 carriage Linear induction EMU | 35 trainsets (140 car) | Bombardier Innovia ART 200 | (Canada) Bombardier | |
| 5 | Kelana Jaya Line | 4 carriage Linear induction EMU | 14 trainsets (56 car); 27 trainsets (108 car) | Bombardier Innovia Metro 300 | *Consortium (Canada) Bombardier / (Malaysia) Hartasuma | |
| 6 | KLIA Ekspres | 4 carriage EMU | 8 trainsets (32 car) | Siemens Desiro ET 425 M | (Germany) Siemens Mobility | |
| 6 | KLIA Ekspres | 4 carriage EMU | 2 trainsets (8 car) | CRRC Changchun "Equator EMU" | (China) CRRC Changchun | |
| 7 | KLIA Transit | 4 carriage EMU | 4 trainsets (16 car) | Siemens Desiro ET 425 M | (Germany) Siemens Mobility | |
| 7 | KLIA Transit | 4 carriage EMU | 4 trainsets (16 car) | CRRC Changchun "Equator EMU" | (China) CRRC Changchun | |
| 8 | KL Monorail | 4 carriage monorail EMU | 9 trainsets (36 car) | Scomi SUTRA | (Malaysia) Scomi Rail | |
| 9 | Kajang Line | 4 carriage EMU | 58 trainsets (232 car) | Siemens Inspiro "The Guiding Light" | *Consortium (Germany) Siemens / (China) CRRC Nanjing Puzhen / (Malaysia) SMH Rail | |
| 10 | KL Sentral–Terminal Skypark Line | 3 carriage EMU | 4 trainsets (12 car) | KTM Class 83 | (South Korea) Hyundai Precision / (Japan) Marubeni | |
| 11 | Shah Alam Line | 3 carriage LRV | 22 trainsets (66 car) | CRRC Zhuzhou LRV "Pingu" | *Consortium; CRRC Zhuzhou / Siemens Ltd China / (Malaysia) Tegap Dinamik | |
| 12 | Putrajaya Line | 4 carriage EMU | 49 trainsets (196 car) | Hyundai Rotem EMU "Ducky" | *Consortium (South Korea) Hyundai Rotem / (Malaysia) Apex Communications / (South Korea) POSCO Engineering | |
| B1 | BRT Sunway Line | Single-deck bus | 15 battery run-electric bus | Foton AUV C12 BJ6129EVCA | (China) Foton Motor | |
