= Kajang Depot =

Kajang Depot Depoh Kajang
Location
- Location: Jalan Bukit Dukung-Kajang, Kajang, Selangor

Characteristics
- Owner: MRT Corp
- Operator: Rapid Rail (RapidKL)
- Roads: FT 1 Kuala Lumpur-Johor Bahru trunk road Cheras–Kajang Expressway Grand Saga Expressway
- Rolling stock: Siemens Inspiro
- Routes served: 9 MRT Kajang Line

History
- Opened: 2016

Kajang Depot (Malay: Depoh Kajang) is a railway yard serving the MRT Kajang Line in Kajang, Selangor, Malaysia.

== Background and functions ==
The depot was built at the site of a former Radio Television Malaysia (RTM) transmitter station.

The depot houses a central maintenance facility with overhaul functions for trains on the MRT Kajang Line only.

This is one of two yards serving the Kajang Line, the other being the Sungai Buloh yard, which is also shared with the MRT Putrajaya Line. Kajang Depot is also one of six yards in the Rapid Rail network.
