= Sungai Buloh Depot =

Sungai Buloh Depot Depoh Sungai Buloh
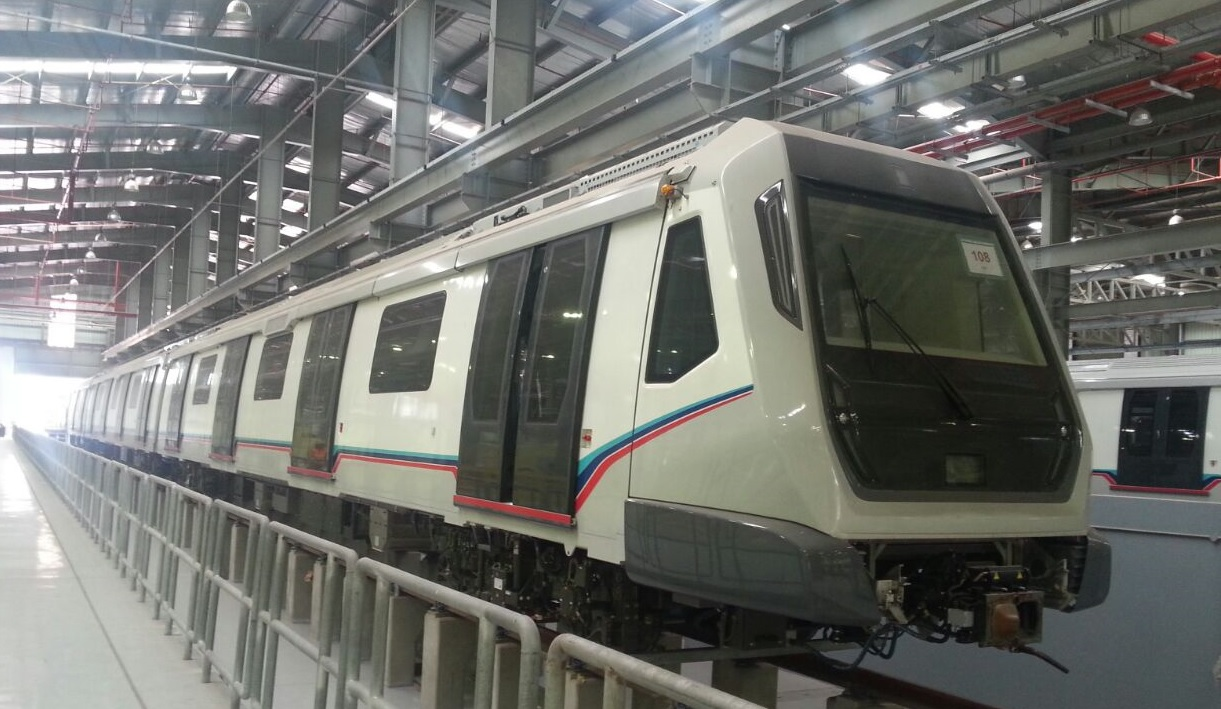
- Siemens Inspiro at Sungai Buloh Depot
- Interactive map of Sungai Buloh Depot; Depoh Sungai Buloh

Location
- Location: Jalan Subang-Sungai Buloh, Sungai Buloh, Selangor
- Coordinates: 3.18399°N 101.56815°E

Characteristics
- Owner: MRT Corp
- Operator: Rapid Rail
- Type: At Grade
- Roads: Federal Route 15 Subang Airport Highway
- Rolling stock: 9 Siemens Inspiro; 12 Hyundai Rotem
- Routes served: 9 Kajang Line; 12 Putrajaya Line

History
- Opened: 2015

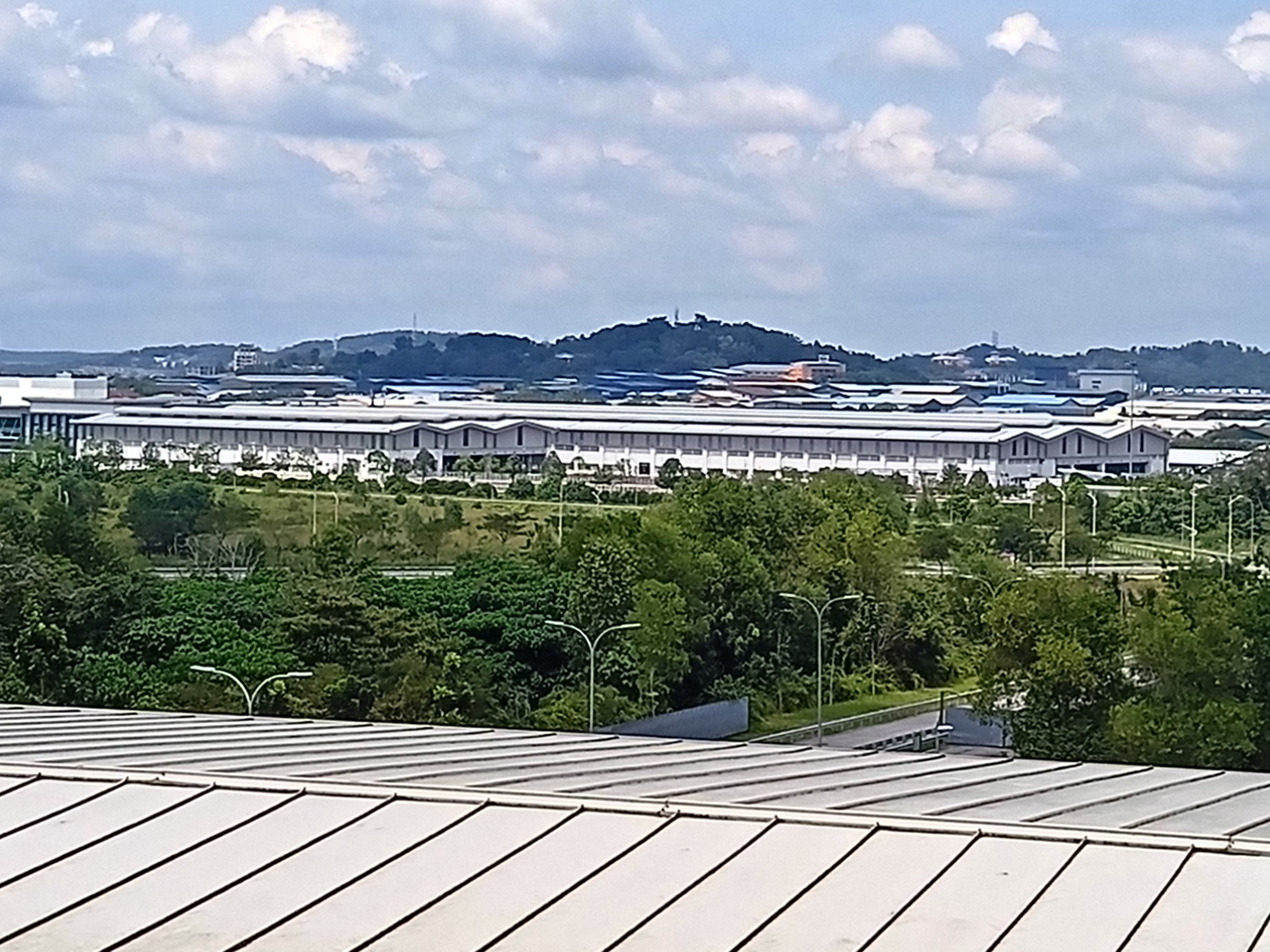
Sungai Buloh Depot

The MRT Sungai Buloh Depot (Malay: Depoh MRT Sungai Buloh) is a railway yard and bus garage in U4,Sungai Buloh, Selangor, Malaysia, it is the largest train depot in South East Asia and also the largest service Mass Rapid Transit (MRT) depot in Malaysia serving the MRT Kajang Line and the Putrajaya Line. It is located behind Kwasa Damansara MRT station. The MRT Sungai Buloh Bus depot (Malay: Depoh Bas MRT Sungai Buloh) in also located here on the North East side of the train depot. It is the major Rapid Bus hub in Klang Valley.

== Train Depot Features ==
The Sungai Buloh Train Depot has a loading bay for trains to be loaded or taken away of overhauling, it also has train automatic wash located on the top side of the depot.

== Bus Depot ==
The Sungai Buloh Bus Depot is one of the first and main MRT Feeder Bus depot of the MRT Kajang Line Feeder Bus routes in Klang Valley, the other being Kajang Bus Depot together with MRT Kajang Depot.

The depot was built at the site of the Rubber Research Institute of Malaysia(RRIM) estate, near the development project of Kwasa Damansara.

The depot houses a central maintenance facility with overhauling functions for trains of both the Kajang Line and the Putrajaya Line.

It is one of two yards for the Kajang Line, the other being the Kajang Depot, as well as being one of Rapid Rail's six yards in its network, the others being Kajang, Ampang, Kuala Sungai Baru, Subang and Brickfields.
