= Rapid KL =

Public transportation system in Malaysia

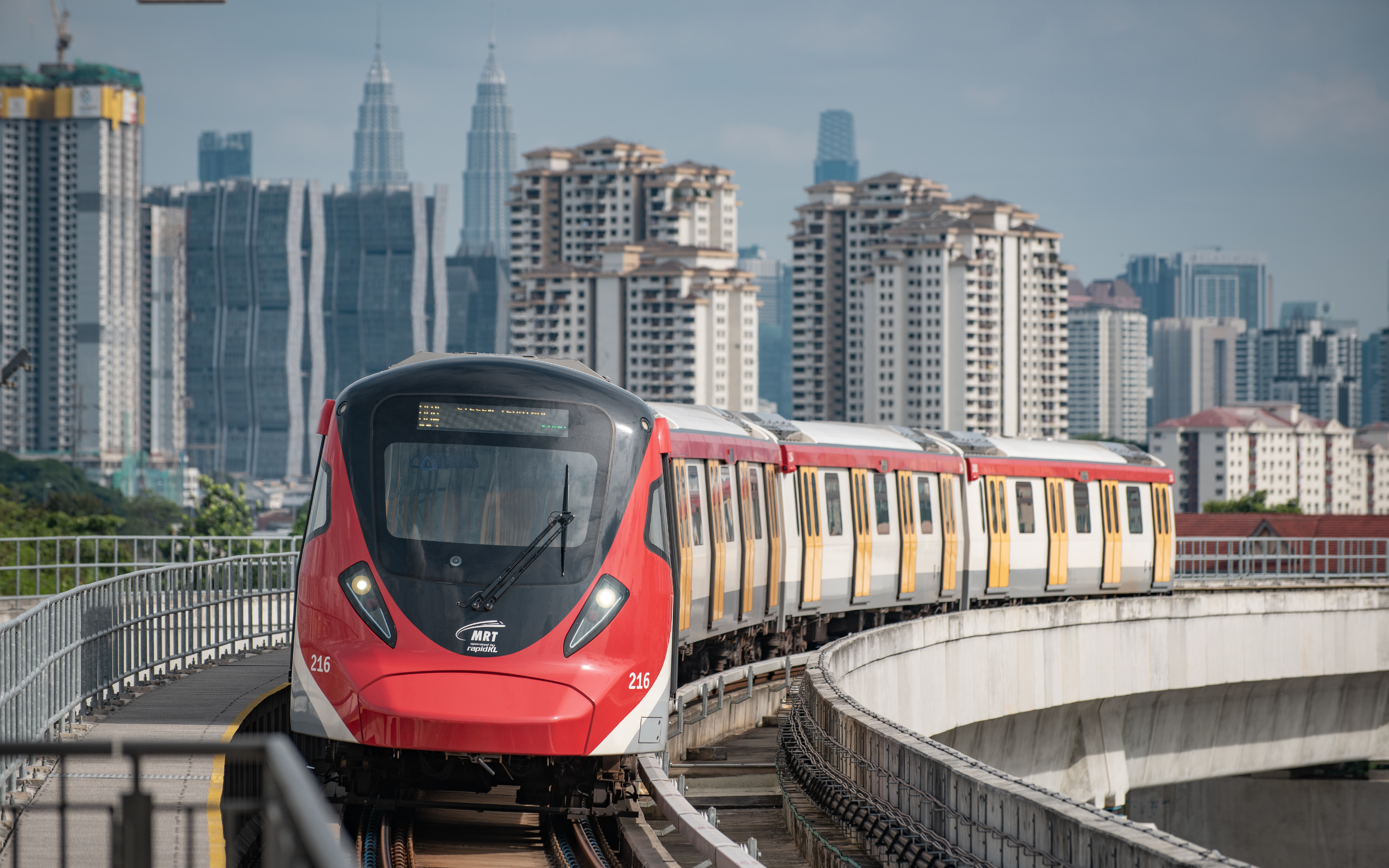
- Hyundai Rotem EMU Set 216 entering Kampung Batu Station.

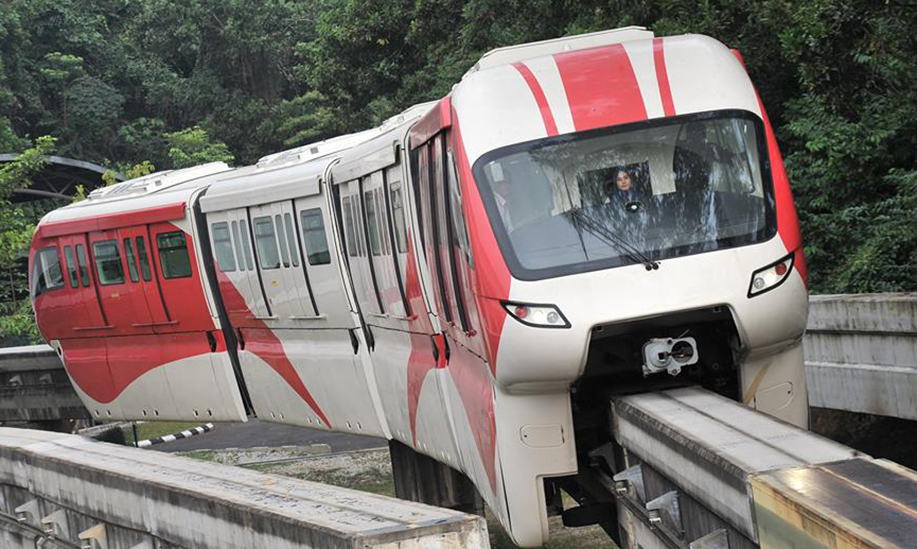
- Scomi SUTRA used by KL Monorail

Overview
- Native name: Rangkaian Pengangkutan Integrasi Deras Kuala Lumpur
- Owner: Prasarana Malaysia
- Locale: Klang Valley, Malaysia
- Transit type: Rail: Light Rapid Transit (LRT) - narrow profile; Mass Rapid Transit (MRT) - wide profile; Monorail; Bus: Bus Rapid Transit (BRT); Stage Bus & Feeder Bus
- Number of lines: Rapid Rail and BRT: 8 (operational); 1 (under land acquisition phase)
- Line number: Rapid Rail and BRT: 3 4 5 8 9 11 12 13 B1
- Number of stations: 162 (Rapid Rail and BRT)
- Daily ridership: 1,003,512 (Q3 2025); 1,541,050 (2025; Highest)
- Annual ridership: 408,150,947 (2025)
- Website: myrapid.com.my

Operation
- Began operation: 1996; 30 years ago (as rapid transit); 2004; 22 years ago (as brand name)
- Operators: Rapid Rail Sdn Bhd; Rapid Bus Sdn Bhd

Technical
- System length: 247.2 km (Rapid Rail and BRT)
- Track gauge: 1,435 mm (4 ft 8 1/2 in); 3 4 5 9 11 12 13; Straddle beam monorail; 8; Fully elevated single carriageway; B1
- Electrification: 750 V DC third rail

Rapid KL (stylized as rapidKL) is a public transportation system owned by Prasarana Malaysia and operated by its subsidiaries Rapid Rail and Rapid Bus. The acronym stands for Rangkaian Pengangkutan Integrasi Deras Kuala Lumpur, which translates to Kuala Lumpur Integrated Rapid Transit Network in the Malay language. Rapid KL, with its 204.1 km (126.8 mi) of metro railway and 5.6 km (3.5 mi) of BRT carriageway, is part of the Klang Valley Integrated Transit System, operating throughout Kuala Lumpur and Selangor's satellite cities in the Klang Valley area.

The first rail transit line was opened in 1996. It was followed by a federal government restructuring of public transport systems in Kuala Lumpur in the early 2000s after the bankruptcy of STAR and PUTRA light rapid transit (LRT) operators, the precursors to the Ampang and Sri Petaling Lines and Kelana Jaya Line respectively, and the creation of the Rapid KL brand. In 2003, it had inherited bus services and assets formerly operated and owned by Intrakota and Cityliner after being bailed out. Four years later, the Malaysian Government bailed out KL Infrastructure Group, the owner and operation concession holder of the KL Monorail, and placed it under the ownership of Prasarana Malaysia. Since then, the Rapid KL system has expanded to include two mass rapid transit (MRT) lines, an additional LRT line and a bus rapid transit (BRT) line.

== History ==
=== Planning and constructing ===
After the adoption of the Federal Territory (Planning) Act of 1982, the Kuala Lumpur City Hall was obliged to prepare a structure plan for the areas under its jurisdiction. In line with this, the 1981 Master Plan Transportation Study Report specifically recommended the implementation of a light rapid transit (LRT) system with exclusive rights-of-way and a capacity of 20,000 passengers per hour per direction. The proposed network has 4 corridors from the city centre to the northwest, northeast, southwest and southeast.

In 1984, the Federal Government approved the construction of the LRT system but plans were abandoned soon after. The LRT project was revived with the signing of an agreement for Phase 1 of the STAR-LRT (abbreviation for Sistem Transit Aliran Ringan Sdn Bhd) in December 1992. The LRT system was first opened in December 1996. This was followed by a second system operated by Projek Usahasama Transit Ringan Automatik Sdn Bhd (PUTRA-LRT) in 1998.

=== Public transport restructuring ===
The operation of Kuala Lumpur's LRT lines since its inception had lower ridership than expected, which led to the concessionaire operators of the LRT lines, being unable to repay their commercial loans. The 1997 Asian financial crisis aggravated the situation, and by November 2001, the two companies owed a combined total of RM 5.7 billion. The Malaysian Government's Corporate Debt Restructuring Committee (CDRC) stepped in to restructure the debts of the two LRT companies. In 2002, both companies and their respective LRT services were bought over by Prasarana Malaysia, and operations of the lines eventually were transferred to Rapid KL. The STAR-LRT and PUTRA-LRT lines effectively became the Ampang and Sri Petaling Lines and the Kelana Jaya Line respectively.

The Malaysian government would continue to bail out KL Infrastructure Group, which was the operator concessionaire holder and owner of the KL Monorail line, for RM 822 million. It was then promptly taken over by Prasarana Malaysia and operated by Rapid Rail in 2007.

The bus service in Kuala Lumpur was also facing problems with lower ridership due to an increase in private car usage and a lack of capital investments. The two new bus consortia formed in the mid 1990s to consolidate all bus services in Kuala Lumpur, Intrakota Komposit and Cityliner, began facing financial problems. Intrakota had reportedly accumulated losses amounting to RM450 million from the 1997 financial crisis until Prasarana Malaysia took over in 2003. With decreased revenues, the bus operators could not maintain their fleets, much less invest in more buses. Frequencies and service deteriorated as buses began breaking down, and ridership suffered as a result. Public transport usage in the Klang Valley area dropped to about 16% of all total trips as a result.

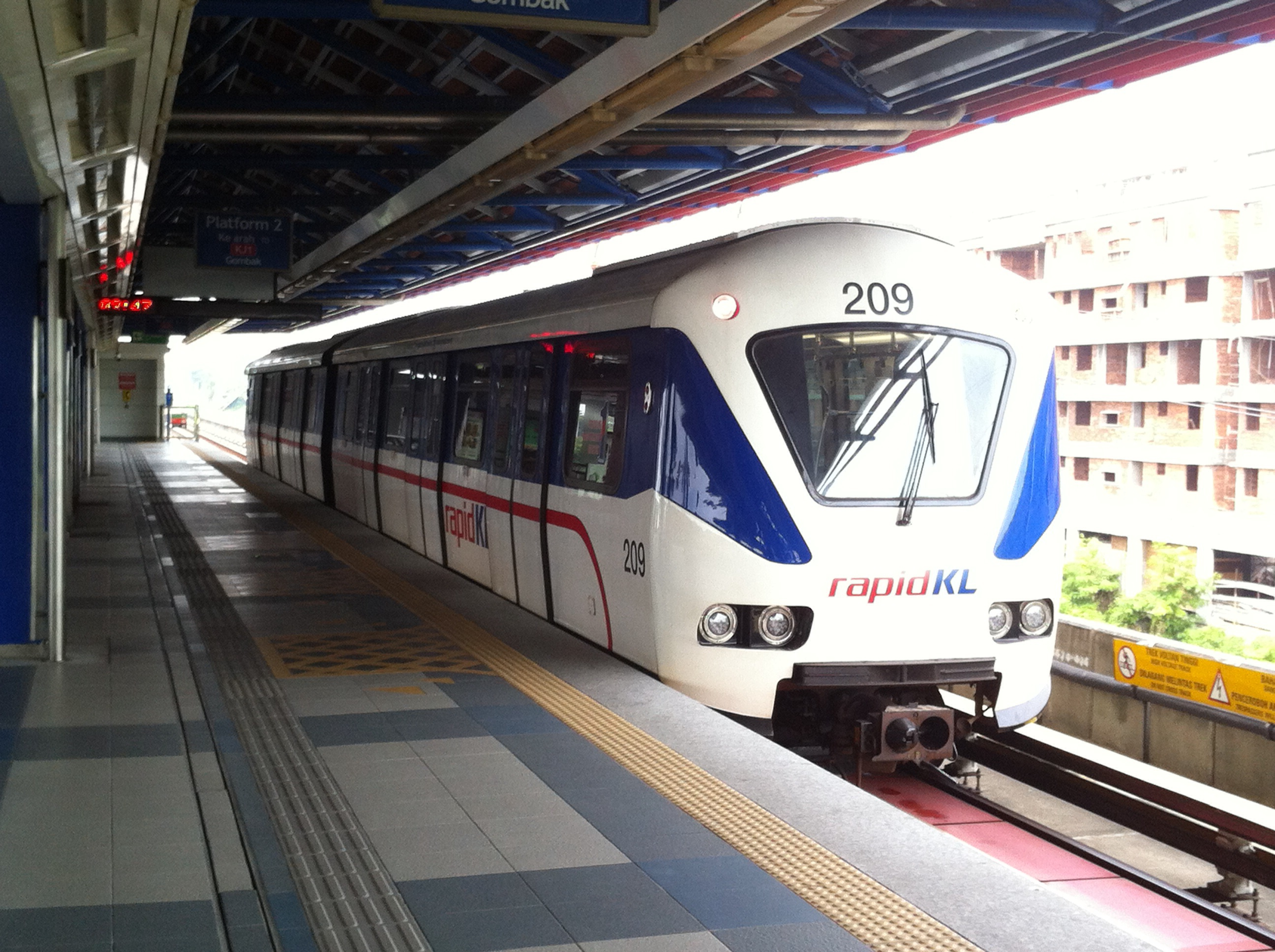
Kelana Jaya Line train Set 09 Bombardier Innovia Metro (refurbished 1st generation stock)

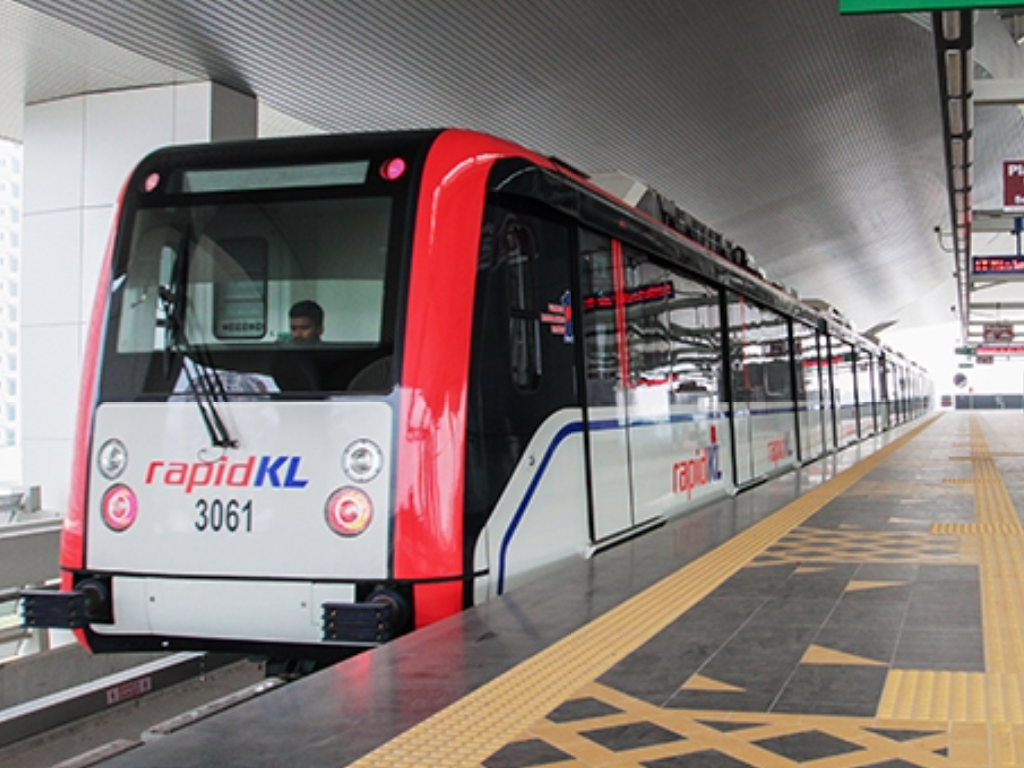
A 6-car train manufactured by CSR Zhuzhou at Awan Besar on the Sri Petaling Line.

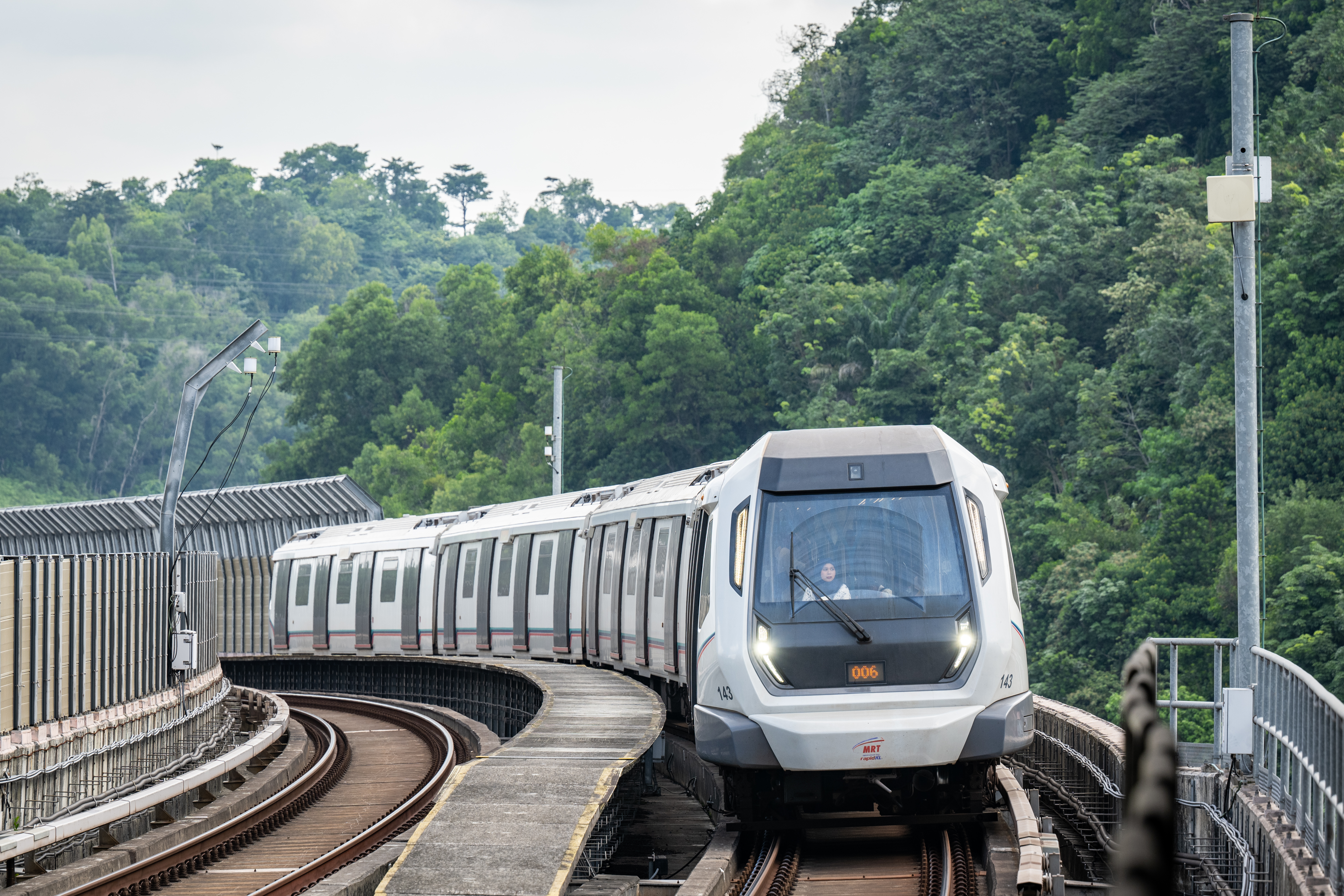
Siemens Inspiro on the Kajang Line

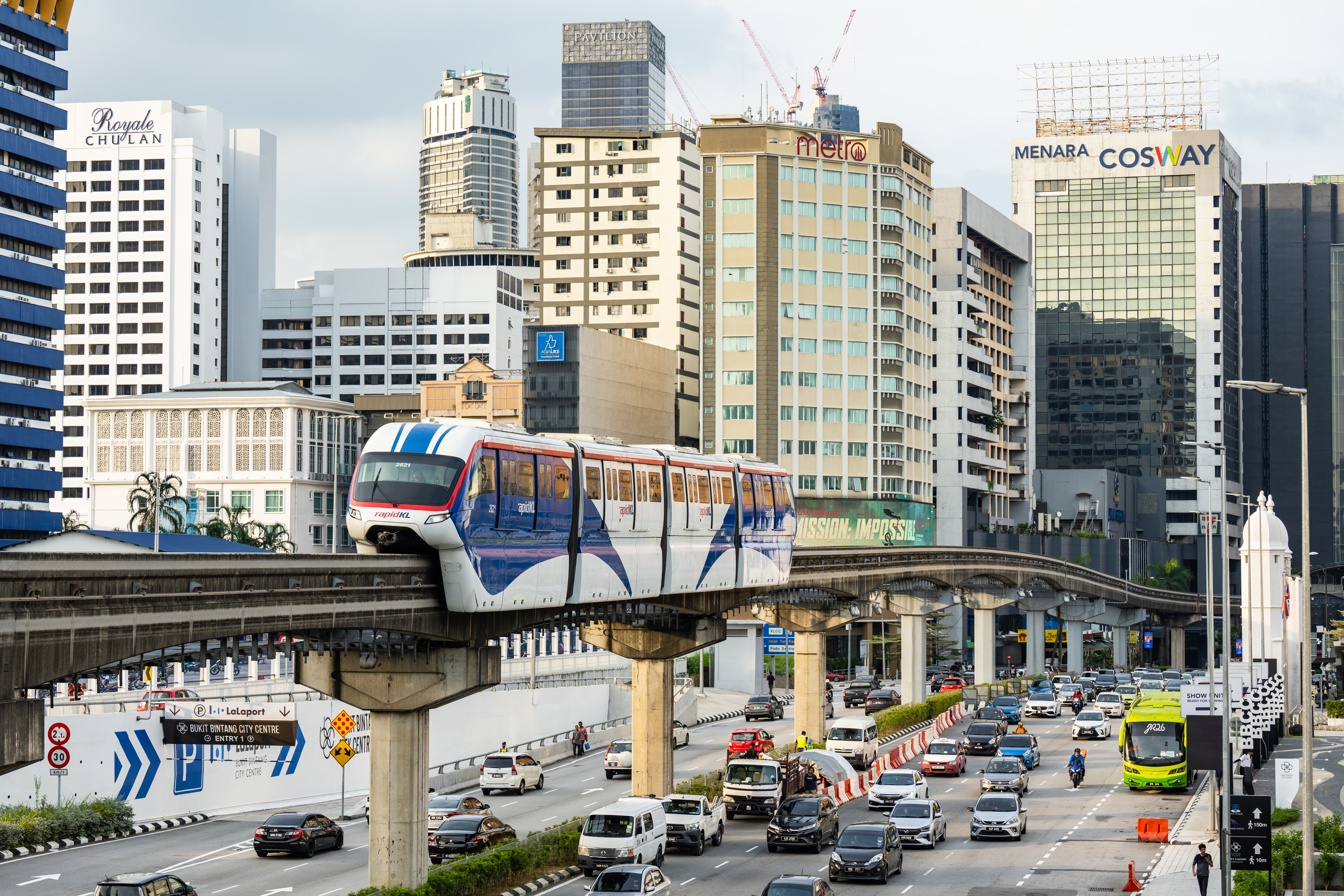
Scomi Sutra 4-car train on KL Monorail.

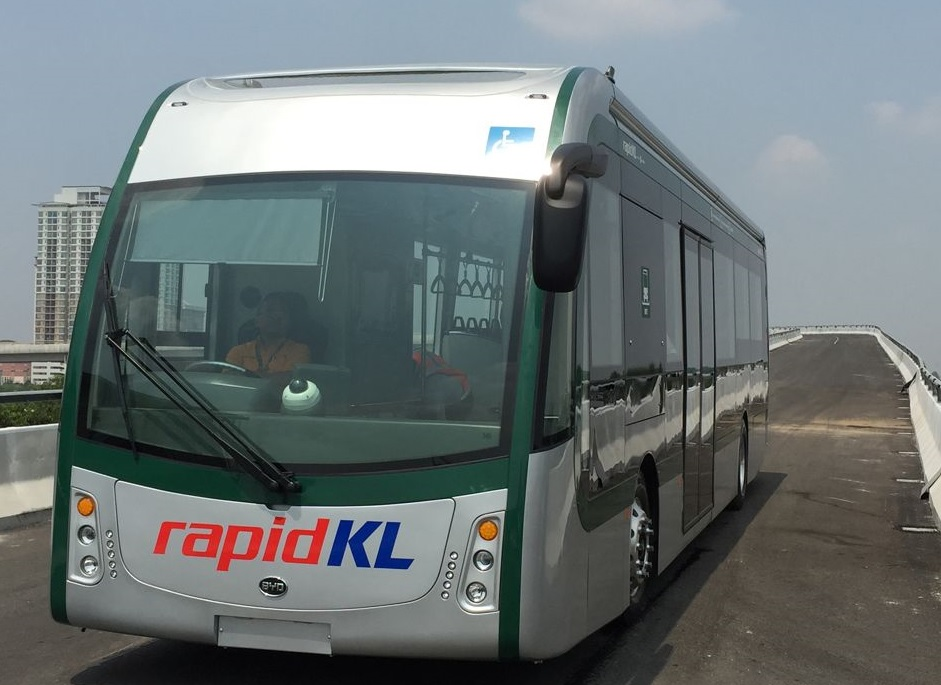
BYD K9 on the BRT Sunway Line.

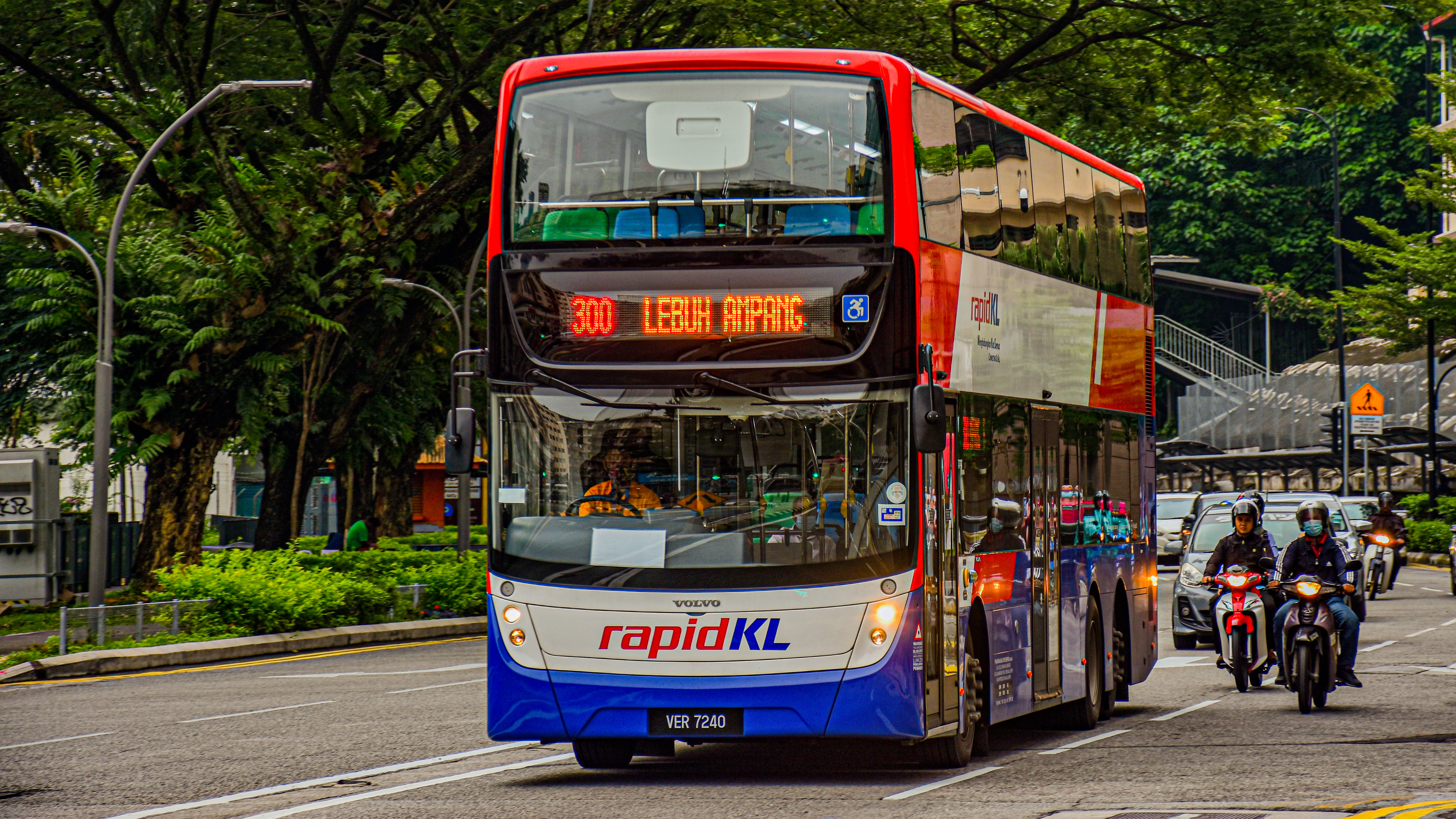
Volvo B8L on route 300 at Jalan Ampang

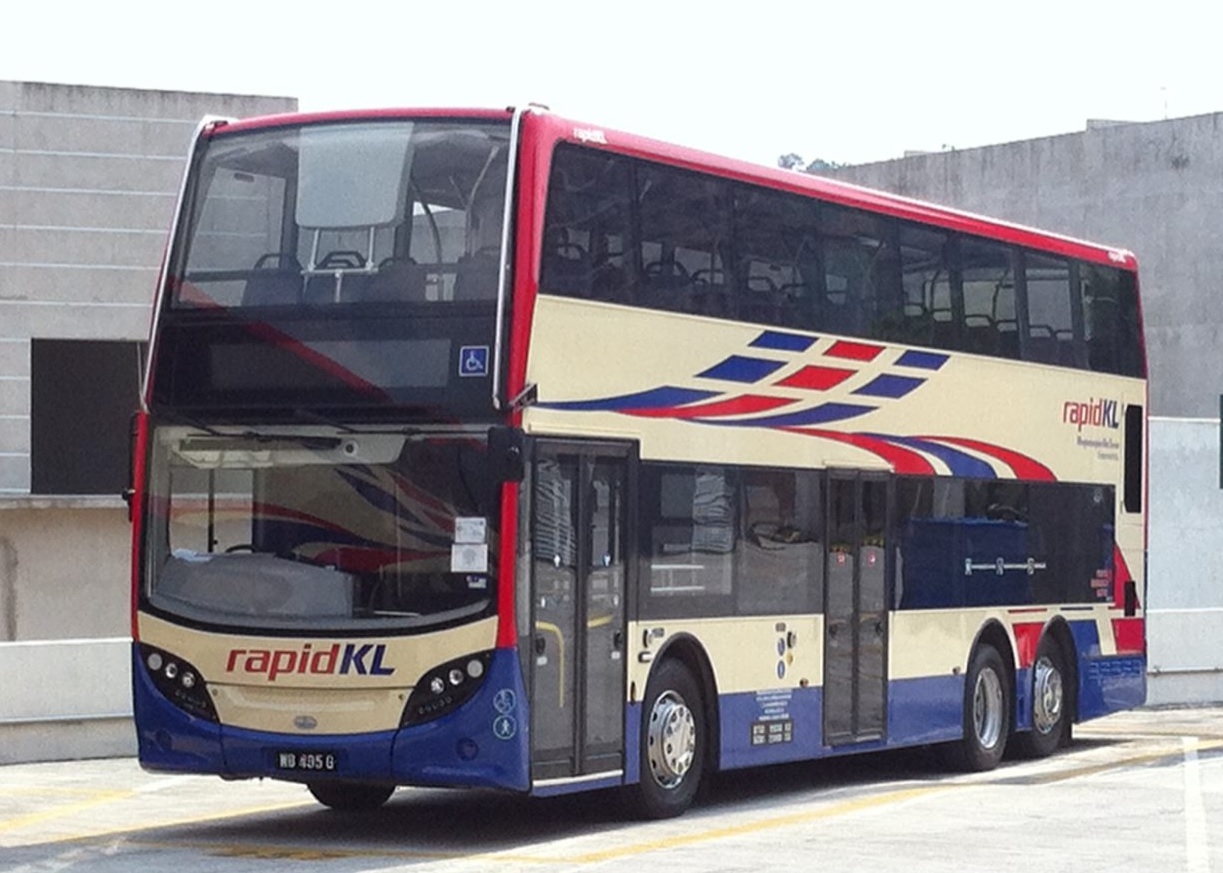
Alexander Dennis Enviro500 MMC operated by Rapid Bus at Cheras Selatan depot.

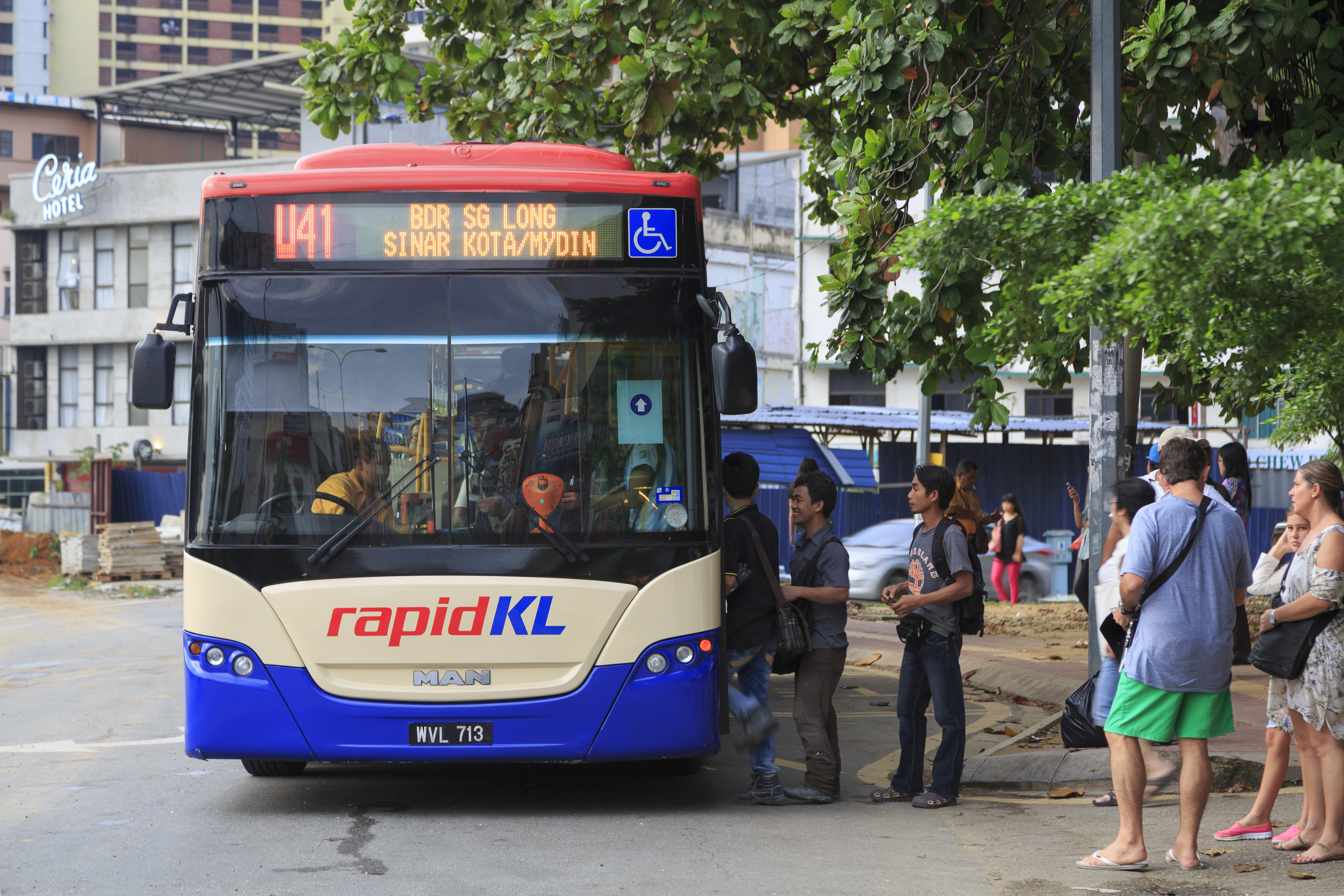
MAN 18.280 HOCL-NL at bus stop in front of Hotel Furama, Jalan Pudu.

== Rail network map ==
Rapid KL rapid transit (Rail and BRT) network serving Kuala Lumpur and the Klang Valley

== Services under Rapid KL ==
=== Rail ===
The entire rail network, operated by Rapid Rail is 247.2 km (153.6 mi) long and has 162 stations. The network's trains can travel up to 80 km/h. In 2008, the rail network carried a total of over 350,000 passengers daily, and has risen significantly since then. The BRT Sunway Line, despite being operated by Rapid Bus, is a component of and integrated with the Rapid KL rail network.

==== Current services ====
| Code | Line | Stations | Length | Began operation | Termini | |
|---|---|---|---|---|---|---|
| 3 | Ampang Line | 18 | 45.1 km | 16 December 1996 | Sentul Timur | Ampang |
| 4 | Sri Petaling Line | 29 | 45.1 km | 11 July 1998 | Sentul Timur | Putra Heights |
| 5 | Kelana Jaya Line | 37 | 46.4 km | 1 September 1998 | Gombak | Putra Heights |
| 8 | KL Monorail | 11 | 8.6 km | 31 August 2003 | KL Sentral (Monorail) | Titiwangsa |
| 9 | Kajang Line | 29 | 46 km | 16 December 2016 | Kwasa Damansara | Kajang |
| 11 | Shah Alam Line | 20 | 37.8 km | 29 June 2026 | Bandar Utama | Johan Setia |
| 12 | Putrajaya Line | 36 | 57.7 km | 16 June 2022 | Kwasa Damansara | Putrajaya Sentral |
| B1 | BRT Sunway Line | 7 | 5.6 km | 2 June 2015 | Sunway-Setia Jaya | USJ 7 |
| Total | | 144 (Note: Counting interchange stations only once: Sentul Timur, Sentul, Titiwangsa, PWTC, Sultan Ismail, Bandaraya, Masjid Jamek, Plaza Rakyat, Hang Tuah, Pudu, Chan Sow Lin, Maluri, Sungai Besi, Pasar Seni, Putra Heights, USJ 7, Glenmarie, Bandar Utama, Tun Razak Exchange and Kwasa Damansara. KL Sentral (Kelana Jaya Line and KL Monorail), Bukit Bintang (KL Monorail and Kajang Line) & Ampang Park (Kelana Jaya Line and Putrajaya Line) are not actual interchange stations despite the similar name, i.e. there is no paid-to-paid integration between those stations and are structurally separate stations. There is paid-to-paid integration between Merdeka (Kajang Line) and Plaza Rakyat (Ampang Line/Sri Petaling Line) stations, however, they are operationally and structurally separate stations.) | 247.2 km | | | |

==== Future services ====
| Code | Line | Stations | Length | Status | Planned opening | Terminal |
|---|---|---|---|---|---|---|
| 13 | Circle Line | 33 | 51.6 km | Undergoing land acquisition | 2032 | Circle route |

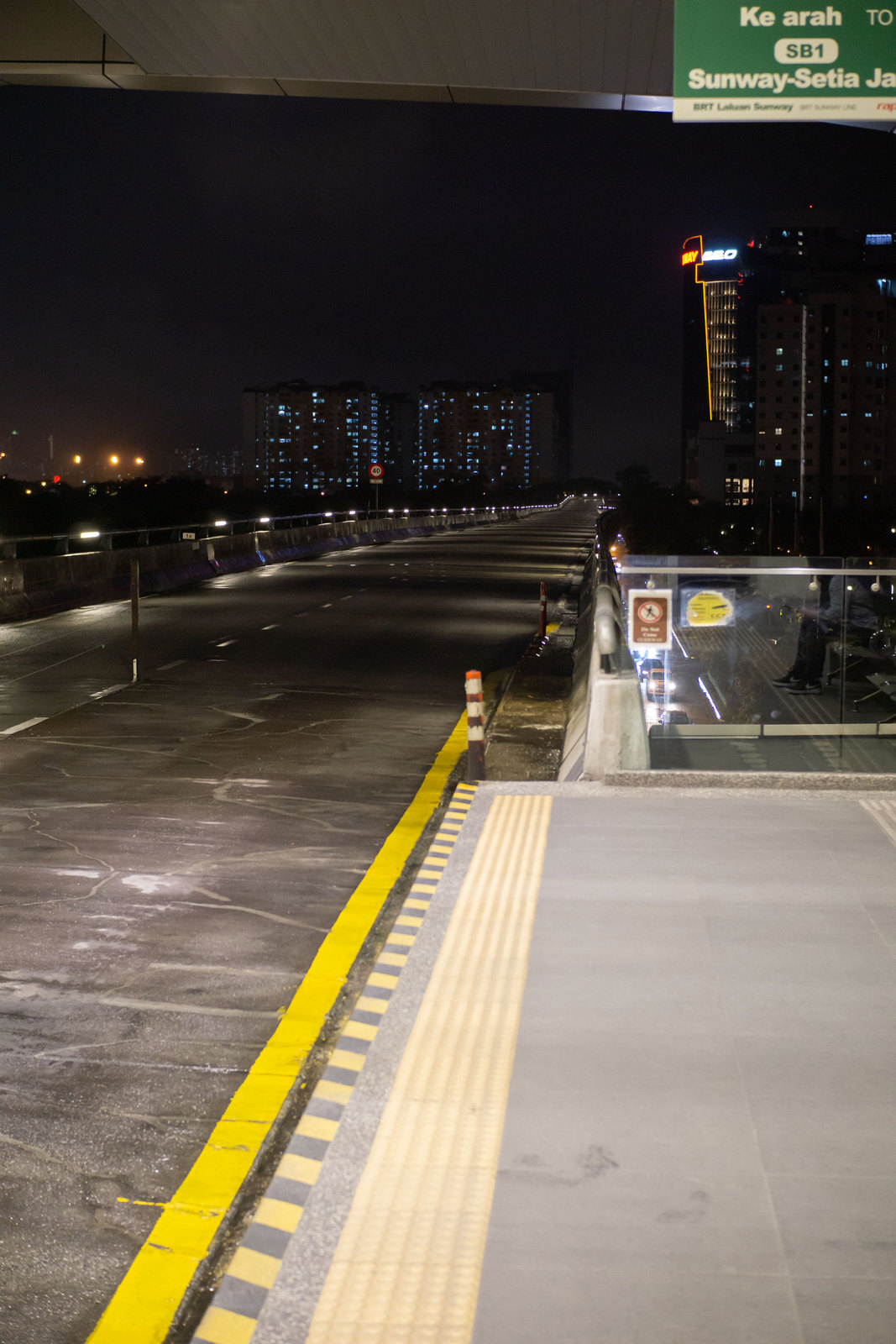
Rapid KL dedicated bus lane

=== Bus ===
The entire bus network is operated by Rapid Bus, one of the largest bus operators in the Klang Valley area, along with Transnasional. Currently, there are 98 stage bus routes and 39 feeder bus services which operate from the rail stations. The bus routes operated by Rapid Bus were previously operated by Intrakota Komposit Sdn Bhd, a subsidiary of DRB-Hicom; and Cityliner Sdn Bhd, a subsidiary of Park May Bhd. In 2008, Rapid Bus carried around 390,000 passengers daily. In addition, Rapid Bus also operates demand-responsive transit service known as Rapid On-Demand.

On 18 June 2020, Rapid Bus released new features on real time locations of bus in Google Maps, via collaboration with Google Transit. Almost 170 Rapid KL bus routes are covered with this real time feature. Rapid Bus also plans to expand the application to MRT feeder bus service, Rapid Penang, and Rapid Kuantan in the future. Now all the buses can be tracked via PULSE application.

== Fares and ticketing ==
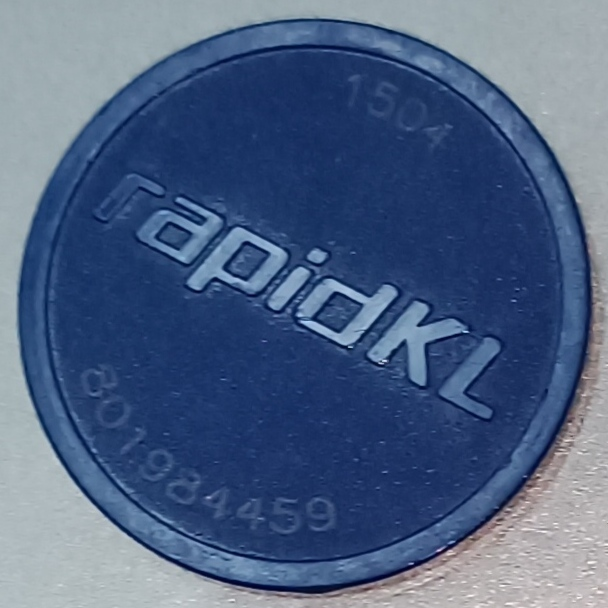
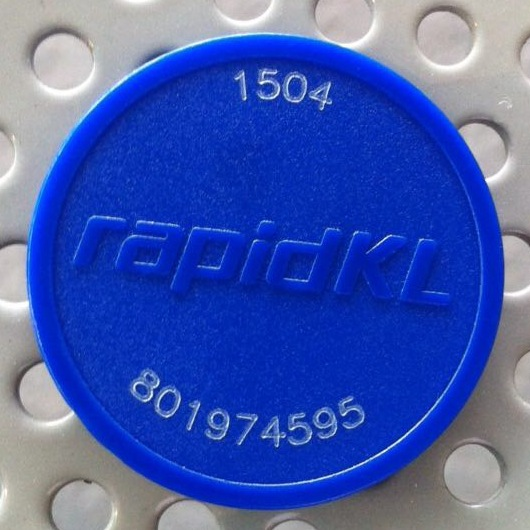
Tokens of Rapid KL rail transit.

Rapid KL's ticket vending machine interface

Rapid Rail implements an automatic fare collection system with stored value tickets and single journey tickets in the form of tokens. Tickets can be purchased either from ticket vending machines or at station counters found at all train stations. Turnstiles are located at the entrances to train platform, which separate the paid area and unpaid area of the stations. In 2011, Prasarana Malaysia announced a new ticketing system, effectively integrating the different rail lines which previously functioned as different systems. The new system allowed passengers to transfer seamlessly between rail lines at designated interchange stations without exiting the system and paying multiple fares or buying new tokens. For the LRT Shah Alam line, the ticketing system is using a QR code-based single journey ticket, with the full rollout on other lines being implemented in the future.

Touch 'n Go stored value cards are also accepted at fare gates on the Rapid Rail network, the Rapid Bus network and the KTM Komuter system to improve integration. The Touch 'n Go system is also used in the production of Rapid KL's monthly/weekly passes as well as their stored-value concession cards. These passes can be purchased by frequent users of the Rapid KL rail and bus networks, The Rapid KL concession cards are provided for students, the elderly and disabled people, which provides a 50% discount on all train and bus fares.

== Services ==
The rail services operate daily from 6 a.m. to 11 p.m. The operation hours are extended for certain stations when special events such as the Merdeka Day celebrations or the final of Piala Malaysia and the New Year's Eve countdown.

| Rail Lines | Peak-Hour Headway |
|---|---|
| Ampang Line | 5 minutes (CBD); 5 minutes (non CBD) |
| Sri Petaling Line | 5 minutes (CBD); 5 minutes (non CBD) |
| Kelana Jaya Line | 3 minutes 2 minutes (Q4 2024) |
| KL Monorail | 7 minutes 5 minutes (Q1 2026) |
| Kajang Line | 4-5 minutes |
| Shah Alam Line | 8 minutes |
| Putrajaya Line | 5 minutes |
| BRT Sunway Line | 4 minutes |

During the Movement Control Order, the waiting times between trains were extended to 10 minutes during peak hours and 30 minutes during other times, as fewer people went outside due to the lockdown.

On 10 September 2021, Rapid KL reduced its waiting times for trains and buses to support the growing number of workers going back to their reopened workplaces. On peak hours, trains arrived at around 4 to 10 minutes, on non-peak hours, trains arrived from 7 to 12 minutes, and on weekends they arrived on 7 minutes (central business district for LRT Ampang/Sri Petaling) or 15 minutes.

== Infrastructure ==
The LRT Ampang and Sri Petaling Lines are two sub-lines of a single LRT system, one a north–south line and one heading eastward. The Chan Sow Lin-Putra Heights route of the Sri Petaling Line serves the southern part of Kuala Lumpur and the town of Puchong in Selangor. The Chan Sow Lin-Ampang route of the Ampang Line primarily serves the suburbs of Ampang in Selangor and Cheras in Kuala Lumpur, both of which are located in the northeastern region of the Klang Valley. Both lines converge at Chan Sow Lin; the merged line leads north, terminating at Sentul Timur, serving the city centre.

The LRT Kelana Jaya Line consists of a single line that connects Putra Heights (where it interchanges with the Sri Petaling Line) in the south to Gombak in the northeast, passing through the cities of Subang Jaya and Petaling Jaya, as well as the Kuala Lumpur city centre and various low density residential areas further in northern Kuala Lumpur. The line has a total of 870 individual bridges, the longest of which has a 68m span. The Ampang and Sri Petaling Lines and the Kelana Jaya Line also interchange at Masjid Jamek.

The LRT Shah Alam Line is the fourth LRT line and the latest rapid transit line in the Rapid KL system. Consisting of a single line over 37.8 km, it runs from Bandar Utama in northwest Petaling Jaya (where it interchanges with the Kajang Line) to Johan Setia in south Klang, serving the city of Shah Alam along the way. It is the second rail connection serving Shah Alam and Klang, after KTM Komuter's Tanjung Malim–Port Klang Line. It is the only rapid transit train line in the Rapid KL system to be located completely outside the borders of the Federal Territory of Kuala Lumpur.

The MRT Kajang Line runs from Kajang in the south to Kwasa Damansara in the north, where it meets the MRT Putrajaya Line. The Putrajaya Line then proceeds southward towards Putrajaya Sentral. Both lines pass through Kuala Lumpur. The Kajang Line and Putrajaya Line serve to connect the city with the fringes of the Klang Valley, such as Sungai Buloh, Putrajaya, Cyberjaya, and Kajang, while also providing rail connection to neighbouring towns and cities such as Petaling Jaya (Damansara), Seri Kembangan and Cheras.

The KL Monorail connects the KL Sentral transport hub in the south and Titiwangsa in the north with the "Golden Triangle", a commercial, shopping, and entertainment area in the heart of Kuala Lumpur, consisting of the Bukit Bintang area, and surrounded by Jalan Imbi, Jalan Bukit Bintang, Jalan Sultan Ismail, and Jalan Raja Chulan.

The BRT Sunway Line, the world's first all-electric bus rapid transit (BRT) system, has an exclusive right-of-way and operates on an elevated guideway that is not shared with normal road traffic. The BRT line serves the high-density areas of Sunway and Subang Jaya. The line interchanges with the Kelana Jaya Line at USJ 7.

=== Stations ===
Since the LRT Kelana Jaya Line and the LRT Ampang and Sri Petaling Lines were intended to be operated by different owners during the planning and construction phase, both lines have unique and distinct station designs. Except for the underground section between the Pasar Seni and Damai, the entirety of the LRT Kelana Jaya Line is elevated or at-grade. The LRT Kelana Jaya Line runs in a northeast-southwesterly direction. Of a total of 37 stations, 31 are elevated, 5 are underground, and one, Sri Rampai is at-grade. The service depot is located in Subang.

The stations are styled in several types of architectural designs. Elevated stations, in most parts, were constructed in four major styles with distinctive roof designs for specific portions of the line. The KL Sentral station, added later, features a design more consistent with the Stesen Sentral station building. Underground stations, however, tend to feature unique concourse layout and vestibules, and feature floor-to-ceiling platform screen doors to prevent platform-to-track intrusions. 22 stations (including two terminal stations and the five subway stations) use a single island platform, while 15 others use two side platforms. Stations with island platforms allow easy interchange between north-bound and south-bound trains without requiring one to walk down/up to the concourse level.

On the LRT Ampang and Sri Petaling Lines, the system includes a total of 36 stations: eleven along the shared Chan Sow Lin-Sentul Timur section, seven along the Ampang-Chan Sow Lin section and eighteen along the Putra Heights-Chan Sow Lin section. The service depot and primary train depots for the system are situated before the Ampang station at the end of the Ampang-bound line, and beside the Putra Heights station at the end of Putra Heights-bound line.

The line between the Plaza Rakyat station and the Sentul Timur station is strictly elevated, with the line between the Bandaraya station and the Titiwangsa station running along the Gombak River. The Chan Sow Lin-Ampang line is primarily surface-level, while the Chan Sow Lin-Putra Heights line uses a combination of surface-level and elevated tracks.

== See also ==
- Rapid KL F.C.
