= Siemens Inspiro =

Family of electric multiple units for metro systems

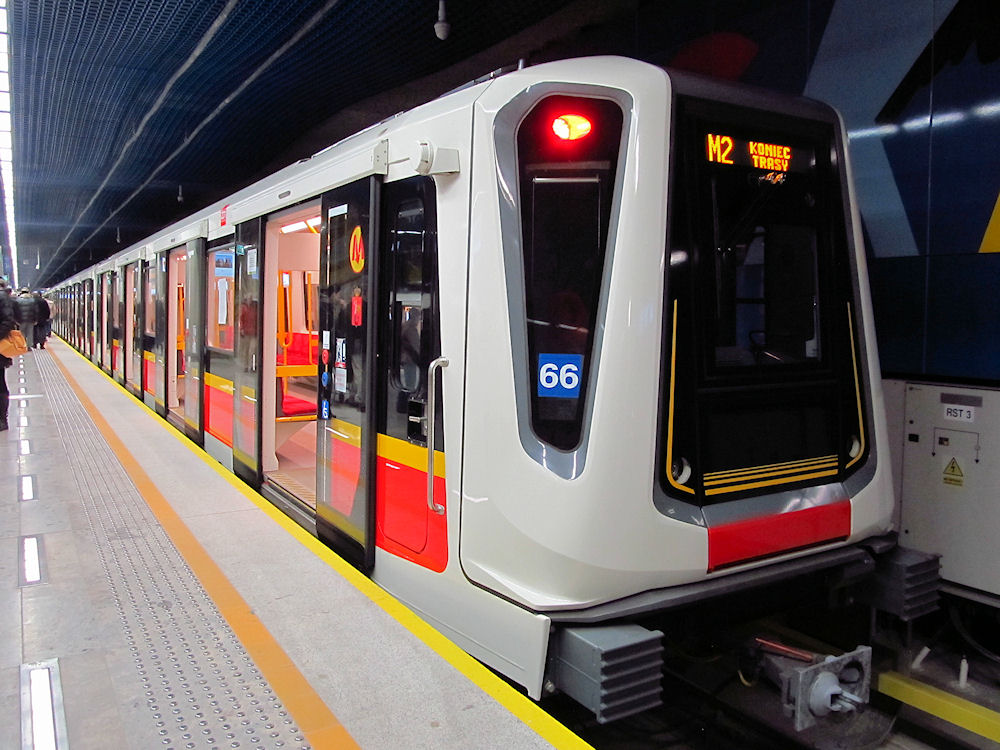
- Siemens Inspiro on M2 line of Warsaw Metro

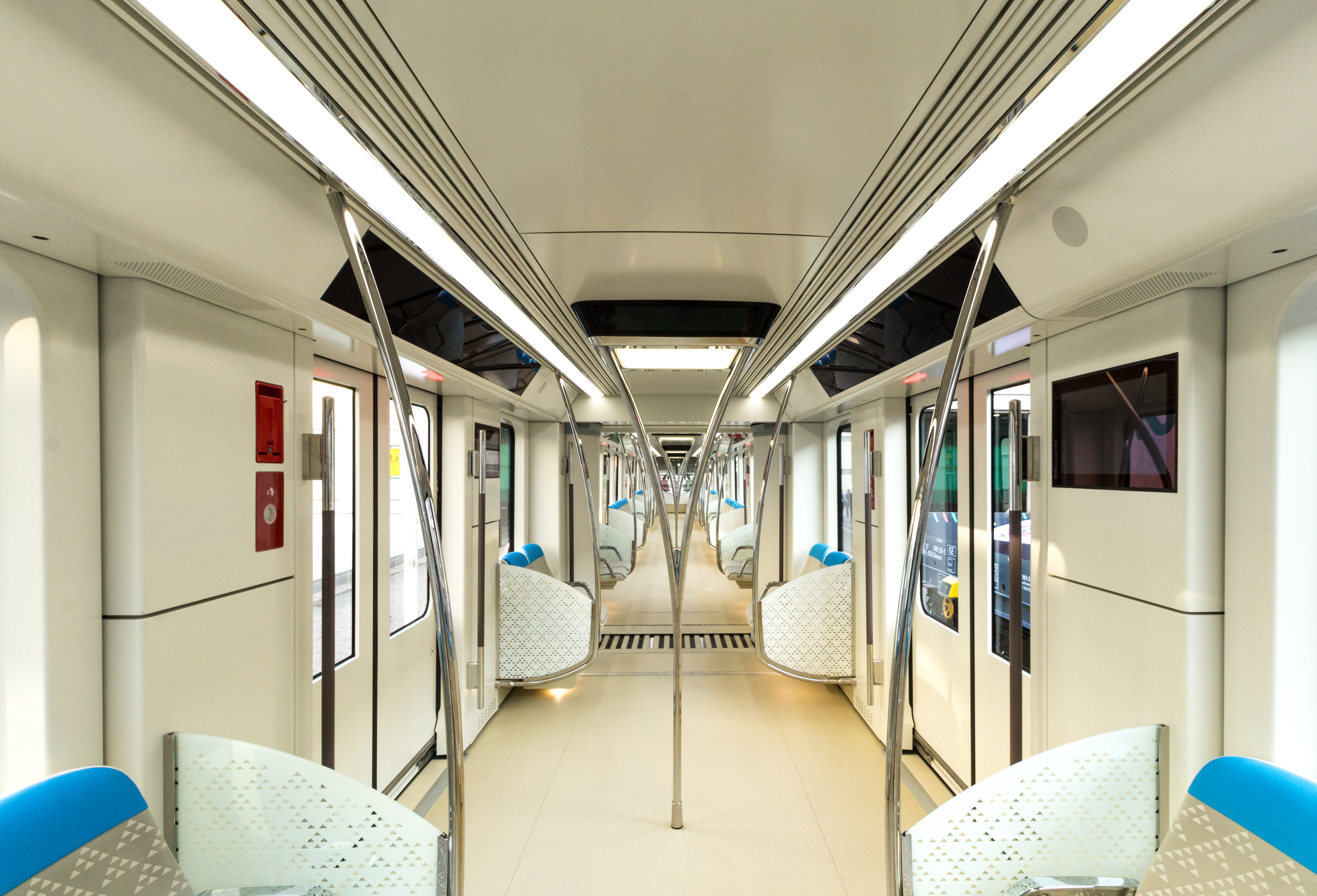
- Interior of Inspiro for Riyadh Metro.
- Stock type: EMU
- In service: 2013–present
- Manufacturer: Siemens
- Predecessor: Modular Metro
- Formation: 2–8 car sets
- Capacity: Basic configuration: 1,450 (256 seated, 1,194 standing); Variants: depends on configuration of seats and size of train and car body
- Operators: Warsaw Metro; Munich U-Bahn; Rapid Kuala Lumpur; Nuremberg U-Bahn; Sofia Metro; Vienna U-Bahn
- Lines served: M1 and M2 (Warsaw Metro); Line 9 (Rapid KL); U1 (Nuremberg U-Bahn); Line 3 (Sofia Metro)

Specifications
- Car body construction: Welded aluminium (most trains); Stainless steel (Rapid KL)
- Car length: 18.6–22 m (61 ft 0 in – 72 ft 2 in) over couplers
- Width: 2.63–3 m (8 ft 8 in – 9 ft 10 in) over door step
- Doors: 1,400 mm (4 ft 7 in) exterior sliding or sliding-plug, 2–4 per side
- Maximum speed: 80–100 km/h (50–62 mph)
- Axle load: Basic configuration: 12.6 t (12.4 long tons; 13.9 short tons); Variants: 16–17 t (16–17 long tons; 18–19 short tons)
- Traction system: Forced or natural air-cooled Siemens SIBAC IGBT–VVVF
- Electric systems: 750 V DC third rail (most trains); 1,500 V DC overhead catenary (Sofia Metro); 630–750 V DC fourth rail (London Underground); Up to 25 kV AC overhead catenary (Inspiro HC)
- Current collection: Third rail: Contact shoe; OHLE: Pantograph
- Seating: Basic configuration: Longitudinal; Variants: Transversal or mixed
- Track gauge: 1,435 mm (4 ft 8 1/2 in) standard gauge

The Siemens Inspiro is a family of electric multiple unit trains designed and manufactured by Siemens Mobility since 2012 for metro systems. The product was launched on 19 September 2012 at the InnoTrans in Berlin. The first Inspiro entered service with Warsaw Metro on 6 October 2013.

== Genesis ==
In October 2009, Siemens Mobility started development on a new subway product family. It collaborated with DesignworksUSA on design aspects. The company based its design on Modular Metro vehicles previously produced for Vienna, Oslo and Nuremberg.

== Metros using Siemens Inspiro technology ==
=== Australia ===
Siemens was awarded a contract to supply 12 3-car driverless sets for the Sydney Metro Western Sydney Airport Line. These trains will be part of the Inspiro High Capacity (Inspiro HC) family, and operate with a line voltage of 25 kV 50 Hz AC. The first trains are expected to enter service in 2027.

=== Austria ===
In September 2017, Wiener Linien ordered 34 (+ in Option 11) new subway trains for the Vienna U-Bahn called Type X from Siemens Transportation Systems to replace the older “Silberpfeil” (Type U). The first trains will be used on the U1 - U4 lines from 2023 and will be used automated on the U5 line from 2026. The Last cars operated 2030.

=== Bulgaria ===
30 new metro 3-car trainsets have been ordered for the M3 line of the Sofia Metro to enter into service April 2020. The contract includes an option for 30 additional cars to extend these trains to 4 cars long.

=== China ===
Shanghai Metro - Siemens awarded a contract to design the 22A01 metro cars and provide propulsion systems for the 22A01. The contract is for 120 cars in 40 sets. All 22A01s will be constructed by CRRC Zhuzhou Locomotives and are planned to operate on the Line 22.

=== Germany ===
MVG has ordered first 21 six-carriage trains for the Munich U-Bahn in November 2010 (Class C2.11) with second option of 22 units in 2019 (Class C2.12) and third option of 24 units in 2020 (Class C2.13), bringing the total number to 67. MVG has designated the trains as Class C2, differentiating them from C1, which wasn't based on Inspiro. The delivery began in 2012 with the last unit to be delivered in 2024.

VAG ordered 21 four-carriage trains for the Nuremberg U-Bahn in 2015, designated as G1, with the first entry into revenue service in 2020.

=== Malaysia ===
Rapid KL - Kajang line in service 4-car trainsets configuration

=== Poland ===
Warsaw Metro - in service 6-car trainsets configuration

=== Saudi Arabia ===
Riyadh Metro - in service 2-car and 4-car trainsets configuration for Line 1 and Line 2.

=== United Kingdom ===
Siemens was awarded a contract worth £1.5bn for 94 nine-car sets, based on the Inspiro, to replace the existing 1973 Stock used on the Piccadilly line of the London Underground. The first of the type is expected to enter service in the second half of 2026. There are also options for a total of 250 trains allowing replacement of all existing trains on the deep-level Central, Waterloo & City and Bakerloo lines.

== Gallery ==
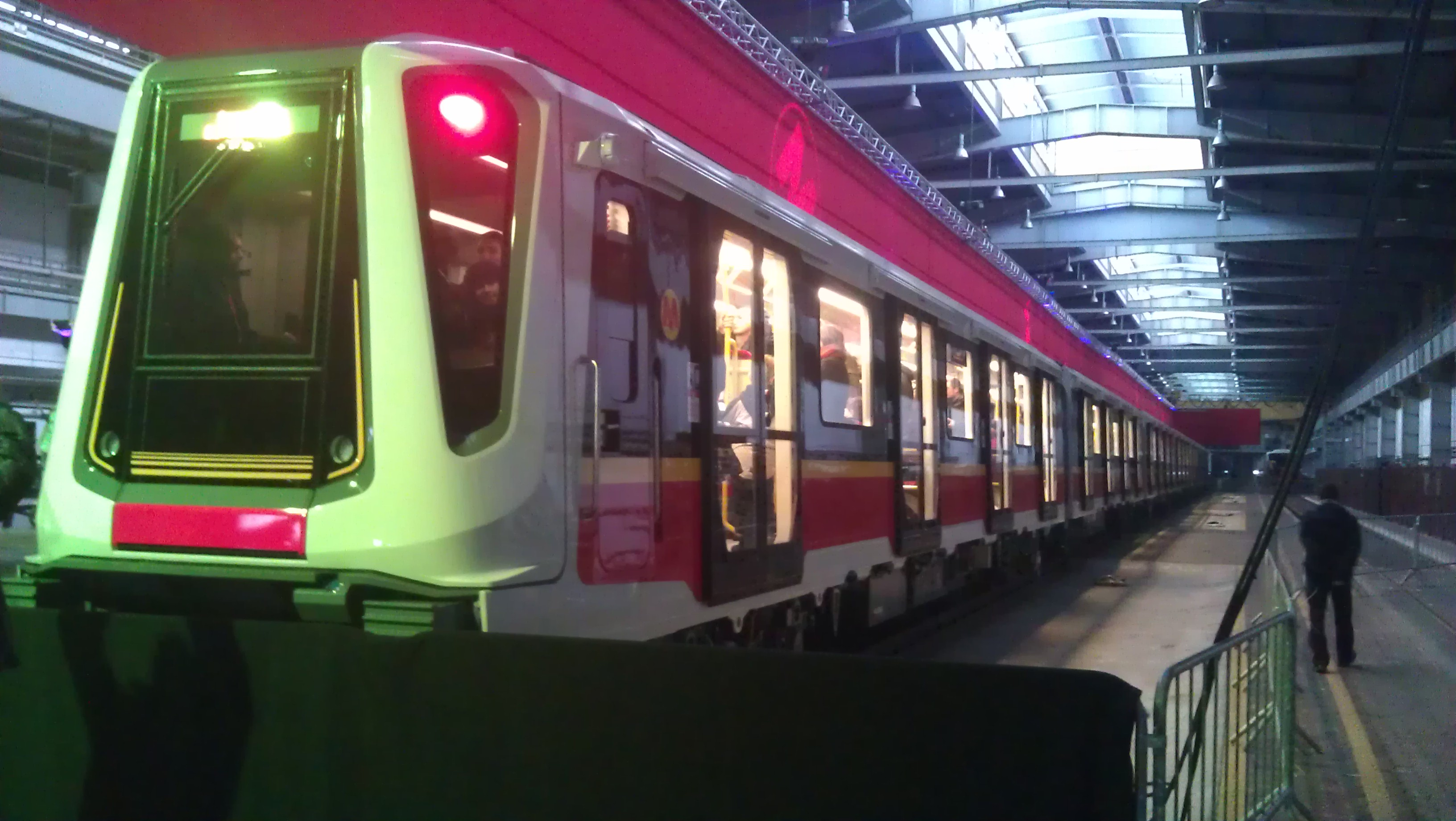
Warsaw Metro train at Kabaty depot.

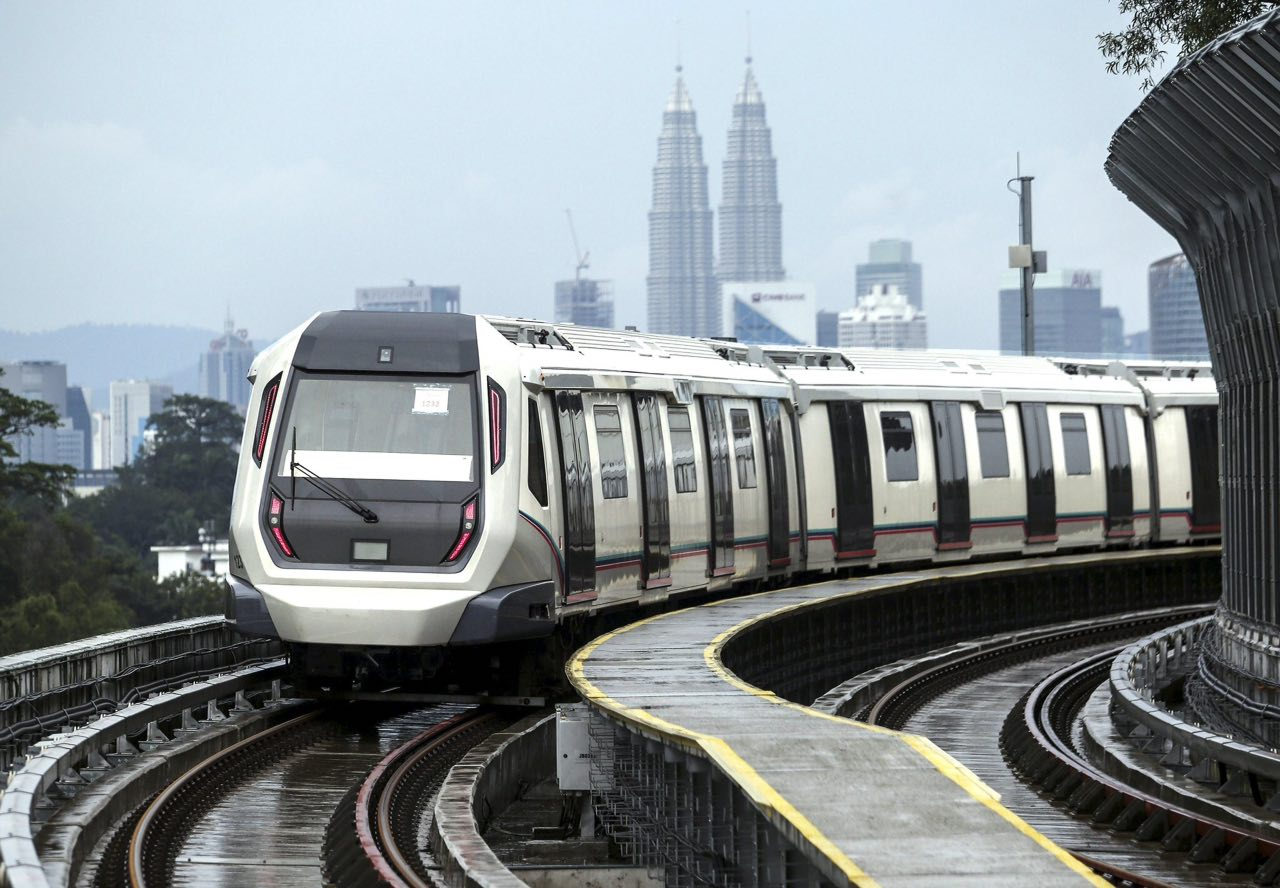
Rapid KL train at Semantan

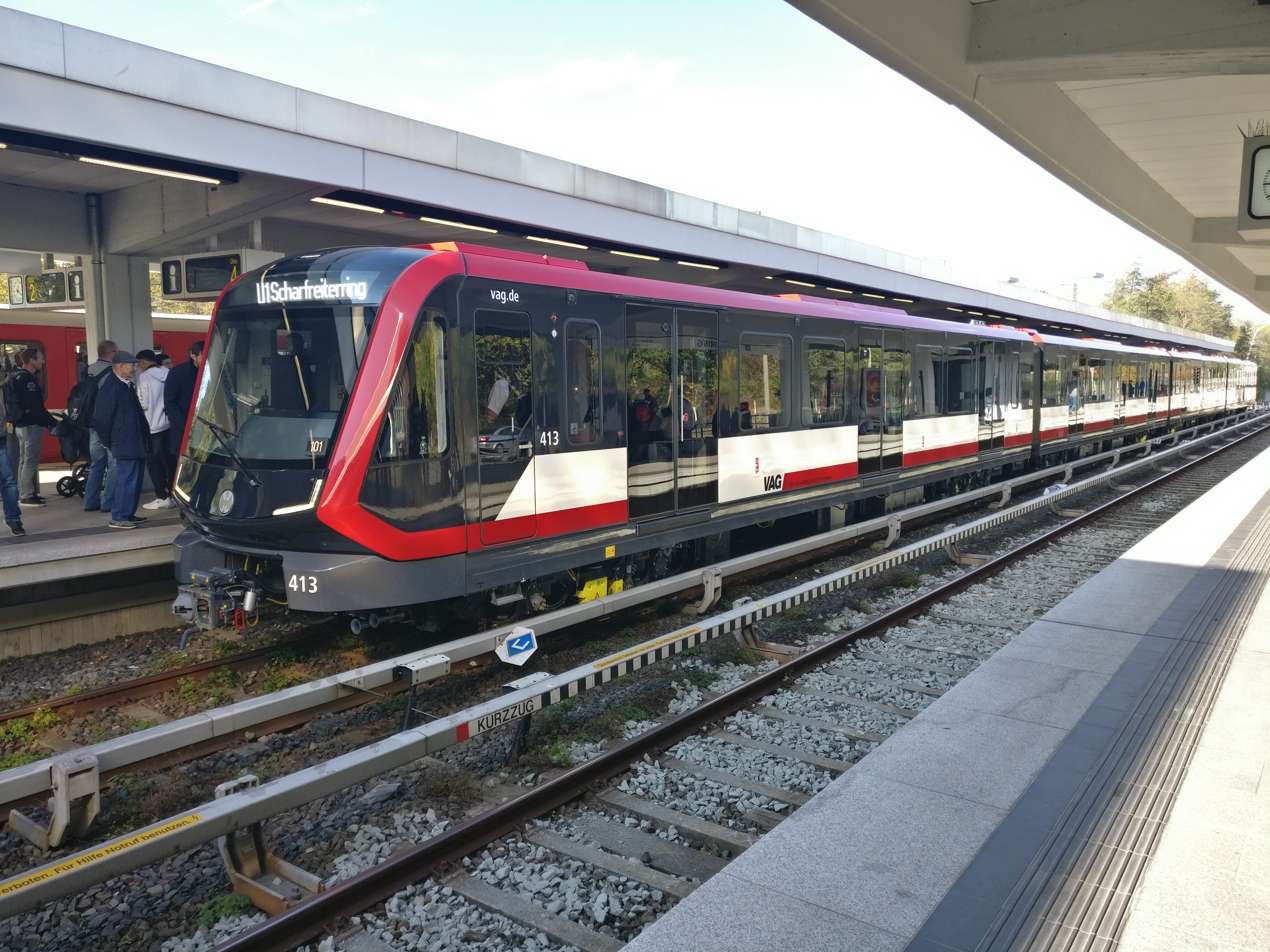
Inspiro Typ G1 rolling stock for Nuremberg U-Bahn

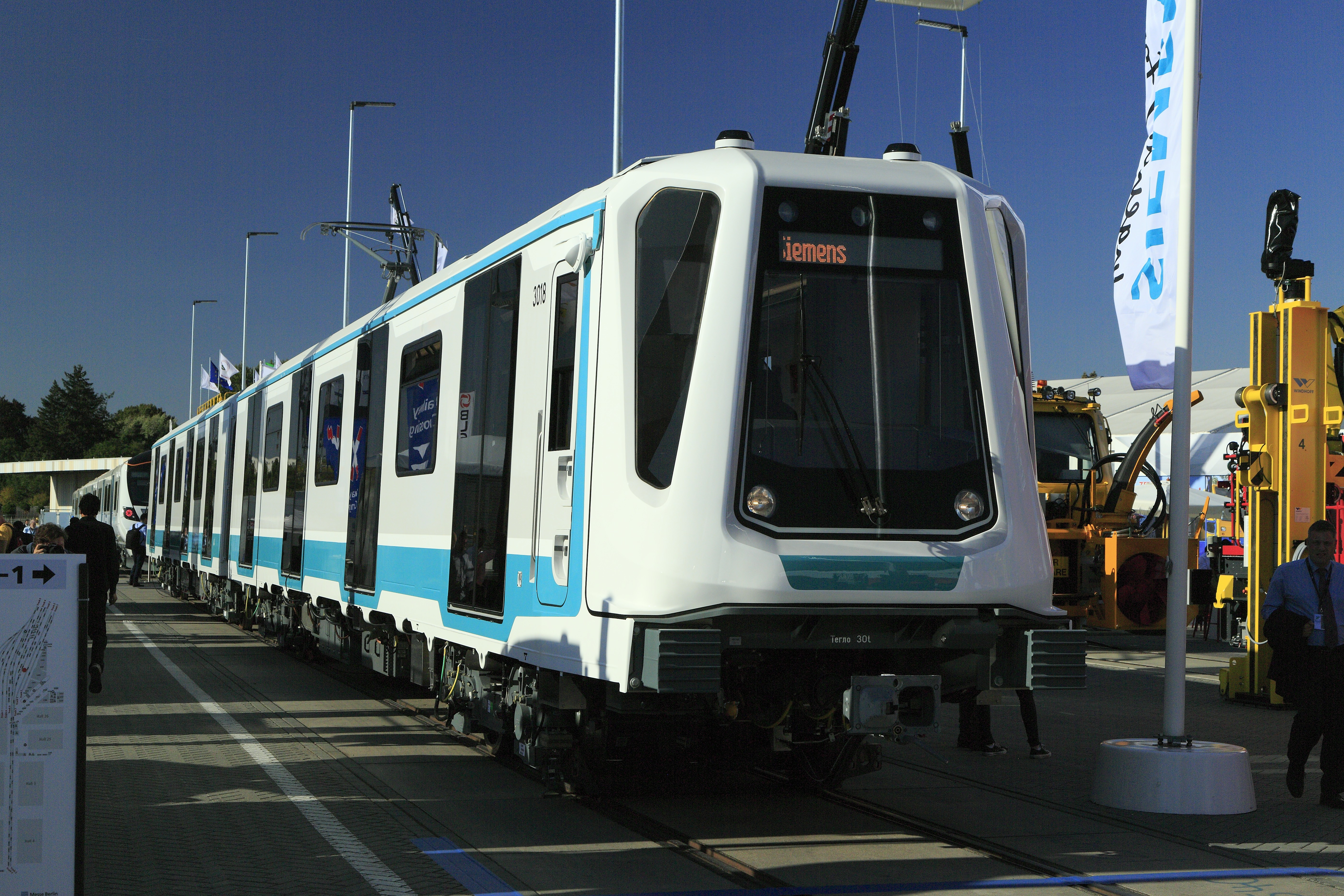
Sofia Metro new rolling stock.

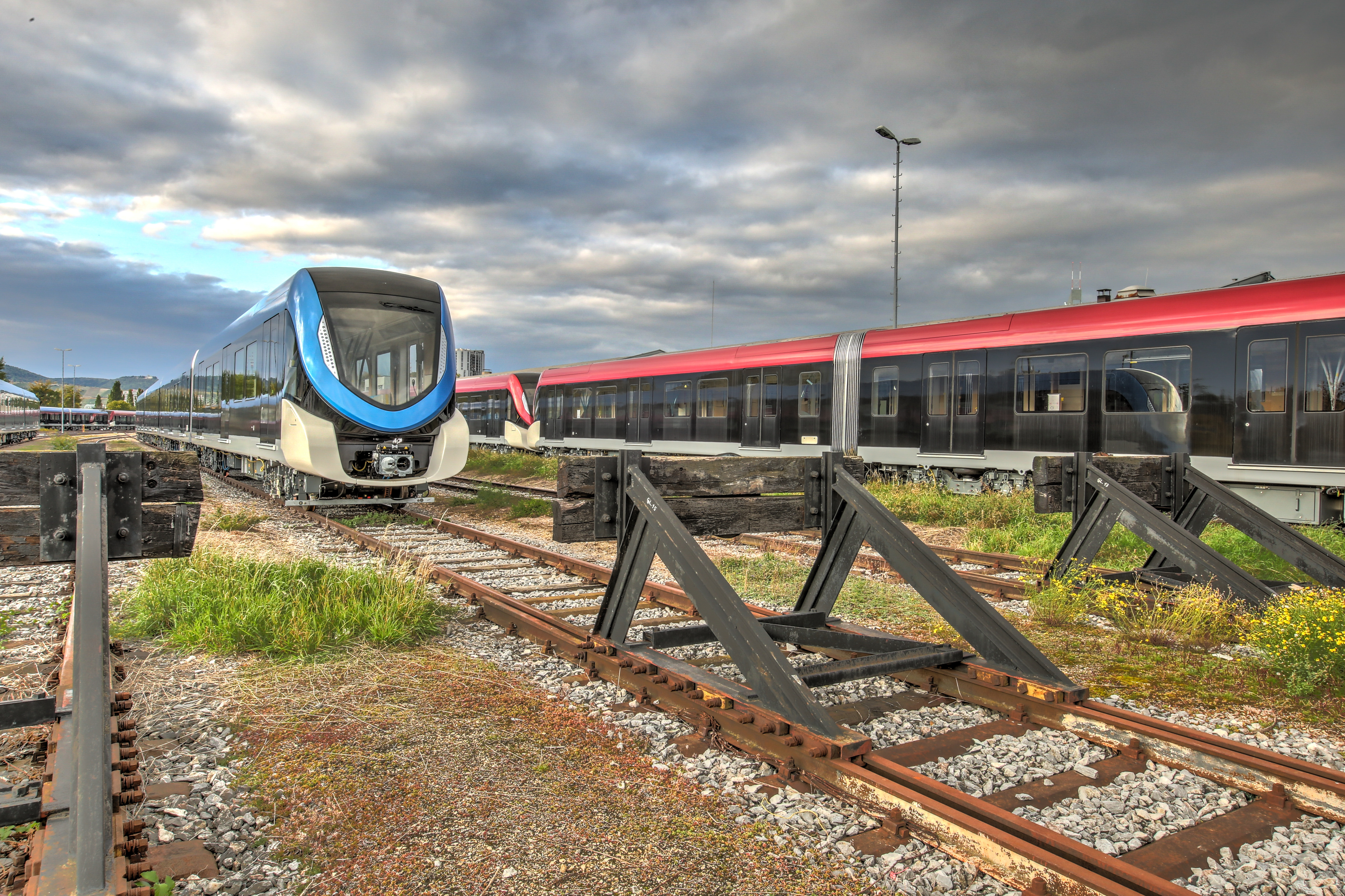
Riyadh Metro rolling stock for the Blue and Red Lines.

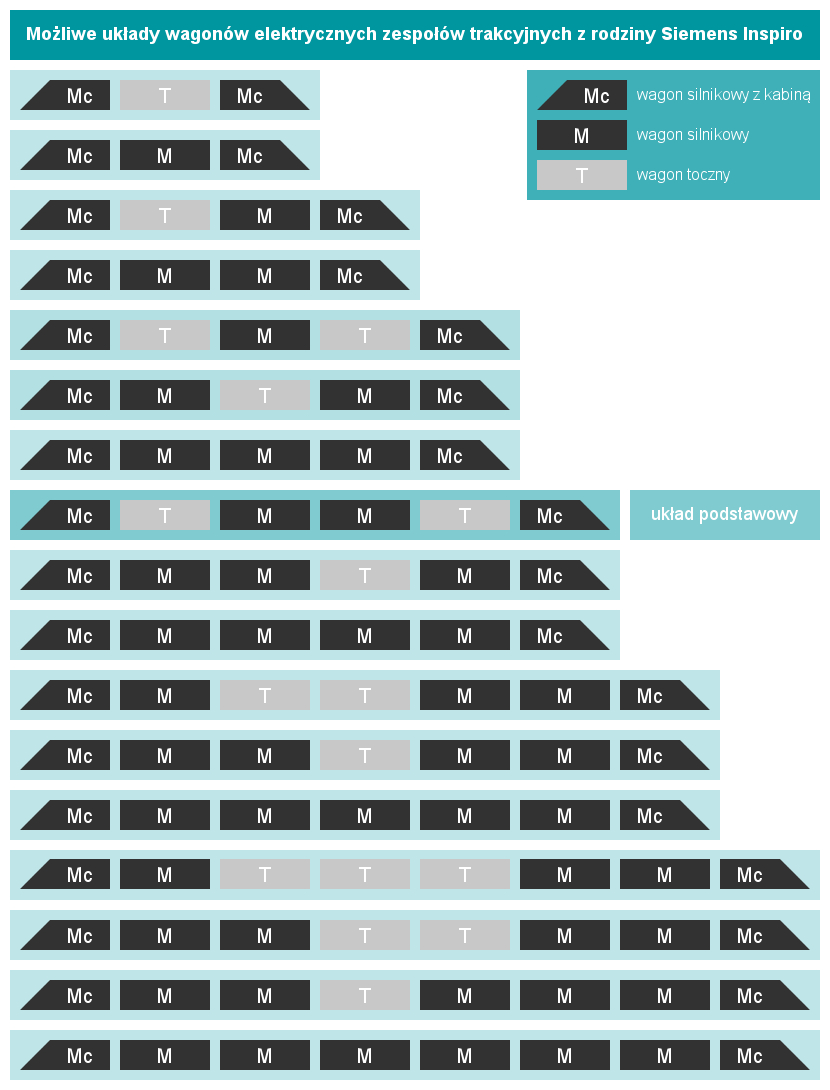
Siemens Inspiro trainset platform

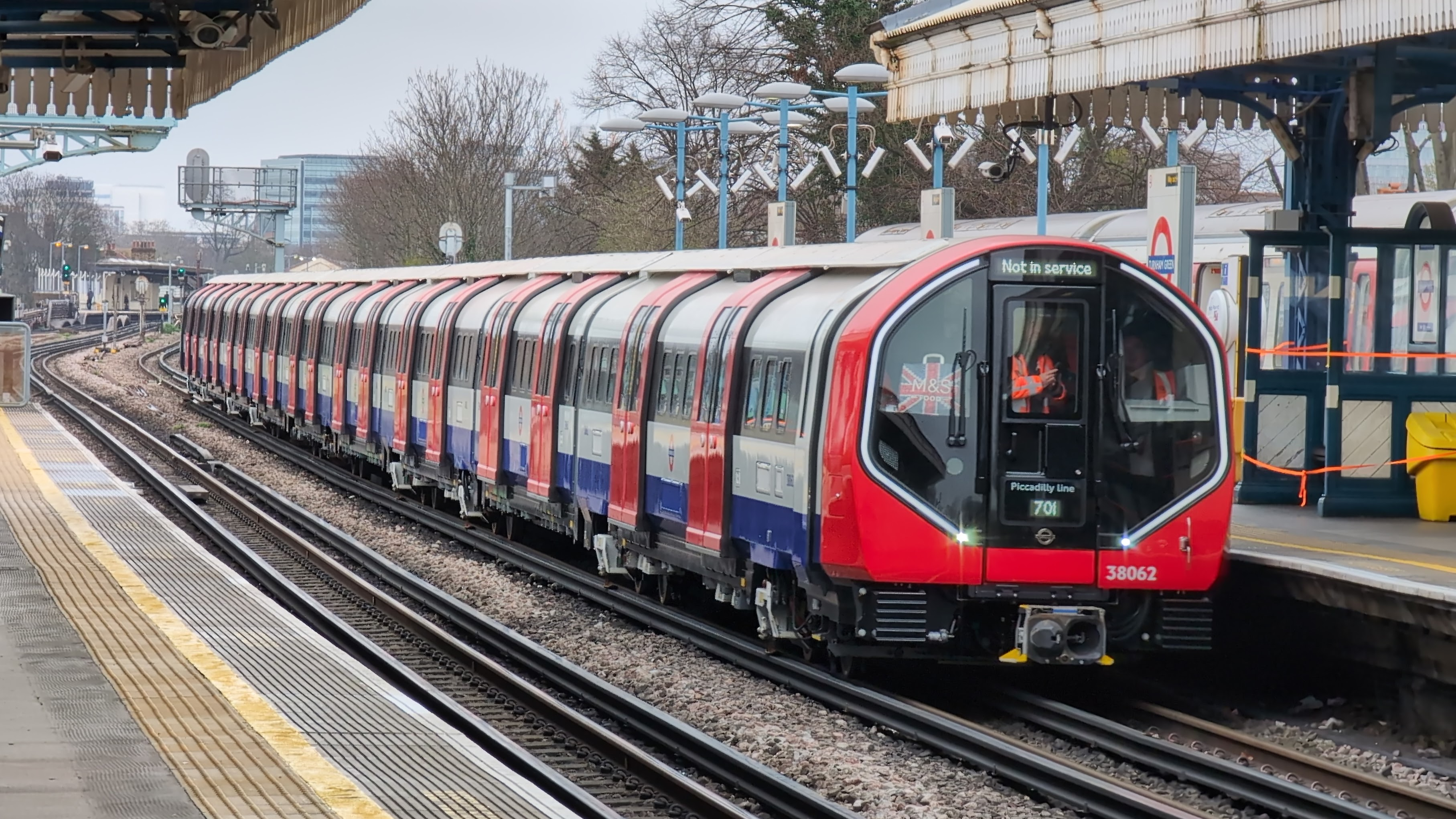
London Underground 2024 Stock at Turnham Green tube station

== See also ==
- Alstom Metropolis and Movia
