= Bandar Mahkota Cheras =

Township in Cheras, Hulu Langat, Selangor, Malaysia

Coordinates: 3.0547965°N 101.7899835°E

Bandar Mahkota Cheras, often referred to by its initials BMC, is a township in Cheras, Hulu Langat, Selangor, Malaysia. It was developed by Narajaya Sdn Bhd, a subsidiary of Lion Group. Construction commenced in late 1999 or early 2000 on a freehold plot of about 365 hectares. Mostly consisting of two-storey terraced houses, the population is estimated to be in excess of 50,000 in more than 10,000 households. The main township is divided into eight sections and also includes a few smaller developments by other developers in the same township, e.g., Cheras Vista and Pinggiran Mahkota Cheras. It is located in the mukim (sub-district) of Cheras, daerah (district) of Hulu Langat and state of Selangor. It borders Bandar Sungai Long to the north and west.

== Administration ==
The township is under the administration of local government Kajang Municipal Council (MPKj). The MPKj Councillor of the township is Lim Kim Eng of the People's Justice Party (PKR), a component party of the Pakatan Harapan (PH) coalition. The township is also within the Kajang state constituency of the Selangor State Legislative Assembly and the Bangi federal constituency of the Dewan Rakyat of Parliament. Kajang is represented by Member of the Legislative Assembly (MLA) David Cheong Kian Young of PKR and PH while Bangi is by Member of Parliament (MP) Syahredzan Johan of the Democratic Action Party (DAP) and PH.

== Amenities ==
The main commercial centre in the middle of the township, called the Mahkota Walk, has many restaurants, convenience shops, clinics, and hardware shops. A shopping complex, BMC Mall is there. A Tamil vernacular primary school is also located in the township, namely Sekolah Jenis Kebangsaan Tamil (SJKT) Bandar Mahkota Cheras. There are several suraus in the area plus a Chinese temple and a Hindu temple. Several banks such as Hong Leong Bank, Public Bank and RHB Bank have opened branches there. There is also a small recreational park within the commercial centre and opened to the public.

== Accessibility ==
Bandar Mahkota Cheras can be accessed from the Cheras–Kajang Expressway at 10th Mile Cheras (via Tun Hussein Onn exit). Other access points are from the Kajang Dispersal Link Expressway exit via Sungai Long as well as the East Klang Valley Expressway, which directly has an exit point at BMC itself. In the township itself, there are two main dual carriageway roads, Persiaran Mahkota Cheras 1 and 2 running through BMC. However, there is heavy traffic at the road exiting to the Cheras-Kajang Expressway, especially during peak hours.

The township is also connected to MRT Kajang Line via feeder bus T415, which links Bandar Mahkota Cheras to Bandar Tun Hussein Onn MRT station and to Kuala Lumpur through RapidKL bus number 590 (Bandar Sungai Long - HAB Lebuh Pudu).
