= Taman Cuepacs =

Human settlement in Malaysia

Coordinates: 3.082241°N 101.7555403°E

Taman CUEPACS is a major township in Cheras, Selangor, Malaysia. It is located near Pasukan Gerakan Am (PGA) police base. The township gets its name from the abbreviation of CUEPACS which means Congress of Unions of Employees in the Public and Civil Services.

== Connections ==
Taman CUEPACS is connected through the Cheras–Kajang Expressway (part of Federal Route 1), which is the main carriageway to Kajang and Seremban. It is also connected to Ampang through Jalan Hulu Langat.

The township is located next to Taman Suntex MRT station, on the Sungai Buloh–Kajang Line. It is intended to serve the locality of surrounding housing estates with huge population, including Taman Fern Grove, Cheras Permata, Taman Alam Jaya, Cheras Awana, Taman Mudun, Taman Masria and more.

Taman CUEPACS had long had difficulties with traffic. However, on 18 November 2009, the Kajang Municipal Council announced that the roads in Taman CUEPACS would be upgraded. It is divided into three packages. The road-widening projects would also include the installation of traffic lights at certain junctions. The whole project will cost RM22 million and will take 33 months to complete.

== Schools and institutions ==
Taman CUEPACS has a primary school, Sekolah Kebangsaan Taman CUEPACS, which serves the locality of surrounding housing estates and students from Kajang and Semenyih. Seri Cempaka International School's Cheras branch is also located here.

== Disambiguation ==
A similarly-named housing area, Taman Koperasi CUEPACS, is located about 8 km further south along the same highway and MRT tracks, and is closer to Kajang town.
