= Sri Raya MRT station =

MRT station in Cheras, Selangor, Malaysia

Coordinates: 3°12′23″N 101°34′49″E

KG28 Sri Raya
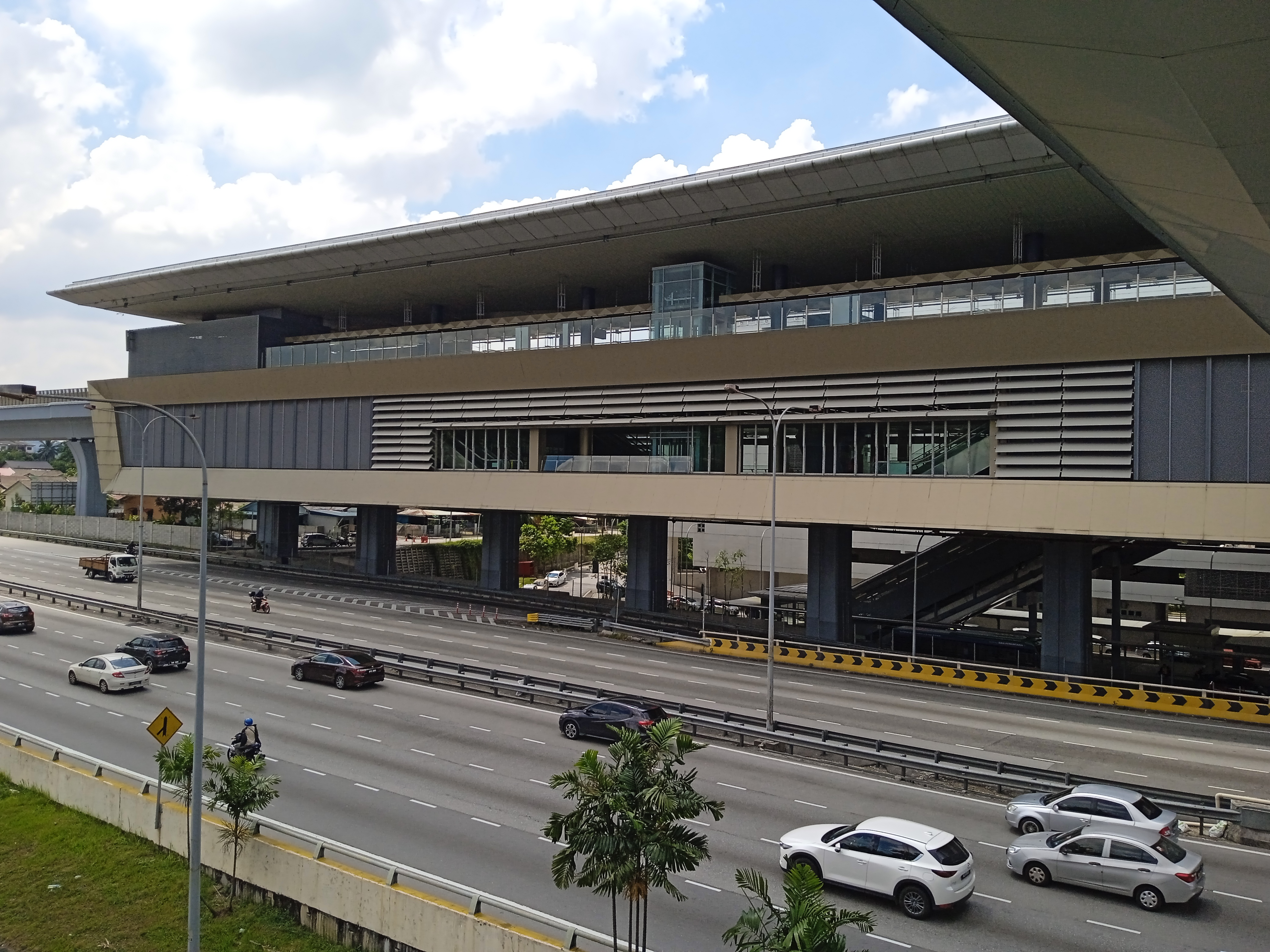

General information
- Other names: Malay: سري راي (Jawi); Chinese: 斯里拉也; Tamil: ஸ்ரீ ராயா
- Location: Persiaran Sri Raya, Taman Sri Raya; 43200 Cheras; Selangor; Malaysia
- System: Rapid KL
- Owner: MRT Corp
- Operator: Rapid Rail
- Line: 9 Kajang Line
- Platforms: 2 side platforms
- Tracks: 2

Construction
- Structure type: Elevated
- Parking: Available
- Cycle facilities: Not available
- Accessible: Yes

Other information
- Station code: KG28

History
- Opened: 17 July 2017; 9 years ago
- Former names: Taman Cuepacs

Services
Preceding station		Following station
Taman Suntex towards Kwasa Damansara	Kajang Line	Bandar Tun Hussein Onn towards Kajang
Location

The Sri Raya MRT station is a mass rapid transit (MRT) station serving the suburb of Batu 10 Cheras, Selangor, Malaysia. It serves as one of the stations on MRT Kajang Line. The station is located at the Telekom interchange of the Cheras–Kajang Expressway (CKE).

== Background ==
The name Sri Raya comes from the village of Kampung Sri Raya. Sri Raya is a residential area located in the south of Cheras. Residential areas near the MRT station include Taman Megah Cheras, Taman Cheras Permai, Taman Kota Cheras and Taman Sri Aman.

== Station Background ==
=== Station Layout ===
The station has a layout and design similar to that of most other elevated stations on the line (except the termini), with the platform level on the topmost floor, consisting of two sheltered side platforms along a double-tracked line and a single concourse housing ticketing facilities between the ground level and the platform level. All levels are linked by lifts, stairways and escalators.

L2	Platform Level	Side platform
L2	Platform Level	Platform 1: 9 Kajang Line towards KG35 Kajang (→)
L2	Platform Level	Platform 2: 9 Kajang Line towards KG04 Kwasa Damansara (←)
L2	Platform Level	Side platform
L1	Concourse	Faregates, Ticketing Machines, Customer Service Office, Station Control, Shops, pedestrian walkway to Taman Kota Cheras 1, MRT Park & Ride
G	Ground Level	Entrance A, B and C, Feeder Bus Stop, Taxi Lay-By, Persiaran Sri Raya, Jalan Hulu Langat

=== Exits and entrances ===
The station has three entrances. Entrance C provides a direct pedestrian link to Taman Kota Cheras across the Cheras–Kajang Expressway. The feeder buses operate from the station's feeder bus hub via Entrance A, within the station area.

Kajang Line station
Entrance	Location	Destination	Picture
A	Taman Sri Raya (A)	Feeder bus hub, Persiaran Sri Raya	
B	Taman Sri Raya (B)	Taxi and private vehicle lay-by, Persiaran Sri Raya, Jalan Hulu Langat	
C	Taman Kota Cheras	Taman Kota Cheras, Jalan Kota Cheras	

== Bus Services ==
=== Feeder bus services ===
With the opening of the MRT Kajang Line, feeder buses also began operating, linking the station with several housing areas and villages around the Bandar Tun Hussein Onn and Batu 10 Cheras area. The feeder buses operate from the station's feeder bus hub at Entrance A of the station.

Route No.	Origin	Destination	Via
T414	KG28 Sri Raya	Taman Tun Perak / Taman Megah	Jalan Hulu Langat; Jalan Kota Cheras; Persiaran Putri Jaya; Persiaran Tun Perak; Persiaran Suasana / Bandar Tun Hussein Onn; Jalan Megah 37; Jalan 2 Jalan Kota Cheras

=== Other Bus Services ===
The MRT station is also served by some other bus services.

Route No.	Operator	Origin	Destination	Via	Notes
450	Rapid KL	Hentian Kajang	Hub Lebuh Pudu	Reko Sentral Bandar Kajang; KG34 Stadium Kajang; KG33 Sungai Jernih; Sungai Sekamat; Simpang Balak; KG31 Bukit Dukung; Cheras–Kajang Expressway; Jalan Hulu Langat; KG28 Sri Raya (Entrance B); Batu 9 Cheras / Taman Suntex; Cheras Sentral / KG26 Taman Connaught FT 1 Cheras Highway (Jalan Cheras); KG24 Taman Midah; AG13 KG22 Maluri; Jalan Cheras; Jalan Pasar; Jalan Pudu	The bus does not enter the station area; it stops along Jalan Hulu Langat instead. Entrance B is within walking distance from this bus stop. For Kajang-bound passengers, they are required to cross Jalan Hulu Langat.
T406	Rapid KL	Taman Kota Cheras 1 (Hub TM Batu 10 Cheras)	Pangsun, Hulu Langat / Sungai Lui	Pangsun / Sungai Lui Bound; Jalan Kota Cheras KG28 Sri Raya (Entrance C); Cheras–Kajang Expressway; Batu 9 Cheras / Taman Suntex; Jalan Hulu Langat; Bukit Raya; Sungai Serai; Kampung Nanding; Batu 14 Langat; Dusun Tua; Batu 18 Langat Pangsun Bound; Lubuk Kelubi; Kuala Pangsun Sungai Lui Bound; Batu 20 Hulu Langat; Sungai Lui; Kampung Ulu Lui	The bus will operate separately for both Pangsun and Sungai Lui- bound routes. This route will separate at the Batu 18 Langat area. The following are the schedules of the bus route: Pangsun to Batu 10 Cheras First bus: 0530h, Last bus: 2345h (Frequency 30-70 minutes) Sungai Lui to Batu 10 Cheras First bus: 0630h, Last bus: 2035h (Frequency 70-75 minutes) Batu 10 Cheras to Pangsun First bus: 0710h, Last bus: 2335h (Frequency 60-70 minutes) Batu 10 Cheras to Sungai Lui First bus: 0635h, Last bus: 1925h (Frequency 70 minutes)

== See also ==
- Prasarana Malaysia
- Land Public Transport Agency
- Public transport in Kuala Lumpur
- Buses in Kuala Lumpur
- Klang Valley Integrated Transit System
- List of rail transit stations in Klang Valley
