= Karambunai Integrated Resort City =

Resort in Sabah, Malaysia

General information
- Status: On hold
- Location: Sabah, Kota Kinabalu, Malaysia
- Construction started: 2012
- Estimated completion: 2019
- Cost: MYR9.6 billion
- Owner: Karambunai Corp Bhd; Petaling Tin Berhad

The Karambunai Integrated Resort City is a mixed development project comprising a water theme park, water spectacles, a fountain, a cable car, a mangrove research centre, a harbour cruise, and a spa village. This resort is part of the Tenth Malaysia Plan (10MP) and Economic Transformation Programme (ETP). It is the largest resort project in Sabah, covering over 3,339 acres and is expected to create between 20,000 and 50,000 jobs for locals.

In 2011, Cambodia's China Central Asia Group (CCAG) teamed up with Karambunai Corp to invest around RM310 million in the project.
