= Batu 11 Cheras MRT station =

MRT station in Balakong, Selangor, Malaysia

KG30 Batu 11 Cheras

General information
- Other names: Malay: باتو سبلس چيراس (Jawi); Chinese: 蕉赖十一哩; Tamil: பத்து 11 செராஸ்
- Location: Off Jalan Balakong, Batu 11 Cheras; 43200 Cheras; Selangor; Malaysia
- Coordinates: 3°12′23″N 101°34′49″E
- System: Rapid KL
- Owner: MRT Corp
- Operator: Rapid Rail
- Line: 9 Kajang Line
- Platforms: 2 side platforms
- Tracks: 2

Construction
- Structure type: Elevated
- Parking: Not available
- Cycle facilities: Not available
- Accessible: Yes

Other information
- Station code: KG30

History
- Opened: 17 July 2017; 9 years ago
- Former names: Balakong

Services
Preceding station		Following station
Bandar Tun Hussein Onn towards Kwasa Damansara	Kajang Line	Bukit Dukung towards Kajang
Location

The Batu 11 Cheras MRT station is a mass rapid transit (MRT) station serving the suburbs of Batu 11 Cheras, Balakong and Bandar Sungai Long in Cheras, Selangor, Malaysia. It serves as one of the stations on the MRT Kajang line. The station is located at the Balakong interchange of the Cheras–Kajang Expressway.

== Station Background ==
=== Station Layout ===
The station has a layout and design similar to that of most other elevated stations on the line (except the terminal stations), with the platform level on the topmost floor, consisting of two sheltered side platforms along a double tracked line and a single concourse housing ticketing facilities between the ground level and the platform level. All levels are linked by lifts, stairways and escalators.

L2	Platform Level	Side platform
L2	Platform Level	Platform 1:	9 Kajang Line towards KG35 Kajang (→)
L2	Platform Level	Platform 2:	9 Kajang Line towards KG04 Kwasa Damansara (←)
L2	Platform Level	Side platform
L1	Concourse	Faregates, Ticketing Machines, Customer Service Office, Station Control, Shops
G	Ground Level	Entrances A and B, Feeder bus hub, Taxi and e-hailing vehicle lay-by, Jalan Balakong, Jalan SS 2/2

=== Exits and entrances ===
The station has two entrances. The feeder buses operate from the station's feeder bus hub at Entrance A near Jalan Balakong. Entrance B is directly connected to the new B11 Parkland Residence.

Kajang Line station
Entrance	Location	Destination	Picture
A	Jalan SS 2/2	Feeder bus hub, Disabled-friendly	
B	Jalan Balakong	Taxi and private vehicle lay-by, Jalan Cheras Maju, connections to B11 Parkland service apartments	

== Bus Services ==
=== MRT Feeder Bus Services ===
With the opening of the MRT Kajang Line, feeder buses also began operating, linking the station to several housing areas and cities around Balakong and Cheras Jaya. The AEON Cheras Selatan is also accessible through the feeder bus service at this station. The feeder buses operate from the station's feeder bus hub at Entrance A of the station.

Route No.	Origin	Destination	Via
T416	KG30 Batu 11 Cheras	Taman Cheras Jaya	Jalan Balakong; Kajang Dispersal Link Expressway; AEON Cheras Selatan; Jalan CJ 3 Jalan CJ 15; Jalan CJ 16; Jalan CJ 8
T417	KG30 Batu 11 Cheras	Taman Impian Ehsan / Taman Karun Mas	Jalan Balakong; Kajang Dispersal Link Expressway; AEON Cheras Selatan; Persiaran Impian; Jalan Sinaran 2 Jalan Balakong Jaya 5
T569	PY33 Serdang Jaya (Entrance A)	KG30 Batu 11 Cheras	Taman Taming Jaya; Jalan Seri Kembangan; The Mines Mall; Balakong; Taman Bukit Belimbing; Kajang Dispersal Link Expressway; Taman Sungai Besi Indah

=== Other Bus Services ===
Rapid KL Route 450 (Hentian Kajang - Pasar Seni) also passes through this station (KL-bound only) via the bus stop near Dewan Orang Ramai Kampung Batu 11 Cheras (Cheras-Kajang Expressway). The bus stop is near the Batu 11 Cheras toll plaza.

Route No.	Operator	Origin	Destination	Via	Notes
450	Rapid KL	Hentian Kajang	Pasar Seni	Reko Sentral; Bandar Kajang; KG34 Stadium Kajang; KG33 Sungai Jernih; Sungai Sekamat; Simpang Balak; KG31 Bukit Dukung; Cheras–Kajang Expressway; Kampung Batu 11 Cheras / KG30 Batu 11 Cheras; Batu 9 Cheras / Taman Suntex; Cheras Sentral / KG26 Taman Connaught; FT 1 Cheras Highway (Jalan Cheras); KG24 Taman Midah; AG13 KG22 Maluri; Jalan Pasar; Jalan Pudu	For KL-bound only. The bus stop is within walking distance to the station
