= Cheras–Kajang Expressway =

Road in Malaysia

Expressway 7
- Cheras–Kajang Expressway; Lebuhraya Cheras–Kajang 蕉赖–加影大道

Route information
- Maintained by Grand Saga Sdn Bhd
- Length: 11.5 km (7.1 mi)
- Existed: 1998–present
- History: Completed in 1999

Major junctions
- North end: FT 1 Cheras Highway at Cheras, Kuala Lumpur/Selangor
- Sungai Besi–Ulu Klang Elevated Expressway; FT 3211 Jalan Balakong; FT 1 Jalan Cheras–Kajang; Kajang Dispersal Link Expressway
- South end: Kajang Bypass at Kajang, Selangor

Location
- Country: Malaysia
- Primary destinations: Kuala Lumpur, Petaling Jaya, Cheras, Kajang, Semenyih, Seremban

Highway system
- Highways in Malaysia; Expressways; Federal; State

The Cheras–Kajang Expressway is an 11.5-kilometre (7.1-mile) controlled-access highway in the Klang Valley region of Peninsular Malaysia. It runs between the suburb of Cheras at the Kuala Lumpur–Selangor border and the township of Kajang in Selangor.

== History ==
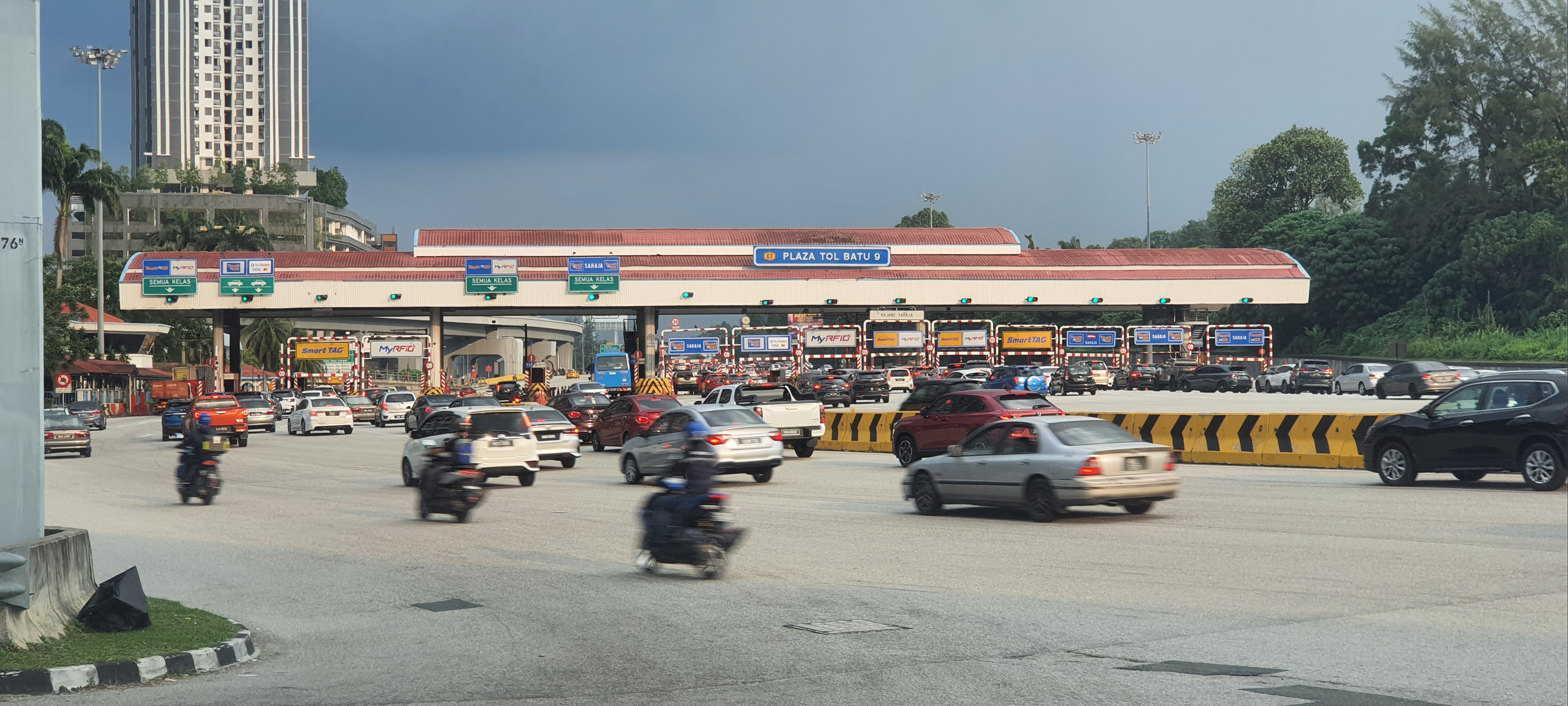
A general shot of the Batu 9 Toll Plaza on the Cheras-Kajang Expressway during an evening rush hour.

The expressway is part of a major expansion of Jalan Cheras, which consisted of a two-lane intercity road between Kajang and Cheras. Construction of the expressway commenced in late 1998 and, at a cost of RM275 million, was completed and began tolling on 15 January 1999. Having assumed a new name, the "Cheras–Kajang Expressway", and incorporated the mid-length of the original road into the expressway, the expressway consequently bisected Jalan Cheras into two at both ends of the original road: one at Kajang, and the other at Cheras, while remnants of the road's undeveloped routes between remain partially in use.

The Cheras–Kajang Expressway is among the first eight-lane dual carriageway in Malaysia, stretching from the Connaught Interchange in Cheras, Kuala Lumpur to Saujana Impian in Kajang. The expressway comprises one rest and service area and nine interchanges. The expressway has received substantial volumes of traffic to and from linked localities. Between 2003 and 2004 alone, traffic volume increased 4%, with an average of 187,000 vehicles per day utilising the expressway in the financial year of 2004.

The expressway used to have its own electronic toll collection system, known as the Saga Tag. On 1 July 2004, however, the Saga Tag was replaced by Touch 'n Go and Smart TAG systems.

Of the RM 275 million used to finance the expressway's construction, RM 210 million consisted of bonds issued by Grand Saga Sdn Bhd, the expressway's concession holder, and RM 59 million was a support loan from the government. Grand Saga was further provided compensation from the government for revisions of scheduled toll rate hikes. In 2003 and 2004, the government paid RM104.93 million in compensation, exclusive of waiving interest and repayment of the support loan. The government also extended the expressway's concession by two years to 18 September 2027 in 2002.

On 2 March 2012, the Kuala Lumpur bound Batu 9 toll plaza and Kajang bound Batu 11 toll plaza of the expressway were abolished by the government due to a strong petition led by Eddie Ng Tien Chee from the Democratic Action Party. This petition was signed by 100,000 residents of the area.

== Incidents ==
=== Bandar Mahkota Cheras exit ===
During the construction of Bandar Mahkota Cheras, an access road connecting the new township and the Bandar Tun Hussein Onn exit was built by the developer to provide access to Bandar Mahkota Cheras from Cheras–Kajang Expressway and vice versa. However, the link road was closed in January 2006 by Grand Saga under the direction of the Malaysian Highway Authority due to disputes between Grand Saga and the developer of Bandar Mahkota Cheras on compensations since the link road would allow motorists to bypass the Batu 11 toll plaza on the expressway. As a result, residents travelling to Kuala Lumpur are required to enter the expressway via Bandar Sungai Long or vice versa, while having to pay fares for both the Batu 9 and Batu 11 toll plazas.

Following Opposition control of Selangor in the 2008 election, local residents dismantled the barricades, temporarily allowing traffic to and from the township to directly enter and exit the expressway. In an early attempt, Grand Saga forcefully reclosed the road. However, On 27 June 2008, the barrier was torn down once again.

On 4 June 2008, the Malaysian Highway Authority and Grand Saga were ordered to install traffic lights on the junctions of Bandar Mahkota Cheras to ease the traffic flow of the residents. Today, the access road connecting Bandar Mahkota Cheras and Bandar Tun Hussein Onn Interchange is open.

== Toll systems ==
The Cheras–Kajang Expressway uses the opened toll systems.

=== Electronic Toll Collections (ETC) ===
As part of an initiative to facilitate faster transaction at the Batu 9 and Batu 11 Toll Plaza, all toll transactions at both toll plazas on the Cheras–Kajang Expressway has now been conducted electronically via Touch 'n Go cards or SmartTAGs starting 13 January 2016.

=== Toll rates ===
(Starting 15 October 2015)

Class	Types of vehicles	Rate (in Malaysian Ringgit (RM))	
Class	Types of vehicles	Batu 9	Batu 11
0	Motorcycles (Vehicles with two axles and two wheels)	Free	
1	Private Cars (Vehicles with two axles and three or four wheels (excluding taxi and bus))	1.30	
2	Vans and other small good vehicles (Vehicles with two axles and six wheels (excluding bus))	2.60	
3	Large Trucks (Vehicles with three or more axles (excluding bus))	2.60	
4	Taxis	0.70	
5	Buses	1.00	0.90

=== Toll name ===
Abbreviation	Name
BATU 9	Batu 9 Cheras
BATU 11	Batu 11 Cheras

== Interchange lists ==
Legend:

- I/C - Interchange, I/S - Intersection, RSA - Rest and service area, OBR - Overhead bridge restaurant, R/R - Restaurant and rest plaza, L/B - Layby, V/P - Vista point, TN - tunnel, T/P - Toll plaza, BR - Bridge
- C - Cloverleaf, S - Stack, T-A - Trumpet-A, T-B - Trumpet-B, DT - Directional-T/Y, SDT - Semi-Directional-T/Y, P-Y - Partial-Y, D - Diamond, P-C - Partial cloverleaf, D-D - Diverging diamond, D-R - Direct ramp

State/territory	District	Location	km	mi	Exit	Name	Destinations	Notes
Kuala Lumpur	Cheras	Taman Connaught	10.0	6.2	Through FT 1 Cheras Highway			
Kuala Lumpur	Cheras	Taman Connaught	10.0	6.2		Cheras Sentral (Plaza Phoenix); Taman Connaught MRT station	Cheras Sentral (Plaza Phoenix); Taman Connaught MRT station 9	Kuala Lumpur bound
Selangor	Hulu Langat	Cheras				Perhilitan	Perhilitan, Taman Cheras Hartamas	Southbound
Selangor	Hulu Langat	Cheras			701C	EWLE Exit	East–West Link Expressway – Taman Connaught, Bandar Tun Razak, Bangsar, Petaling Jaya, Shah Alam, Klang	Tunnel entry to E37
Selangor	Hulu Langat	Cheras			Petronas L/B (southbound)			
Selangor	Hulu Langat	Cheras			701A	SUKE I/C	Sungai Besi–Ulu Klang Elevated Expressway – Ampang, Pandan Indah, Bukit Teratai, Hulu Langat, Ulu Klang, Sungai Besi, KL Sports City, Shah Alam	Stack interchange
Selangor	Hulu Langat	Cheras				Royal Malaysian Police College	Royal Malaysian Police College	Northbound
Selangor	Hulu Langat	Cheras			701B	PGA I/C	Jalan Medan Masria – General Operations Force, Taman Cuepacs, Taman Cheras Permata, Taman Cheras Awana, Taman Segar Perdana, Cheras Hartamas	Diamond interchange
Selangor	Hulu Langat	Cheras			Batu 9 Toll Plaza (barrier system; southbound only)			
Selangor	Hulu Langat	Cheras				Taman Suntex MRT station	P&R Taman Suntex MRT station 9	
Selangor	Hulu Langat	Cheras			702	Hulu Langat I/C	FT 1 Jalan Lama Cheras – Pekan Batu 9 Cheras, Taman Suntex, Hulu Langat, Sungai Pangsoon, Sungai Congkak waterfall, Sungai Gabai waterfall, Sungai Tekali waterfall	
Selangor	Hulu Langat	Cheras				Sri Raya MRT station	P&R Sri Raya MRT station 9	
Selangor	Hulu Langat	Cheras			703	Telekom I/C	Jalan Kota Cheras – Kota Cheras, Taman Damai Jaya, Taman Sri Cheras, Taman Putri Jaya, Taman Legenda Mas, Taman Tun Perak, Taman Cheras Mas; FT 1 Jalan Lama Cheras – Pekan Batu 9 Cheras, Taman Suntex, Hulu Langat, Sungai Pangsoon, Sungai Congkak waterfall, Sungai Gabai waterfall, Sungai Tekali waterfall	Diamond interchange
Selangor	Hulu Langat	Bandar Tun Hussein Onn			704	Bandar Tun Hussein Onn I/C	Lebuh Utama Tun Hussein Onn – Bandar Tun Hussein Onn, Cheras Perdana; Persiaran Mahkota Cheras 1 – Bandar Mahkota Cheras	Diamond interchange
Selangor	Hulu Langat	Bandar Tun Hussein Onn				Bandar Tun Hussein Onn MRT station	P&R Bandar Tun Hussein Onn MRT station 9	
Selangor	Hulu Langat	Bandar Tun Hussein Onn			Batu 11 Toll Plaza (barrier system; northbound only)			
Selangor	Hulu Langat	Bandar Tun Hussein Onn			Sungai Cheras bridge			
Selangor	Hulu Langat	Bandar Tun Hussein Onn			705	Balakong I/C	FT 3211 Jalan Balakong – Batu 11 Cheras, Balakong, Mines Resort City, Seri Kembangan, Sungai Besi	Half-diamond interchange
Selangor	Hulu Langat	Bandar Tun Hussein Onn				Batu 11 Cheras MRT station	Batu 11 Cheras MRT station 9	
Selangor	Hulu Langat	Bandar Tun Hussein Onn			Langat River bridge			
Selangor	Hulu Langat	Bandar Tun Hussein Onn			706	Bandar Sungai Long I/C	Jalan Sungai Long – Bandar Sungai Long, Bandar Mahkota Cheras; Kajang Dispersal Link Expressway – Semenyih, Seremban	Half-diamond interchange
Selangor	Hulu Langat	Bukit Dukung			Bukit Dukung RSA, BH Petrol (northbound)			
Selangor	Hulu Langat	Bukit Dukung			707	Bukit Dukung I/C	FT 1 Jalan Cheras–Kajang – Kampung Bukit Dukung	Interchange
Selangor	Hulu Langat	Bukit Dukung			Shell and Petronas L/B (southbound); P&R Bukit Dukung MRT station 9			
Selangor	Hulu Langat	Sungai Balak			707A	Sungai Balak I/C	Kajang Dispersal Link Expressway (Sungai Balak Link) – Sungai Chua, Putrajaya, Cyberjaya, Puchong, Kuala Lumpur International Airport (KLIA), Shah Alam	Trumpet interchange
Selangor	Hulu Langat	Sungai Balak			Petronas and Petron L/B (southbound)			
Selangor	Hulu Langat	Kajang				Kajang MRT Depot		
Selangor	Hulu Langat	Kajang			708	Saujana Impian I/C	FT 1 Jalan Cheras–Kajang – Kampung Bukit Dukung, Kampung Sekamat, Kajang town centre, Bangi; P&R Sungai Jernih MRT station 9	Diamond interchange
Selangor	Hulu Langat	Kajang			Through to Kajang Bypass			
1.000 mi = 1.609 km; 1.000 km = 0.621 mi: Concurrency terminus; Electronic toll collection; Incomplete access; Route transition
