= Malaysia Federal Route 3211 =

Road in Malaysia

Federal Route 3211
- Jalan Balakong

Route information
- Maintained by Malaysian Public Works Department
- Length: 8 km (5.0 mi)

Major junctions
- West end: Mines; Sungai Besi Expressway
- Sungai Besi Expressway; Cheras–Kajang Expressway / FT 1
- East end: Balakong interchange Cheras–Kajang Expressway / FT 1

Location
- Country: Malaysia
- Primary destinations: Mines Resort City, Sungai Besi, Seri Kembangan, Cheras, Balakong

Highway system
- Highways in Malaysia; Expressways; Federal; State

Federal Route 3211, Jalan Balakong (formerly Selangor State Route B51), is an industrial federal road in Selangor, Malaysia.

At most sections, the Federal Route 3211 was built under the JKR R5 road standard, allowing maximum speed limit of up to 90 km/h (56 mph).

There is one overlap: E18 Kajang Dispersal Link Expressway – Mines–Balakong.

== Junction lists ==
The entire route is located in Hulu Langat District, Selangor.

Legend:

- I/C - Interchange, I/S - Intersection, RSA - Rest and service area, OBR - Overhead bridge restaurant, R/R - Restaurant and rest plaza, L/B - Layby, V/P - Vista point, TN - tunnel, T/P - Toll plaza, BR - Bridge
- C - Cloverleaf, S - Stack, T-A - Trumpet-A, T-B - Trumpet-B, DT - Directional-T/Y, SDT - Semi-Directional-T/Y, P-Y - Partial-Y, D - Diamond, P-C - Partial cloverleaf, D-D - Diverging diamond, D-R - Direct ramp

Location	km	mi	Name	Destinations	Notes
Balakong			Mines–Balakong	see also Kajang Dispersal Link Expressway	
Balakong			Cheras Raya Business Centre		
Balakong			Balakong	Jalan Besar – Batu 11 Cheras, Taman Cheras Perdana, Bandar Tun Hussein Onn	T-junctions
Balakong			Cheras River bridge		
Balakong			Balakong-CKE	Cheras–Kajang Expressway / FT 1 – Kuala Lumpur, Cheras, Hulu Langat, Kajang, Semenyih, Seremban	Half diamond interchange
1.000 mi = 1.609 km; 1.000 km = 0.621 mi: Concurrency terminus
