= Bandar Tun Hussein Onn MRT station =

MRT station in Cheras, Selangor, Malaysia

KG29 Bandar Tun Hussein Onn
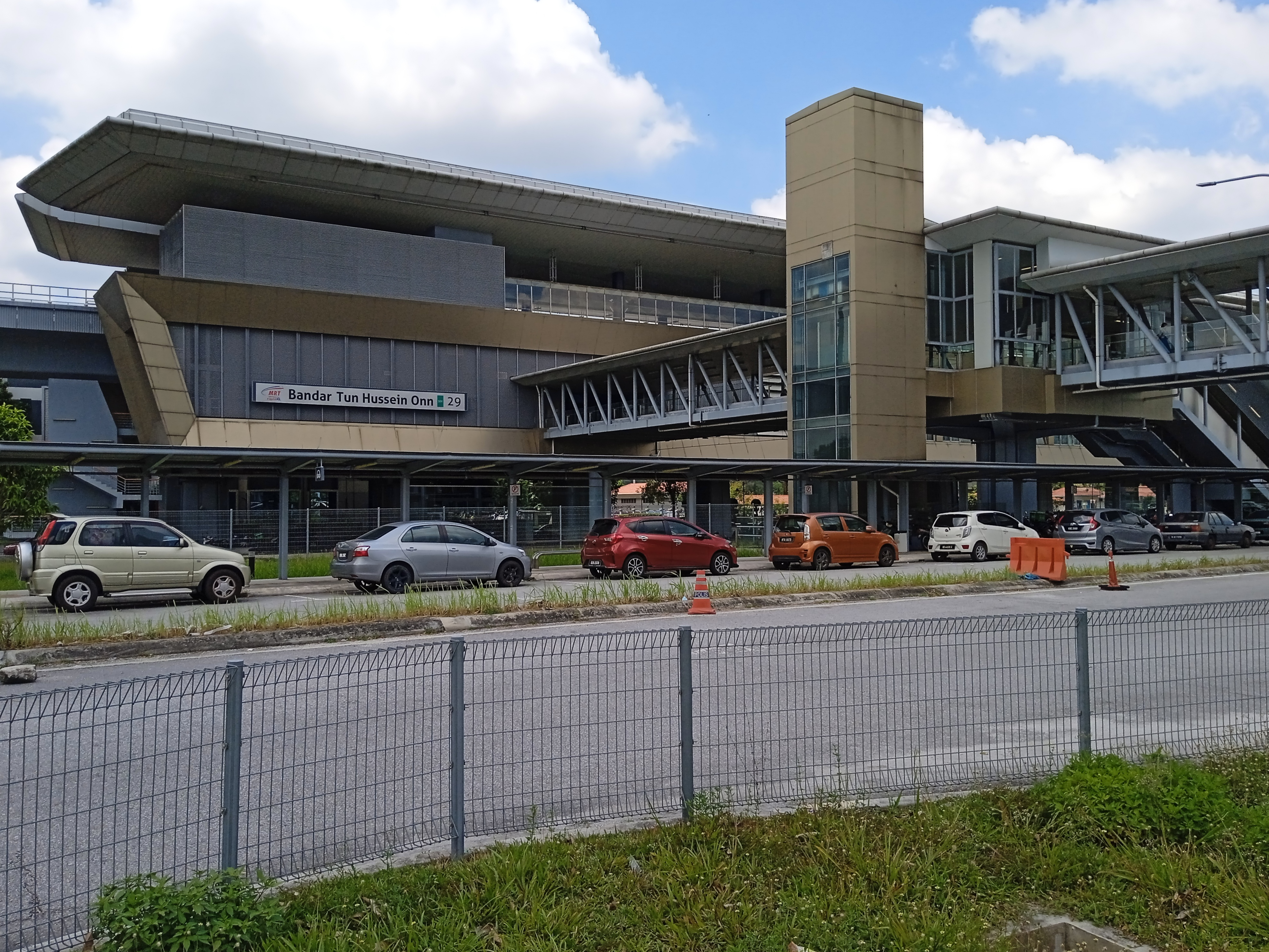

General information
- Other names: Malay: باندر تون حسين عون (Jawi); Chinese: 敦胡先翁镇; Tamil: பண்டார் துன் உசேன் ஓன்
- Location: Off Cheras-Kajang Expressway and Lebuh Utama Tun Hussein Onn, Bandar Tun Hussein Onn, 43200 Cheras; Selangor; Malaysia
- Coordinates: 3°12′23″N 101°34′49″E
- System: Rapid KL
- Owner: MRT Corp
- Operator: Rapid Rail
- Line: 9 Kajang Line
- Platforms: 2 side platforms
- Tracks: 2

Construction
- Structure type: Elevated
- Parking: Available with payment. 305 total parking bays.
- Cycle facilities: Not available.
- Accessible: Yes

Other information
- Station code: KG29

History
- Opened: 17 July 2017; 9 years ago

Services
Preceding station		Following station
Sri Raya towards Kwasa Damansara	Kajang Line	Batu 11 Cheras towards Kajang
Location

The Bandar Tun Hussein Onn MRT station is a mass rapid transit (MRT) station in Bandar Tun Hussein Onn, located in Cheras, Selangor, Malaysia. It serves as one of the stations on the MRT Kajang line. It was opened on 17 July 2017, together with the Phase 2 opening of the MRT line, along the Muzium Negara-Kajang stretch.

The station is located at the Bandar Tun Hussein Onn interchange of the Cheras–Kajang Expressway.

This MRT station features a car park with 305 parking bays; TnG payment is accepted.

The station takes its name from the housing development of Bandar Tun Hussein Onn.

== Station Background ==
=== Station Layout ===
The station has a layout and design similar to that of most other elevated stations on the line (except the terminal stations), with the platform level on the topmost floor, consisting of two sheltered side platforms along a double tracked line and a single concourse housing ticketing facilities between the ground level and the platform level. All levels are linked by lifts, stairways and escalators.

L2	Platform Level	Side platform
L2	Platform Level	Platform 1:	9 Kajang Line towards KG35 Kajang (→)
L2	Platform Level	Platform 2:	9 Kajang Line towards KG04 Kwasa Damansara (←)
L2	Platform Level	Side platform
L1	Concourse	Facilities (Toilets and Surau), Faregates, Ticketing Machines, Customer Service Office, Station Control, Shops
G	Ground Level	Entrances A and B, Feeder bus hub, Taxi and e-hailing vehicle lay-by, Park & Ride

=== Exits and entrances ===
The station has two entrances. The feeder buses operate from the station's feeder bus hub at Entrance B. Entrance B also provides access to the Park & Ride facility.

Kajang Line station
Entrance	Location	Destination	Picture
A	Cheras Perdana	Taxi and private vehicle lay-by, Cheras Perdana, Bandar Tun Hussein Onn	
B	MRT Park & Ride	Park & Ride Facility, Feeder bus hub	

== Bus Services ==
=== MRT Feeder Bus Services ===
With the opening of the MRT Kajang Line, feeder buses also began operating, linking the station with several housing areas and cities around the Cheras area. The feeder buses operate from the station's feeder bus hub at Entrance B of the station.

Route No.	Origin	Destination	Via
T415	KG29 Bandar Tun Hussein Onn	Bandar Makhota Cheras	Persiaran Makhota Cheras 1 Jalan Temenggung; Jalan Permaisuri; BMC Mall

=== Other Bus Services ===
The MRT station also is also served by served by some other bus services.

Route No.	Operator	Origin	Destination	Via
KJ03	Rapid KL	Taman Tun Perak	KG29 Bandar Tun Hussein Onn	Persiaran Tun Perak; AEON BiG Bandar Tun Hussein Onn; Jalan Suadamai; AEON Cheras Selatan; Jalan Cheras Perdana

== See also ==
- Prasarana Malaysia
- Public transport in Kuala Lumpur
- Klang Valley Integrated Transit System
- List of rail transit stations in Klang Valley

=== Klang Valley Mass Rapid Transit ===
- MRT Corp
  - Klang Valley Mass Rapid Transit Project
    - 9 Kajang Line
    - 12 Putrajaya Line
    - 13 Circle Line
