= Taman Suntex MRT station =

MRT station in Cheras, Selangor, Malaysia

KG27 Taman Suntex
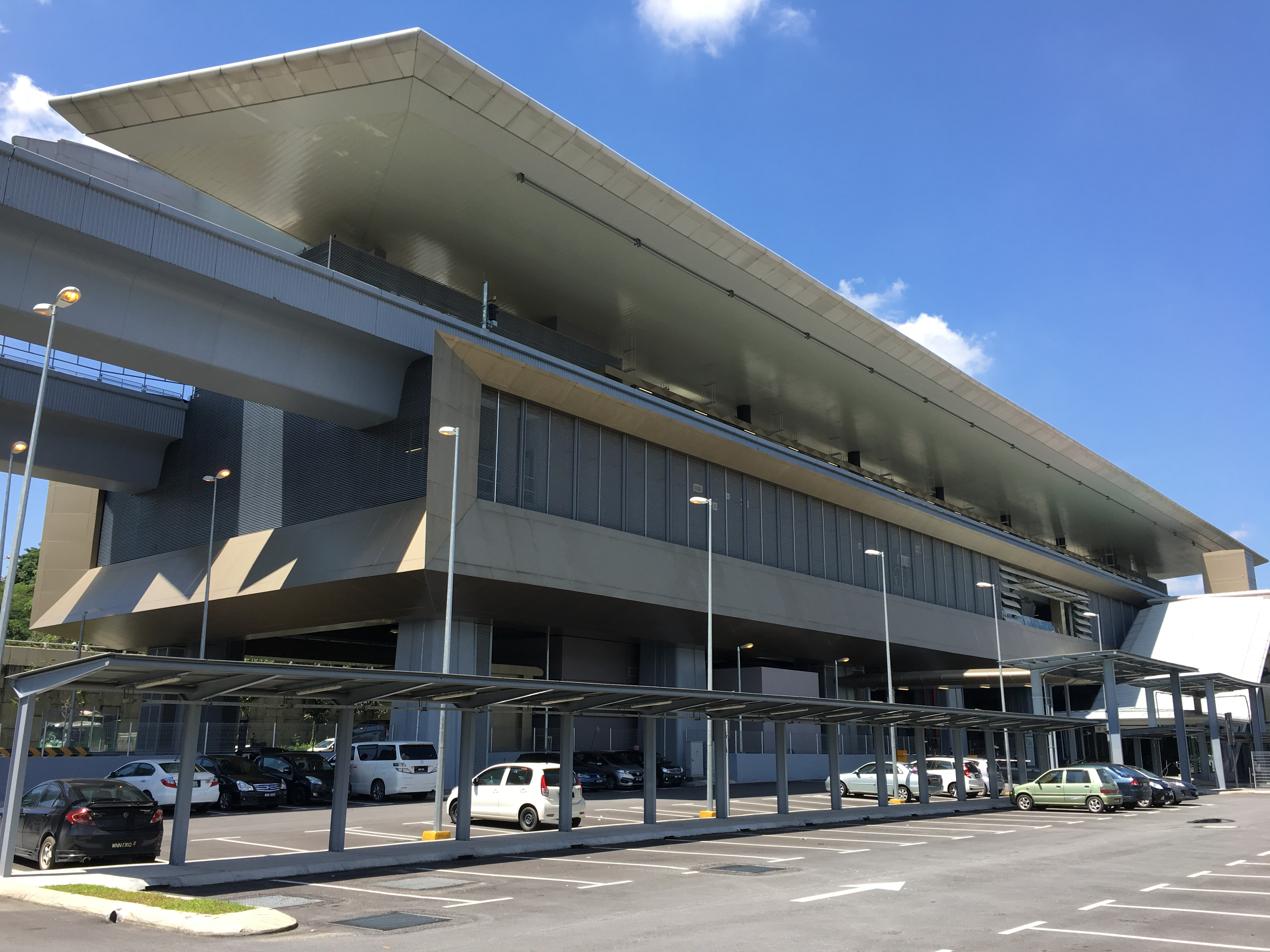

General information
- Other names: Malay: تامن سانتيك`س (Jawi); Chinese: 山力花园; Tamil: தாமான் சன்டெக்ஸ்
- Location: Jalan Kinabalu, Taman Suntex, 43200 Cheras; Selangor; Malaysia
- Coordinates: 3°04′18″N 101°45′49″E
- System: Rapid KL
- Owner: MRT Corp
- Line: 9 Kajang Line
- Platforms: 1 island platform
- Tracks: 2

Construction
- Structure type: Elevated
- Parking: Available with payment. 628 parking bays, 62 motorcycle bays.
- Accessible: Yes

Other information
- Station code: KG27

History
- Opened: 17 July 2017; 9 years ago

Services
| Preceding station | | Following station |
|---|---|---|
| Taman Connaught towards Kwasa Damansara | Kajang Line | Sri Raya towards Kajang |
Location

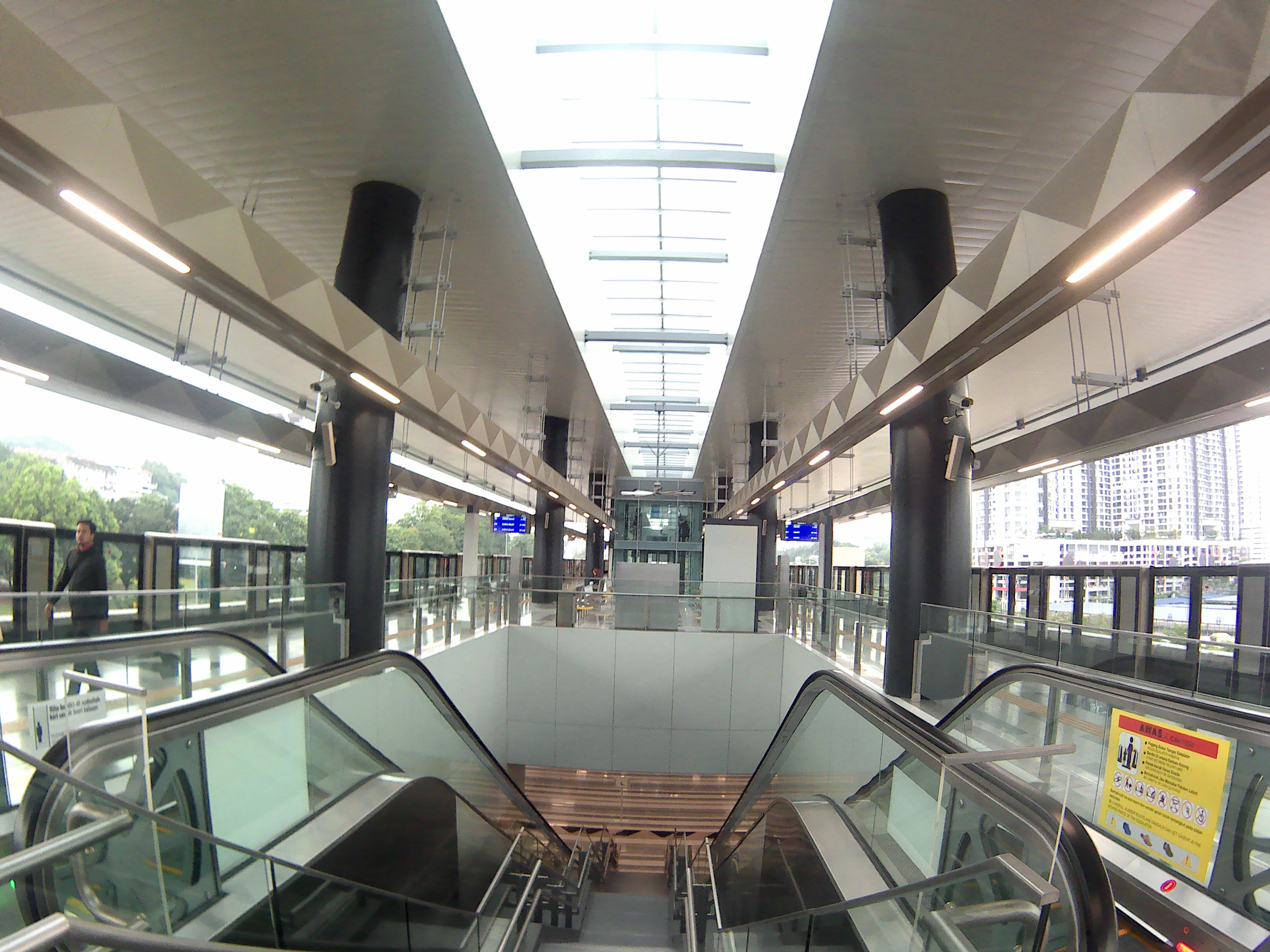

The Taman Suntex MRT station is a mass rapid transit (MRT) station that serves the suburb of Taman Suntex in Cheras, Selangor, Malaysia. It serves as one of the stations on the MRT Kajang Line. The station is located beside the Hulu Langat interchange and Batu 9 Toll Plaza (Kajang-bound) of the Cheras–Kajang Expressway, and is situated in Taman Suntex.

== Station Background ==
=== Station Layout ===
The station adopts the standard elevated station design of the MRT Kajang Line with two levels. However, unlike most of the elevated stations, the station has an island platform above the concourse level. Other stations which have a similar layout are the Phileo Damansara and Kajang stations.

| L2 | MRT platform level | Platform 1: | 9 Kajang Line towards KG35 Kajang (→) |
| L2 | MRT platform level | Island platform |
| L2 | MRT platform level | Platform 2: | 9 Kajang Line towards KG04 Kwasa Damansara (←) |
| L1 | Concourse | Faregates, Ticketing Machines, Customer Service Office, Station Control, Shops |
| G | Ground Level | Entrance A, Feeder Bus Terminal, Taxi lay-by, Private and E-hailing lay-by, MRT Park & Ride, Jalan Kinabalu, Jalan Taman Suntex |

=== Exits and entrances ===
The station has only one entrance - Entrance A. The feeder buses operate from the station's feeder bus hub at Entrance A within the station area.

Kajang Line station
| Entrance | Location | Destination | Picture |
| A | Jalan Kinabalu | Feeder bus hub, Taxi and e-hailing lay-by, Jalan Taman Suntex | |

== Bus Services ==
=== Feeder bus services ===
With the opening of the MRT Kajang Line, feeder buses also began operating, linking the station with several housing areas and villages around the Taman Suntex area. The feeder buses operate from the station's feeder bus hub, at Entrance A.

| Route No. | Origin | Destination | Via |
|---|---|---|---|
| T413 | KG27 Taman Suntex | Taman Kemacahaya / Taman Sri Mujur | Jalan Taman Suntex / Batu 9 Cheras; Jalan Hulu Langat; Jalan Kemacahaya; Jalan Teratai; Jalan Alam Jaya; Jalan Sri Mujur 1 |

=== Other Bus Services ===
The MRT station is also served by some other bus services.

The bus stop is located near the Jalan Taman Suntex-Jalan Kijang traffic light junction. It requires an approximately 500-metre walk to reach the station from the bus stop.

| Route No. | Operator | Origin | Destination | Via | Notes |
|---|---|---|---|---|---|
| 450 | Rapid KL | Hentian Kajang | Hub Lebuh Pudu | Reko Sentral; Bandar Kajang; KG34 Stadium Kajang; KG33 Sungai Jernih; Sungai Sekamat; Simpang Balak; KG31 Bukit Dukung; Cheras–Kajang Expressway; Jalan Hulu Langat; Batu 9 Cheras / Taman Suntex; KG27 Taman Suntex; Cheras Sentral / KG26 Taman Connaught; FT 1 Cheras Highway (Jalan Cheras); KG24 Taman Midah; AG13 KG22 Maluri; Jalan Pasar; Jalan Pudu | For both Kuala Lumpur-bound and Kajang-bound buses. |
| T406 | Rapid KL | Taman Kota Cheras 1 (Hub TM Batu 10 Cheras) | Pangsun, Hulu Langat / Sungai Lui | Pangsun / Sungai Lui Bound; Jalan Kota Cheras / KG28 Sri Raya; Cheras–Kajang Expressway; Batu 9 Cheras / Taman Suntex; KG27 Taman Suntex; Jalan Hulu Langat; Bukit Raya; Sungai Serai; Kampung Nanding; Batu 14 Langat; Dusun Tua; Batu 18 Langat Pangsun-bound; Lubuk Kelubi; Kuala Pangsun Sungai Lui-bound; Batu 20 Hulu Langat; Sungai Lui; Kampung Ulu Lui | The buses will operate separately for both Pangsun-bound and Sungai Lui-bound. The route will separate at the Batu 18 Langat area. The following are the schedules of the bus route: Pangsun to Batu 10 Cheras First bus: 0530h, Last bus: 2345h (Frequency 30-70 minutes) Sungai Lui to Batu 10 Cheras First bus: 0630h, Last bus: 2035h (Frequency 70-75 minutes) Batu 10 Cheras to Pangsun First bus: 0710h, Last bus: 2335h (Frequency 60-70 minutes) Batu 10 Cheras to Sungai Lui First bus: 0635h, Last bus: 1925h (Frequency 70 minutes) |

== See also ==
- MRT Kajang Line
