= Kajang Line =

Railway line in the Klang Valley, Malaysia

MRT Kajang Line

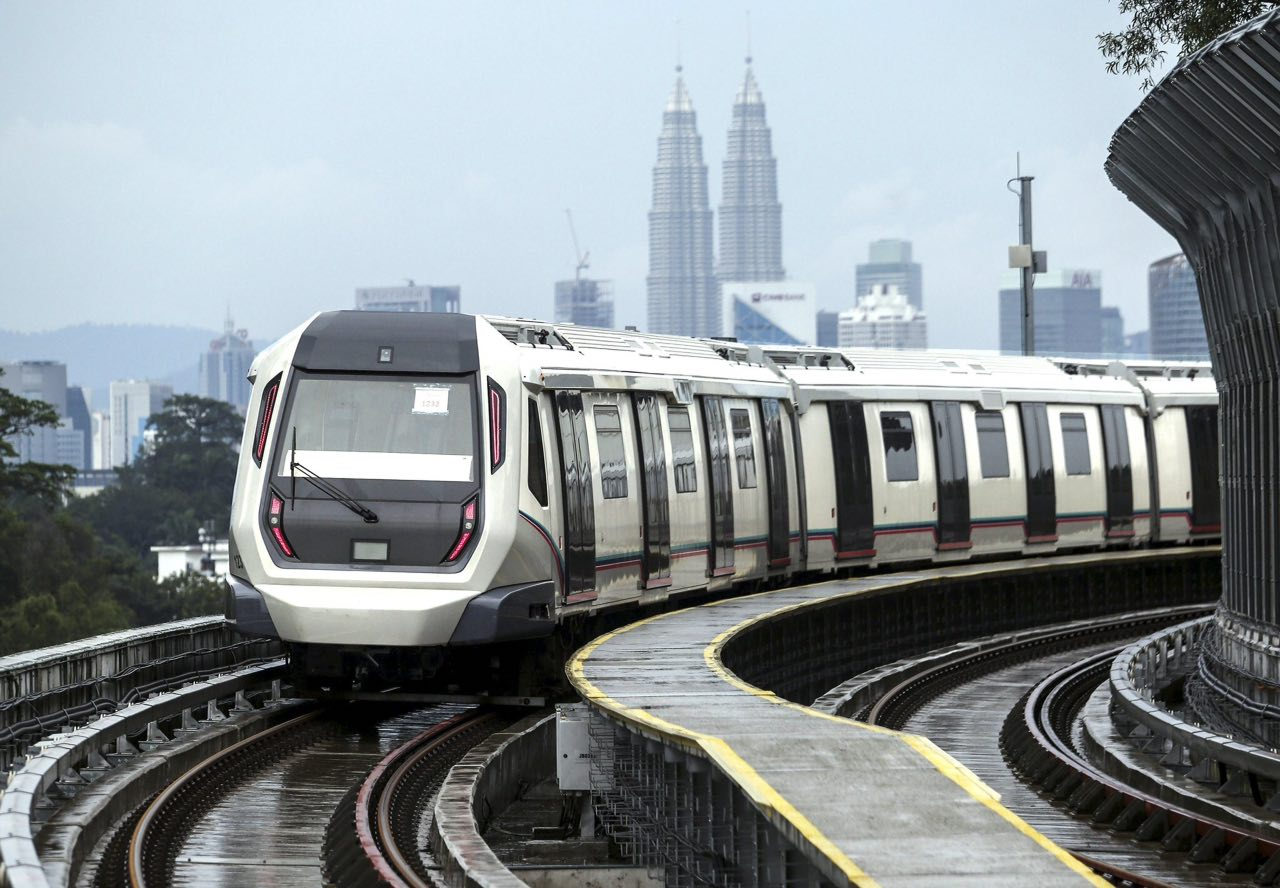
- A Siemens Inspiro EMU stock designed by BMW Group Designworks leaving Semantan station

Overview
- Other name(s): MRT1, SBK, KGL
- Native name: MRT Laluan Kajang
- Status: Fully operational
- Owner: MRT Corp
- Line number: 9 (green)
- Locale: Klang Valley
- Termini: KG04 Kwasa Damansara; KG35 Kajang
- Stations: 29 & 3 reserved
- Website: myrapid.com.my

Service
- Type: Rapid transit
- System: Rapid KL; Klang Valley Integrated Transit System
- Services: Kwasa Damansara–Kajang
- Operator: Rapid Rail
- Depot(s): Sungai Buloh Depot and Kajang Depot
- Rolling stock: Siemens Inspiro; 58 four-car trainsets Width: 3.1 m (10 ft) - wide profile Length: 90.18 m (295.9 ft)
- Daily ridership: 294,709 (Q2 2026); 396,141 (2025; Highest)
- Ridership: 92.74 million (2025) (▲9.7%)

History
- Opened: Phase 1: 16 December 2016; 9 years ago Sungai Buloh (Note: The terminus station is currently Kwasa Damansara since 16 June 2022.) – Semantan; Phase 2: 17 July 2017; 9 years ago Muzium Negara – Kajang
- Completed: 17 July 2017; 9 years ago

Technical
- Line length: 47 km (29 mi); Elevated: 37.5 km (23.3 mi); Underground: 9.5 km (5.9 mi)
- Track gauge: 1,435 mm (4 ft 8 1/2 in) standard gauge
- Electrification: 750 V DC third rail
- Conduction system: Automated and driverless
- Operating speed: 100 km/h (62 mph) [Underground] 60 km/h (37 mi/hr) [Elevated]
- Signalling: CBTC

The MRT Kajang Line, previously known as the MRT Sungai Buloh–Kajang Line, is a Mass Rapid Transit (MRT) line servicing the Klang Valley, Malaysia. It is the second fully automated and driverless rail system in the Klang Valley region after the Kelana Jaya Line. Owned by MRT Corp and operated as part of the Rapid KL system by Rapid Rail, it forms part of the Klang Valley Integrated Transit System. The line is numbered 9 and coloured green on official transit maps.

It is one of three planned MRT rail lines under the Klang Valley Mass Rapid Transit Project by MRT Corp. Phase 1 operations between Sungai Buloh and Semantan commenced service on 16 December 2016. Phase 2 operations between Muzium Negara and Kajang was opened on 17 July 2017, as a free shuttle service, by former Malaysian Prime Minister, Najib Razak in a ceremony at the Tun Razak Exchange station. Full revenue service between Sungai Buloh and Kajang began the following day.

== History ==
=== Initial LRT proposal ===
In August 2006, a Kota Damansara–Cheras light rapid transit (LRT) line proposal was made known to the public by the then Deputy Prime Minister Najib Razak under a RM10 billion government allocation for the improvement and expansion of the public transportation network in the Klang Valley. The line was intended to alleviate traffic congestion in the Klang Valley by encouraging more commuters to opt for public transport. (Note: As of 2006, the percentage of public transport passengers was only 11%.) It is also aimed to reduce overcrowding on the KL Monorail and to provide an alternative mode of transport during a period of rising fuel prices.

The line, initially reported to be approximately 30 km (19 mi) in length, was planned to be built concurrently with the extension of the Kelana Jaya Line and the Sri Petaling Line to Subang Jaya and Puchong respectively, with both of those lines converging at Putra Heights. Of the RM10 billion, an estimated RM7 billion would go toward the expansion of the Kelana Jaya and Sri Petaling Lines.

Syarikat Prasarana Nasional Berhad (SPNB) was assigned for the endeavour. The Kota Damansara–Cheras line was intended to be served by 140 coaches, with the track gauge as easily integrated with existing LRT lines as possible.

The Ministry of Transport approved the alignment of the new line in July 2007 which would then be tabled to the Cabinet for approval. The Finance Ministry's Parliamentary Secretary announced that the line from Kota Damansara to Cheras and Balakong would be completed by 2012. The line would be 40 km (25 mi) long, serving densely populated areas in Damansara and Cheras via "The Golden Triangle" of Kuala Lumpur city. (Note: The Golden Triangle is Malaysia's leading business hub, spanning areas to the north of Jalan Pudu and Jalan Changkat Thambi Dollah, west of Jalan Tun Razak and south of Jalan Ampang.) The alignment was to be from Persiaran Surian to the Balakong Interchange on the Cheras–Kajang Expressway (CKE), passing through the Damansara-Puchong Expressway (LDP), Sprint Highway, the city, Jalan Tun Razak and Jalan Cheras, stopping at around 30 stations. Ownership of the line belonged to SPNB, and would be operated by Rapid Rail. The estimated construction cost is between RM4 billion and RM5 billion.

In September 2008, executive director of SPNB said that a 5.9 km (3.7 mi) section of the line in central Kuala Lumpur will be underground, serving 5 stations. However, the locations of underground stations were not announced. It was during this time that the line was said to be 42 km (26 mi) with 32 stations in total, which would serve areas of Bandar Utama, Bangsar, KL Sentral, Bukit Bintang, Bandar Tasik Selatan and Cheras. The line was being considered for conversion to a Mass Rapid Transit (MRT) system after taking into consideration the catchment area serving a population of 878,000. It was also reported that the detailed design stage for the line would commence in the second quarter of 2009 and the opening date was expected to be in 2014. (Note: By May 2009, tenders for the LRT Kelana Jaya Line and LRT Ampang Line extension projects would be called as the designs have been finalised but there was no news on the implementation of the Kota Damansara-Cheras Line.)

=== New alignment and conversion to MRT ===
On 14 September 2009, SPNB managing director Idrose Mohamed was reported as saying that the new line could end up longer than the earlier announced alignment although he did not offer any further details. A public display of the alignment was launched a day after the announcement. SPNB was reported to have raised the necessary funds from Islamic investments of RM2 billion and hopes to gain approval from the Ministry of Transport to call out for tenders. In April 2010, a proposal to extend the line by 16 km (9.9 mi) was being studied by the government. (Note: The main section of the line is to be extended by 12km while a branch line will extend the line by 4km.) The proposal included extensions from Kota Damansara to Sungai Buloh (additional 3 km (1.9 mi)) and from Cheras to Kajang (additional 9 km (5.6 mi)). This was intended to provide convenient interchanges to the existing Keretapi Tanah Melayu (KTM) stations at Sungai Buloh and Kajang, as well as to support the upcoming development of land 3,000-acres (1,200 ha) of land in Sungai Buloh. An additional branch line from Damansara Utama to Kelana Jaya (additional 4 km (2.5 mi)) aimed to relieve congestion on the LDP Highway was also being studied, bringing the total length of the line to 59 km (37 mi).

Unofficial statements in 2009 claimed that the proposed line was changed to an MRT line. In June 2010, during the tabling of the 10th Malaysia Plan, Prime Minister Najib Razak announced that the government was now considering a RM36 billion Klang Valley Mass Rapid Transit (MRT) proposal from Gamuda Berhad and MMC Corporation Berhad, which would be the largest national infrastructure project. The proposal includes 3 lines, including one which is similar to the Kota Damansara—Cheras proposal. (Note: The second line is expected to be connecting Sungai Buloh, Kepong, the city and Serdang while the third line is an orbital route.) The MRT lines were to be mostly underground with stations 500 m (1,600 ft) to 1 km (3,300 ft) apart in areas with high demand. The concept was envisioned to be inspired by Singapore's Mass Rapid Transit (MRT) system. (Note: Developers in KL city had been asked to redesign their upcoming mixed-development projects to integrate with MRT stations.) The project, aimed to improve public transport in the Klang Valley, was approved by the Malaysian cabinet on 16 December 2010 and construction of the first line from Sungai Buloh to Kajang would begin in July 2011 with a duration of five to six years. Gross national income from these future lines was estimated to be between RM3 bil and RM12 bil. The government had appointed MMC-Gamuda JV Sdn Bhd as Project Delivery Partner where it would play the role project manager, supervised by the Land Public Transport Commission (SPAD). The whole project would be divided into nine parcels to be done on open tender basis. 10 km (6.2 mi) of the line would be underground and the remaining 50 km (31 mi) above ground with 35 new stations. MMC-Gamuda would be barred from bidding for any tender except for tunnelling works (the most expensive portion). Ownership of the lines would be given to SPNB.

To seek for further consultation from the public, SPAD held a 3-month public display of the alignment of the MRT Kajang Line. On 8 July 2011, Najib officially launched the project. The final alignment was adjusted following the public display, having a length of 51 km (32 mi) with 31 stations where 16 have Park and Ride facilities. Construction was said to be completed in December 2016 and the line would start operations a month after. On 17 August 2011, the government announced that Mass Rapid Transit Corporation Sdn Bhd (MRT Corp), a new company under the finance ministry had been formed to take control of the project from Prasarana Malaysia. MRT Corp would be the asset owner of the project and officially take over the project from Prasarana Malaysia on 1 September 2011. After the MRT project was formally launched on 8 July 2011, the following amendments were made to the original proposed alignment following the public display exercise between March and May 2011:

- 31 stations instead of 35 stations will be built and provisions have been made for 3 more stations
  - Future station 1 (Teknologi) located between Kwasa Sentral and Kota Damansara stations
  - Future station 2 (Bukit Kiara Selatan) located between Phileo Damansara and Pusat Bandar Damansara stations which will serve as an elevated interchange station with the future MRT Circle Line
  - Construction of Taman Mesra station was shelved.
  - The proposed Section 17 station was dropped
- The location of the proposed Taman Tun Dr Ismail was moved around 300 m (980 ft) southwards to the former Caltex petrol stations. This was due to complaints from Taman Tun Dr Ismail and Damansara Kim residents.
- Bukit Bintang East and West stations were combined into one, moved and integrated with KL Monorail station. The station was named Bukit Bintang Central station and subsequently Bukit Bintang station.
- Park-and-ride facilities has been increased to 16 from 13 previously.
- Adjustments to the alignment:
  - Shifting alignment into the former Rubber Research Institute of Malaysia land in Sungai Buloh to cater for future development
  - Adjusting the alignment adjacent to Kajang to avoid going through the town centre and through Kajang Stadium.

=== Contract allocation ===
On 21 October 2011, MRT Corp shortlisted 5 companies to construct the underground parts of the line including MMC Gamuda Joint Venture and Sinohydro Group. On 26 January 2012, MRT Corp announced the award of the first two civil works contracts for the construction of the MRT Kajang Line. IJM Construction Sdn Bhd was appointed the contractor for Package V5 at a tender price of RM974 million, while Ahmad Zaki Sdn Bhd was appointed the contractor for Package V6 at a tender price of RM764 million. Package V5 is from the Maluri portal to Plaza Phoenix (now Taman Connaught) station while Package V6 covers the section between Plaza Phoenix and Bandar Tun Hussein Onn stations. MRT Corp announced the pre-qualification of 28 companies to bid for six System Works Packages for the MRT line on 8 March 2012. Subsequently, in September 2012, another 31 companies were pre-qualified to bid for the remaining five System Works Packages.

=== Construction ===
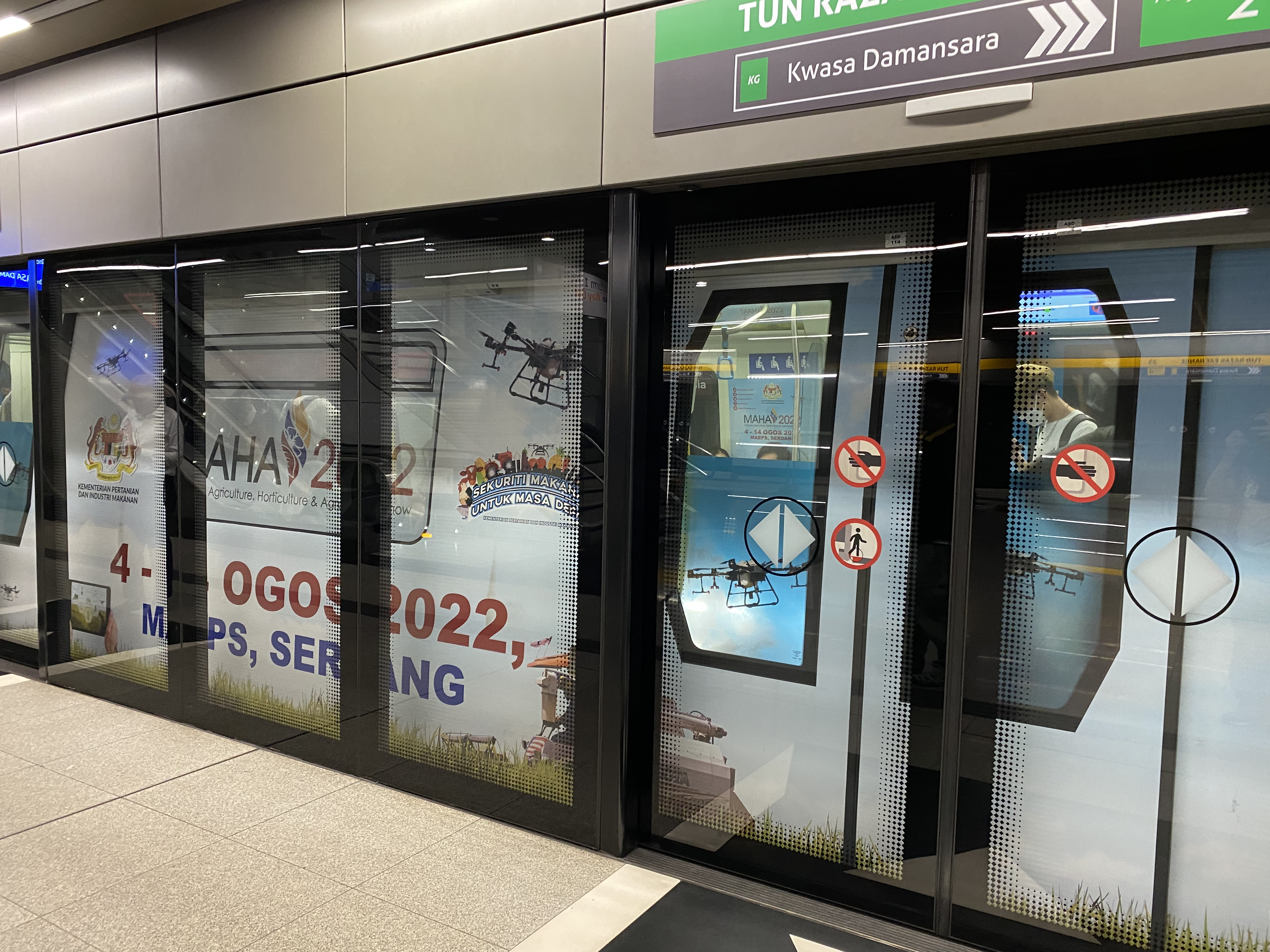
All stations are fitted with Platform Screen Doors (PSD), as seen here at Tun Razak Exchange.

All stations are to be equipped with platform screen doors, where this contract was awarded to the Singaporean company Singapore Technology Electronics Ltd. 33kV Main Switching Substations were to be constructed at 4 stations, namely Taman Industri Sungai Buloh (now known as Kwasa Sentral), Section 16 (now known as Phileo Damansara), Taman Cuepacs (now known as Sri Raya) and Kajang stations. The other 3 substations are added at the Cochrane launch shaft, Sungai Buloh depot and Semantan portal. Two more 132/33kV Transmission Main Intakes are constructed at Cochrane Launch shaft and Semantan portal. Tenaga Nasional Berhad (TNB) agreed to supply 116.5MW of power on the Kajang Line which costs RM173.1 million.

On 1 November 2011, the 70's Klang bus stand ceased operations and was demolished to make way for the underground platforms and new entrances of Pasar Seni. When construction of the station is completed, a new bus hub was to be constructed. On 1 August 2012, MRT Corp announced that the project was in active construction phase. MRT Corp said that the project cost would not exceed the limit of RM23 billion. The first section between Sungai Buloh and Semantan was expected to open in December 2016, with the entire line opening in July 2017. The total cost of the line was confirmed to be RM21 billion in December 2016.

On 30 May 2013, tunnel excavation works for the Kajang Line began with the world's first Variable Density Tunnel Boring Machine (VDTBM). This TBM was jointly designed by MMC Gamuda KVMRT Tunnelling and Herrenknecht AG, a German company. Commencement of tunnelling works was launched by former Malaysian Prime Minister Najib Razak at the Cochrane Launch Shaft, which would later become the Cochrane station. The shaft is 30 m (98 ft) deep and this TBM was to dig a distance of 1.2 km (0.75 mi) towards Pasar Rakyat (now Tun Razak Exchange) station. 10 TBMs were used to construct the 9.5 km (5.9 mi) tunnelled section of the line, where 6 are Variable Density and 4 are Earth Pressure Balance TBMs. The tunnels are to have a diameter of 6 m (20 ft), where the first breakthrough of the TBM excavations occurred on 25 December 2013.

=== Opening ===
On 16 December 2016, Phase 1 of the line which spans 21 km from Sungai Buloh to Semantan, consisting of 12 stations serviced by 24 trains, was opened. The fare of this part of the line and its feeder bus routes was free of charge until 16 January 2017.

On 17 July 2017, Phase Two of the line from Semantan to Kajang began operations.

The line is operated by a subsidiary of Prasarana Malaysia, Rapid Rail.

== Overview ==
=== Route ===
Route of Kajang Line

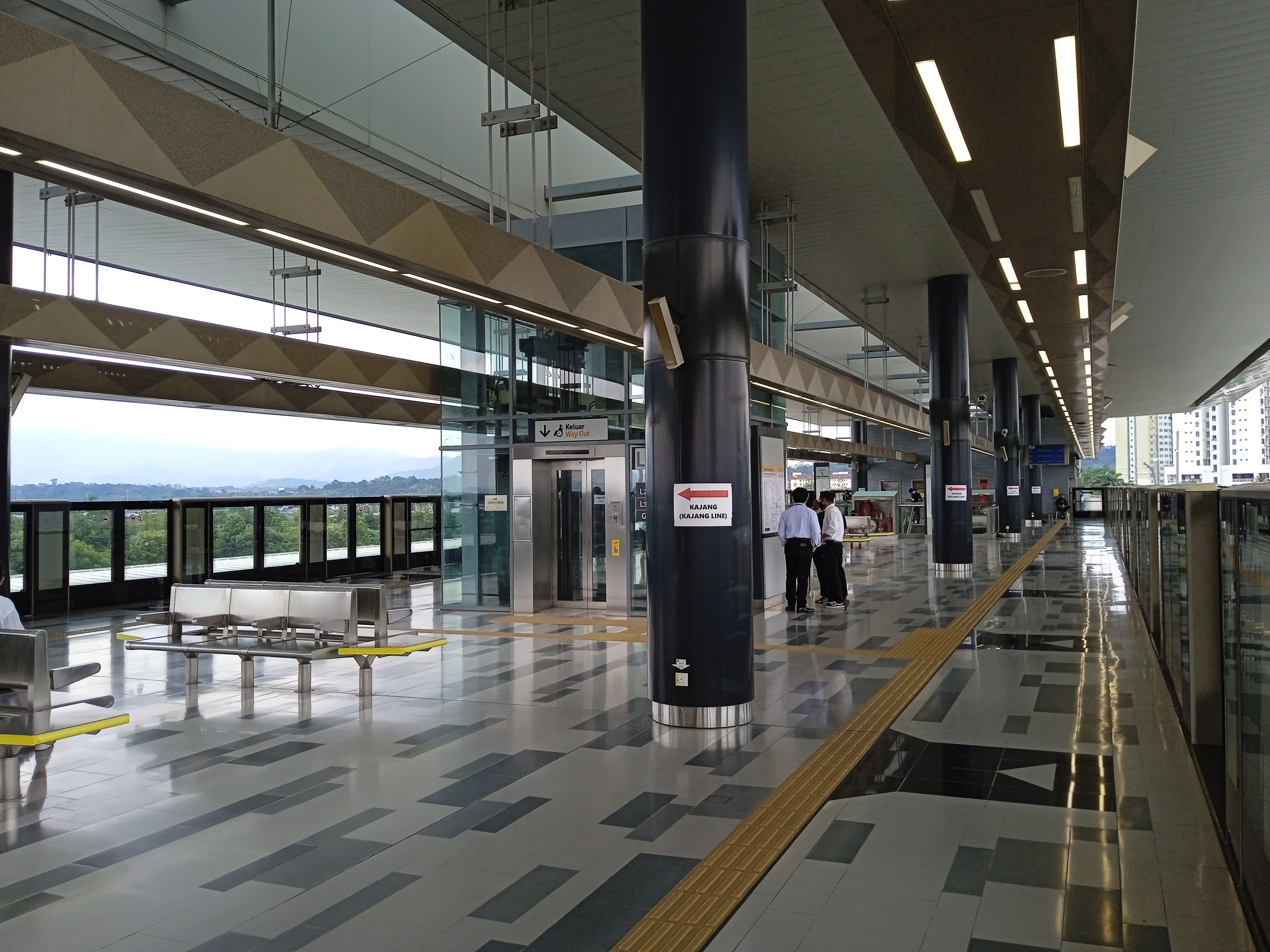
Kwasa Damansara is an interchange station between both MRT lines.

The MRT line covers a span of 47 kilometres (29 mi) from Kwasa Damansara to Kajang, passing the Kuala Lumpur city centre where the alignment goes underground. The line serves a corridor with 1.2 million residents within the Klang Valley region from the northwest to the southeast of Kuala Lumpur. The line starts from Kwasa Damansara which is located to the northwest of Kuala Lumpur, and runs on an elevated guideway to the Semantan portal, passing through Kota Damansara, Bandar Utama, Seksyen 17 Petaling Jaya, Bukit Kiara and the Damansara Town Centre. Kwasa Damansara station provides a cross-platform interchange between the MRT Kajang Line and the Putrajaya Line. The line continues in twin-bore tunnels underground to the Maluri portal, passing through the city centre and the Golden Triangle of Kuala Lumpur. Interchanges to other lines are provided from Muzium Negara to Maluri with the exception of Cochrane in Kuala Lumpur. Beyond Taman Pertama, the line passes through Cheras and ends in Kajang via an elevated guideway.

=== Station designs ===
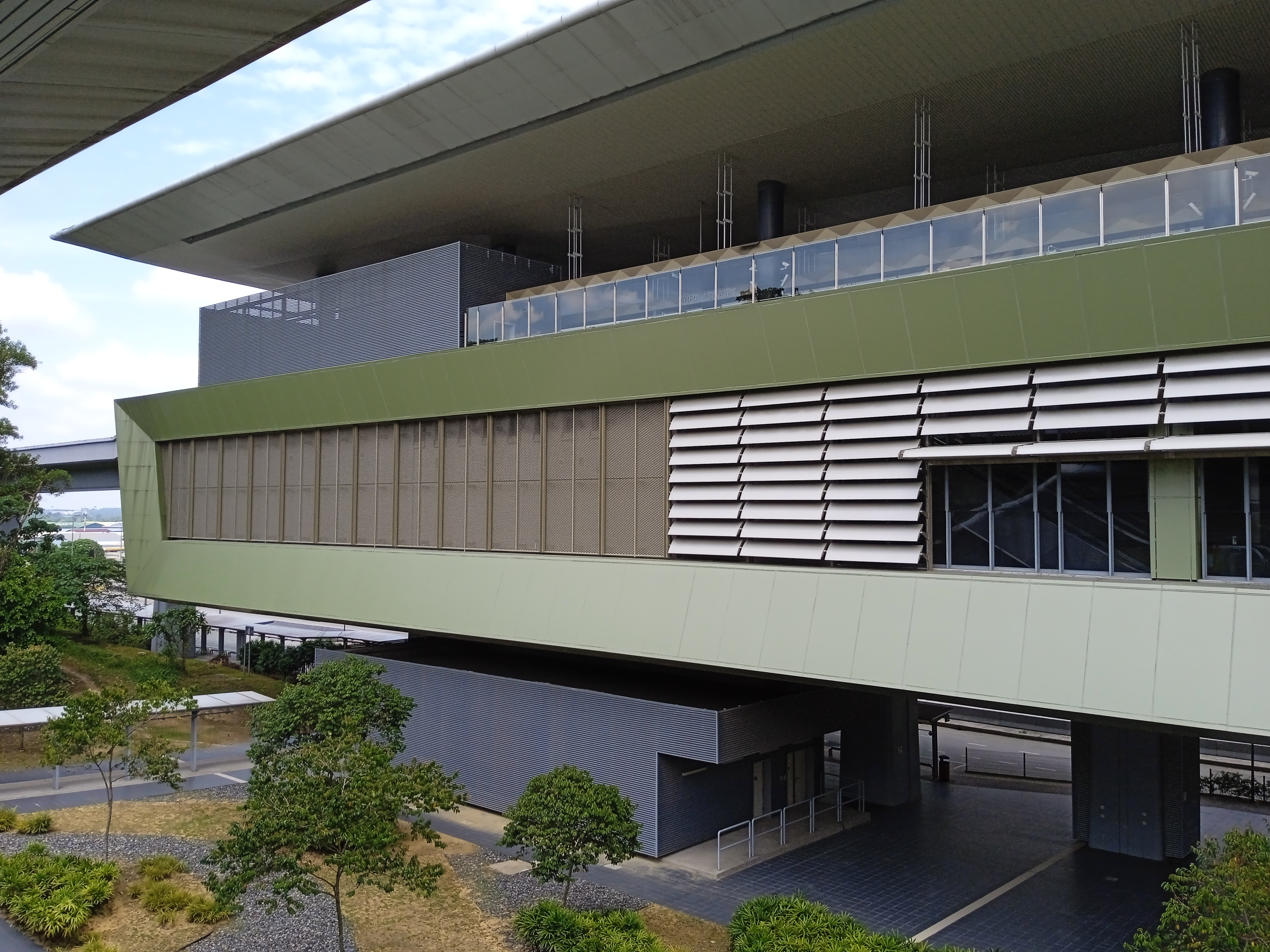
A view of the former MRT Kajang Line station Kampung Selamat from Entrance A before it was absorbed into the Putrajaya Line

For the seven underground stations, the overall inspiration was from the Klang Gates Quartz Ridge, a pure quartz dyke found in the Klang Valley which has multi-faceted characteristics and has kaleidoscopic reflections. These features resemble Malaysia's multi-racial, multi-cultural and progressive society. The concept is used in the designs of the different murals in the underground stations. Muzium Negara is fitted with tiles that depict the transition of the city's mode of public transport while Pasar Seni is "painted" with 'Y's, which represents the convergence of the Klang and Gombak rivers. Merdeka has the Rukun Negara sculpted on the walls of the concourse. Tun Razak Exchange has designs of blue and grey motifs representing a modern Islamic Corporate theme. Cochrane features harmonious red and yellow colours while Bukit Bintang has vibrant red patterns. Maluri is filled with bright green, blue and yellow tiles which symbolises urban renewal.

All stations are wheelchair accessible, with lifts and escalators serving each platform. All platforms are equipped with Platform Screen Doors (PSD).

== List of stations ==
Station code	Station name	Images	Opening	Platform type	Position	Park & Ride	Connecting Bus Lines	Working Name	Interchange station	Notes	Theme
KG04	Kwasa Damansara		16 December 2016	Stacked Island	Elevated	✓	N/A	Kota Damansara	Northern terminus. Cross-platform interchange with PY01 Putrajaya Line.	Northern terminus of both the MRT Kajang Line and MRT Putrajaya Line. The KWSP Tower (Headquarters) is located near this station.	
KG05	Kwasa Sentral		16 December 2016	Side	Elevated	✓	T772; T801; T802; T803; T804; T804B	Taman Industri Sungai Buloh		Feeder Bus T804 to KS03 Terminal Skypark for the KTM KL Sentral-Terminal Skypark Line.	
KG05A	Teknologi		-	-	-	-	-	-	-	Provisional station	
KG06	Kota Damansara–Thomson Hospital		16 December 2016	Side	Elevated	N/A	T805; 780	PJU 5		Exit to Thomson Hospital Kota Damansara	
KG07	Surian–IOI Mall Damansara		16 December 2016	Side	Elevated	N/A	T807; T808; 780; 802	Dataran Sunway		Feeder Bus T807 to KJ25 Lembah Subang for the LRT Kelana Jaya Line. Exit to IOI Mall Damansara, IOI Residence Damansara and Sunway Nexis.	
KG08	Mutiara Damansara		16 December 2016	Side	Elevated	N/A	T809; T810; PJ06; 780; 801; 802	The Curve		Exit to The Curve, IPC Shopping Centre, IKEA Damansara and Lotus's Mutiara Damansara.	
Parallel crossover tracks
KG09	Bandar Utama		16 December 2016	Side	Elevated	✓	T811; T812; PJ05; PJ06; 780; 802	One Utama	Connecting station with SA01 Shah Alam line	Exit to 1 Utama Shopping Centre.	
KG10	Taman Tun Dr Ismail–Deloitte (TTDI)		16 December 2016	Side	Elevated	N/A	T813; T814	TTDI			
KG11	~~Seksyen 17~~	-	-	-	-	-	-	-	-	Shelved station	
Parallel crossover tracks
KG12	Phileo Damansara		16 December 2016	Island	Elevated	✓	T815; T816	Seksyen 16		Feeder bus T815 to the University of Malaya	
KG12A	Bukit Kiara Selatan		2027	Side	Elevated	N/A		Bukit Kiara Selatan	Proposed interchange with CC01 MRT Circle Line	Future station.	
KG13	Pavilion Damansara Heights–Pusat Bandar Damansara		16 December 2016	Side	Elevated	✓	T817	Pusat Bandar Damansara		Feeder bus T817 to Mid Valley South Gate, providing access to KB01 Mid Valley on the KTM Batu Caves-Pulau Sebang Line. Exit to Pavilion Damansara Heights.	
KG14	Semantan		16 December 2016	Side	Elevated	N/A	T818; T821; T852T850; T822B	Semantan		Feeder busT819 to Hilton Kuala Lumpur (which is walking distance from KA01 KS01 KJ15 KE1 KT1 KL Sentral, MR1 KL Sentral Monorail and KG15 Muzium Negara) and to KA05 Segambut on the KTM Tanjung Malim-Port Klang Line.	
Parallel crossover tracks
KG15	Muzium Negara		17 July 2017	Island	Underground	N/A	GOKL 03T851	KL Sentral	Connecting station to KL Sentral main terminal building via an 850-metre underground pedestrian linkway for: KA01 KS01 KTM Batu Caves-Pulau Sebang Line, KTM Tanjung Malim-Port Klang Line, KTM KL Sentral-Terminal Skypark Line and KTM ETS; KJ15 Kelana Jaya Line; KT1 ERL KLIA Transit; KE1 ERL KLIA Ekspres and MR1 KL Monorail; Connecting station to MR1 KL Sentral Monorail on the KL Monorail via a linkbridge from NU Sentral Mall, accessed from the KL Sentral Main terminal building	Exit to NU Sentral Mall Exit to NU Sentral via an underground walkway.	Transition, History of Kuala Lumpur's Public Transportation
KG16	Pasar Seni		17 July 2017	Island	Underground	N/A	GOKL 02; 151; 180; 400; 450; 580; 590; 600; 640; 650; 750; 751; 770; 772; 780; 782; 821; 851	Pasar Seni	Interchange station with KJ14 LRT Kelana Jaya Line Connecting station with KA02 KTM Batu Caves-Pulau Sebang Line, KTM Tanjung Malim-Port Klang Line and KTM ETS	Bus hub to Puchong, Subang Airport, Petaling Jaya, Klang, Shah Alam and Subang Jaya. Exit to Central Market, Kuala Lumpur and Chinatown.	Confluence Between Two Rivers
KG17	Merdeka–Maybank		17 July 2017	Island	Underground	N/A	N/A	Merdeka / Stadium Merdeka	Interchange station with AG8 SP8 Plaza Rakyat for the Ampang and Sri Petaling lines	Exit to Merdeka 118.	Independence, Spirit of Nationhood, Malaysia Madani
KG18A	Pavilion Kuala Lumpur–Bukit Bintang		17 July 2017	Stacked Side	Underground	N/A	GOKL 01; GOKL 02; GOKL 04; 400; 420; 421; 580	Bukit Bintang Sentral	Connecting station with MR6 KL Monorail Line.	Pedestrian access to KJ10 KLCC on the Kelana Jaya Line and MR7 Raja Chulan for the KL Monorail via an elevated walkway from Pavilion Kuala Lumpur. Exit to Lot 10, Sungei Wang Plaza, Fahrenheit 88, The Starhill and Pavilion Kuala Lumpur.	Dynamic City
KG20	Tun Razak Exchange (TRX)		17 July 2017	Stacked Island	Underground	N/A	T254B; T407; T822B	Pasar Rakyat	Cross-platform interchange with PY23 Putrajaya Line	Exit to The Exchange TRX mall and Exchange 106 Tower via an underground link.	Islamic Corporate
KG21	Cochrane		17 July 2017	Island	Underground	N/A	T352; T400; T401; GOKL 11; 420	Cochrane		Feeder bus T401 to SP12 Cheras for the LRT Sri Petaling Line. Exit to IKEA Cheras and MyTOWN Shopping Centre via an underground link.	Urban Living, Sustainable Living
KG22	Maluri–AEON		17 July 2017	Island	Underground	✓	T254B; T352; T400; T401; GOKL 10; GOKL 11; 400; 450; T822B	Maluri	Interchange station with AG13 Ampang Line.	Feeder bus T401 to SP12 Cheras for the Sri Petaling Line. Exit to Sunway Velocity Mall and AEON Mall Taman Maluri.	New Generation and Old Generation
KG23	Taman Pertama		17 July 2017	Side	Elevated	N/A	T305; 400; 450	Taman Bukit Ria			
KG24	Taman Midah		17 July 2017	Side	Elevated	✓	T305; T402; 400; 450	Taman Bukit Mewah	Proposed interchange with CC23 MRT Circle Line	Feeder bus T402 to SP13 Salak Selatan for the Sri Petaling Line and Hospital Canselor Tuanku Muhriz UKM (HUKM).	
KG25	Taman Mutiara		17 July 2017	Side	Elevated	N/A	T408; T409; 400; 450	Leisure Mall		Exit to EkoCheras Mall and Cheras Leisure Mall.	
Parallel crossover tracks										Before/After Taman Mutiara station	
Parallel crossover tracks										Alongside Exit 701C of the Cheras–Kajang Expressway	
KG26	Taman Connaught		17 July 2017	Side	Elevated	N/A	T410; T411; T412; 450	Plaza Phoenix		Feeder bus T410 to KB04 SP15 KT2 Bandar Tasik Selatan. Exit to Cheras Sentral Mall.	
KG27	Taman Suntex		17 July 2017	Island	Elevated	✓	T413; T406; 450	Taman Suntex		Exit to You City III Retail.	
Parallel crossover tracks
KG28	Sri Raya		17 July 2017	Side	Elevated	✓	T414; T406; 450	Taman Cuepacs			
KG29	Bandar Tun Hussein Onn		17 July 2017	Side	Elevated	✓	T415; T413B; KJ03	Bandar Tun Hussein Onn			
KG30	Batu 11 Cheras		17 July 2017	Side	Elevated	N/A	T416; T417; T569; 450; 590	Balakong			
KG31	Bukit Dukung		17 July 2017	Side	Elevated	✓	T453; T454B; T455; 450	Taman Koperasi Cuepacs			
Parallel crossover tracks
KG32	~~Taman Mesra~~	-	-	-	-	-	-	-	-	Shelved station	
KG33	Sungai Jernih		17 July 2017	Side	Elevated	✓	T456B; 450	Saujana Impian / Sungai Kantan			
KG34	Stadium Kajang		17 July 2017	Side	Elevated	N/A	T450; T451; T457; T458; T459; T460; KJ01; 450	Bandar Kajang		Feeder bus T451 to Universiti Kebangsaan Malaysia (UKM) via KB06 Kajang and KB07 UKM stations along the KTM Batu Caves-Pulau Sebang Line. Exit to Restoran Sate Kajang HJ Samuri	
KG35	Kajang		17 July 2017	Island	Elevated	✓	T451; T461; T462; T463; T463B; T464; 450	Kajang	Southern terminus. Connecting station with KB06 KTM Batu Caves-Pulau Sebang Line and KTM ETS	8 minutes walk to New Era University College	

== Rolling stock ==
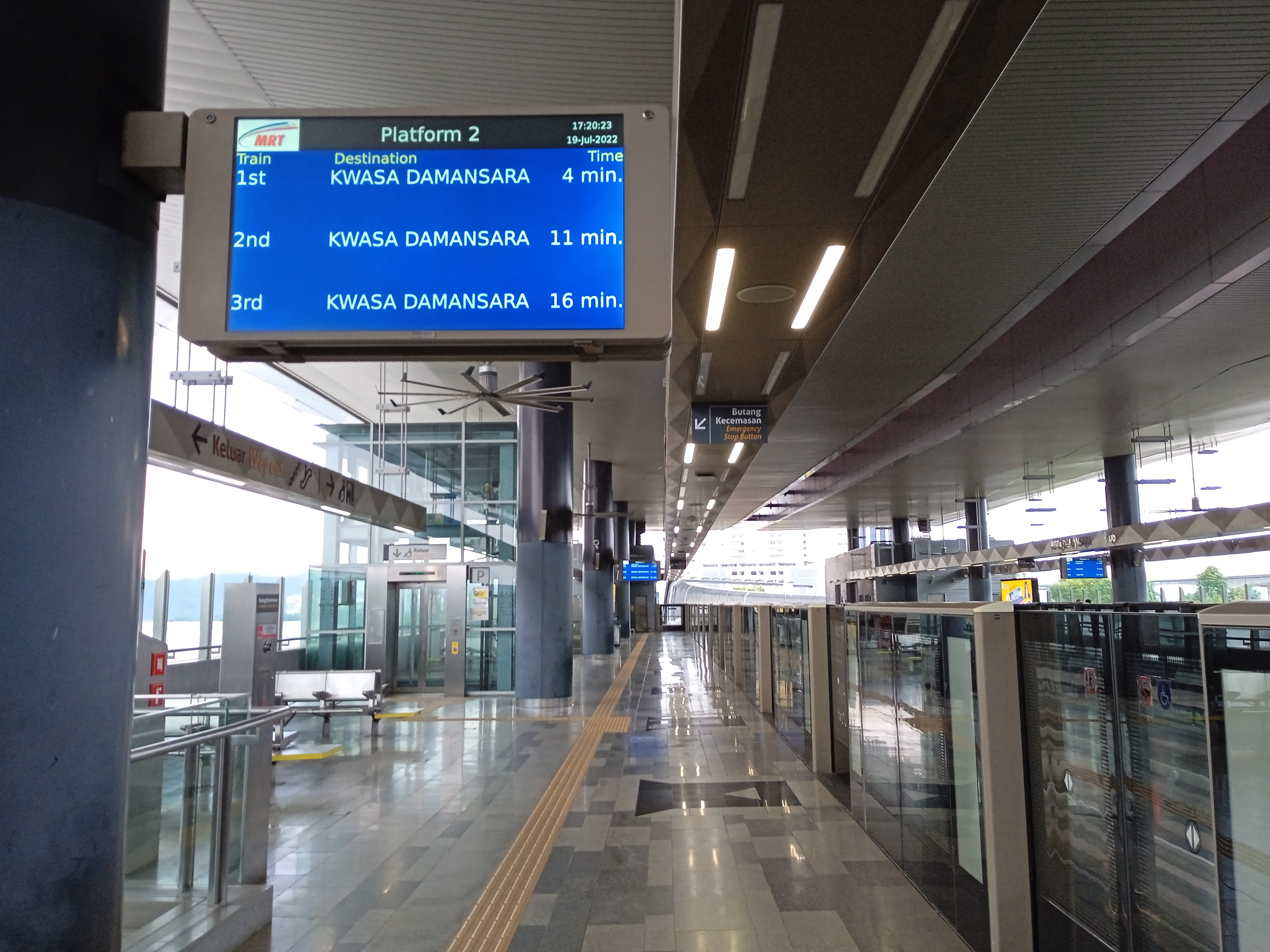
MRT KG Line real time passenger information display system (PIDS)

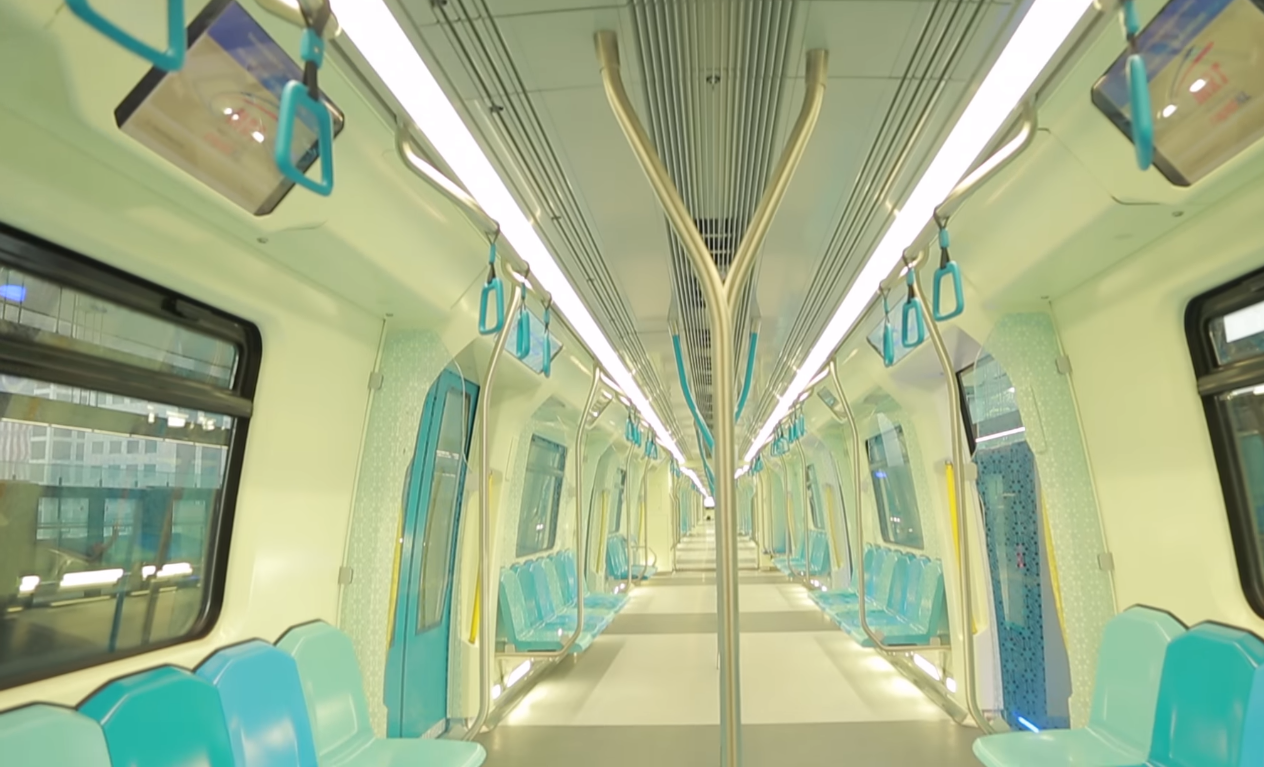
MRT KG Line rolling stock interior designed by BMW Group Designworks

According to MRT Corp, the four-car train sets are servicing the line with an average headway of 3.5 minutes in an hour, equivalent to 400,000 passengers per day.

The rolling stock called “Guiding Light” is manufactured by Siemens/CSR Nanjing Puzhen in a partnership with SMH Rail Consortium Sdn Bhd. The trains will be driverless with a capacity of 1,200 passengers in a 4-car trainsets formation. The Siemens Inspiro rolling stock will be supplied with the same configuration as the trainsets supplied for Warsaw Metro M1.

- 29 June 2014: The first two train car bodies arrived in Westport, Port Klang, Selangor. The train will be assembled in the country's first train assembly plant in Rasa, Hulu Selangor. The purpose-built plant for the KVMRT project is solely owned and operated by SMH Rail Sdn Bhd. SMH Rail had a consortium partnership with Siemens AG and Siemens Malaysia. Work to assemble the trains began immediately after the first two train car bodies arrived in Westport. The time taken to assemble one train set is about 30 days. The plant has two assembly lines, allowing work on four trains sets to be carried out at the same time.
- 30 November 2014: Another 14 train car bodies had arrived.

Car length (over coupler): 22.89 m (75 ft 1 in) (end car), 22.2 m (72 ft 10 in) (intermediate car)

4 passenger doors per car side door width: 1400 mm

Traction power supply: 750 V DC, Third Rail

The 4-car trainsets are maintained at 2 purpose-built facilities, Sungai Buloh and Kajang depots, located nearby Kwasa Damansara and Sungai Jernih stations respectively.

Approximately 42 trains are required during peak hour operations to maintain a 3-minute frequency. There are 58 trainsets in total for the Kajang Line.

=== Formation ===
The train set consists of four cars, with car 1 facing towards Kajang and car 2 facing towards Kwasa Damansara.

Set designation	1	3	4	2
Formation	Motor Car	Trailer Car	Trailer Car	Motor Car

As of December 2025, a maximum of 39 of the 58 train sets are used during peak hours (4-5 minute frequency). According to Transport Minister Anthony Loke, this is because the remaining fleet are awaiting wheel replacements involving all 58 train sets, which is being carried out in stages from June 2022. Currently, 47 out of 58 trains had completed the process.

== Ridership ==
MRT Kajang Line Ridership
Year	Month/Quarter	Ridership	Annual Ridership	Change (%)	Notes
2026	Q4	8,441,134	80,055,935		As of October 2026
2026	Q3	25,148,976	80,055,935		
2026	Q2	23,787,665	80,055,935		
2026	Q1	22,678,160	80,055,935		
2025	Q4	24,186,974	92,737,532	▲9.7	Highest on record
2025	Q3	24,153,778	92,737,532	▲9.7	Highest on record
2025	Q2	22,740,322	92,737,532	▲9.7	Highest on record
2025	Q1	21,656,458	92,737,532	▲9.7	Highest on record
2024	Q4	23,074,623	84,520,994	▲27.1	
2024	Q3	22,028,898	84,520,994	▲27.1	
2024	Q2	20,099,040	84,520,994	▲27.1	
2024	Q1	19,324,433	84,520,994	▲27.1	
2023	Q4	19,020,393	66,501,508	▲46.6	
2023	Q3	17,247,227	66,501,508	▲46.6	
2023	Q2	15,757,999	66,501,508	▲46.6	
2023	Q1	14,475,889	66,501,508	▲46.6	
2022	Q4	13,753,773	45,348,209	▲131.7	
2022	Q3	13,688,093	45,348,209	▲131.7	
2022	Q2	10,670,569	45,348,209	▲131.7	
2022	Q1	7,235,774	45,348,209	▲131.7	
2021	Q4	6,822,387	19,573,010	▼ -41.0	Total lockdown
2021	Q3	2,666,394	19,573,010	▼ -41.0	Total lockdown
2021	Q2	4,714,785	19,573,010	▼ -41.0	Total lockdown
2021	Q1	5,369,444	19,573,010	▼ -41.0	Total lockdown
2020	Q4	6,179,979	33,168,335	▼ -48.1	COVID-19 pandemic
2020	Q3	9,608,104	33,168,335	▼ -48.1	COVID-19 pandemic
2020	Q2	3,406,537	33,168,335	▼ -48.1	COVID-19 pandemic
2020	Q1	13,973,715	33,168,335	▼ -48.1	COVID-19 pandemic
2019	Q4	17,420,684	63,952,805	▲24.6	
2019	Q3	16,370,286	63,952,805	▲24.6	
2019	Q2	15,243,503	63,952,805	▲24.6	
2019	Q1	14,918,332	63,952,805	▲24.6	
2018	Q4	14,558,640	51,314,240	▲129.6	
2018	Q3	13,424,667	51,314,240	▲129.6	
2018	Q2	11,997,681	51,314,240	▲129.6	
2018	Q1	11,333,252	51,314,240	▲129.6	
2017	Q4	10,365,061	22,350,508	-	
2017	Q3	9,318,373	22,350,508	-	KG14 Semantan – KG35 Kajang section opened on 17 July 2017
2017	Q2	1,161,218	22,350,508	-	Phase 1
2017	Q1	1,505,856	22,350,508	-	Phase 1
2016	Q4	676,495	676,495	-	SBK01 (now PY04 ) Sungai Buloh – KG14 Semantan section opened on 16 December 2016

In the second quarter of 2018, the quarterly ridership is a little short of 12 million, following an overall rising trend. However, the line is deemed to have inadequate ridership to cover the construction, operation and maintenance costs. A target of 250,000 daily passengers is required for the line to break even with its operation costs.

== Depots ==
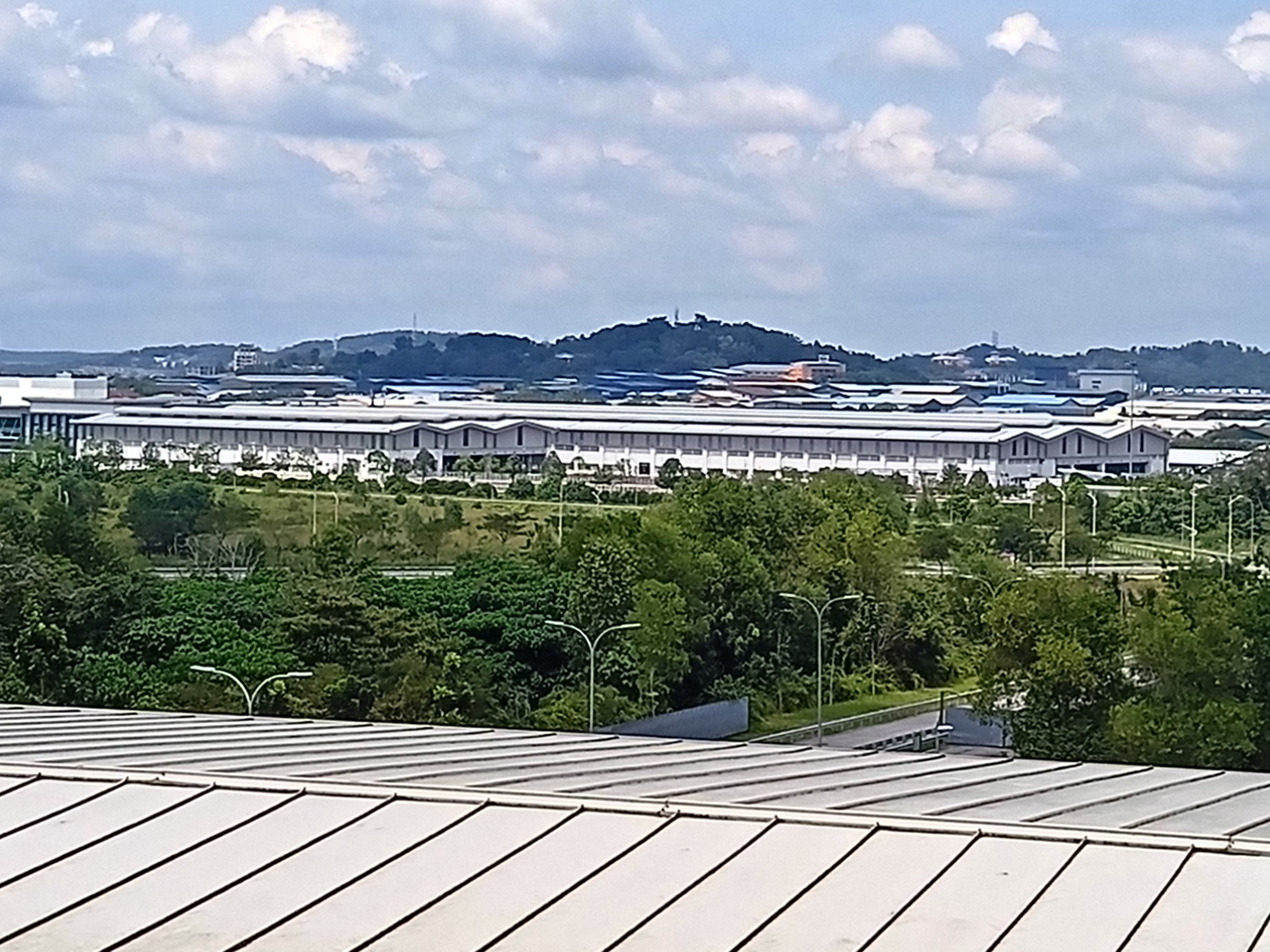
View of the Sungai Buloh Depot from Kwasa Damansara station's Platform 1 (Towards Kajang)

There are two maintenance depots for the Kajang Line, the Sungai Buloh Depot and Kajang Depot. The former is accessible by trains to the north of Kwasa Damansara station, while the latter is located near Sungai Jernih, where trains access the depot from Bukit Dukung instead.

== See also ==
- Prasarana Malaysia Berhad
  - Rapid Bus Sdn Bhd
    - Rapid KL
    - Rapid Penang
    - Rapid Kuantan
  - Rapid Rail Sdn Bhd
    - Rapid KL
  - Rapid Ferry Sdn Bhd
- MRT Corp
  - Klang Valley Mass Rapid Transit Project
- MyHSR Corp
  - Kuala Lumpur–Singapore High Speed Rail Project
- Public transport in Kuala Lumpur
- Rail transport in Malaysia

== Notes and references ==
=== References ===
- "Sungai Buloh Selangor". Facebook.
