= Tenth Malaysia Plan =

Tenth Malaysian Plan (Malay: Rancangan Malaysia ke-10), abbreviated as "10MP", is a comprehensive blueprint prepared by the Economic Planning Unit (EPU) of the Prime Minister's Department and the Ministry of Finance of Malaysia with approval by the Cabinet of Malaysia to allocate the national budget from the year 2011 to 2015 to all economic sectors in Malaysia.

The blueprint was announced on 10 June 2010, unveiled by the sixth Prime Minister of Malaysia, Datuk Seri Najib Tun Razak, in Parliament.

10MP underlines five strategic basics to achieve a higher income country status due to year 2020. These five basics are:

1. Increase the value in country economy.
2. Improve knowledge abilities and innovation, and inculcate first-world minded.
3. Handle continuously socioeconomic inequalities.
4. Improve level and ability of living quality.
5. Strengthen the institution and country's implementation.
