= Bandar Tun Hussein Onn =

Human settlement in Malaysia

Coordinates: 3.0423862°N 101.7444028°E

Bandar Tun Hussein Onn is a township in 11th-Mile Cheras (Batu 11 Cheras) in Bangi constituency, Selangor, Malaysia, about 13 km southeast of central Kuala Lumpur and 7.5 km north of Kajang. It is primarily a residential area, established in the early 1990s.

UDA Holdings Bhd is the developer of the Bandar Tun Hussein Onn township, established in 1971 by the government with authority to develop this area. In 1989, UDA Holdings acquired a 752 acres (304 ha) piece of land in Cheras known as Bandar Tun Hussein Onn.
