= Balakong =

Place in Selangor, Malaysia

Coordinates: 3°1′48″N 101°45′0″E

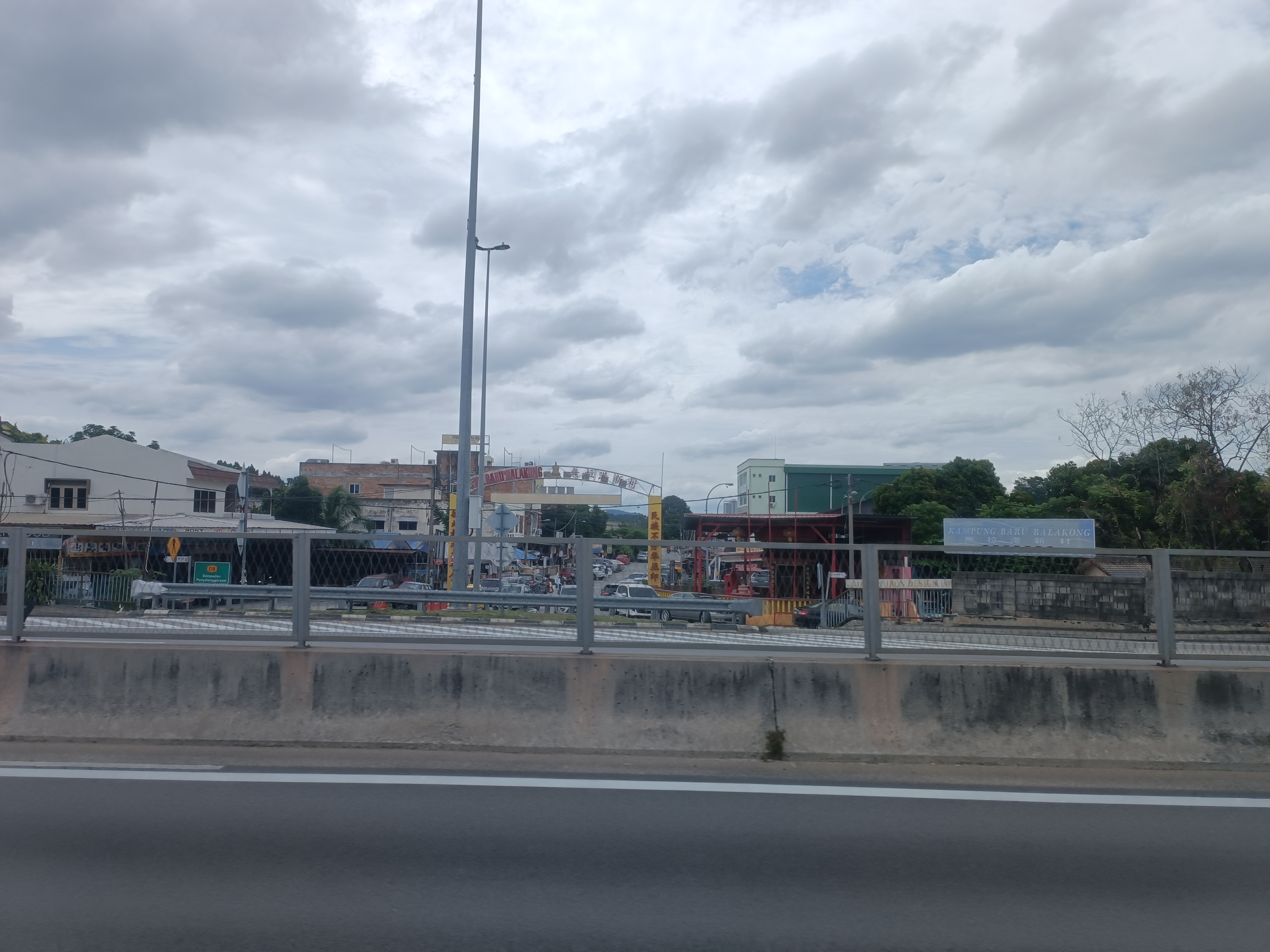
Balakong NV

Balakong is a township in Cheras, Hulu Langat District, Selangor, Malaysia. Located to the southeast of Greater Kuala Lumpur, the township consists mainly of residential condominiums, office complexes and factories. Notable landmarks in Balakong include AEON Mall Cheras Selatan and Sin Ann Meow Temple (星安庙).

== History ==
=== Name ===
According to local Chinese residents, the name Balakong comes from the Chinese New Village, Balakong Chinese New Village. The village was drawn up and barred-wired by the British Empire under the Briggs Plan during the Malayan Emergency. Another belief is that there was a river running through the village named Sungai Balak and that the village adopted the river's name. It is believed that "-Kong" in Balakong comes from the Hakka word for river (江), and Balakong refers to the Hakka pronunciation of the river, Sungai Balak. It is believed that there was an upper and lower kong within the village.

=== Before 1990s ===
The village was surrounded by rubber plantation surrounding former tin mines. Most families in the village were rubber tappers. There was a primary school, a few Chinese temples, a wet market, a hilltop Lutheran church, a cowboy town street, a town hall, and a football field. The village was divided by Sungai Balak.

=== After 1990s ===
During Taming Jaya's development, locals mentioned that the developer of Taming Jaya rebuilt Balakong Road into a two-lane highway starting at The Mines and terminated at Cheras 11th Mile. A newer road was constructed that connected the village to Taman Connaught. Taming Jaya's developer also had developed a small-industry area and housing estate on a rubber plantation opposite the village. Since the early 2010's, Balakong has seen rapid commercial development in the form of Dataran C180 and Cheras Traders Square.

== Education ==
=== List of schools in Balakong ===
==== Primary Schools ====
- Sekolah Jenis Kebangsaan (Cina) Balakong
- Sekolah Jenis Kebangsaan (Cina) Batu 11 Cheras
- Sekolah Jenis Kebangsaan (Cina) Connaught 2
- Sekolah Kebangsaan Bandar Tun Hussein Onn
- Sekolah Kebangsaan Bandar Tun Hussein Onn 2
- Sekolah Kebangsaan Cheras Jaya
- Sekolah Kebangsaan Desa Baiduri
- Sekolah Kebangsaan Taming Jaya
- Sekolah Jenis Kebangsaan (Tamil) Kajang
- Sekolah Jenis Kebangsaan (Tamil) Bandar Mahkota Cheras

==== Secondary Schools ====
- Sekolah Menengah Kebangsaan Bandar Damai Perdana
- Sekolah Menengah Kebangsaan Bandar Tun Hussein Onn 2
- Sekolah Menengah Kebangsaan Cheras Jaya
- Sekolah Menengah Kebangsaan Cheras Perdana
- Sekolah Menengah Kebangsaan Perimbun

== Politics ==
Balakong, at the federal level, is part of the Bangi parliamentary constituency. Bangi has been represented in the Dewan Rakyat of the Parliament by Syahredzan Johan of Pakatan Harapan (PH) and the Democratic Action Party (DAP) since 2022. Syahredzan won the seat and was elected as a Member of Parliament (MP) in the 2022 general election.

At the state level, Balakong is the Balakong state constituency. Balakong has been represented in the Selangor State Legislative Assembly by Wayne Ong Chun Wei, also of PH and DAP since 2023. Ong won the seat and was elected as a Member of the Legislative Assembly (MLA) in the 2023 Selangor state election.

At the local level, Balakong is administered by the Kajang Municipal Council (MPKj).

== Infrastructure ==
=== Transportation ===
Balakong is accessible via the Balakong Interchange of SILK Expressway Kajang Dispersal Link Expressway, which connects the BESRAYA Expressway Sungai Besi Expressway near Seri Kembangan in the west to the Grand Saga Expressway Cheras–Kajang Expressway (part of the National Route 1 system). The township has since developed into an integrated township with residential, commercial and industrial areas.

=== Public transport ===
The MRT Kajang line, running parallel to National Route 1, serves the locality via the Bandar Tun Hussein Onn and Cheras 11 Miles stations. Opened in 2017, they are part of the Klang Valley Integrated Transit System. Cheras 11 Miles station is located at Balakong Interchange of the Grand Saga toll road.

=== Shopping ===
AEON Mall Cheras Selatan is the largest mall in the town, while nearby malls include BMC Mall, AEON BIG Bandar Tun Hussein Onn and Econsave.

=== Healthcare ===
Kajang Hospital is the nearest public hospital. The private Columbia Asia Hospital opened in Cheras 11 Miles in 2010.
