= Sri Petaling line extension =

LRT Sri Petaling Line Extension
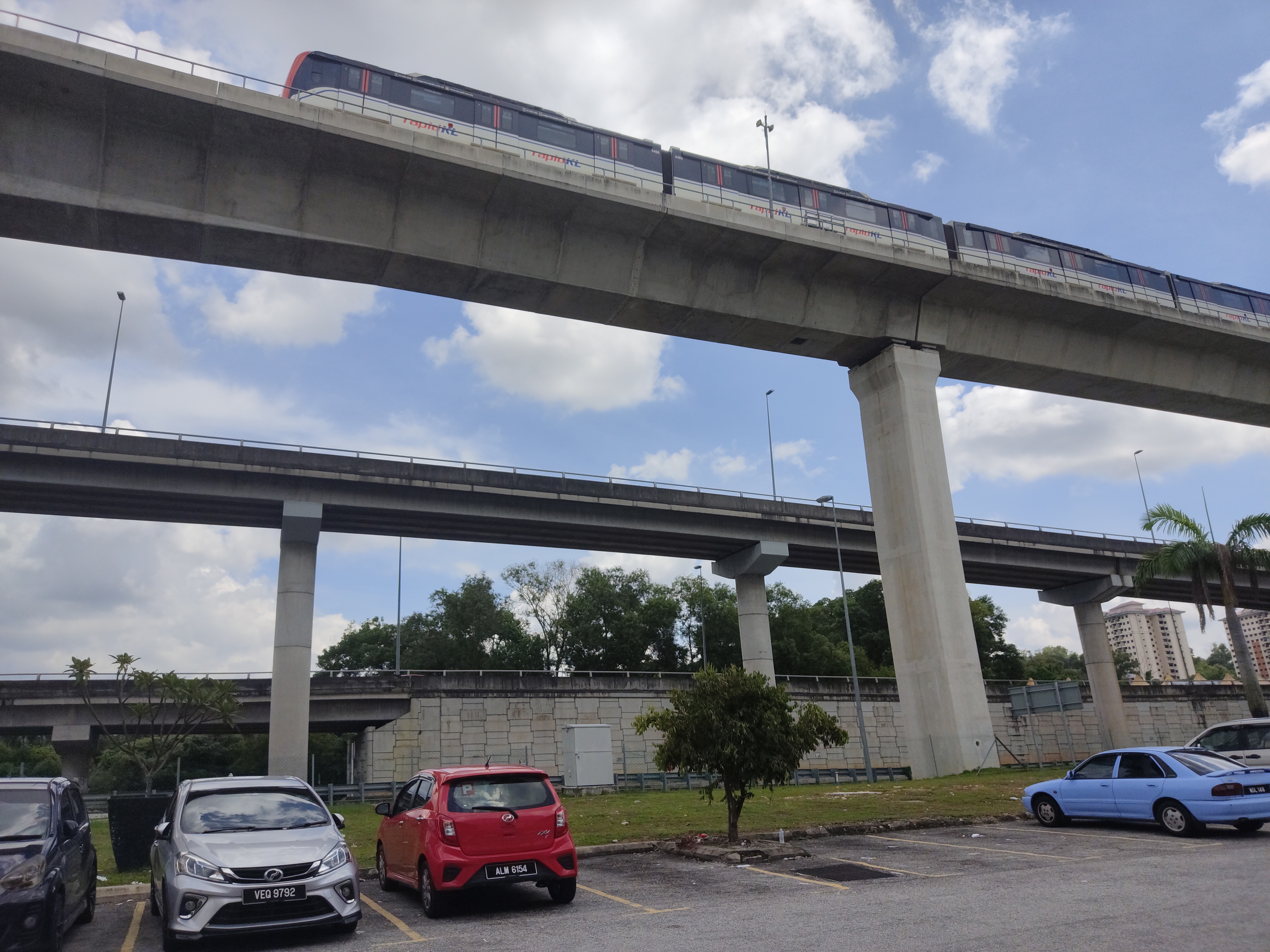
- LRT viaduct is being built under the extension project in Puchong

Overview
- Status: Opened
- Owner: Prasarana Malaysia
- Locale: Malaysia
- Termini: SP18 Sri Petaling; SP31 Putra Heights
- Stations: 11

Service
- Type: Rapid transit
- System: Rapid KL; Klang Valley Integrated Transit System
- Services: 1
- Operator: Rapid Rail
- Depot: Kuala Sungai Baru Depot

History
- Opened: 30 June 2016; 10 years ago

Technical
- Line length: 17.7 km
- Operating speed: 70 km/h

The LRT Sri Petaling Line extension is an extension of the LRT Sri Petaling Line completed in 2016, extending 17.7 kilometres from Sri Petaling station to Putra Heights.

The LRT Sri Petaling Line is part of a single LRT system, which also includes the LRT Ampang Line. Both lines were initially labelled as services or branches of a single line (known as the STAR LRT line from 1998 and Ampang Line from 2004). Both services share a common route between the terminus Sentul Timur and Chan Sow Lin, before splitting and travelling to their respective termini at Ampang and Sri Petaling (later, Putra Heights). The services were eventually rebranded as two separate lines, although they are still part of a single and shared system.

== History ==
Extensions to the LRT Kelana Jaya Line and LRT Sri Petaling Line (formerly known as PUTRA and STAR LRT, respectively) were proposed by the Malaysian government in 2006. The proposal suggested extensions from Kelana Jaya and Sri Petaling to Subang Jaya and Puchong, respectively, converging at Putra Heights. (Note: In addition to these two extensions, a new LRT line between Kota Damansara and Cheras was proposed to improve public transport in the Klang Valley. This would later become the MRT Kajang Line.)

The LRT Extension Project (LEP) was part of a RM10 billion plan to expand Kuala Lumpur's public transport network.

The proposed extension included 17.7 km of elevated track to serve 11 new stations and extended the line's terminus from Sri Petaling to Putra Heights. This was the first the LRT Sri Petaling Line served the state of Selangor; it was previously fully contained within the borders of the Federal Territory of Kuala Lumpur. The line was extended beyond Sri Petaling to serve a portion of southern Kuala Lumpur as well as Puchong in Selangor, before terminating at Putra Heights in Subang Jaya where it meets the LRT Kelana Jaya Line.

== Opening ==
The initial section of the extension opened on 31 October 2015, with four new stations: Awan Besar, Muhibbah, Alam Sutera and Kinrara BK 5. The fare of the extension was free for one month while passengers had to change trains at Sri Petaling. The second section opened five months later to Bandar Puteri, with intermediate stations at IOI Puchong Jaya, Pusat Bandar Puchong and Taman Perindustrian Puchong.

The final extension, inclusive of the extension of the LRT Kelana Jaya Line, was completed and opened on 30 June 2016. The new stations along this extension are Puchong Perdana, Puchong Prima, Putra Heights.

Fare increases are based on the distance traveled on the extension.

== Services and rolling stock ==
In conjunction with the extension project, 50 new sets of six-car light rail vehicles (LRV) were ordered from CRRC Zhuzhou Locomotive Co., Ltd.. Eight sets served the initial section from Sri Petaling to Kinrara BK 5. The trains were designed to provide more comfort for commuters. The new trains are equipped with wheelchair compartments, designated priority seating, walkthrough carriages, stainless steel seats, onboard destination displays, an integrated dynamic route map, and CCTV cameras for additional security, providing the line with these features for the first time. As the extension progressed, the new rolling stock was used for the newer sections of the line. Due to the difference in the signalling systems, the new rolling stock was not used for services beyond Sri Petaling station, which were still using the older Adtranz electric multiple unit (EMU) trains. Passengers were required to switch trains at Sri Petaling station between the extension of the line and services on the existing portion beyond Sri Petaling.

In July 2016, one month after the completion of the extension to Putra Heights, the signalling system of the LRT Sri Petaling Line was completed, and the new rolling stock was deployed for the entire line (Sentul Timur-Putra Heights), as well as the LRT Ampang Line in December 2016, after which, the older Adtranz trains were retired completely.

== Infrastructure ==
As part of a green initiative, the extension includes green practices. Energy-efficient lights and rainwater harvesting systems were installed in every station. Windows were designed to allow sunlight into the stations. Construction utilized sustainable materials and recycling practices.
