= Jalan Kompleks Sukan =

Road in Malaysia

Route information
- Existed: 1995–present
- History: Completed in 1997

Major junctions
- North end: Awan Kecil Interchange
- Shah Alam Expressway Shah Alam Expressway; FT 217 Bukit Jalil Highway
- South end: Technology Park Malaysia

Location
- Country: Malaysia
- Primary destinations: Kompleks Sukan Negara

Highway system
- Highways in Malaysia; Expressways; Federal; State

Jalan Kompleks Sukan is a major road in Kuala Lumpur, Malaysia.

== List of junctions ==
km	Exit	Junctions	To	Remarks
			North; Jalan 2/149; Taman Seri Endah; Awan Kecil	
Jalan 2/149; DBKL border limit
Shah Alam Expressway Shah Alam Expressway; Kesas border limit
		Awan Kecil-SAE	Shah Alam Expressway Shah Alam Expressway West; Petaling Jaya; Subang Jaya; Ipoh; Kuala Lumpur International Airport (KLIA); Shah Alam; West Port; South Port; North Port; Klang East; Kuala Lumpur; Cheras; Ampang; Kuantan; Seremban; Melaka; Johor Bahru	Diamond stacked interchange
Shah Alam Expressway Shah Alam Expressway; Kesas border limit
Jalan Kompleks Sukan; DBKL border limit
		Sri Petaling LRT station		
		Vista Komanwel	Vista Komanwel Condomunium; International Medical University	T-junctions
		Bukit Komanwel	V	
		Jalan Merah Cagar	East; Jalan Merah Cagar; Taman Seri Endah; Shah Alam Expressway Shah Alam Expressway; Klang; Kuala Lumpur	T-junctions
		Kompleks Sukan Negara (National Sports Complex) (Main entrance)	Kompleks Sukan Negara (National Sports Complex); Stadium Nasional	T-junctions
		Institut Sukan Negara	Institut Sukan Negara; Bukit Jalil Sports School	
		Jalan 2/155A	West; Jalan 2/155A; Arena Green Apartment; Sekolah Menengah Kebangsaan Bukit Jalil	T-junctions
Jalan Kompleks Sukan; DBKL border limit
FT 217 Bukit Jalil Highway; JKR border limit
		Puchong-Sungai Besi Highway	FT 217 Bukit Jalil Highway West; Puchong; Petaling Jaya; Putrajaya; Cyberjaya; Kuala Lumpur International Airport (KLIA) East; Sungai Besi; Kuala Lumpur; Seremban; Melaka; Johor Bahru	Diamond interchange
FT 217 Bukit Jalil Highway; JKR border limit
Technology Park Malaysia
		Technology Park Malaysia	Integrated Transport Information System (ITIS) main headquarters	

Preceding interchange	Expressways	Following interchange
513; Awan Besar Interchange (towards Pandamaran)	Shah Alam Expressway Shah Alam Expressway	515; Sukom Interchange (towards Sri Petaling)
2003; Kuchai Lama Interchange (towards Kuala Lumpur)	Maju Expressway Maju Expressway	2005; Putrajaya Interchange (towards Putrajaya)
