= Kinrara BK 5 LRT station =

Metro station in Selangor, Malaysia

Coordinates: 3°3′2.0″N 101°38′39.2″E

SP22 Kinrara BK 5
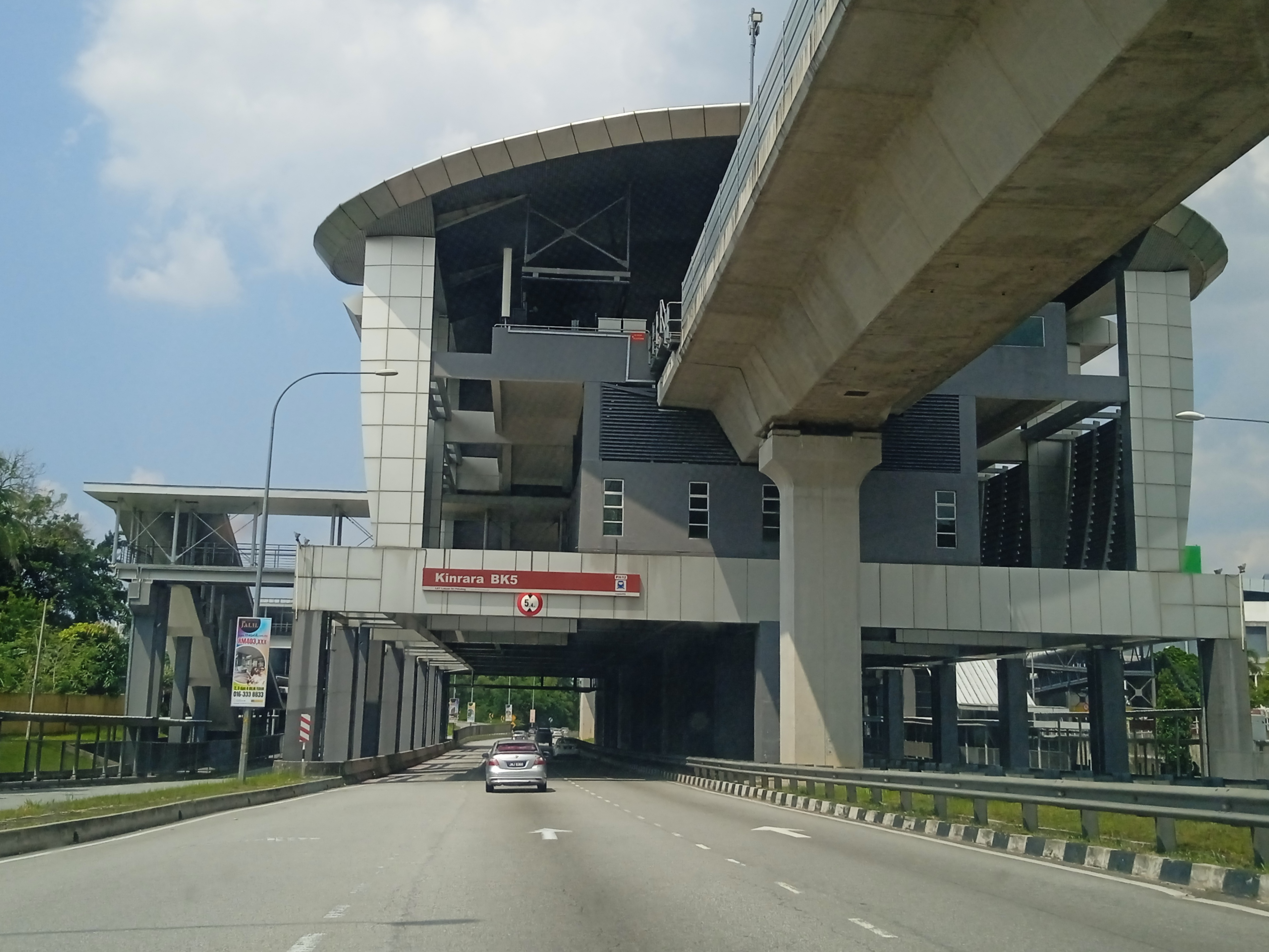
- Facade of the station from the highway (from the direction of Bukit Jalil)

General information
- Other names: Malay: کينرارا بي.کي. ليم (Jawi); Chinese: 金銮镇第五区; Tamil: கின்ராரா பி.கே. 5
- Location: Bukit Jalil Highway; Bandar Kinrara; 47180 Puchong; Selangor; Malaysia
- System: Rapid KL
- Owner: Prasarana Malaysia
- Operator: Rapid Rail
- Line: 4 Sri Petaling Line
- Platforms: 2 side platforms
- Tracks: 2

Construction
- Structure type: Elevated
- Parking: Available with payment. 176 total parking bays.

Other information
- Station code: SP22

History
- Opened: 31 October 2015; 10 years ago

Services
Preceding station		Following station
Alam Sutera towards Sentul Timur	Sri Petaling Line	IOI Puchong Jaya towards Putra Heights
Location

The Kinrara BK 5 LRT station is a light rapid transit (LRT) station in Bandar Kinrara, Puchong, Selangor. It was the southern terminus for passenger services on the LRT Sri Petaling Line Extension Project (LEP) Phase 1.

It is served by the LRT Sri Petaling Line. Like most other LRT stations operating in the Klang Valley, this station is elevated.

The LEP project that began in the middle of 2013 extended the LRT line from Sri Petaling, beginning at Awan Besar and passing through Bandar Kinrara and parts of Puchong, before terminating at Putra Heights. The extension is 17.7 km long with 11 new stations and was completed in stages. The first stage of 4 stations, including Kinrara BK 5 station, was completed in September 2015 and commenced operations on 31 October 2015.

The rest of the extension was completed, and full revenue service from Sentul Timur to Putra Heights commenced operations on 30 June 2016.

== Nearby locations ==
- Giant Hypermarket Bandar Kinrara
- Kinrara Oval
