= Alam Sutera LRT station =

Railway station in Bukit Jalil, Malaysia

Coordinates: 3°3′17.2″N 101°39′23.2″E

SP21 Alam Sutera
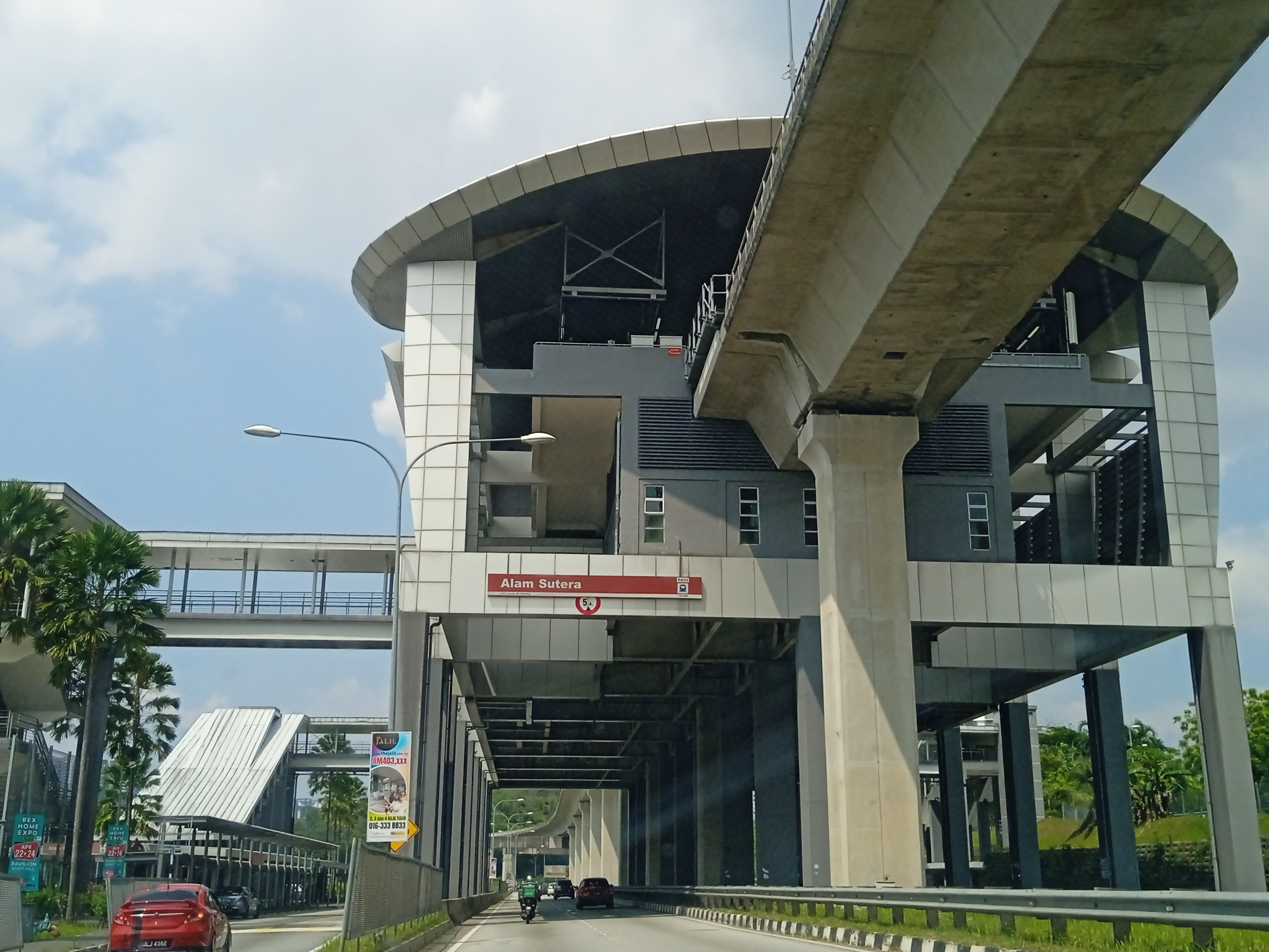
- Overall view of the station from FT 217.

General information
- Other names: Malay: عالم سوترا (Jawi); Chinese: 阿南苏特拉; Tamil: ஆலாம் சுத்திரா
- Location: Bukit Jalil Highway, Bandar Kinrara, 47100 Puchong; Selangor; Malaysia
- System: Rapid KL
- Owner: Prasarana Malaysia
- Operator: Rapid Rail
- Line: 4 Sri Petaling Line
- Platforms: 2 side platforms
- Tracks: 2

Construction
- Structure type: Elevated
- Parking: Not available

Other information
- Station code: SP21

History
- Opened: 31 October 2015; 11 years ago

Services
Preceding station		Following station
Muhibbah towards Sentul Timur	Sri Petaling Line	Kinrara BK 5 towards Putra Heights
Location

The Alam Sutera LRT station is a light rapid transit (LRT) station serving Alam Sutera, a suburb of Bukit Jalil, Kuala Lumpur about 21 km south of the city centre, It also serves the BK 1 and BK 9 neighbourhoods of Bandar Kinrara, a suburb of Puchong. The station is part of the LRT Sri Petaling Line. Despite its name, the station is physically located in the state of Selangor. Like most other LRT stations operating in Klang Valley, this station is elevated.

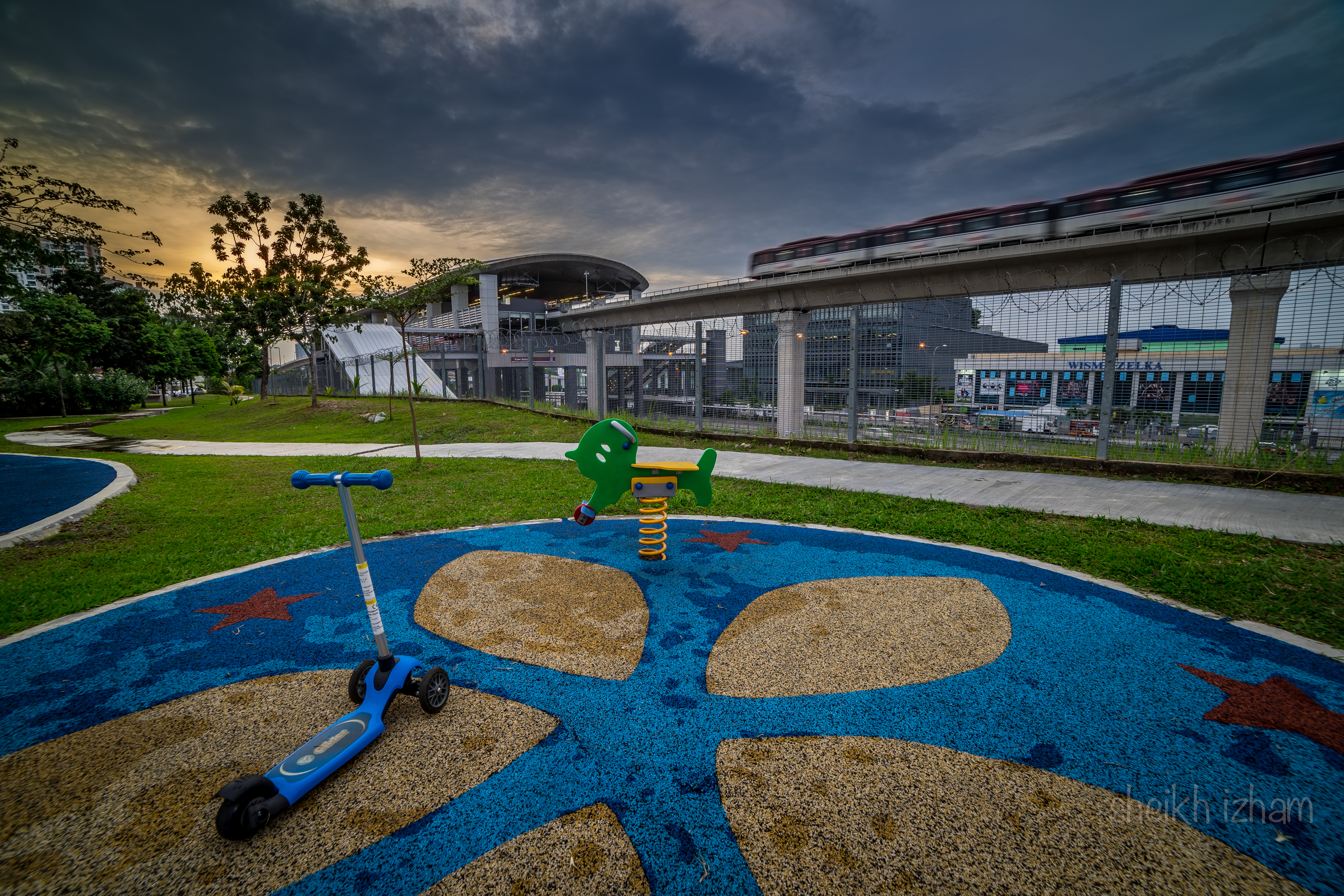
View of the station from a nearby playground in Alam Sutera
