= Bukit Jalil =

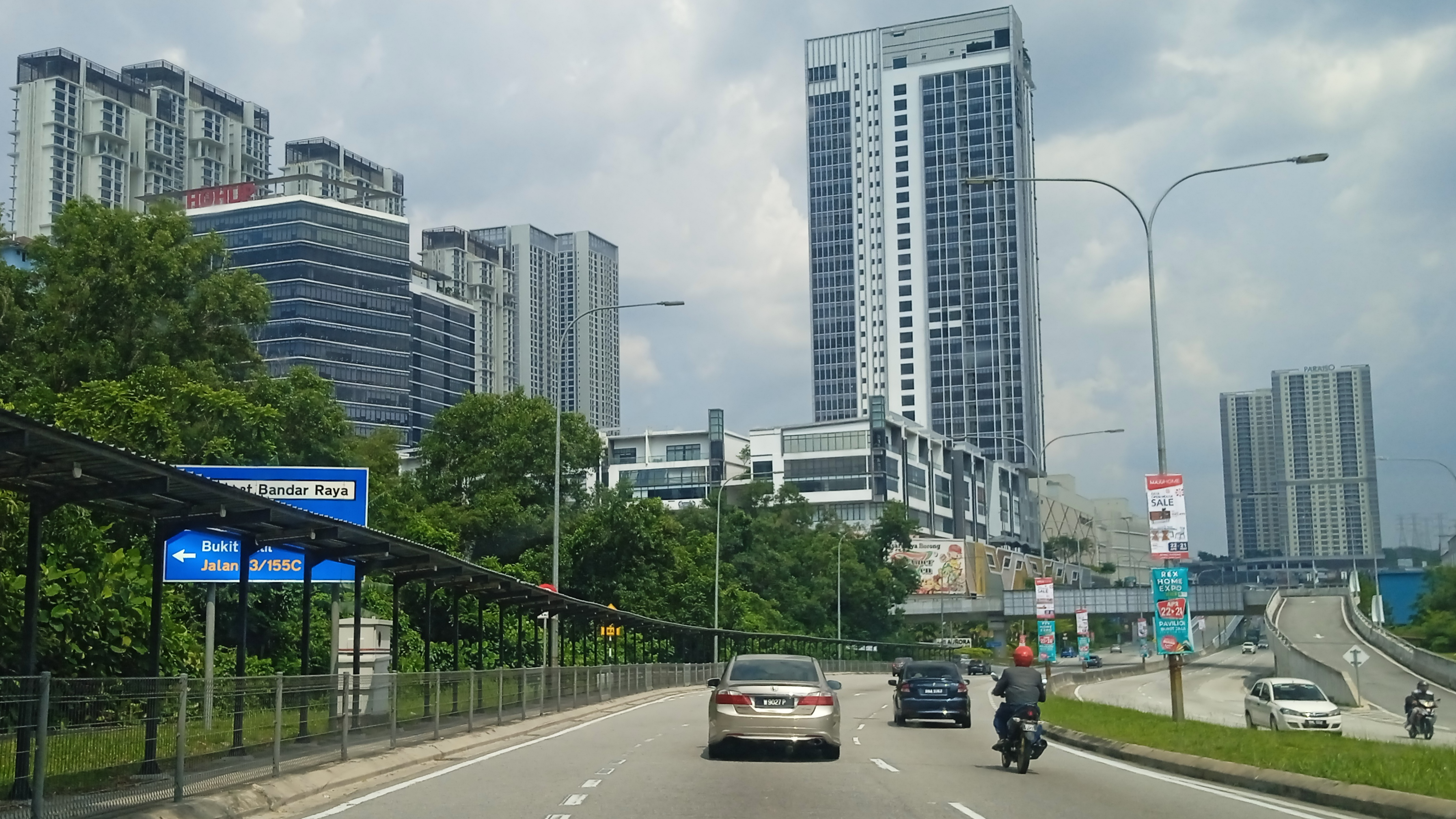
- Lebuhraya Bukit Jalil in Bukit Jalil

- Location within Malaysia
- Coordinates: 3°3′31″N 101°41′31″E
- Country: Malaysia
- Federal Territory: Kuala Lumpur
- Constituency: Seputeh

Government
  - Local Authority: Dewan Bandaraya Kuala Lumpur
  - Mayor: Mhd Amin Nordin Abdul Aziz
- Time zone: UTC+8 (MST)
- Postcode: 57000
- Dialling code: +60 3
- Police: Bukit Jalil
- Fire: Bukit Jalil

Bukit Jalil is an affluent suburb in Kuala Lumpur, Malaysia. It is bounded by the National Sports Complex on the east, the Shah Alam Expressway on the north, city boundaries to the west, and the Puchong–Sungai Besi Highway in addition to city boundaries to the south. It was known as the Bukit Jalil Estate until 1992 when the National Sports Complex was developed for the 1998 Commonwealth Games. The suburb was used as a filming location for the 1999 movie Entrapment, although the sign was changed to that of Pudu.

== Transportation ==
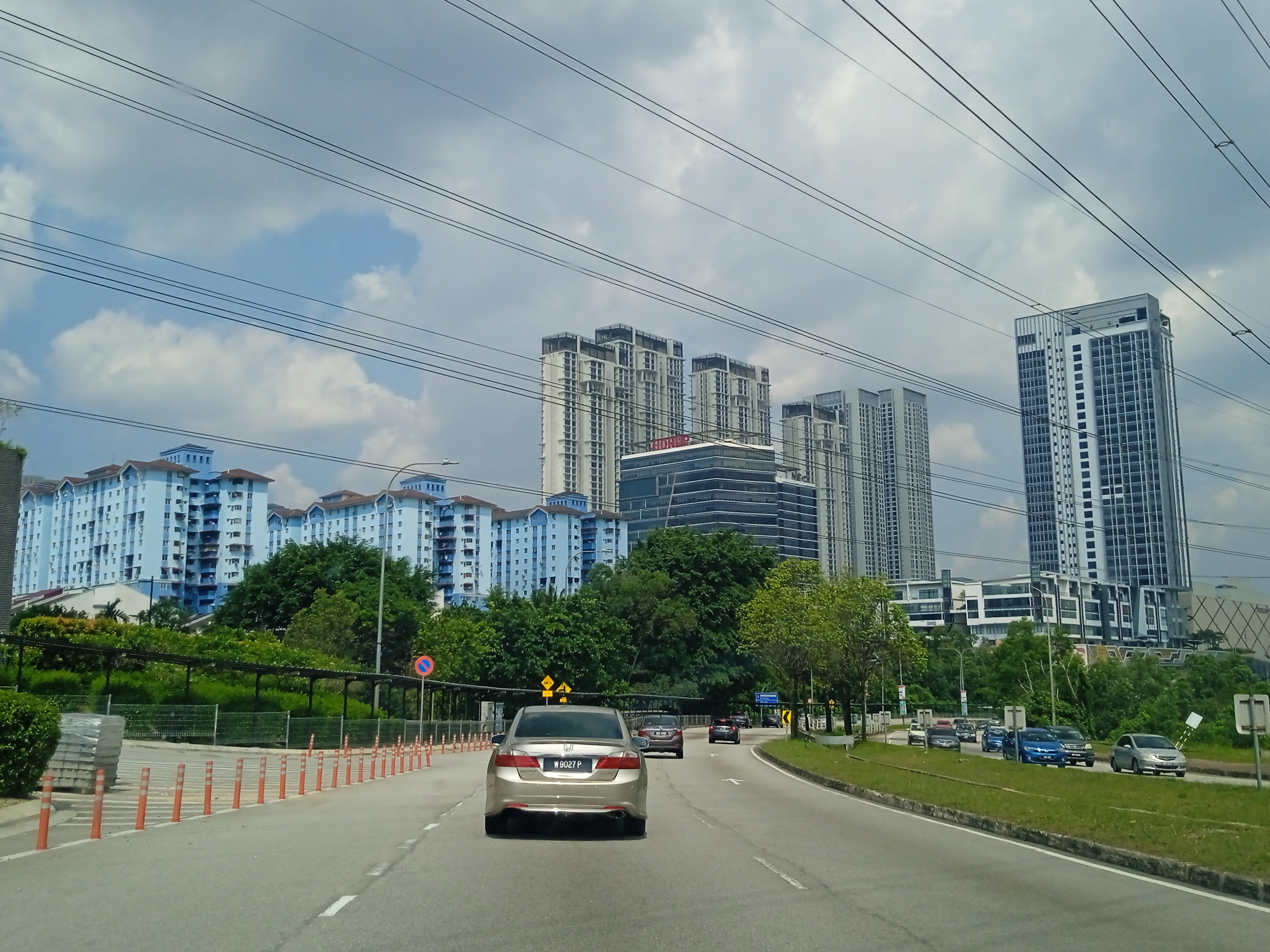
FT 217 eastbound at Bukit Jalil

Bukit Jalil has strategic connections to other parts of Klang Valley via the Damansara–Puchong Expressway (LDP) and Bukit Jalil Highway. It is also accessible via the KESAS Highway, Maju Expressway, MEX Highway and New Pantai Expressway (NPE). It is served by the Bukit Jalil, Sri Petaling, and Awan Besar stations on the Sri Petaling LRT line.

== Education ==
Several educational institutions are located at Bukit Jalil, such as the International Medical University (IMU), Technology Park Malaysia (TPM), the Asia Pacific Institute of Information Technology (APIIT), the Asia Pacific University of Technology & Innovation (APU) and Bukit Jalil National Secondary School.

== Malls ==
- Pavilion Bukit Jalil
- Aurora Place Bukit Jalil

== Residential ==
There are many high-rise apartments and high-end condominiums situated around Bukit Jalil.

- Arena Green
- Bukit OUG Condominium
- Casa Green
- Covillea Residence
- Denai Sutera
- Greenfields
- Green Avenue
- Impiana Sky
- Jalil Damai
- Kiara Residence 1&2
- KM1 East and West
- Lanai Residence
- LTAT Apartments
- Mercu Jalil
- Paraiso Residence
- Parkhill Residence
- PPA1M Bukit Jalil
- Residensi Bukit Jalil
- Residensi Bintang
- Residensi Jalilmas
- Savanna Residence 1&2
- Skyluxe Residence
- The Como
- The Havre
- The Link 2
- The Park Sky Residence (Pavilion)
- The Park 2 (Pavilion)
- The Rainz
- The Treez
- The Tropika
- Twin Arkz
- Vista Commonwealth
- Z Residence

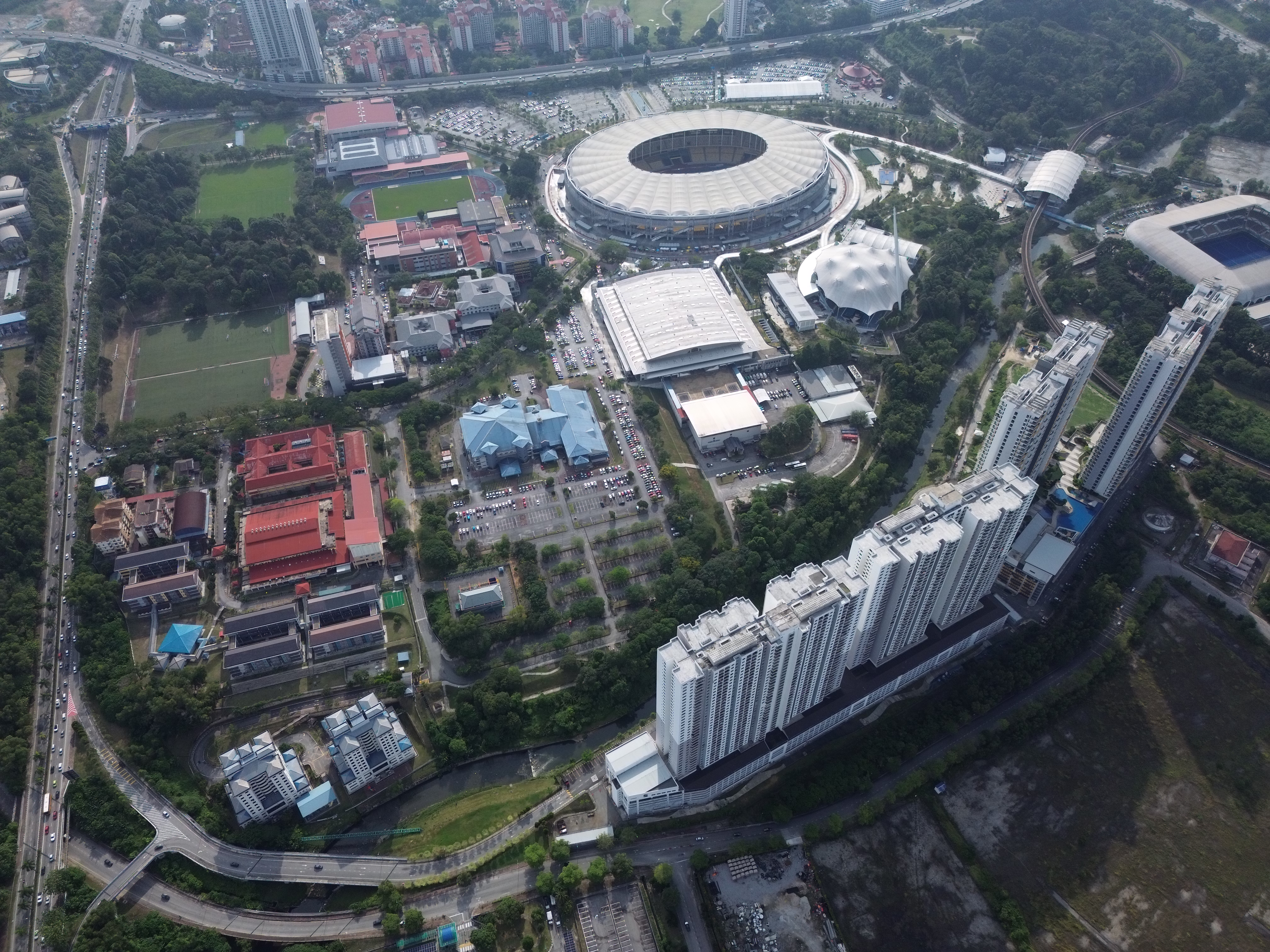
Stadium Nasional Bukit Jalil, aerial photo

Landed properties in Bukit Jalil are Alam Sutera, Bukit Jalil Golf & Country Resort, Esplanade, Jalil Sutera, and Sri Jalil.

== See also ==
- Sri Petaling LRT station
- Bukit Jalil LRT station
- Awan Besar LRT station
