= Bukit Jalil Highway =

Road in Malaysia

Federal Route 217
- Bukit Jalil Highway (Puchong–Sungai Besi Highway)
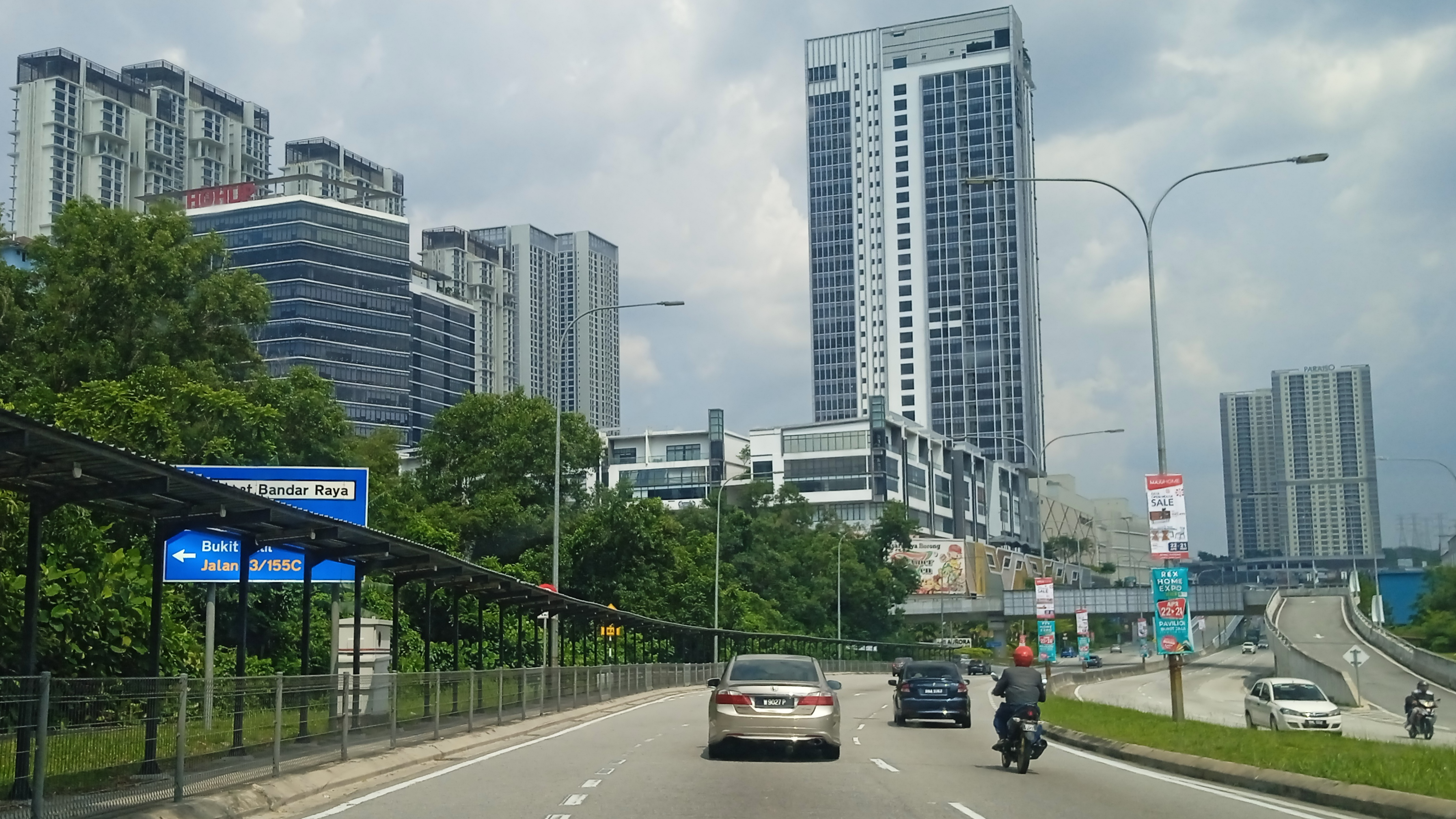

Route information
- Maintained by Malaysian Public Works Department
- Length: 4.30 km (2.67 mi)
- Existed: 1995–present
- History: Completed in 1997

Major junctions
- West end: Puchong
- Damansara–Puchong Expressway; B11 Jalan Puchong–Petaling Jaya; Kuala Lumpur–Seremban Expressway; Sungai Besi Expressway
- East end: Sungai Besi

Location
- Country: Malaysia
- Primary destinations: Bandar Kinrara, Kompleks Sukan Negara, Technology Park Malaysia, Bukit Jalil, Puncak Jalil

Highway system
- Highways in Malaysia; Expressways; Federal; State

The Bukit Jalil Highway, or Puchong–Sungai Besi Highway, Federal Route 217, is a major highway in Klang Valley, Malaysia. It is a toll-free and also a second highway after Shah Alam Expressway E5. It connects the Sungai Besi Expressway E9 near Selangor Turf Club in the east to Damansara–Puchong Expressway E11 near Puchong Jaya in the west. The highway passes Bandar Kinrara and Bukit Jalil.

The Kilometre Zero of the highway starts at Puchong Jaya Interchange near Puchong, Selangor. The Kilometre Zero monument is erected near Pos Malaysia Deliver Branch at Puchong Town Centre in Puchong.

== History ==
During 1998 Commonwealth Games in Kuala Lumpur, the highway became a second main route to National Sports Complex in Bukit Jalil after Shah Alam Expressway. In 2004, the highway was gazetted as a Federal Route 217.

At most sections, the Federal Route 217 was built under the JKR R5 road standard, allowing maximum speed limit of up to 90 km/h.

== Interchange lists ==
Legend:

- I/C - Interchange, I/S - Intersection, RSA - Rest and service area, OBR - Overhead bridge restaurant, R/R - Restaurant and rest plaza, L/B - Layby, V/P - Vista point, TN - tunnel, T/P - Toll plaza, BR - Bridge
- C - Cloverleaf, S - Stack, T-A - Trumpet-A, T-B - Trumpet-B, DT - Directional-T/Y, SDT - Semi-Directional-T/Y, P-Y - Partial-Y, D - Diamond, P-C - Partial cloverleaf, D-D - Diverging diamond, D-R - Direct ramp

State/territory	District	Location	km	mi	Exit	Name	Destinations	Notes
Selangor	Petaling	Puchong	0.0	0.0	21701	Puchong Jaya I/C	B11 Jalan Puchong–Petaling Jaya – Jalan Klang Lama; Kuchai Lama; Petaling Jaya; Damansara–Puchong Expressway – Kepong, Damansara, Petaling Jaya, Bandar Sunway, Shah Alam, Klang, Pulau Indah, Puchong, Putrajaya, Cyberjaya, Kuala Lumpur International Airport (KLIA)	Multi-level stacked interchange
Selangor	Petaling	Puchong			21702	Persiaran Puchong Jaya Selatan Exit	Persiaran Puchong Jaya Selatan	T-junctions
Selangor	Petaling	Bandar Kinrara			21703	Kinrara Industrial Park Exit	Kinrara Industrial Park	T-junctions
Selangor	Petaling	Bandar Kinrara			21704	Jalan Kinrara 4 Exit	Jalan Kinrara 4	T-junctions
Selangor	Petaling	Bandar Kinrara			21705	Jalan Kinrara 5 I/S	Jalan Kinrara 5	Directional-T interchange
Selangor	Petaling	Bandar Kinrara			21706	Bandar Kinrara I/C	Jalan Kinrara 1/B11 Jalan Puchong–Petaling Jaya – Taman Kinrara, Petaling Jaya, Taman Damai Utama, Puncak Jalil, Kinrara Golf Club	Half-diamond interchange
Selangor	Petaling	Bandar Kinrara			21707	Jalan BK 1/20 Exit	Jalan BK 1/20	Eastbound
Selangor	Petaling	Bandar Kinrara				Kinrara BK5 LRT station	Kinrara BK5 LRT station 4	
Kuala Lumpur	N/A	Bukit Jalil			21707A	Jalan 13/155C Exit	Jalan 13/155C	Eastbound
Kuala Lumpur	N/A	Bukit Jalil			21708	Jalan Bukit Jalil Indah 2 I/S	Jalan Bukit Jalil Indah 2 – Alam Sutera, Taman Impian Indah	T-junctions
Kuala Lumpur	N/A	Bukit Jalil			21709	Puncak Jalil I/S	Persiaran Puncak Jalil – Puncak Jalil	T-junctions
Kuala Lumpur	N/A	Bukit Jalil			21710	Bukit Jalil I/C	Jalan Jalil Perkasa 1 – Awan Besar, Bukit Jalil Recreational Park, Bukit Jalil Golf and Country Club, Asian Football Confederation (AFC) main headquarters Maju Expressway – Kuala Lumpur (Jalan Tun Razak), Kampung Pandan	T-junctions
Kuala Lumpur	N/A	Bukit Jalil			Petronas and Shell L/B (westbound) – Petronas and Shell			
Kuala Lumpur	N/A	Bukit Jalil			21711	TPM I/C	Jalan Kompleks Sukan – KL Sports City, Sri Petaling, Technology Park Malaysia; Maju Expressway – Putrajaya, Cyberjaya, Kuala Lumpur International Airport (KLIA)	Diamond interchange
Kuala Lumpur	N/A	Bukit Jalil			21712	KL Sports City Exit	KL Sports City (National Sports Complex) – National Stadium, Axiata Arena, National Sports Council, National Sports Institute, Bukit Jalil Sports School	Eastbound
Kuala Lumpur	N/A	Bukit Jalil			Bridge			
Kuala Lumpur	N/A	Bukit Jalil				ITS Main Headquarters and Traffic Operation Centre	Intelligent transportation system (ITS/ITIS) Main Headquarters and Traffic Operation Centre	Westbound
Kuala Lumpur	N/A	Bukit Jalil			21713	Taman Perindustrian Bukit Serdang Exit	Jalan PBS 14/1 – Taman Perindustrian Bukit Serdang	Westbound
Kuala Lumpur	N/A	Bukit Jalil			Sungai Kuyoh Bridge			
Kuala Lumpur	N/A	Bukit Jalil				ASTRO	All Asia Broadcast Centre (ASTRO)	Eastbound
Kuala Lumpur	N/A	Bukit Jalil			21714	Astro-TPM I/C	Kuala Lumpur–Seremban Expressway – Kuala Lumpur, Petaling Jaya; North–South Expressway Southern Route / AH2 – Kuala Lumpur International Airport (KLIA), Seremban, Malacca, Johor Bahru	Parcelo expressway interchange
Kuala Lumpur	N/A	Bukit Jalil			Railway crossing and expressway bridge			
Kuala Lumpur	N/A	Bukit Jalil			21715	Selangor Turf Club I/C	Selangor Turf Club; Sungai Besi Expressway – Kuantan, Ulu Klang, Ampang, Kuala Lumpur, Sungai Besi, Mines Resort City, Seri Kembangan, Balakong, Kajang	Roundabout
1.000 mi = 1.609 km; 1.000 km = 0.621 mi: Incomplete access

== Gallery ==
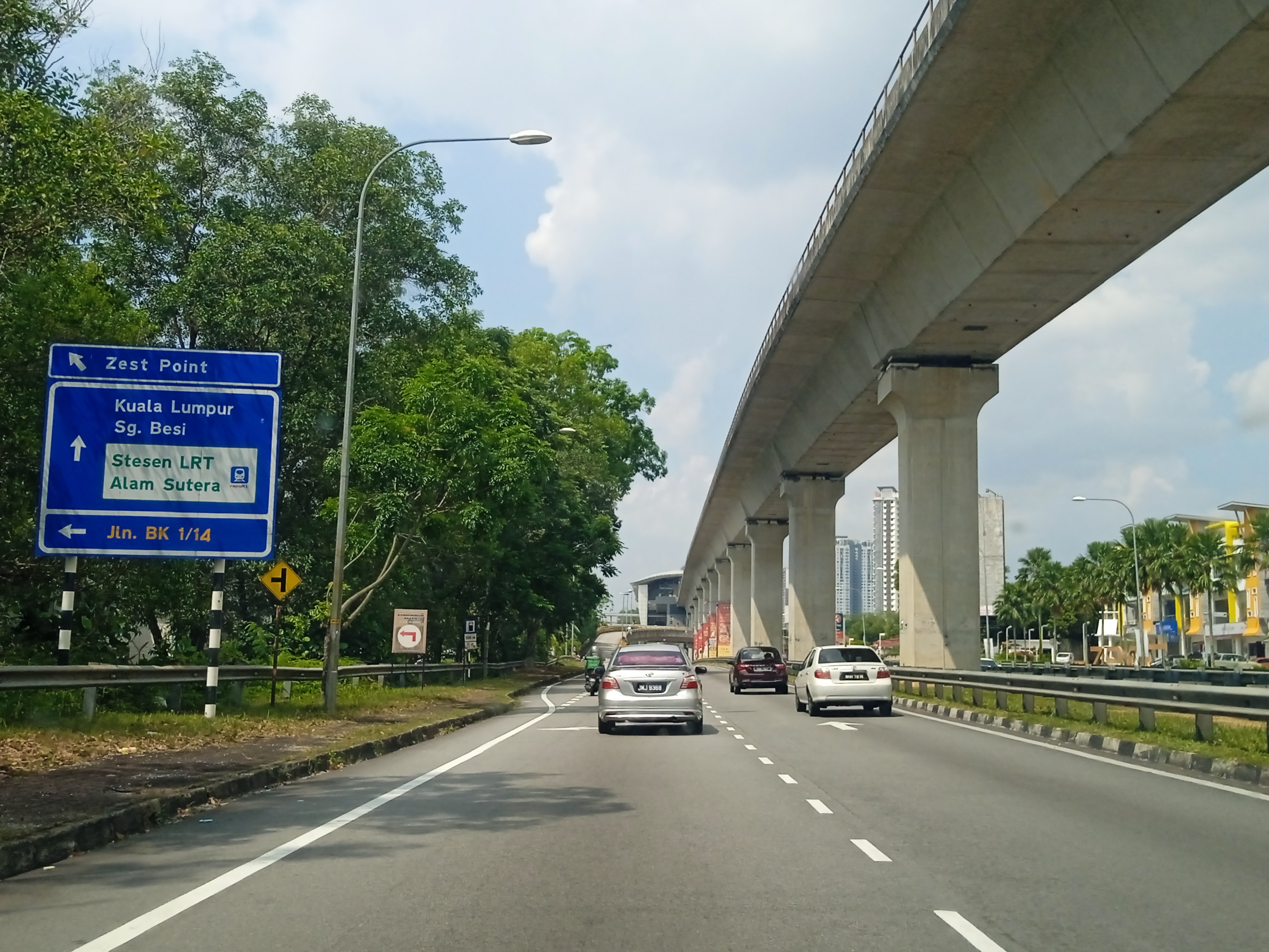
FT 217 section in Bandar Kinrara

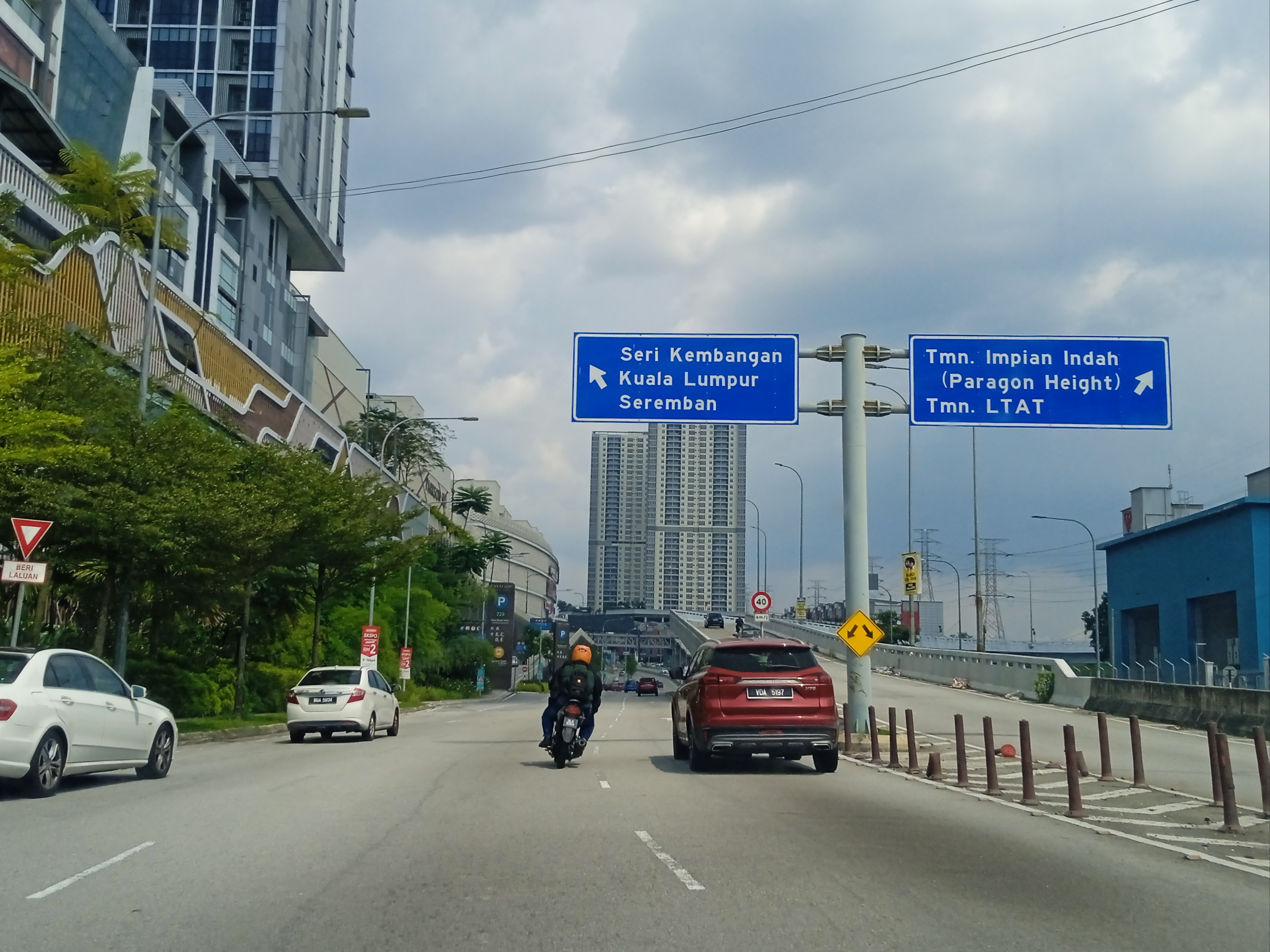
FT 217 section in Bukit Jalil

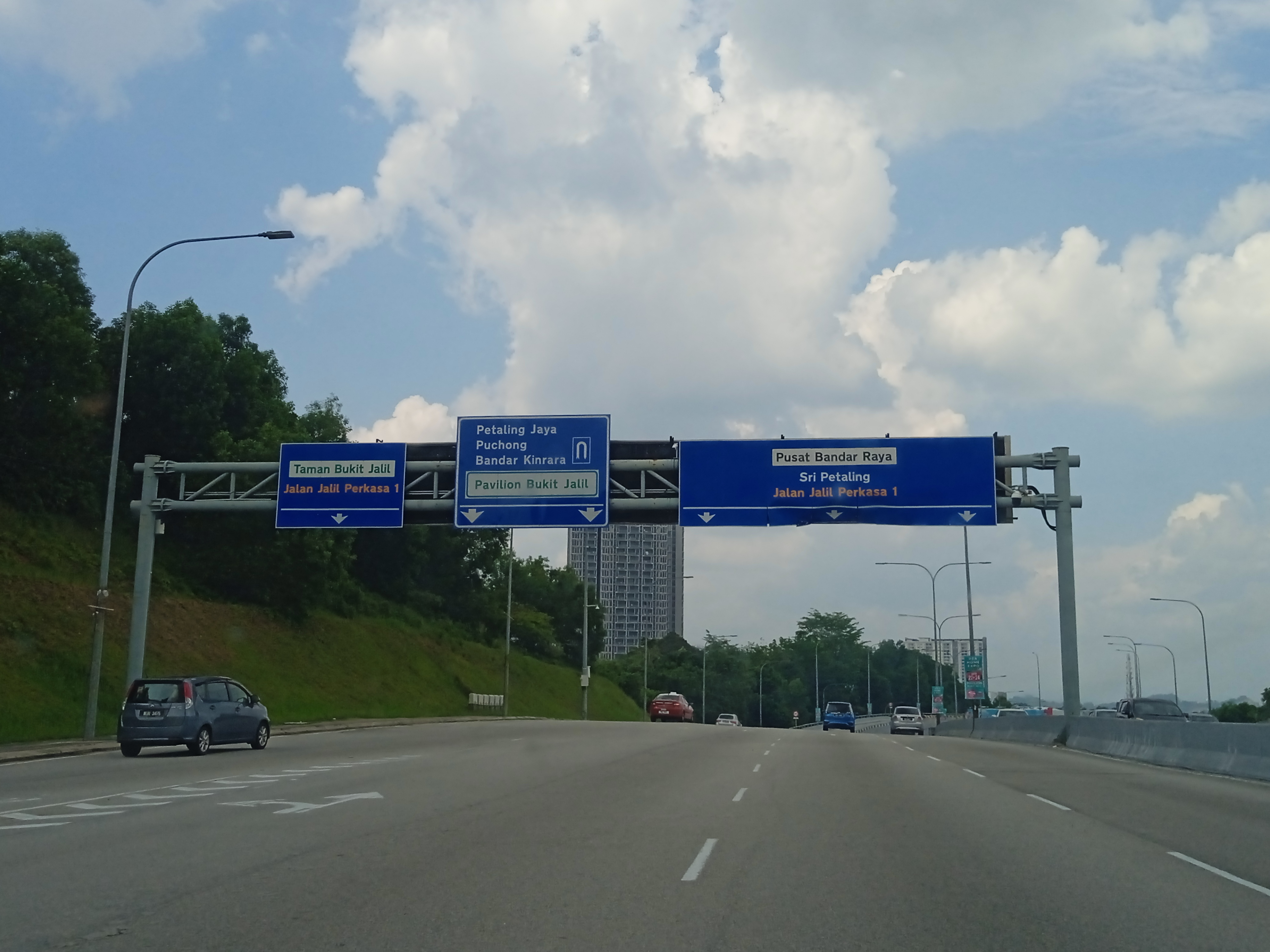
FT 217 section in TPM

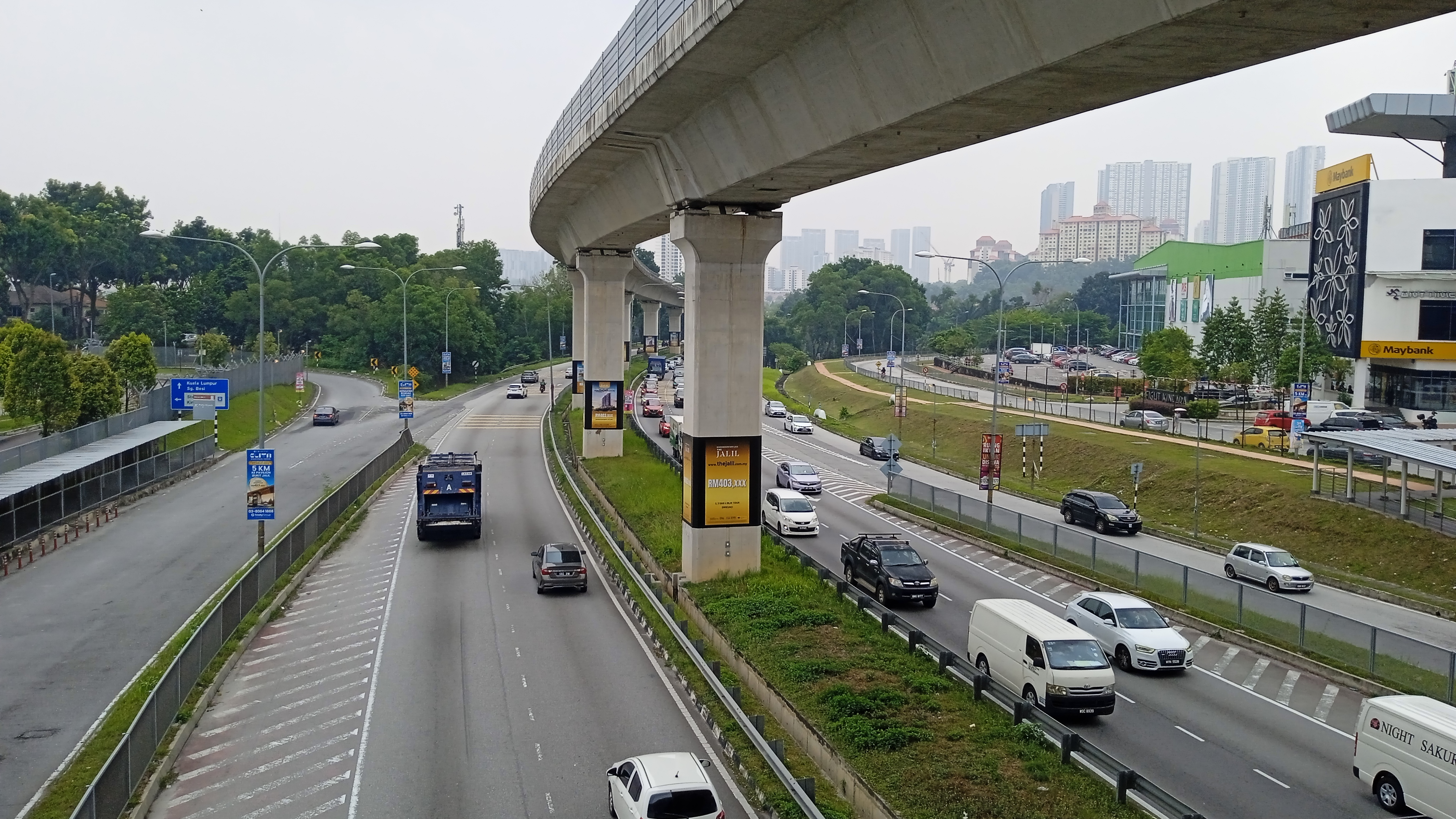
FT 217 towards eastward at Bandar Kinrara
