= Pavilion Bukit Jalil =

Shopping mall in Bukit Jalil, Kuala Lumpur, Malaysia

- Pavilion 2
- Main entrance of the mall
- Coordinates: 3.05042°N 101.67101°E
- Address: 2, Persiaran Jalil 8, Bandar Bukit Jalil, 57000 Kuala Lumpur, Malaysia
- Opened: 3 December 2021
- Developer: Malton Berhad
- Manager: Pavilion Real Estate Investment Trust
- Owner: Regal Path Sdn Bhd (formerly); MTrustee Berhad for Pavilion REIT (current)
- Num. of anchor tenants: 26
- Floor area: 1,800,000 sq ft (170,000 m^{2})
- Floors: 5 (mall), 2 (basement carpark)
- Parking: 4,717
- Public transit: SP19 Awan Besar LRT Station (via shuttle bus)
- Website: www.pavilion-bukitjalil.com

Pavilion Bukit Jalil, also known as Pavilion BJ or colloquially known as Pavilion 2, is a shopping mall in the affluent suburb of Bukit Jalil located to the south of Kuala Lumpur, Malaysia.

== Overview ==
It is the second mall under the "Pavilion" brand, following the concept of its Pavilion Kuala Lumpur mall in Bukit Bintang. Pavilion Bukit Jalil is part of the 50-acre Bukit Jalil City integrated development which begun development by Malton Berhad in 2015. The surrounding area of the mall also includes apartments, residential and commercial shops.

In 2019, Malton sold 49 percent stake of the still-under construction mall to Qatar Investment Authority for RM 1.3 billion to raise funds to continue the development of the project. The mall was completed and opened to the public on 3 December 2021. Since December 2021, discussions were held to sell the mall to Pavilion REIT. An agreement was reached in November 2022 for Pavilion REIT to acquire the mall from Regal Path Sdn Bhd, a wholly owned subsidiary of Malton, at RM 2.2 billion of which had gained shareholders' approval on 23 March 2023.

Pavilion Bukit Jalil houses the first Japanese bookstore chain Tsutaya Books in Southeast Asia. The bookstore was opened on 7 July 2022, taking up 31,000 square feet of space at Level 2 of the mall's orange zone. The mall also housed Malaysia's first international premium supermarket branch, The Food Merchant, located at Level 1 Orange zone.

== Mall zones ==
=== Pink and Orange Zones ===
Pavilion Bukit Jalil is separated into two sections across five levels, Pink Zone and Orange Zone. The mall has nine entrances to either one of the zones located on Levels 2 and 3 along with a linked bridge connecting the recreational park and the mall on Level 5.

=== Tokyo Town ===
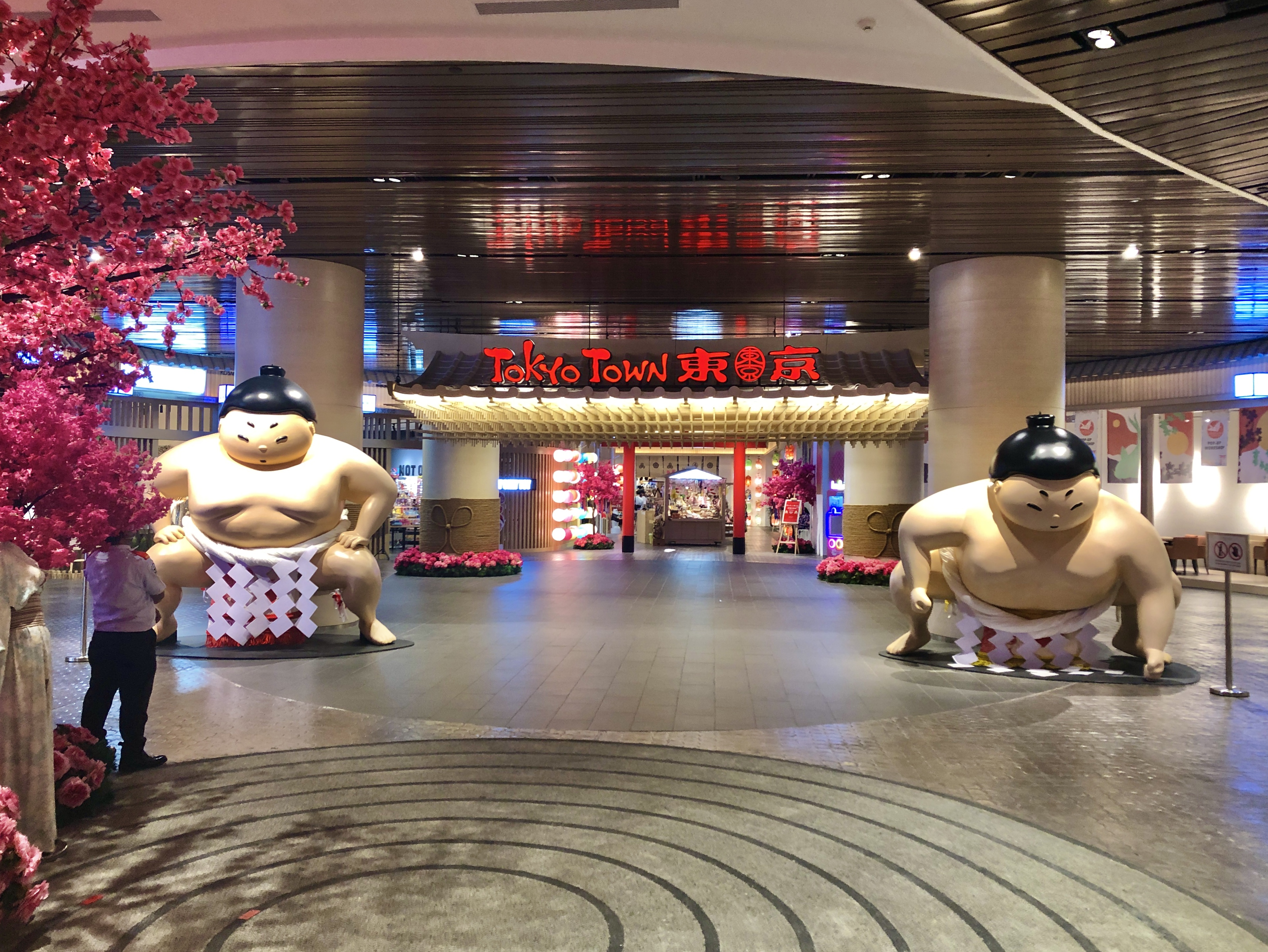
Entrance to the Tokyo Town are greeted by two sumo wrestlers

Located on the end of Level 2's orange zone is Tokyo Town, a 60,000 square feet precinct dedicated to Japanese-themed restaurants, kiosks and stores. It follows a similar concept with the Tokyo Street in Pavilion KL.

== Events ==
=== 2022 ===
A PUBG Mobile Esports event, known as the PUBG MOBILE Pro League - Southeast Asia Championship Spring 2022 (simply known as 2022 PMPL SEA Championship Spring) was hosted at the Exhibition Centre across 3 days from June 10th to 12th. It was the first PUBG Mobile Esports event worldwide that was fully hosted as LAN (offline/on-ground) since the COVID-19 pandemic in 2020.

=== 2024 ===
The Pokémon Run Malaysia 2024 was a festival that took place at Pavilion Bukit Jalil, spanning a total of 4 days from November 7 to November 10, with the Pokémon Run event happening on the final day.

=== 2026 ===
In collaboration with the Japan Graduates’ Association of Malaysia (Jagam) and the support of the Embassy of Japan in Malaysia, a month-long campaign titled “Konnichiwa Japan — Together, Here” was held from July 31 to Aug 2 at Pavilion Bukit Jalil to promote Japanese culture through cultural performances, workshops, Japanese food, traditional games and cosplay activities.

== Event spaces ==
- Centre Court
- PIAZZA
- Pavilion Bukit Jalil Exhibition Centre

== Accessibility ==
Pavilion Bukit Jalil is connected to the SP19 Awan Besar LRT station through the free shuttle bus service with 40-minute intervals.

There are 5 carpark entrances (A, B, C, D and E) around the mall which leads to the basement parking lot.

== Gallery ==
Centre Court of the mall features a similar design as Pavilion KL

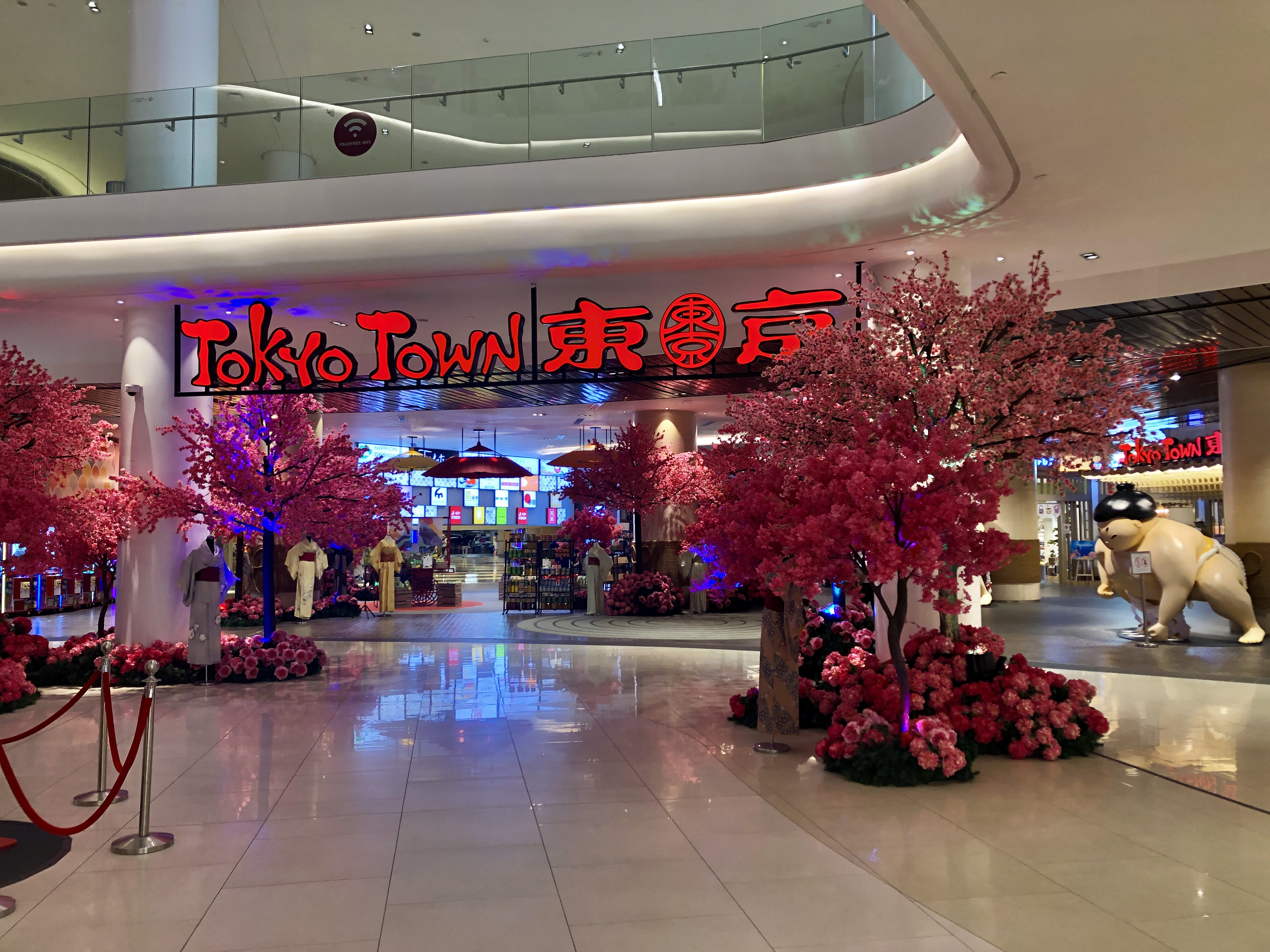
The Tokyo Town precinct

Inside of Tokyo Town

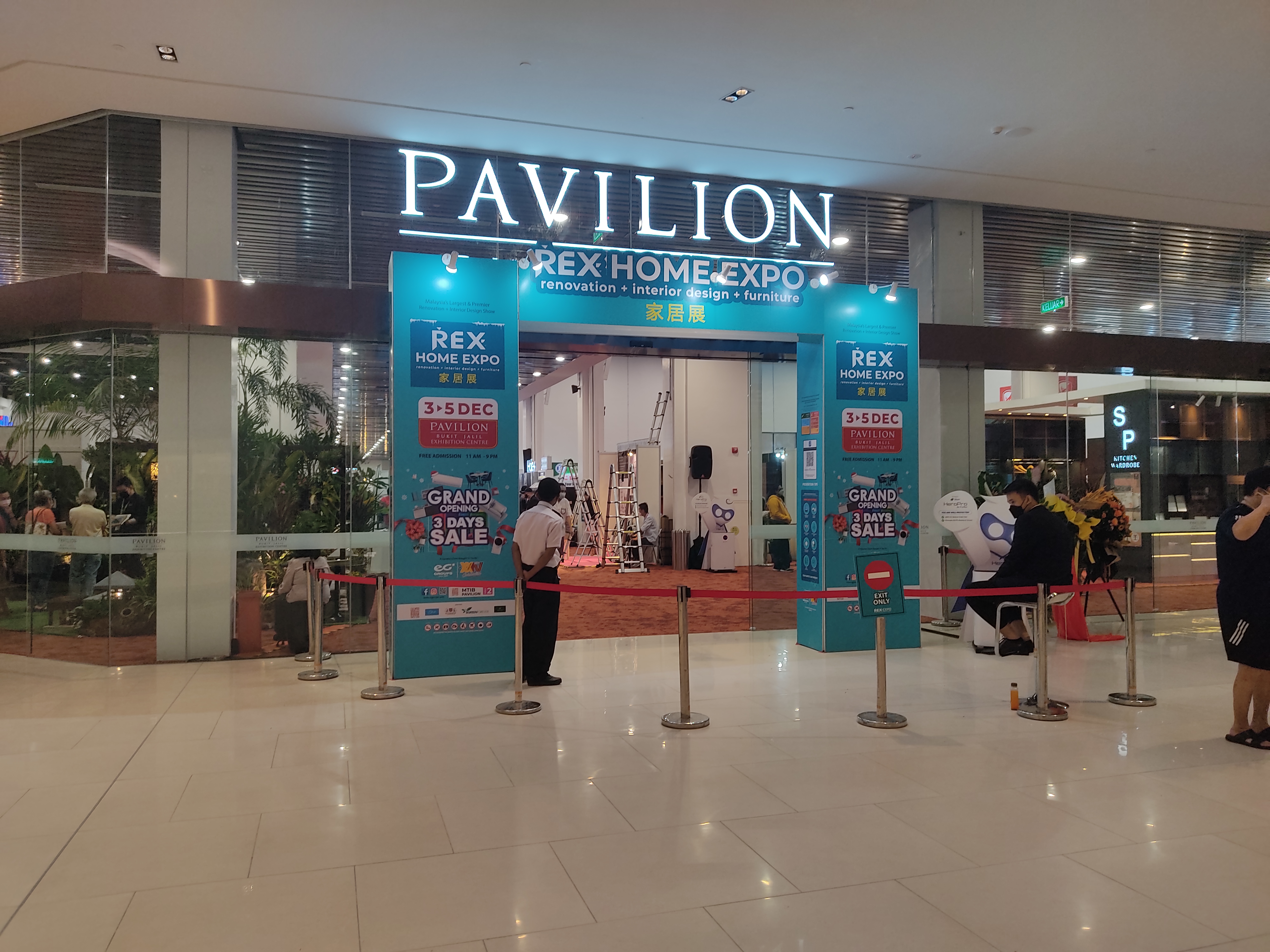
Pavilion Bukit Jalil Exhibition Centre

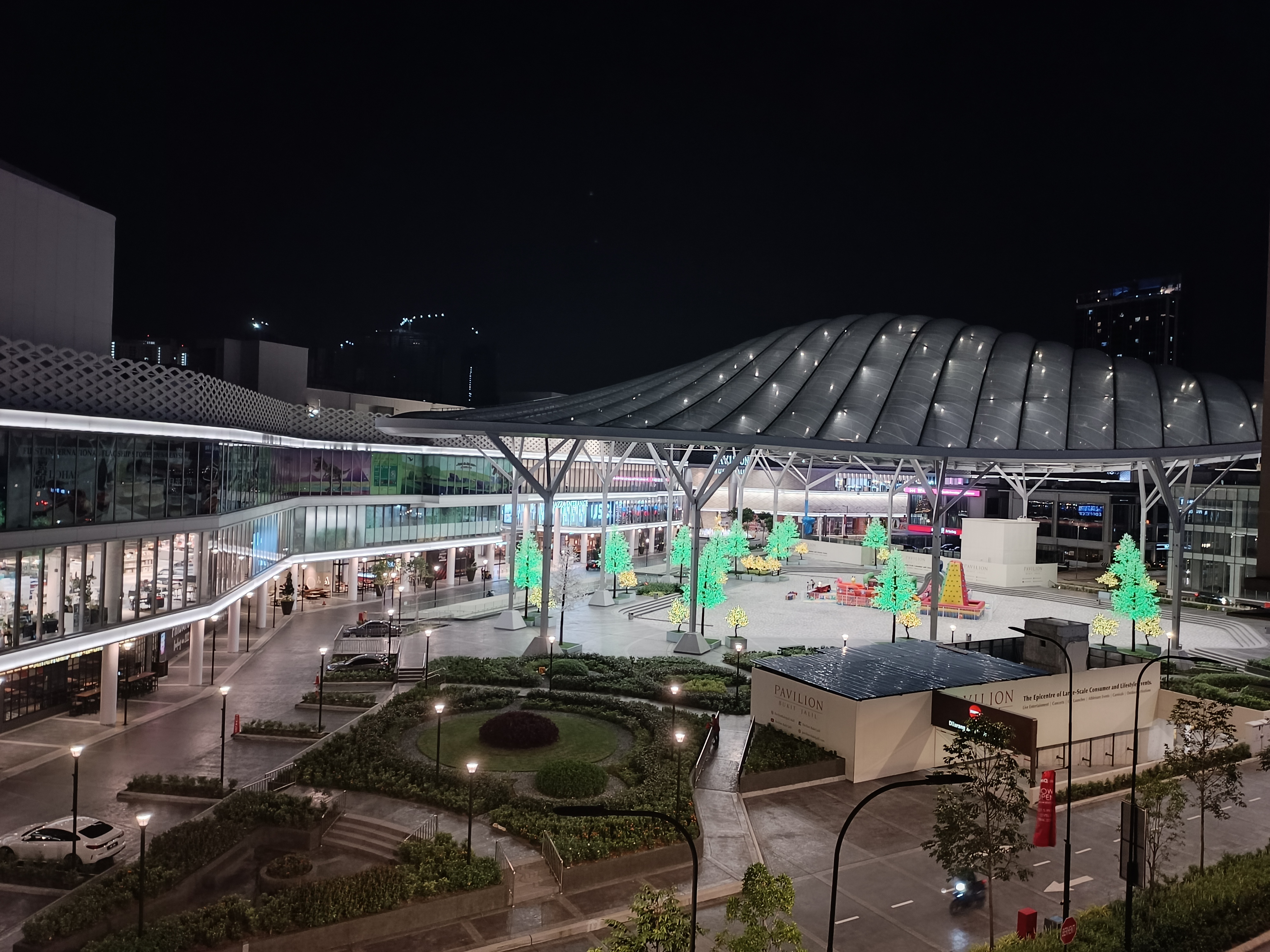
The Piazza event space at night

Tsutaya Books at Pavilion Bukit Jalil

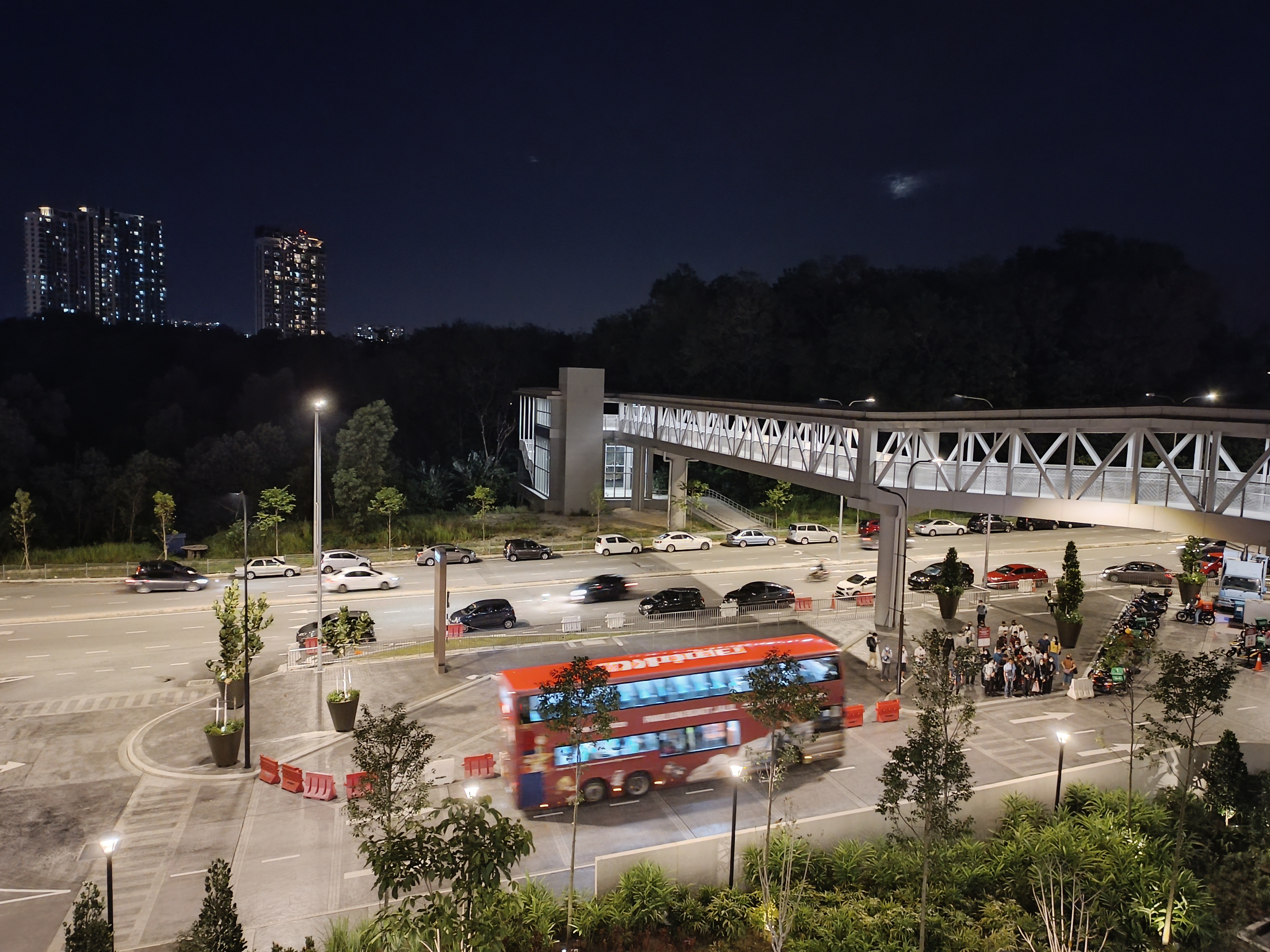
Pavilion shuttle service bus stop next to the Park Entrance

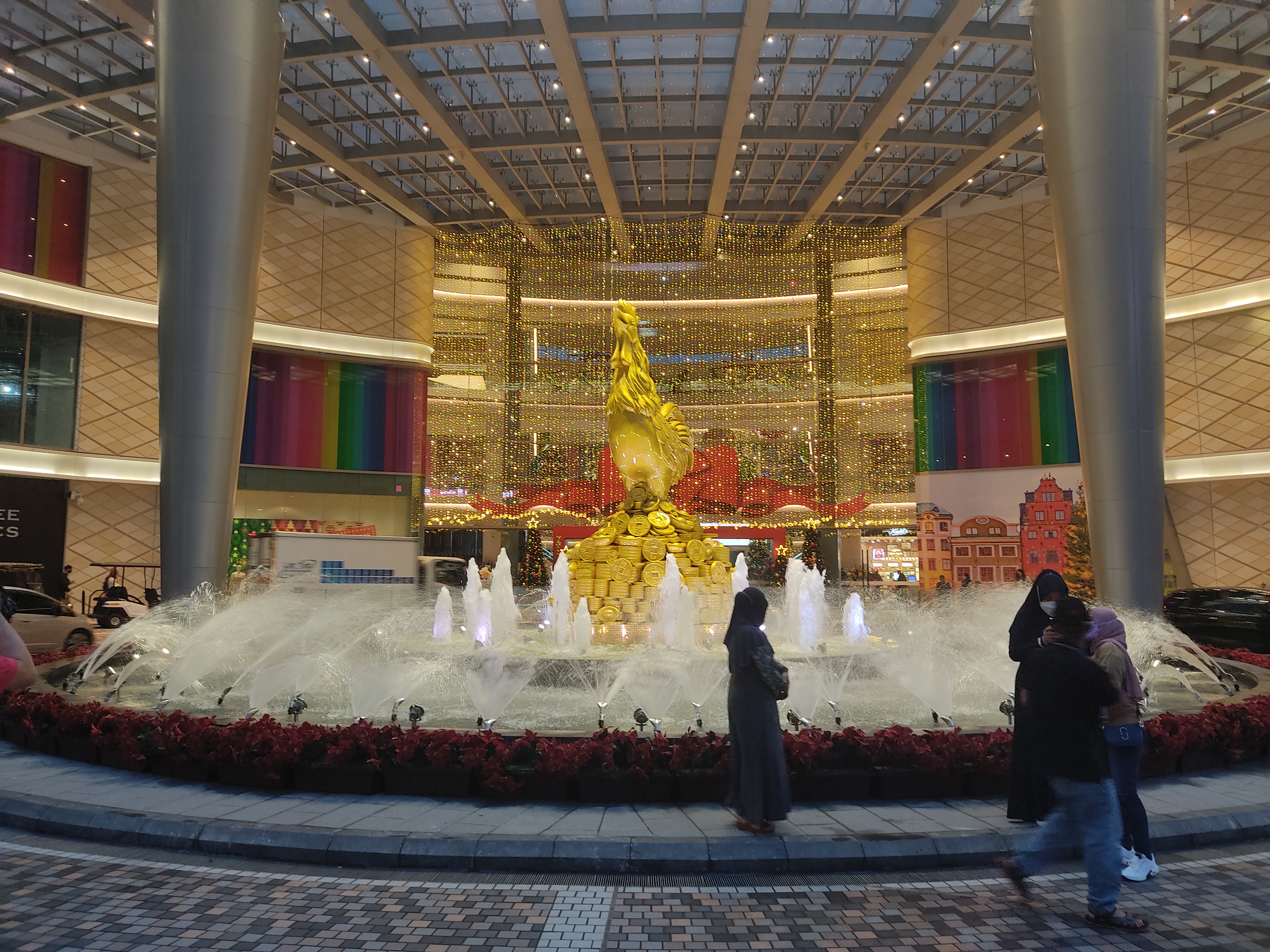
The Golden Rooster fountain from the main entrance

== See also ==
- List of convention and exhibition centers
- List of shopping malls in Malaysia
- Pavilion KL
- Pavilion Damansara Heights
