= Bukit Jalil LRT station =

Metro station in Kuala Lumpur, Malaysia

SP17 Bukit Jalil

General information
- Other names: Malay: بوکيت جليل (Jawi); Chinese: 武吉加里尔; Tamil: புக்கிட் ஜாலில்
- Location: Jalan Merah Caga, Bukit Jalil; Kuala Lumpur; Malaysia
- Coordinates: 3°3′29″N 101°41′31″E
- System: Rapid KL
- Owner: Prasarana Malaysia
- Operator: Rapid Rail
- Line: 4 Sri Petaling Line
- Platforms: 2 side platforms
- Tracks: 2

Construction
- Structure type: Elevated
- Parking: Not available

Other information
- Station code: SP17

History
- Opened: 11 July 1998; 28 years ago
- Former names: Sukan Negara

Services
Preceding station		Following station
Sungai Besi towards Sentul Timur	Sri Petaling Line	Sri Petaling towards Putra Heights
Route map
Location

The Bukit Jalil LRT station is a light rapid transit (LRT) station in Bukit Jalil, Kuala Lumpur, Malaysia.

It is operated under Rapid KL's LRT Sri Petaling Line (formerly known as STAR LRT line). This station is used by many sports fans and concert-goers due to its proximity to the KL Sports City (formerly known as the Bukit Jalil National Sports Complex). This station opens at 6:00 am and closes at 11:59 pm daily, although during major sports and concert events, its operating hours are extended until 2:00 am.

== Location ==
Bukit Jalil LRT station is located after Sungai Besi and before the former terminus of the Sri Petaling Line, Sri Petaling station.

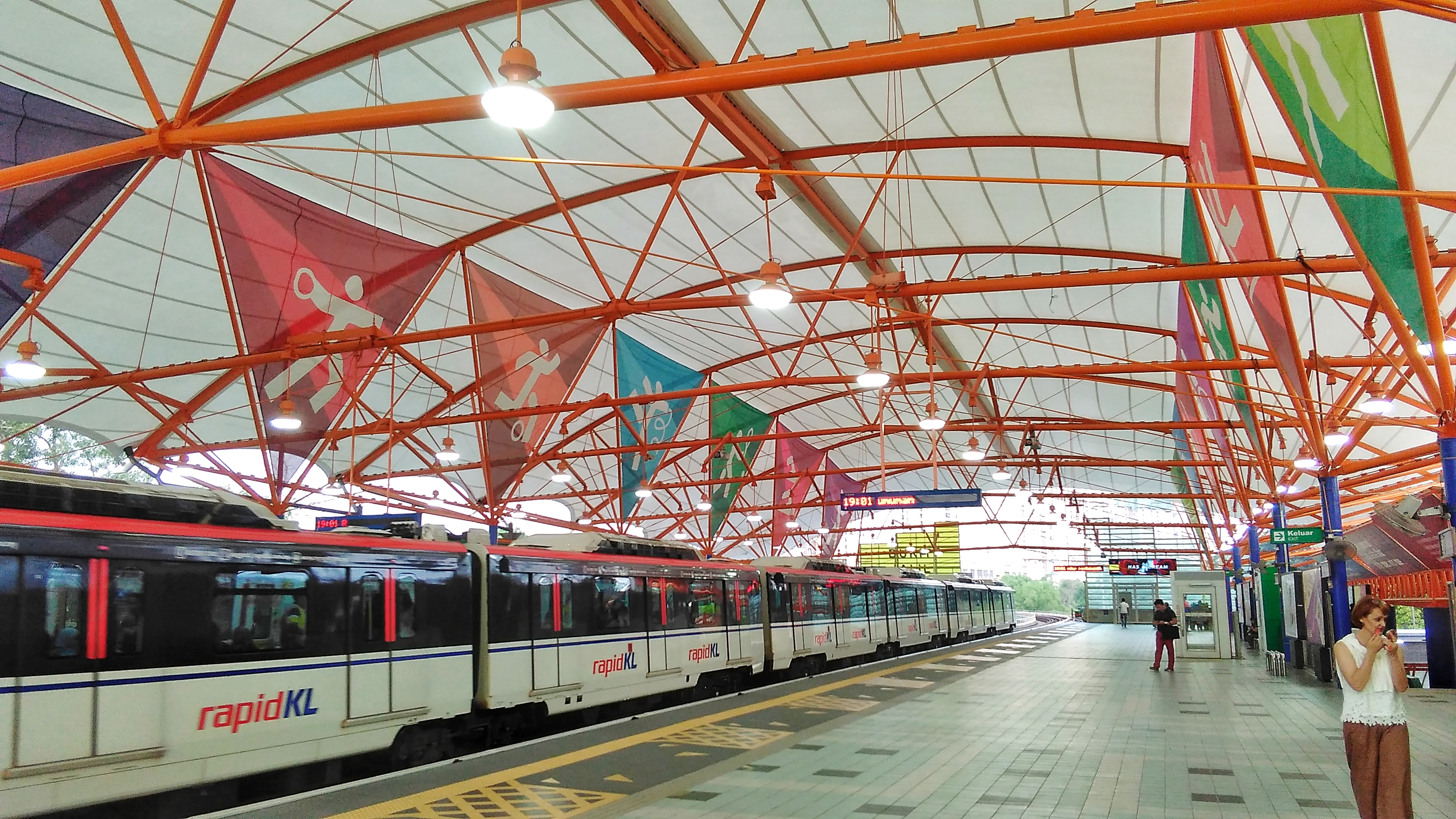
The roof of the station features colourful panels with sports symbolisms

The station is situated within the KL Sports City complex, providing easy access to commuters who visit the facilities in the complex. It is also the nearest station to Technology Park Malaysia (TPM), Malaysia's most advanced and comprehensive centre for research and development for knowledge-based industries.

== History ==
The station was opened on 11 July 1998, as part of Phase 2 of the former STAR LRT system operations. Under Phase 2, a 15 km track with 11 stations was built to serve the northern and southern areas of Kuala Lumpur. This station was also built to cater to passengers travelling between the Commonwealth Athlete's Village at Sri Petaling (then known as Komanwel station) and the National Sports Complex in Bukit Jalil during the 1998 Commonwealth Games. At that time, Bukit Jalil station was known as Sukan Negara station, named after the sports complex (Malay: Kompleks Sukan Negara; National Sports Complex).

== Design and layout ==
L1
L1	Side platform
L1	Platform 2:	4 Sri Petaling Line towards SP31 Putra Heights (→)
L1	Platform 1:	4 Sri Petaling Line towards AG1 SP1 Sentul Timur (←)
L1	Side platform
G	Concourse and Street Level	Faregates, ticketing machines, station control, exit to KL Sports City.

The staircase and the roof, amongst many other parts of the station, are decorated with inspirational quotes

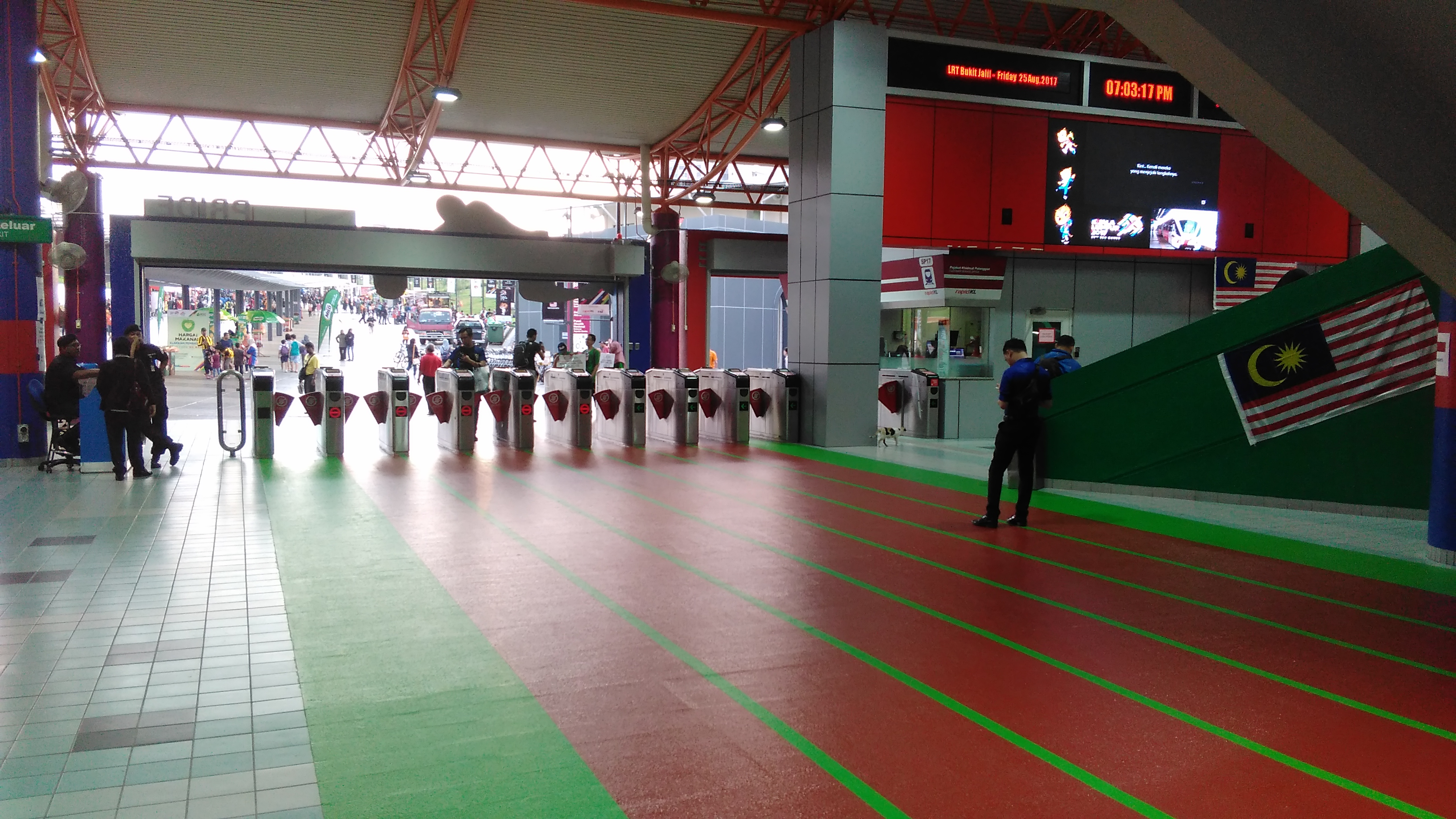
A 'relay track' design towards the faregates

The LRT station is an elevated station similar to most stations on the Sri Petaling and Ampang Lines, albeit with some differences. The station has two levels that are linked by stairways and escalators. The platform level for the station, located on the topmost floor, consists of two sheltered side platforms along a double-tracked line. The platforms themselves are considerably larger than other stations along the line to cater for the high volume of commuters during sporting events and concerts held at the various stadiums in the sports complex. The lower level consists of a shared concourse containing the faregates, ticketing machines, and station control office. There is a large entrance that leads directly towards the sports complex.

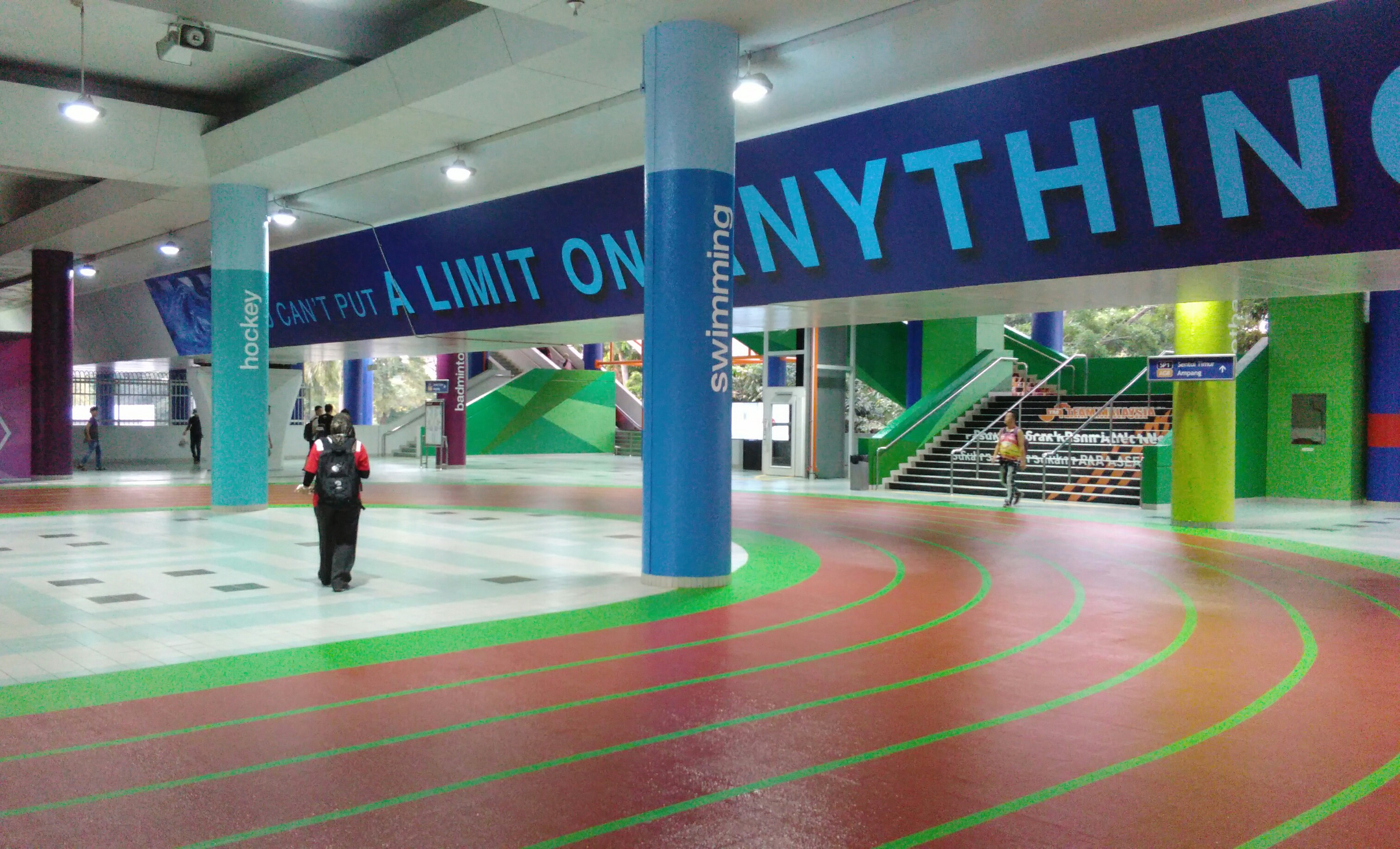
The concourse area of the station features sports-related quotes and the curve of the relay track. One can also see names of sports on the pillars

The station originally featured a similar design and ambience with other LRT stations, with roofs supported by latticed frames, and white plastered walls and pillars. It received a facelift in conjunction with the 2017 Southeast Asian Games (SEA Games) and the rebranding of the National Sports Complex as the KL Sports City, being revamped with a sporting theme. The revamp features colourful and vibrant graphics, sports symbolisms, and inspirational quotes installed inside and outside the station, such as on the walls and staircases. The floor itself is painted to emulate a relay track, with the faregates acting as the end/beginning of the painted track.

== Incidents and accidents ==
On September 24, 2008, two LRT trains collided about 200m from the station. A carriage of one of the trains involved in the accident hit the rear of the other train. Six passengers were injured in this accident.

== In popular culture ==
The Bukit Jalil LRT station was used as a filming location for the 1999 film Entrapment starring Sean Connery and Catherine Zeta-Jones. In the film, it was called Pudu station, which is actually another LRT station (though on the same line) in Kuala Lumpur.

== See also ==
- List of rail transit stations in Klang Valley
