= Awan Besar LRT station =

Metro station in Kuala Lumpur, Malaysia

SP19 Awan Besar
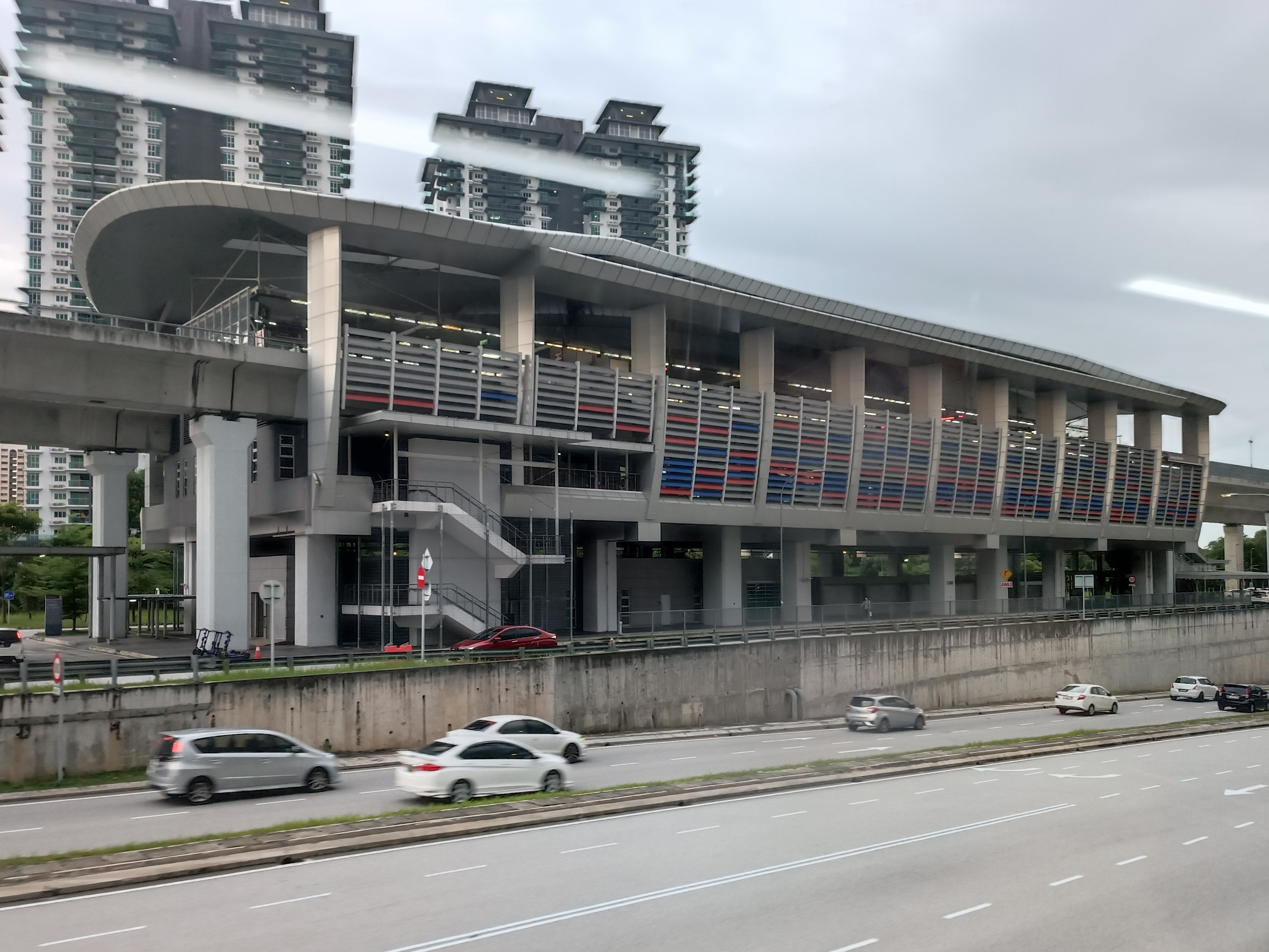
- Exterior of the station.

General information
- Other names: Malay: اون بسر (Jawi); Chinese: 阿旺柏沙; Tamil: அவான் பெசார்
- Location: Jalan Awan Besar, Bukit OUG; 57000 Kuala Lumpur; Malaysia
- Coordinates: 3.0621°N 101.6706°E
- System: Rapid KL
- Owner: Prasarana Malaysia
- Operator: Rapid Rail
- Line: 4 Sri Petaling Line
- Platforms: 1 island platform
- Tracks: 2

Construction
- Structure type: Elevated
- Parking: Available with payment. 193 total parking bays.

Other information
- Station code: SP19

History
- Opened: 31 October 2015; 10 years ago

Services
| Preceding station | | Following station |
|---|---|---|
| Sri Petaling towards Sentul Timur | Sri Petaling Line | Muhibbah towards Putra Heights |
Location

The Awan Besar LRT station is a light rapid transit (LRT) station in Bukit OUG, Kuala Lumpur, Malaysia. It is served by the LRT Sri Petaling Line. Like most other LRT stations operating in Klang Valley, this station is elevated.

Awan Besar station is also the nearest station to a Masonic Temple, also known as the Freemason Hall, and the Bukit OUG Condominium.

The LRT station is located after Sri Petaling station, the former terminus of the LRT Sri Petaling Line. It is the first station of the Sri Petaling Line extension project.

== Bus Services ==
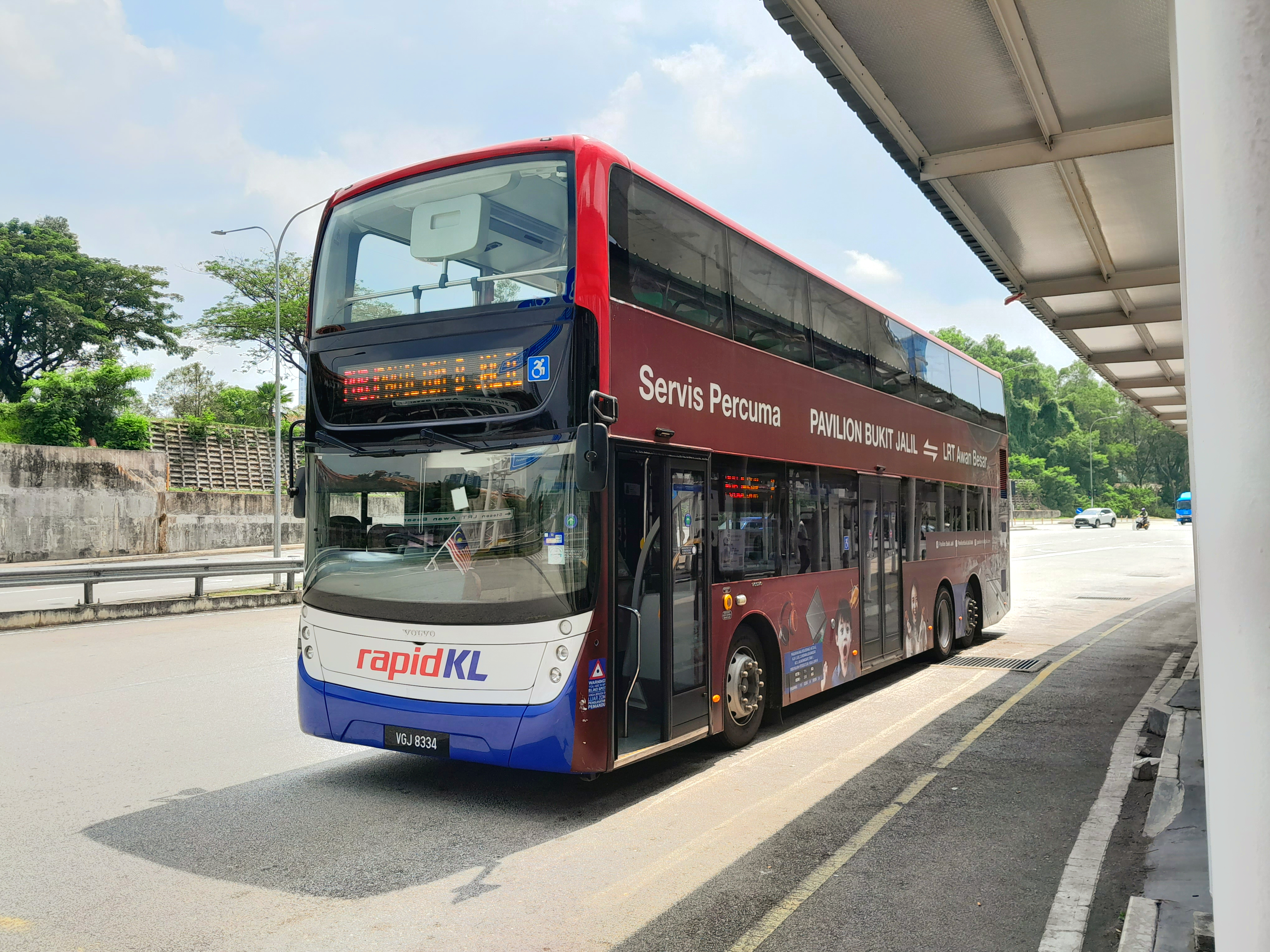
Pavilion Bukit Jalil Free Shuttle Service

There is a free shuttle bus between Pavilion Bukit Jalil and the station with 20-minute intervals. Awan Besar is also the terminus of the 651 bus (Pearl Point - LRT Muhhibah).

=== Bus Services ===
| Route No. | Origin | Destination | Via | Connecting to |
|---|---|---|---|---|
| 652 | SP19 Awan Besar | Mile 3, Jalan Klang Lama | Jalan Jalil Perkasa 7 Jalan Merah Caga (Sri Petaling); Jalan Mesra Ria; Jalan Riang 11 (Happy Garden) | 600, 640, 650, 651, T563, T582, T588, T589 |
| T580 | SP19 Awan Besar | SP17 Bukit Jalil; Technology Park Malaysia | Lebuhraya Bukit Jalil; Jalan Merah Caga (Sri Petaling); Jalan 1/149E; Jalan Inovasi 1 | 651, 652, T563, T582, T589 |

=== Shuttle Services ===
| Route No. | Origin | Destination | Via | Connecting to |
|---|---|---|---|---|
| PVBJ/PAVBJ | SP19 Awan Besar | Pavilion Bukit Jalil | Persiaran Bukit Jalil | N/A |

=== Rapid KL On-Demand ===
| Route No. | Origin | Destination | Via | Booking App |
|---|---|---|---|---|
| T651B | SP19 Awan Besar | PY27 Kuchai | Jalan Klang Lama | Trek Rides |
