= Muhibbah LRT station =

Metro station in Kuala Lumpur, Malaysia

Coordinates: 3°3′43.4″N 101°39′45.0″E

SP20 Muhibbah
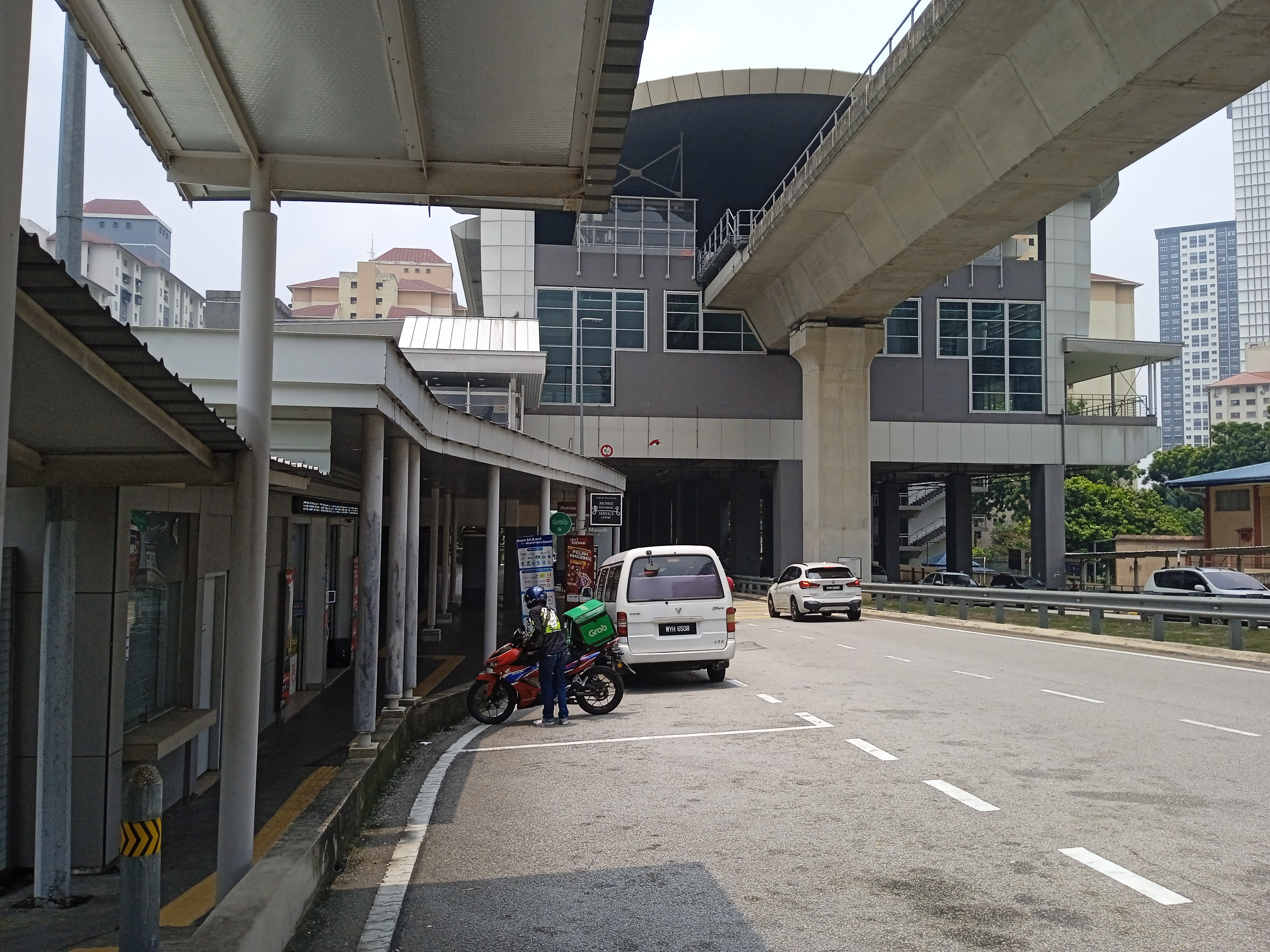

General information
- Other names: Malay: محبه (Jawi); Chinese: 亲善; Tamil: முகிபா
- Location: Jalan 4/155, Kampung Muhibbah; 58200 Kuala Lumpur; Malaysia
- System: Rapid KL
- Owner: Prasarana Malaysia
- Operator: Rapid Rail
- Line: 4 Sri Petaling Line
- Platforms: 2 side platforms
- Tracks: 2

Construction
- Structure type: Elevated
- Parking: Available with payment; 230 total parking bays
- Cycle facilities: Available

Other information
- Station code: SP20

History
- Opened: 31 October 2015; 10 years ago

Services
| Preceding station | | Following station |
|---|---|---|
| Awan Besar towards Sentul Timur | Sri Petaling Line | Alam Sutera towards Putra Heights |
Location

The Muhibbah LRT station is a light rapid transit (LRT) station at Kampung Muhibbah, a village about 21 km south of the city centre of Kuala Lumpur, the capital of Malaysia.

Muhibbah station is the dedicated station for PPR Kampung Muhibbah and Parklane OUG Service Apartments. It is possible to walk from the station to the next station, Awan Besar, a mere 900 metres away.

It is served by the LRT Sri Petaling Line. Like most other LRT stations operating in the Klang Valley, this station is elevated.

== Design and layout ==
L2
| L2 | Side platform, doors will open on the left |
| L2 | Platform 2 | 4 Sri Petaling Line towards SP31 Putra Heights (→) |
| L2 | Platform 1 | 4 Sri Petaling Line towards AG1 SP1 Sentul Timur (←) |
| L2 | Side platform, doors will open on the left |
| L1 | Concourse | Faregates, ticketing machines, station control, escalators and elevators to street levels and car park |
| G | Street level | Handicapped friendly ramp available. Street entrances are available from both directions of Jalan 4/155, PPR Kampung Muhibbah. |

== Bus services ==
| Route no. | Operator | Origin | Destination | Via | Frequency (minutes) | Operating hours | Note |
|---|---|---|---|---|---|---|---|
| 651 | Rapid KL | SP20 Muhibbah | Pearl Point | Awan Besar | 20 | 6.30 AM to 11.30 PM | Starting point, reverse direction will stop at SP19 Awan Besar |
| GOKL 14 | Go KL City Bus | Muhibbah Community Complex | PPR Pinggiran Bukit Jalil | SP20 Muhibbah; SP19 Awan Besar | 15 - 30 | 6.00 AM to 11.00 PM | |

== Gallery ==
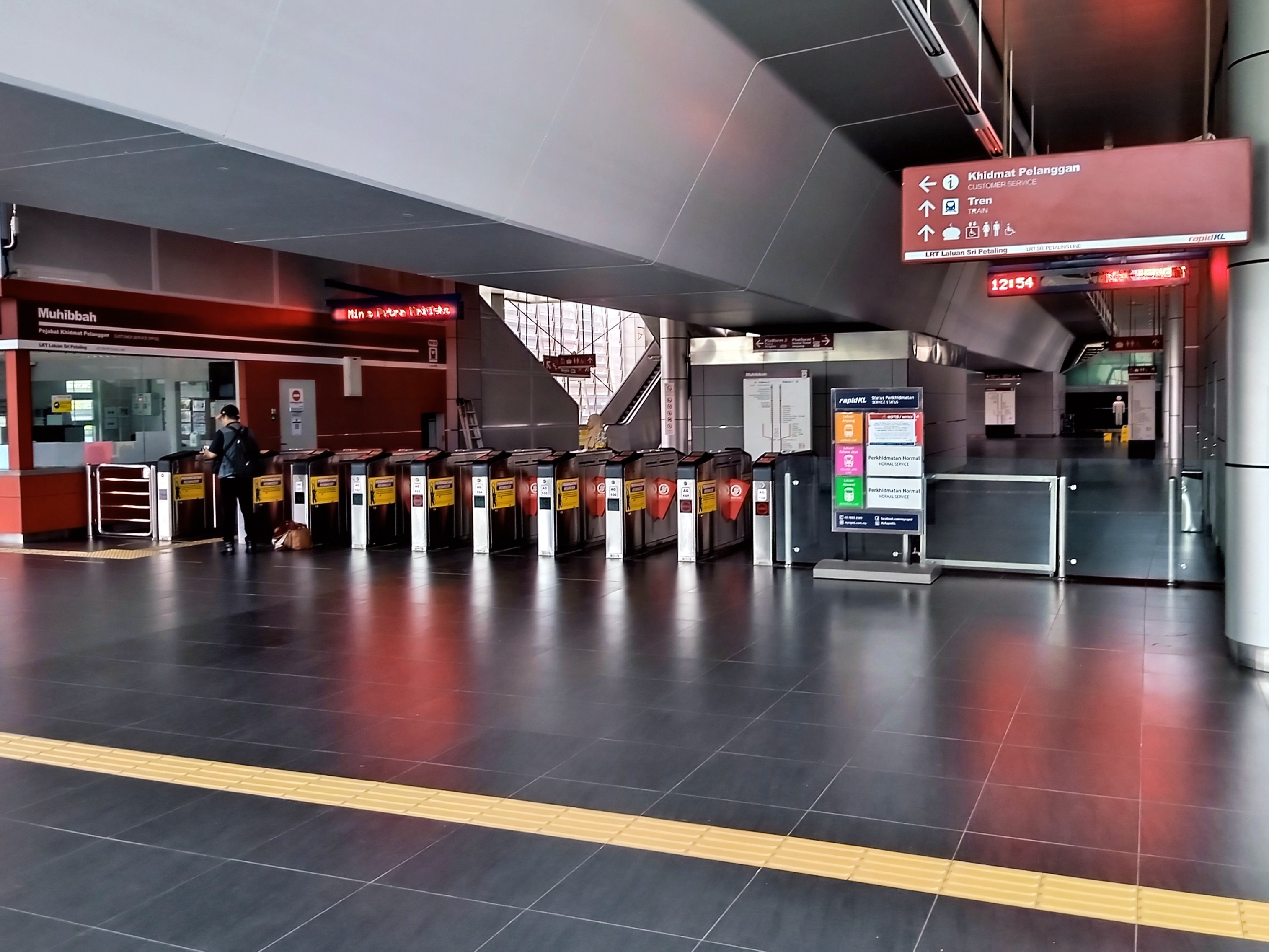
Concourse, 2023

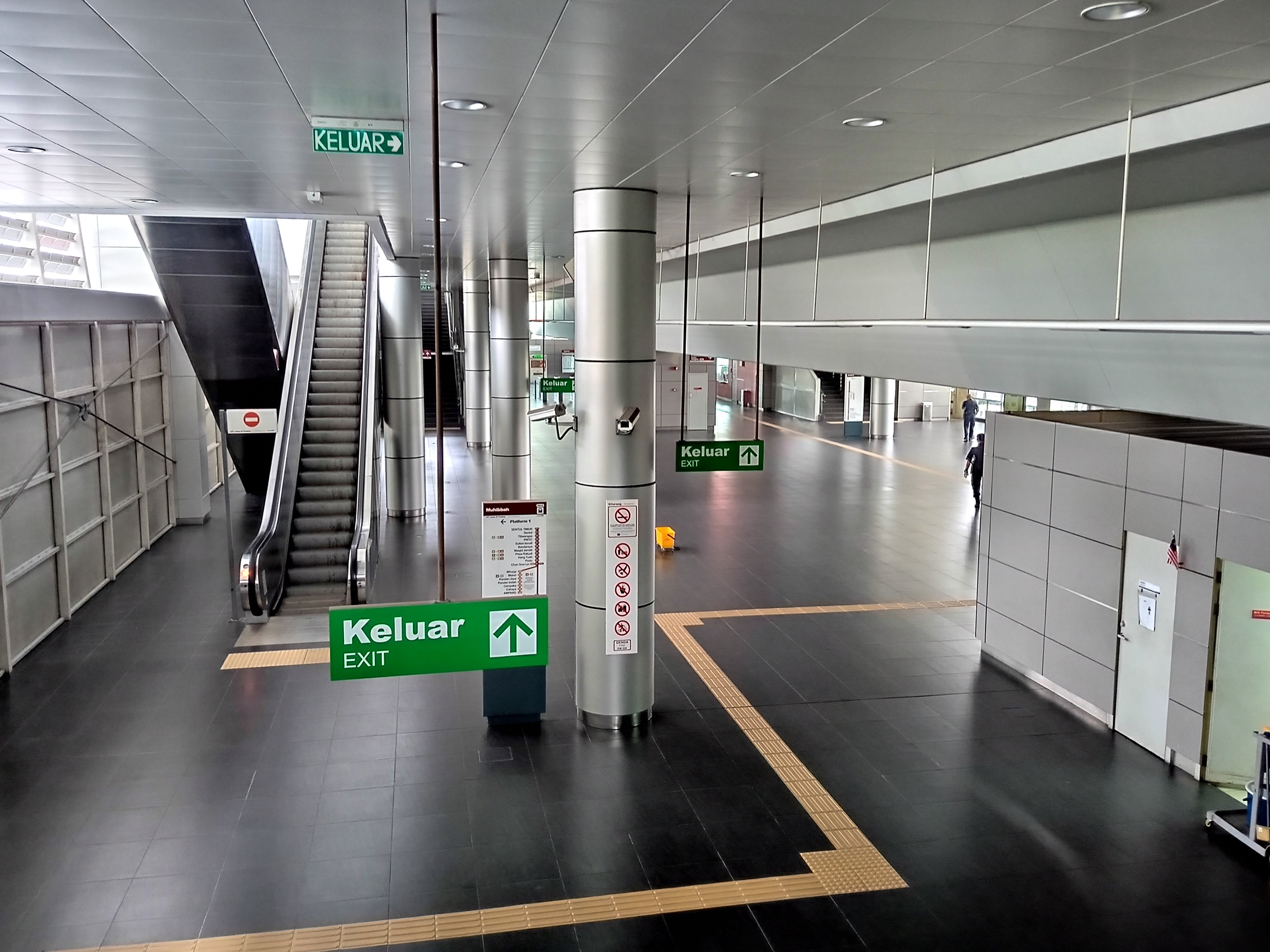
Concourse, 2023

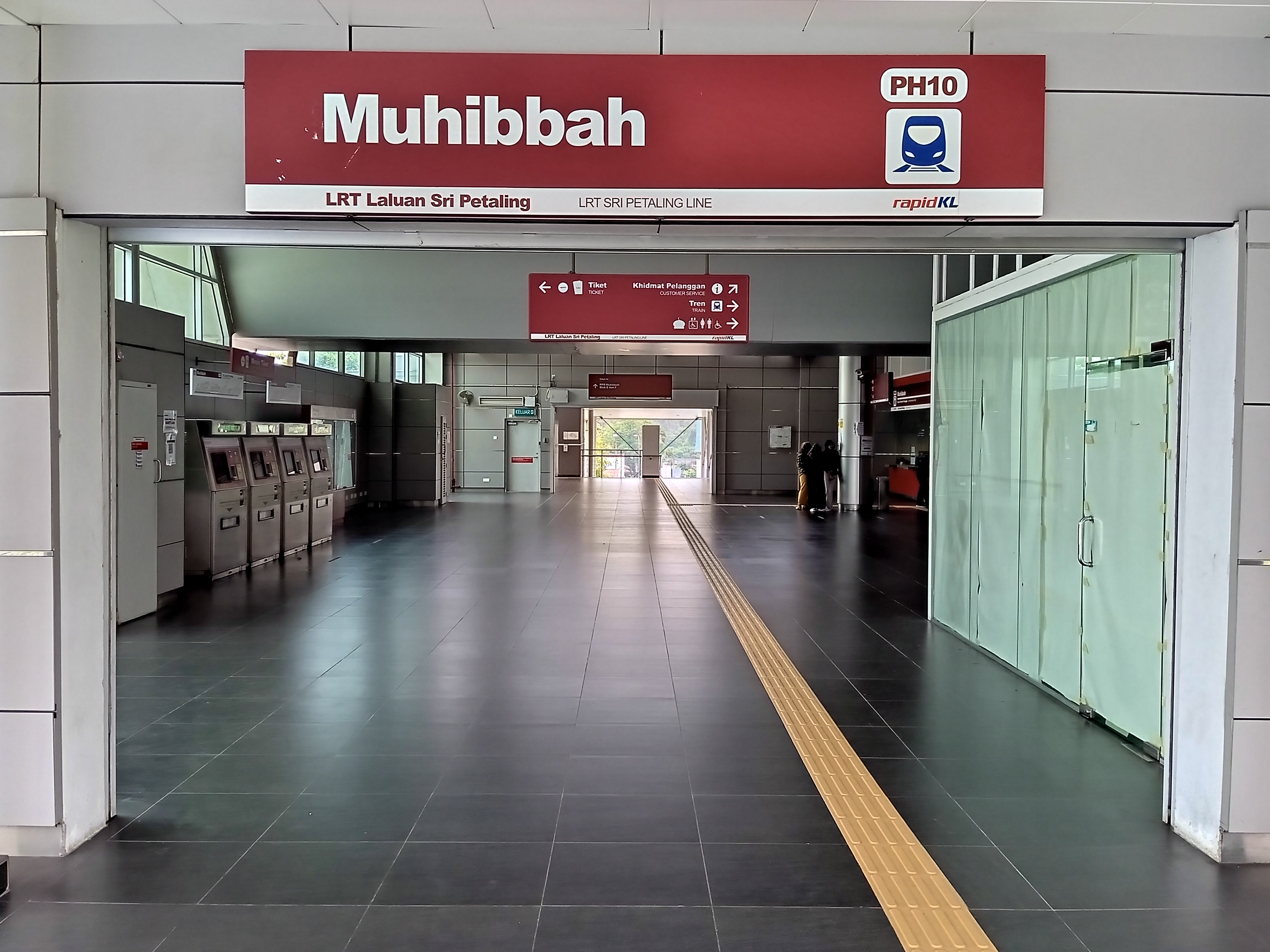
Entrance A, 2023

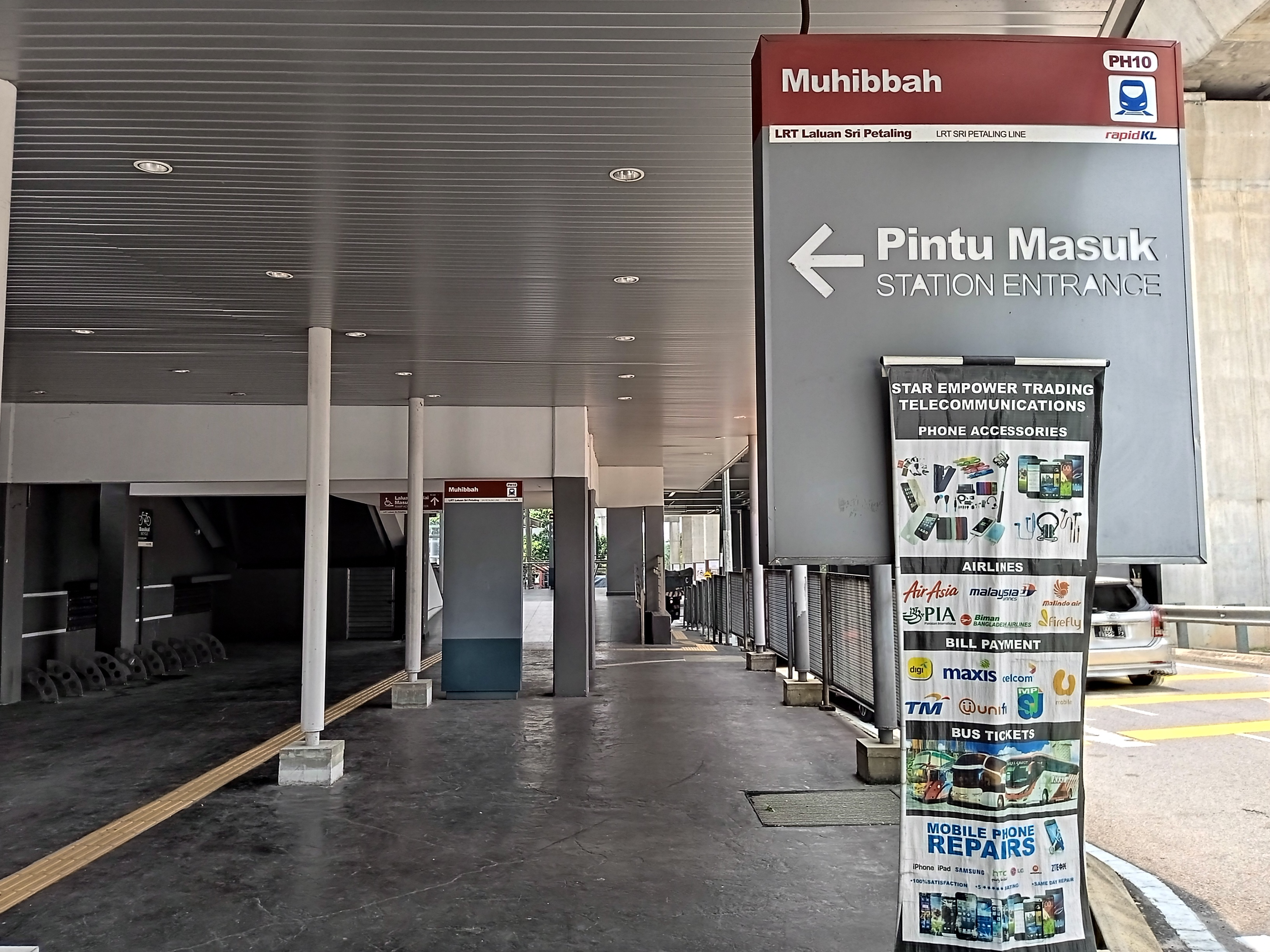
Entrance B, 2023

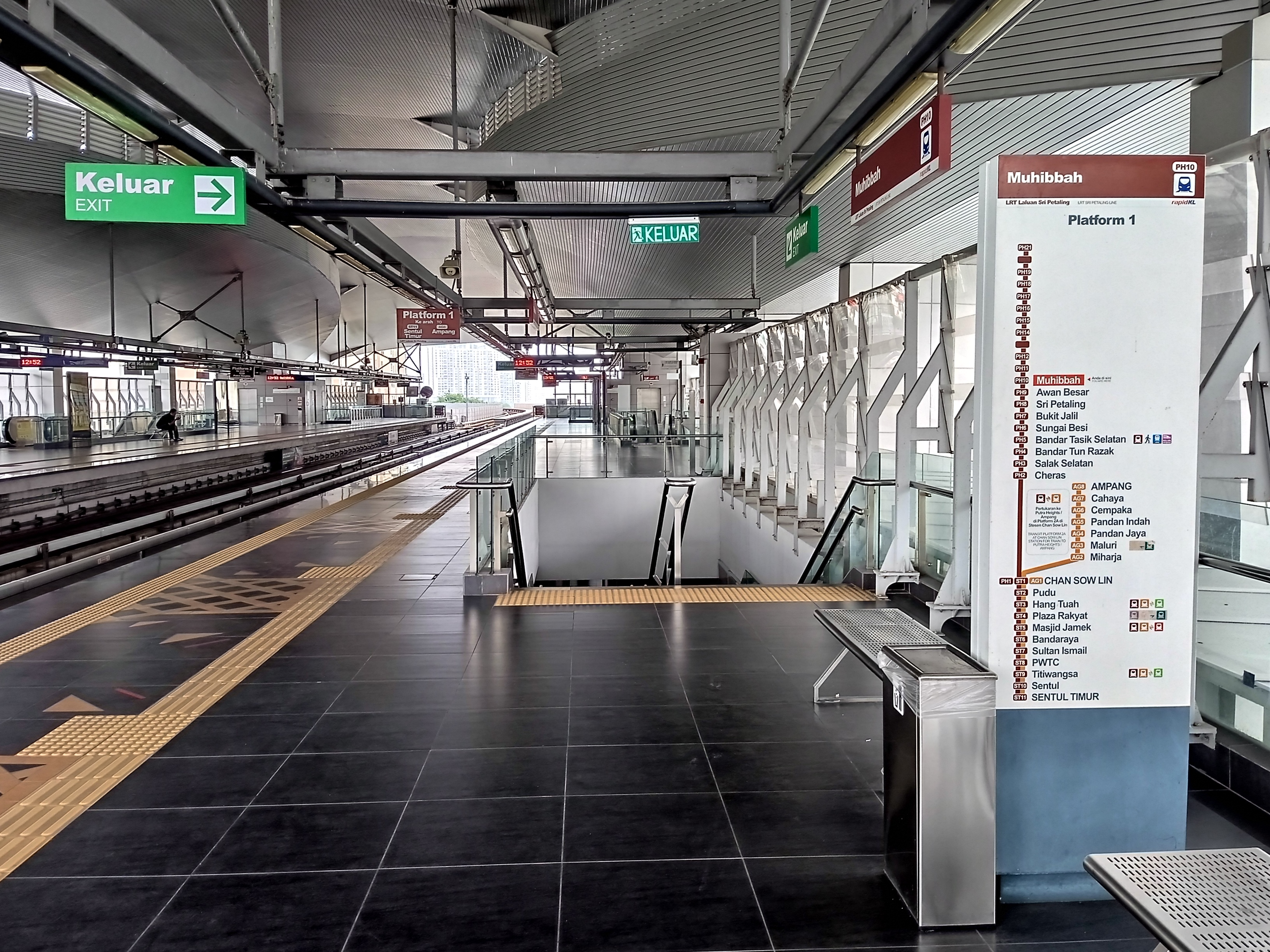
Platform 1, 2023

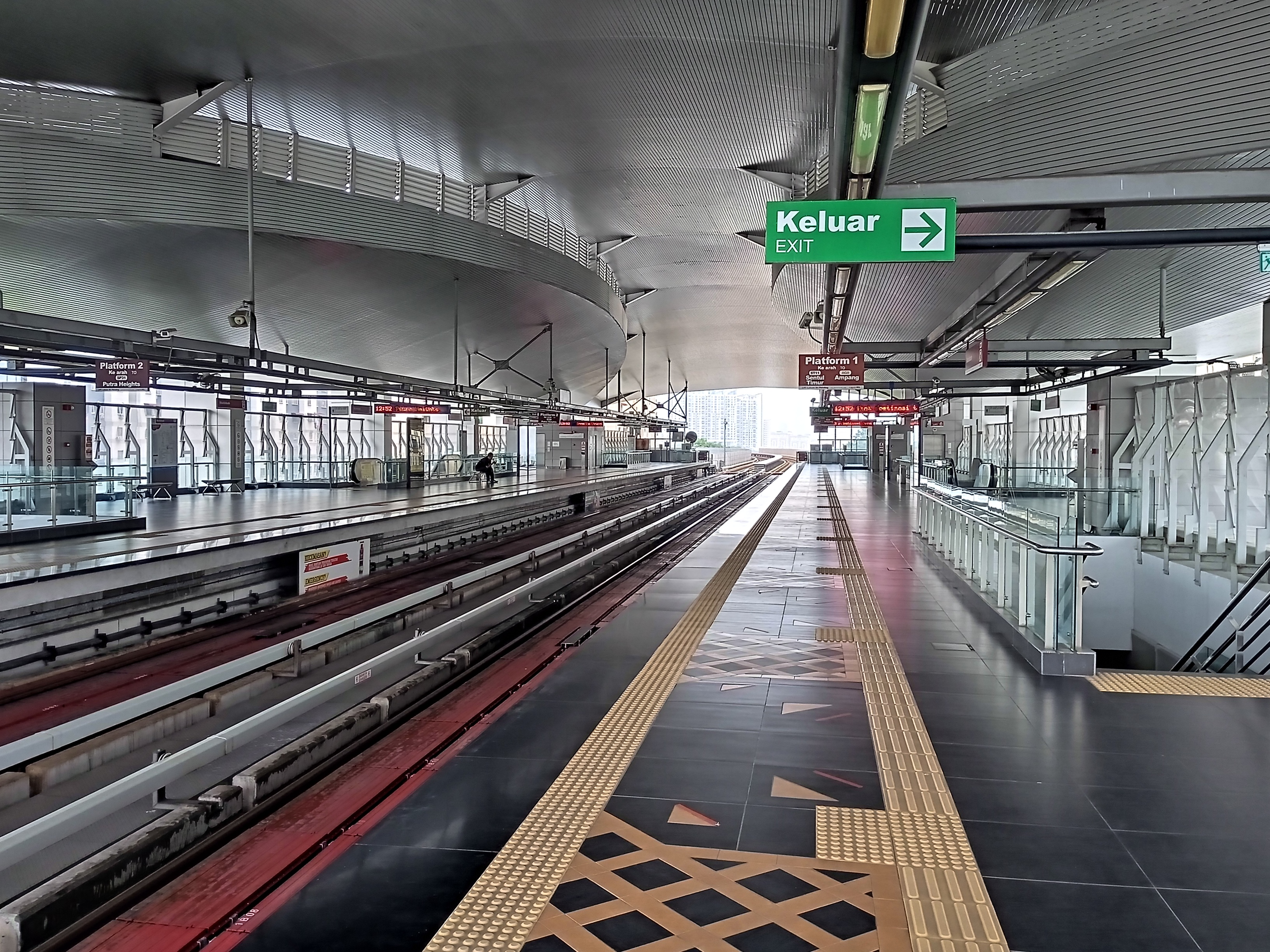
Platforms, 2023
