= Sri Petaling LRT station =

Metro station in Kuala Lumpur, Malaysia

SP18 Sri Petaling
- Platforms

General information
- Other names: Malay: سري ڤتاليڠ (Jawi); Chinese: 大城堡; Tamil: செரி பெட்டாலிங்
- Location: Bukit Jalil; 57000 Kuala Lumpur; Malaysia
- Coordinates: 3°3′41″N 101°41′13″E
- System: Rapid KL
- Owner: Prasarana Malaysia
- Operator: Rapid Rail
- Line: 4 Sri Petaling Line
- Platforms: 2 side platforms
- Tracks: 2

Construction
- Structure type: Subsurface
- Parking: Available with payment, under Majlis Sukan Negara.
- Accessible: Yes

Other information
- Station code: SP18

History
- Opened: 11 July 1998; 28 years ago
- Former names: Komanwel

Services
Preceding station		Following station
Bukit Jalil towards Sentul Timur	Sri Petaling Line	Awan Besar towards Putra Heights
Location

The Sri Petaling LRT station is a light rapid transit (LRT) station in Bukit Jalil, serving both Bukit Jalil and Sri Petaling, a suburb about 20 km south of Kuala Lumpur, the capital of Malaysia. Despite its name, the station is not physically located within the boundaries of the township of Sri Petaling. However, it is connected to the town via a road and flyover over the Shah Alam Expressway.

== History ==
The station opened on 11 July 1998 as part of section A of phase 2 of the then STAR LRT line project, the first 7 of 11 stations of phase 2 to begin operation. As part of its extension, the Adtranz-Walkers EMU trains used at the time were to lengthened from 4 cars to 6 cars.

It served as the southern terminus of the branch from Chan Sow Lin, then as the southern terminus of the Sri Petaling line in 2005 until the line was further extended to Putra Heights on 30 June 2016.

Like the neighbouring Bukit Jalil station, it was planned in preparation for and opened in commemoration of the 1998 Commonwealth Games. Originally named Komanwel station ("Commonwealth" spelled in Malay), it served as the rail connection between the Commonwealth Games Athletes Village (now known as the Vista Komanwel condominium complex) and the National Sports Complex via Sukan Negara station (today Bukit Jalil station). It was then slated to be capable of carrying 24,000 per hour passengers to Bukit Jalil.

== Passenger services ==
=== Access ===
The station has a single access along Jalan Barat beside Bukit Komanwel, under the Maju Expressway flyover.

=== Station layout ===
G	Station building
LG	Platform level	Side platform
LG	Platform level	Platform 1: → 4 Sri Petaling Line towards SP1 Sentul Timur (Bukit Jalil)
LG	Platform level	Platform 2: ← 4 Sri Petaling Line towards SP31 Putra Heights (Awan Besar)
LG	Platform level	Side platform

=== Other connections ===
The station is also served by Rapid KL DRT services, as well as Rapid KL buses 580 and 652 along nearby bus stops.

== Nearby ==
- IMU University
- Columbia Asia Hospital Bukit Jalil
- Bukit Komanwel
- Vista Komanwel
- Covillea Bukit Jalil

== Gallery ==
Station concourse

Exterior view of the station
