= Technology Park Malaysia =

Science park in Bukit Jalil, Kuala Lumpur, Malaysia

Coordinates: 3.0507444°N 101.6802006°E

Technology Park Malaysia Corporation Sdn Bhd
- Company type: Government-linked company
- Founded: 1995
- Headquarters: Level 5, Enterprise 4, Technology Park Malaysia, 57000 Bukit Jalil, Kuala Lumpur, Malaysia
- Key people: Datuk Abdul Razak Abdul Rahman, Chairman; Dzuleira Abu Bakar, Chief Executive Officer
- Parent: Minister of Finance Incorporated
- Website: www.tpm.com.my

Technology Park Malaysia (TPM) is a science park located in Bukit Jalil, Kuala Lumpur, Malaysia for research and development of knowledge-based industries. Its total land area of 750 acres (3.0 km^{2}), comprises 13 buildings each with specific functions. It is in phase 1 of implementation.

== History ==
The park was opened on 28 November 1996 by then-Prime Minister Mahathir Mohamed. The first phase cost RM 237 million while the second phase, which was expected to be completed in 2000, cost RM 226 million.

== Overview ==
Since its establishment, it provides support services, technology and R&D capability to stimulate the growth of science, technology and innovation. This includes rental of incubator premises to scientist, researchers, technopreneurs and SMEs, and lease of land parcels for technology knowledge-based companies. TPM also provides technology and business incubation programs including business mentoring and coaching services, marketing and financial consulting, technology and business forums, workshops and business matching.

== Services ==
Other services include technology commercialization assistance to support to the commercialization of technology, including advisory and consultancy of technology transfer, project management, strategic management counsel, market research and opportunity analysis, and professional development programs.

== Subsidiaries ==
- TPM Engineering Sdn Bhd
- TPM Nexus Sdn Bhd
- TPM IT Sdn Bhd

== List of companies in TPM ==
- Astro All Asia Networks
- Asia Pacific University of Technology & Innovation
- MIMOS
- IRIS Corporation Berhad
- HexoSys SDN BHD
- HCL Axon Malaysia SDN BHD
- Software International Corporation SDN BHD
- ACE Training Malaysia
- Synergy Log In Systems Sdn Bhd

== Facilities & Services ==
- Co-working space
- Conference Area
- Small to medium scale meeting rooms
- Auditoriums
- Multi-function exhibition area
- Gymnasium
- Indoor and outdoor game facilities
- Technoflex (Recreation Centre)
- High speed internet
- Cafes and food court
- Auxiliary Police surveillance
- Ample parking space
- Medical clinics

== See also ==
- Cyberjaya
