= Jalan Tun Perak =

Major road in Kuala Lumpur, Malaysia

- Mountbatten Road
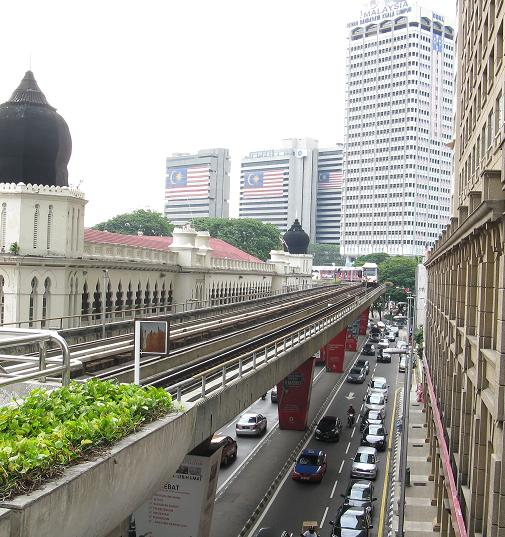

Major junctions
- West end: Jalan Tuanku Abdul Rahman
- Jalan Parlimen; Jalan Raja Laut; Jalan Tuanku Abdul Rahman
- East end: Pudu Sentral roundabout

Location
- Country: Malaysia
- Primary destinations: Masjid Jamek

Highway system
- Highways in Malaysia; Expressways; Federal; State

Jalan Tun Perak, formerly Jalan Mountbatten (1961–1981) Mountbatten Road (1946–1961) and Java Street (1889–1946), is a major road located in the historic centre of Kuala Lumpur, Malaysia. It was a major commercial street of early Kuala Lumpur, and is now the location of a few financial institutions. The entry to the Jamek Mosque is located here, and the light rapid transit stop on this street is Masjid Jamek LRT station.

== History ==
Jalan Tun Perak, along with Jalan Ampang, is one of the oldest roads in Kuala Lumpur. It was originally named Java Street; it was in an area initially settled by Malays and other people from Java and Sumatra, hence the name of this street and the nearby Malay Street (Jalan Melayu). It formed the boundary between Chinese and Malay areas in early Kuala Lumpur. A Boyanese community centre was once located on the street and Kampung Rawa was located to its north. Indian Chettiars and Indian Muslims also settled in the area. A Malay cemetery was located close by and on which Jamek Mosque, one of the oldest mosques in Kuala Lumpur, was then built in 1909. Java Street was later renamed Mountbatten Road, and later still Jalan Tun Perak.

By the beginning of the 20th century, the road had developed into a busy commercial street for local businesses but also what was described as "the slum of slums of our local paradise". However, as it was located near the hub of colonial activities (the church, cricket ground, courthouses and government offices), the area soon developed into the favoured location for siting many well-known stores of the time, such as Robinson's (opened in 1928), John Little (1914, along New Embankment Road and Ampang Street), and Whiteaway Laidlaw.

By the 1970s, the street had declined in popularity as a shopping area; many stores closed and were replaced by financial institutions. The Robinson's department store was acquired by United Asian Bank in 1976, and the building was demolished to make way for the bank's headquarters (now called Menara UAB) which was completed in 1984. Another bank building is now the most prominent building on Jalan Tun Perak – the Maybank Tower which is located at the end of the street where it meets Jalan Pudu. The tower was built in 1987 on the location of the colonial-era Subordinate Courts building at Bukit Mahkamah which was demolished in 1982.

Opposite Menara UAB is a Mughal-style building by British architect and soldier A. B. Hubback (who also designed the Jamek Mosque next to it) constructed in 1910 and once housed the Federated Malay States Survey Office. It was later used as the Sessions & Magistrates Courts, and was also occupied by the Department of Information (Jabatan Penerangan) Malaysia after the courts moved out. Another surviving building from the early period is the Gian Singh Building at the corner of Lebuh Ampang built in 1909. At the junction with Malacca Street (Jalan Melaka) is a five-storey Art Deco-style Oriental Building built in 1932, which at that time was the tallest building in Kuala Lumpur, and it once housed Radio Malaya.

In 1996, the elevated track of the Ampang line of the light rapid transit (LRT) system was constructed along the entire stretch of Jalan Tun Perak. A station was also constructed with an elevated platform over the bridge at Klang River beside Masjid Jamek after which the station is named – Masjid Jamek LRT Station. The underground Masjid Jamek station, part of the PUTRA LRT line, opened in 1999, and became an interchange with the Ampang Line. The station occupies the location of the former Whiteaway Laidlaw department store.

== Gallery ==
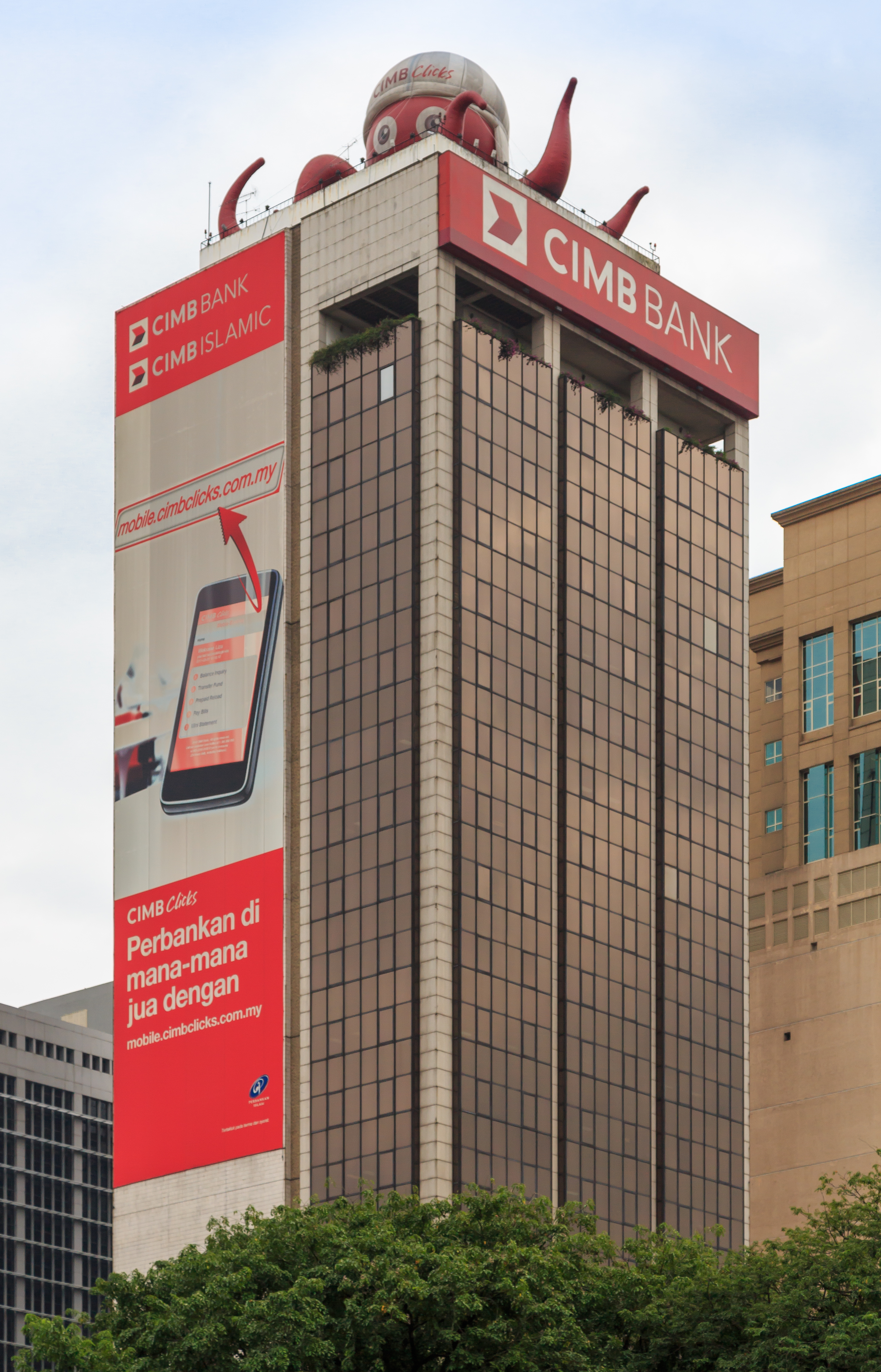
Menara UAB - Former Bumiputra-Commerce Bank headquarter

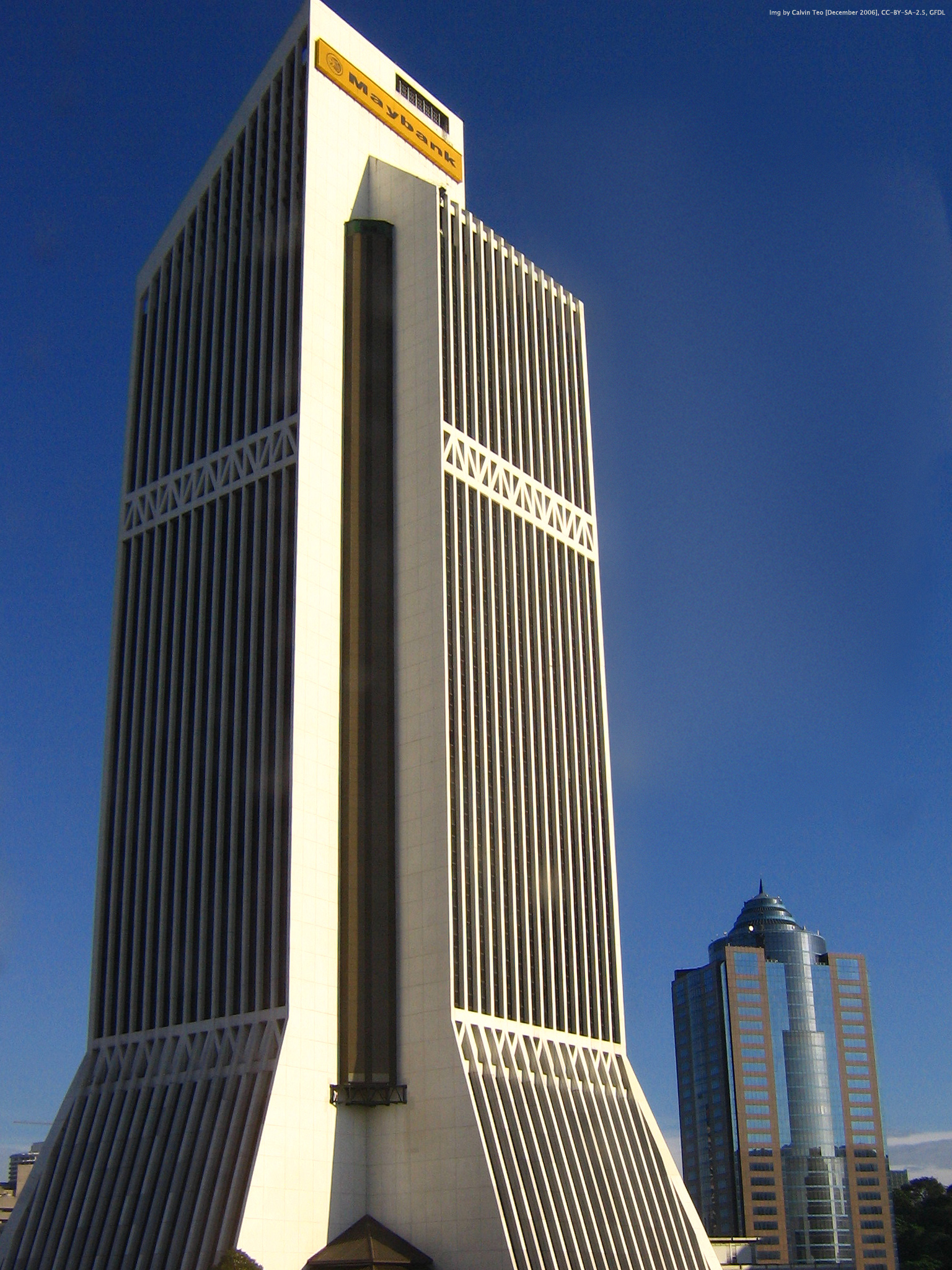
Tun Perak Tower

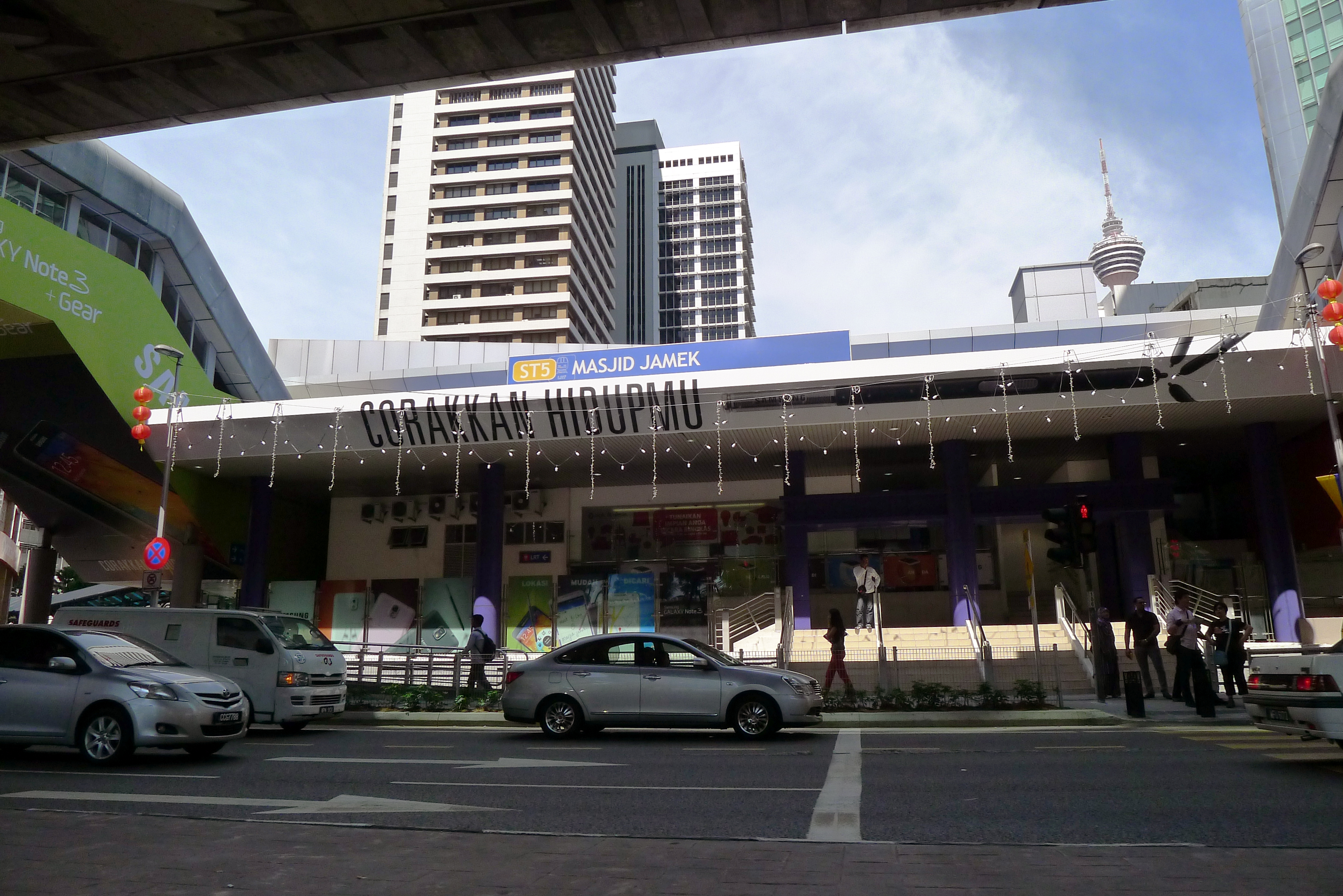
Masjid Jamek LRT Station entrance on Jalan Tun Perak

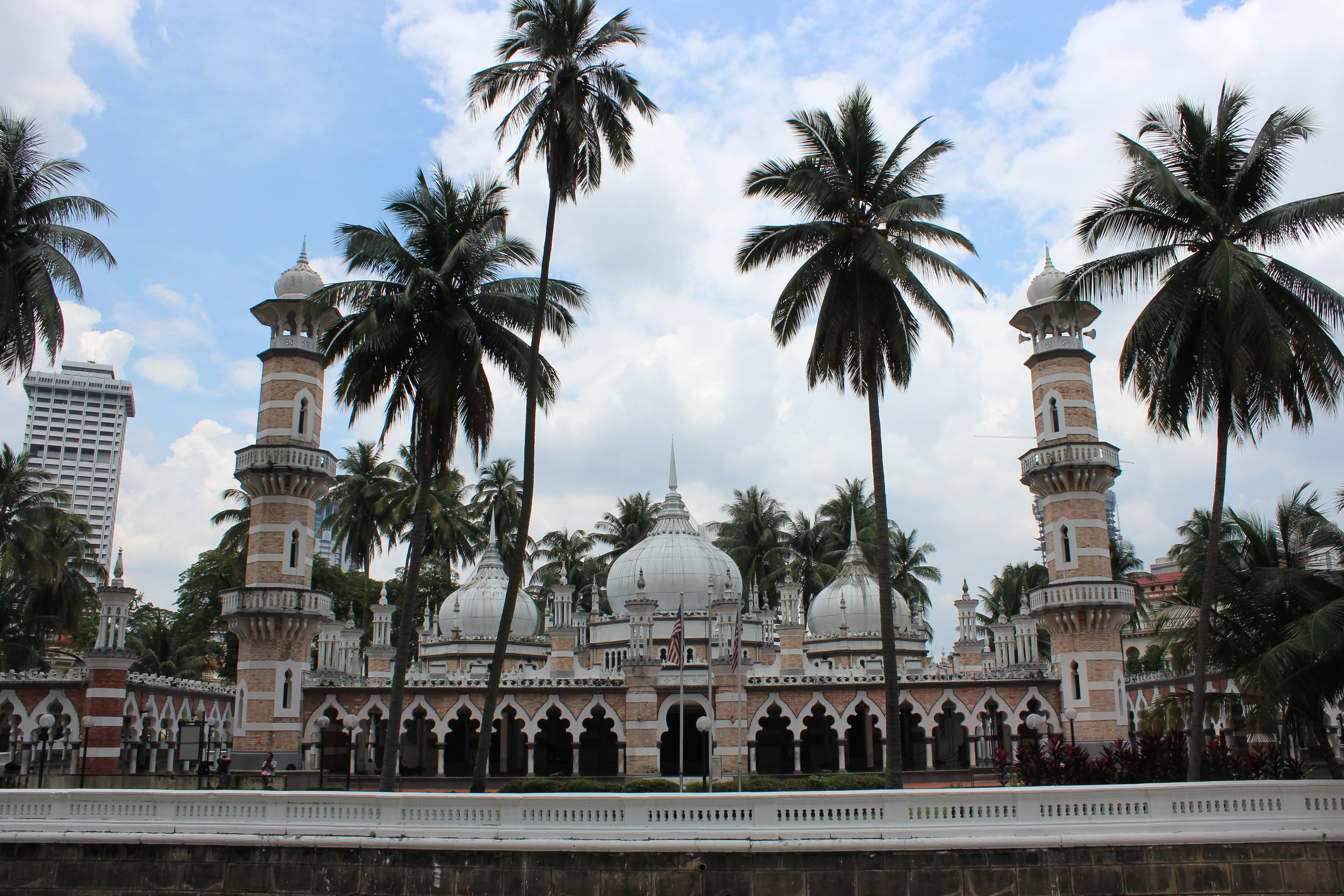
Masjid Jamek, side view from Jalan Benteng across the Klang River

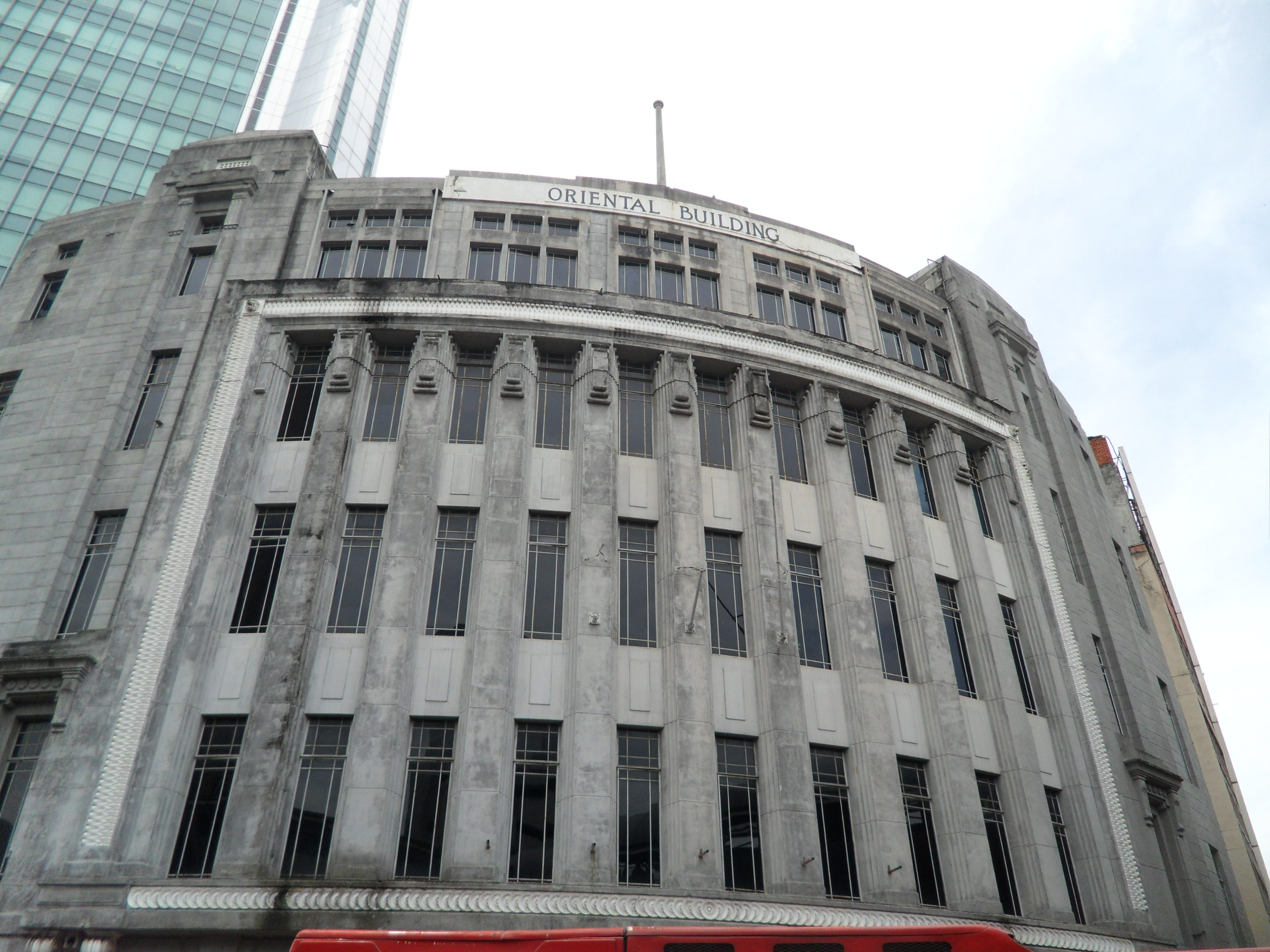
Oriental Building

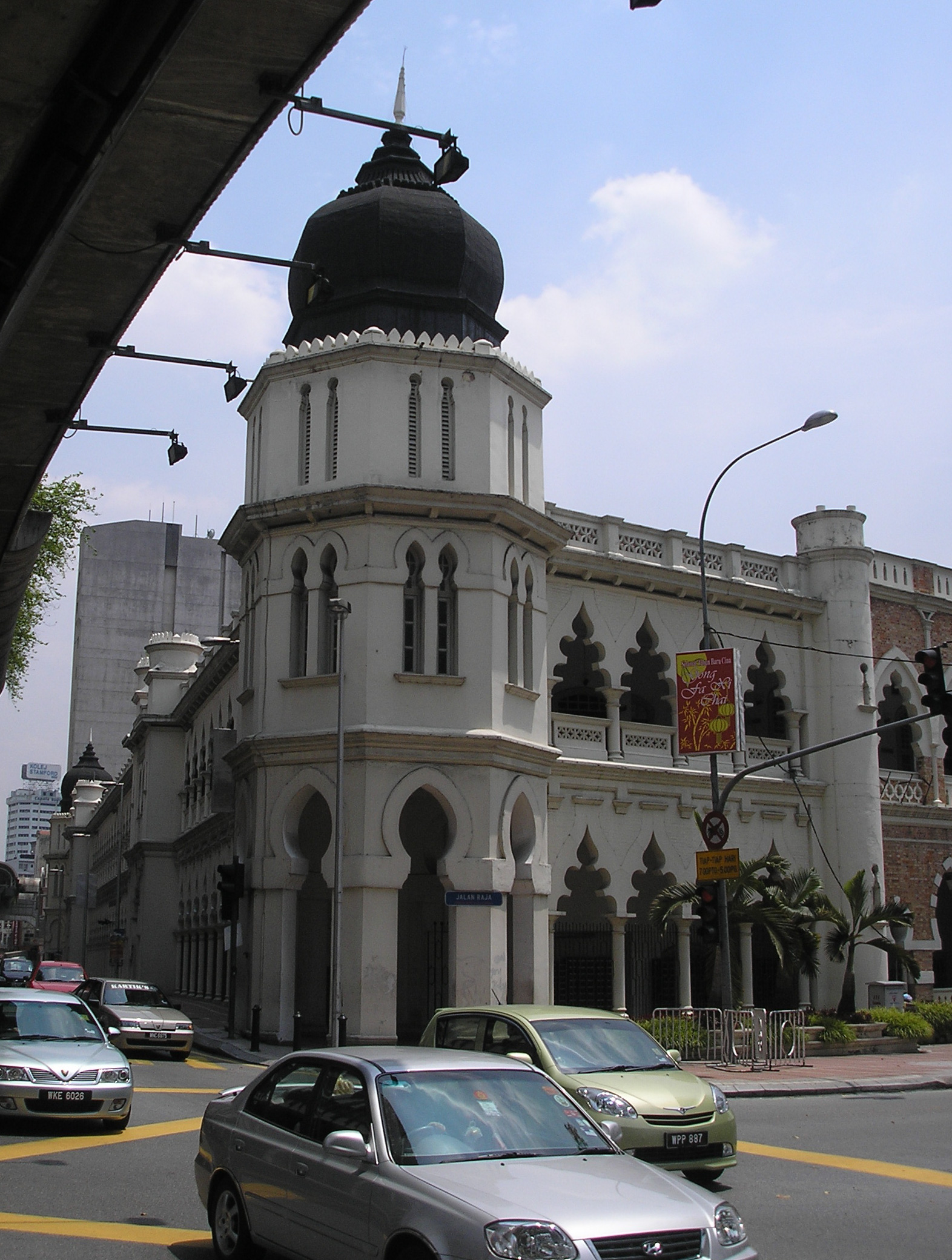
The former Federated Malay States Survey Office

== List of junctions ==
km	Exit	Junctions	To	Remarks
			West; Jalan Parlimen (Club Road); Malaysia Houses of Parliament; Perdana Lake Gardens; Tugu Negara; Jalan Duta; Sprint Expressway Damansara; Kuala Lumpur Inner Ring Road; Jalan Kuching; Ipoh; Jalan Kinabalu; Seremban	
Jalan Parlimen
Jalan Tun Perak
		Jalan Raja Laut	North Only; Jalan Raja Laut; Jalan Sultan Ismail; KLCC; Jalan Ipoh; Jalan Pahang	Junctions
			South Only; Jalan Raja; Dataran Merdeka; Bangunan Sultan Abdul Samad; Muzium Sejarah Nasional; Dayabumi; Jalan Sultan Hishamuddin	Junctions; Note: Closed for traffic from 7:00 pm until 5:00 am on weekends Closed for traffic due to special events
		Jalan Tuanku Abdul Rahman	North Only; Jalan Tuanku Abdul Rahman (Jalan Raja to the south)	
		Bangunan CIMB		
		Menara OCBC		
		Wisma Kraftangan		
		Jalan Melayu	Jalan Melayu	
		Masjid Jamek		
		Masjid Jamek LRT station Sungai Klang Bridge	3 Ampang Line; 4 Sri Petaling Line; 5 Kelana Jaya Line	
		Jalan Melaka	Jalan Melaka; Jalan Ampang	
		Jalan Benteng	Jalan Benteng	
		Leboh Ampang	Northeast; Leboh Ampang (Ampang Street); Jalan Ampang; Jalan Dang Wangi; KLCC	Junctions
		Jalan Tun HS Lee	South; Jalan Tun Hs Lee; Petaling Street; Jalan Cheng Lock	Junctions
		Jalan Raja Chulan	Northeast; Jalan Raja Chulan (Weld Road); Jalan P Ramlee; Jalan Bukit Bintang; Muzium Telekom; Kuala Lumpur Tower	
		Leboh Pudu	Leboh Pudu	
		Sinar Kota		
		Menara Maybank		
Jalan Tun Perak
		Pudu Sentral Roundabout	East; Jalan Pudu; Pudu Sentral; Jalan Hang Tuah (IRR); Cheras; North–South Expressway Southern Route Seremban Southwest; Jalan Cheng Lock (Foch Avenue); Petaling Street; Jalan Tun Sambanthan	Junctions
