= Jalan Parlimen =

Road in Malaysia

- Club Road
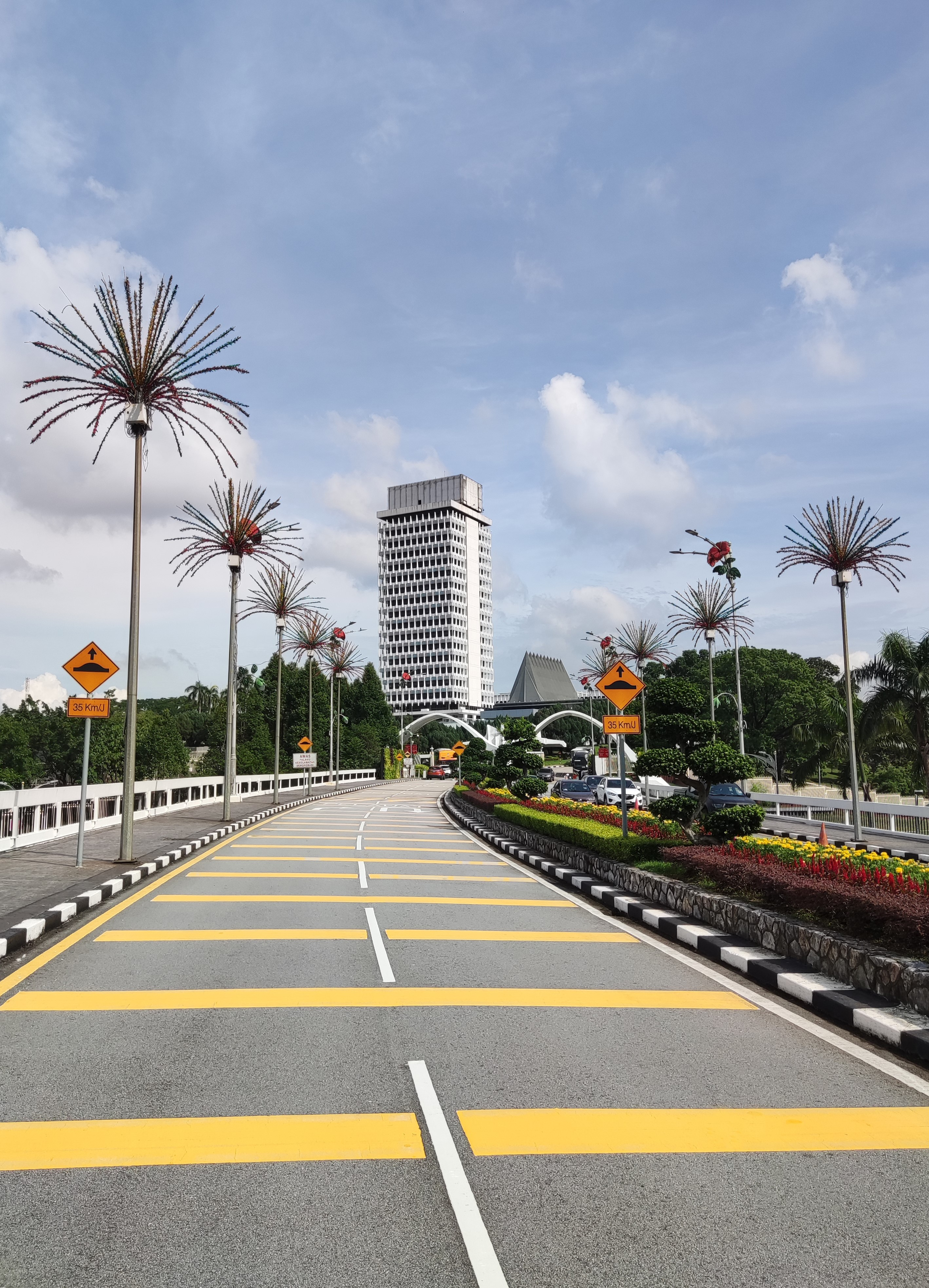

Major junctions
- West end: Parliament House
- Kuala Lumpur Middle Ring Road 1 Kuala Lumpur Inner Ring Road; Jalan Raja Laut; Jalan Tuanku Abdul Rahman; Jalan Tun Perak
- East end: Jalan Tuanku Abdul Rahman

Location
- Country: Malaysia
- Primary destinations: Perdana Lake Gardens; Dataran Merdeka; City centre Pudu

Highway system
- Highways in Malaysia; Expressways; Federal; State

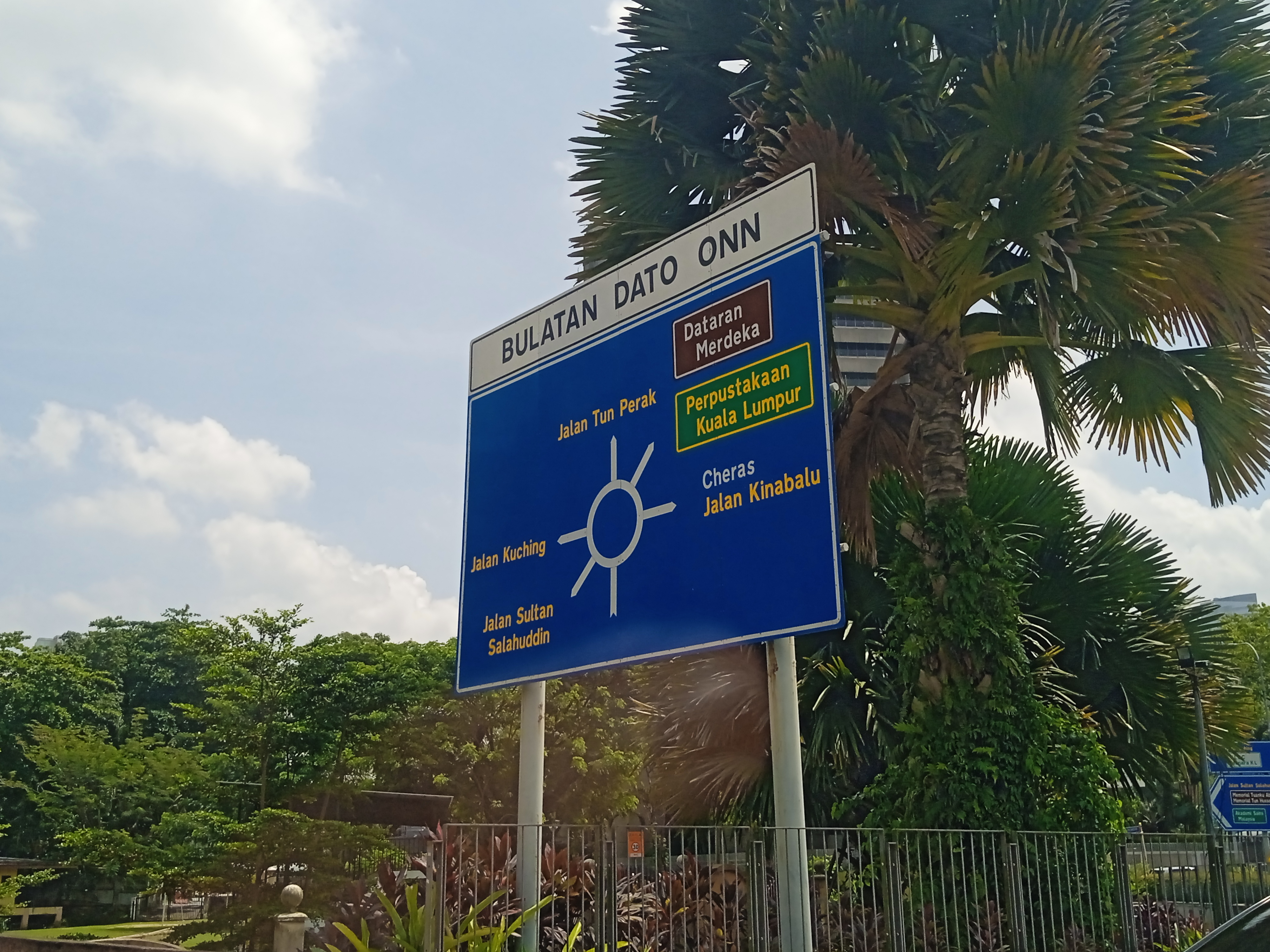
Bulatan Dato Onn intersection sign at Jalan Parlimen

Jalan Parlimen (formerly Club Road) is a major road in Kuala Lumpur, Malaysia.

== List of junctions ==
km	Exit	Junctions	To	Remarks
		Parliament House		Restricted area
Parliament House; Restricted area
Jalan Parlimen
		Parliament bridge		
				No entry
		Parliament interchange	Kuala Lumpur Middle Ring Road 1 North; Putra World Trade Centre (PWTC); Sentul; Jalan Tun Razak South; Sungai Besi; Seremban Northwest; Jalan Duta-Segambut Highway; Jalan Duta; Damansara; Segambut; Ipoh; Klang	Interchange
		Perdana Lake Gardens	North; Persiaran Sultan Salahuddin; Tugu Negara (National Monument) South; Jalan Cenderasari (Spooner Road); Perdana Lake Gardens; Taman Bunga Raya; Deer Park; Orchird Park; Kuala Lumpur Bird Park; Memorial Tun Abdul Razak; Planetarium Negara; Islamic Arts Museum Malaysia; Masjid Negara and Makam Pahlawan	Junctions
		Padang Merbok		East bound
		Jalan Tangsi	South; Jalan Tangsi; Wisma Ekran	West bound
		Bulatan Dato' Onn	Northwest; Jalan Sultan Salahuddin (Swettenham Road); Bank Negara headquarters Memorial Tunku Abdul Rahman; Malaysian Public Works Department (JKR) main headquarters Malaysian Ministry of Works headquarters FT 1 Kuala Lumpur Inner Ring Road North; Jalan Kuching; Jalan Sultan Ismail; Segambut; Ipoh; Kuantan South; Jalan Kinabalu; Seremban; Petaling Jaya; Shah Alam; Klang Southeast; Dataran Merdeka Sultan Abdul Samad Building; Selangor Club; St Mary's Church; Kuala Lumpur City Library	Roundabout
				Maximum height limit 3.5 m (11" 6")
		Bulatan Dato' Onn	Northwest; Jalan Sultan Salahuddin (Swettenham Road); Bank Negara Malaysia main headquarters Memorial Tunku Abdul Rahman; Malaysian Public Works Department (JKR) main headquarters Malaysian Ministry of Works headquarters FT 1 Kuala Lumpur Inner Ring Road North; Jalan Kuching; Jalan Sultan Ismail; Segambut; Ipoh; Kuantan South; Jalan Kinabalu; Seremban; Petaling Jaya; Shah Alam; Klang Southeast; Dataran Merdeka Sultan Abdul Samad Building; Selangor Club; St Mary's Church; Kuala Lumpur City Library	Roundabout
		Sungai Klang bridge		
		Jalan Raja Laut	North Only; Jalan Raja Laut; Jalan Sultan Ismail; KLCC; Jalan Ipoh; Jalan Pahang	Junctions
			South Only; Jalan Raja; Dataran Merdeka; Bangunan Sultan Abdul Samad; Muzium Sejarah Nasional; Dayabumi; Jalan Sultan Hishamuddin	Junctions; Note: Closed for traffic from 7:00 pm until 5:00 am on weekends Closed for traffic due to special events
Jalan Parlimen
Jalan Tun Perak
			Southeast; Jalan Tun Perak (Mountbatten Road); Jalan Pudu; Jalan Tun Tan Cheng Lock	
