= Jalan Tuanku Abdul Rahman =

Major one-way road in Kuala Lumpur, Malaysia

- Jalan TAR, Batu Road
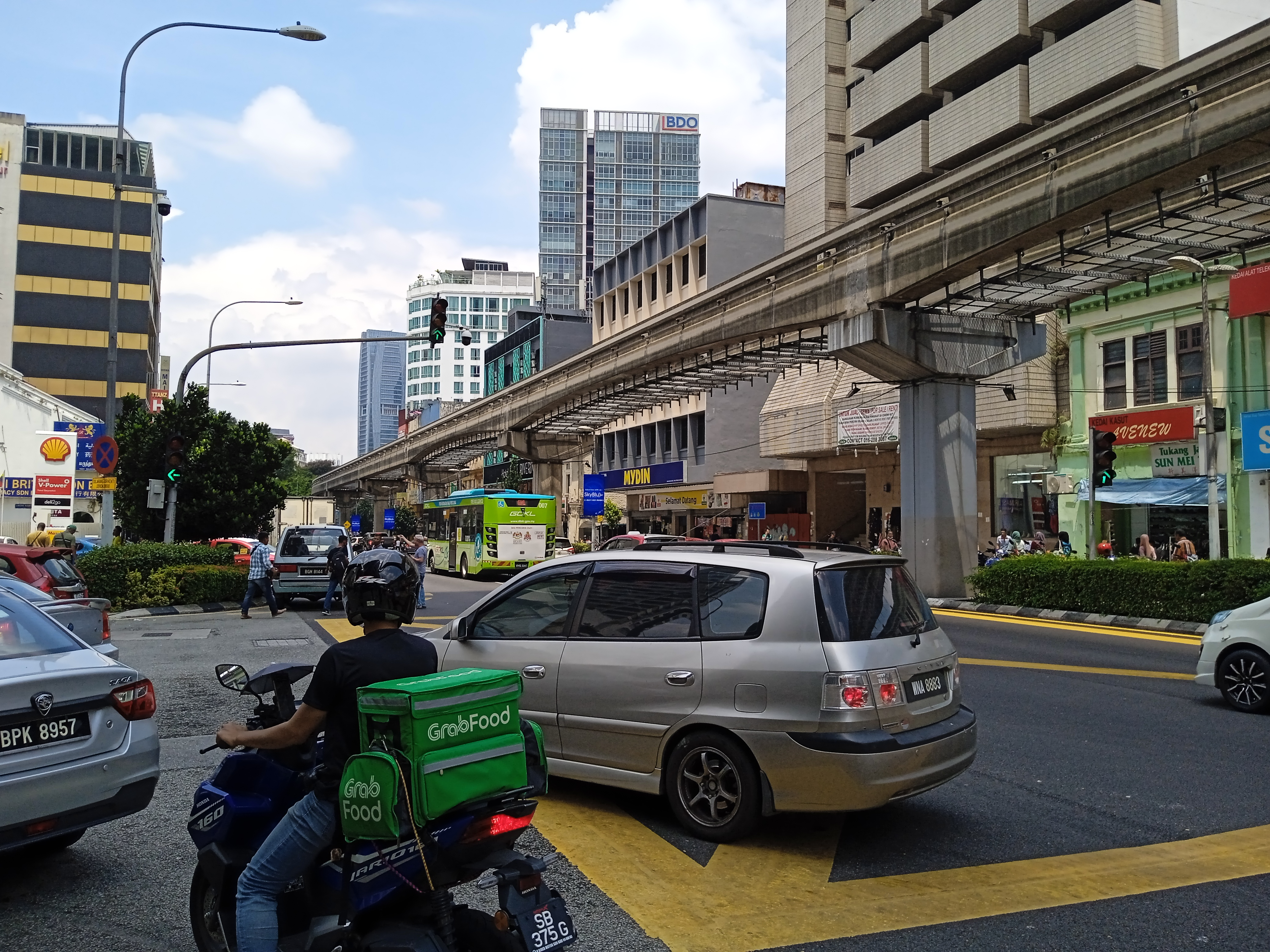

Route information
- Length: 1.90 km (1.18 mi)

Major junctions
- North end: Chow Kit
- FT 2 Genting Klang-Pahang Highway (Jalan Pahang); Jalan Ipoh; Jalan Raja Muda Abdul Aziz; Jalan Chow Kit; Kuala Lumpur Inner Ring Road (Jalan Sultan Ismail); Jalan Dang Wangi; Jalan Tun Perak; Jalan Raja
- South end: Jalan Tun Perak

Location
- Country: Malaysia
- Primary destinations: Kampung Baru; Medan Tuanku; Dang Wangi; Dataran Merdeka

Highway system
- Highways in Malaysia; Expressways; Federal; State

Jalan Tuanku Abdul Rahman (formerly Batu Road) is a major one-way road in Kuala Lumpur, Malaysia. The road is named after the first Yang di-Pertuan Agong of Malaysia, Tuanku Abdul Rahman

== Attractions ==
The shoulders of this road are lined by pre-war buildings with unique features that have been preserved. Retail shops like KSGILLS, GS Gill, P. Lal and PH Henry have locations here. Modern shopping complexes are the Sogo and Maju Junction.

Every Saturday between 5 pm to 10 pm, Lorong Tuanku Abdul Rahman is closed to vehicles to make room for a night market that offers a variety of fabrics, textiles, clothing, domestic items and food at attractive prices.

== List of junctions along the road ==
km	Exit	Junctions	To	Remarks
			North; FT 2 Genting Klang-Pahang Highway; Jalan Pahang; Jalan Tun Razak (KLMRR 1); Setapak; Kuantan	
FT 2 Jalan Pahang
		Chow Kit	East; Jalan Raja Muda Abdul Aziz (Princes Road); Kampung Baru; Jalan Semarak; Jalan Tun Razak (KLMRR 1); 8 Chow Kit Monorail station	Junctions
Jalan Tuanku Abdul Rahman
		Jalan Chow Kit	West; Jalan Chow Kit; Jalan Raja Laut; Jalan Ipoh; Sentul; Jalan Putra; Putra World Trade Centre (PWTC); 3 4 PWTC LRT station	T-junctions
		Jalan Raja Bot	East; Jalan Raja Bot; Pasar Raja Bot (Market)	T-junctions
		Jalan Haji Taib	West; Jalan Haji Taib; Bazar Haji Taib	T-junctions
		Jalan Raja Alang	East; Jalan Raja Alang (Jalan Perkins); Kampung Baru	T-junctions
		Jalan Sri Amar	West; Jalan Sri Amar East; Jalan Dewan Sultan Sultan Sulaiman (Jalan Stony)	Junctions
		Jalan Sultan Ismail	Kuala Lumpur Inner Ring Road; Jalan Sultan Ismail (Jalan Treacher) West; Jalan Raja Laut; Jalan Kuching; FT 1 Ipoh; 3 4 Sultan Ismail LRT station East; 8 Medan Tuanku Monorail station Jalan Ampang; KLCC; Jalan P. Ramlee; Jalan Bukit Bintang	Junctions
		Maju Junction		
		Medan Tuanku	East; Jalan Medan Tuanku	T-junctions
		Dang Wangi	Jalan Dang Wangi (Jalan Campbell) West; Jalan Raja Laut; Jalan Kuching; FT 1 Ipoh (For buses and taxis only) East; Jalan Ampang; Jalan Sultan Ismail (IRR); KLCC	Junctions
		Sogo shopping complex (formerly Sulaiman Courts flat)		
		Jalan Esfahan	West; Jalan Esfahan (Jalan Selat); Jalan Raja Laut; Sogo shopping complex 3 4 Bandaraya LRT station KTM Komuter Bank Negara Komuter station	T-junctions
		Laman Tuanku Abdul Rahman	Coliseum cinemas	
		Jalan Melaka	East; Jalan Melaka; Bazar Masjid India; Jalan Tun Perak	T-junctions
Jalan Tuanku Abdul Rahman
		Jalan Tun Perak	Jalan Tun Perak West; Jalan Kuching (IRR); Jalan Parlimen; Dataran Merdeka East; 3 4 5 Masjid Jamek LRT station Jalan Pudu; Jalan Tun Tan Cheng Lock	Junctions
Jalan Raja
			South; Jalan Raja; Dataran Merdeka; Bangunan Sultan Abdul Samad; Muzium Sejarah Nasional; Dayabumi; Jalan Sultan Hishamuddin	Note: Closed for traffic from 7:00 pm until 5:00 am on weekends Closed for traffic due to special events

Jalan Tuanku Abdul Rahman
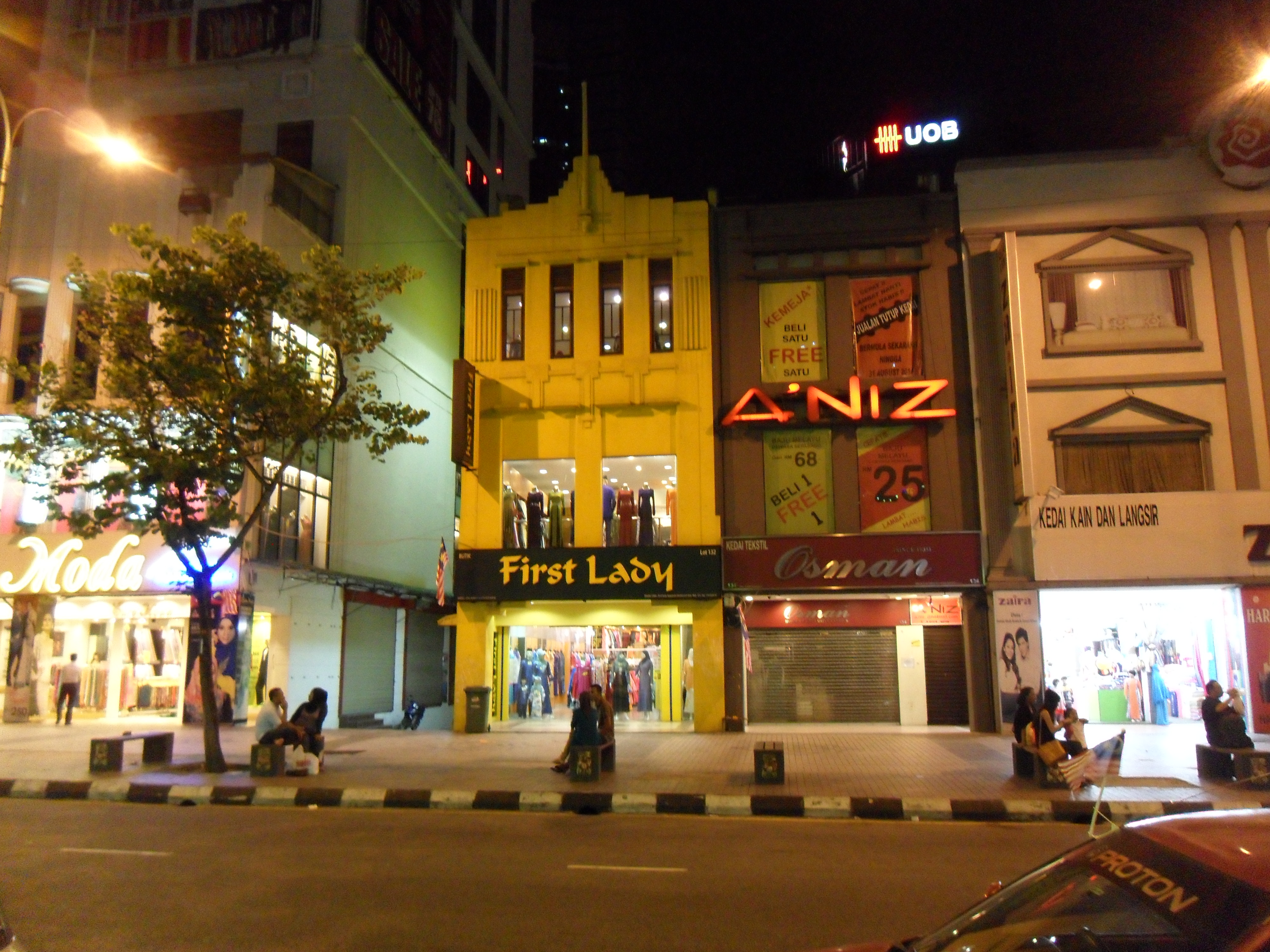
Three-storey Art Deco shophouses along Jalan Tuanku Abdul Rahman

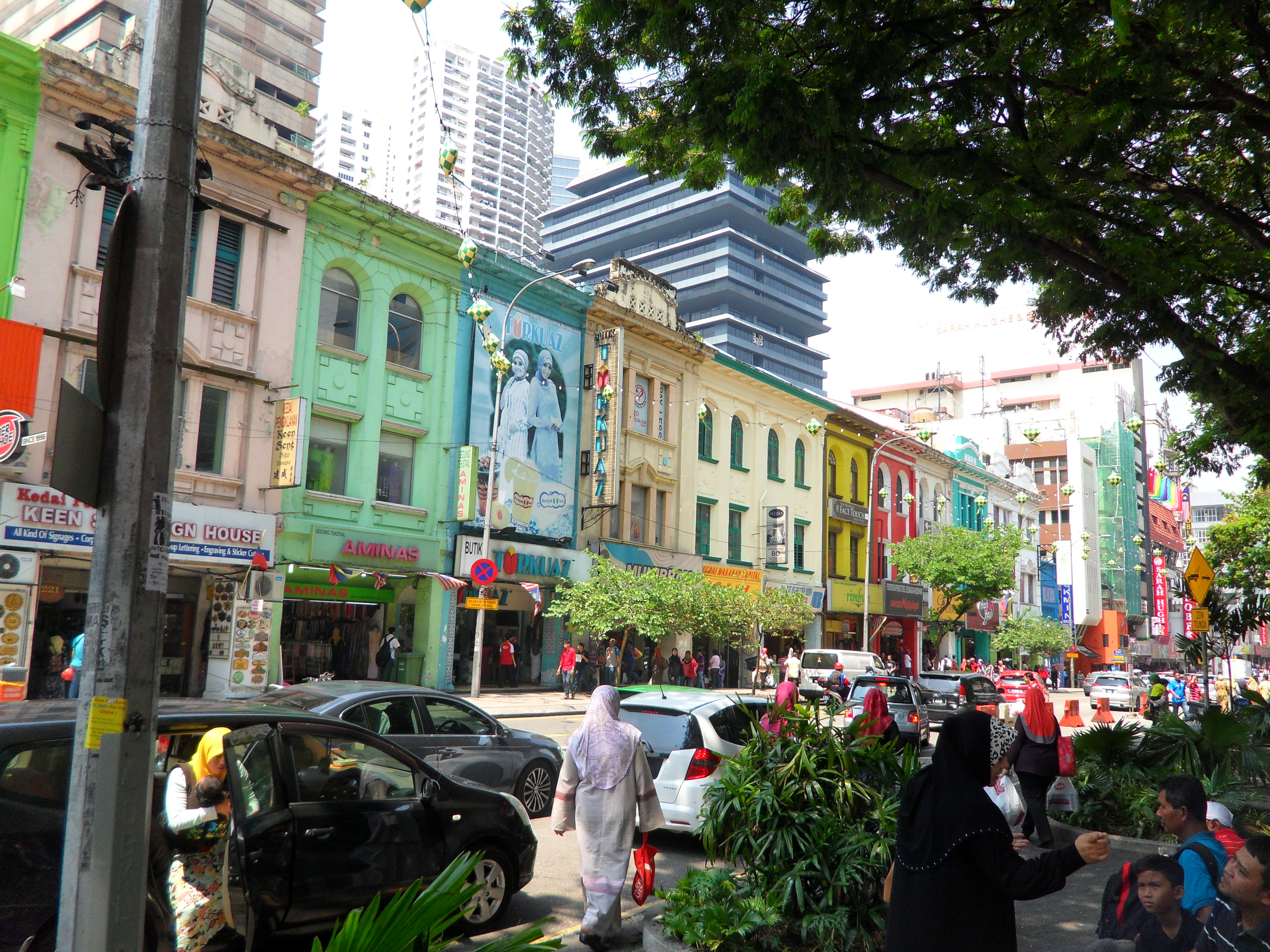
Three-storey 1920s shophouses just opposite Sogo

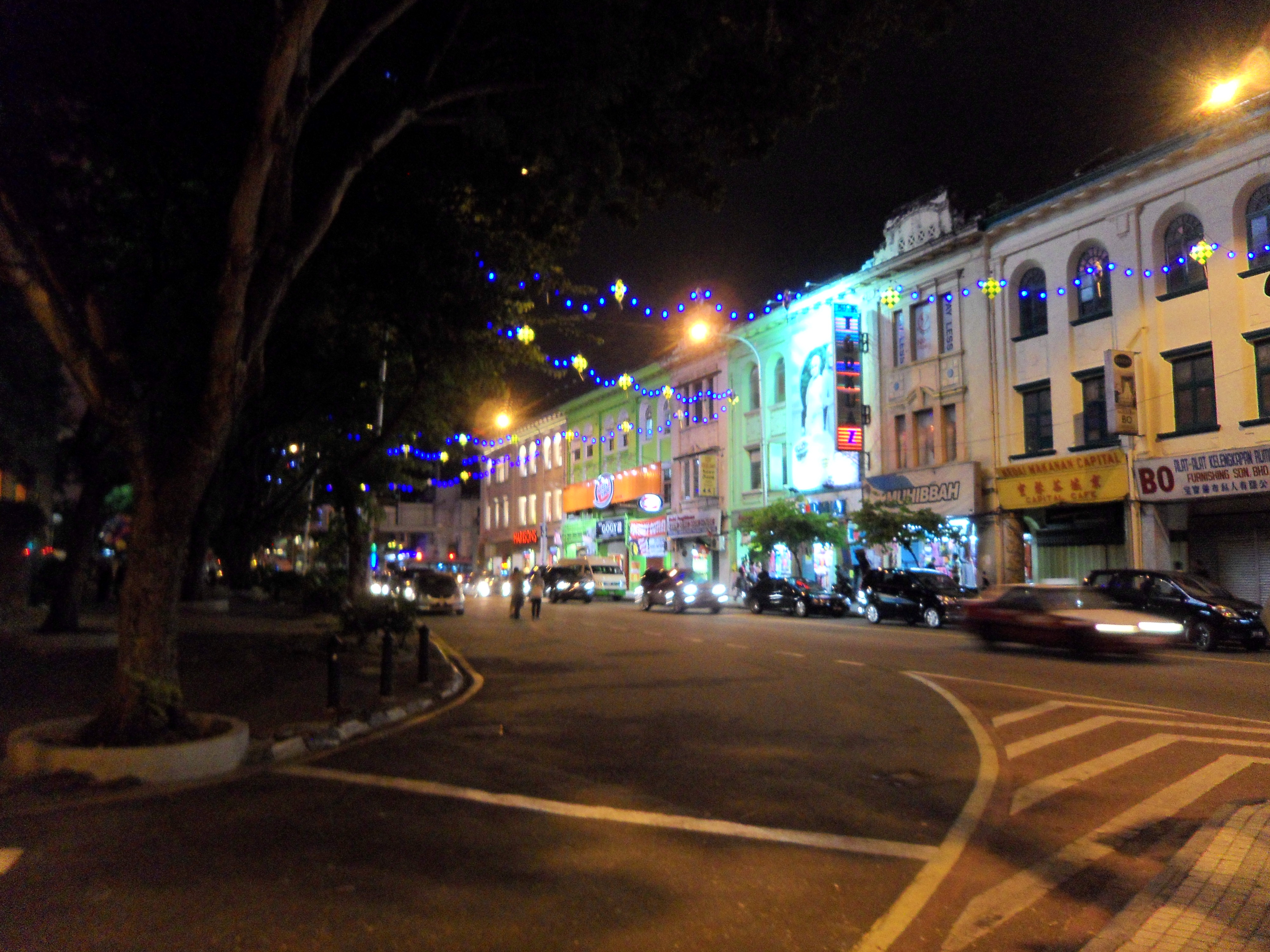
Night view

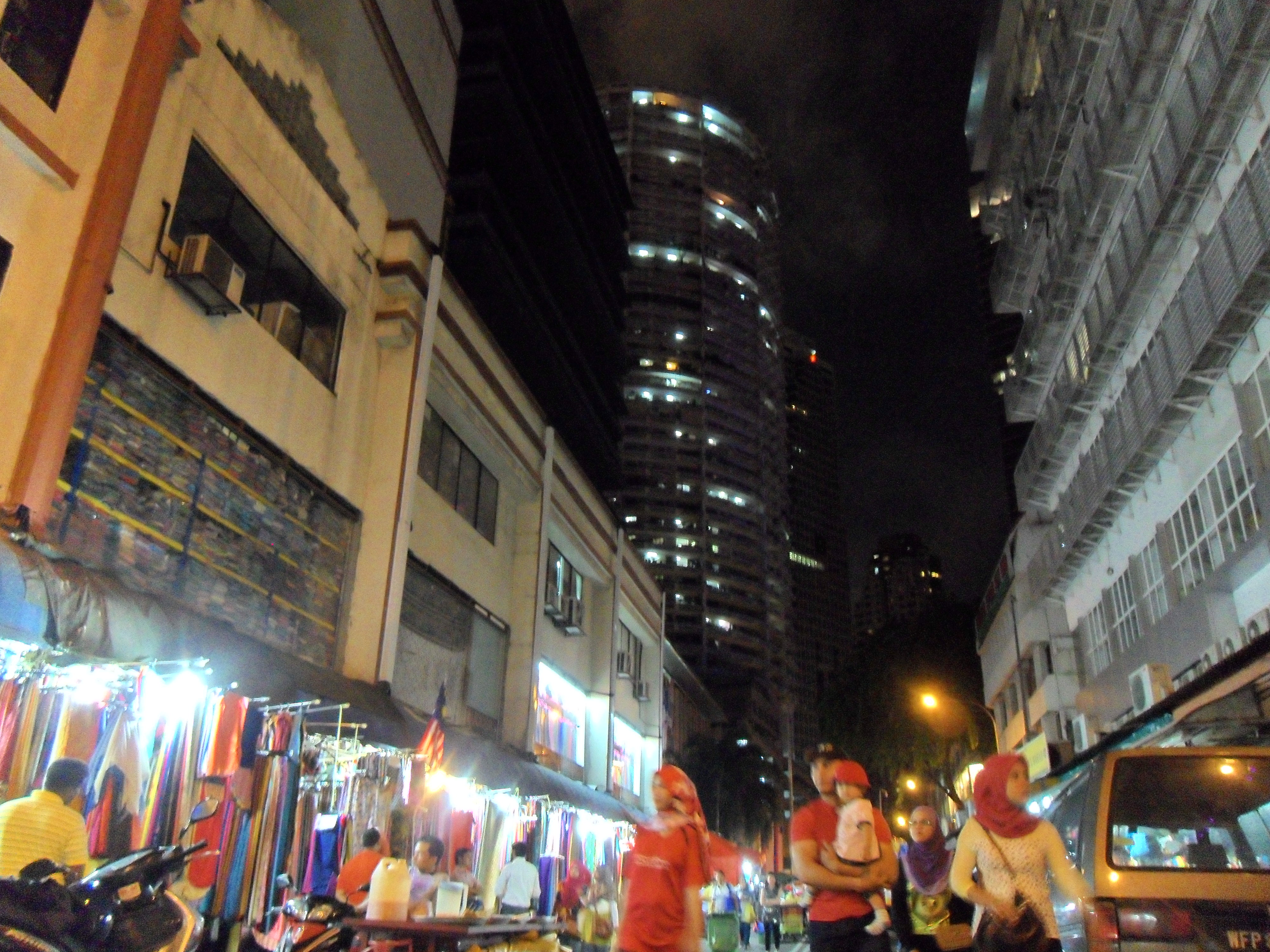
Intersection with Jalan Bunus 6
