= Jamek Mosque =

Mosque in Kuala Lumpur, Malaysia

Sultan Abdul Samad Jamek Mosque
- Masjid Jamek Sultan Abdul Samad مسجد جامع سلطان عبدالصمد
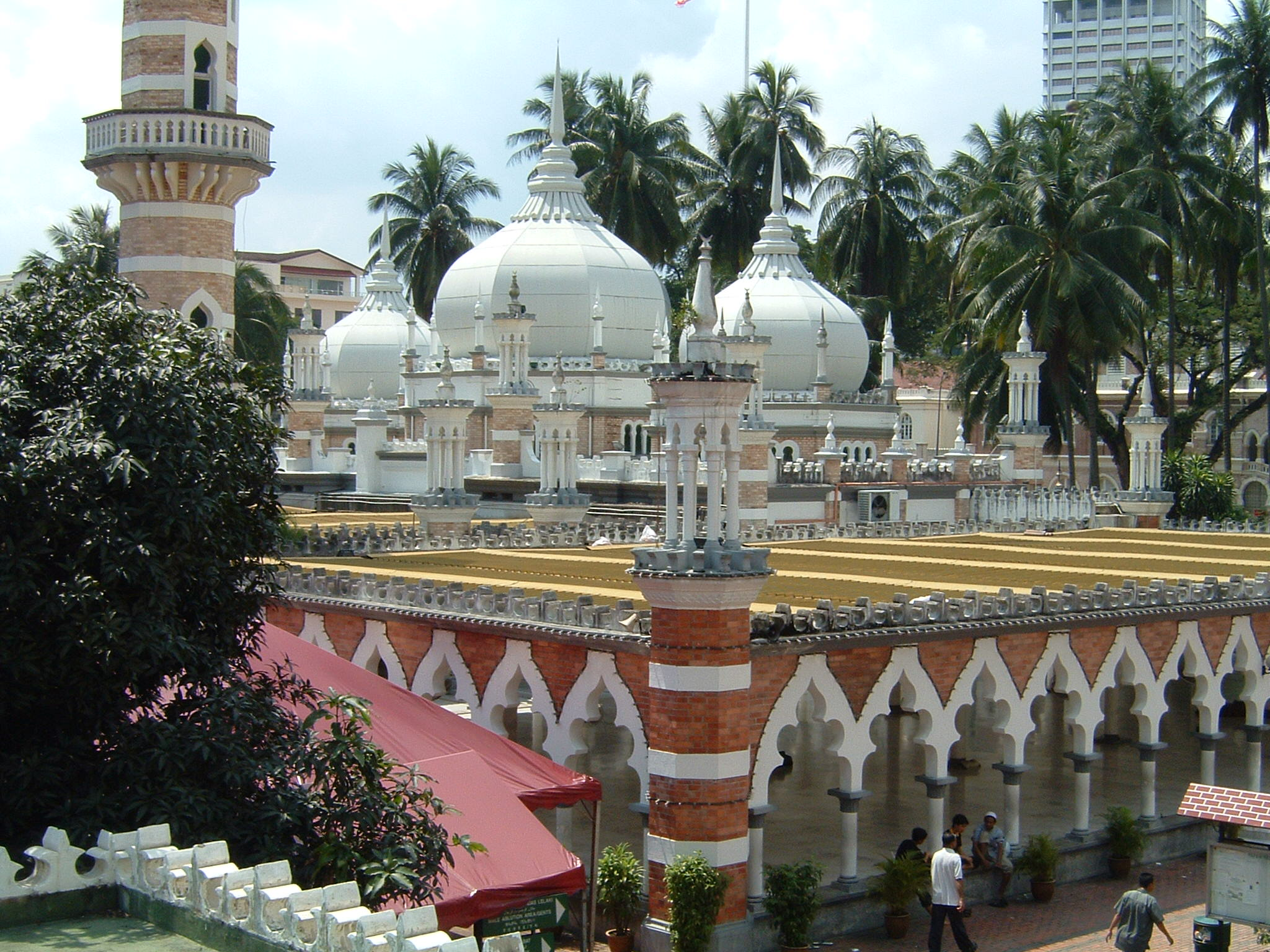
- Jamek Mosque, also known as Friday Mosque, is recognised as the oldest Islamic place of worship in Kuala Lumpur

Religion
- Affiliation: Islam
- Leadership: Imam(s): Ustaz Haji Yahya Mahyuddin bin Datuk Haji Utoh Said (2017–present)

Location
- Location: Jalan Mountbatten, Kuala Lumpur, Malaysia
- Interactive map of Sultan Abdul Samad Jamek Mosque
- Administration: Kuala Lumpur Islamic Council
- Coordinates: 3°08′56″N 101°41′45″E

Architecture
- Architect: Arthur Benison Hubback
- Style: Islamic, Moorish, Mughal
- Completed: 1909

Specifications
- Capacity: 1,000 worshipers
- Minaret: 2

Jamek Mosque, officially Sultan Abdul Samad Jamek Mosque (Malay: Masjid Jamek Sultan Abdul Samad) is one of the oldest mosques in Kuala Lumpur, Malaysia. It is located at the confluence of the Klang and Gombak rivers and may be accessed via Jalan Tun Perak. The mosque was designed by British architect and soldier Arthur Benison Hubback, and built in 1909. It was the principal mosque of Kuala Lumpur until the construction of the national mosque Masjid Negara in 1965.

The name "Jamek" is the Malay equivalent of the Arabic word jāmiʿ (جامع) meaning a place where people congregate to worship. It is also referred to as "Friday Mosque" by the locals.

== History ==
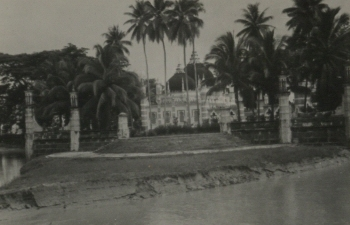
Masjid Jamek in 1935

The mosque was built on the location of an old Malay burial place at the confluence of Klang and Gombak River and named Jamek Mosque. A couple of mosques previously existed in the Java Street and Malay Street area serving the Malay communities, but Jamek Mosque was the first large mosque to be built in Kuala Lumpur. The architect was Arthur Benison Hubback who designed the mosque in the Indo-Saracenic style, loosely reflecting Indian Muslim Mughal architectural style.

The foundation stone of the mosque was laid by the Sultan of Selangor, Sultan Sir Alaeddin Sulaiman Shah on 23 March 1908, and the Sultan officially opened the mosque on 23 December 1909. The construction of the mosque cost $32,625, funded in part by the Malay community with contribution from the British colonial government. Masjid Jamek served as Kuala Lumpur's main mosque until the national mosque, Masjid Negara, was built in 1965.

The mosque has since been expanded with extensions built, and the addition of a roof over the originally open-air forecourt. The mosque was refurbished in 1984 and the minaret nearest the river was underpinned as it was already sloping. One of the domes of the mosque collapsed in 1993 due to heavy rain, but has since been repaired.

On 23 June 2017, the mosque was renamed Sultan Abdul Samad Jamek Mosque by Selangor's Sultan Sharafuddin Idris Shah after his ancestor — the fourth Sultan of Selangor Sultan Abdul Samad — as the mosque was originally built on land that was part of the state of Selangor.

== Features ==
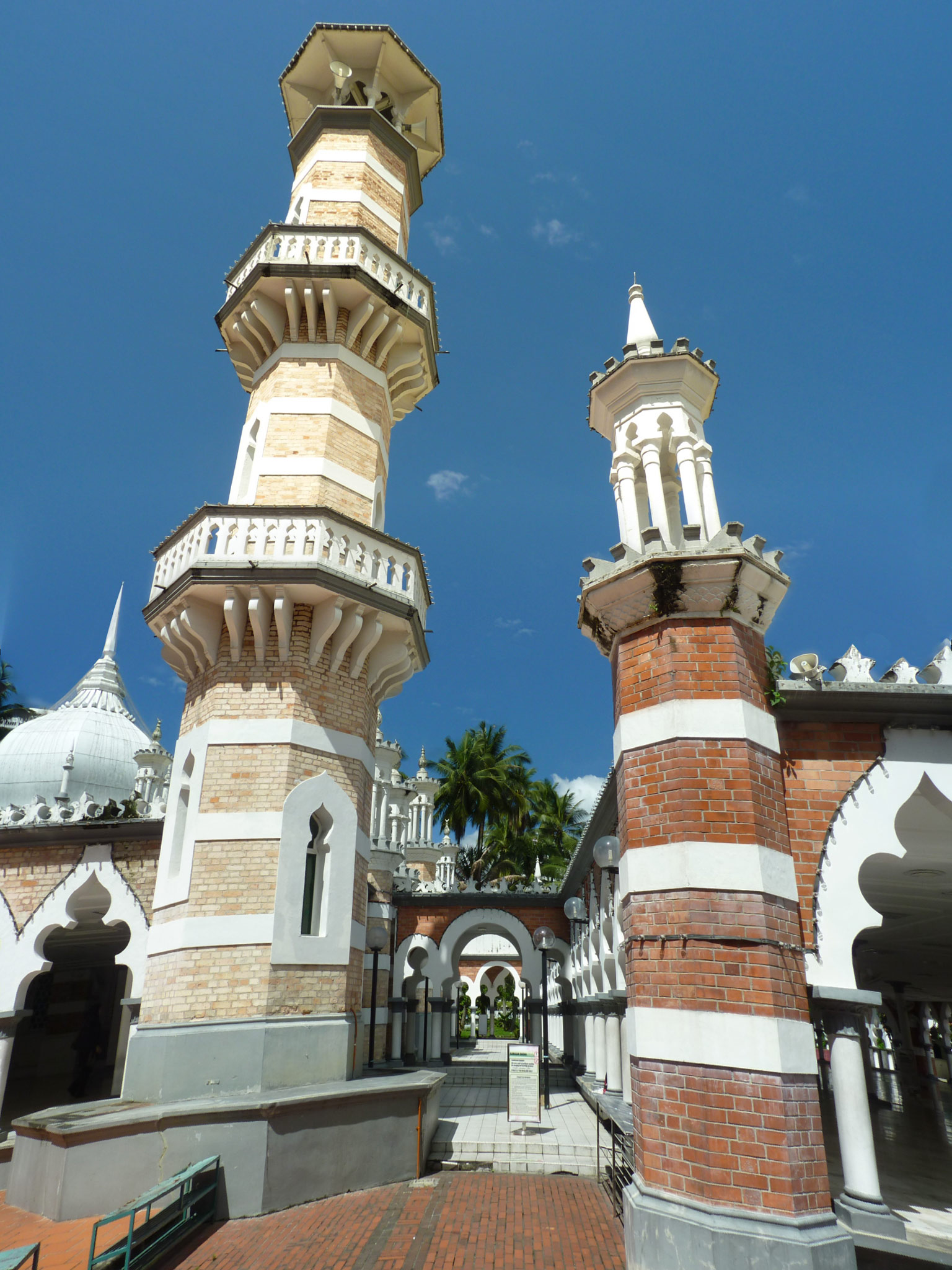
Original part (left) and extension (right) of Jamek mosque exhibiting differently coloured bricks.

The design of the mosque has been described as a Moorish, Indo-Saracenic or Mughal architecture. A. B Hubback also designed a number of buildings in similar style, such as the Kuala Lumpur railway station and the Ubudiah Mosque in Kuala Kangsar. The mosque has 2 main minarets among other smaller ones; the pattern of pink and white banding of the minarets, formed of brick and plaster, has been described as "blood and bandage". The mosque has 3 domes, the largest of which reached 21.3 metres (70 ft) in height. The prayer hall is located beneath the domes.

== Access ==
The mosque lends its name to the Masjid Jamek LRT station located just outside the mosque compound. The station is among Kuala Lumpur's busiest metro interchanges, being served by the Kelana Jaya Line, Sri Petaling Line and Ampang Line. The station is located between Chinatown and Little India; Dataran Merdeka is also nearby.

== Imams and Muadhins of Jamek Mosque ==
=== Imams ===
- Chief of Imams Sultan Abdul Samad Jamek Mosque:
  - Ustaz Hj. Muhammad bin Awang Besar (1976–1995)
  - Ustaz Ahmad Tarmizi bin Abdul Razak
  - Ustaz Mohd Saiful Azhar (2010)
  - Ustaz Mohd Faisal bin Tan Mutallib (2010–Nov 2017)
  - Ustaz Haji Yahya Mahyuddin bin Datuk Haji Utoh Said (Dec 2017–May 2023))
  - Ustaz Haji Ahmad Rosidi bin Mohmad (Jun 2023–present)
- Imams:
  - Ustaz Late Hj. Abdul Halim bin Yatim (1994–12 December 2018)
  - Ustaz Mohd Zamri bin Shafie (2004–2013)
  - Ustaz Mohd Hisyam bin Azman (2012–2013)
  - Ustaz Mohd Syukri bin Ismail (2012–31 December 2019)
  - Ustaz Ahmad Nizzam bin Rasali (2014–present)
  - Ustaz Ahmad Firdaus bin Nordin (2013–2014)
  - Ustaz Abdul Razak bin Ismail (Feb 2015–2016)
  - Ustaz Muhammad Farhan bin Nasharuddin (Feb 2015–present)
  - Ustaz Muhammad Adeeb bin Nasharuddin (November 2017–present)
  - Ustaz Luqman Bin Abdul Majid (1 Feb 2020–present)

=== Muadhins ===
Chief Of Muadhins:

- Ustaz Mohd Izwan bin Sharif (Until Nov 2014)
- Ustaz Nor Azaruddin bin Ahmad (2014 - now)
- Ustaz Azli bin Ibrahim (2019 - now)

Muadhins:

- Ustaz Mohd Al-Shahqafi (2011-2012)
- Ustaz Mohd Syukri bin Ismail (December 2011-July 2012)
- Ustaz Muhammad Hafiz bin Mohd Arif (Since July 2012 – present)
- Ustaz Mohd Farhan bin Nasharuddin (Since Jun 2013-Jan 2015)
- Ustaz Mohd Raizal (2013-2014)
- Ustaz Ahmad Sayuti bin Ismail (Since Feb 2015-2016)
- Ustaz Haji Syed Hasri bin Syed Omar Al-Habsyi (Jan-December 2017)
- Ustaz Zulfadli bin Jaafar (2018-now)
- Ustaz Azmarul Husnika (Since November 2017 – present)

== See also ==
- Islam in Malaysia
- Islamic architecture

== Gallery ==
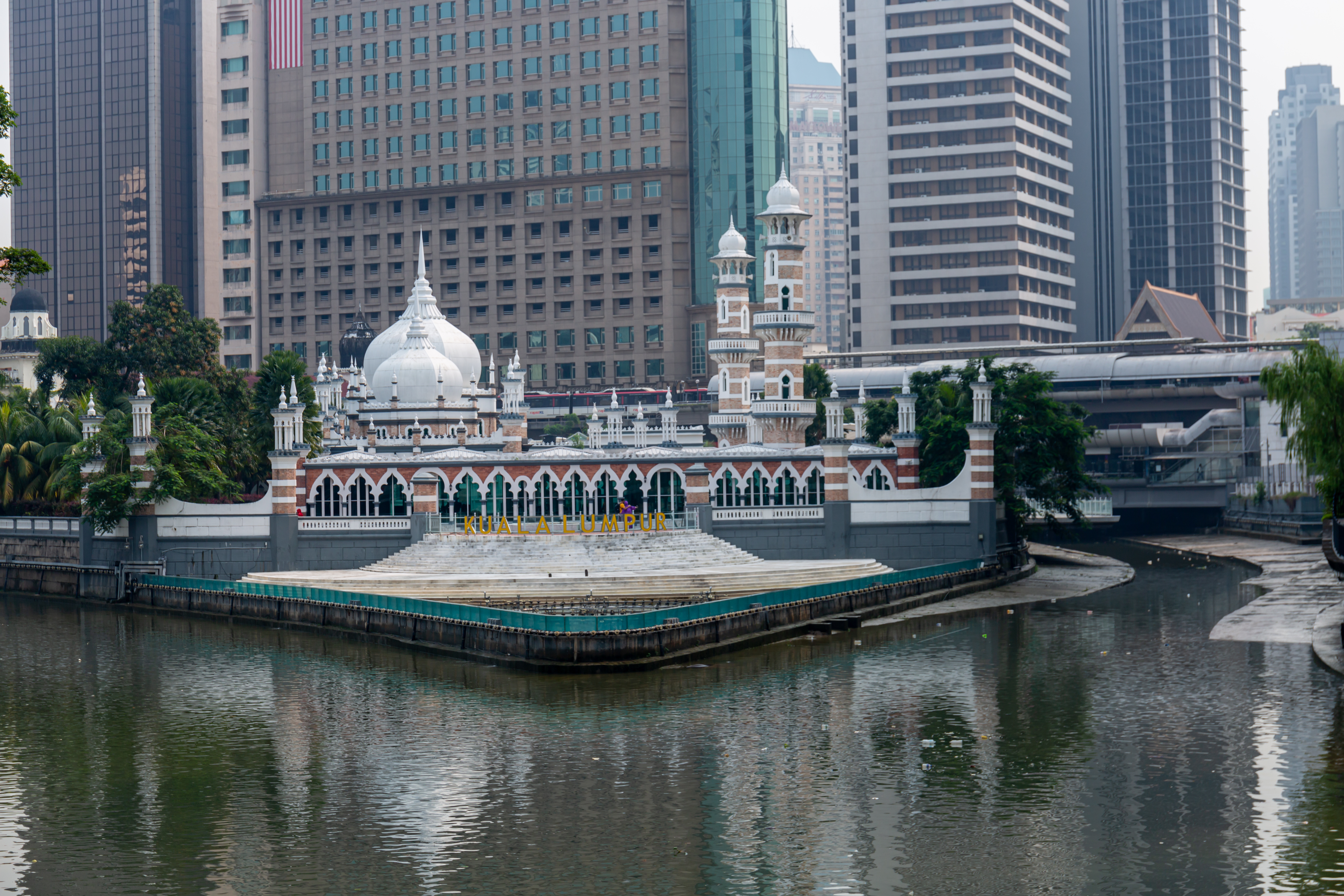
View of the mosque at the confluence of Gombak and Klang rivers

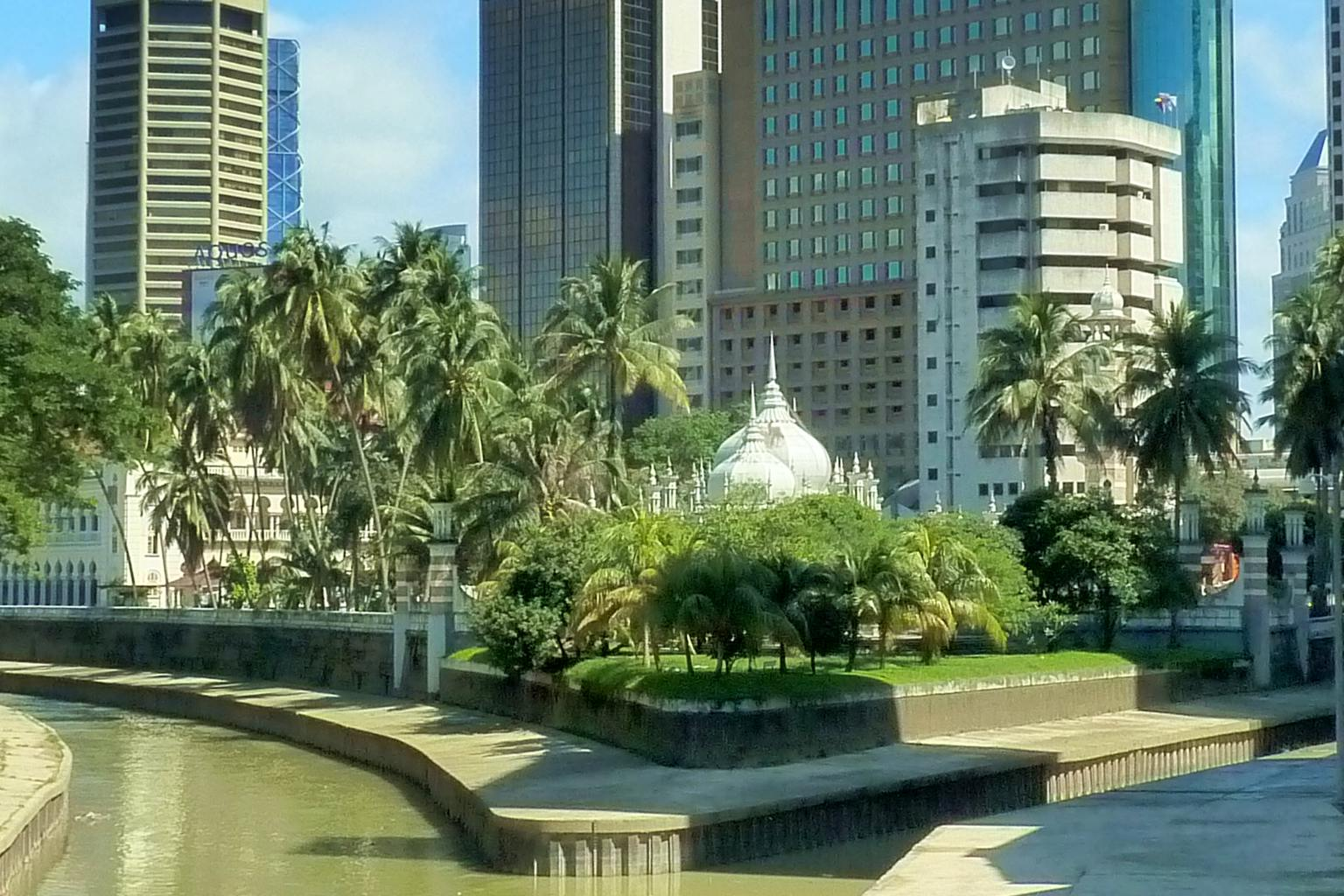
View of Jamek mosque and the confluence of Gombak and Klang rivers in 2011

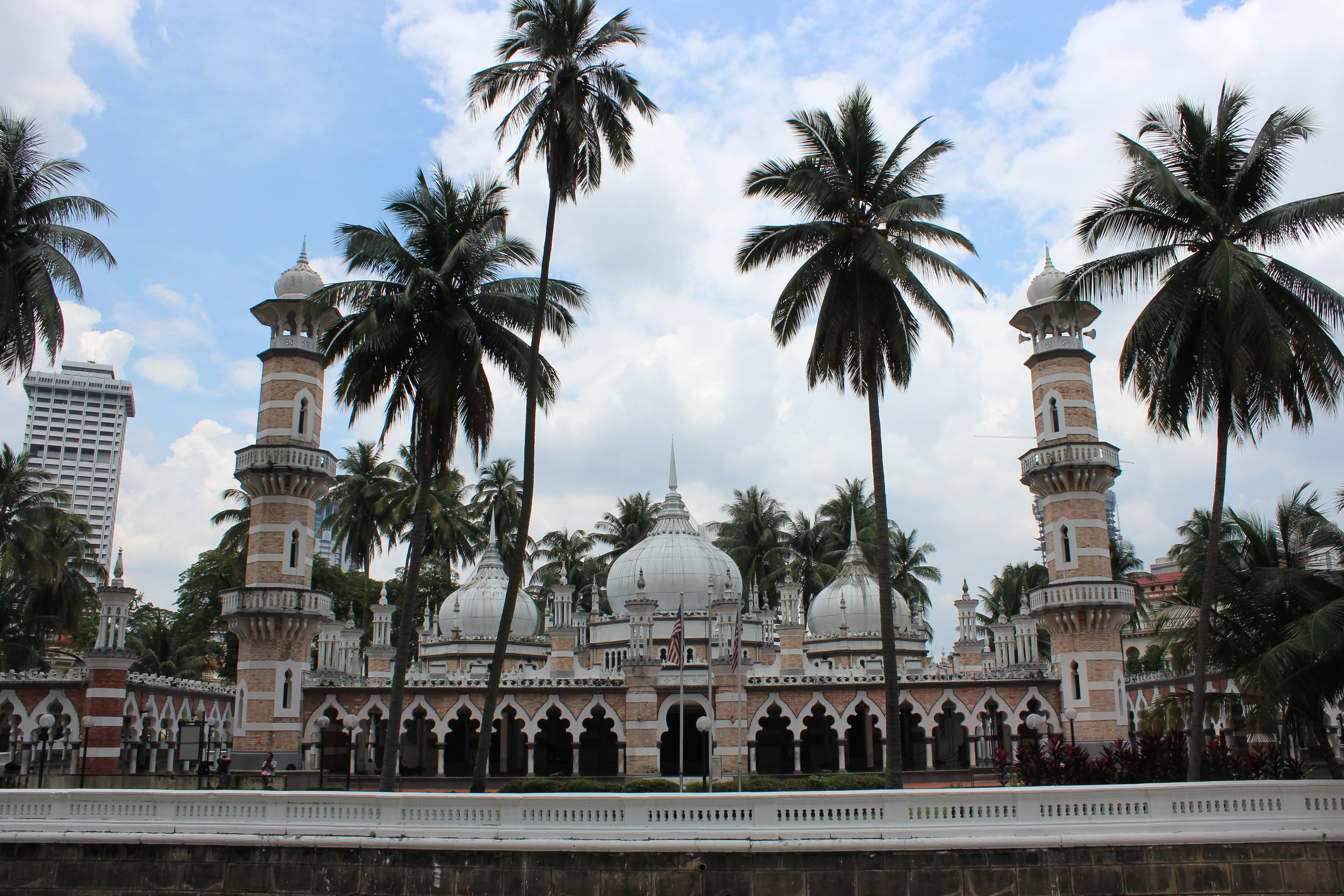
View of Jamek mosque from across the river

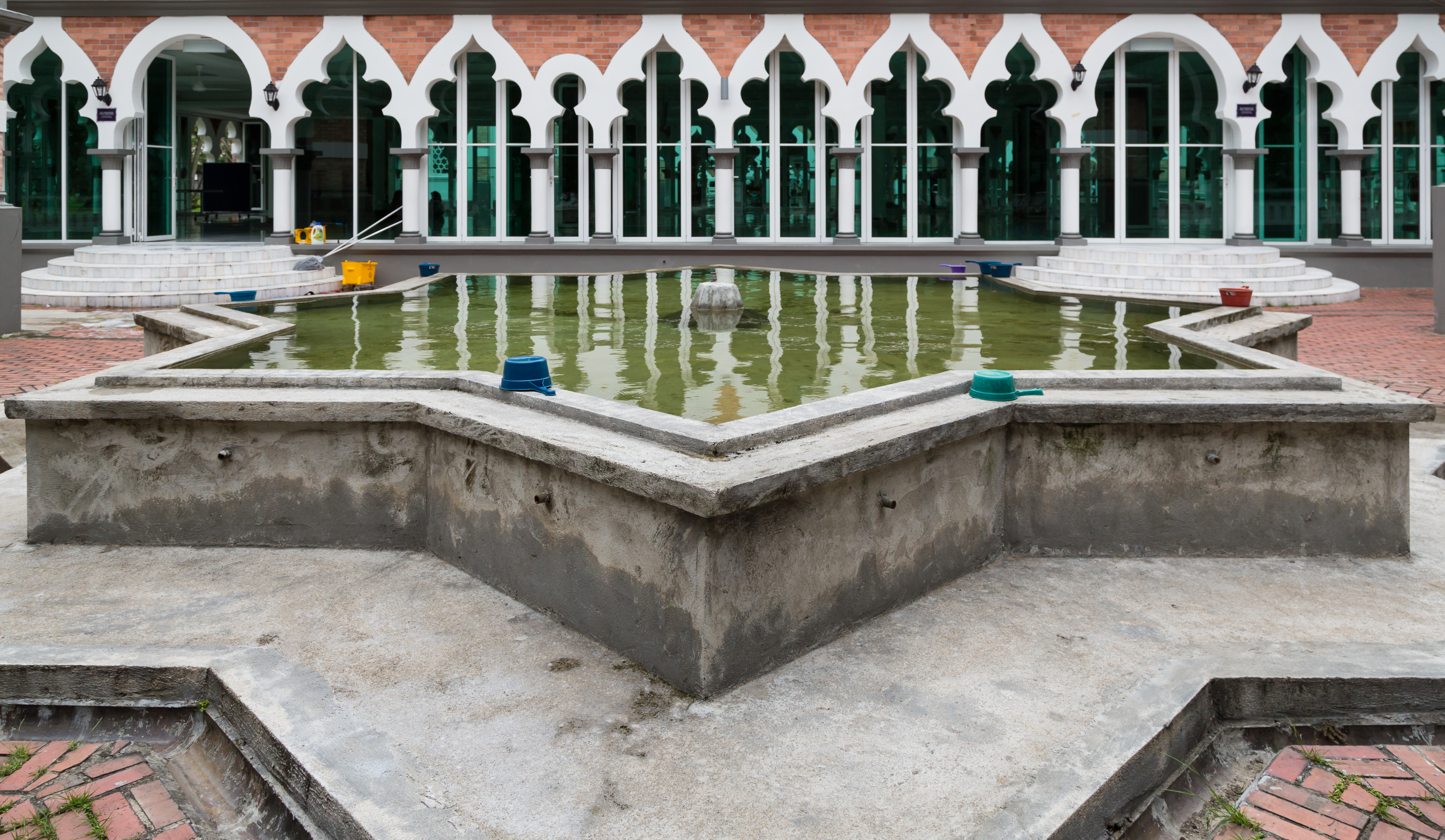
Ablution place

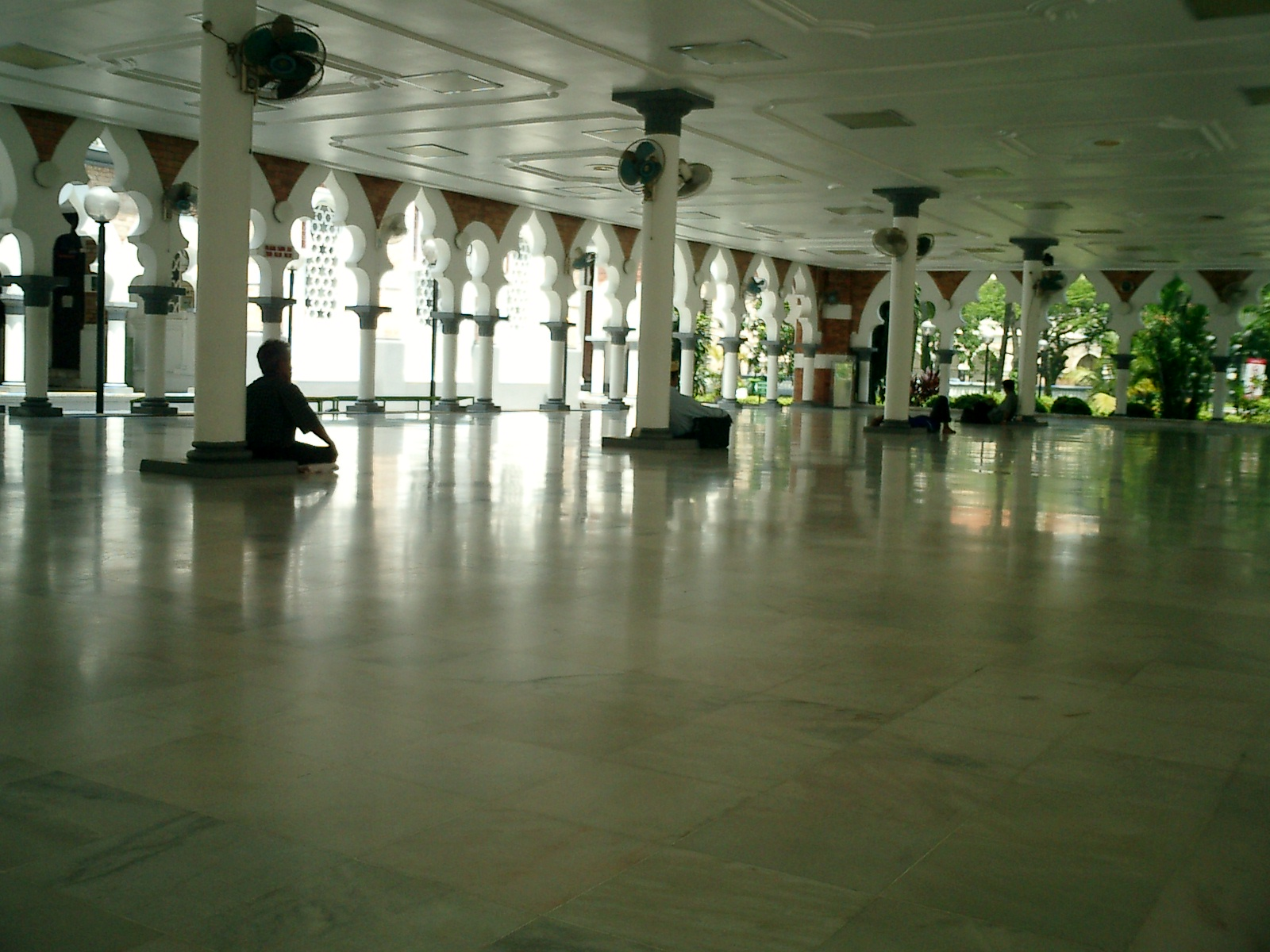
Prayer Hall

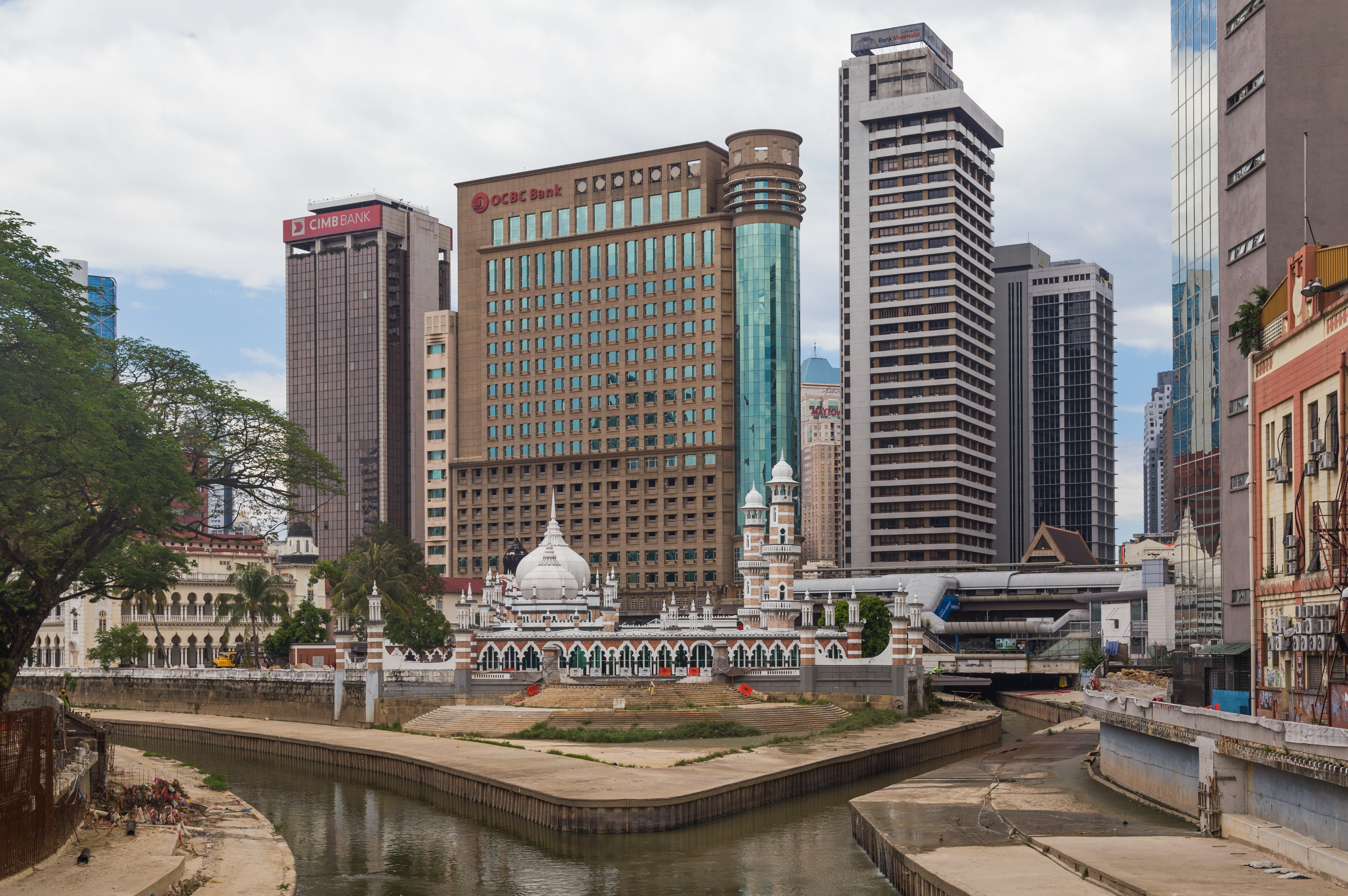
Under Construction during 2016

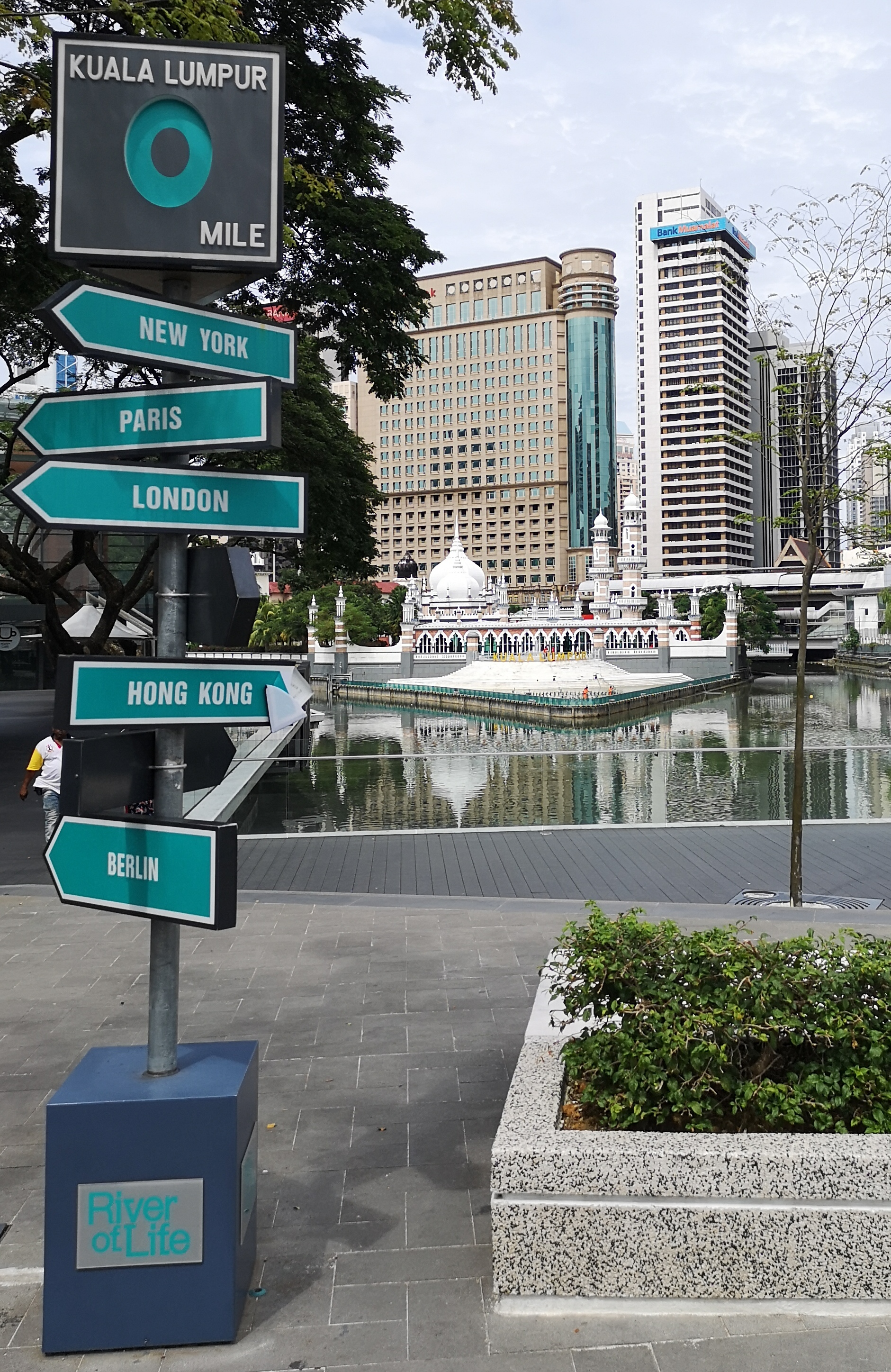
Zero Mile Pillar with a view of Jamek mosque at the confluence of Gombak and Klang rivers in the background
