= Jalan Raja Laut =

Road in Malaysia

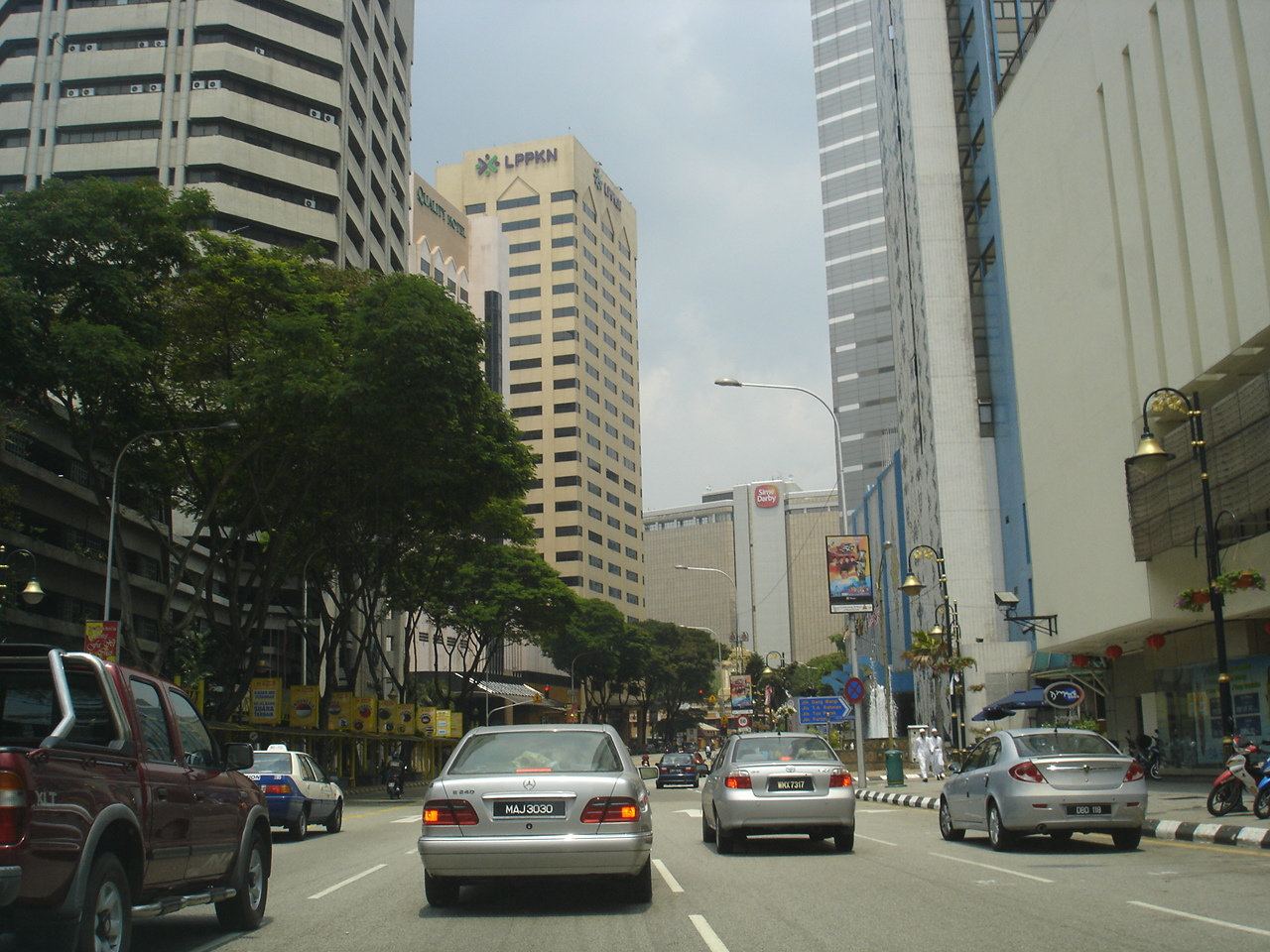

Major junctions
- South end: Jalan Tun Perak
- Jalan Tun Perak; Jalan Dang Wangi; Kuala Lumpur Inner Ring Road (Jalan Sultan Ismail); Jalan Putra; Jalan Ipoh
- North end: Jalan Ipoh

Location
- Country: Malaysia
- Primary destinations: Chow Kit; Sentul

Highway system
- Highways in Malaysia; Expressways; Federal; State

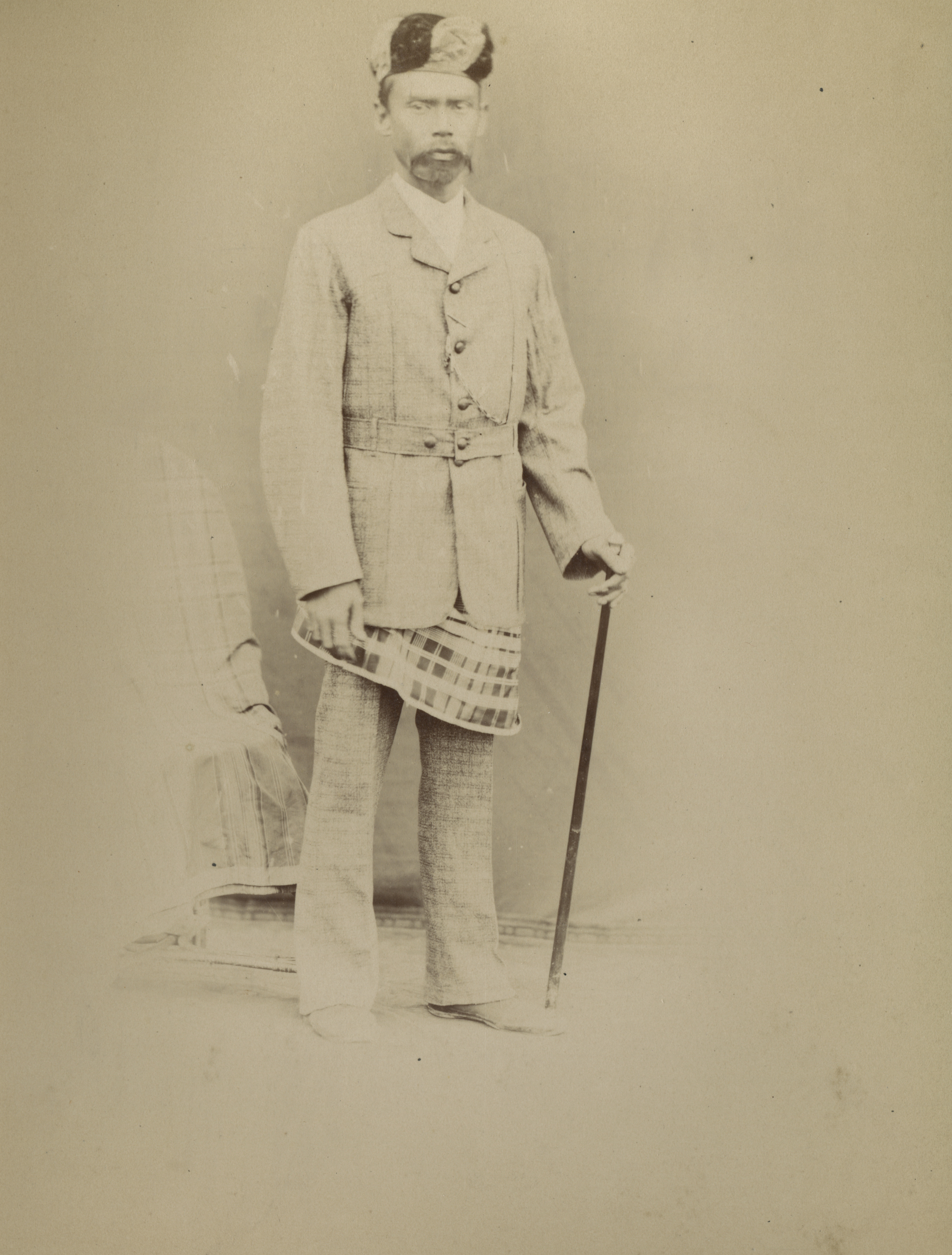
Raja Laut

Jalan Raja Laut is a major road in Kuala Lumpur, Malaysia. It was named after the Penghulu (chief or governor) of Kuala Lumpur, Raja Laut.

It is a one-way road, northward only, from Jalan Raja to Jalan Sultan Ismail. It is parallel to Jalan Tunku Abdul Rahman, another one-way road albeit southward only.

== Landmarks ==
- Dewan Bandaraya Kuala Lumpur
- Menara EON Bank (also known as Menara Raja Laut)
- SOGO Department Store
- EPF headquarters
- MARA Building
- FELDA Global Ventures building
- Bandaraya and Sultan Ismail LRT stations
- The Plaza Hotel

== List of junctions ==
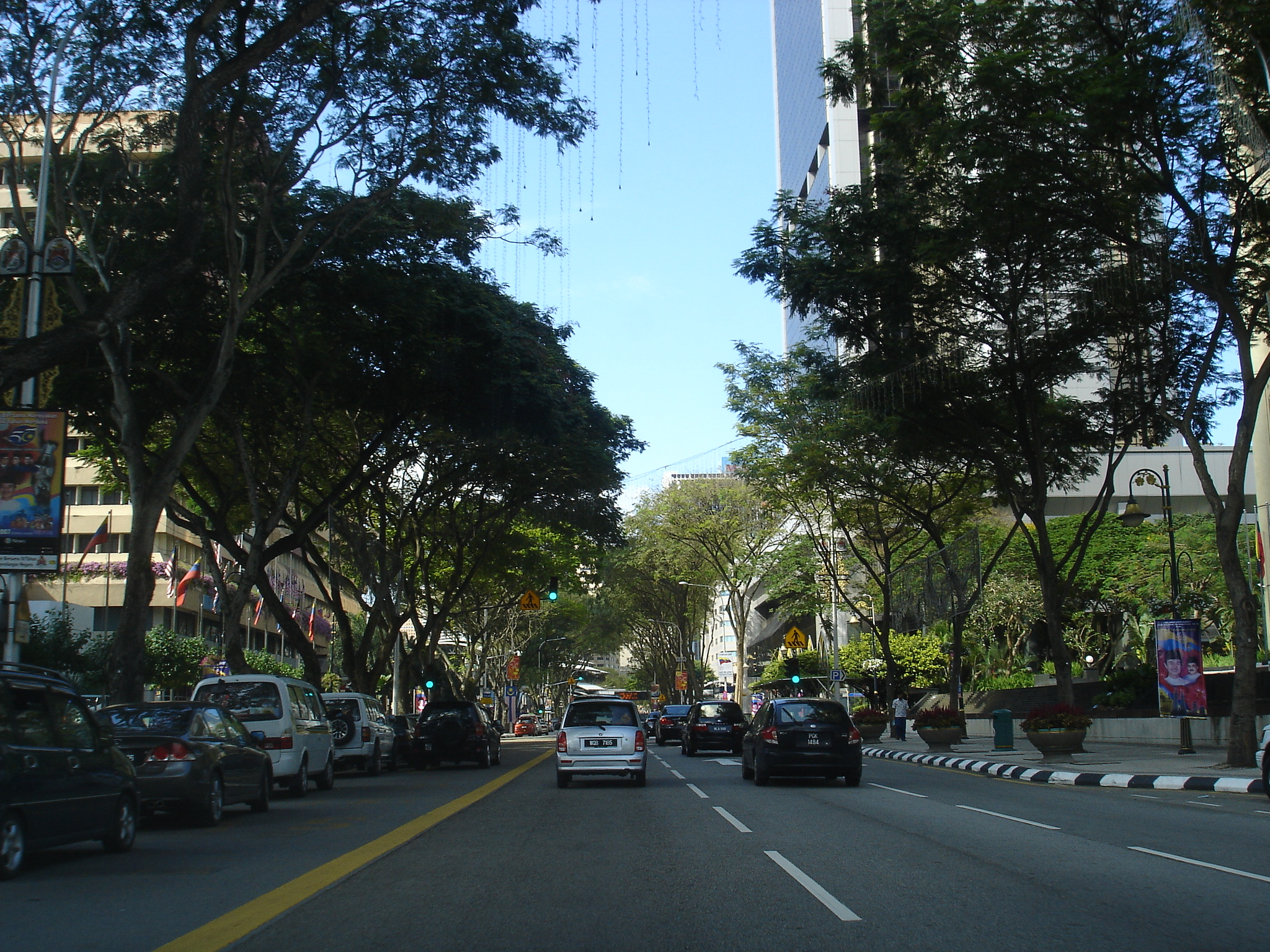
Jalan Raja Laut in Kuala Lumpur on a typical weekday afternoon.

km	Exit	Junctions	To	Remarks
		Jalan Tun Perak		
Jalan Raja Laut
		Dewan Bandaraya Kuala Lumpur (DBKL) city hall	Drive in tax counter	
		Menara Tun Razak		
		Wisma PKNS		
		KWSP (EPF) Building		
		Bandaraya LRT station	Ampang Line; Sri Petaling Line	
		Jalan Esfahan	East; Jalan Esfahan (Jalan Selat)	No entry
		Sogo shopping complex (formerly Sulaiman Courts flat)		
		Jalan Dang Wangi	East; Jalan Dang Wangi (Jalan Campbell)	No entry
		Jalan Semarang	East; Jalan Semarang (Jalan Broadrick); Jalan Tuanku Abdul Rahman; Jalan Dang Wangi; Kompleks Pertama	T-junctions
		Medan MARA		
		Menara Tun Ismail Mohd Ali		
		Sekolah Kebangsaan (Lelaki) Jalan Batu		
		Jalan Sultan Ismail	Kuala Lumpur Inner Ring Road; Jalan Sultan Ismail West; Jalan Kuching; FT 1 Ipoh East; Jalan Tuanku Abdul Rahman; Kampung Baru; Jalan Ampang; KLCC; Jalan P. Ramlee; Jalan Bukit Bintang	Junctions
		Wisma Sime Darby		
		Jalan Sri Amar	East; Jalan Sri Amar	T-junctions
		Jalan Haji Taib	East; Jalan Haji Taib; Bazar Haji Taib	T-junctions; No entry
		Jalan Putra	Jalan Putra; West Only; Putra World Trade Centre (PWTC)	Junctions
Jalan Raja Laut
Jalan Ipoh
		Jalan Ipoh	Jalan Ipoh Northwest; Sentul; Segambut Northeast; FT 2 Genting Klang-Pahang Highway; Jalan Pahang; Setapak; FT 2 Kuantan; Jalan Raja Muda Abdul Aziz (Princes Road); Kampung Baru; Jalan Semarak; Jalan Tun Razak (KLMRR I); Hospital Kuala Lumpur	T-junctions
