= Malaysian Houses of Parliament =

Federal government complex in Kuala Lumpur, Malaysia

- Malay: Bangunan Parlimen Malaysia
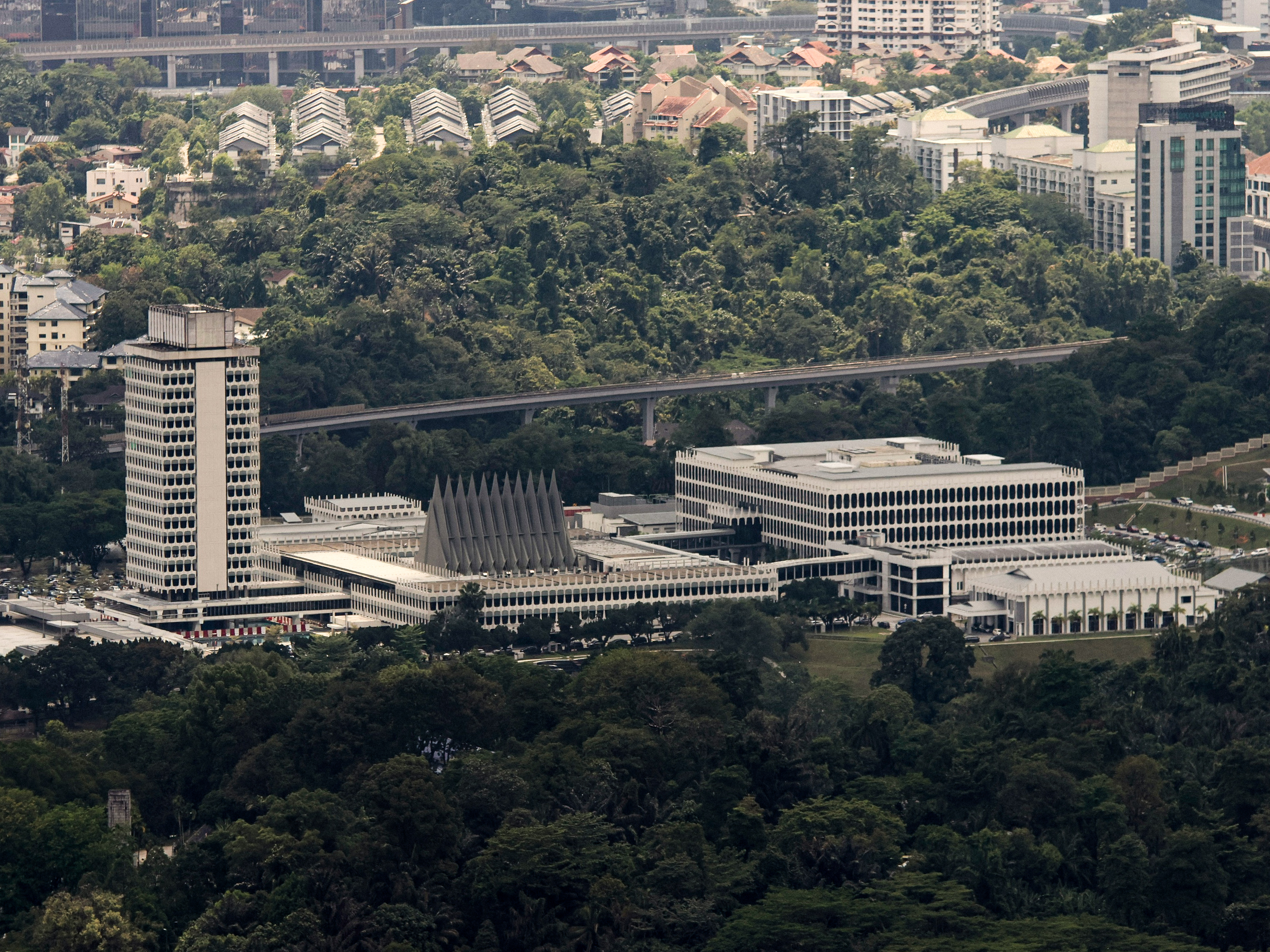
- The Malaysian Parliament viewed from the Kuala Lumpur Tower, 2023
- Interactive map of the Malaysian Houses of Parliament area
- Alternative names: Parliament House

General information
- Type: Federal government legislative building
- Architectural style: Modernist
- Location: Jalan Parlimen, Kuala Lumpur, Malaysia
- Groundbreaking: 31 August 1962; 64 years ago
- Construction started: October 1960; 65 years ago
- Opened: 2 November 1963; 62 years ago
- Renovated: February 2004; 22 years ago

Technical details
- Floor count: 17 (Tower Block); 3 (Main Block)

Design and construction
- Architects: Sir William Ivor Shipley (Malaysian Public Works Department, JKR)

The Malaysian Houses of Parliament (Malay: Bangunan Parlimen Malaysia), also known as the Parliament House, is a complex where the Malaysian Parliament assembles. The structure is located at the Perdana Botanical Gardens in Kuala Lumpur, close to the Malaysian National Monument.

== History ==
=== Proposal, planning and design ===
The construction of the current Houses of Parliament building was the brainchild of Tunku Abdul Rahman, the first Malayan Prime Minister. It was referred to as Tunku's "dream castle", and is intended to be the permanent seat of the Parliament.

In September 1959, an international design competition was proposed to determined the design of the new parliament building, and the building was slated to be built on a hill overlooking the town of Kuala Lumpur.

In December 1959, a 16.2 hectares (Note: Initially reported to be 12.5 acres (5.06 hectares) in size back in April 1960.) site on the West Folly Hill in the Lake Gardens was selected as the site for the new building, however it was not revealed to the public at the time. In March 1960, William Ivor Shipley, a British architect from the Public Works Department was assigned to lead the project.

On 6 April 1960, the government announced that the new parliament complex will be built on a hill in the Lake Gardens, which will later be known as the Parliament Hill. The design of the parliament complex was not yet determined, but was expected to incorporate Islamic architectural features.

It was also announced that the palaces for the Sultans of Kedah and Perak on the hill will be relocated. A RM2 million road systems would also be constructed to connect the town of Kuala Lumpur towards the hill, which would commenced from April until August 1960, except for the viaduct portion that passed over the Swettenham Road, in which the cost was not disclosed and its construction would only begin after the other portions have been completed.

Meanwhile on 9 April, Ivor Shipley, the main architect for the new parliament building left for India and Pakistan on a 11-day tour to study the architecture styles of parliamentary buildings there. His planned destinations include New Delhi, Chandigarh, and Lahore. He also disclosed that the new parliament building for Malaya may not necessarily feature Islamic styles, and he was given a free hand by the government to design the new building. He said that a contemporary style may well be more suitable for the building. Malaya's tropical climate will also be given prioritised consideration when designing the new Parliament House, and the building will be air-conditioned.

Upon his return, a five-man team led by Shipley worked on the architectural sketches for the new parliament building for two months and later submitted them to the government for deliberations. The designs was expected to be decided on by the end of July 1960, but was only disclosed to the public on 2 October that year.

On 2 October 1960, the government in a statement said the new parliament house will have pools and lawns in the building to form "hanging gardens" on several levels, which is a moden trend to "use water as a cooling medium in tropical buildings and green grass to give rest to the eyes". Prime Minister Tunku Abdul Rahman had also inspected a model that featured the exteriors of the buildings, and greenlighted further design development. A model that showcases the exteriors and interiors of the new parliament building was also expected to be built within 6 to 9 months for public viewing.

It also revealed that a 15-storey tower will be built, which will incorporate a special balcony to allow the observation of ceremonies held on the 4-acres open space in front of it, and its top floor balcony will give a clear view of Kuala Lumpur's skyline. The building will be covered in grill-like facade in two layers, which would give structural strength as well well as cooling-off the building. Heat-absorbing glass will also be used in parts of the facade. The Senate chamber would be 30 feet high with a 90 ft × 56 ft floor size, while the House of Representatives chamber would be much larger in size.

=== Construction ===
Construction on the site had commenced by October 1960, according to The Straits Times reports at the time, however an article in The Ingenieur engineering magazine placed the starting year of construction on 1961. In November 1961, the cenotaph near the Kuala Lumpur railway station was dismantled to make way for the new road link to the new Parliament House, with its granite and marble blocks moved to the present site of the National Monument in the Lake Gardens and reconstructed there.

On 16 March 1962, the Dewan Rakyat Speaker Noah bin Omar together with the speakers of the state legislative assemblies in Malaya inspected a model for the new Parliament House.

By the end of August 1962, the viaduct over the Swettenham Road had been completed, and the construction of the 15-storey tower block has progressed until the 10th floor. The tower block would house the offices for cabinet minister, while the main block would house the two legislative chambers, a library, a banquet hall, dining rooms and committee rooms. The two buildings would be connected by two cantilever bridges. According to the estimate at the time, the construction would cost RM10.6 million while the buildings would occupied 7 acres (2.83 hectares) of land, with their completion expected by the end of 1963.

On 31 August 1962, the 5th national day for Malaya, the Yang di-Pertuan Agong Tuanku Syed Putra Jamalullail laid the foundation stone for the underconstructing parliament complex. The marble-surfaced foundation stone, which also served as a time capsule, weights around 850 lb (385 kg). It contained copies of Malayan newspapers, currencies, hansard of the first meeting of Malayan parliament in 1958; and tin, rubber and paddy that represents the staple products of Malaya. On the same day, prime minister Tunku Abdul Rahman also announced that the building's construction cost had risen to RM16 millions due to changes in plan.

In late September 1962, the final RM12 millions phase of the construction, which involved air-conditioning, flooring, partitioning, plastering, sun-breaking, and painting, had officially begun. Phase two and three of the project that covered the tower block and the main block were also slated to be completed by February 1963, with the overall project to be finished by 31 August 1963, the national day and the initial planned date for the formation of Malaysia.

The new parliament building was to be fitted with modern sound system, which include the feature of allowing members of parliament (MPs) to listen to the debates through a pocket-sized receiver; and two closed-circuit television systems which allow the MPs to watch the proceedings outside the chambers. However, the plan for the two CCTV systems was scrapped in May 1963 as it was decided that the sound system to be installed throughout the complex would be more than suffice.

In late April 1963, a Babcock Weitz tower crane, which was the first of its kind in Malaya, was installed on top of the tower block to lift the precast terrazzo sunbreakers onto the building's facade. The tower crane was also used to lift centrifugal refrigeration machine onto the top of the tower block for installation of air-conditioning from 26 June to 28 June. By early May 1963, the pre-stressed concrete framework of the tower block had been completed, and the parliament buildings would contain roughly 363,000 sq ft of floor space. It would also contain a small circular prayer room.

On 19 May, telecommunications minister V. T. Sambanthan stated that 36 seats would be reserved for Malayan press in the press gallery of the Dewan Rakyat chamber, which would also be accompanied by a large press room, a lounge, and a canteen for reporters.

=== Delays ===
On 14 June, Ivor Shipley stated that the construction is now in its final stages, but whether the project could be completed by the 31 August 1963 deadline depends on the arrival of certain materials in the next 15 days. On 27 June, he further disclosed that a review will be held on 1 July to determine whether the project could finish on time. On 22 July, Public Works Department director S. F. Owen officially confirmed that the building would not meet the 31 August deadline due to the late arrival of those materials.

On 15 August, Shipley further revealed that the Parliament House would not be ready by mid-September 1963 as well, even if the formation of Malaysia was postponed to that date. He said that "There is no one big problem, but thousands of little ones that are preventing us from completing the building on time", and the only estimated completion date he could give is "September-October". However he stated that the state banquet planned on 2 September, which would be part of the Malaysia Day celebration, could be held at the banquet hall of the new Parliament House.

On 18 September, the state banquet for Malaysia Day celebrations was held at the new Parliament House, with the King, state rulers, the prime minister and his wife, and head of states from Sabah, Sarawak and Singapore in attendance, as well as 350 foreign dignitaries from various countries.

On 20 September, Dewan Rakyat speaker Noah bin Omar announced that the Parliament House will be officially opened on 15 October, with the British House of Commons to gift a Speaker's chair, and the New Zealand government to deliver a despatch box to Malaysia's parliament. The Australian government would also present gift to Malaysia on that day but did not disclose what item it would be. On 30 September however, Noah announced that the opening date was postponed to 2 November due to unfinished interior works in the new Parliament House. He also said that new MPs from Sabah, Sarawak and Singapore would also be sworn-in on that day.

On 23 October, prime minister Tunku Abdul Rahman and his deputy Abdul Razak Hussein went for a half hour visit at the near-completion Parliament House, and were given a tour by its architect Ivor Shipley. On 31 October, two days before the official opening, Noah visited the building, while construction workers were still carrying out finishing works for the building.

During the two-years long construction period, Tunku Abdul Rahman was reported to had taken frequent evening drives to the Lake Gardens to view the progress of the new Parliament House.

=== Opening ===
On 2 November 1963, the new Parliament House was officiated by Tuanku Syed Putra Jamalullail, the third Yang di-Pertuan Agong. Tunku Abdul Rahman's statue was erected near the Parliament Square on 1971. The statue was designed by an American sculptor, Felix de Weldon, who also designed the Malaysian National Monument.

== Description ==
The interior of Dewan Rakyat, the lower house.

The interior of Dewan Negara, the upper house.

The complex comprises two parts, a 3-story main building and a 17-story 77-metre-tall tower. The main building hosts the Dewan Rakyat (House of Representatives) and the Dewan Negara (Senate) while representatives' offices are located in the tower.

The complex was constructed during the period when the federal government was based in Kuala Lumpur. While the vast majority of government operations has moved to Putrajaya since the late-1990s, the parliament continues to convene at Kuala Lumpur's Parliament House.

== In Malaysian culture ==
The building has also been prominently featured on reverse of the first series cent mints alongside the first and second series M$1,000 banknotes.

== Transportation and accessibility ==
Shuttle van services to Parliament of Malaysia

The Parliament of Malaysia is currently served by the T851 free shuttle van or bus service since February 2023, which starts from the ERL departure hall of KL Sentral station. The shuttle service will also stop at the multilevel carpark of the Perdana Botanical Gardens, before heading to the Parliament House.

This shuttle service will only run when the parliament is in session and only take passenger with official business with the Parliament to the Parliament House, except during the periods of Parliament Open Day.

Even though the parliament is beside the MRT Kajang Line in between Semantan and Muzium Negara station, there is no plan to create a station at the area before the rail goes underground.

== Gallery ==
The statue of Tunku Abdul Rahman in front of the Parliament office block.

The parliament square, the place for the inspection of guard of honour by King during the opening ceremony of the first parliamentary session.

The parliament library.

== See also ==
- Perdana Putra, federal government administrative building in Putrajaya
