= Suleiman Courts =

Suleiman Court

General information
- Type: High-rise apartment building
- Architectural style: Modernist
- Location: Batu Road, (now Jalan Tuanku Abdul Rahman), Kuala Lumpur, Malaysia
- Construction started: 1957
- Estimated completion: 1958

Suleiman Court was the first high-rise apartment building in Kuala Lumpur, Malaysia. The building was constructed at the direction of Malaysia's first Prime Minister, Tunku Abdul Rahman, who intended the Courts to provide affordable housing. The Courts was named after Suleiman bin Abdul Rahman, then incumbent Minister of Interior & Justice, who had watched over the progress of the Housing Trust for 8 years since its inception.

The Courts were built in 1957, as the Federation of Malaya neared official independence from the United Kingdom. Tunku Abdul Rahman had hoped for the building to be not just complete, but already occupied, in time for Hari Merdeka (the official proclamation of independence) on 31 August; however, the first apartments were not occupied until February 1958.

The three blocks of the Courts (Block A, Block B, and Block C) were located on Batu Road (now Jalan Tuanku Abdul Rahman), and had 295 apartments between them. They were demolished in 1986, to make room for the Sogo shopping complex.
