= National History Museum (Malaysia) =

Museum in Kuala Lumpur, Malaysia

- Muzium Sejarah Nasional
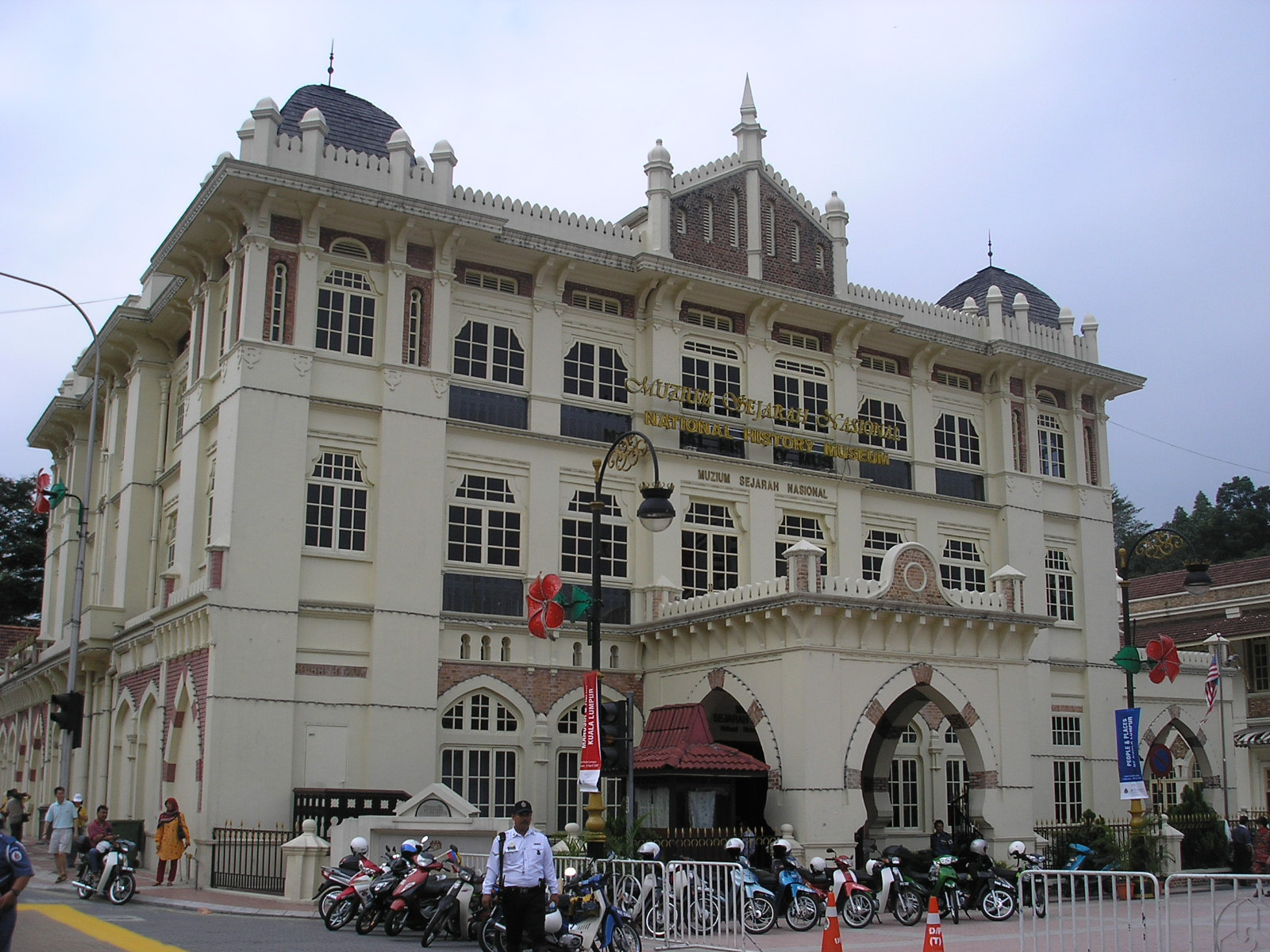
- National History Museum at Merdeka Square
- Dissolved: November 2007
- Location: Kuala Lumpur
- Coordinates: 3°08′49.4″N 101°41′37.0″E

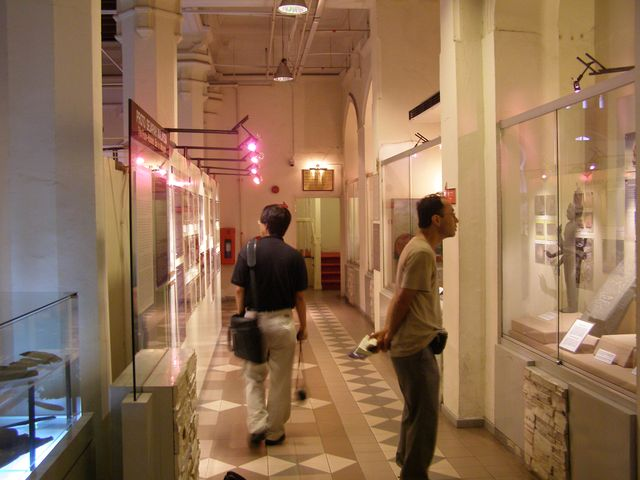
Interior of National History Museum of Kuala Lumpur.

The National History Museum (Malay: Muzium Sejarah Nasional) was the second national museum in Malaysia after the National Museum. It was located opposite Dataran Merdeka in Kuala Lumpur. It closed in November 2007, and its entire collection was moved to the National Museum.

The

National History Museum exhibited the historical development of the country from its early days to modern times. Its collection of almost a thousand items, gathered for their importance to the history of the country, was classified into several categories, including weapons, manuscripts, seals, maps, money and stone tools.

== Gallery ==
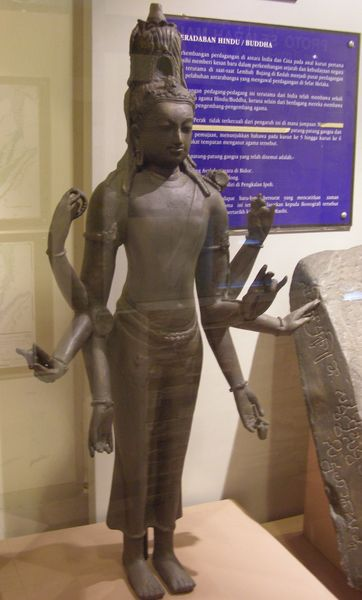
A photo taken from the National History Museum of Kuala Lumpur. An 8th-9th century bronze standing 8-armed Buddhist Avalokitesvara statue found at Anglo Oriental, Bidor, Perak tin mine in year 1936. 79 cm height.

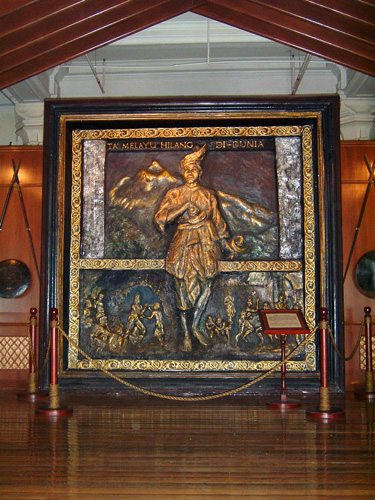
A bronze mural of Hang Tuah at the lobby

Prehistoric weapons on display

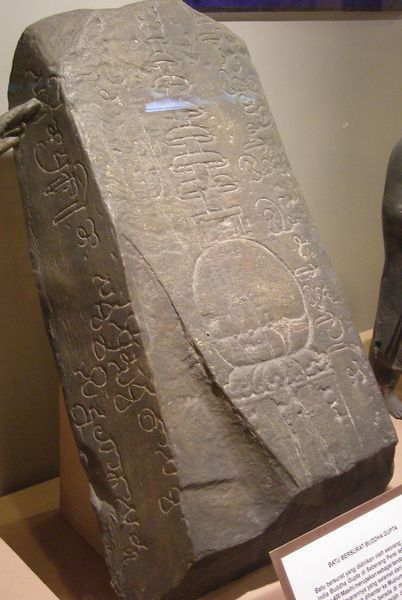
Replica of Buddhagupta stone

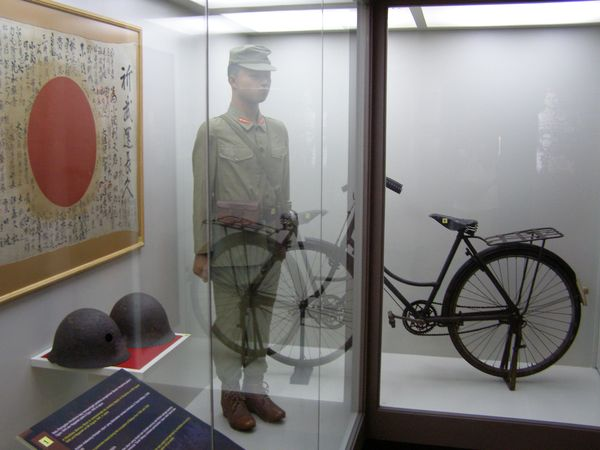
Japanese army and bicycle

Tin Animal Money

Malay Keris

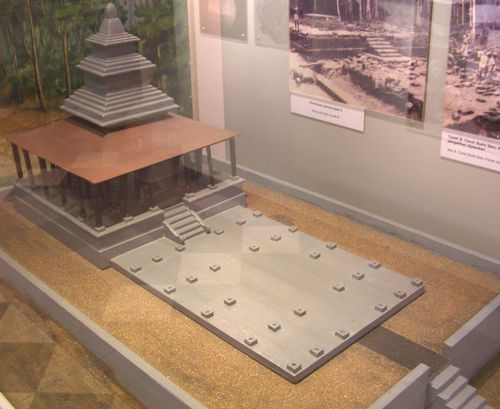
Miniature Candi of Kedah's Bujang Valley

== See also ==
- List of museums in Malaysia

== Literature ==
- Lenzi, Iola (2004). Museums of Southeast Asia. Singapore: Archipelago Press. p. 200 pages. ISBN 981-4068-96-9.
