= Ampang and Sri Petaling lines =

Malaysian passenger railway lines

LRT Ampang Line LRT Sri Petaling Line

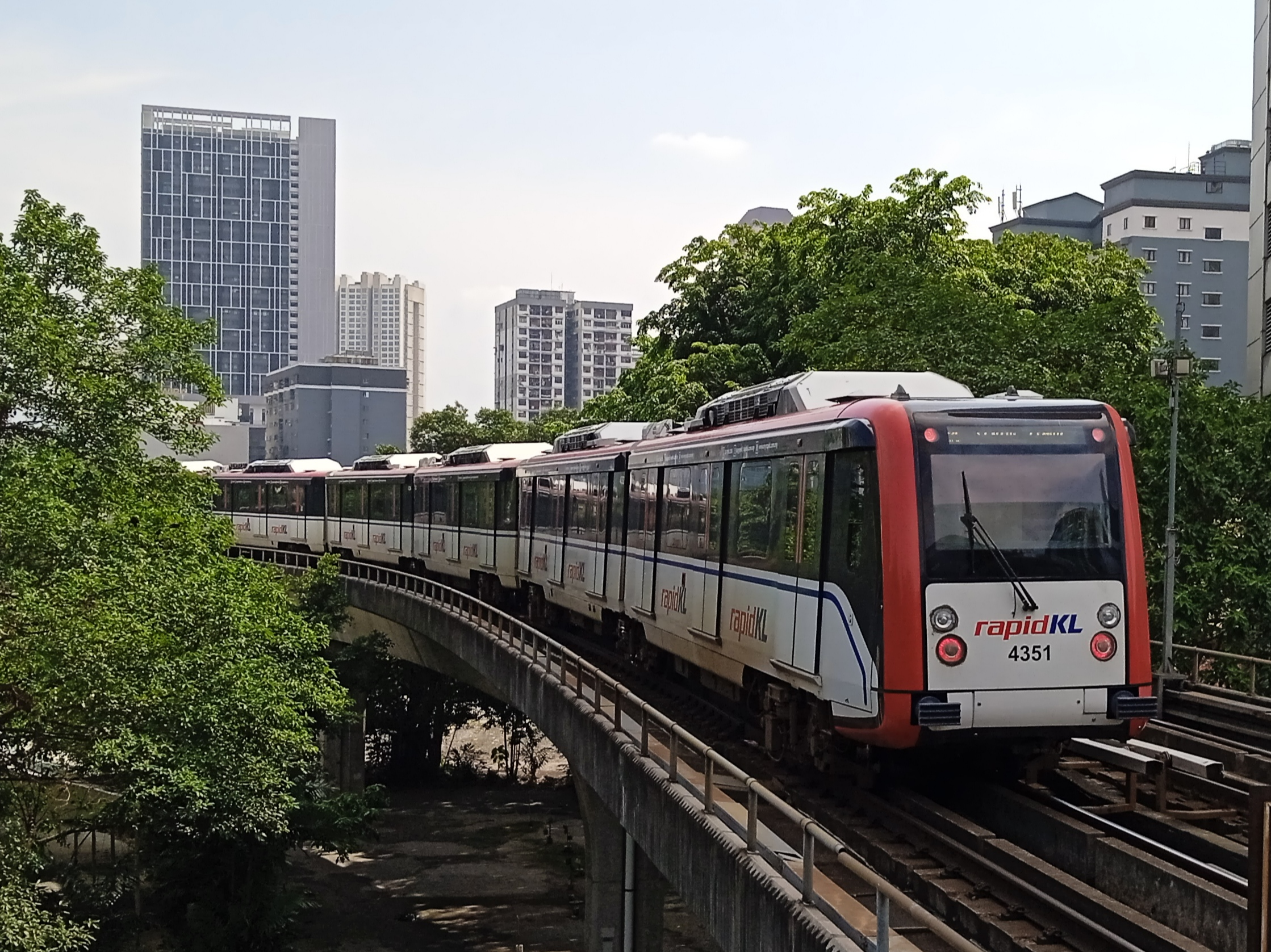
- 6-car CSR Zhuzhou Amy articulated LRV leaving Sultan Ismail

Overview
- Other name(s): LRT1, AGL, SPL, STAR Line
- Native name: LRT Laluan Ampang; LRT Laluan Sri Petaling
- Status: Operational
- Owner: Prasarana Malaysia
- Line number: 3 (orange); 4 (maroon)
- Locale: Klang Valley
- Termini: AG1 SP1 Sentul Timur; AG18 Ampang & SP31 Putra Heights
- Stations: 36 & 2 reserve
- Website: My Rapid

Service
- Type: Light rapid transit
- System: Rapid KL; Klang Valley Integrated Transit System
- Services: Ampang Line: Sentul Timur - Ampang; Sri Petaling Line: Sentul Timur - Putra Heights
- Operator: Rapid Rail
- Depot(s): Ampang Depot; Kuala Sungai Baru Depot
- Rolling stock: CSR Zhuzhou articulated LRV; 50 six-car trainsets Width: 2.65 m (8 ft 8 in) - narrow profile Length: 84.0 m (275.6 ft)
- Daily ridership: 227,048 (Q2 2026); 246,885 (2025; Highest)
- Ridership: 71.02 million (2025) (▲10.9%)

History
- Opened: Phase 1: Sultan Ismail - Ampang; 16 December 1996; 29 years ago Phase 2: Sultan Ismail - Sentul Timur & Chan Sow Lin - Sri Petaling; July 1998; 28 years ago
- Last extension: Sri Petaling - Putra Heights; 30 June 2016; 10 years ago

Technical
- Line length: 45.1 km (28.0 mi)
- Character: Elevated and at-grade
- Track gauge: 1,435 mm (4 ft 8 1/2 in) standard gauge
- Electrification: 750 V DC third rail
- Operating speed: Average: 60 km/h (37 mph)
- Signalling: SelTrac CBTC

The LRT Ampang Line and the LRT Sri Petaling Line are light rapid transit (LRT) lines in the Klang Valley, Malaysia. The combined network comprises 45.1 kilometres (28.0 mi) of tracks with 36 stations and was the first railway in Malaysia to use standard-gauge track and semi-automated trains. The lines are operated as part of the Rapid KL system by Rapid Rail, a subsidiary of Prasarana Malaysia.

A trip from one end to the other takes 41 minutes on the LRT Ampang Line, and 74 minutes on the LRT Sri Petaling Line. The LRT Ampang Line is named after its eastern terminus, Ampang station, while the LRT Sri Petaling Line is named after its former southern terminus, Sri Petaling station.

The LRT Ampang and Sri Petaling Lines form part of the Klang Valley Integrated Transit System, numbered 3 and 4, and are coloured orange and maroon on official rail maps respectively.

== History ==
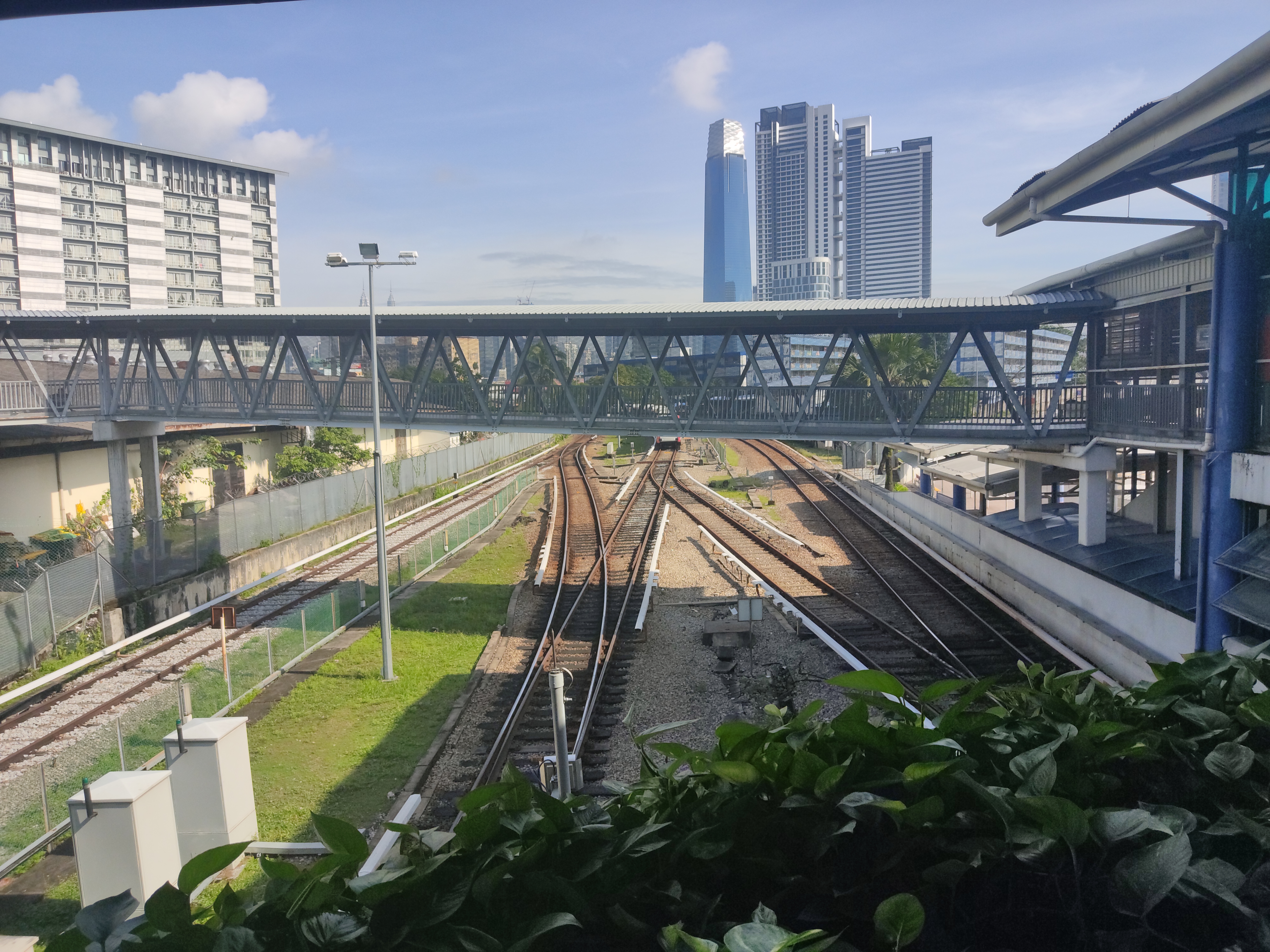
LRT track around Chan Sow Lin, the interchange station between two lines. The Exchange 106 is visible in the background.

The Ampang Line and Sri Petaling Line were originally known as the STAR-LRT (abbreviation for Sistem Transit Aliran Ringan, which translates to Light Rail Transit System), a single train line originating at Sentul Timur station, with two branches to Ampang and Sri Petaling via Chan Sow Lin station.

STAR-LRT was first conceived in the 1981 Transport Master Plan, when the Malaysian government proposed a network of LRT lines connecting Kuala Lumpur city centre with the surrounding areas. An agreement was signed between the government and STAR in 1992.

The original system (27.4 km (17.0 mi)) consists of 25 stations built in two phases. Phase one (12.4 km (7.7 mi)) consists of 14 stations (Ampang – Sultan Ismail) and a depot near Ampang station. Phase two (15 km (9.3 mi)) consists of 11 stations (Chan Sow Lin – Sri Petaling, and Sultan Ismail – Sentul Timur). The two phases opened in December 1996 and July 1998, respectively.

The early phase of Ampang Line used defunct Keretapi Tanah Melayu Ampang branch railway and followed closely with the right-of-way from the old Sultan Street railway station which runs toward Salak.

The initial plan was for STAR to build, own and manage the STAR-LRT. However, STAR ran into financial difficulties and had to be bailed out by the government. So, in 2002, Prasarana took over the line and renamed the STAR-LRT to the STAR line. Operations of the line were subsequently transferred to Rapid KL in 2004 and the line was renamed the LRT Ampang Line and LRT Sri Petaling Line in 2005. The LRT Ampang Line assumed the branch line between Sentul Timur and Ampang stations, whereas LRT Sri Petaling Line assumed the branch line between Sentul Timur and Sri Petaling stations.

=== Extensions ===
In 2006, the government announced the LRT Sri Petaling Line extension project. The extension comprised 11 new stations over 17.7 kilometres (11.0 mi) of elevated track beyond Sri Petaling station. This extended the terminus of the Sri Petaling Line from Sri Petaling to Putra Heights. Unlike the original line, which uses the Fixed-block signalling system, the extension uses the Communications-based train control (CBTC) signalling system. As a result, when the first four stations and the next four stations opened on 31 October 2015 and 31 March 2016, the extension ran as a separate train service between Sri Petaling station and Bandar Puteri station. Re-signalling had to be carried out on the original line before the extension could be combined with the rest of the line. Thales was awarded a contract on 3 September 2012 to upgrade the signalling system on the original line, and the work was completed in July 2016.

== List of stations ==
The LRT Ampang and Sri Petaling Lines run on a common route between Sentul Timur station and Chan Sow Lin station, serving Kuala Lumpur city centre, effectively making all the stations on this section act as interchanges between both lines. The stations have a dedicated platform for trains travelling north to Sentul Timur, and one for trains travelling to Chan Sow Lin, with trains on the respective lines taking turns to stop at the stations at a given time. From the Chan Sow Lin station, the lines diverge and run separately. The LRT Ampang Line travels to its terminus, Ampang station, serving towns in the Cheras and Ampang Jaya areas. The LRT Sri Petaling Line runs to Putra Heights station, where it meets the LRT Kelana Jaya Line, serving southern Kuala Lumpur and Puchong.

Stations on both lines have similar architectural designs and are a mixture of surface and elevated stops. There are no underground stations on either line. Most of the stations have two side platforms, except for four stations that use one single island platform. Chan Sow Lin station has two island platforms, allowing cross-platform interchange between trains from Ampang and Putra Heights, while Putra Heights station has two side platforms and one island platform to facilitate transfers between the LRT Sri Petaling Line and the LRT Kelana Jaya Line.

The stations were initially built without accessibility options for physically challenged passengers. Disabled-friendly facilities for most stations on both lines were installed at the beginning of 2012.

=== LRT Ampang Line ===
Route of Ampang Line

Route of Sri Petaling Line

Station code	Station name	Platform type	Position	Interchange station/Notes	Opening
AG1	Sentul Timur	Terminus (Side)	Elevated	Northern terminus. Start of common route between LRT Ampang Line and LRT Sri Petaling Line.	6 December 1998; 27 years ago
AG2	Sentul	Side	Elevated		6 December 1998; 27 years ago
AG3	Titiwangsa	Side	Elevated	Interchange station with MR11 PY17 KL Monorail and Putrajaya Line. Proposed interchange station with CC09 MRT Circle Line.	6 December 1998; 27 years ago
AG4	PWTC	Side	Elevated	Connecting station to KA04 Putra for KTM Batu Caves-Pulau Sebang Line and KTM Tanjung Malim-Port Klang Line via a 600-metre link bridge.	6 December 1998; 27 years ago
AG5	Sultan Ismail	Side	Elevated	Connecting station to MR9 Medan Tuanku for KL Monorail via a pedestrian link bridge.	16 December 1996; 29 years ago
AG6	Bandaraya–UOB	Side	Elevated	Connecting station to KA03 Bank Negara for KTM Batu Caves-Pulau Sebang Line and KTM Tanjung Malim-Port Klang Line via a 250-metre link bridge.	16 December 1996; 29 years ago
AG7	Masjid Jamek	Side	Elevated	Interchange station with KJ13 Kelana Jaya Line.	16 December 1996; 29 years ago
AG8	Plaza Rakyat	Side	Elevated	Interchange station with KG17 Merdeka on the Kajang Line.	16 December 1996; 29 years ago
AG9	BBCC–Hang Tuah	Side	Surface	Interchange station with MR4 KL Monorail.	16 December 1996; 29 years ago
AG10	Pudu	Side	Elevated		16 December 1996; 29 years ago
AG11	Chan Sow Lin	Island	Surface	Interchange station with PY24 Putrajaya Line. End of common route between LRT Ampang Line and LRT Sri Petaling Line.	16 December 1996; 29 years ago
AG12	Miharja	Side	Surface		16 December 1996; 29 years ago
AG13	Maluri	Side	Elevated	Interchange station with KG22 Kajang Line.	16 December 1996; 29 years ago
AG14	Pandan Jaya	Side	Surface		16 December 1996; 29 years ago
AG15	Pandan Indah	Side	Surface	Proposed interchange with CC20 MRT Circle Line.	16 December 1996; 29 years ago
AG16	Cempaka	Side	Surface		16 December 1996; 29 years ago
AG17	Cahaya	Side	Surface		16 December 1996; 29 years ago
AG18	Ampang	Terminus (Island)	Surface	Eastern terminus.	16 December 1996; 29 years ago

=== LRT Sri Petaling Line ===
Station code	Station name	Platform type	Position	Interchange station/Notes	Opening
SP1	Sentul Timur	Terminus (Side)	Elevated	Northern terminus. Start of common route between LRT Ampang Line and LRT Sri Petaling Line.	6 December 1998; 27 years ago
SP2	Sentul	Side	Elevated		6 December 1998; 27 years ago
SP3	Titiwangsa	Side	Elevated	Interchange station with MR11 PY17 KL Monorail and Putrajaya Line. Proposed interchange station with CC09 MRT Circle Line.	6 December 1998; 27 years ago
SP4	PWTC	Side	Elevated	Connecting station to KA04 Putra for KTM Batu Caves-Pulau Sebang Line and KTM Tanjung Malim-Port Klang Line via a 600-metre link bridge.	6 December 1998; 27 years ago
SP5	Sultan Ismail	Side	Elevated	Connecting station to MR9 Medan Tuanku for KL Monorail via a pedestrian link bridge.	16 December 1996; 29 years ago
SP6	Bandaraya–UOB	Side	Elevated	Connecting station to KA03 Bank Negara for KTM Batu Caves-Pulau Sebang Line and KTM Tanjung Malim-Port Klang Line via a 250-metre link bridge.	16 December 1996; 29 years ago
SP7	Masjid Jamek	Side	Elevated	Interchange station with KJ13 Kelana Jaya Line.	16 December 1996; 29 years ago
SP8	Plaza Rakyat	Side	Elevated	Interchange station with KG17 Merdeka on the Kajang Line.	16 December 1996; 29 years ago
SP9	BBCC–Hang Tuah	Side	Surface	Interchange station with MR4 KL Monorail.	16 December 1996; 29 years ago
SP10	Pudu	Side	Elevated		16 December 1996; 29 years ago
SP11	Chan Sow Lin	Island	Surface	Interchange station with PY24 Putrajaya Line. End of common route between LRT Ampang Line and LRT Sri Petaling Line.	16 December 1996; 29 years ago
SP12	Cheras	Side	Surface	Feeder Bus T401 to KG21 Cochrane for the Kajang Line.	11 July 1998; 28 years ago
SP13	Salak Selatan	Side	Surface	Feeder Bus T402 to KG24 Taman Midah for the Kajang Line. Proposed interchange with CC26 MRT Circle Line.	11 July 1998; 28 years ago
SP14	Bandar Tun Razak	Side	Surface		11 July 1998; 28 years ago
SP15	Bandar Tasik Selatan	Island	Surface	Connecting station with: KB04 KTM Batu Caves-Pulau Sebang Line and KTM ETS; KT2 ERL KLIA Transit; Terminal Bersepadu Selatan (TBS) Bus Hub; Feeder bus T410 to KG26 Taman Connaught for the MRT Kajang Line.	11 July 1998; 28 years ago
SP16	Sungai Besi	Side	Elevated	Interchange station with PY29 Putrajaya Line.	11 July 1998; 28 years ago
SP17	Bukit Jalil	Side	Elevated		11 July 1998; 28 years ago
SP18	Sri Petaling	Side	Surface		11 July 1998; 28 years ago
SP19	Awan Besar	Island	Elevated		31 October 2015; 11 years ago
SP20	Muhibbah	Side	Elevated		31 October 2015; 11 years ago
SP21	Alam Sutera	Side	Elevated		31 October 2015; 11 years ago
SP22	Kinrara BK 5	Side	Elevated		31 October 2015; 11 years ago
SP23	Kinrara BK 3	-	-	Future infill station	-
SP24	IOI Puchong Jaya	Side	Elevated		31 March 2016; 10 years ago
SP25	Pusat Bandar Puchong	Side	Elevated		31 March 2016; 10 years ago
SP26	Taman Perindustrian Puchong	Side	Elevated		31 March 2016; 10 years ago
SP27	Bandar Puteri	Island	Elevated		31 March 2016; 10 years ago
SP28	Puchong Perdana	Side	Elevated		30 June 2016; 10 years ago
SP29	Puchong Prima	Side	Elevated		30 June 2016; 10 years ago
SP30	Kampung Sri Aman	-	-	Future infill station	-
SP31	Putra Heights	Terminus (Island & Side)	Elevated	Southern terminus of both the Kelana Jaya Line and Sri Petaling Line. Cross-platform interchange with KJ37 Kelana Jaya Line.	30 June 2016; 10 years ago

== Rolling stock ==
The LRT Ampang and Sri Petaling Lines system network fleet consists of the following models:

- 50 6-car CSR Zhuzhou articulated LRV trainsets, nicknamed as AMY, operated since January 2015.
- 30 6-car Adtranz-Walkers LRV trainsets, which were operated from December 1996 until December 2016, have been phased out and replaced by CSR Zhuzhou articulated LRV trainsets.

=== First generation Adtranz-Walkers EMU ===
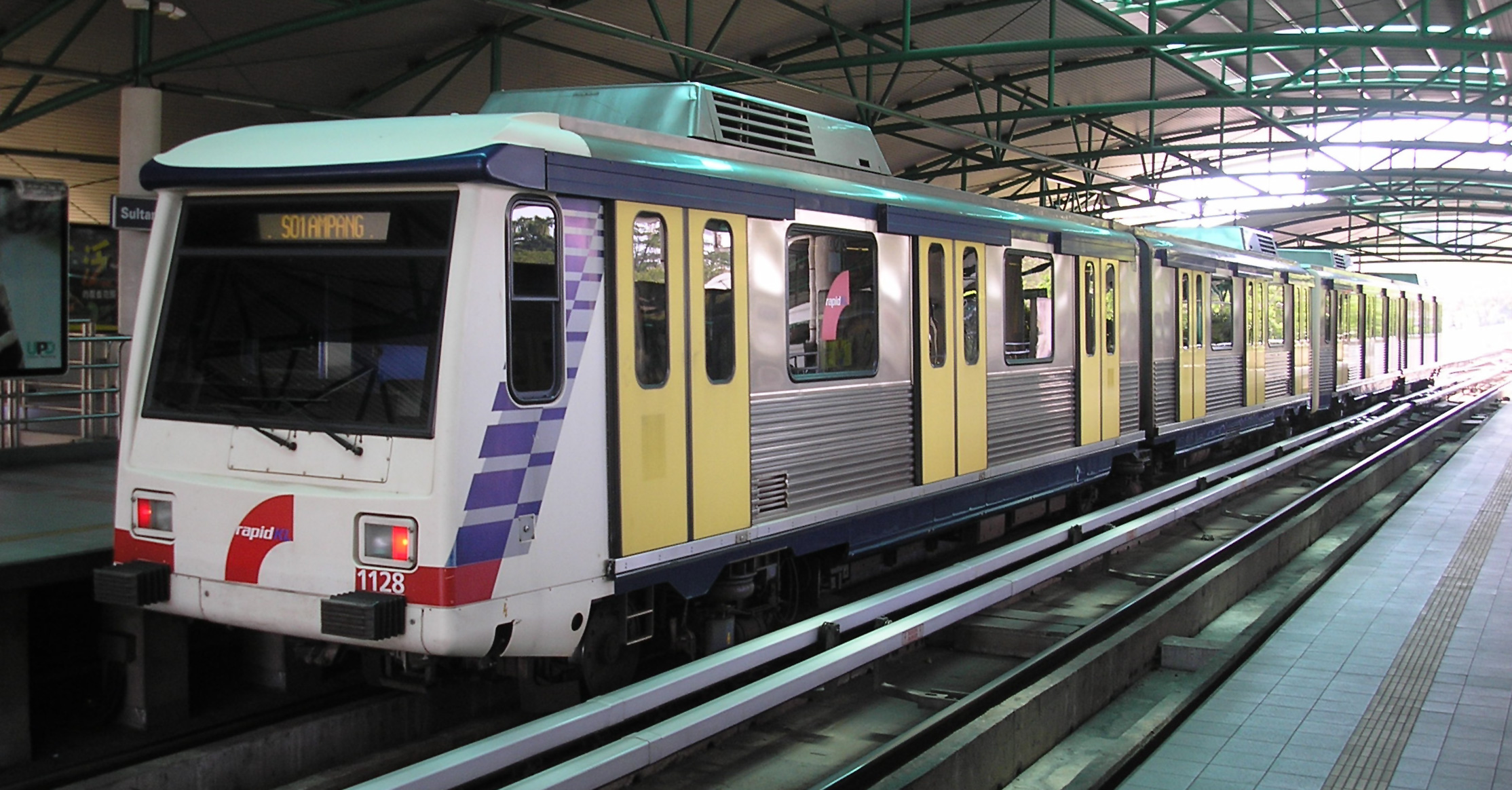
A former first generation stock of Adtranz-Walkers articulated LRV trainset in its initial four-car configuration.

The former fleet consisted of 90 Adtranz standard-gauge light rail vehicle (LRV) manufactured by Walkers Limited of Australia. These trains were electric multiple units (EMU), which draw power from the underside of a third rail alongside the track. All cars in each train were powered. The trains were manned, with driver cabs occupying the ends of the train. The initial four-car configuration, consisting of only two EMU sets (2+2) of one driving car and one trailer car at both ends, were used from the beginning of the operation in 1996. This formation existed until two additional trailer cars were added to the centre, extending the trainsets to six cars consisting of three sets of two EMUs (2+2+2) and utilising the maximum possible platform length of the stations. Each of the two EMU sets at the front and rear consisted of one driving car and one trailer car, while the two EMUs between were trailer cars. Each two EMU sets were not connected to other EMU sets in the train.

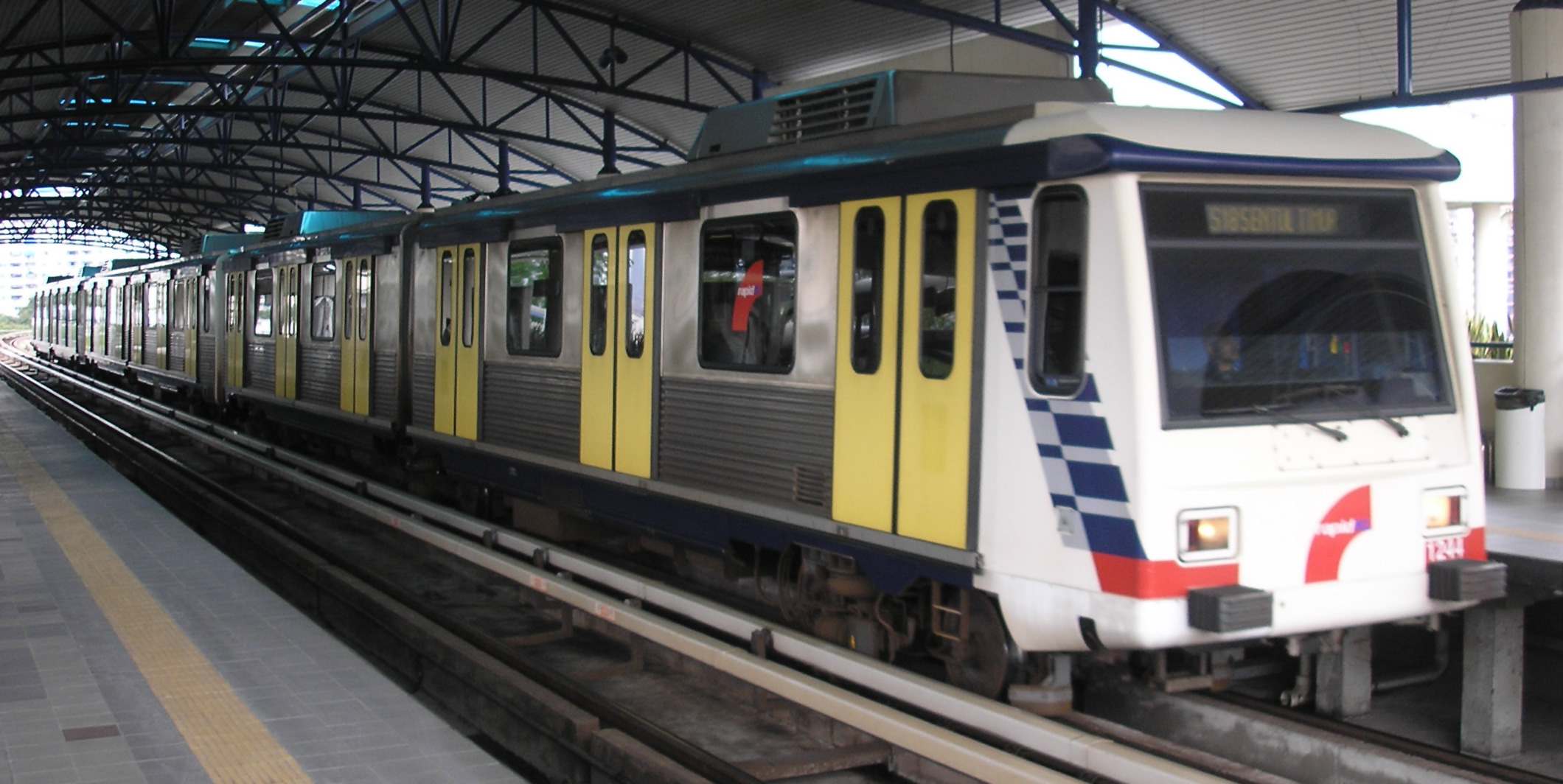
An Adtranz-Walkers LRV in the six-car configuration.

Each car had 3 bogies: 2 power bogies and one articulated trailer for the centre bogie. The end cars, numbered 1101 to 1260, have driver cabs. Middle cars numbered 2201 to 2230 have a concealed driver control panel, enabling the car to be moved around the depot independently.

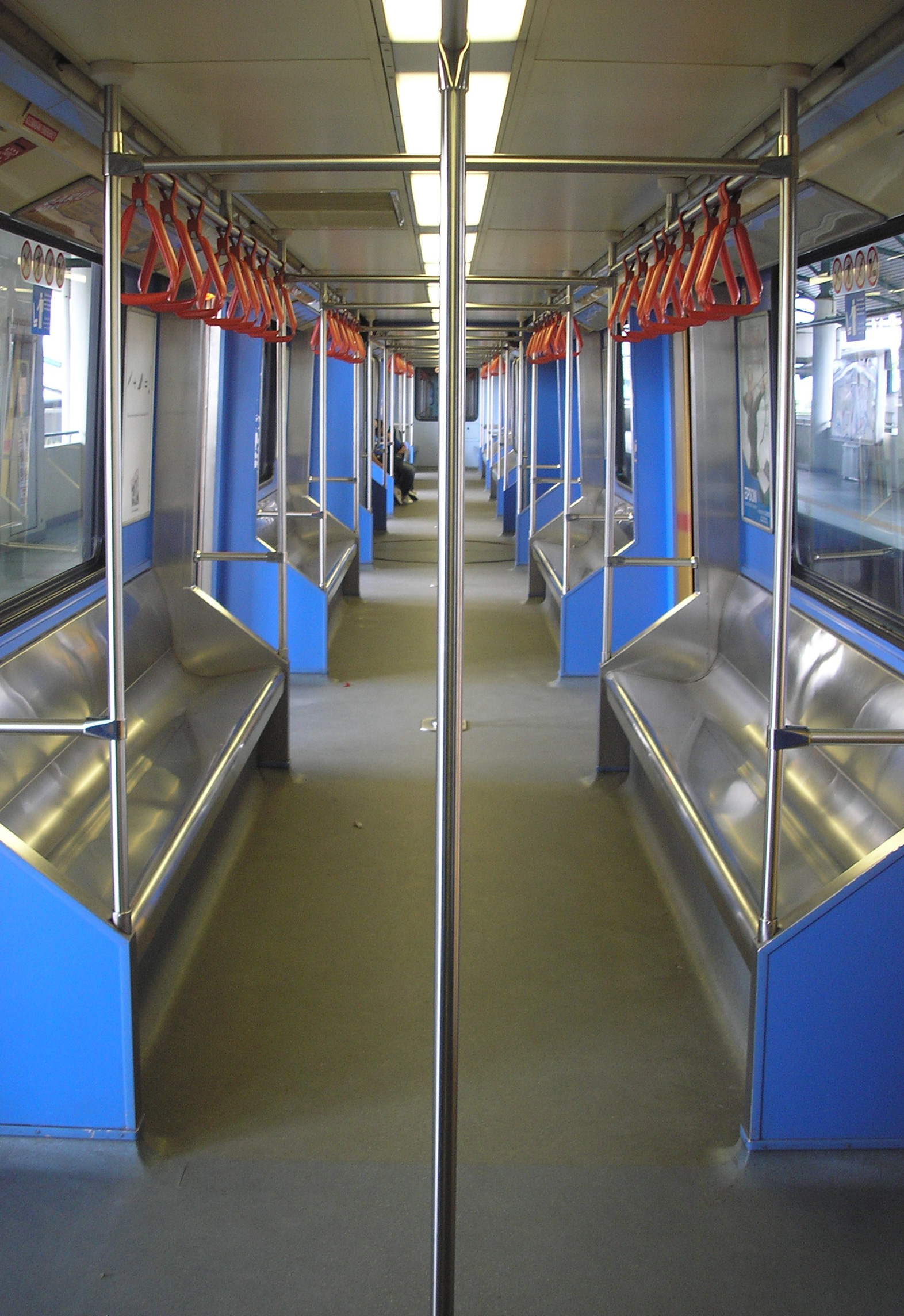
The interior of the first generation Adtranz-Walkers LRV

The train interiors were simple and basic. There were no individual seats, only longitudinal bench seating on either side of the train, surfaced in metal, while spaces near the connecting ends of the cars were provided for passengers who use wheelchairs and other assistive devices, with a large amount of floorspace for standing passengers. The rolling stock, which has remained relatively unchanged since its introduction in 1996, were replaced in stages by the new trains between 2015 and 2016.

=== Second generation CSR-Zhuzhou LRV ===
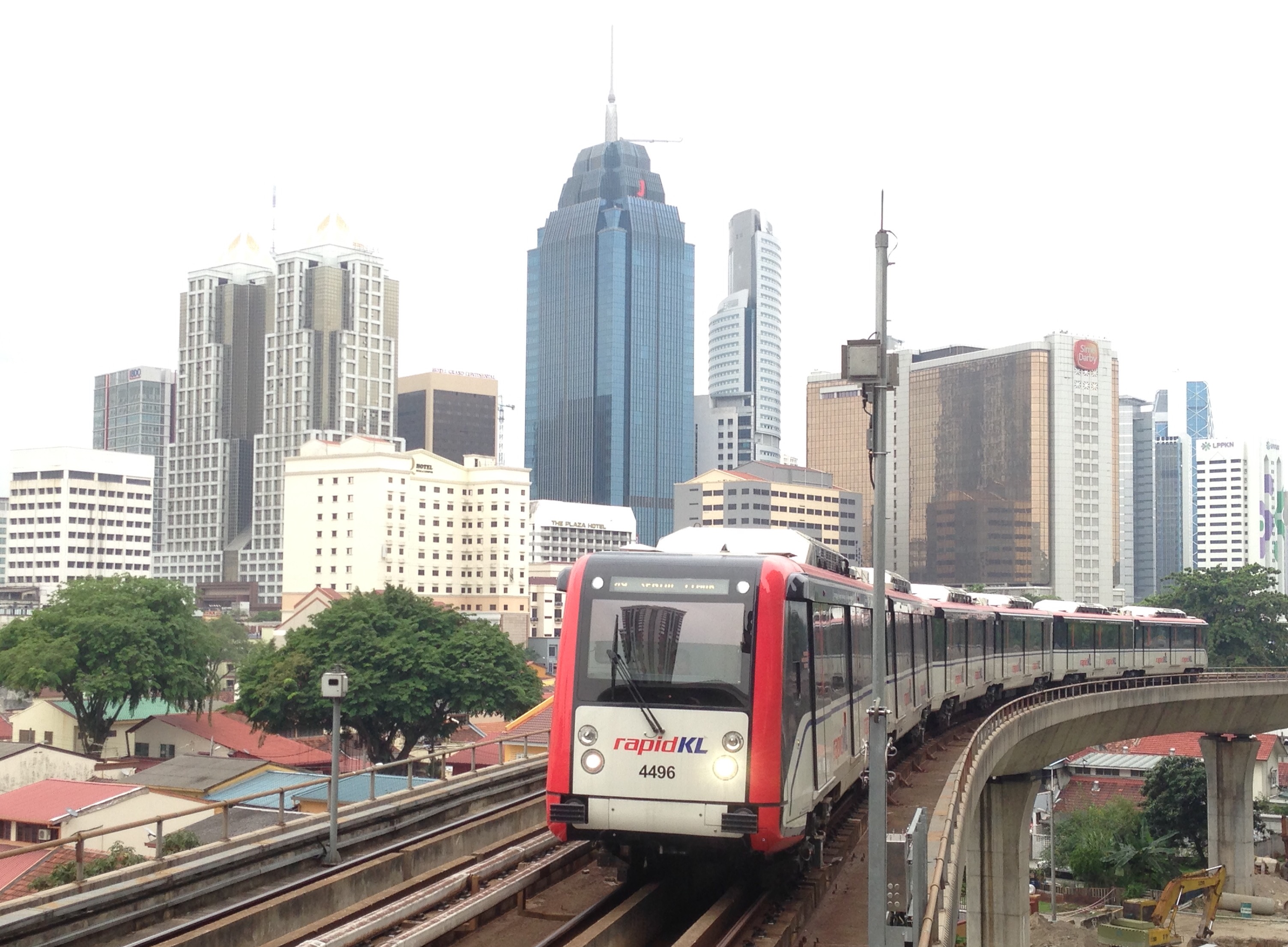
A second generation stock 6-car trainset of CSR Zhuzhou articulated LRV at PWTC

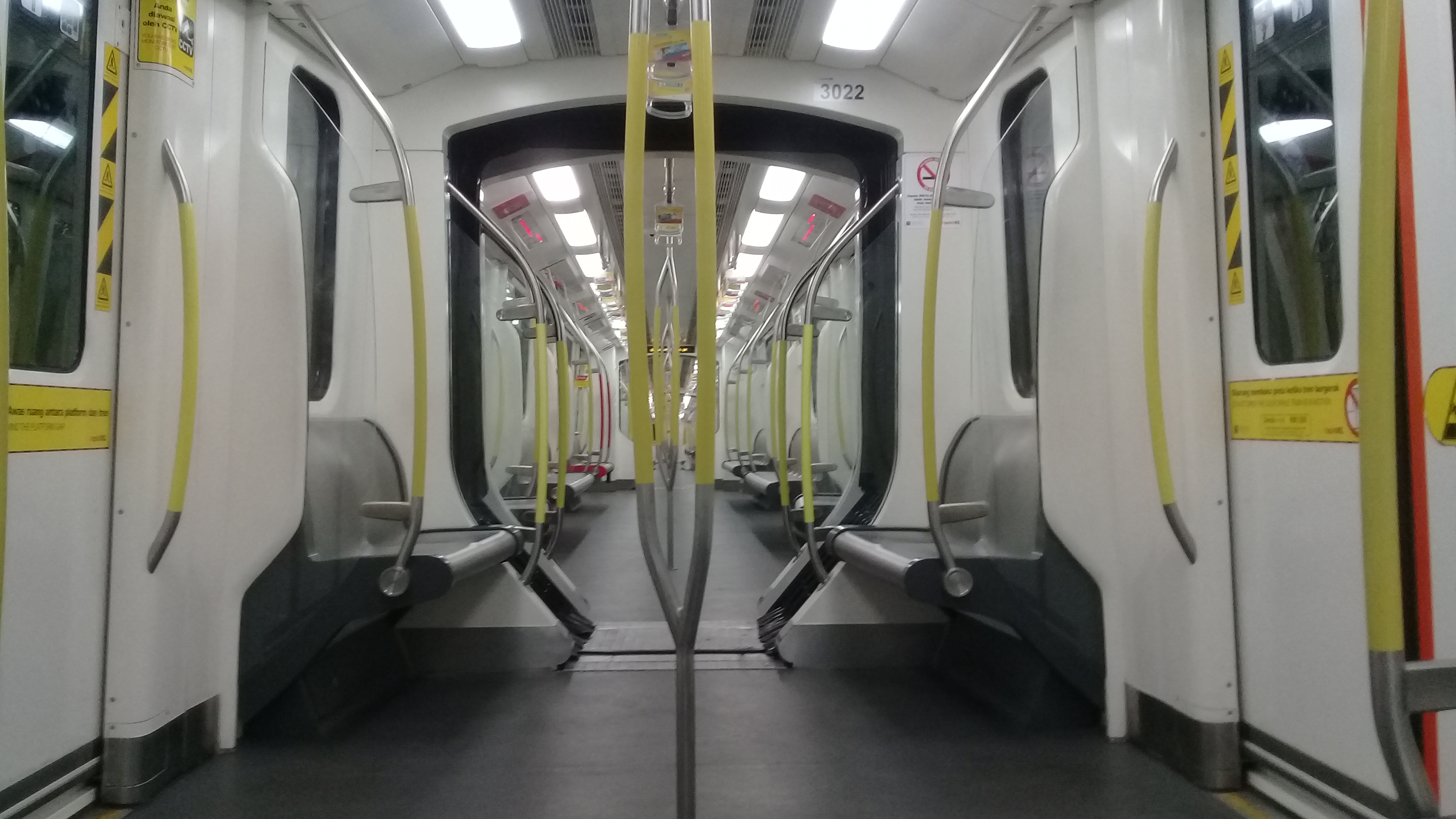
Interior of set AMY 2 in 2019

The second generation rolling stock of the LRT Ampang Line and LRT Sri Petaling Line currently consists of a fleet of 50 new trains, better known as AMY, that are deployed to increase the capacity of the line and provide a better service. Each of the new trains is six cars long and provided by CSR Zhuzhou of China, similar to on the design for İzmir Metro and Buenos Aires Underground 200 Series. These trains are disabled-friendly and include safety features like closed-circuit TV, emergency breakable window, emergency ventilation fan, fire and smoke detection system. The trains are equipped with supervised automatic train operation system (SATO), which claims to be the first railway in Malaysia to introduce such systems. Other elements such as interactive destination display inside the train, non-slipping seats, LCD infotainment, walk-through gangways, and more wheelchair space were included. The first trains were put into service on the Sri Petaling-Kinrara BK 5 stretch in October 2015, and then until Putra Heights and Sentul Timur in July 2016, and finally the Ampang branch line in December 2016.

=== Formation ===
Each train consists of six cars, with numbers 1 to 6 labelled sequentially.

Set designation	1	2	3	4	5	6
Formation	Cabin	Middle Car	Middle Car	Middle Car	Middle Car	Cabin

The car numbers of the trains range from 301x to 450x, where x depends on the carriage type. Individual cars are assigned a four-digit serial number by the rail operator Rapid KL. A complete six-car trainset consists of four trailer (T) and two driving motor (Mc) cars permanently coupled together. For example, set 301 consists of carriages 3011, 3012, 3013, 3014, 3015, and 3016.

- The first digit is always a 3 or 4.
- The second and third digits identify the set number.
- The fourth digit identifies the car number, where the first car has a 1, and the last car has a 6.
- CSR Zhuzhou built sets 301 – 450.

=== Train control ===
The LRT Ampang and Sri Petaling Lines are equipped with the Thales SelTrac Communications-based train control (CBTC) signaling system, and the iVENCS Control Systems.

The operations are controlled at the Ampang Operational and Control Centre, with two depots located at Ampang on the LRT Ampang Line and Kampung Kuala Sungai Baru on the LRT Sri Petaling Line.

== Ridership ==
Ampang/Sri Petaling Line Ridership
Year	Month/Quarter	Ridership	Annual Ridership	Change (%)	Note
2026	Q4	6,303,447	60,921,301		As of October 2026
2026	Q3	18,529,109	60,921,301		
2026	Q2	18,275,105	60,921,301		
2026	Q1	17,813,640	60,921,301		
2025	Q4	18,319,997	71,019,400	▲10.9	Highest on record
2025	Q3	18,358,757	71,019,400	▲10.9	Highest on record
2025	Q2	17,588,114	71,019,400	▲10.9	Highest on record
2025	Q1	16,752,532	71,019,400	▲10.9	Highest on record
2024	Q4	17,417,604	64,022,915	▲26.6	
2024	Q3	16,772,898	64,022,915	▲26.6	
2024	Q2	15,699,049	64,022,915	▲26.6	
2024	Q1	14,133,364	64,022,915	▲26.6	
2023	Q4	13,766,720	50,590,579	▲14.6	
2023	Q3	13,001,834	50,590,579	▲14.6	
2023	Q2	11,577,226	50,590,579	▲14.6	
2023	Q1	12,244,799	50,590,579	▲14.6	
2022	Q4	12,698,812	44,151,332	▲101.2	
2022	Q3	12,846,761	44,151,332	▲101.2	
2022	Q2	10,912,311	44,151,332	▲101.2	
2022	Q1	7,693,448	44,151,332	▲101.2	
2021	Q4	7,133,571	21,938,973	▼ -36.8	Total lockdown
2021	Q3	3,444,161	21,938,973	▼ -36.8	Total lockdown
2021	Q2	5,236,586	21,938,973	▼ -36.8	Total lockdown
2021	Q1	6,124,655	21,938,973	▼ -36.8	Total lockdown
2020	Q4	7,149,692	34,715,565	▼ -46.7	COVID-19 pandemic
2020	Q3	9,973,086	34,715,565	▼ -46.7	COVID-19 pandemic
2020	Q2	3,897,185	34,715,565	▼ -46.7	COVID-19 pandemic
2020	Q1	13,695,602	34,715,565	▼ -46.7	COVID-19 pandemic
2019	Q4	17,258,225	65,147,222	▲6.9	
2019	Q3	16,517,003	65,147,222	▲6.9	
2019	Q2	15,937,182	65,147,222	▲6.9	
2019	Q1	15,434,812	65,147,222	▲6.9	
2018	Q4	15,714,821	60,960,445	▲2.5	
2018	Q3	15,175,894	60,960,445	▲2.5	
2018	Q2	15,116,374	60,960,445	▲2.5	
2018	Q1	14,953,356	60,960,445	▲2.5	
2017	Q4	15,114,180	59,462,032	▲0.5	
2017	Q3	15,693,082	59,462,032	▲0.5	
2017	Q2	14,374,835	59,462,032	▲0.5	
2017	Q1	14,279,935	59,462,032	▲0.5	
2016	Q4	14,896,446	59,192,907	▼ -5.8	
2016	Q3	14,647,600	59,192,907	▼ -5.8	
2016	Q2	15,195,504	59,192,907	▼ -5.8	SP27 Bandar Puteri – SP31 Putra Heights extension opened on 30 June 2016
2016	Q1	14,453,357	59,192,907	▼ -5.8	SP22 Kinrara BK 5 – SP27 Bandar Puteri extension opened on 31 March 2016
2015	Q4	15,621,221	62,809,412	▼ -0.7	SP18 Sri Petaling – SP22 Kinrara BK 5 extension opened on 31 October 2015
2015	Q3	15,998,017	62,809,412	▼ -0.7	
2015	Q2	15,989,856	62,809,412	▼ -0.7	
2015	Q1	15,200,318	62,809,412	▼ -0.7	
2014	Q4	15,865,858	63,270,432	▲5.1	
2014	Q3	15,848,265	63,270,432	▲5.1	
2014	Q2	16,184,441	63,270,432	▲5.1	
2014	Q1	15,371,868	63,270,432	▲5.1	
2013	Q4	15,014,017	60,207,397	▲6.0	
2013	Q3	15,645,919	60,207,397	▲6.0	
2013	Q2	14,840,394	60,207,397	▲6.0	
2013	Q1	14,707,067	60,207,397	▲6.0	
2012	Q4	14,375,425	56,809,978	▲6.1	
2012	Q3	14,930,837	56,809,978	▲6.1	
2012	Q2	14,031,346	56,809,978	▲6.1	
2012	Q1	13,472,370	56,809,978	▲6.1	
2011	Q4	13,115,583	53,568,672	▲3.9	
2011	Q3	13,911,334	53,568,672	▲3.9	
2011	Q2	13,583,379	53,568,672	▲3.9	
2011	Q1	12,958,376	53,568,672	▲3.9	
2010	Q4	12,538,027	51,100,433	▲4.4	
2010	Q3	13,773,524	51,100,433	▲4.4	
2010	Q2	12,555,684	51,100,433	▲4.4	
2010	Q1	12,233,198	51,100,433	▲4.4	
2009	Q4	12,538,026	49,393,485	▼ -3.2	
2009	Q3	12,708,169	49,393,485	▼ -3.2	
2009	Q2	12,241,907	49,393,485	▼ -3.2	
2009	Q1	11,905,383	49,393,485	▼ -3.2	
2008	Q4	12,100,185	51,009,480	▼ -2.7	
2008	Q3	13,873,309	51,009,480	▼ -2.7	
2008	Q2	12,749,118	51,009,480	▼ -2.7	
2008	Q1	12,286,868	51,009,480	▼ -2.7	
2007	Q4		52,434,883	▲5.4	
2007	Q3		52,434,883	▲5.4	
2007	Q2		52,434,883	▲5.4	
2007	Q1		52,434,883	▲5.4	
2006	Q4		49,727,909	▲9.0	
2006	Q3		49,727,909	▲9.0	
2006	Q2		49,727,909	▲9.0	
2006	Q1		49,727,909	▲9.0	
2005	Q4		45,636,997	▲4.8	
2005	Q3		45,636,997	▲4.8	
2005	Q2		45,636,997	▲4.8	
2005	Q1		45,636,997	▲4.8	
2004	Q4		43,535,471	▲5.8	
2004	Q3		43,535,471	▲5.8	
2004	Q2		43,535,471	▲5.8	
2004	Q1		43,535,471	▲5.8	
2003	Q4		41,159,817	▲23.0	
2003	Q3		41,159,817	▲23.0	
2003	Q2		41,159,817	▲23.0	
2003	Q1		41,159,817	▲23.0	
2002	Q4		33,471,344	▲3.3	
2002	Q3		33,471,344	▲3.3	
2002	Q2		33,471,344	▲3.3	
2002	Q1		33,471,344	▲3.3	
2001	Q4		32,412,191	▲14.0	
2001	Q3		32,412,191	▲14.0	
2001	Q2		32,412,191	▲14.0	
2001	Q1		32,412,191	▲14.0	
2000	Q4		28,426,201	▲24.5	
2000	Q3		28,426,201	▲24.5	
2000	Q2		28,426,201	▲24.5	
2000	Q1		28,426,201	▲24.5	
1999	Q4		22,829,543	-	
1999	Q3		22,829,543	-	
1999	Q2		22,829,543	-	
1999	Q1		22,829,543	-	

== Accidents and incidents ==
There were four major incidents that happened since services started operations in 1996.

=== Sentul Timur buffer overshoot ===
On 27 October 2006; 20 years ago at 7:11am, a six-coach Adtranz LRT train which came in from Ampang overshot the end of the elevated tracks at the end of the stabling tracks at Sentul Timur station, resulting in the front half of the set 1113 dangling in the air about 25 m above the ground. A lone driver was the only one on board when the incident took place. Only Sentul Timur station endured service disruption for 20 minutes that day.

=== Bukit Jalil train collision ===
On 24 September 2008; 18 years ago at 6:30pm, two LRT trains collided about 200m from Bukit Jalil station. A carriage of one of the trains involved in the accident hit the rear of the other train, resulting the suspension of the operation on that day. Six passengers were injured in this accident.

=== Kinked tracks between Bandaraya and Masjid Jamek stations ===
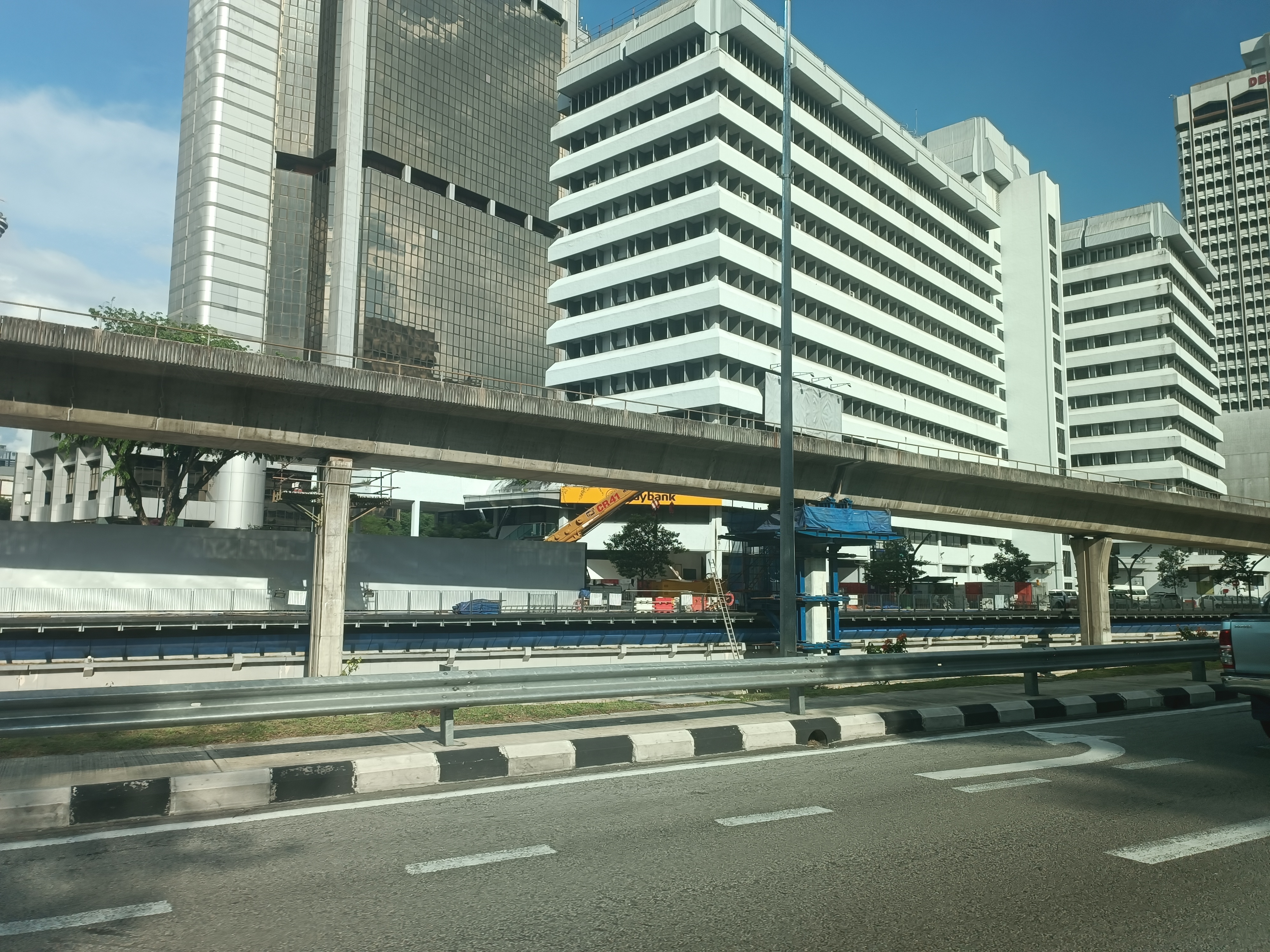
Kinked track under maintenance near Bandaraya LRT Station

Masjid Jamek LRT Station is the starting point of the LRT replacement bus

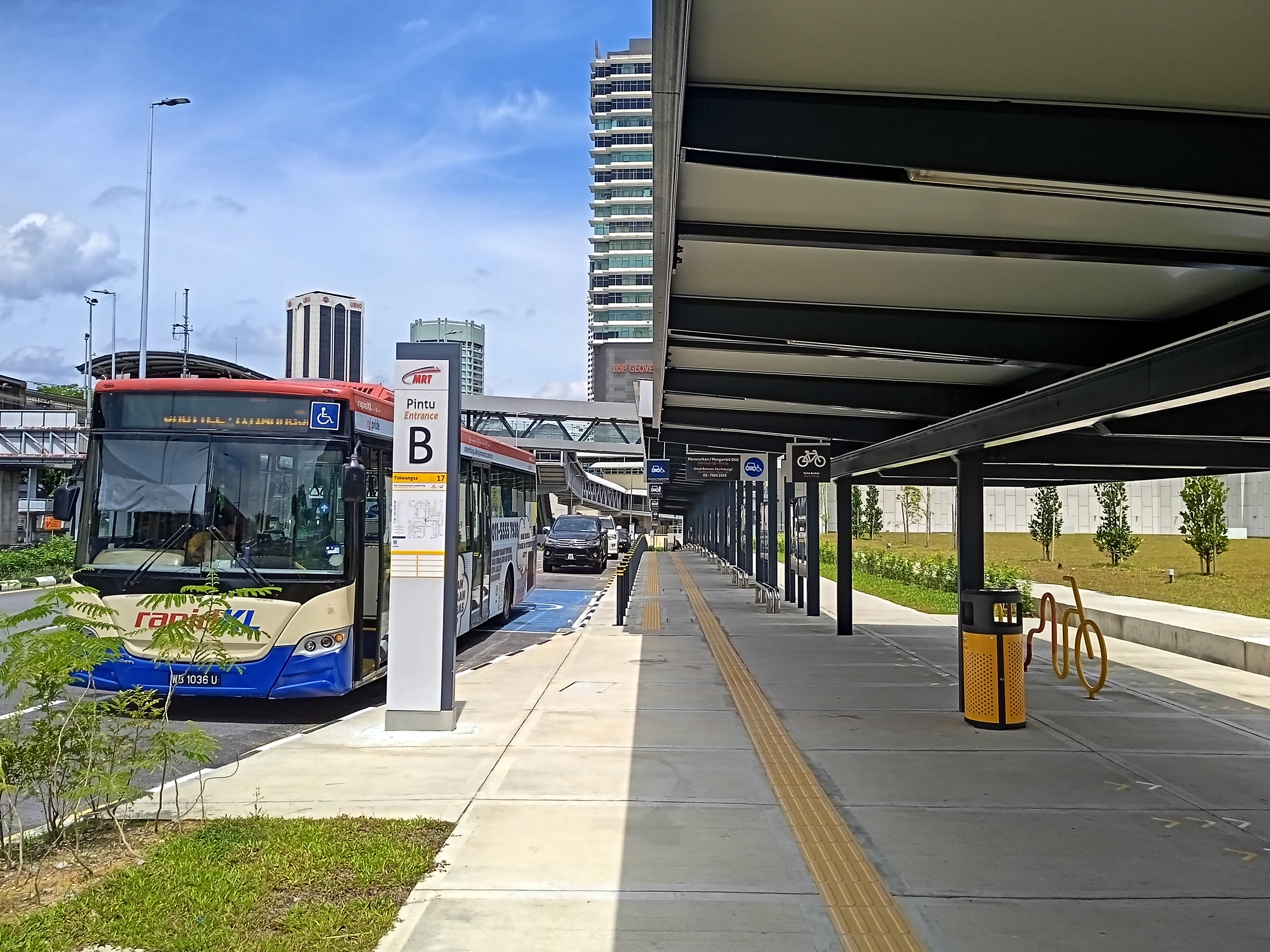
Replacement bus service at Titiwangsa Station

On 27 January 2023, a kinked track as well as a cracked viaduct and pier were found near Bandaraya LRT station, and the route between Bandaraya and Masjid Jamek LRT station was temporarily closed for safety reasons. Free shuttle buses were provided in the affected stations. Investigations found out that it was caused by the construction of a 44-storey hotel nearby. It was expected to take up to seven months to repair. However, the repair works were extended after several other damages were detected in two other nearby viaducts.

Six stations from Sentul Timur to Bandaraya were closed from 2 April 2023, as the trains used no longer met the operational criteria, and were unable to return to the depot at Ampang for maintenance, therefore the affected route could not be operated for safety reasons. Six stations resumed operations from 12 May 2023, while tracks between Bandaraya and Masjid Jamek stations remain closed.

Revised service are as follows:

27 January 2023 — 2 April 2023

- Trains from Ampang and Putra Heights will terminate at Hang Tuah.
- Shuttle train between Hang Tuah and Masjid Jamek.
- Trains from Sentul Timur will terminate at Bandaraya, with 24 minute frequency.
- Replacement bus between Hang Tuah and Bandaraya, stopping at every station (LRT9)
- Replacement bus between Masjid Jamek and Bandaraya, stopping at every station (LRT10)
- Replacement bus between Sentul Timur and Bandaraya, stopping at every station except Sultan Ismail (LRT11)

2 April 2023 — 12 May 2023

- Trains from Ampang and Putra Heights will terminate at Hang Tuah.
- No train service between Sentul Timur and Masjid Jamek.
- Shuttle train between Hang Tuah and Masjid Jamek.
- Replacement bus between Sentul Timur and Masjid Jamek, stopping at every station except Sultan Ismail (LRT11)
- Replacement bus between Masjid Jamek, Sentul and Sentul Timur, express bus without stopping at station in between (LRT 13)
- Replacement bus between Masjid Jamek and Titiwangsa, express bus without stopping at station in between (LRT 14)

12 May 2023 — 31 January 2024

- Trains from Ampang and Putra Heights will terminate at Hang Tuah.
- Shuttle train between Hang Tuah and Masjid Jamek.
- Trains from Sentul Timur will terminate at Bandaraya, with 6 minute frequency for peak hour or 8 minutes frequency for non-peak hour.
- Replacement bus between Masjid Jamek and Bandaraya, stopping at every station (LRT10)

1 February 2024 — 16 February 2024

- Trains from Ampang and Putra Heights will terminate at Masjid Jamek.
- Trains from Sentul Timur will terminate at Bandaraya.
- Replacement bus between Masjid Jamek and Bandaraya, stopping at every station (LRT10)

=== Chan Sow Lin derailment ===
On the morning of 28 May 2026, a train near Chan Sow Lin station heading towards Putra Heights experienced a derailment due to a faulty track switch. All 25 passengers on board were safely evacuated.

The derailed train is expected to be fully removed by 29 May 2026 to allow repairs to commence. The repair works are expected to be completed by 3 June 2026. Preliminary investigations determined that the cause of the derailment was due to a switch box malfunction. This resulted in only the first carriage of the train travelling on the correct track while the remaining carriages being directed to the other track. Subsequently, the force from this caused the first carriage to be pulled off the track, resulting in the derailment of the first two carriages.

On 2 June 2026, Rapid KL announced that the majority of the repair works have been completed and the Sri Petaling Line (Sentul Timur-Putra Heights) will return to regular operations without any interchanges needed. However, from 3rd June 2026 onwards, the Ampang Line will operate under a temporary operating mode where trains from Ampang will terminate at Chan Sow Lin before turning back to Ampang. Commuters from the Ampang branch heading towards Sentul Timur or vice versa are required to switch trains at Chan Sow Lin station. Rapid KL also stated that comprehensive repair and monitoring works continue and free shuttle bus services are also provided.
