= Taman Perindustrian Puchong LRT station =

Transit station in Puchong, Malaysia

Coordinates: 3°1′22.3″N 101°36′48.6″E

SP26 Taman Perindustrian Puchong
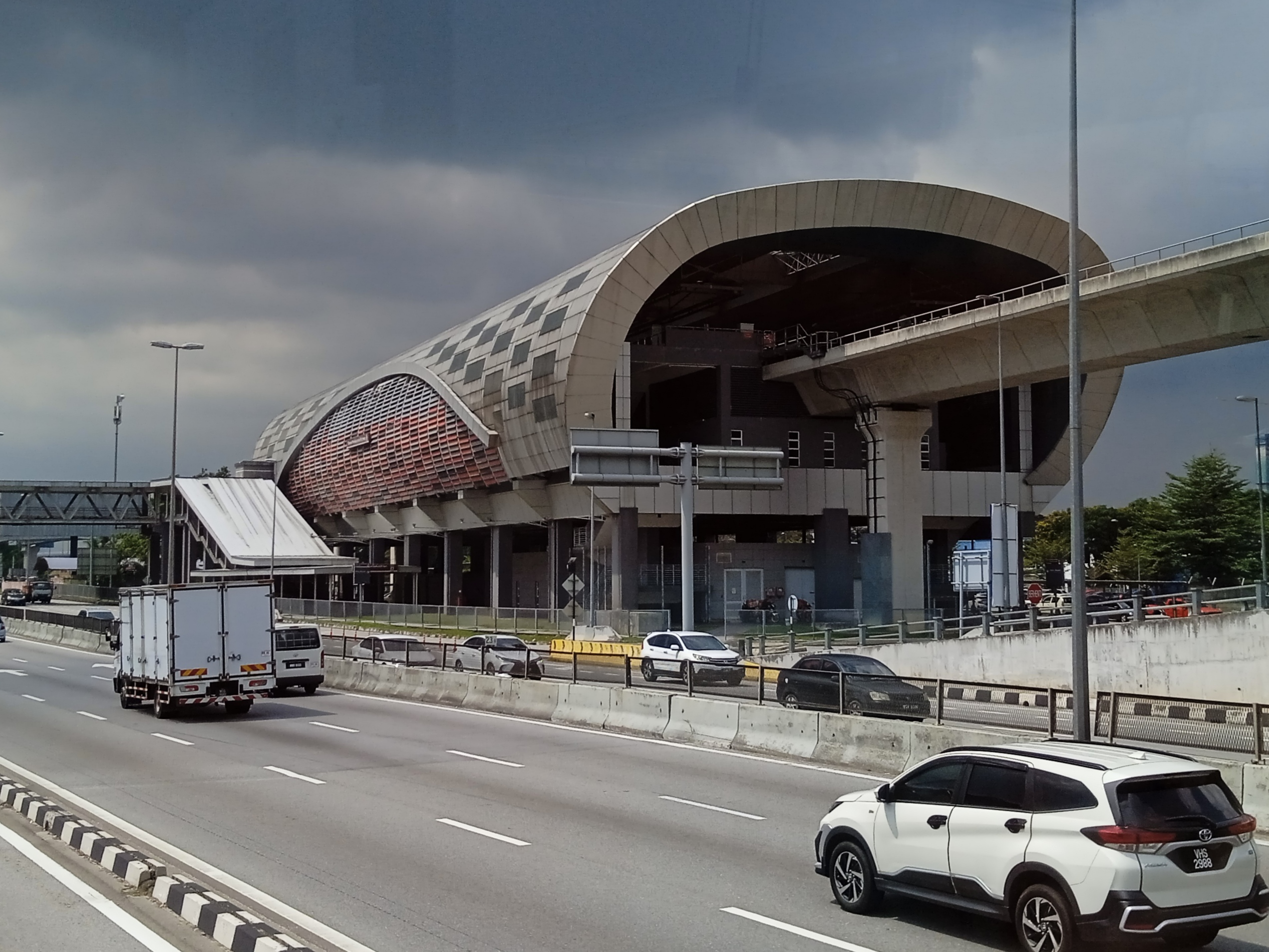

General information
- Other names: Malay: تامن ڤرايندوسترين ڤوچوڠ (Jawi); Chinese: 蒲种工业园; Tamil: பூச்சோங் தொழில் பூங்கா
- Location: Jalan TPP 1/7, Taman Perindustrian Puchong; 47100 Puchong; Selangor; Malaysia
- System: Rapid KL
- Owner: Prasarana Malaysia
- Operator: Rapid Rail
- Line: 4 Sri Petaling Line
- Platforms: 2 side platforms
- Tracks: 2

Construction
- Structure type: Elevated
- Parking: Available with payment. 347 total parking bays.
- Cycle facilities: Available, 20 bicycle racks.

Other information
- Station code: SP26

History
- Opened: 31 March 2016; 10 years ago

Services
Preceding station		Following station
Pusat Bandar Puchong towards Sentul Timur	Sri Petaling Line	Bandar Puteri towards Putra Heights
Location

Taman Perindustrian Puchong LRT station is a Malaysian light rapid transit (LRT) station serving the Puchong Industrial Park, Puchong, Selangor. It is part of the LRT Sri Petaling Line. Like most other LRT stations operating in the Klang Valley, this station is elevated.

The station is situated beside the Rakan Muda Complex, with the 1Malaysia for Youth (1M4U) centre situated in it. A pedestrian bridge over the Damansara–Puchong Expressway connects the station to the shopping district of Bandar Puteri Puchong.

This station probably holds the distinction for having the longest station name within the Rapid KL network, having 25 characters in its name.

== History ==
Station platform

The extension of the Sri Petaling Line was announced on 29 August 2006 by then Deputy Prime Minister of Malaysia Najib Razak. Then Prime Minister of Malaysia Abdullah Ahmad Badawi also confirmed that the government was considering and researching the possibilities of the extension in his National Budget speech in 2006. The station was originally planned to be built near the Puchong Fire and Rescue Station on the east side of the Damansara–Puchong Expressway, however the current site was approved by the Subang Jaya City Council (MBSJ) in 2009.

The extension project, worth RM955.84 million, was awarded to a joint venture (JV) consortium of George Kent (M) Bhd and its partner Lion Pacific Sdn Bhd. Construction started in 2010. However, construction was halted when SJK (T) Castlefield, a tamil school which was in the way of the project, refused to be reallocated to a proposed site. The proposed site had caused disputes when another school, SJK (C) Kheng Cheng, was also planned to be built on the same site. After some negotiation and interference of local Members of Parliament, the school remained at its original site with the elevated railway using just 0.7 acres of school grounds.

Fault-free test runs of the trains started on 22 January 2016. Although it faced some delays, the station was opened on 31 March 2016, as part of Phase 2 of the extension project.

== Station ==
=== Station Layout ===
Park-and-ride facilities are provided at the station with 347 parking bays. Two convenience stores, operated by Mynews.com and 7-Eleven, can be found in the station. Like all LRT station in Klang Valley, the station provides disabled-friendly facilities such as accessibility lifts, accessible toilets, special gate entrance for wheelchair users and tactile paving provided throughout the station. The trains and station platforms are level with one another, with a minimal gap between the two, allowing for easy boarding with a wheelchair.

P	Side platform, doors will open on the left
P	Platform 2:	4 Sri Petaling Line towards SP31 Putra Heights (→)
P	Platform 1:	4 Sri Petaling Line towards AG1 SP1 Sentul Timur (←)
P	Side platform, doors will open on the left
C	Concourse level	Ticket vending machine, faregates, convenience store, customer service office, pedestrian bridge
G	Street level	Park N' Ride, bus stop, bus information kiosk, convenience store
refers to accessibility lift for disabled.

=== Infrastructure ===
As part of a green initiative launched by Prasarana, the station includes green practices. Energy-efficient lights and rainwater harvesting systems were installed in every station. Windows were designed to allow sunlight into the stations. Construction utilized sustainable materials and recycling practices.

=== Entrances and Exits ===
Taman Perindustrian Puchong LRT station has a total of two entrances/exits, one heading towards the industrial area and the Park N' Ride facilities, while another leads to the shopping district of Bandar Puteri.

Sri Petaling Line station
Entrance	Location	Destination	Picture
A	Jalan TPP 1/7	Taman Perindustrian Puchong	
B	Jalan Puteri 4/2	Jalan Puteri shop lots	

== Bus services ==
=== Feeder bus ===
Route No.	Origin	Destination	Via
T604	SP26 Taman Perindustrian Puchong	SP25 Pusat Bandar Puchong	Jalan Sri Puchong 1 Jalan Bandar 7 Damansara–Puchong Expressway; Jalan Bandar Puchong Jaya; Jalan Puchong–Petaling Jaya

=== Other buses ===
Route No.	Origin	Destination	Via
506	KT3 PY41 Putrajaya Sentral	Bandar Utama	Central Park Avenue; Jalan Burhanuddin al-Helmi; Damansara–Puchong Expressway; Persiaran Bandar Utama; Dataran Bandar Utama
600	Puchong Utama	KJ14 KG16 Pasar Seni	Jalan Tun Sambanthan; Jalan Klang Lama; Jalan Puchong; Damansara–Puchong Expressway
601	KJ14 KG16 Pasar Seni	Putra Perdana	Jalan Tun Sambanthan; Jalan Klang Lama; Lebuh Puteri; Jalan Puchong–Petaling Jaya; Damansara–Puchong Expressway; Bulatan Putra Perdana
604	KJ14 KG16 Pasar Seni	Saujana Puchong	Jalan Tun Sambanthan; Jalan Klang Lama; Lebuh Puteri; Jalan Puchong–Petaling Jaya; Damansara–Puchong Expressway; Persiaran Saujana Puchong; Jalan Bukit Puchong

== Gallery ==
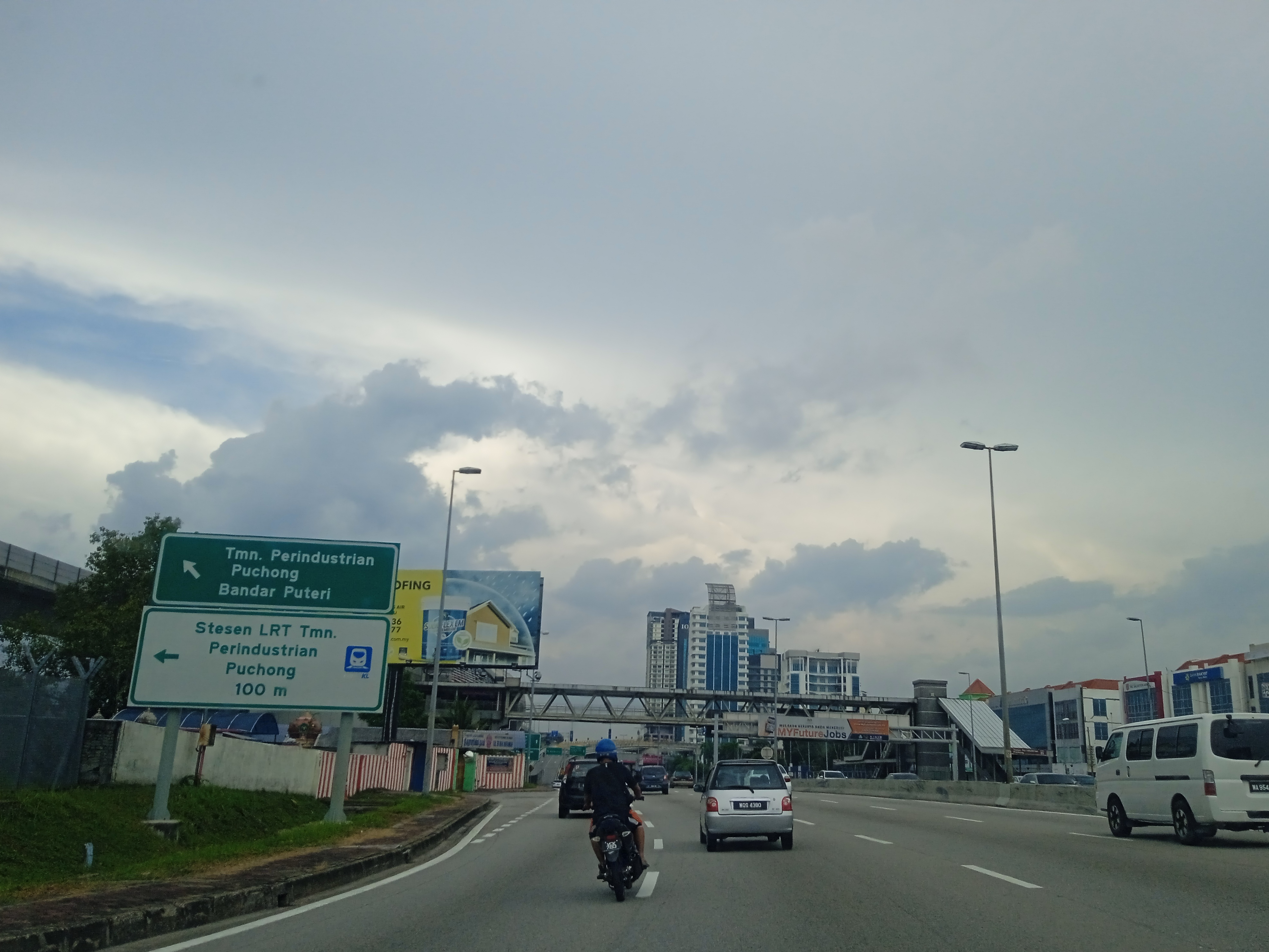
Highway signboard on the Damansara-Puchong Expressway (LDP) indicating the direction of the station

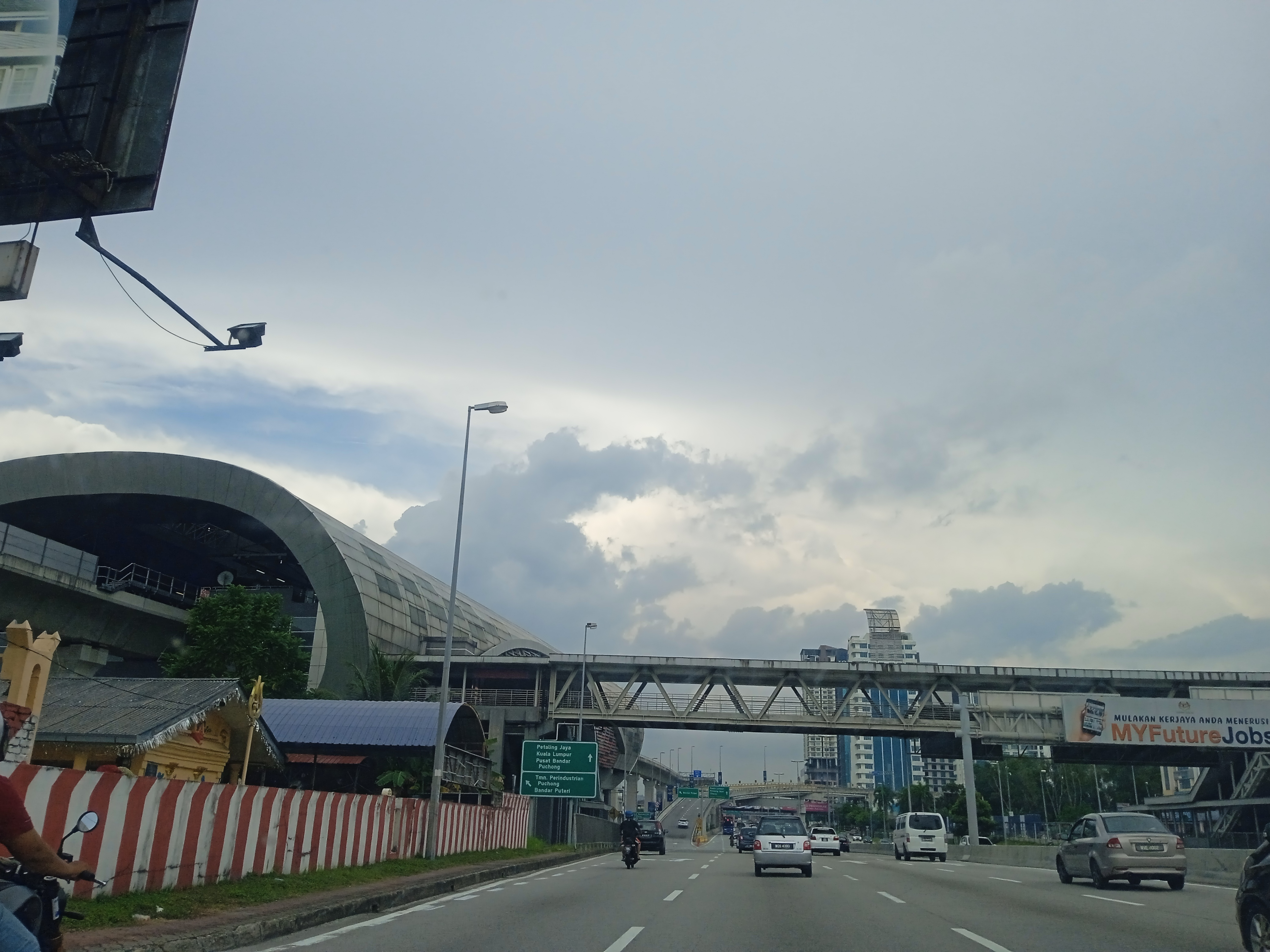
View of the station from the northbound carriageway of the LDP

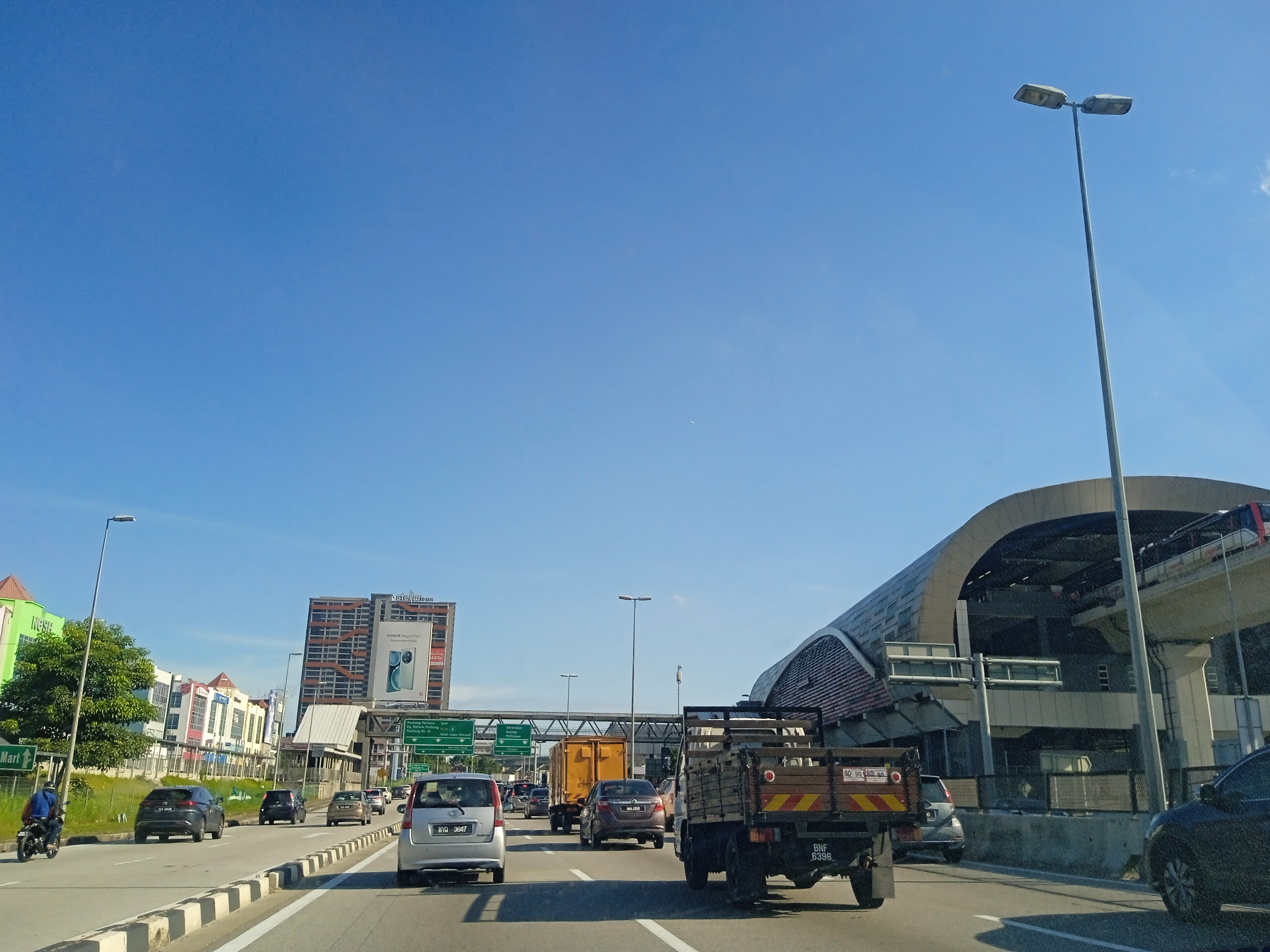
View of the station from the southbound carriageway of the LDP
