= Sentul station =

Sentul station may refer to:

- Sentul Komuter station, part of the Batu Caves-Pulau Sebang Line in Sentul, Kuala Lumpur
- Sentul LRT station, part of the LRT Ampang Line and LRT Sri Petaling Line in Sentul, Kuala Lumpur
