= Bandaraya LRT station =

Railway station in Kuala Lumpur, Malaysia

AG6 SP6 Bandaraya – UOB
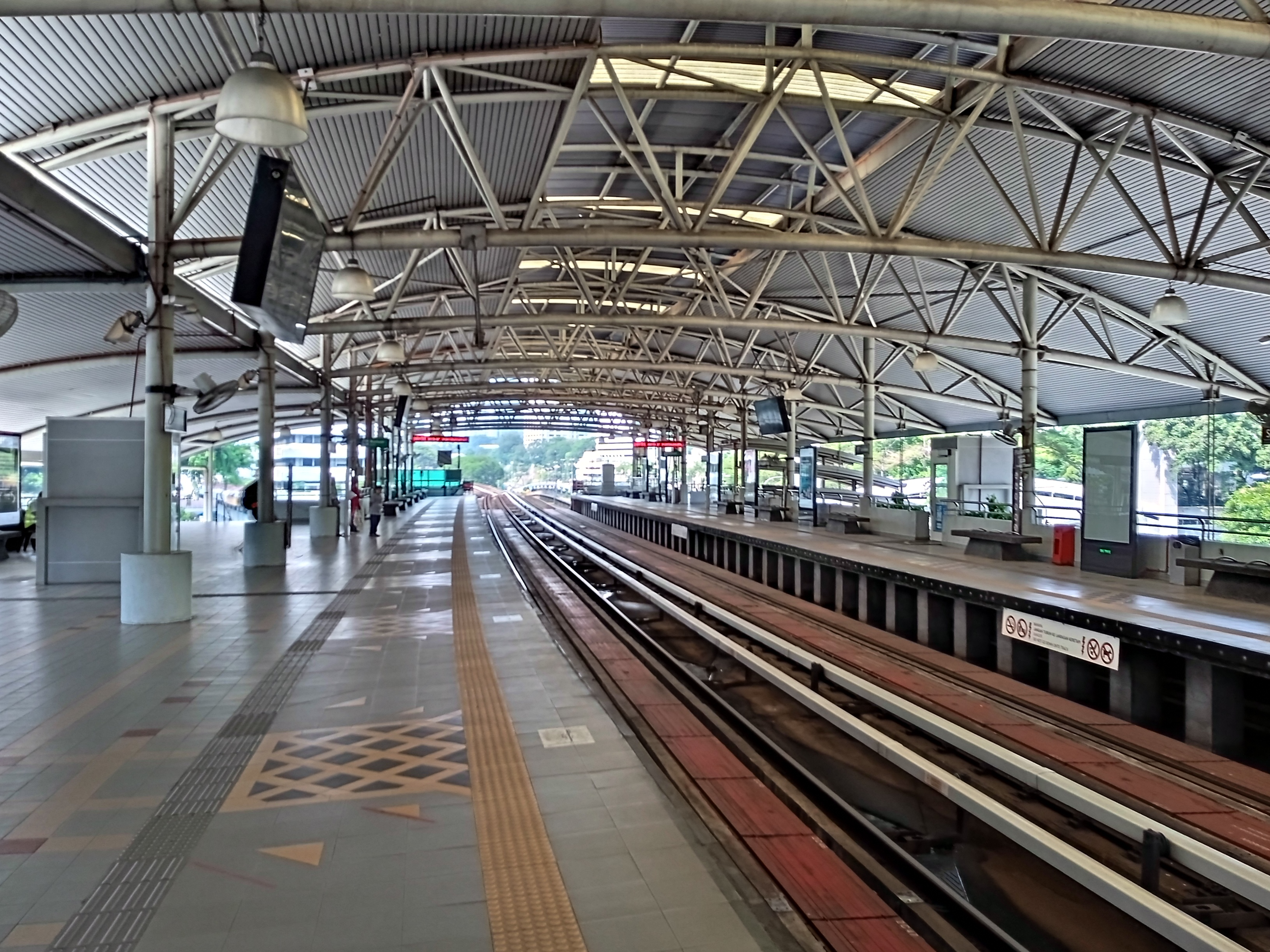
- Platform view of the station at daytime

General information
- Other names: Malay: باندرراي (Jawi); Chinese: 市政局; Tamil: பண்டாராயா
- Location: Jalan Raja Laut; 50350 Kuala Lumpur; Malaysia
- Coordinates: 3°9′20″N 101°41′39″E
- System: Rapid KL
- Owner: Prasarana Malaysia
- Operator: Rapid Rail
- Lines: 3 Ampang Line; 4 Sri Petaling Line
- Platforms: 2 side platforms
- Tracks: 2
- Connections: Connecting station to KA03 Bank Negara via a 140 meters pedestrian walkway

Construction
- Structure type: Elevated
- Platform levels: 2
- Parking: Not available
- Cycle facilities: Not available
- Accessible: Available

Other information
- Station code: AG6 SP6

History
- Opened: 16 December 1996; 29 years ago

Services
Preceding station		Following station
Sultan Ismail towards Sentul Timur	Ampang Line	Masjid Jamek towards Ampang
Sultan Ismail towards Sentul Timur	Sri Petaling Line	Masjid Jamek towards Putra Heights
Location

Bandaraya LRT station, also known as Bandaraya–UOB LRT station under the station naming rights programme, is an elevated light rapid transit (LRT) station in central Kuala Lumpur, Malaysia. The station is on the common route shared by the LRT Ampang Line and LRT Sri Petaling Line. The station opened on 16 December 1996, as part of the first phase of the former STAR LRT system's opening, along with 13 adjoining stations along the Sultan Ismail to Ampang route.

== Description ==
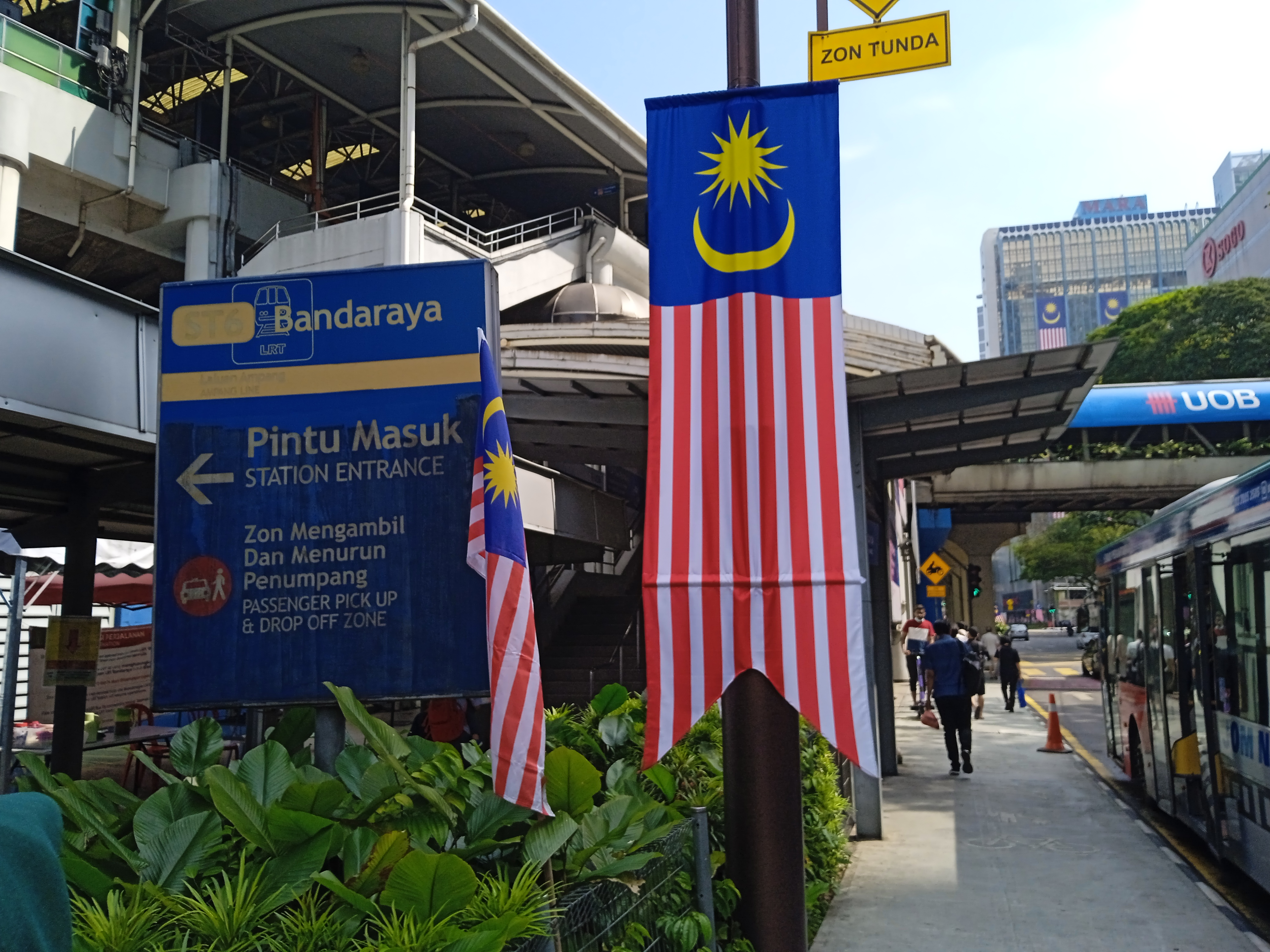
The entrance of the station

The station stands between the eastern banks of the Gombak River and an intersection between Jalan Raja Laut, a major thoroughfare along the Gombak River, and Jalan Isfahan. The station is the southernmost LRT station along the Gombak River. The station is also within close proximity of several shopping complexes, such as the present Kuala Lumpur City Hall (DBKL) headquarters of which the station is named after, and the Bank Negara Malaysia headquarters.

The station is some 140 m from the Bank Negara Komuter station, a KTM Komuter station served by the Batu Caves–Pulau Sebang Line and Tanjung Malim–Port Klang Line, to which it is linked by a footbridge. The two stations are designated as official connecting stations on official transit maps. It was the first rail transit station in Kuala Lumpur to have a connection with another railway system and, prior to the opening of the LRT Kelana Jaya Line and remaining phases of the STAR lines, the only station of this kind, although there was no network or paid-area integration between the two stations. Bandaraya is also close to bus stops along Jalan Raja Laut, Jalan Dang Wangi and Jalan Tuanku Abdul Rahman.

== Around the station ==
- SOGO KL
- Pertama Complex
- CapSquare Centre
- City One Plaza
- Jalan Tuanku Abdul Rahman
- CIMB Bank
- United Overseas Bank
- Coliseum Theatre
- Kuala Lumpur City Hall (DBKL) headquarters – the namesake of the station

== Gallery ==
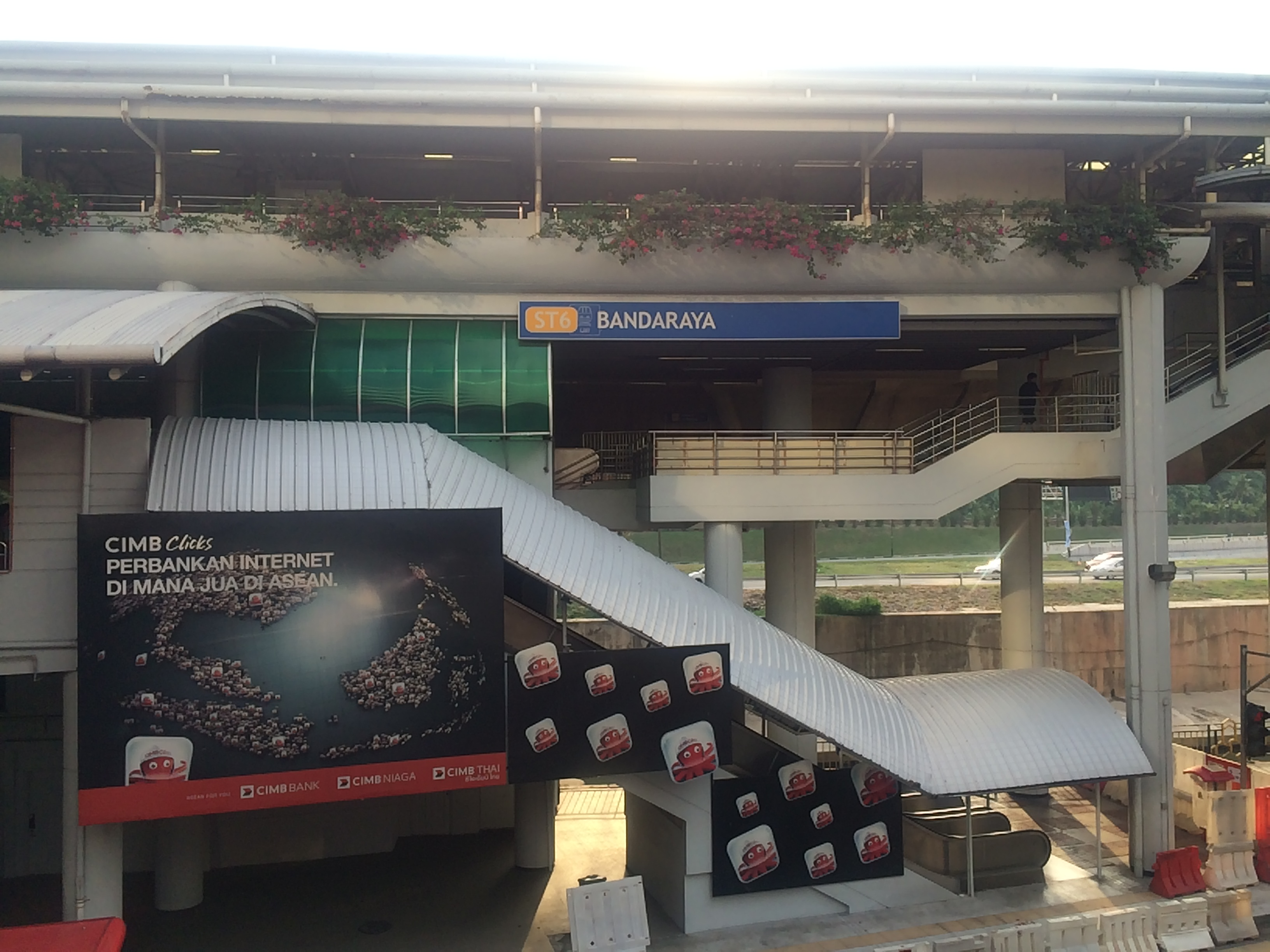
Exterior view from the SOGO link bridge

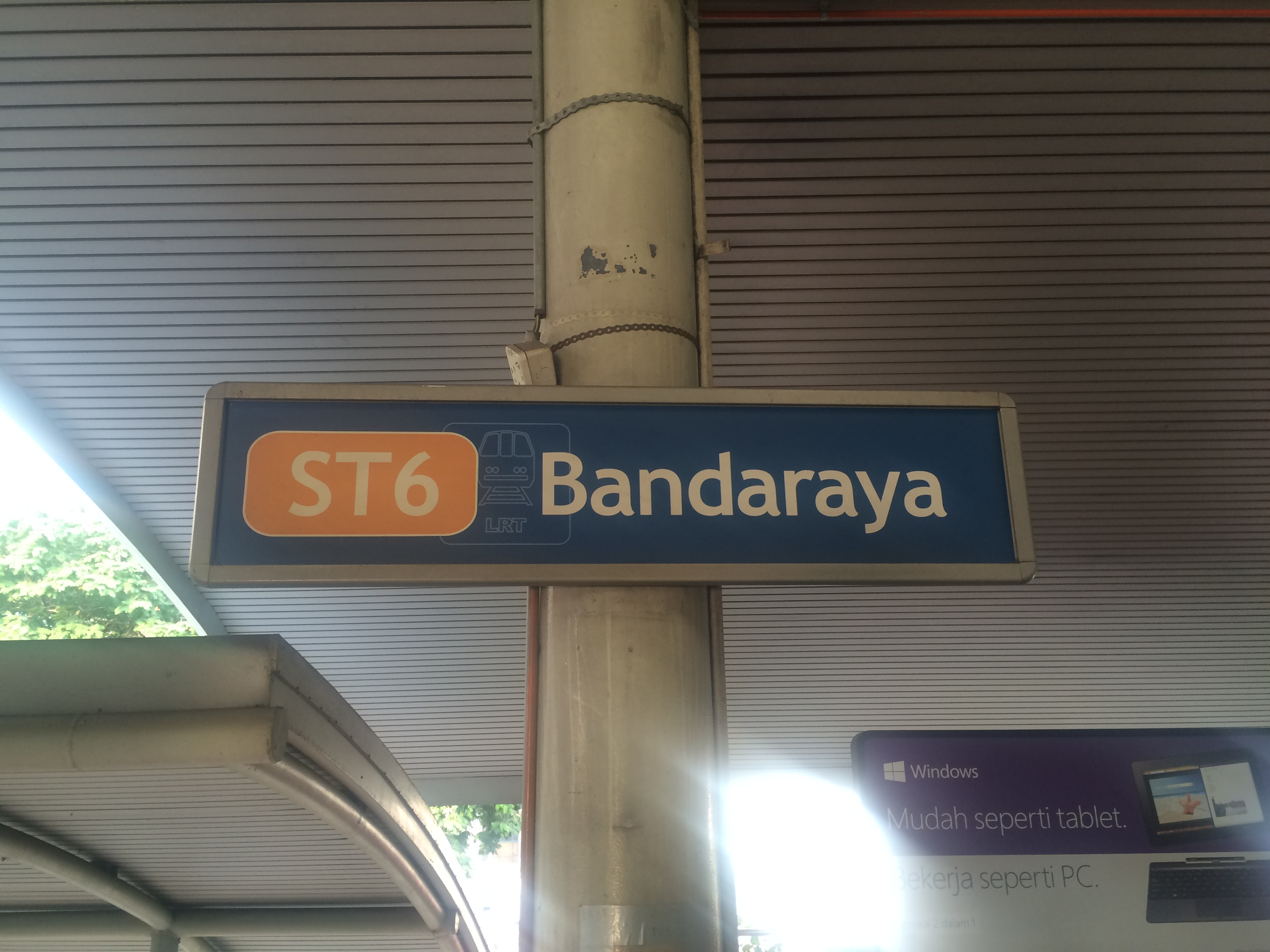
Station's old platform board

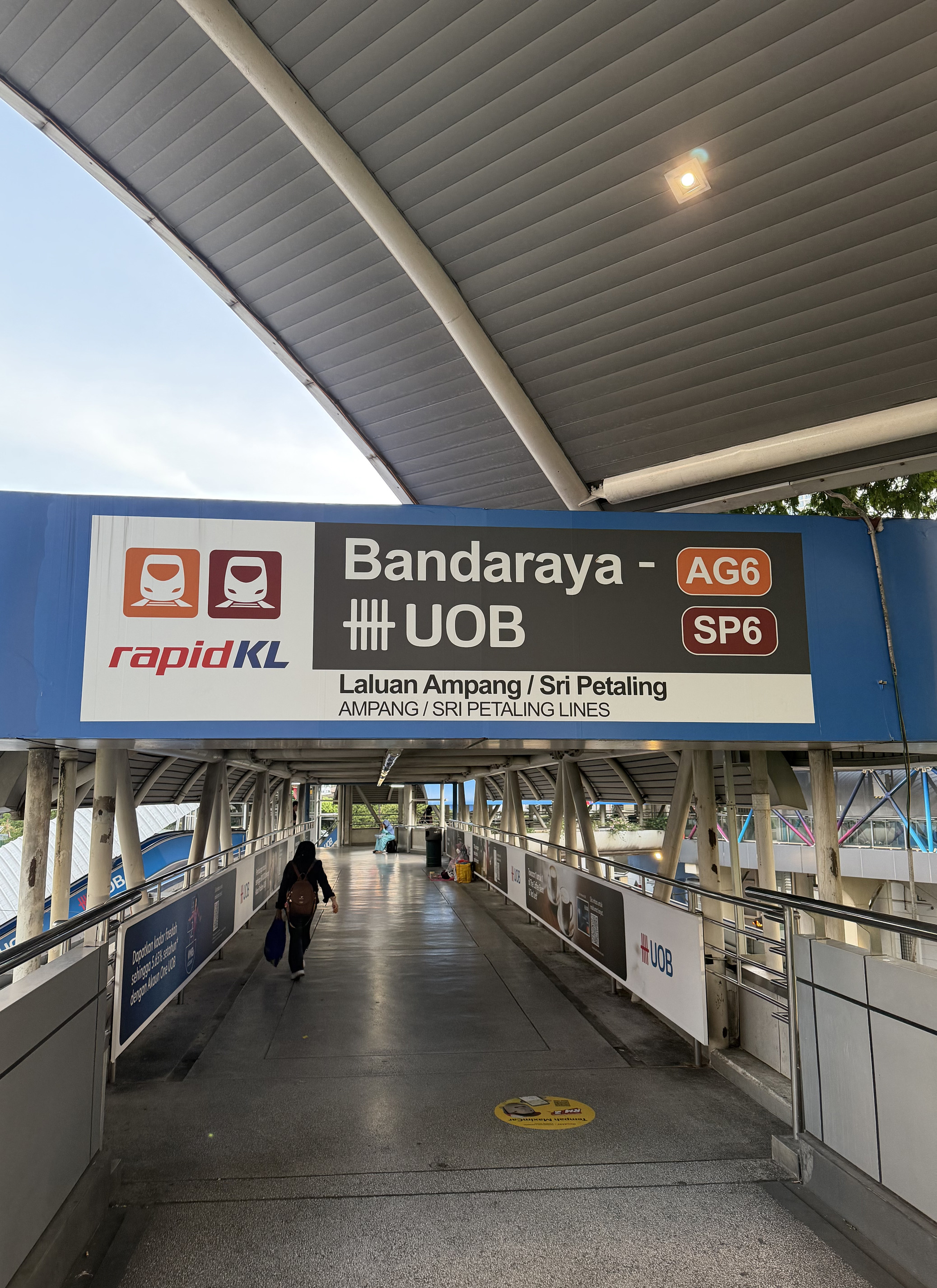
View of the current station entrance from SOGO link bridge.

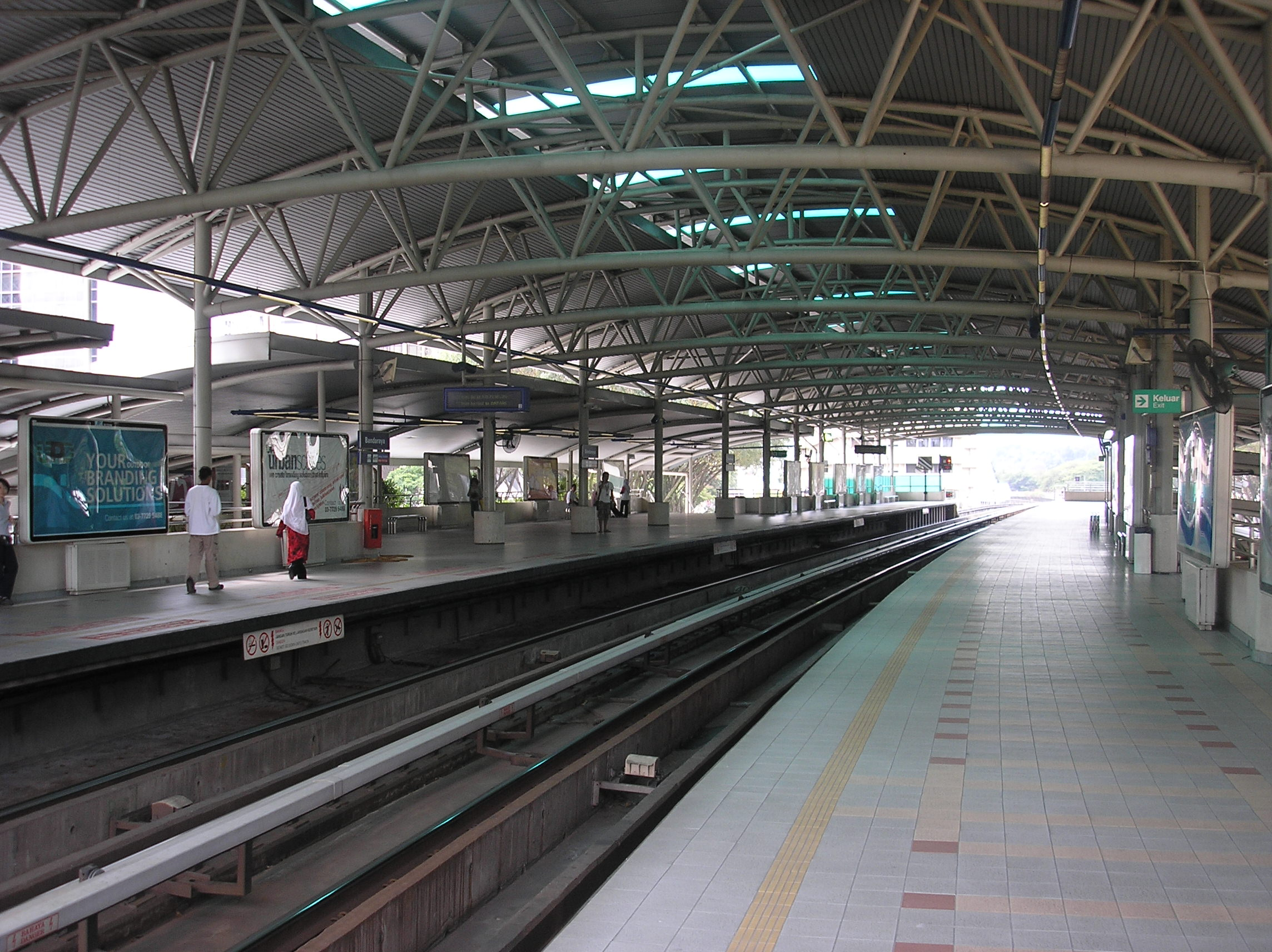
A platform view of the Bandaraya station

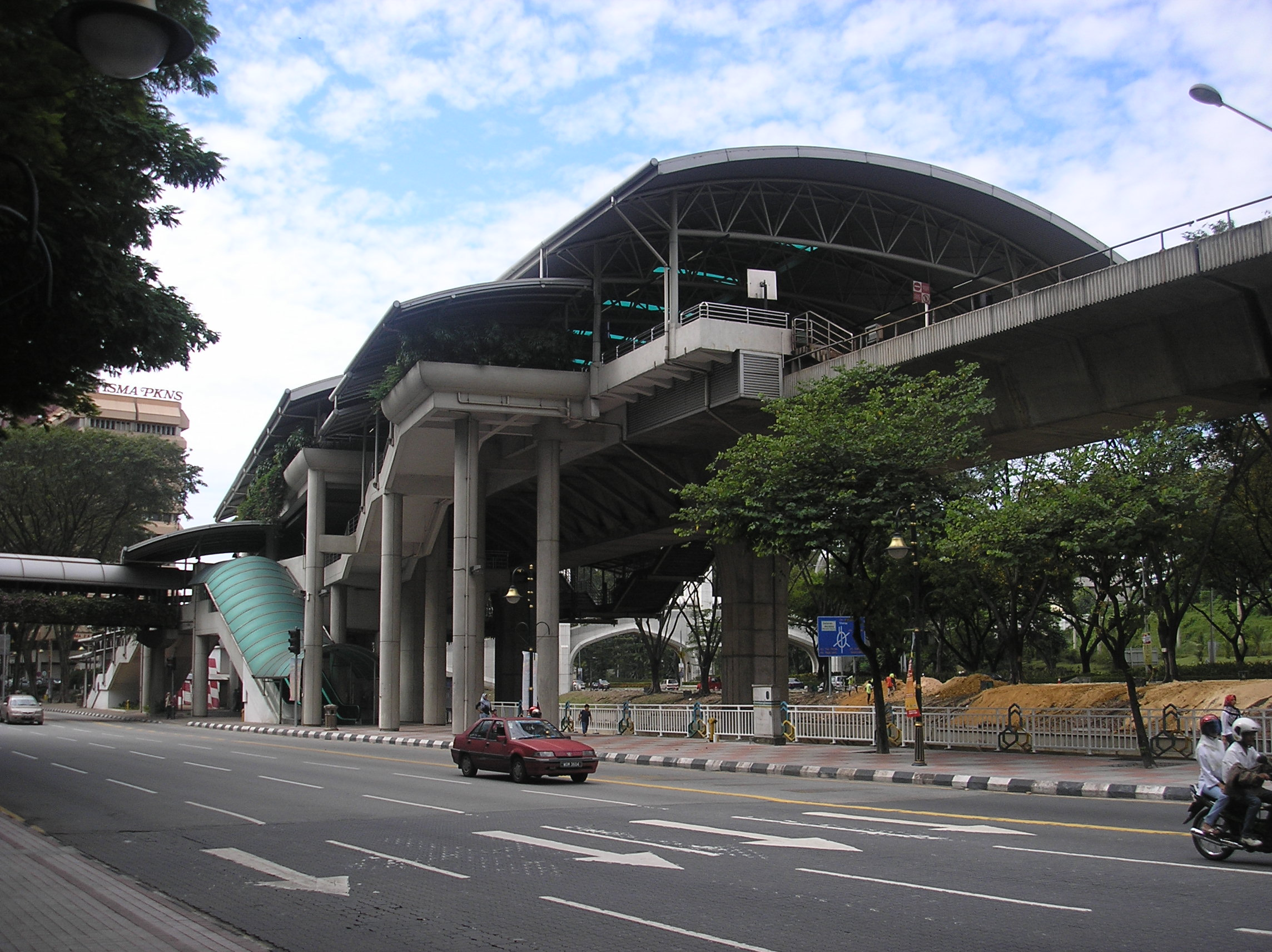
An exterior view of the station, facing southwest

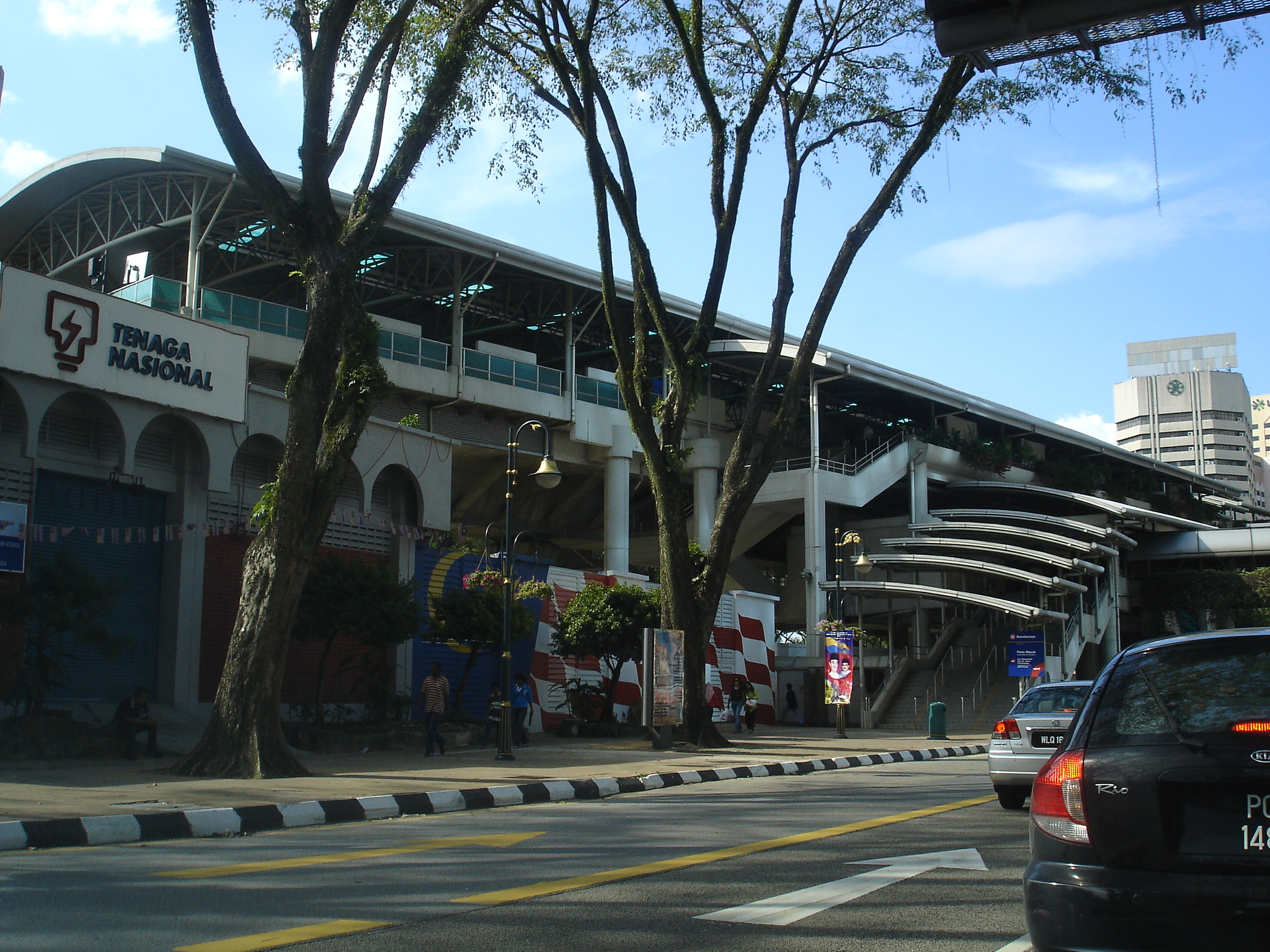
Another exterior view of the station, facing northwest

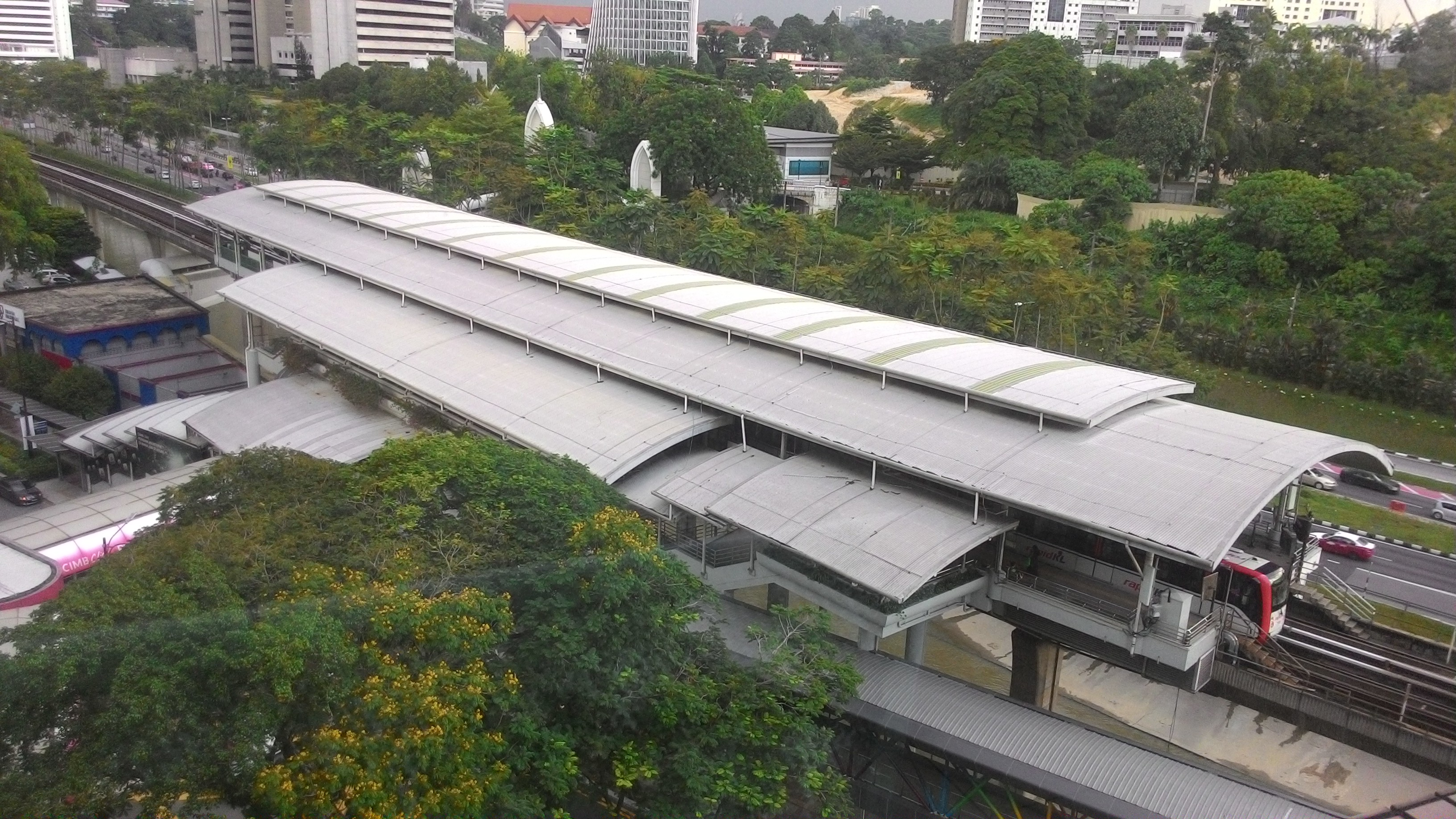
View of the entire station from the SOGO department store

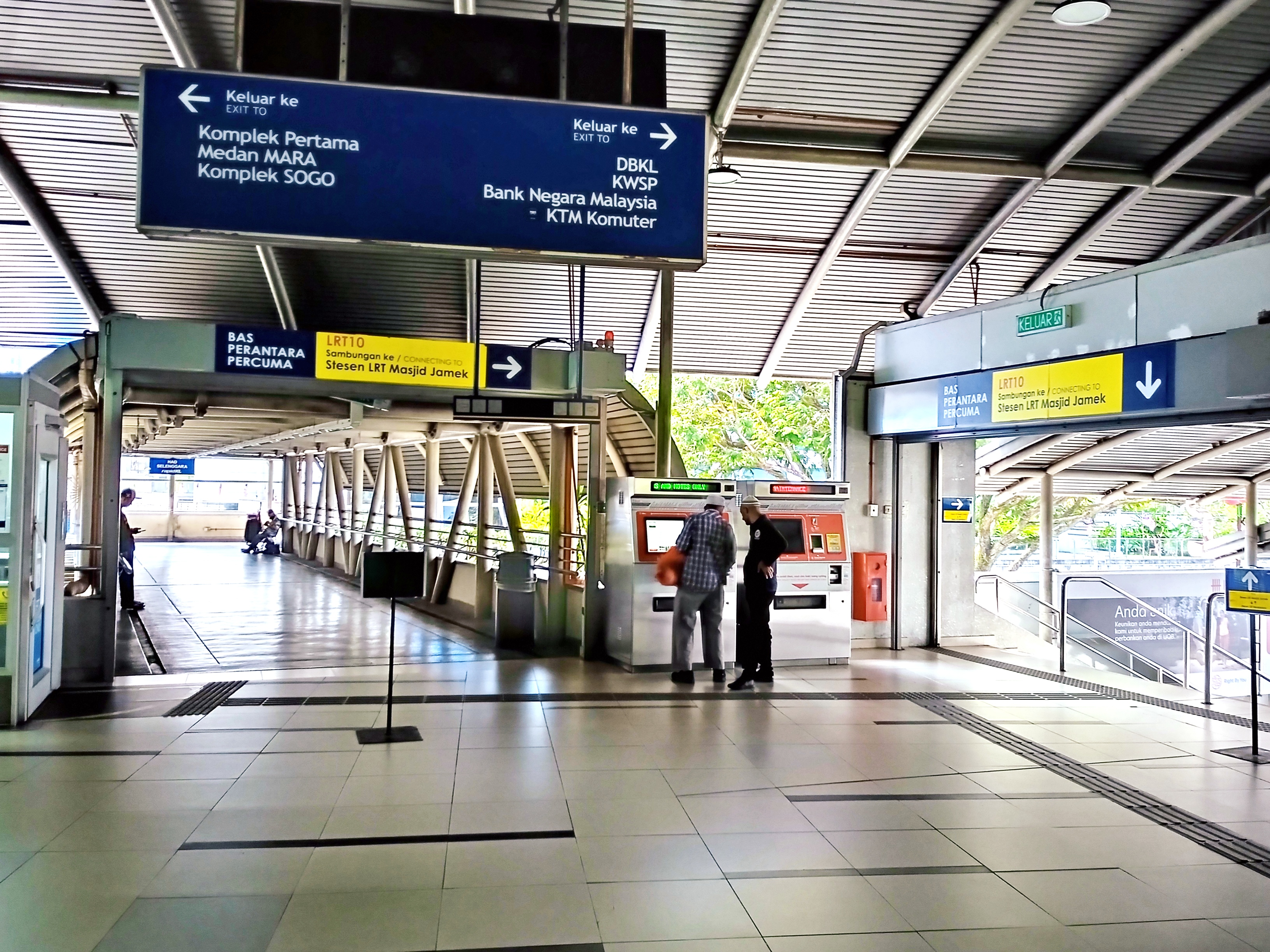
View of the station's concourse

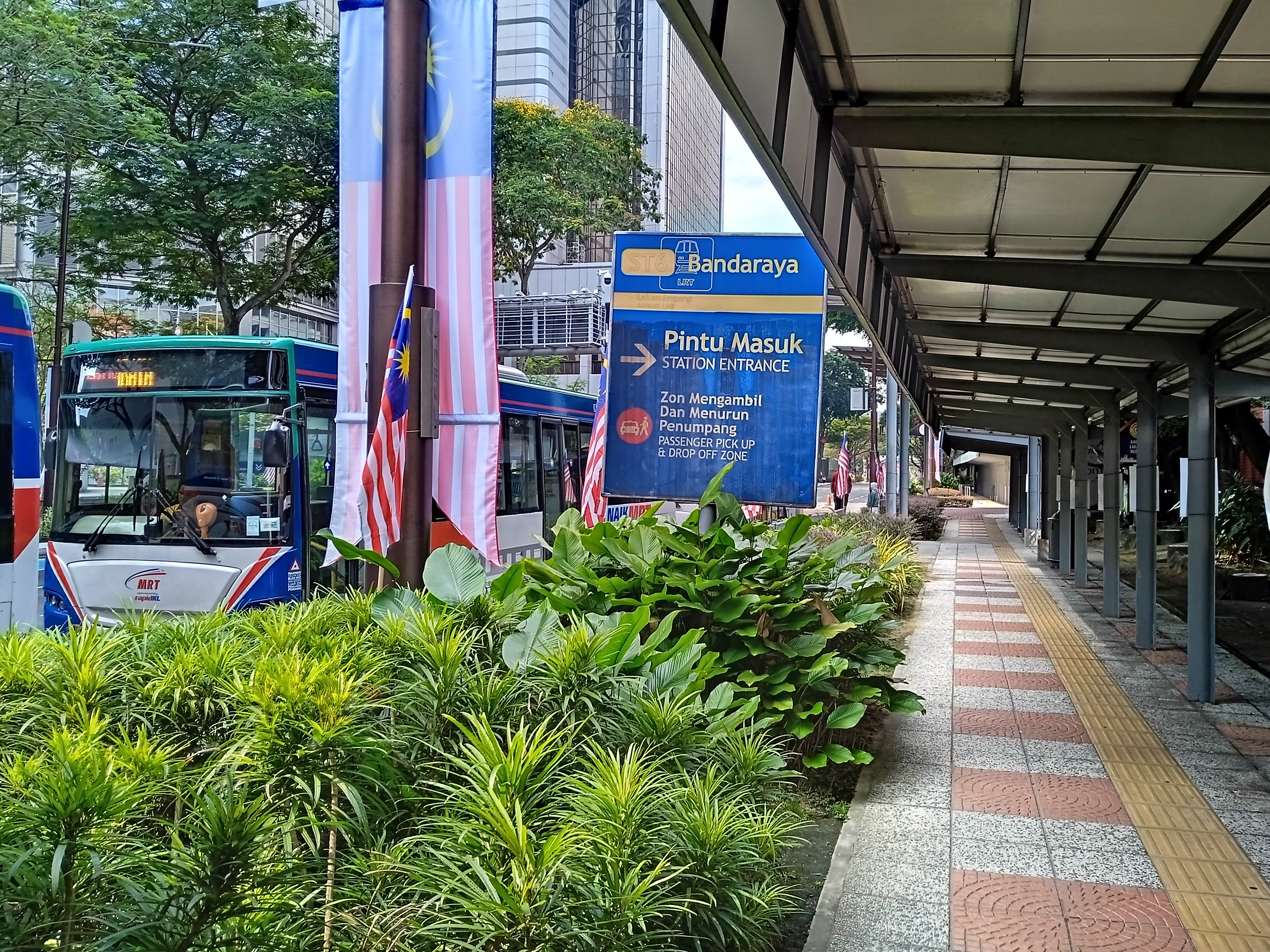
Station's bus lay-by

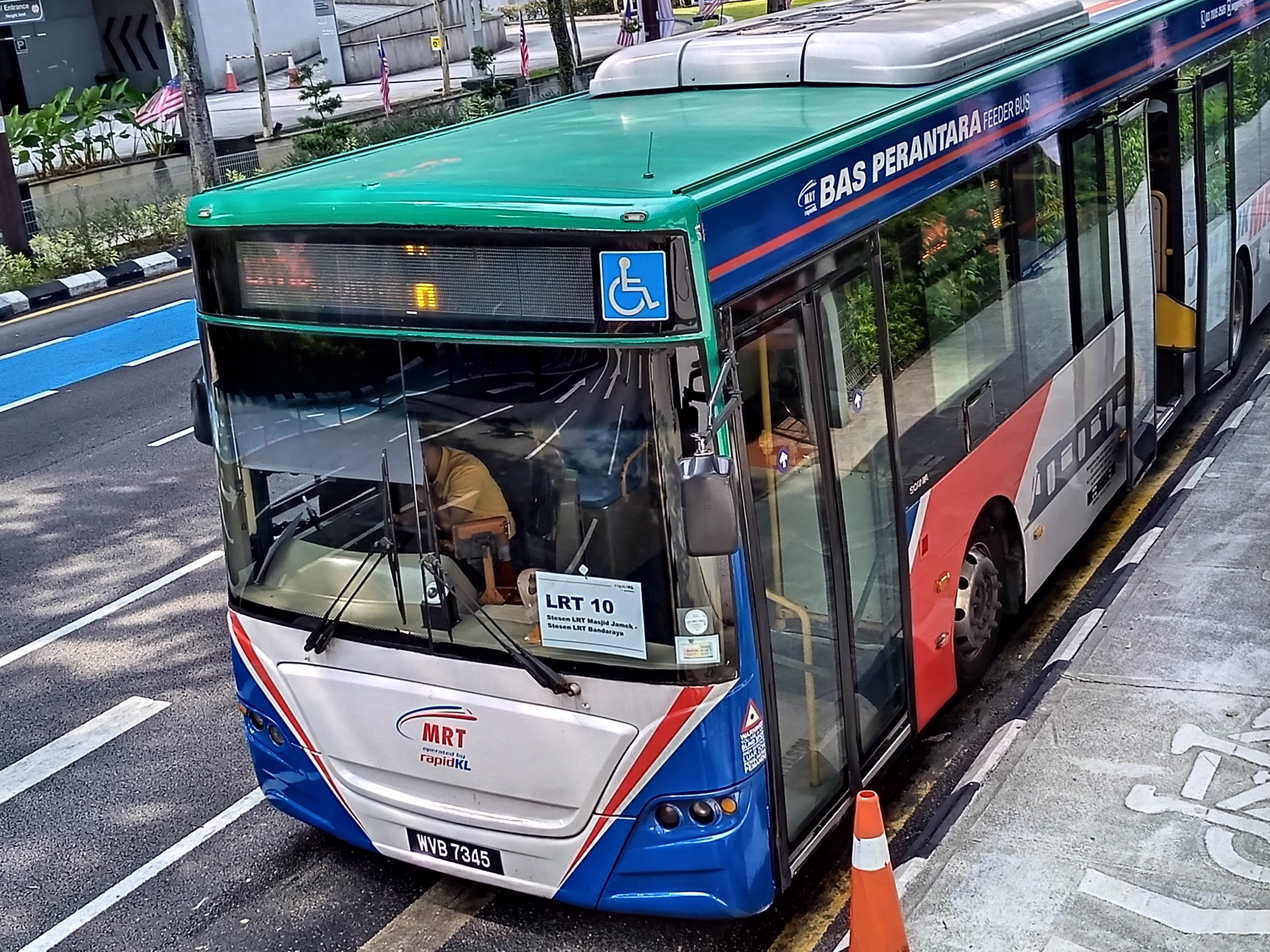
Former LRT 10 Shuttle Bus waiting below the station

== See also ==
- List of rail transit stations in Klang Valley
