= Bandar Puteri LRT station =

Metro station in Puchong, Malaysia

Coordinates: 3°1′1.4″N 101°36′46.2″E

SP27 Bandar Puteri
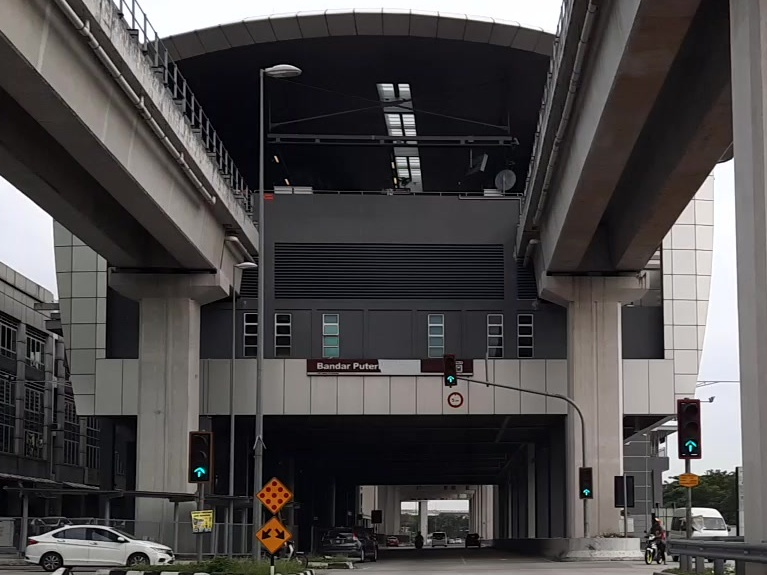

General information
- Other names: Malay: باندر ڤوتري (Jawi); Chinese: 公主城; Tamil: பண்டார் புத்திரி
- Location: Jalan Puchong–Dengkil, Bandar Puteri Puchong, 47100 Puchong; Selangor; Malaysia
- System: Rapid KL
- Owner: Prasarana Malaysia
- Operator: Rapid Rail
- Line: 4 Sri Petaling Line
- Platforms: 1 island platform
- Tracks: 2

Construction
- Structure type: Elevated
- Parking: Not available

Other information
- Station code: SP27

History
- Opened: 31 March 2016; 10 years ago

Services
Preceding station		Following station
Taman Perindustrian Puchong towards Sentul Timur	Sri Petaling Line	Puchong Perdana towards Putra Heights
Location

The Bandar Puteri LRT station is an elevated light rapid transit (LRT) station situated in Bandar Puteri, Puchong. It is served by the LRT Sri Petaling Line and is situated between Puchong Perdana and Taman Perindustrian Puchong stations. Like most other LRT stations operating in the Klang Valley, this station is elevated. However, unlike most LRT stations on the Sri Petaling Line, this station has an island platform instead of two side platforms.

The station is located near Puteri Mart, a market complex with food stalls, a wet market and a few shops. The Bandar Puteri Town Park is also situated nearby. It mainly serves the residences in Bandar Puteri Puchong, along with nearby residential areas such as Puchong Hartamas and Taman Puchong Utama. A transit-oriented development project which consist of SOVO office suites and retail shops was also built near the station.

The station is a part of the LRT Sri Petaling Line extension project announced in 2006. It was opened on 31 March 2016, along with 3 other stations in Puchong.

== History ==
The extension of both the Sri Petaling Line and Kelana Jaya Line was announced on 29 August 2006 by the then Deputy Prime Minister of Malaysia Najib Razak. This was also confirmed by then Prime Minister of Malaysia Abdullah Ahmad Badawi in his National Budget speech in 2006.

The extension project, worth RM955.84 million, was awarded to a joint venture (JV) consortium of George Kent (M) Bhd and its partner Lion Pacific Sdn Bhd. Construction started in 2010, while fault-free test runs of the trains started on 22 January 2016. Although it faced some delays, the station was opened on 31 March 2016, as a part of Phase 2 of the extension project.

== Station ==
=== Station layout ===
Due to the lack of space, a drop-off spot was built instead of park-and-ride facilities. A convenience store operated by Mynews.com can be found in the station. The entire station is disabled-friendly, with accessibility lifts, accessible toilets, special gate entrance for wheelchair users and tactile paving provided throughout the station. The trains and station platforms are level with one another, with a minimal gap between the two, allowing for easy boarding with a wheelchair.

P	Platform 2:	4 Sri Petaling Line towards SP31 Putra Heights (→)
P	Island platform, doors will open on the right
P	Platform 1:	4 Sri Petaling Line towards SP1 AG1 Sentul Timur (←)
C	Concourse level	Ticket vending machine, entrance/exit gates, convenience store, customer service office
G	Street level	Drop off spot, bus stop
refers to accessibility lift for disabled.

=== Infrastructure ===
As part of a green initiative, the extension includes green practices. Energy-efficient lights and rainwater harvesting systems were installed in every station. Windows were designed to allow sunlight into the stations. Construction utilized sustainable materials and recycling practices.

=== Entrances and exits ===
Bandar Puteri LRT station has a total of two entrances/exits, one heading towards the industrial area (kawasan perindustrian) owned by Tractors Malaysia, another leads to Puteri Mart and the shopping district of Bandar Puteri.

Sri Petaling Line station
Entrance	Location	Destination	Picture
A	West side	Industrial area (Tractors Malaysia)	
B	East side	Puteri Mart, Bandar Puteri	

== Bus services ==
=== Feeder buses ===
Route No.	Origin	Destination	Via	Connecting to
T605	SP27 Bandar Puteri	Puchong Hartamas	Taman Perindustrian Pusat Bandar Puchong; Taman Puchong Hartamas; Taman Puchong Hartamas 2 Bandar Puteri Puchong	Terminus

=== Other buses ===
Route No. (Note: None of these buses stop directly at Bandar Puteri LRT station. However, they can be reached by a short walk.)	Origin	Destination	Via	Connecting to
601	Kotaraya / KJ14 KG16 Pasar Seni (Hub D)	Putra Perdana	KHSTa HST INT KINTe	503
604	Kotaraya / KJ14 KG16 Pasar Seni (Hub D)	Taman Saujana Puchong / Bandar Bukit Puchong 1	KHSTa HST INT KINTe	T602
608	SP24 IOI Puchong Jaya	Pulau Meranti	KHSTa HST KINTe	Terminus

== Transit-Oriented Development (TOD) ==
In 2019, IOI Properties launched Stellar Suites, which is the first transit oriented development in Puchong. The project, which consists of a small office-versatile office (Sovo) tower and retail shops, was built just 50m from the Bandar Puteri LRT station. An affordable housing project near the station was also planned by Perbadanan PR1MA Malaysia (PR1MA), but it was never realised.
