= Bangi–Putrajaya Expressway =

Proposed road in Malaysia

Bangi-Putrajaya Elevated Highway

Route information
- Maintained by Putrajaya Perdana Expressways Sdn Bhd (PPE)
- Length: 31.25 km (19.42 mi)
- Existed: 2014–present
- History: TBA

Major junctions
- West end: Kajang–Seremban Highway
- B17 Jalan Reko; North–South Expressway Southern Route
- East end: FT 29 Putrajaya-Cyberjaya Expressway

Location
- Country: Malaysia
- Primary destinations: Bangi; Seri Kembangan

Highway system
- Highways in Malaysia; Expressways; Federal; State

The Bangi-Putrajaya Expressway (BPE) is a proposed expressway in Klang Valley, Malaysia. The 17-kilometre (11 mi) expressway connects Seri Kembangan, Kinrara, and Putrajaya. There are two sections of the expressway: the Kinrara-Putrajaya Section and Seri Kembangan.

The kilometre marker for the expressway is a continuation from the Kinrara–Damansara Expressway (now Petaling Jaya Dispersal Link Expressway)

== History ==
The proposed BPE is an intra-urban expressway completing the "missing links" to the planned and existing expressway and highway networks within the Greater Kuala Lumpur. Integrating with the proposed Kinrara–Damansara Expressway (KIDEX) (now Petaling Jaya Dispersal Link Expressway) at Kinrara, the SKIP-KIDEX expressway will complement the intra-urban expressway network to service the travel desire route between the North and North-Eastern sector such as Damansara and Ampang and the South-Eastern sector such as Serdang, Kinrara, Putrajaya/Cyberjaya and Kuala Lumpur International Airport (KLIA) areas.

The project for the Serdang–Kinrara–Putrajaya Expressway was awarded by the Putrajaya Perdana Berhad (PPB), a company of construction, property development and expressway concessionaires in 2012. Putrajaya Perdana Expressways Sdn Bhd (PPE) (a member of Putrajaya Perdana Berhad), the developer of the expressway, was expected to begin construction of the project in early 2015. The project is expected to take three years to complete.

== Features ==
- There are five toll plazas.
- Act as a bypass for Puchong.

== Interchanges list (planning) ==
Legend:

- I/C - Interchange, I/S - Intersection, RSA - Rest and service area, OBR - Overhead bridge restaurant, R/R - Restaurant and rest plaza, L/B - Layby, V/P - Vista point, TN - tunnel, T/P - Toll plaza, BR - Bridge
- C - Cloverleaf, S - Stack, T-A - Trumpet-A, T-B - Trumpet-B, DT - Directional-T/Y, SDT - Semi-Directional-T/Y, P-Y - Partial-Y, D - Diamond, P-C - Partial cloverleaf, D-D - Diverging diamond, D-R - Direct ramp

=== Kinrara-Putrajaya Section ===
Km	Exit	Flyover section	Interchange	Destination	Note
		Kinrara	Kinrara I/C	FT 217 Bukit Jalil Highway	Interchange
		Kinrara	Ayer Hitam I/C		Interchange
			Lestari Perdana Toll Plaza	Touch 'n Go SmartTAG MyRFiDMyRFiD SmartTAG Touch 'n Go	
			Lestari Perdana I/C	Serdang Section – Seri Kembangan, Serdang	Expressway interchange
		Lestari Puchong	Lestari Puchong Toll Plaza	Touch 'n Go SmartTAG MyRFiDMyRFiD SmartTAG Touch 'n Go	
		Lestari Puchong	Lestari Puchong I/C		Interchange
		Lestari Puchong	Putrajaya I/C	FT 29 Putrajaya–Cyberjaya Expressway	Interchange

=== Serdang Section ===
Km	Exit	Flyover section	Interchange	Destination	Note
		Lestari Perdana	Lestari Perdana I/C	Kinrara–Putrajaya Section – Bandar Kinrara, Puchong, Putrajaya, Cyberjaya	Expressway interchange
		Serdang	Seri Kembangan I/C		Interchange
		Serdang	Serdang Toll Plaza	Touch 'n Go SmartTAG MyRFiDMyRFiD SmartTAG Touch 'n Go	
		Serdang	Serdang I/C	North–South Expressway Southern Route	Interchange
