= Bandar Kinrara =

Coordinates: 3.0506289°N 101.649001°E

- Interactive map of Bandar Kinrara
- Country: Malaysia
- State: Selangor
- Establishment: 1991

Government
  - Administered by: Subang Jaya City Council
- Time zone: UTC+8 (MST)

Bandar Kinrara is a township in Puchong, Selangor, Malaysia. The Ayer Hitam Forest Reserve is situated to its south. Island & Peninsular Berhad commenced the township development under Perumahan Kinrara Berhad in 1991. The only link road to the development then was via Jalan Puchong before entering Kinrara Army Camp road. Bandar Kinrara 1 (BK 1) was constructed for low-cost terrace houses before Bandar Kinrara 2 (BK 2) double storey terraces begun construction. The construction of Bukit Jalil Highway (Federal route 217) helped Bandar Kinrara to expand the development phase on both side of the highway. An underpass linked both sides of the development.

== Background ==
The construction of Kinrara began in 1991 and was developed by Perumahan Kinrara Berhad (A member of I&P Group Sdn Berhad) It comprises a land area of 1,904 acres (771 hectares). It is used to be a rubber estate known as Kinrara Estate. Bandar Kinrara is divided into sections BK 1–9. BK 1-3 are located on the northern side of the Bukit Jalil Highway heading towards Puchong while BK 4-9 are located on the southern side of the highway.

== Facilities ==
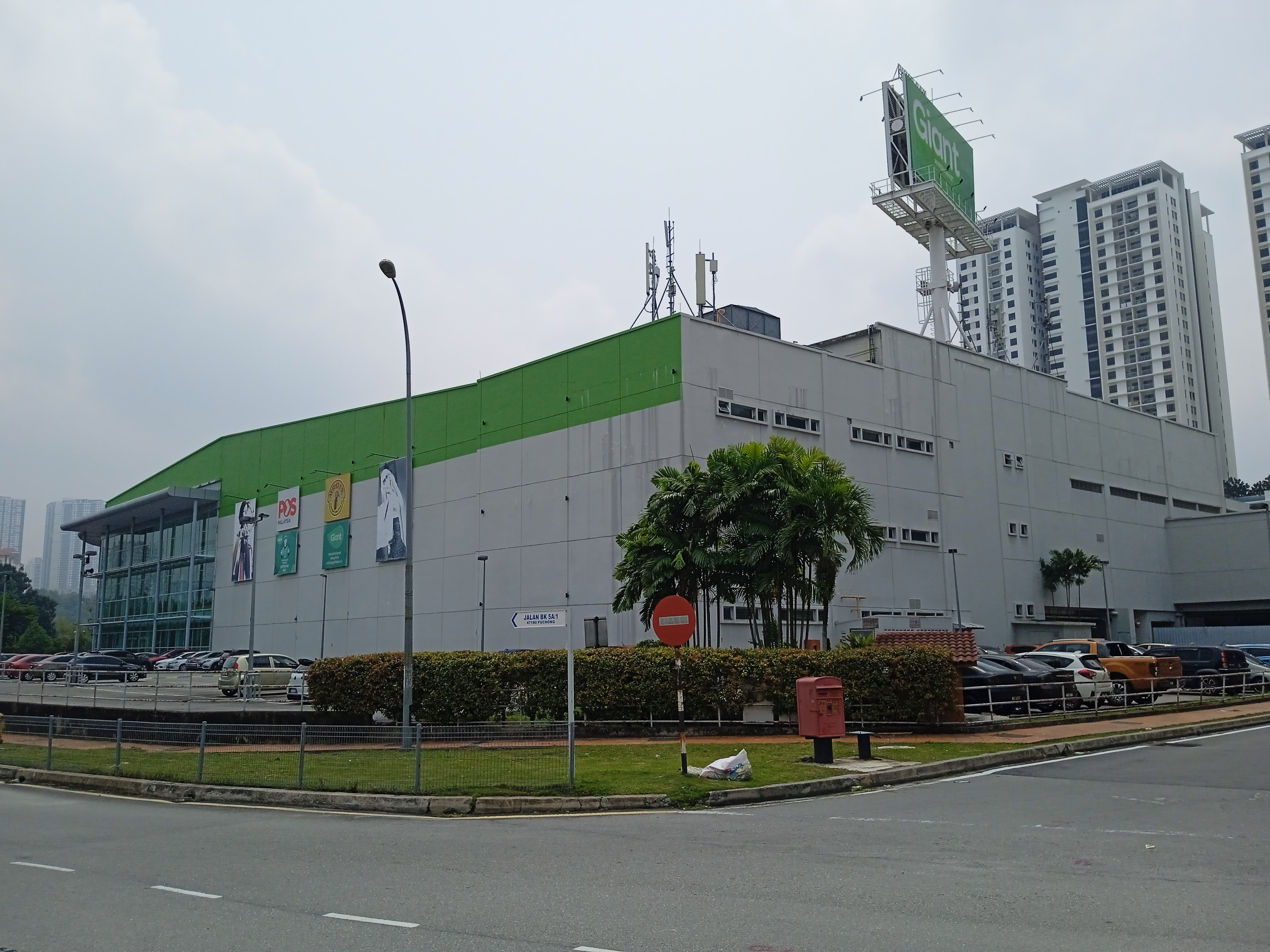
Giant Bandar Kinrara

A Giant shopping complex is located here and was opened in 2008. An international cricket ground named Kinrara Academy Oval was completed in 2003.

There is also a youth centre consisting of covered futsal arenas and badminton courts and a natural buffer zone in a form of a forest reserve to the south called Ayer Hitam Forest Reserve which has been lately re-gazetted by the current state government as permanent reserved.

The IPD Serdang Police District Headquarters is located at Bandar Kinrara 5 (BK 5). Near the police headquarters is the 18-hole Kinrara Golf Club. It is open to the public and also offers facilities such as resorts, tennis courts, swimming pool and fitness center. It also offer 103 rooms hotel accommodation for its visitors.

Masjid Al-Ehsan serves as the township's main mosque in BK 5, while there is also the Sri Maha Mariamman Hindu Temple in BK 1. Mongkon Chakawan (Thai Buddhist Temple) is located in BK 2/7.

The transportation in Bandar Kinrara has improved as well. The township is serviced by both bus and rail transport. Under the LRT Extension Project (LEP), the LRT Sri Petaling Line now passes through Bandar Kinrara. BK 1 and BK 9 residents can access the line at the Alam Sutera station located beside the industrial area of Bandar Kinrara 1 on the Bukit Jalil Highway. Entrances to the station are opposite Mercedes Benz Kinrara and beside Alam Sutera Petronas petrol station on the other side of the highway. Residents of BK 2 to BK 8 have access to the LRT line at the Kinrara BK 5 station, with entrances located beside SMK Seksyen 1 Bandar Kinrara secondary school in BK 2 and opposite Eight Kinrara condominium in BK 5.

== Education ==
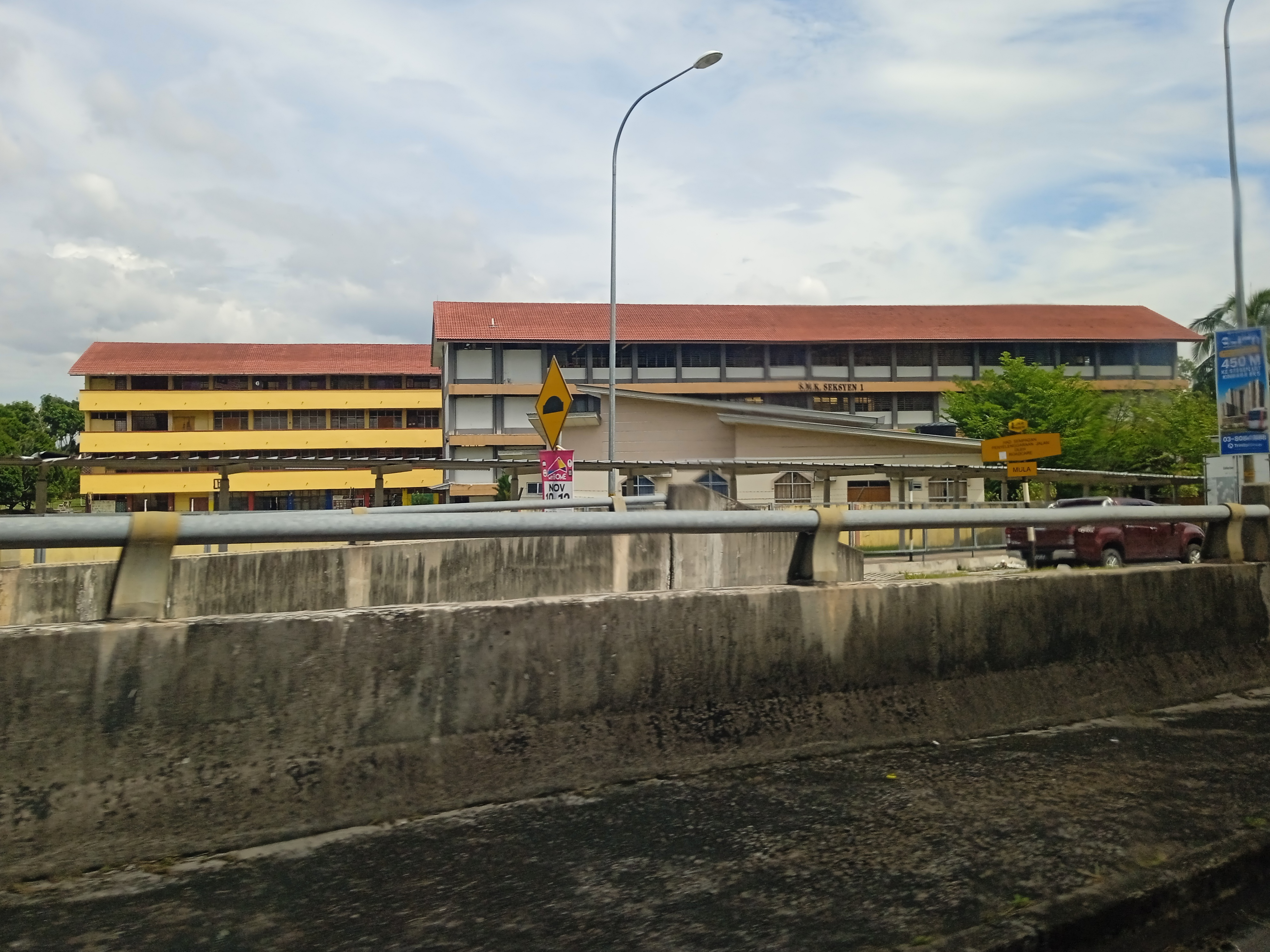
SMK Seksyen 1 Bandar Kinrara

Kinrara is served by several primary and secondary schools within its vicinity. The primary schools include:

- SK Seksyen 1 Bandar Kinrara
- SK Seksyen 2 Bandar Kinrara
- SJK(T) Kinrara
- SJK(C) Yak Chee
- SRA BK 5

The secondary schools are:

- SMK Seksyen 1 Bandar Kinrara
- SMK Seksyen 3 Bandar Kinrara
- SMK Seksyen 4 Bandar Kinrara.

== Accessibility ==
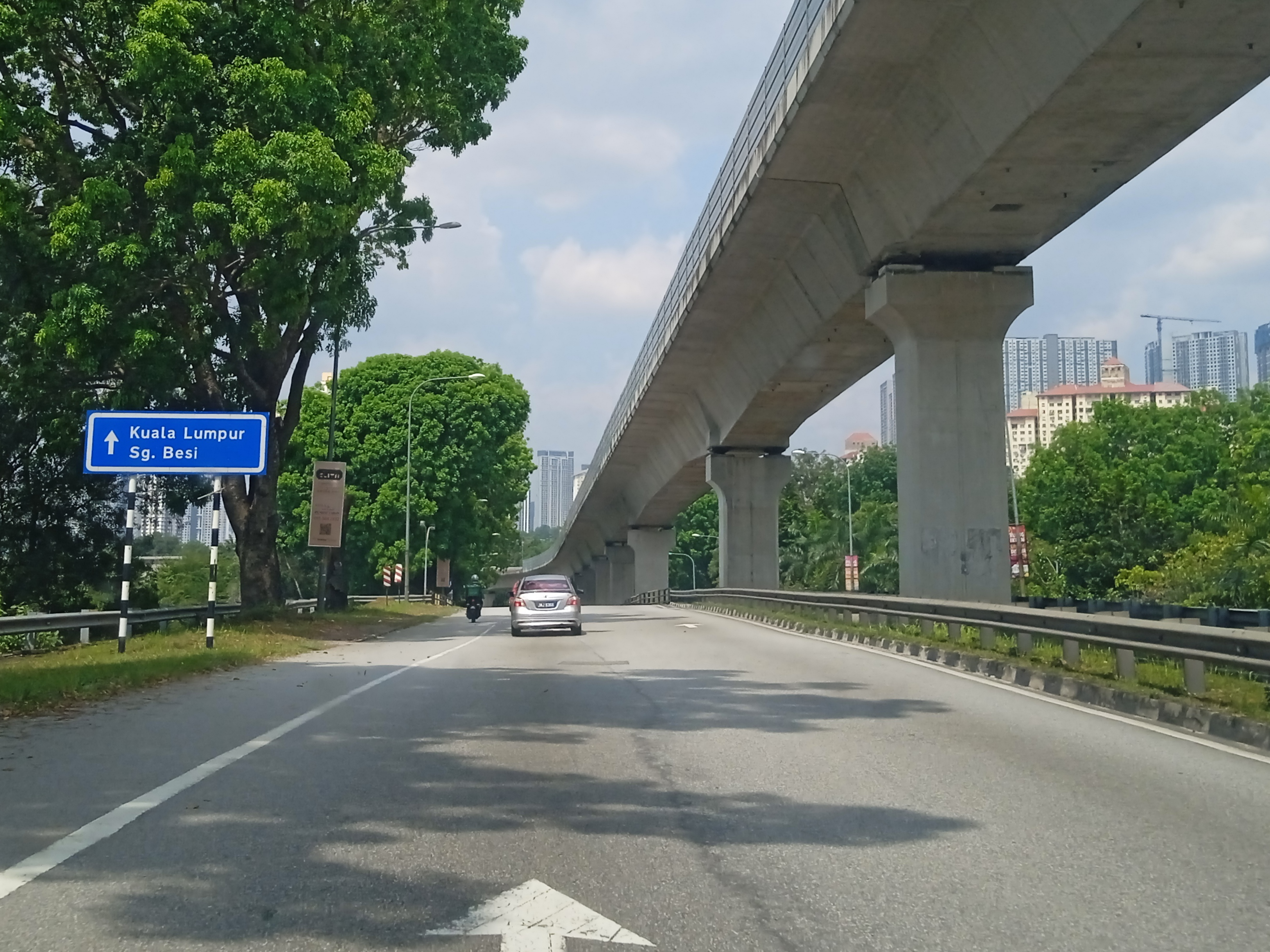
Bukit Jalil Highway section in Bandar Kinrara

The township is accessible from Damansara–Puchong Expressway (LDP), Kuala Lumpur Middle Ring Road 2 (MRR2), New Klang Valley Expressway (NKVE) and New Pantai Expressway (NPE).

It is located 19 km to the Kuala Lumpur City Centre and 7–15 km to Subang Jaya and Petaling Jaya.

Bandar Kinrara is currently accessible by LRT via the Sri Petaling line at both the local Kinrara BK5 station and Alam Sutera station. The duration of travel via LRT towards Masjid Jamek interchange station is approximately 1 hour and 15 minutes.

In the future, Bandar Kinrara will be linked to Petaling Jaya via the Kinrara–Damansara Expressway and to Putrajaya via the Serdang–Kinrara–Putrajaya Expressway.
