= Malaysian Expressway System =

Malaysian Expressway System Sistem Lebuh Raya Ekspres Malaysia 马来西亚高速公路系统 سيستم لبوه راي اكسڤريس مليسيا
- Symbol and highway shield of the Malaysian expressways

- Malaysian Expressway Network Toll road Toll-free under construction/planned

System information
- Maintained by respective concessionaire companies; numbers and routings assigned by Malaysian Highway Authority (MHA).
- Length: 5,027 km (3,124 mi)
- Formed: 1966

Highway names
- Expressways: Expressway nn (E nn)

System links
- Highways in Malaysia; Expressways; Federal; State

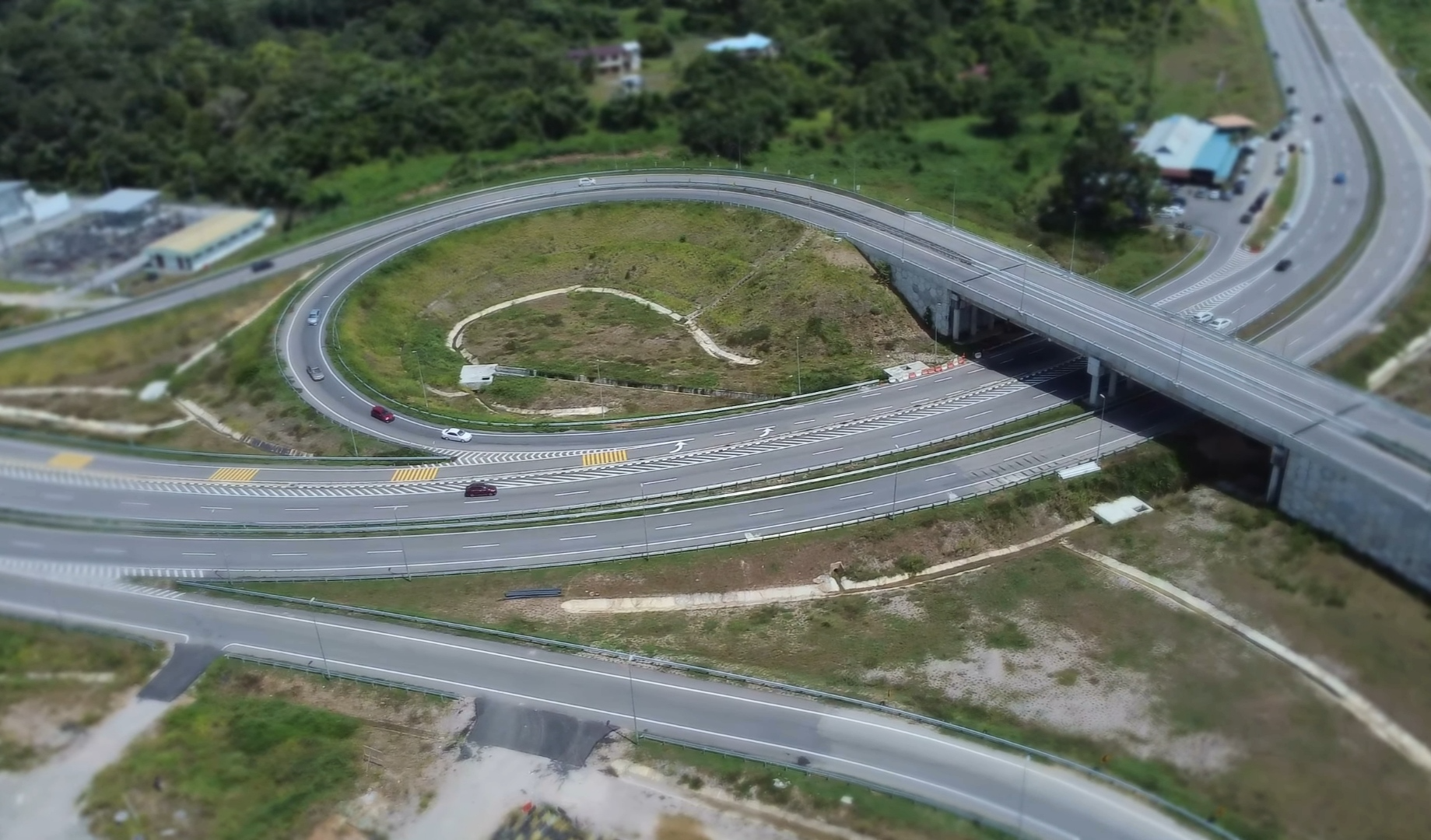
Pan Borneo Highway is the longest toll-free expressway in Malaysia

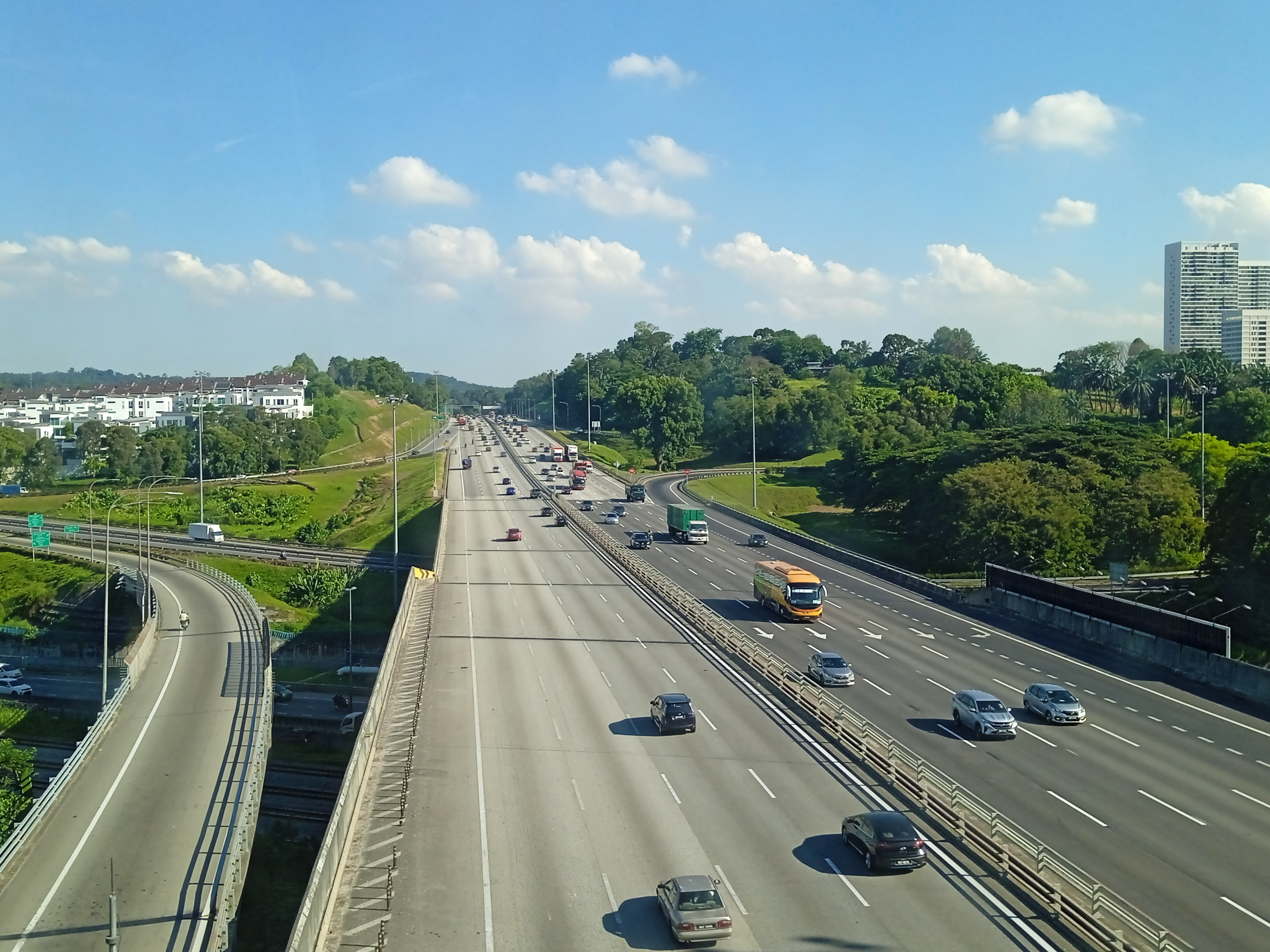
North–South Expressway is the longest toll expressway in Malaysia

The Malaysian Expressway System (Malay: Sistem Lebuh Raya Ekspres Malaysia; Chinese: 马来西亚高速公路系统; Jawi: سيستم لبوه راي اكسڤريس مليسيا) is a network of national controlled-access expressways in Malaysia that forms the primary backbone network of Malaysian national highways. The network began with opening of the Tanjung Malim–Slim River tolled road (part of Federal Route 1) which was opened to traffic on 16 March 1966, followed by the construction of the North–South Expressway (NSE). The system continues to be substantially developed. Malaysian toll road-expressways are built by private companies under the supervision of the government highway authority, Malaysian Highway Authority (abbreviated as MHA; also referred to as Lembaga Lebuhraya Malaysia (LLM) in Malay). While toll-free expressways are built by Malaysian Public Works Department or Jabatan Kerja Raya Malaysia (JKR) in Malay.

== Overview ==
The expressway network of Malaysia is considered as one of the best controlled-access expressway network in Asia and in the world after Japan and South Korea. With total length over 5,027 kilometres (3,124 mi), of which 2,996 kilometres (1,862 mi) are toll-free expressways and 2,031 kilometres (1,262 mi) are toll-expressways. All Malaysian toll expressways are controlled-access highway and managed in the Build-Operate-Transfer (BOT) system.

There are expressways in West Malaysia and East Malaysia, however, the former are better-connected. The North–South Expressway passes through all the major cities and conurbations in West Malaysia, such as Penang, Ipoh, the Klang Valley and Johor Bahru. The Pan Borneo Highway is the longest toll-free expressways in Malaysia, connects the Malaysian states of Sabah and Sarawak with Brunei.

=== Asian Highway Network ===
Asian Highway route shield.

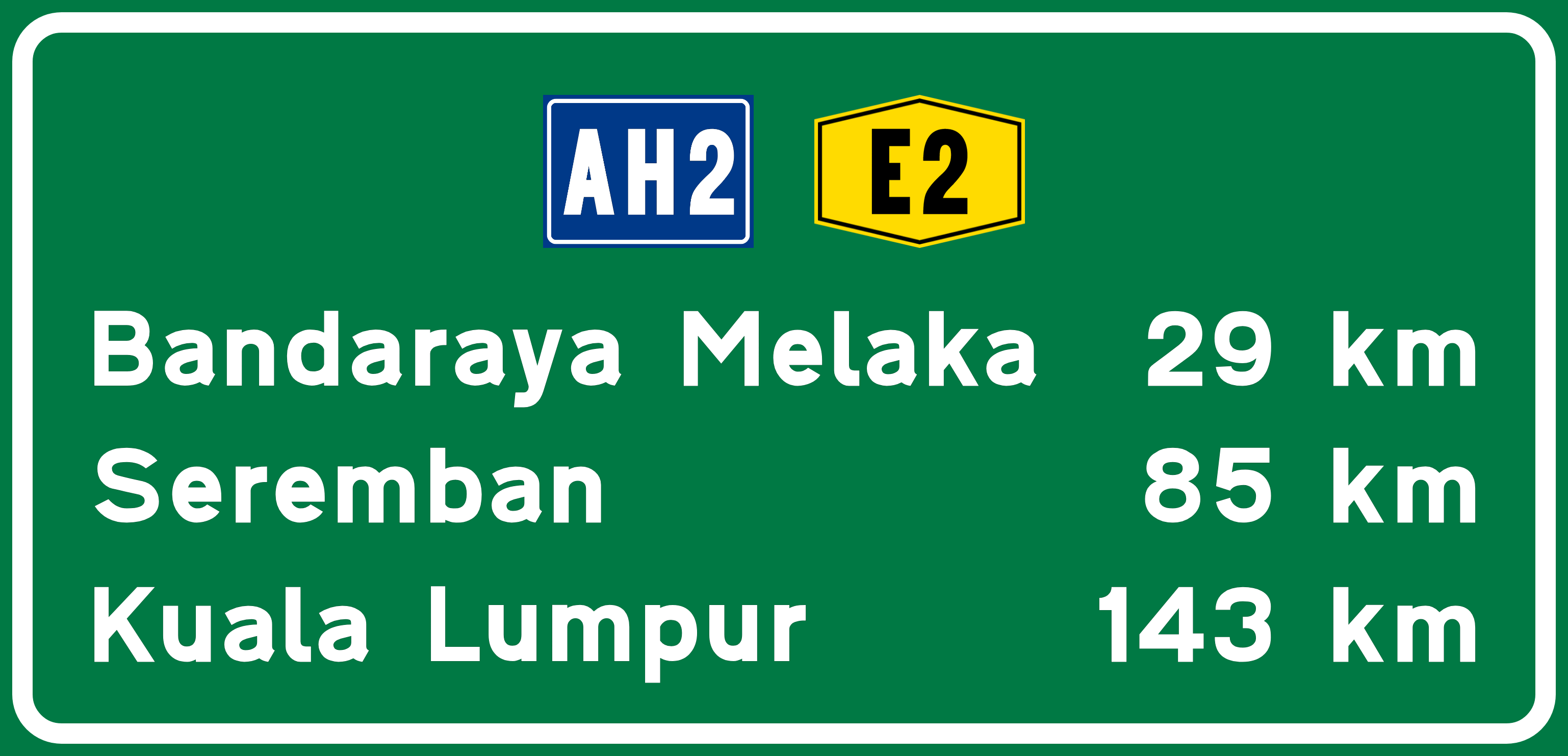
Expressway distance sign with Asian Highway route shield.

A few major expressways in Malaysia are part of the larger Asian Highway Network. The Asian Highway Network is an international project between Asian nations to develop their highway systems, which will form main routes in the network. Seven Asian Highway routes pass through Malaysia:

1. AH2 Asian Highway Route 2 – along the:
  - North–South Expressway Northern Route E1 (Bukit Kayu Hitam-Bukit Lanjan),
  - New Klang Valley Expressway E1 (Bukit Lanjan-Shah Alam),
  - North South Expressway Southern Route E2 (Nilai Utara-Pasir Gudang),
  - North-South Expressway Central Link (ELITE) E6 and;
  - Johor Bahru Eastern Dispersal Link Expressway (JB EDL) E14.
2. AH18 Asian Highway Route 18 – along the Federal Route 3
3. AH140 Asian Highway Route 140 – along the Federal Route 4 and Butterworth–Kulim Expressway E15
4. AH141 Asian Highway Route 141 – consists of New Klang Valley Expressway E1 (Bukit Lanjan–Jalan Duta), Duta–Ulu Klang Expressway E33 (Jalan Duta–Sentul Pasar and Sentul Pasar–Greenwood), Kuala Lumpur Middle Ring Road 2 28 (Greenwood–Gombak North Interchange), Kuala Lumpur–Karak Expressway E8, East Coast Expressway E8 and Gebeng Bypass 101
5. AH142 Asian Highway Route 142 – along the MEC Highway FT222, Tun Razak Highway FT12 and Federal Route 1 (Segamat–Yong Peng South Interchange)
6. AH143 Asian Highway Route 143 – along the Second Link Expressway E3
7. AH150 Asian Highway Route 150 – along the Pan Borneo Highway.

==== AH2 border crossing dispute ====
The status of the route alignment of the Asian Highway 2 crossing the Malaysia–Singapore border is in dispute. Malaysia had commissioned the Second Link Expressway E3 as part of AH2 to maintain the primary access-controlled highway status of the route. Meanwhile, Singapore had commissioned the Johor–Singapore Causeway and the Bukit Timah Expressway as part of AH2, as the Johor–Singapore Causeway is the main gateway to Singapore from Malaysia, which could mean that the Skudai Highway would be included in the route alignment instead of the Second Link Expressway.

The completion of Johor Bahru Eastern Dispersal Link Expressway (EDL) in 2012, the Asian Highway AH2 route were re-routed to Eastern Dispersal Link Expressway (EDL) from Second Link Expressway. Second Link Expressway were gazetted as a part of Asian Highway AH143.

The Second Link Expressway, the Ayer Rajah Expressway, Marina Coastal Expressway and Kallang–Paya Lebar Expressway were later gazetted as Asian Highway AH143.

== History ==
=== Interstate ===
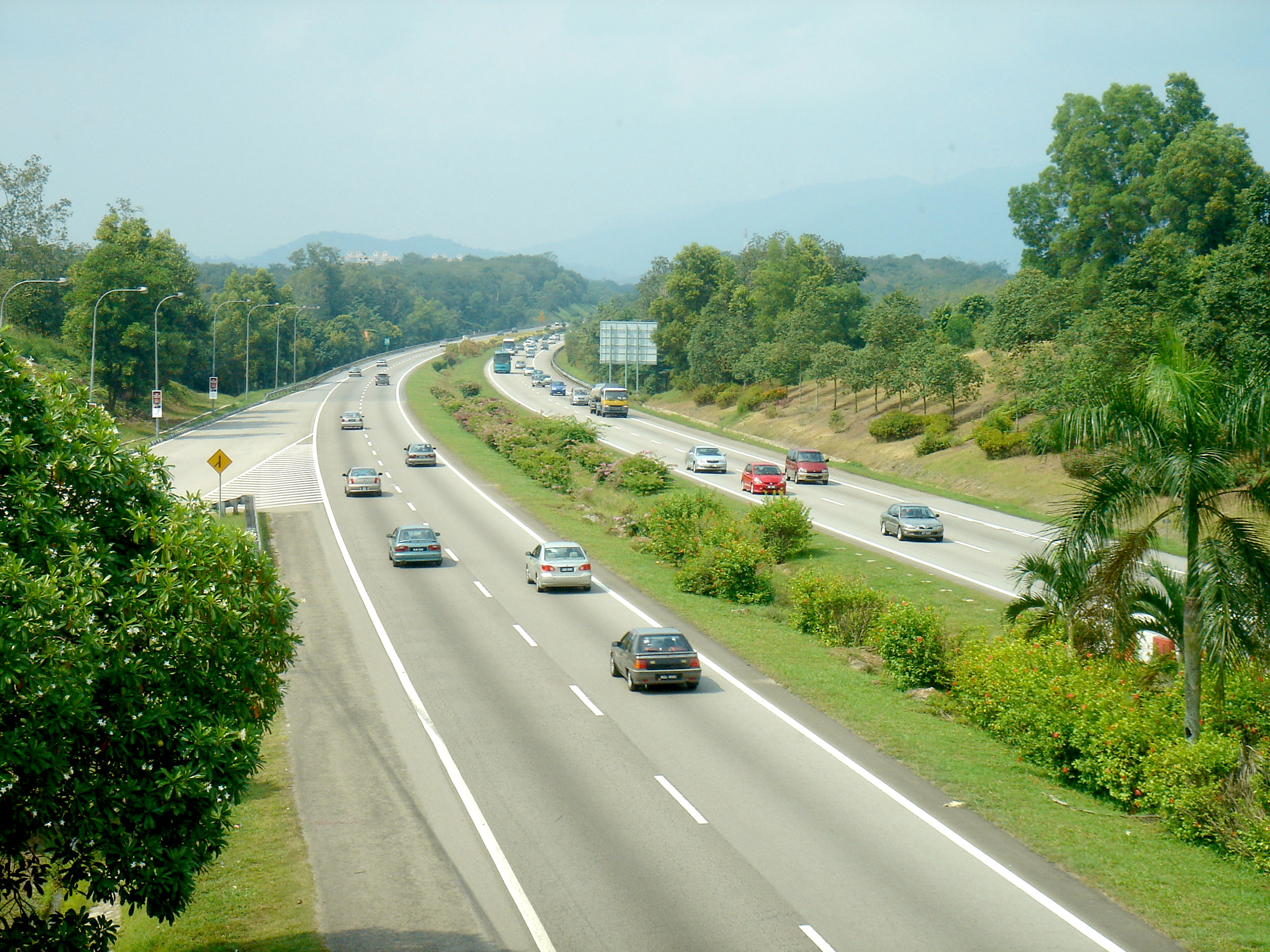
South section of North–South Expressway near Pedas, Rembau District, Negeri Sembilan, facing towards Kuala Lumpur (before being upgraded into six-lane carriageway from 1 July 2005 until 1 July 2007) with Titiwangsa Mountains in the top peak

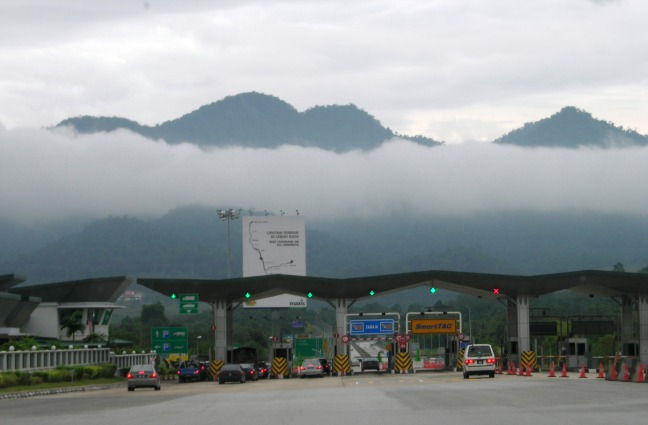
The East Coast Expressway (westbound), looking towards Titiwangsa Range, Pahang.

Before tolled expressways were introduced in the mid-1970s, most Malaysians travelled around Peninsula Malaysia on federal roads.

The major reasons for building new expressways in Malaysia are the increasing number of vehicles along federal routes, the opening of major ports and airports in Malaysia, and the increasing population in major cities and towns of Malaysia.

In 1966, the Highway Planning Unit was established under the Ministry of Works and Communications.

The first tolled highway in Malaysia was the 20-kilometre-length (12 mi) Tanjung Malim–Slim River tolled road (Federal Route 1) which was opened to traffic on 16 March 1966. It saved journey time by half an hour, and cars were charged 50 sen, buses and lorries RM1 and motorcycles 20 sen. However, in 1994, with the completion of the North–South Expressway, the toll plaza was removed and it became a toll-free highway.

In 1970, the first comprehensive five-year road development programme was formulated by the Highway Planning Unit, which included expanding rural roads and plans to construct three new highways linking the east and west coasts.

On 27 March 1974, the Kuala Lumpur–Seremban Expressway was constructed. Funded by a loan by the World Bank, the 63.4-kilometre (39.4 mi) expressway was constructed in three phases; the first phase was from Kuala Lumpur to Nilai, while the second phase was from Nilai to Seremban. The third phase was the rehabilitation of the old Federal Route 1 from Kuala Lumpur to Seremban as a toll-free alternative to motorists. The completion of the Kuala Lumpur–Seremban Expressway in June 1977 marking the first step towards the construction of the new interstate expressway known as North–South Expressway (NSE).

The Kuala Lumpur–Karak Highway (Federal Route 2) was built between 1976 and 1979. Meanwhile, the 900-metre-long (3,000 ft) Genting Sempah Tunnel was the first highway tunnel in Malaysia, constructed between 1977 and 1979. The tunnel was opened in 1979 by the then Minister of Works and Communications, Dato' Abdul Ghani Gilong.

The first sections of the North–South Expressway were the toll sections of the Kuala Lumpur–Seremban Expressway from Sungai Besi to Labu toll plazas, which was opened on 16 June 1982. The next sections were Bukit Kayu Hitam–Jitra and Senai–Johor Bahru stretches opened in 1985. Then the Ipoh–Changkat Jering and Seremban–Ayer Keroh stretches, which were opened to traffic in 1986. However, on 1 October 1987 the closed-toll system came into force along the Kuala Lumpur–Ayer Keroh and Ipoh–Changkat Jering stretches. The Ayer Keroh–Pagoh stretch on the North–South Expressway was opened to traffic in 1988. All sections of the North–South Expressway were completed and officially opened on 8 September 1994 by the former Prime Minister of Malaysia, Tun Dr Mahathir Mohamad.

Other interstate expressway projects in Malaysia are North–South Expressway Central Link (opened 1996), East Coast Expressway (opened 2004) and Kajang–Seremban Highway (opened 2008).

Because of a massive traffic jam on the North–South Expressway Southern Route between Seremban and Nilai in Negeri Sembilan, a new bypass expressway named Paroi–Senawang–KLIA Expressway was proposed in 2013 to help reduce the traffic jams at the area.

The Phase 2 of the East Coast Expressway (Terengganu) linking Jabur and Kuala Terengganu was completed on 31 January 2015, thus completing the alignment of the East Coast Expressway from Kuala Lumpur to Kuala Terengganu.

The new project in the west coast of Peninsula Malaysia, West Coast Expressway (WCE) has been unveiled by the government. Construction of the 233-kilometre-long (145 mi) expressway linking Banting, Selangor and Taiping, Perak was to start in 2015.

=== Greater Kuala Lumpur and Klang Valley ===
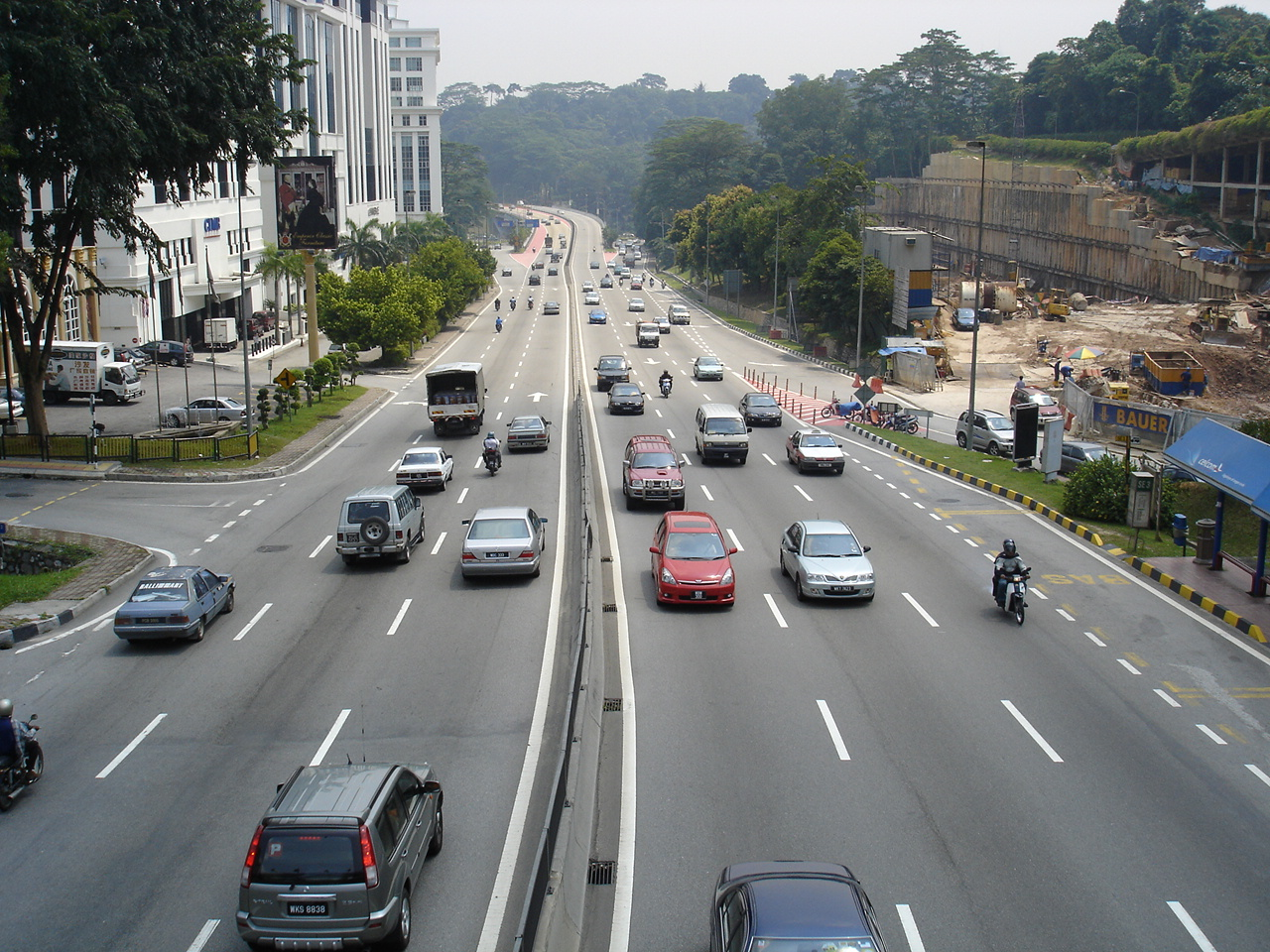
The Damansara Link section of Klang Valley's Sprint Expressway near Semantan.

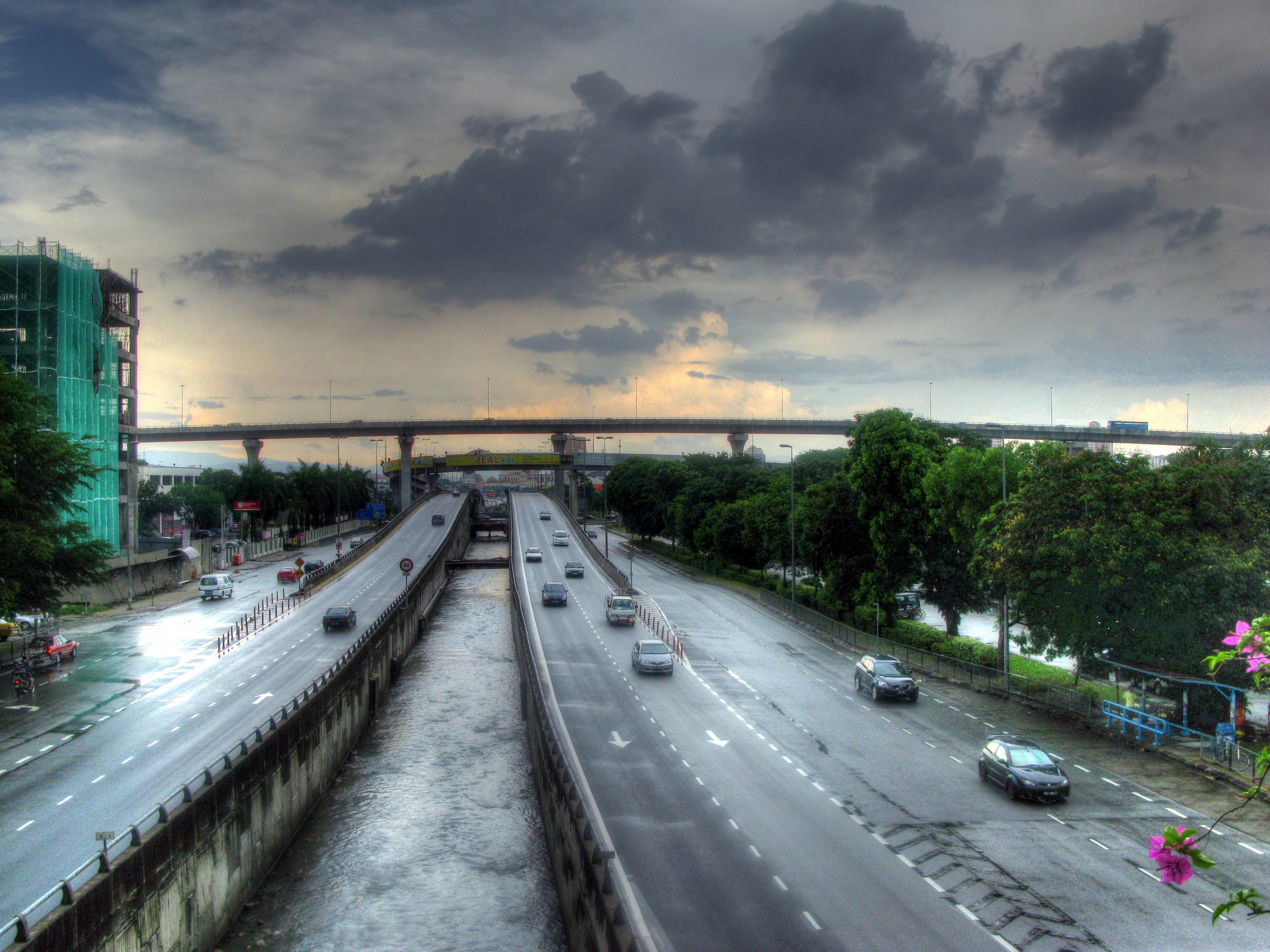
New Pantai Expressway near Subang Jaya.

The history of the highways in the Klang Valley started after the expulsion of Singapore from Malaysia on 9 August 1965, when the Malaysian government decided to make Port Swettenham (now Port Klang) Malaysia's new national port as a replacement for Singapore. As a result, the government planned to build a first highway in Klang Valley known as Federal Highway connecting Port Swettenham (now Port Klang) to Kuala Lumpur in the 1960s.

In 1967, the 45-kilometre (28 mi) Federal Highway (Federal Route 2), the first dual-carriageway highway in Malaysia was opened to traffic.

In the early 1990s the federal government decided to build more expressways and highways in Klang Valley because of the increasing size and population of the Klang Valley conurbation, development of new townships and industrial estates, and the massive traffic jams along Federal Highway.

The New Klang Valley Expressway (NKVE), which was opened in 1990, is the second link to Kuala Lumpur from Klang after Federal Highway. In 1997, North–South Expressway Central Link (NSECL), which is the main link to Kuala Lumpur International Airport (KLIA) was opened to traffic.

Other expressway projects in Klang Valley are Shah Alam Expressway (SAE/KESAS) (opened 1997), Damansara–Puchong Expressway (LDP) (opened 1999), Sprint Expressway (opened 2001), New Pantai Expressway (NPE) (opened 2004), SMART Tunnel (opened 2007), KL–KLIA Dedicated Expressway or Kuala Lumpur–Putrajaya Expressway (KLPE) (now Maju Expressway (MEX)) (opened 2007) and Duta–Ulu Klang Expressway (DUKE) (opened 2009).

In addition to Kuala Lumpur Inner Ring Road (KLIRR) as the inner ring road in Kuala Lumpur, Kuala Lumpur Middle Ring Road 1 (KLMRR1), Kuala Lumpur Western/Northern Dispersal Link Scheme (Sprint Expressway and DUKE) and Kuala Lumpur Middle Ring Road 2 (KLMRR2) also act as middle ring roads of the city. Kuala Lumpur–Kuala Selangor Expressway (KLS) (formerly Assam Jawa–Templer Park Highway (LATAR)), Kajang Dispersal Link Expressway (SILK), South Klang Valley Expressway (SKVE) and the planning Kuala Lumpur Outer Ring Road (KLORR) may form the outer ring roads of Kuala Lumpur.

Following the formation of the Greater Kuala Lumpur in the early 2010s, many expressways and highways will be built in the Greater Kuala Lumpur under the Economic Transformation Programme (ETP). These are the Besraya Extension Expressway (now part of the Besraya Expressway) (opened 2012), Damansara–Shah Alam Elevated Expressway (DASH), Sungai Besi–Ulu Klang Elevated Expressway (SUKE), East Klang Valley Expressway (EKVE) which will be part of the KLORR system, Sri Damansara Link and Tun Razak Link of the DUKE, Kinrara–Damansara Expressway (KIDEX Skyway) and Serdang–Kinrara–Putrajaya Expressway (SKIP). However, the proposed Kinrara–Damansara Expressway (KIDEX Skyway) project was officially scrapped by the Selangor State Government due to the several protests by the local Petaling Jaya citizens but it was rebranded as Petaling Jaya Dispersal Link Expressway and also the Bangi-Putrajaya Expressway.

=== George Town Conurbation ===
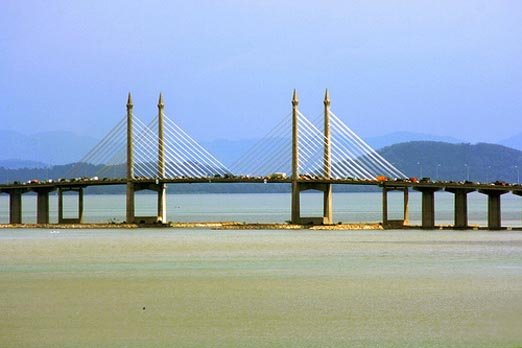
The Penang Bridge across the Penang Strait was the first expressway in Penang. The bridge was the longest bridge in Southeast Asia upon its completion in 1985.

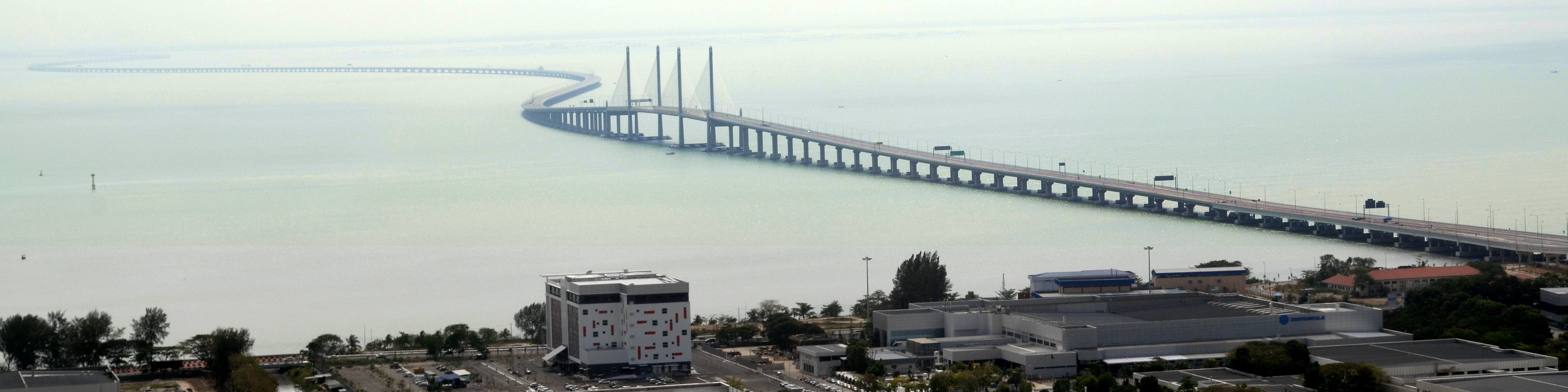
The Second Penang Bridge lies to the south of the Penang Bridge. With a total length of 24 kilometres (15 mi), it is currently the second longest bridge in Southeast Asia.

The history of highways in Penang began in the 1970s when the Malaysian federal government decided to build the Penang Bridge, connecting Seberang Perai and Penang Island. The construction of the Penang Bridge, between Perai on the mainland and Gelugor on Penang Island, began in 1982 and was completed in 1985. This bridge was officially opened on 14 September 1985 by the fourth Prime Minister, Mahathir Mohamad.

The main reasons for constructing new expressways in Penang are the increasing populations in George Town and Butterworth, and the need for more cross-strait linkages. Prior to the construction of the Penang Bridge, the only way to cross the Penang Strait between Penang Island and the mainland was via ferries. In addition, major industrial estates, such as in Bayan Lepas on the island and Perai on the mainland, were opened, leading to the growth of residential townships like Bayan Baru and Seberang Jaya. These necessitated the construction of more bridges and expressways in the state.

Since then, a number of other expressway projects within Penang, such as the Butterworth Outer Ring Road (BORR), the Butterworth–Seberang Jaya Toll Road and the Tun Dr Lim Chong Eu Expressway were completed. On densely populated Penang Island, the Gelugor Highway and the Penang Middle Ring Road were also created to alleviate traffic congestion.

The.Butterworth–Kulim Expressway (BKE) is a tolled expressway that connects Butterworth with the town of Kulim (and Kulim Hi-tech Park) in neighbouring Kedah. This interstate highway was built as industrialisation began to spread out from Seberang Perai towards southern Kedah in the 1980s, forming what is now the George Town Conurbation.

The Second Penang Bridge, officially named the Sultan Abdul Halim Muadzam Shah Bridge, was opened on 1 March 2014 by the Malaysian Prime Minister, Najib Tun Razak. This 24-kilometre-long (15 mi) bridge, linking Batu Maung on Penang Island and Batu Kawan in Seberang Perai, is currently the longest bridge in Southeast Asia.

=== Iskandar Malaysia and Johor Bahru ===
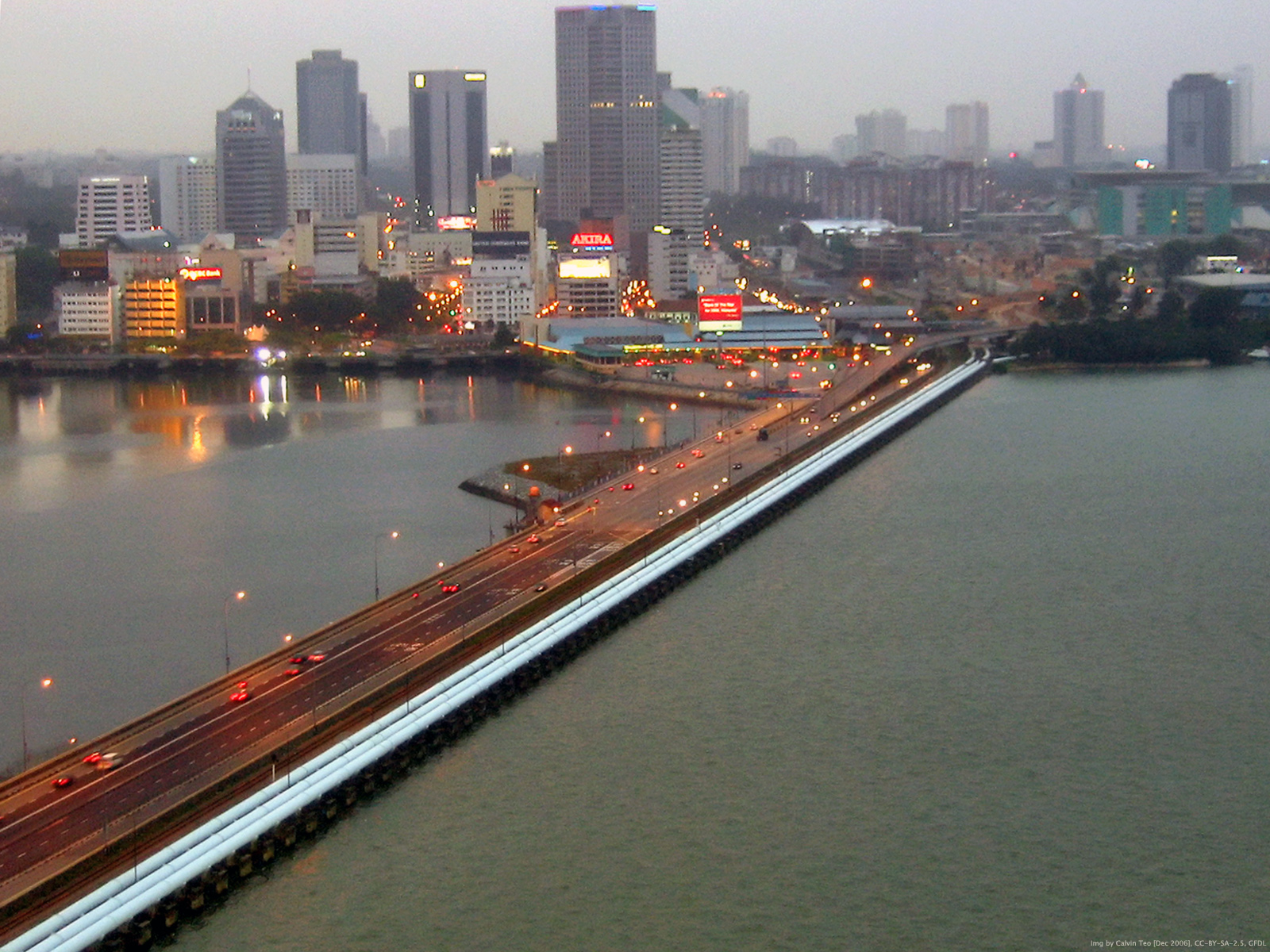
The Johor–Singapore Causeway serves as the primary connection of Johor Bahru with Woodlands, Singapore. Johor Bahru, the capital city of Johor, is visible in the background

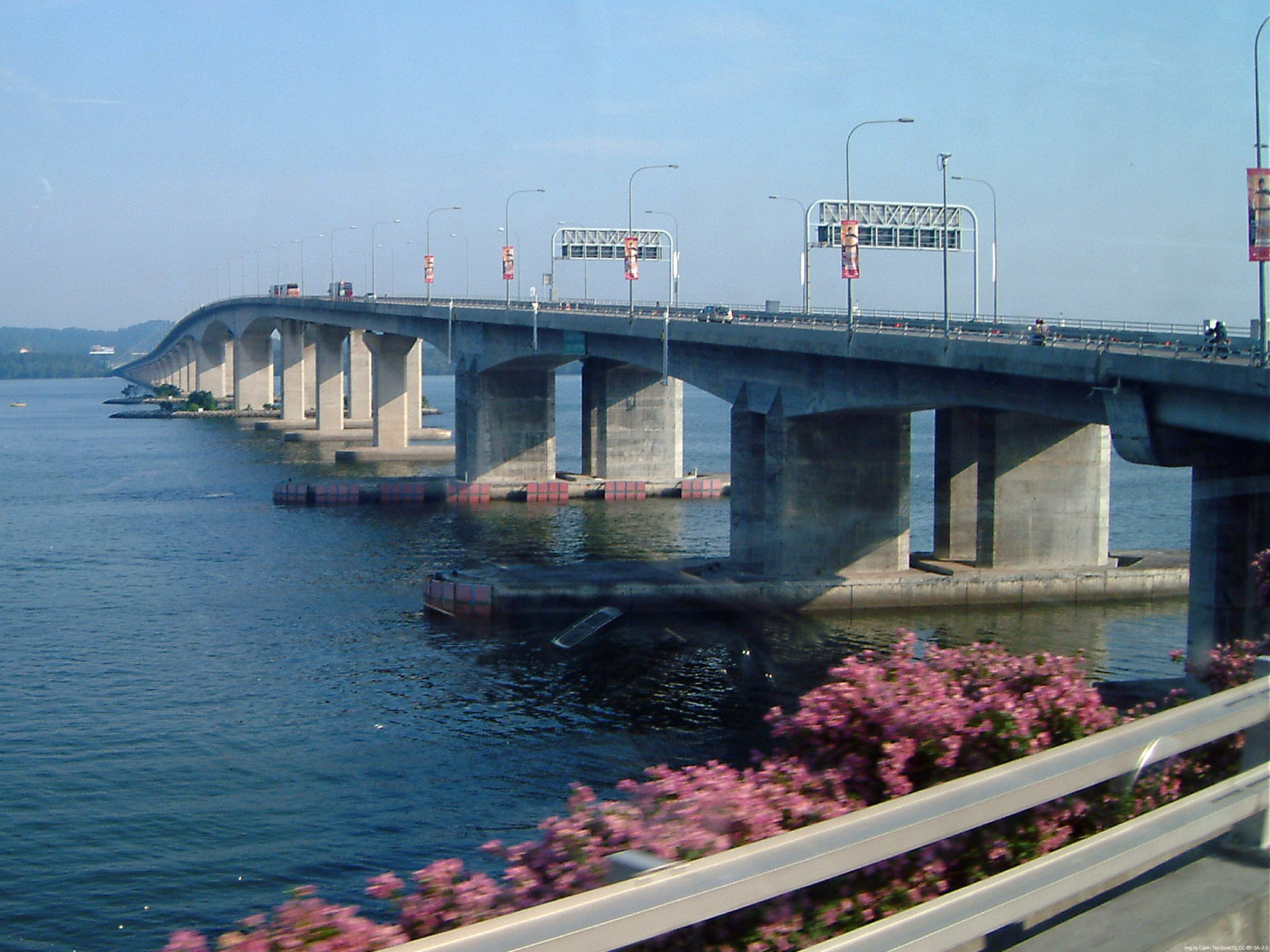
The Malaysia–Singapore Second Crossing serves as the secondary connection of Tanjung Kupang, Johor with Tuas, Singapore

The history of highways in Johor Bahru started in the 1980s when the city of Johor Bahru became a main southern international gateway to Malaysia from Singapore after the separation of Singapore from Malaysia on 9 August 1965.

The main reasons for building expressways in Johor Bahru are the increasing size of the Johor Bahru metropolitan area since it achieved city status on 1 January 1994, and the formation of the South Johor Economic Region (SJER) or Iskandar Development Region (IDR) (now Iskandar Malaysia) on 30 July 2006. Many townships have been constructed around Johor Bahru and industrial estates have been developed in areas such as Senai, Skudai, Tebrau, Pasir Gudang and Tampoi.

The first highway in Johor Bahru was Skudai Highway linking Senai to Johor Causeway, which was completed in 1985 and it was the first toll highway in Johor Bahru. However the toll plaza near Senai was abolished in 2004. Kempas Highway, the only state road in Malaysia constructed as a 2-lane highway was completed in 1994. The Malaysia–Singapore Second Crossing, which is the second link to Singapore after Johor Causeway, was opened to traffic on 18 April 1998.

Other expressway projects in Johor Bahru are Senai–Desaru Expressway (SDE) linking Senai in the west to Desaru in east coast of Johor, the Johor Bahru Eastern Dispersal Link Expressway (EDL) which linking Pandan interchange of the North–South Expressway to the new Sultan Iskandar CIQ Building in city centre, the Iskandar Coastal Highway linking Nusajaya in the west to the city centre in the east and the Johor Bahru East Coast Highway linking Kampung Bakar Batu passing through Permas Jaya, Taman Rinting and finally towards Pasir Gudang.

In addition to Johor Bahru Inner Ring Road (JBIRR) as the inner ring road in Johor Bahru, Pasir Gudang Highway, Second Link Expressway and Johor Bahru Parkway also act as middle ring roads of the city. Second Link Expressway and the Senai–Desaru Expressway may form the outer ring roads of Johor Bahru.

=== East Malaysia ===
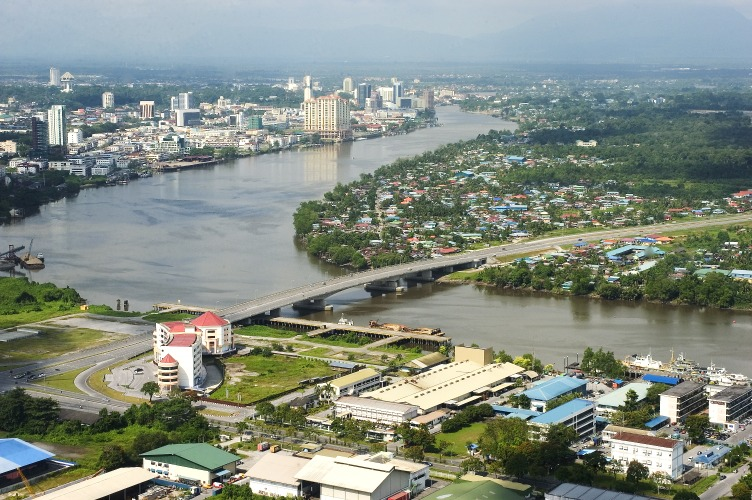
Tun Salahuddin Bridge, the only tolled expressway in East Malaysia. In the background is Kuching City Centre

The history of highways in East Malaysia started in the 1960s when the federal government decided to build the Pan Borneo Highway, linking Sarawak and Sabah state.

The Pan Borneo Highway project is a joint project between the governments of Brunei and Malaysia. The project started as soon as Sarawak and Sabah joined the federation of Malaysia in 1963. The lack of a road network system in Sarawak was the main factor of the construction.

There are one toll expressway, one toll federal highway and one toll state highway in Sarawak – the Tun Salahuddin Bridge in Kuching city, the Miri–Baram Highway in Miri Division, and the Lanang Bridge in Sibu. The Tun Salahuddin Bridge is the first only toll expressway in East Malaysia. However, the toll collection of both Lanang Bridge and Tun Salahuddin Bridge were abolished in 2015 and 2016 by the Sarawak state government.

On 31 March 2015, the dual carriageway toll free Pan Borneo Expressway in Sarawak was unveiled by the Federal Government. The highway project will be implemented with Lebuhraya Borneo Utara Sdn Bhd (LBU) as the Project Delivery Partner (PDP) managing and supervising its construction.

== Features ==
=== Expressway standards ===
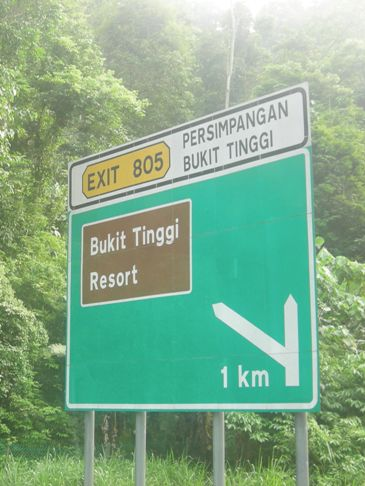
Malaysian expressway exit signs

The construction, standards, management and usage of expressways in Malaysia are subject to Federal Roads Act (Private Management) 1984. In Malaysia, expressways are defined as high-speed routes with at least four lanes (two in each direction) and should have full access control or partial access control. Most expressways in Malaysia are controlled-access expressways.

Expressways are defined as high-speed highways built under the JKR R6 rural highway standard, as dual-carriageways of at least 4 lanes (2 lanes per carriageway) with full access control, grade-separated interchanges and high design speed limit of 120 kilometres per hour (75 mph), allowing the maximum speed limit of 110 kilometres per hour (68 mph). However, the section between Cahaya Baru and Penawar of the Senai–Desaru Expressway E22 is built as a two-lane single carriageway with the similar features as the Swiss autostrasse, making it as the first true two-lane controlled-access expressway in Malaysia followed by the section of Teluk Panglima Garang and Pulau Indah of the South Klang Valley Expressway (SKVE) E26 All expressways are considered federal highways, but administered by Malaysian Highway Authority (MHA) and the respective concessionaire companies.

Highways, on the other hand, complement the national network of expressways and federal roads and built under the JKR R5 rural highway standard, with relatively high design speed limit (although not as high as the expressway speed limit) of 100 kilometres per hour (62 mph), allowing the maximum speed limit of 90 kilometres per hour (56 mph). The highways are built with partial access control, and grade-separated interchanges and at-grade crossings are both permitted. However, it is possible for a federal or state highway to be built with almost equivalent standard of an expressway with the exception of lower speed limit, for example the Federal Highway. Highways can be built either as dual-carriageway or two-lane single carriageway.

Before the mid-1990s, there were no specific coding system for the expressways. When more and more expressways were built, a system of expressway numbering was applied to all expressways. Expressways are labelled with the letter "E" followed by assigned numbers, for example the code for North–South Expressway southern route is E2. The expressways have green signs and the text colour is white.

However, there are some exceptions in some highways. Some highways like Federal Highway (Federal Route 2) and Skudai Highway (Federal Route 1) retain their federal route codes. In addition, there are some highways in Malaysia which are classified as municipal roads such as Kuala Lumpur Middle Ring Road 1.

The highway exit numbers use the format "xxnn", where "xx" is the expressway code number (which can be one or two digits) and "nn" is the two-digit assigned number for each highway exit. For example, Johor Bahru exit at the end of North–South Expressway is labelled exit 257, where the last two digits (57) are the assigned exit number and the first digit (2) is the expressway route number (E2). Meanwhile, Jalan Templer exit at the Federal Highway is labelled exit 224, where the two digits (24) are the assigned exit number and the first digit (2) is the federal route number (2). Expressways have distance markers in green colour (blue for federal expressways and highways) placed every 100 metres (330 ft; 110 yd).

=== Route number categories ===
==== Expressway route numbers ====
| Examples | Information | Number digits |
|---|---|---|
| North–South Expressway Southern Route; SMART Tunnel | Expressway route numbers | E01–E99 |
| 253; 123 | Expressway exit numbers | EXIT 201–EXIT 299; EXIT 100–199 |

==== Federal route numbers ====
| Examples | Information | Number digits |
|---|---|---|
| FT 2 FT 30; FT 347 | Main federal route numbers | 001–1999 |
| 1; 201 | Federal road exit numbers | 001–999 |

=== Pavements ===
Most expressways are paved with typical tarmac, which is a mixture of fine stone chips and tar; however, some expressways are paved with concrete such as North–South Expressway Northern Route (from Bukit Lanjan Interchange, Selangor to Tapah interchange, Perak), New Klang Valley Expressway, North–South Expressway Southern Route (from Ayer Keroh interchange, Melaka to Tangkak interchange, Johor), SMART Tunnel and Skudai–Pontian Highway (from Universiti Teknologi Malaysia interchange to Taman Sri Pulai junction). Meanwhile, at Federal Highway linking Klang to Kuala Lumpur, the section of the expressway from Subang Jaya to Kota Darul Ehsan near Petaling Jaya is paved with asphalt.

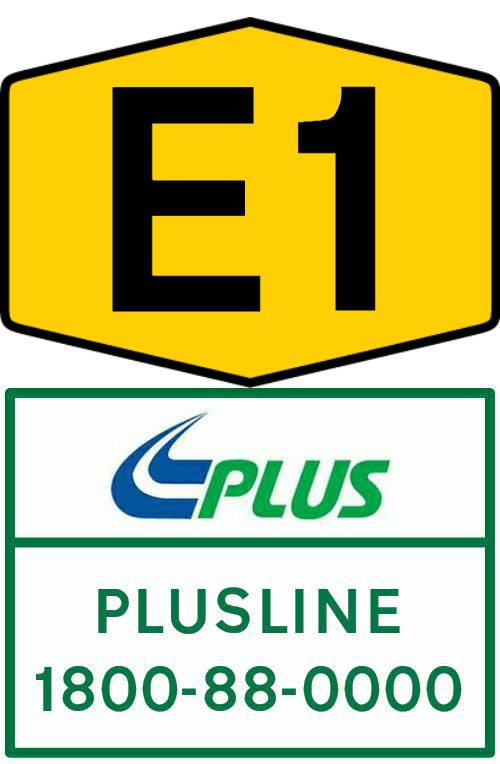
Malaysian expressway code logo with highway concessionaries logo and SOS hotline

== Expressway monitoring and maintenance ==
=== Monitoring ===
Since 1986, Malaysian expressways have been built by private companies under the supervision of the government highway authority, Lembaga Lebuhraya Malaysia (Malaysian Highway Authority). Every private concession company, such as PLUS Expressways, ANIH Berhad (formerly MTD Prime) and the others have monitored and maintained their expressways.

=== Maintenance ===
Projek Penyelenggaraan Lebuhraya Berhad (PROPEL) has undertaken repair and maintenance works on highway facilities, such as road works and repair works, road line painting, cleaning works on laybys and rest and service areas, trimming grass and landscaping along expressway areas, installing road furniture, and others. Meanwhile, the PROPEL Response Team Unit is a special response team unit.

The Karak Expressway and East Coast Expressway are maintained by Alloy Consolidated Sdn Bhd.

=== Traffic management ===
Since late 2006, every expressway in Malaysia has been monitored by the Malaysian Highway Authority (LLM) Traffic Management Centre (LLM TMC). However, in some parts of Klang Valley, the expressways are monitored by the Integrated Transport Information System (ITIS); expressways in George Town, Penang are monitored by the Penang Island City Council.

Malaysian Highway Authority traffic information page

== Toll system ==
=== Types of toll systems ===
Every expressway and highway in Malaysia has a toll system, which is either a closed toll system or open toll system. All transactions are in Malaysian Ringgit (RM)

==== Open system ====
Users only have to pay at certain toll plazas within the open system range for a fixed amount.

==== Closed system ====
Users collect toll tickets or touch in with their Touch 'n Go card North South Expressway issues the PLUSTransit cards and other closed toll expressways such as East Coast Expressway and South Klang Valley Expressway issues the transit card) before entering the expressway at respective toll plazas and pay an amount of toll or touch out with your same touch n go card at the exit toll plaza plus the distance from the plaza to the Limit of Maintenance Responsibility (LMR). The toll rate in this system is based on the distance traveled.

=== Electronic toll collection ===
There are three types of the electronic toll collection (ETC) systems, Touch 'n Go card unit, Smart TAG on board unit, MyRFID tag and contactless credit/debit cards. Touch 'n Go and Smart TAG, have been made compulsory in all expressways since 1 July 2004, following the instruction of the Works Minister, Datuk Seri S. Samy Vellu. Other electronic payment systems that were previously used by other highway operators such as PLUS TAG for all PLUS expressways network, Express TAG for Shah Alam Expressway, FasTrak for Damansara–Puchong Expressway and Sprint Expressway and SagaTag in Cheras–Kajang Expressway, were abolished in a move to standardise the electronic payment method. Toll payments by contactless payment debit and credit cards using the MyDebit, Visa and Mastercard network debuted in Maju Expressway since 3 August 2023.

| | Other expressway concessionaries | | PLUS Expressways | | | |
| Electronic toll collection systems vs Payment method | Touch 'n Go SmartTAG | Touch 'n Go | Touch 'n Go SmartTAG | Touch 'n Go | | PLUS RFiD |
| Electronic toll collection systems vs Payment method | Touch 'n Go SmartTAG | MyRFiD | Touch 'n Go SmartTAG | MyRFiD | VEP RFiD | PLUS RFiD |
| Touch 'n Go Card: Generic Card; Corporate Card; Zing Card | ✔ | | ✔ | | | |
| Touch 'n Go eWallet | ✔Toll fare will be deducted from eWallet balance via PayDirect | ✔ | XPayDirect not activated | ✔ | •VEP enforcement deferred until further notice | •will be extended to open and closed system nationwide after fully launch |
| Bank Card (Debit/Credit) | | | | | | ✔under pilot test on open system |
| Notes | Nationwide toll collection on open and closed system For PayDirect, if your eWallet are insufficient, your toll fares will be deducted from your Touch 'n Go Card balance. | RFID tag issuance by Touch 'n Go for Malaysian registered vehicle. | Nationwide toll collection on open and closed system | Nationwide toll collection on open and closed system | RFID tag issuance by Touch 'n Go for foreign registered vehicle currently available at Johor checkpoints. | RFID tag issuance by PLUS Expressways. |

=== Multi Lane Free Flow ===
The Multi Lane Free Flow (MLFF) is an electronic toll collection system that allows free flow high speed toll system highway for all its users. With MLFF, the current toll lanes at toll plazas will be replaced with readers at gantry across the highway to detect vehicle and deduct toll using the existing ETC when fully implemented. The Malaysian Highway Authority (MHA) is planning to implement MLFF system at all highways in stages starting 2010.

=== Toll rebate ===
Beginning 1 September 2009, the 20 per cent rebate given to motorists who pay toll charges more than 80 times a month, can be saved for up to six months. The rebate can be redeemed at 126 locations which would be announced in due time.

=== Toll rate classes ===
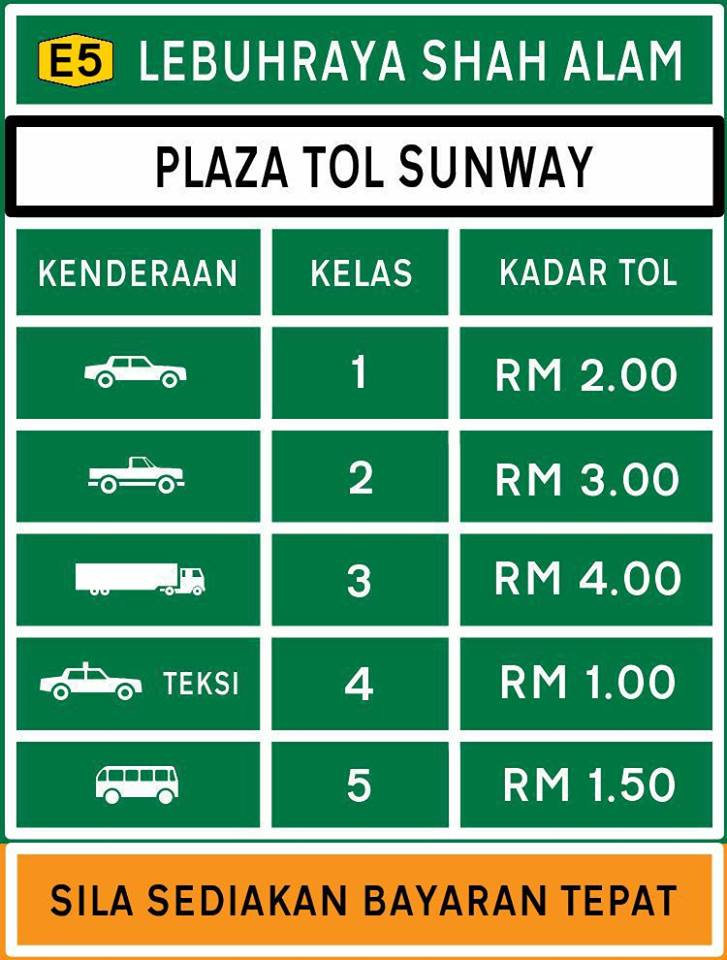
Malaysian expressway toll rate list signboard

There are fixed toll rate classes for every Malaysian expressway except for the Penang Bridge and the SMART Tunnel where toll rates are not the same.

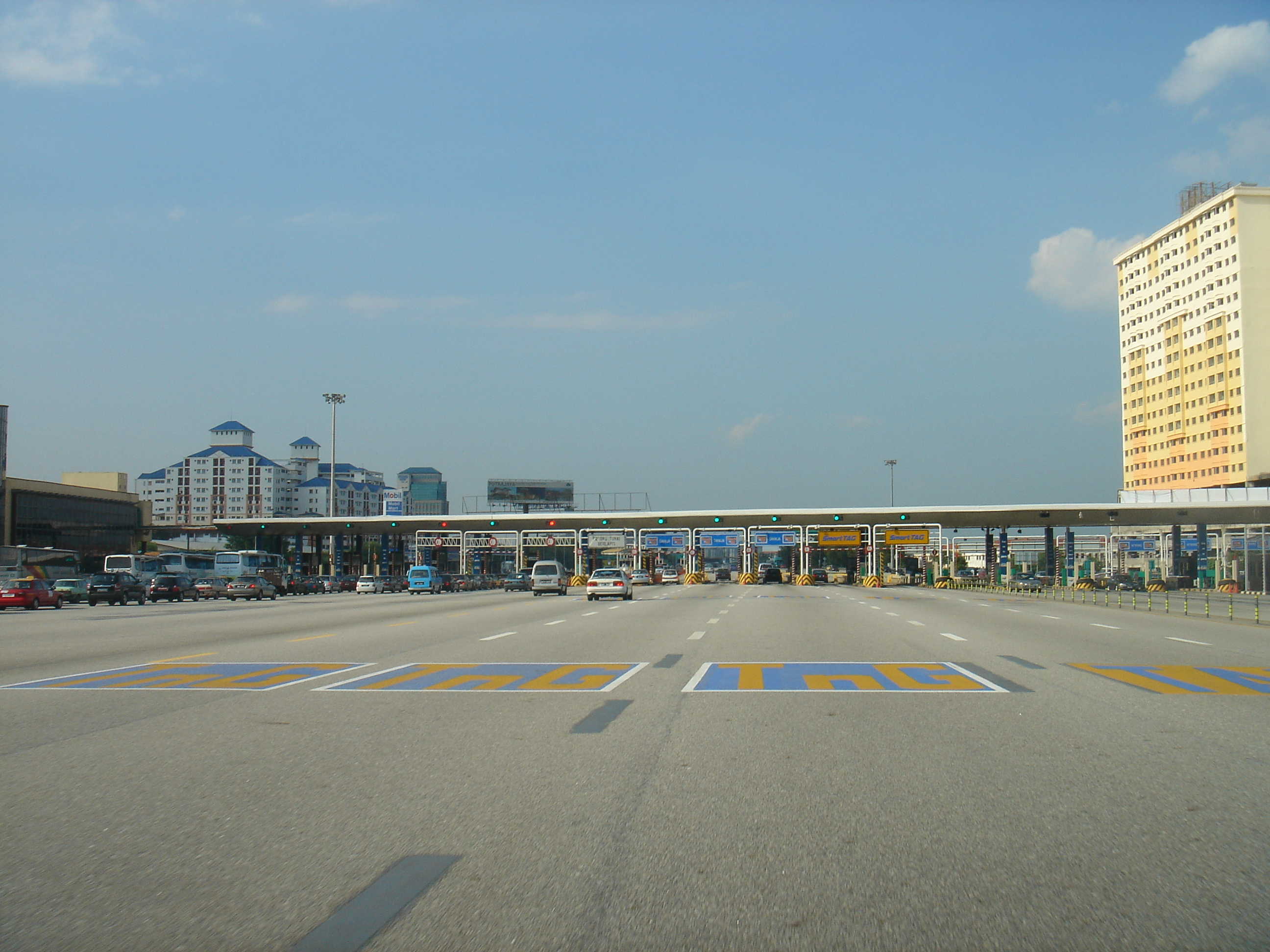
Sungai Besi Toll Plaza on North–South Expressway in Kuala Lumpur

==== Expressways ====
These classes apply to every expressway in Malaysia (including Johor–Singapore Causeway, Malaysia–Singapore Second Link and Sultan Abdul Halim Muadzam Shah Bridge):

| Class | Type of vehicles | Payment | Notes |
|---|---|---|---|
| 0 | Motorcycles (Vehicles with two axles and two wheels) | Free | Except: Tanjung Kupang Toll Plaza (Malaysia–Singapore Second Link) and Perai Toll Plaza (Penang Bridge); Touch 'n Go Bandar Cassia-JKSB Toll Plaza (Sultan Abdul Halim Muadzam Shah Bridge); Touch 'n Go; All toll free on 1 January 2019 |
| 1 | Private Cars (Vehicles with two axles and three or four wheels (excluding taxi and bus)) | Touch 'n Go SmartTAG MyRFID | |
| 2 | Vans and other small good vehicles (Vehicles with two axles and six wheels (excluding bus)) | Touch 'n Go SmartTAG MyRFID | |
| 3 | Large Trucks (Vehicles with three or more axles (excluding bus)) | Touch 'n Go | |
| 4 | Taxis | Touch 'n Go | Cash only, paid by passengers only. |
| 5 | Buses | Touch 'n Go | Note: RapidKL buses using Touch 'n Go and SmartTAG for Bus Expressway Transit (BET) at all toll plazas in the Klang Valley. |

==== Penang Bridge ====
| Class | Type of vehicles | Payment | Notes |
|---|---|---|---|
| 1 | Motorcycles, bicycles or vehicles with 2 or less wheels | Touch 'n Go | Toll Free on 1 January 2019 |
| 2 | Motorcycle with sidecars, cars including station wagon and commercial vehicles on three wheels | Touch 'n Go SmartTAG | For taxis, toll charges are paid by passengers using Touch 'n Go only. |
| 3 | Lorries, vans and buses with two axles and four wheels | Touch 'n Go SmartTAG | |
| 4 | Lorries, vans and buses with two axles and five and six wheels | Touch 'n Go | |
| 5 | Vehicles with three axles | Touch 'n Go | |
| 6 | Vehicles with four axles | Touch 'n Go | |
| 7 | Vehicles with five or more axles | Touch 'n Go | |

==== SMART Tunnel ====
| Class | Type of vehicles | Payment | Notes |
|---|---|---|---|
| 1 | Private Cars (Vehicles with two axles and three or four wheels (excluding taxis)) | Touch 'n Go SmartTAG | |
| 4 | Taxis | Touch 'n Go SmartTAG | Toll charges are paid by passengers using Touch 'n Go only. |

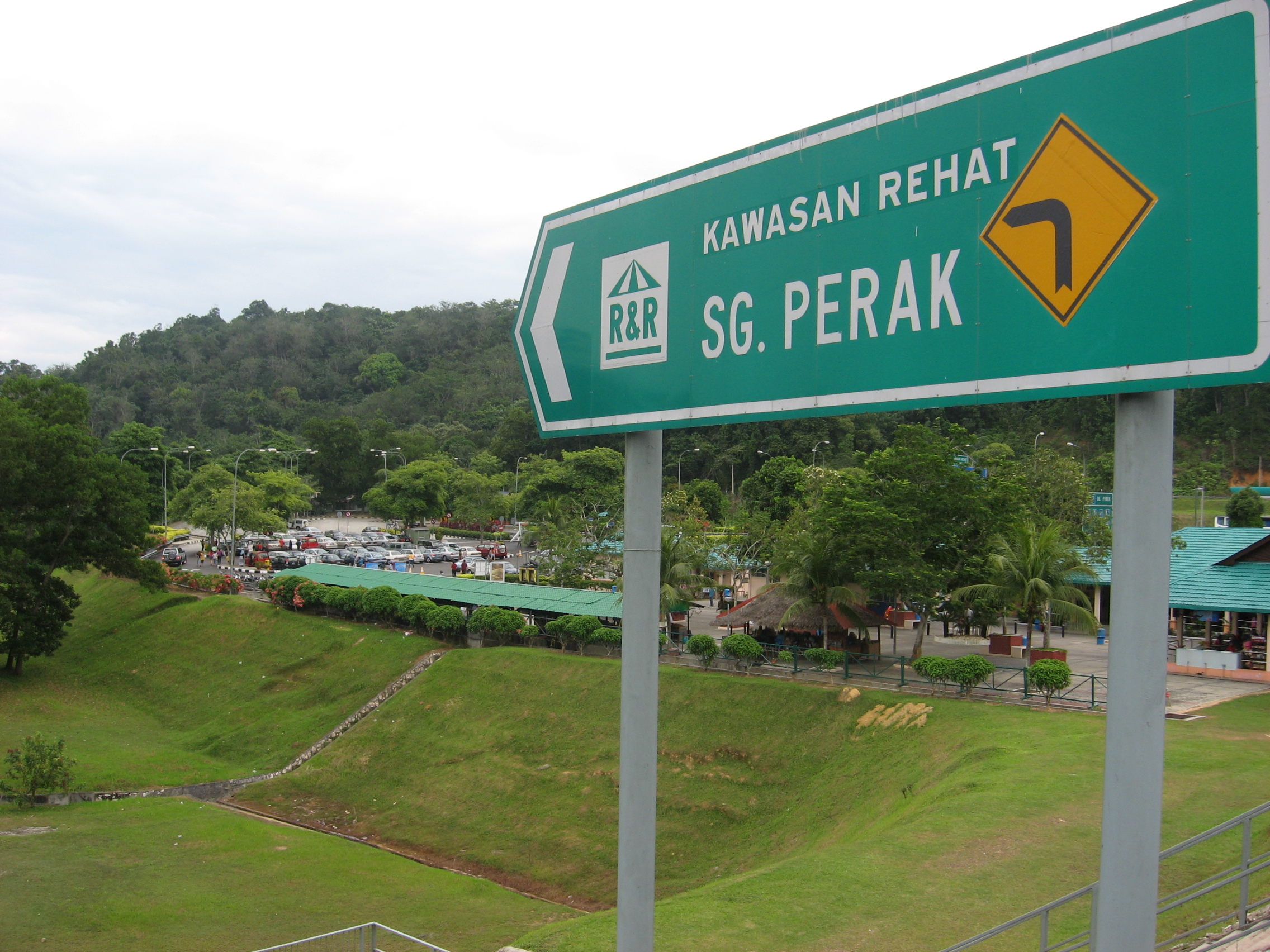
The Sungai Perak Rest and Service Area, Perak of the North–South Expressway Northern Route

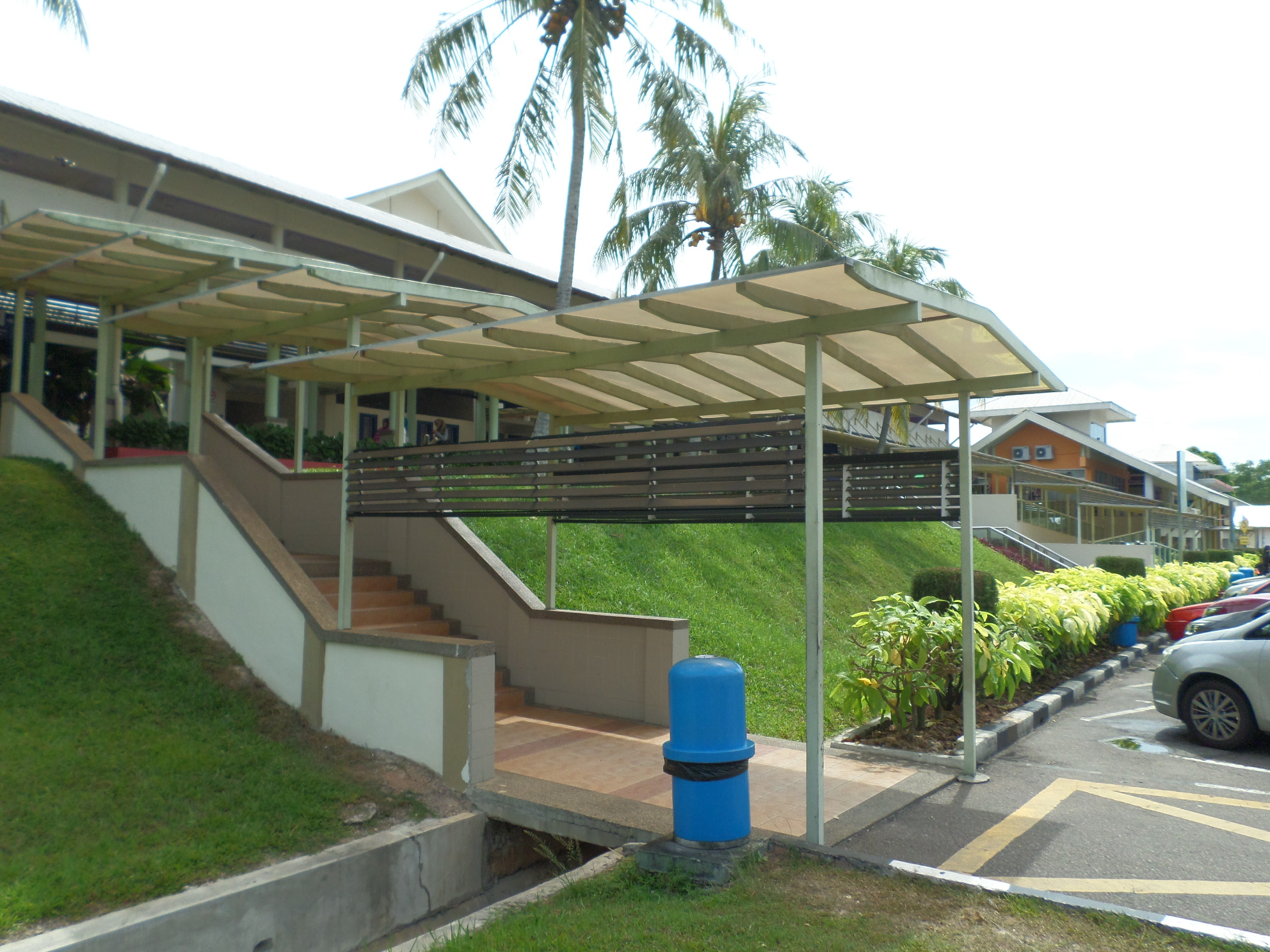
The Machap Rest and Service Area, Johor of the North–South Expressway Southern Route

== Controversial issues ==
There are several controversial issues regarding the construction of expressways. The main issue is the increase of toll rates, which can be a huge burden especially for residents of Kuala Lumpur and the surrounding Klang Valley conurbation.

There are also various parties who question the capability of the numerous expressways in Klang Valley to overcome traffic congestion, which does not show signs of improvement with the construction of new expressways. Three chief factors were blamed for the urban expressway congestion, namely the short-sighted policies by the authorities, greedy property developers, and the failure of local municipal councils to control the development in the Klang Valley.

There are also several protests being held by residents of some housing areas being affected by several planned expressways, such as the Sungai Besi–Ulu Klang Elevated Expressway (SUKE), Damansara–Shah Alam Elevated Expressway (DASH) and Kinrara–Damansara Expressway (KIDEX Skyway) (project scrapped in 2014). Environmental issues such as road noise and worsening congestion became the chief reasons of those protests.

Other controversial issues include the following:

1. The cracks found on beams on the Kepong Flyover in Kuala Lumpur Middle Ring Road 2 (MRR2) on 10 August 2004.
2. The flyover which collapsed on Setia Alam Interchange in New Klang Valley Expressway during construction on 10 July 2005, where about 4 people died.
3. The 8 fallen I-beams at the Pajam Interchange in Negeri Sembilan during the construction of the Kajang–Seremban Highway (LEKAS Highway) on the night of 27 September 2007.
4. The ramp collapse at the Batu Maung Interchange at Batu Maung side of the Penang Second Bridge during construction on 6 June 2013 killing one person.

== Gallery ==
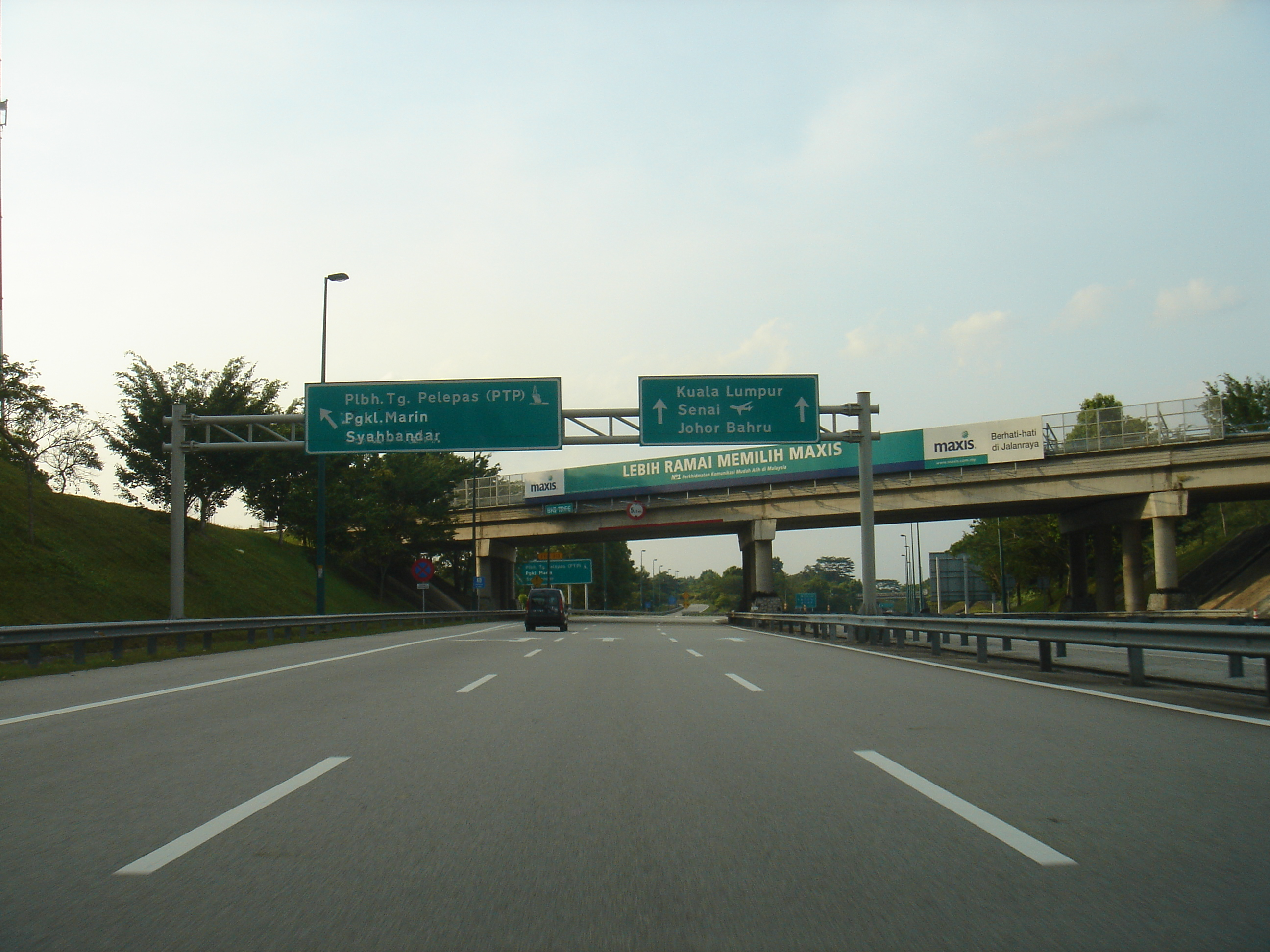
Linkedua Expressway in Malaysia after the Singapore–Malaysia Second Link Bridge, in the northbound direction.

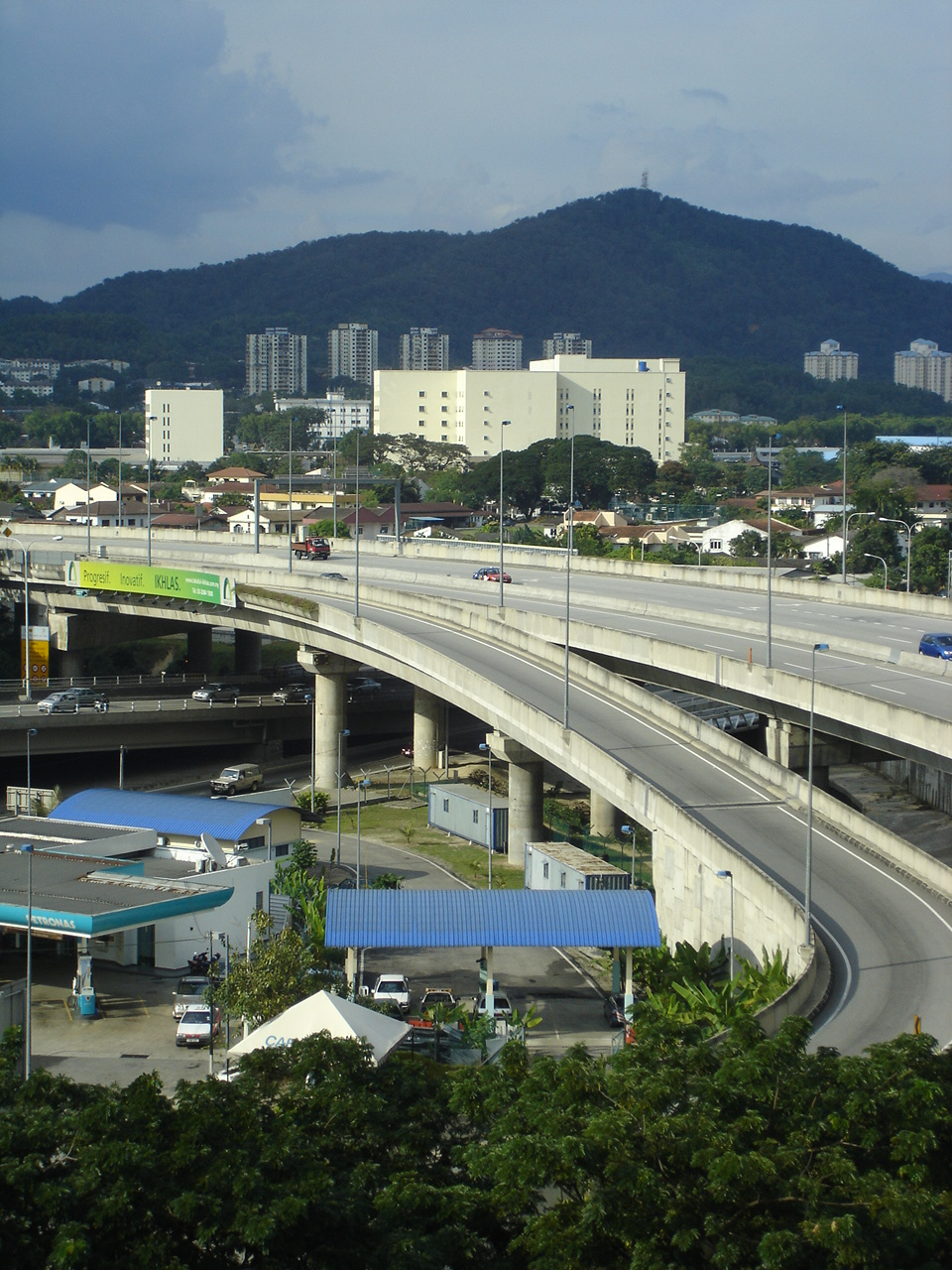
The Ampang–Kuala Lumpur Elevated Highway's interchange with Kuala Lumpur Middle Ring Road 2 in Ampang.

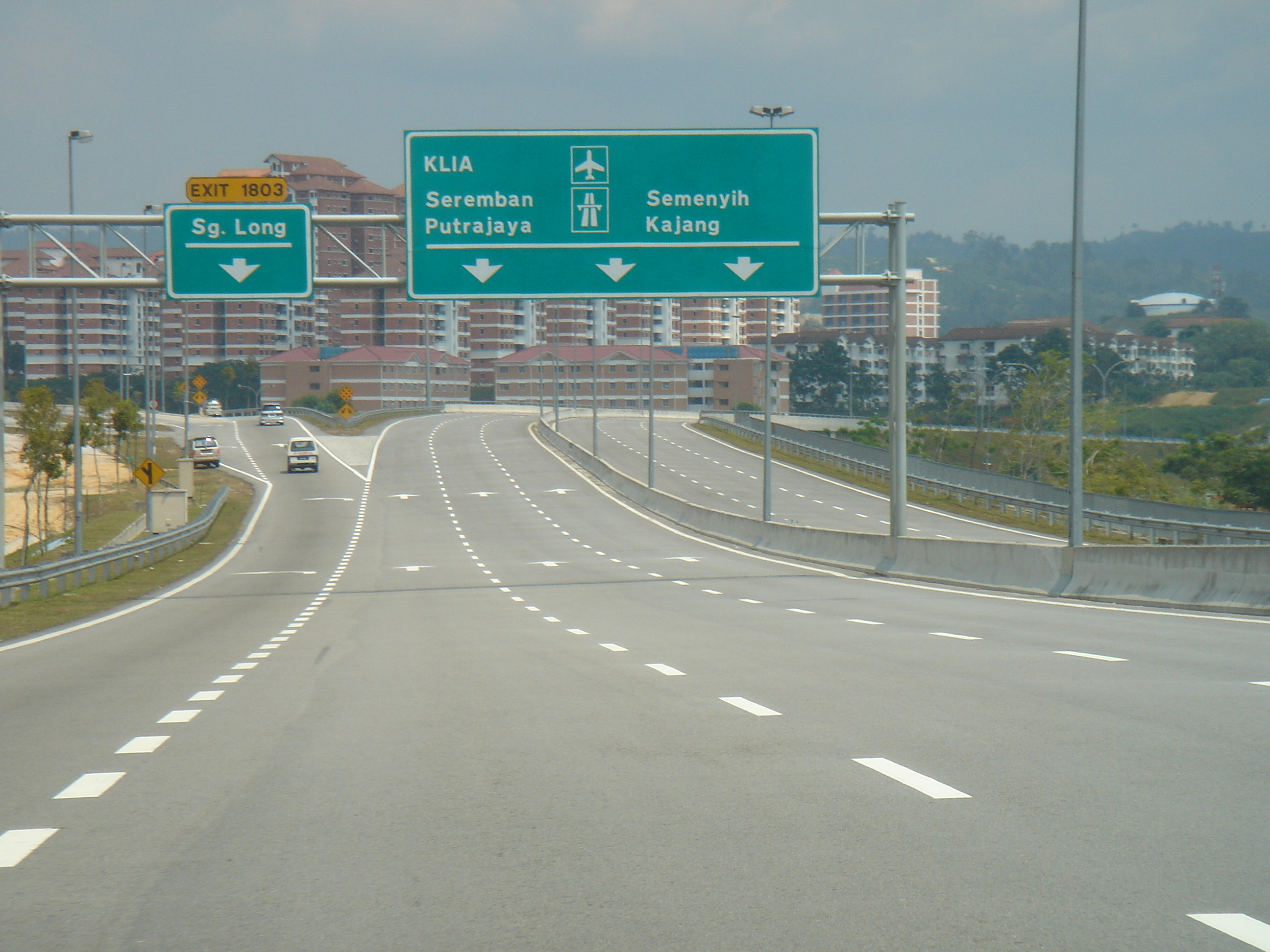
Newer expressways are relatively empty, such as Kajang Dispersal Link Expressway near Bandar Sungai Long, Kajang, Selangor.

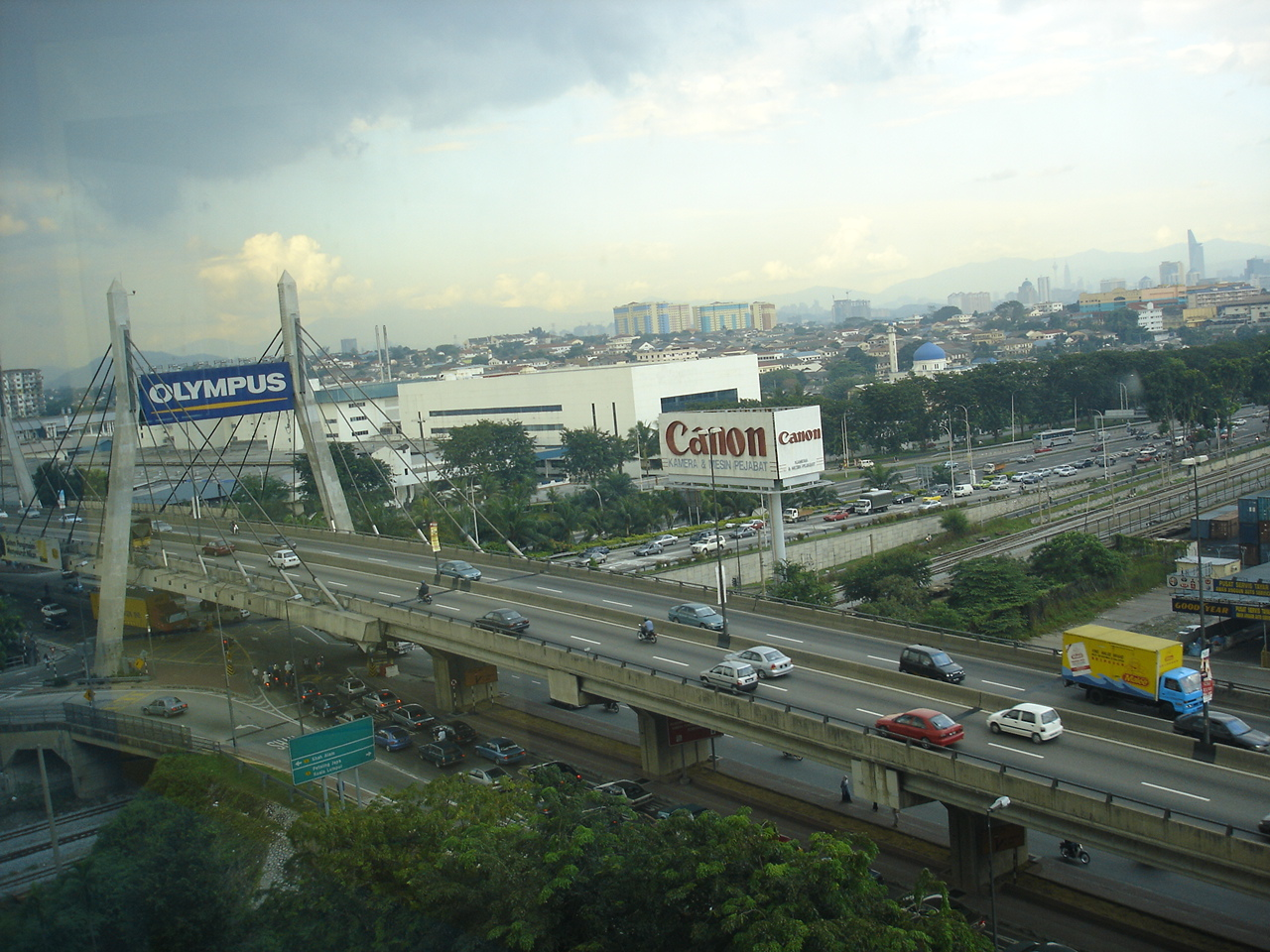
The cable bridge of Damansara–Puchong Expressway spanning over its intersection with Federal Highway in Petaling Jaya. Kuala Lumpur can be seen in the distant background on the right corner of the picture.

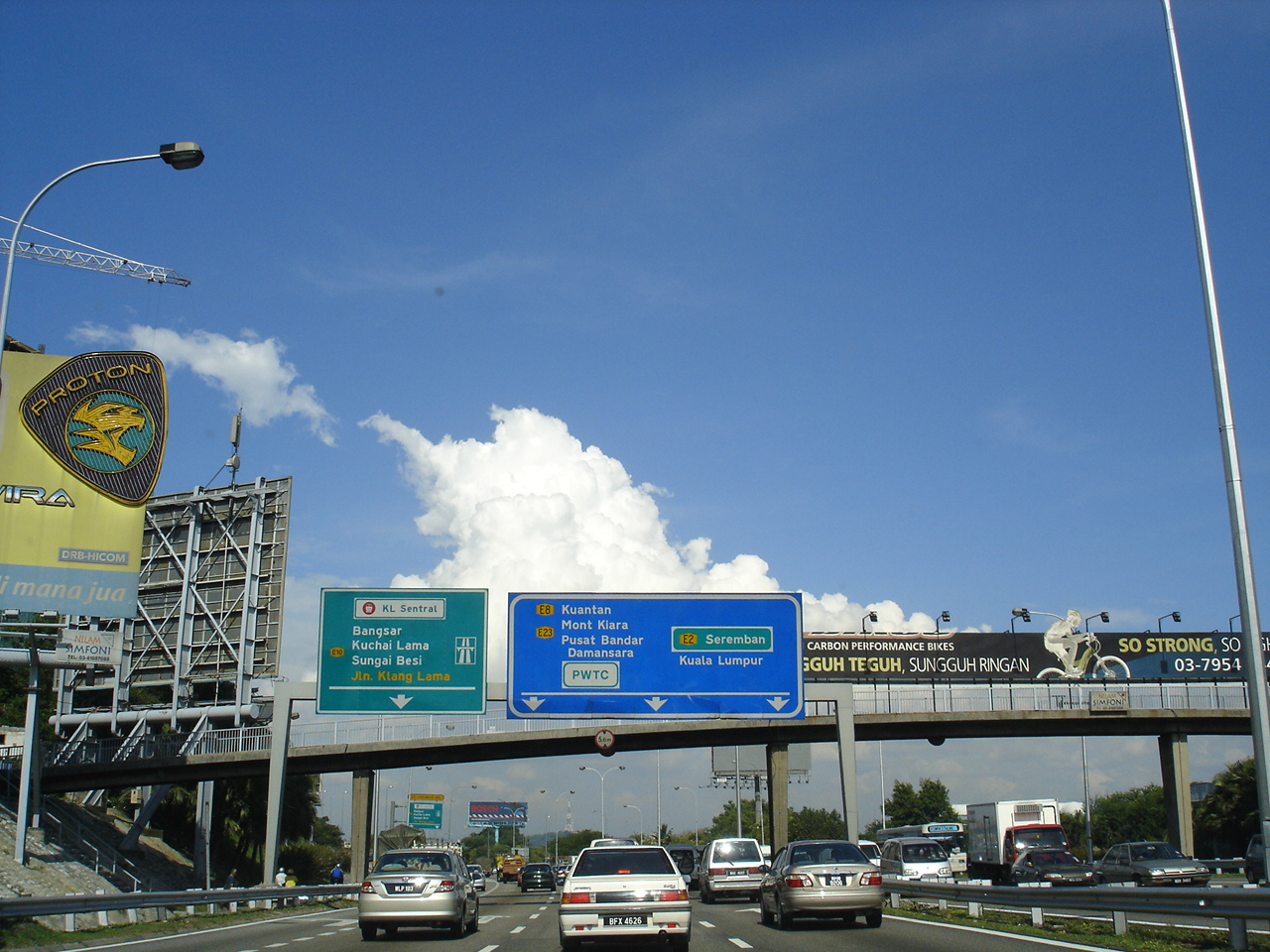
The Petaling Jaya stretch of the Federal Highway leading towards Kuala Lumpur.

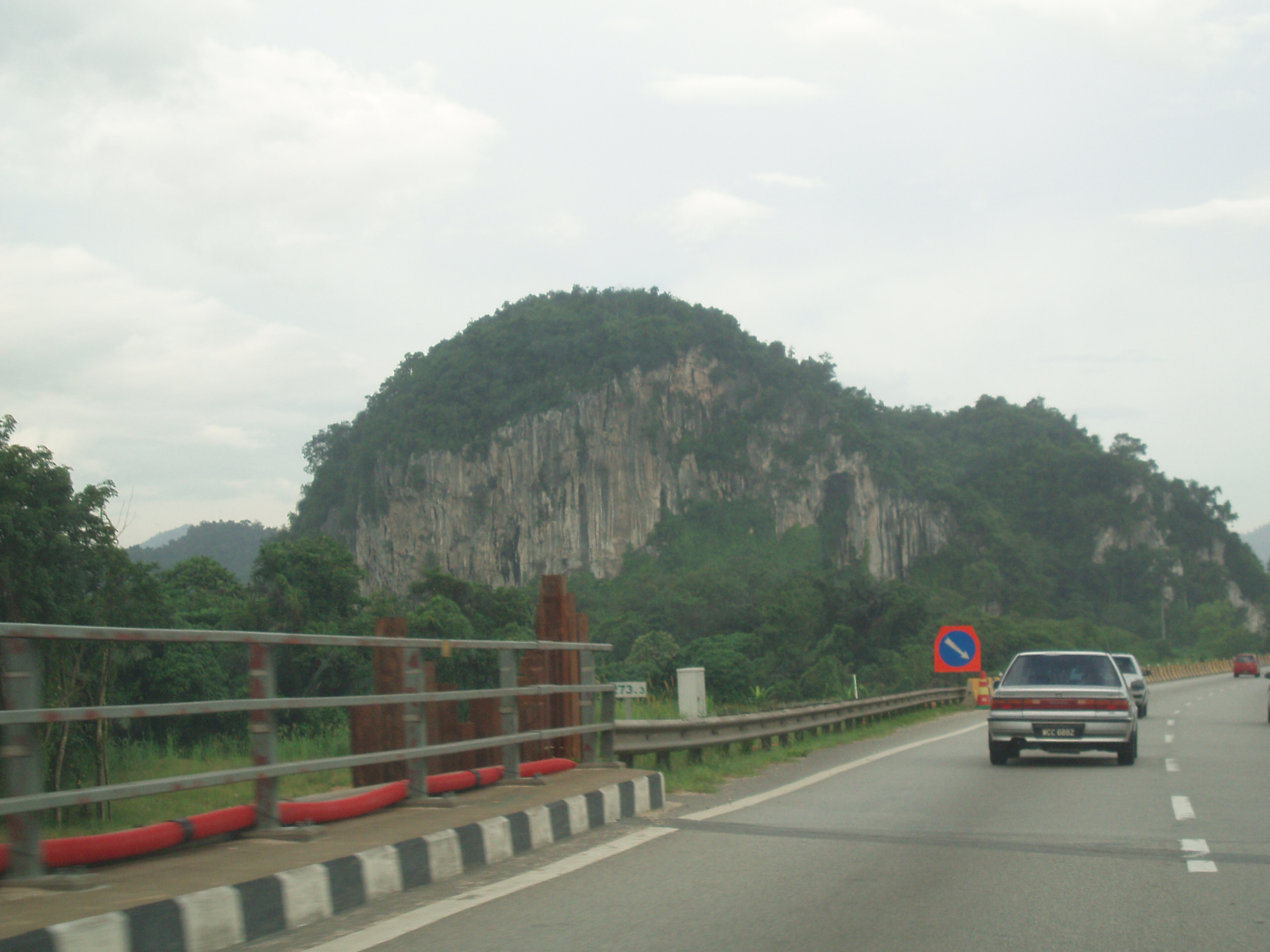
Along North–South Expressway Northern Route near Ipoh, Perak.

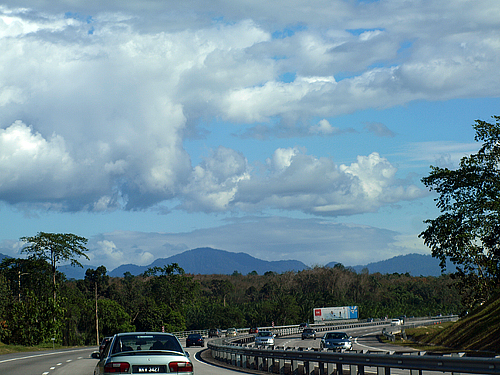
The Titiwangsa Range from the North–South Expressway Northern Route near Slim River.

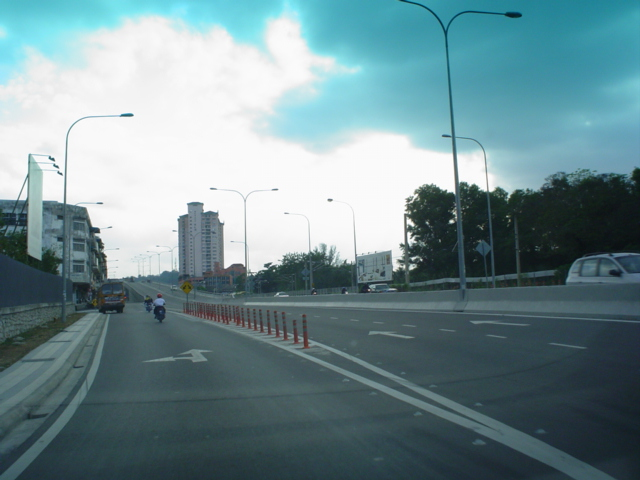
Sentul Link towards Mahameru Highway (MRR1)

== See also ==
- Road signs in Malaysia
- National Speed Limits
- Malaysian Federal Roads system
- Malaysian Highway Authority
- Malaysian State Roads system
- Multi Lane Free Flow
- Electronic Toll Collection
- Teras Teknologi (TERAS)
- Controlled-access highway
- Interstate Highway System
- Asian Highway Network
