= Petaling Jaya Dispersal Link Expressway =

Road in Malaysia

Route information
- Maintained by PJDLINK Sdn Bhd
- Length: 14.9 km (9.3 mi)
- Existed: 2011–present
- History: Cancelled, never been built

Major junctions
- North end: Damansara-NKVE Interchange; North–South Expressway Northern Route New Klang Valley Expressway
- North–South Expressway Northern Route New Klang Valley Expressway; Sprint Expressway Sprint Expressway = Damansara Link; New Pantai Expressway New Pantai Expressway; Shah Alam Expressway Shah Alam Expressway; FT 217 Bukit Jalil Highway; Bangi-Putrajaya Expressway
- South end: Bandar Kinrara

Location
- Country: Malaysia
- Primary destinations: Petaling Jaya

Highway system
- Highways in Malaysia; Expressways; Federal; State

The Petaling Jaya Dispersal Link Expressway (PJD Link) (formerly Kinrara–Damansara Expressway (KIDEX) or KIDEX Skyway) was a new expressway under planning in the Klang Valley, Malaysia. The 14.9-kilometre (9.3 mi) expressway was proposed to connect the Damansara–NKVE Interchange of the New Klang Valley Expressway in the north to Bandar Kinrara in the south. Proponents claimed the expressway would reduce travelling time between Damansara and Kinrara by approximately 25%, and lower traffic volume by 5% in both directions from Puchong to Petaling Jaya.

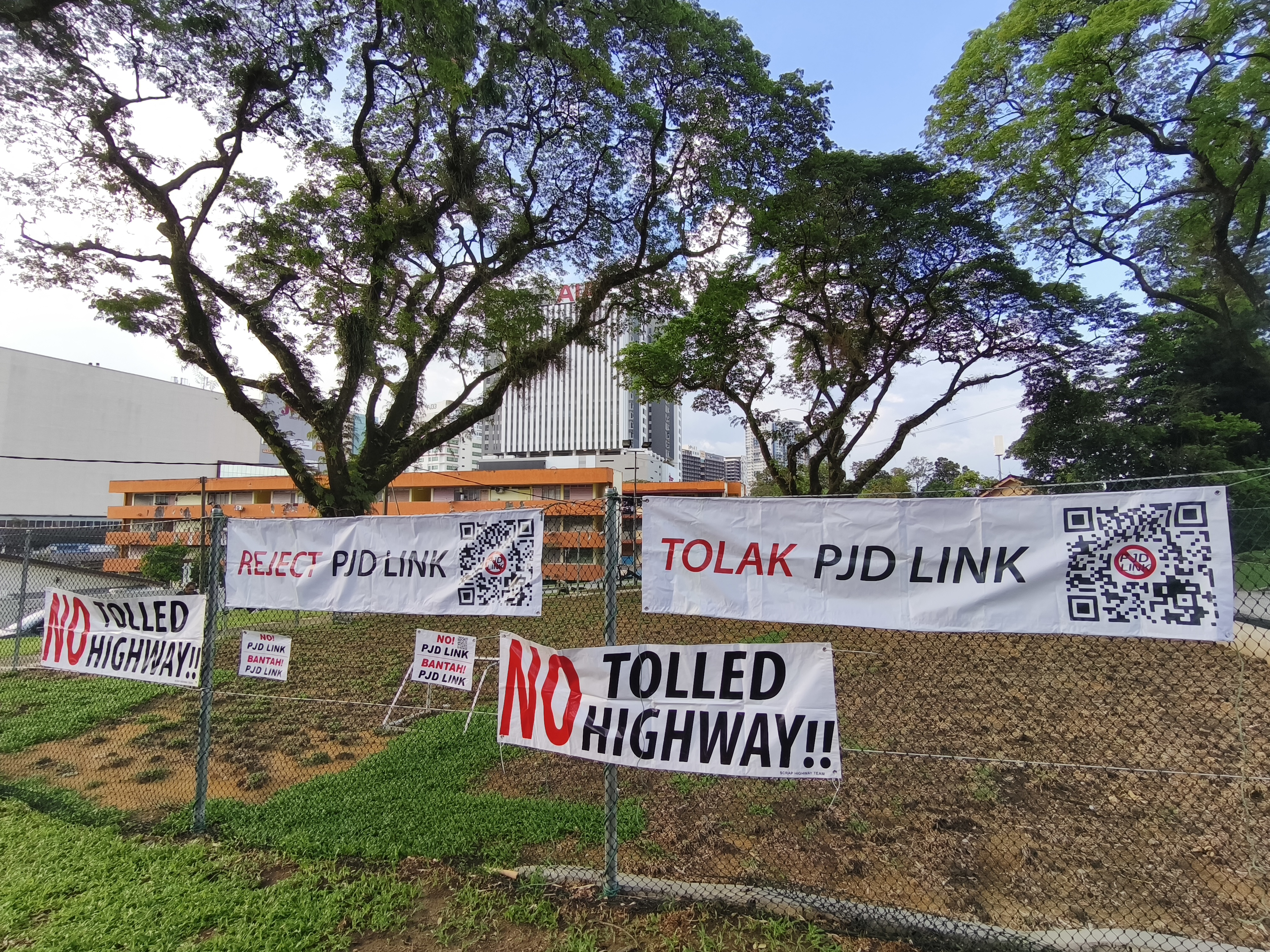
Banners with slogans "REJECT PJD LINK", "TOLAK PJD LINK", and "NO TOLLED HIGHWAY!!" displayed publicly on a perimeter fence in Section 14, Petaling Jaya, expressing community opposition.

Throughout its planning phases, the project faced notable opposition from local residents and community groups, who raised concerns regarding its potential environmental impact, noise pollution, and visual encroachment on established residential areas and landmarks. On 16 February 2015, following sustained public protests, the KIDEX Skyway project was cancelled by the Selangor State Government. In 2018, the project was revived under its current name, the Petaling Jaya Dispersal Link Expressway. In 2023, the Malaysian Anti-Corruption Commission (MACC) initiated an investigation into the submission of the project's Social Impact Assessment (SIA). The Malaysian federal government subsequently announced the cancellation of the project in 2024 due to the concessionaire's failure to meet the required conditions before the designated deadline.

== Route ==
The expressway was planned to start near the Damansara-NKVE Interchange of the New Klang Valley Expressway (NKVE). It would have run elevated above the SPRINT highway until swinging right at Damansara Intan. It would have cut through section 17, past Jasmine Towers and SS2 mall, before running (still elevated) above the entire length of Jalan Semangat. At the end of Jalan Semangat at the junction of Jalan Utara the highway would have split.

The southern carriageway would have passed the Sri Petaling and Bukit Bintang Boys School, and run elevated above Jalan Utara. An off ramp would have fed the traffic destined for the Federal Highway, Petaling Jaya State or University Hospital into Jalan Utara, before the Ehsan Ria Condominium. The elevated road would have continued past Amcorp Mall and around PJ State until rejoining the northern carriageway near the Section 8 police station. From Section 8 PJ the proposed highway headed south through Section 4 and Old Town PJ south, crossing the NPE and KESAS highways before ending at Bandar Kinrara 2.

== Origins ==
2010 – Various proposals were submitted by the private sector for the Damansara – Petaling Jaya – Kinrara corridor to the Malaysian Government. The Damansara – Petaling Jaya – Kinrara corridor was announced in the RMK-10 Budget.

2011 – After reviewing the various proposals, the Malaysian Government issued the Approval in Principle (AIP) to the concessionaire to proceed with detailed studies.

2012 – MTES Approval in Principle on 23 February 2012.

2013 – The Concession Agreement (C.A) for Kinrara – Damansara Expressway (KIDEX) was signed on 15 November 2013.

== Claimed features ==
- Fully elevated expressway with 90% of the alignment being on existing road reserves.
- There are seven interchanges along expressways including Damansara-NKVE, Bandar Utama, Damansara-Sprint, Federal Highway FHR2, Taman Dato Harun-NPE, Kinrara-KESAS and Kinrara–Bukit Jalil Highway.
- There are three toll plaza located at Damansara-NKVE (PLUS), Section 17 and Taman Dato' Harun.
- Separated carriageway in Petaling Jaya.

== Cost ==
The expressway was estimated to cost RM2.42bil and it would have been a 90% elevated expressway. Financing for the highway was to be met through private investors, and the Malaysian government was to pay for acquisition of property along the route. The road was to be a tolled highway, with the toll rate set by the Malaysian government. Most highways in Malaysia have been built and operated by private concessionaires.

== Route Background ==
The route will start from Damansara via Bandar Utama, Damansara Tropicana, Jalan Utara, Petaling Jaya New Town, Taman Dato Harun, Kinrara until Bandar Kinrara district.

== Junction list ==
Petaling Jaya Dispersal Link Expressway (PJD Link)
km	Exit	Name	Destinations	Notes
—	—	Damansara I/C	North–South Expressway Northern Route AH2 New Klang Valley Expressway	Northern terminus
—	T/P	Damansara Toll Plaza	SmartTAG Touch 'n Go MyRFiD	Closed toll system
—	—	Bandar Utama I/C		Proposed
—	—	Bandar Utama (Tropicana) Interchange	Sprint Expressway Damansara Link	Proposed
—	—	Jalan Harapan Toll Plaza	SmartTAG Touch 'n Go MyRFiD	Open toll system
—	—	Jalan Utara I/C		Proposed
—	—	Petaling Jaya New Town I/C		Proposed
—	—	Taman Dato Harun I/C	New Pantai Expressway New Pantai Expressway	Proposed
—	T/P	Kinrara Toll Plaza	SmartTAG Touch 'n Go MyRFiD	Open toll system
—	—	Kinrara–SAE I/C	Shah Alam Expressway Shah Alam Expressway	Proposed
—	—	Bandar Kinrara Section 2 I/C		Proposed
—	—	Bandar Kinrara I/C	FT 217 Bukit Jalil Highway	Proposed
1.000 mi = 1.609 km; 1.000 km = 0.621 mi
