= Ampang District =

Former district

Ampang District was a district in Malaysia that was split into sections, with Federal Territory of Kuala Lumpur and the state of Selangor each taking a part.

== Administration ==
Initially under Selangor jurisdiction, the district was split following the declaration of Kuala Lumpur as a Federal Territory in 1974. The township of Ampang is located in the Federal Territory side and is an eastern suburb of Kuala Lumpur. The district is now divided into two parts:

- Ampang, Selangor, the Selangor segment of Ampang, also known as Ampang Jaya.
- Ampang, Kuala Lumpur, the Kuala Lumpur segment of Ampang, alternately known as Ampang Hilir.

The district was adjacent to Cheras, Kuala Lumpur and northeast of the Kuala Lumpur Central Business District.

== Demographics ==
In 1880, the face of the settlement was drastically altered when the British decided to move their capital of the Federated Malay States inland from Klang, and declared the neighbouring city of Kuala Lumpur to be the new capital. Malays are the largest ethnicity in the Ampang area with 52% of the total population, followed by those of Chinese ancestry at 28%. The smallest racial group is Indian at 20%.

The original "kampongs" (unimproved village structures) of the area were eventually replaced by brick buildings sporting tile roofs, of a standardized shop-house design. Plots were regulated with wider streets between them and "sanitary lanes" behind them. The streets and roads were surfaced with locally found laterite gravel.

== Public Facilities and Places ==
Mall, Hypermarket and Supermarket

	Type	Mall / Hypermarket Name
Ampang, Selangor
Ampang, Selangor	Shopping Mall	Ampang Point
Ampang, Selangor	Shopping Mall	Melawati Mall
Ampang, Selangor	Shopping Mall	Spectrum Mall
Ampang, Selangor	Shopping Mall	Galaxy Ampang
Ampang, Selangor	Shopping Mall	Axis Pandan
Ampang, Selangor	Shopping Mall	Pandan Kapital
Ampang, Kuala Lumpur	Shopping Mall	AEON Mall AU2
Ampang, Kuala Lumpur	Shopping Mall	Datum Jelatek Shopping Centre
Ampang, Selangor	Hypermarket	
Ampang, Selangor	Hypermarket	AEON BiG Ampang
Ampang, Selangor	Hypermarket	Lotus's Ampang
Ampang, Selangor	Hypermarket	Giant Hypermarket Spectrum
Ampang, Selangor	Hypermarket	Giant Superstore Pandan Kapital
Ampang, Selangor	Hypermarket	Giant Superstore Ulu Klang
Ampang, Selangor	Supermarket	The Store MidPoint
Ampang, Selangor	Supermarket	NSK Grocer Paragon Point
Ampang, Selangor	Supermarket	Giant Supermarket Ampang Point
Ampang, Selangor	Supermarket	Giant Supermarket Bukit Antarabangsa
Ampang, Selangor	Supermarket	HeroMarket Taman Dagang
Ampang, Selangor	Supermarket	HeroMarket Taman Melawati
Ampang, Selangor	Supermarket	Village Grocer Melawati Mall
Ampang, Kuala Lumpur	Supermarket	Village Grocer M City
Ampang, Kuala Lumpur	Supermarket	Selections Groceries G Village

	Cinemas & Bowling Centre
Cinemas	GSC Cinemas Melawati Mall
Cinemas	TGV Cinemas Ampang Point
Cinemas	One Cinemas Spectrum Mall
Bowling Centre	Ampang Superbowl Ampang Point

Recreation

- Taman Tasik Ampang Hilir (Ampang, Kuala Lumpur)
- Laman Rekreasi Tasik Tambahan
- Taman Bandar Taman Kosas
- Taman Rekreasi Bukit Indah

LRT Station

	Code	Station Name
3 Ampang	AG18	Ampang LRT Station
3 Ampang	AG17	Cahaya LRT Station
3 Ampang	AG16	Cempaka LRT Station
3 Ampang	AG15	Pandan Indah LRT Station
3 Ampang	AG14	Pandan Jaya LRT Station
5 Kelana Jaya	KJ05	Setiawangsa LRT Station
5 Kelana Jaya	KJ06	Jelatek LRT Station
13 MRT Circle LineMRT Circle Line (Under Planning)	CC17	Taman Hillview
13 MRT Circle LineMRT Circle Line (Under Planning)	CC18	Tasik Ampang
13 MRT Circle LineMRT Circle Line (Under Planning)	CC19	Kampung Pandan
13 MRT Circle LineMRT Circle Line (Under Planning)	CC20	Pandan Indah (Connecting station with LRT Pandan Indah)
13 MRT Circle LineMRT Circle Line (Under Planning)	CC21	Taman Kencana

Bus Routes

Code	Routes
300	Pandan Mewah - KLCC - Lebuh Ampang
303	Taman Mulia Jaya - KLCC - Lebuh Ampang
T300	Bukit Indah - Ampang Point via Jalan Rasmi
T301	Taman Mulia Jaya - Ampang Point via Jalan Merdeka
T302	Hutan Lipur Ampang - Ampang Point
T303	LRT Pandan Indah - Ampang Point
T304	Bukit Indah - Ampang Point via LRT Ampang
T350	LRT Cempaka - Taman Mawar
T351	LRT Cempaka - Taman Bukit Permai

Highways

Code	Highway Name	Connects
Sungai Besi Expressway	Besraya Expressway (BESRAYA)	Sungai Besi - MRR2 (Pandan Jaya); Shamelin - Pandan Indah
Ampang–Kuala Lumpur Elevated Highway	Ampang-Kuala Lumpur Elevated Highway (AKLEH)	Ampang - Kuala Lumpur
Sungai Besi–Ulu Klang Elevated Expressway	Sungai Besi-Ulu Klang Elevated Expressway (SUKE)	Sungai Besi, Shah Alam Expressway KESAS - Ulu Klang
East Klang Valley Expressway	East Klang Valley Expressway (EKVE)	Kajang, Kajang Dispersal Link Expressway Kajang SILK - Ulu Klang
East Klang Valley Expressway	KL Node Expressway (Under Planning)	Ulu Klang - Templer Park
Duta–Ulu Klang Expressway	Duta-Ulu Klang Expressway (DUKE)	Jalan Duta, North–South Expressway Northern Route PLUS - Ulu Klang
FT 28	Kuala Lumpur Middle Ring Road 2 (MRR2)	Bandar Sri Damansara - Sri Petaling, Shah Alam Expressway KESAS

Hospital

- Hospital Ampang
- KPJ Ampang Puteri Specialist Hospital
- Pantai Hospital
- Gleneagles Hospital

Places of Interest and Focus

- Zoo Negara
- Ampang Recreational Forest
- Kelab Darul Ehsan
