= Sungai Besi Expressway =

Controlled-access highway in Malaysia

Expressway 9
- Sungai Besi Expressway; Lebuhraya Sungai Besi
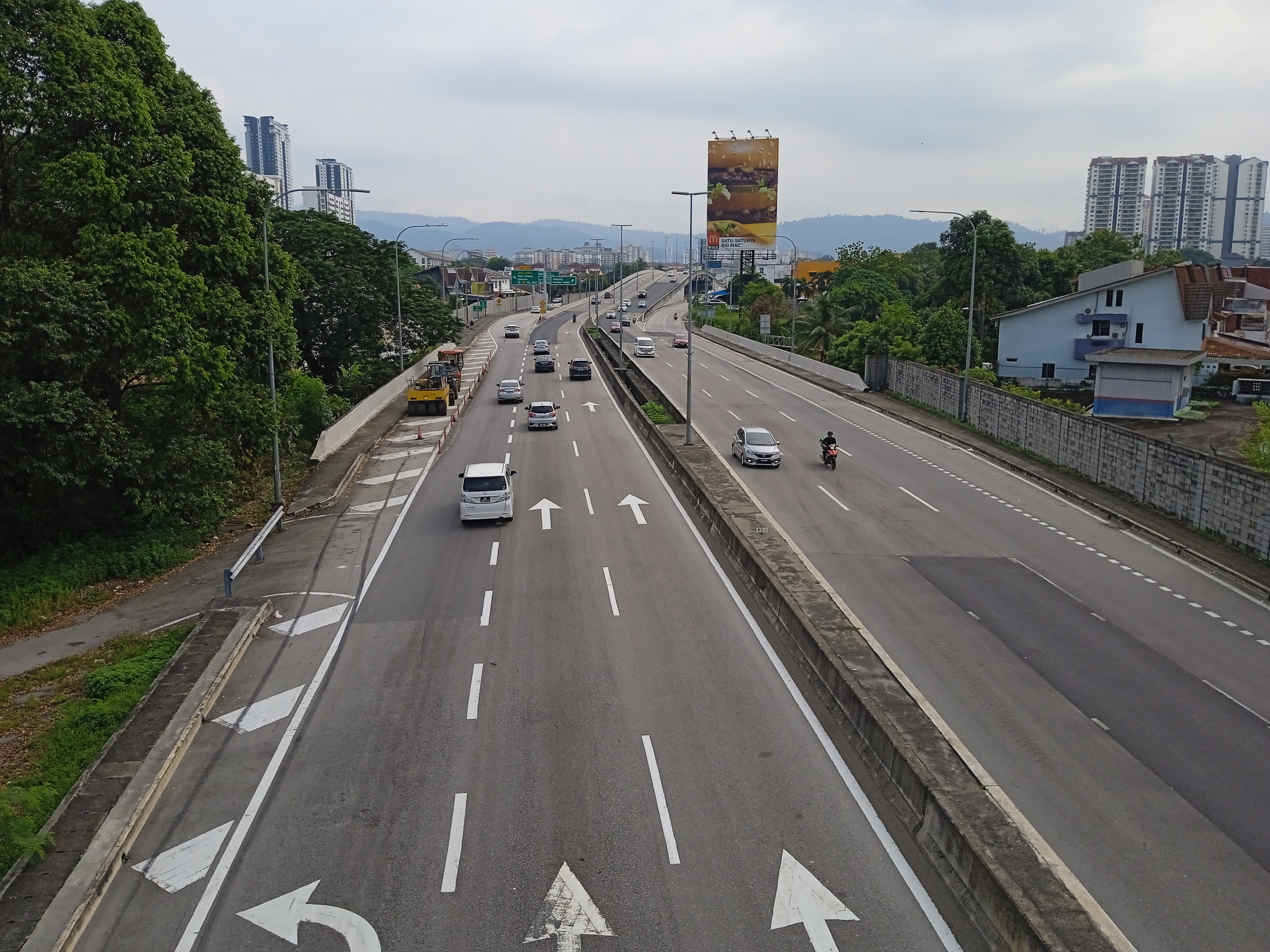

Route information
- Maintained by Besraya Sdn Bhd
- Length: 28.3 km (17.6 mi)
- Existed: 1998–present
- History: Completed in 2000

Major junctions
- South end: Kajang Dispersal Link Expressway at Serdang, Selangor
- North–South Expressway Southern Route; FT 3215 Jalan Seri Kembangan; FT 28 Kuala Lumpur Middle Ring Road 2; Jalan Kuchai Lama; East–West Link Expressway; Kuala Lumpur–Seremban Expressway; Kuala Lumpur Middle Ring Road 1; FT 1 Cheras Highway
- North end: Jalan Pandan 1 at Ampang, Selangor

Location
- Country: Malaysia
- Primary destinations: Pandan Indah, Shamelin, Salak South, Kuchai Lama, Sri Petaling, Sungai Besi, Mines Resort City, Seri Kembangan, Balakong, Putrajaya

Highway system
- Highways in Malaysia; Expressways; Federal; State

The Sungai Besi Expressway, abbreviated as SBE, is a major controlled-access highway in the Klang Valley region of Peninsular Malaysia. The 28.3-kilometre (17.6-mile) expressway runs between Serdang and Ampang, Selangor through southeastern Kuala Lumpur, parallel and directly adjacent to the North–South Expressway and the Kuala Lumpur–Seremban Expressway.

== Route ==
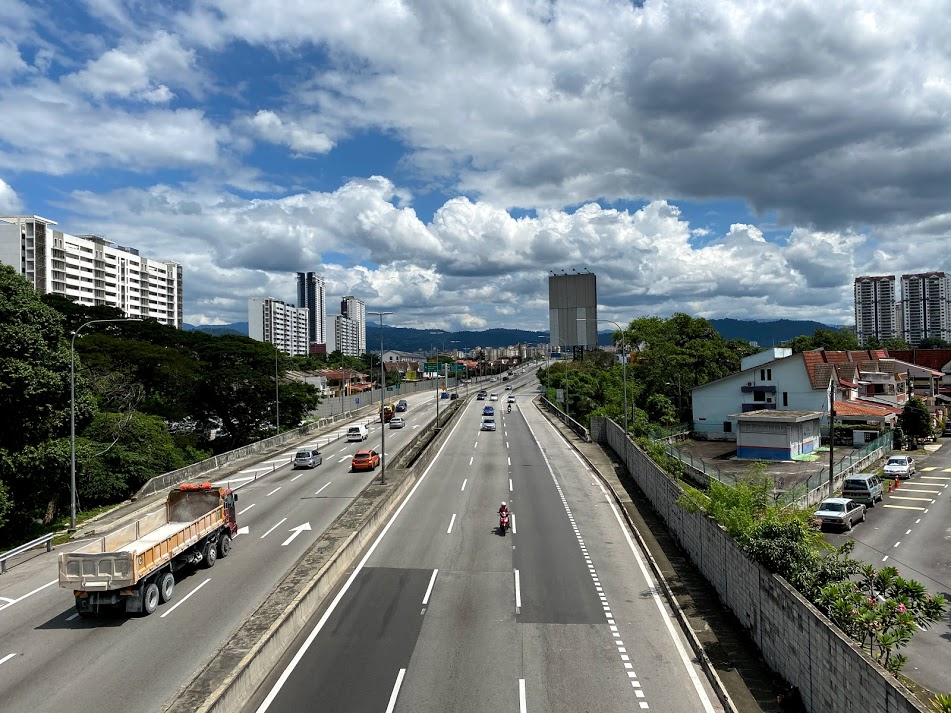
Cheras section

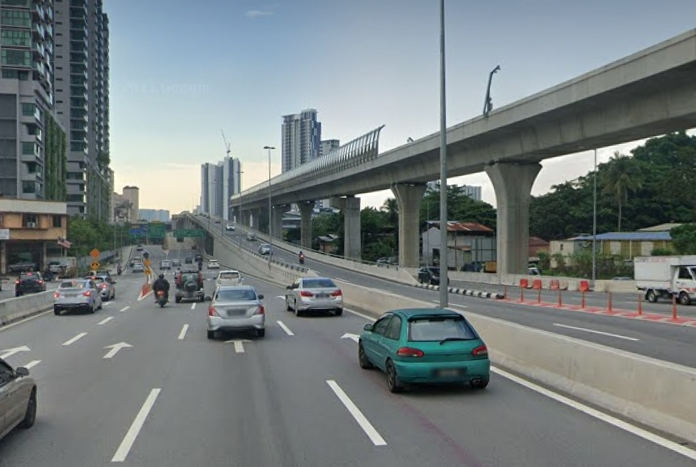
Heading to Kuchai Lama Interchange

The expressway begins at Serdang on the outskirts of Universiti Putra Malaysia, where it continues from the Kajang Dispersal Link Expressway. The expressway then runs northwards immediately east of the North–South Expressway through Seri Kembangan into Sungai Besi. The expressway continues alongside the Kuala Lumpur–Seremban Expressway, running through Bandar Tasik Selatan, Kuchai Lama, Salak South and Cheras. The expressway then diverts northeastwards to Pandan Jaya and Pandan Indah in Ampang, where it terminates.

== History ==
Construction of the original 16.0-kilometre (9.9-mile) expressway from Jalan Istana to Serdang began in 1997, by Road Builder (M) Holdings Bhd (later acquired by IJM Corporation Berhad in 2007). The expressway used to be Selangor state road, B13, and the official name was Jalan Kuala Lumpur–Sungai Besi. During construction, the status of the road was changed to a tolled expressway and it was redesignated E9. The expressway commenced tolling operation on 15 May 1999.

The project to upgrade the Sungai Besi interchange from a half-diamond interchange to a non-stop interchange started in 2005 and completed in 2007.

The project to upgrade the Balakong interchange from a T-junction to a directional-T interchange started in 2004 and completed in 2006.

The Salak Jaya toll plaza was abolished on 24 February 2009.

== Besraya Eastern Extension Expressway ==
Following the abolishment of toll collections at the Salak Jaya toll plaza on 25 February 2009, the then Works Minister, Mohd. Zin Mohamad announced the future expansion of the expressway, known as the Besraya Eastern Extension Expressway (BEE), whose concession would be awarded to Besraya. The expressway was completed on 2013 and was opened to traffic on 15 April 2014.

The 12.3 km (7.6 mi) extension, which is mostly elevated, connects Salak South (North) interchange on the Kuala Lumpur Middle Ring Road 1 to the Kuala Lumpur Middle Ring Road 2 near Pandan Indah. The 12.3 km (7.6 mi) extension elevated expressway has interchanges at Salak South, Jalan Istana, Taman Ikan Emas, Jalan Loke Yew, Jalan Cheras Lama, Shamelin Perkasa, MRR2 North (where Jalan Pandan Jaya intersects the MRR2), MRR2 South (where Jalan Pandan Indah intersects the MRR2), Pandan Jaya and Jalan Pandan Utama near Pandan Indah.

== Toll system ==
Toll transactions at the Loke Yew and Mines toll plaza are made via Touch 'n Go, SmartTAG, and Visa and MasterCard.

=== Toll rates ===
(Since 1 January 2023)

Class	Types of vehicles	Rate (in Malaysian Ringgit (RM))	
Class	Types of vehicles	Mines	Loke Yew
0	Motorcycles (Vehicles with two axles and two wheels)	Free	
1	Private Cars (Vehicles with two axles and three or four wheels (excluding taxi and bus))	1.85	
2	Vans and other small good vehicles (Vehicles with two axles and six wheels (excluding bus))	3.70	
3	Large Trucks (Vehicles with three or more axles (excluding bus))	3.70	
4	Taxis	1.85	
5	Buses	1.30	1.85

=== Toll names ===
Abbreviation	Name
TMS	Mines
TLY	Loke Yew

== Interchange lists ==
Legend:

- I/C - Interchange, I/S - Intersection, RSA - Rest and service area, OBR - Overhead bridge restaurant, R/R - Restaurant and rest plaza, L/B - Layby, V/P - Vista point, TN - tunnel, T/P - Toll plaza, BR - Bridge
- C - Cloverleaf, S - Stack, T-A - Trumpet-A, T-B - Trumpet-B, DT - Directional-T/Y, SDT - Semi-Directional-T/Y, P-Y - Partial-Y, D - Diamond, P-C - Partial cloverleaf, D-D - Diverging diamond, D-R - Direct ramp

=== Main Link ===
States	District	Km	Exit	Interchange	Destinations	Notes
Selangor	Sepang	Through to Kajang Dispersal Link Expressway (SILK)				
Selangor	Hulu Langat	0.0	901	UPM I/C	B13 Jalan Serdang – Universiti Putra Malaysia (UPM), Seri Kembangan, Serdang; North–South Expressway Southern Route – Kuala Lumpur, Bangi, Seremban, Port Dickson, Malacca, Johor Bahru	Diamond interchange
Selangor	Hulu Langat		RSA	Desa Serdang RSA	Desa Serdang RSA – BH Petrol	Kuala Lumpur bound
Selangor	Petaling			Kampung Desa Serdang		
Selangor	Petaling		BR	Railway crossing bridge		
Selangor	Petaling			Serdang Komuter Station	Serdang Komuter station KTM Komuter	Kuala Lumpur bound
Selangor	Petaling		902	Balakong I/C	Kajang Dispersal Link Expressway – Balakong, Kajang, Mines Resort City, Seremban, Kuala Pilah	Directional-T interchange
Selangor	Petaling		903	Seri Kembangan I/C	FT 3215 Jalan Seri Kembangan – Seri Kembangan	Diamond interchange
Selangor	Petaling		T/P	Mines toll plaza (Southbound)	Touch 'n Go SmartTAG MyRFID	
Selangor	Petaling			Mines	Mines Resort City – Palace of The Golden Horses, Malaysia International Exhibition and Convention Centre (MIECC)	UPM bound
Kuala Lumpur			904	Selangor Turf Club I/C	FT 217 Bukit Jalil Highway – Puchong, Bandar Kinrara, Seremban, KL Sports City, Pavilion Bukit Jalil, Selangor Turf Club	Interchange
Kuala Lumpur			RSA	Mines RSA	Mines RSA – Petron	UPM bound
Kuala Lumpur			T/P	Mines toll plaza (Northbound)	Touch 'n Go SmartTAG MyRFID	
Kuala Lumpur			905	Sungai Besi Town I/C	Jalan Sungai Besi – Sungai Besi, National Defense University of Malaysia (UPNM); Sungai Besi station 4 12; FT 28 Kuala Lumpur Middle Ring Road 2 – Cheras, Bandar Tasik Selatan, Ampang, Kuantan; Jalan Tasik Utama – Lake Fields	Interchange
Kuala Lumpur		8.60		Elevated U-Turn	U-Turn	Southbound
Kuala Lumpur				Jalan Landai Permai Exit	Jalan Landai Permai – PPR Raya Permai	Kuala Lumpur bound
Kuala Lumpur		9.50		U-Turn		Both Directions
Kuala Lumpur			906A	Taman Castlefield I/C	Jalan/1C 149 – Taman Castlefield, Sri Petaling; Sungai Besi–Ulu Klang Elevated Expressway – Cheras, Hulu Langat, Ampang, Ulu Kelang; Shah Alam Expressway – KL Sports City, Puchong, Subang Jaya, Shah Alam, Klang, Pulau Indah	UPM bound exits to expressways and entrance to both directions from SUKE only
Kuala Lumpur			906B	Bandar Tasik Selatan (Terminal Bersepadu Selatan) I/C	Persiaran Terminal Bersepadu Selatan – Terminal Bersepadu Selatan – Arrival/Departure; P&R Bandar Tasik Selatan station KTM ETS KTM Komuter 7 4	Trumpet interchange
Kuala Lumpur				Kampung Malaysia	Kampung Malaysia Tambahan; Kampung Malaysia Raya	Southbound
Kuala Lumpur				Desa Petaling slip road	Desa Petaling slip road from Kuala Lumpur–Seremban Expressway	
Kuala Lumpur		10.50		U-Turn	U-Turn	Both directions
Kuala Lumpur			907	Kuchai Lama I/C	Jalan Kuchai Lama – Kuchai Lama; FT 2 Jalan Klang Lama – Petaling Jaya; New Pantai Expressway – Subang Jaya, Bandar Sunway, Bangsar	Interchange
Kuala Lumpur				Former Salak Jaya toll plaza location		
Kuala Lumpur			RSA	Salak Jaya RSA	Salak Jaya RSA –	UPM bound
Kuala Lumpur			908	Salak Jaya I/C	Taman Sungai Besi; Salak Jaya	Diamond interchange
Kuala Lumpur			909	East–West I/C	East–West Link Expressway – Seremban, Bangsar, Petaling Jaya, Shah Alam, Klang, Bandar Tun Razak, Cheras, Kajang	LILO diamond interchange
Kuala Lumpur				Salak South Exit	Jalan Besar – Salak South, Bandar Seri Pemaisuri; Salak Selatan Komuter station KTM Komuter	South bound
Kuala Lumpur			BR	Railway crossing bridge		
Kuala Lumpur				U-Turn	U-Turn	
Kuala Lumpur				JKR Housing Quarters		North bound
Kuala Lumpur				Salak South Exit	Jalan Besar – Salak South, Bandar Seri Pemaisuri; Salak Selatan Komuter station KTM Komuter	South bound
Kuala Lumpur			911	Salak South (North) I/C; Sungai Kerayong bridge	Kuala Lumpur Middle Ring Road 1 – Jalan Dewan Bahasa, Bangsar, Damansara, Istana Negara (Royal Museum), KL Sentral, City Centre, KLCC, Jalan Duta, Ipoh, Kuantan; Kuala Lumpur–Seremban Expressway – Seremban, Johor Bahru, Petaling Jaya, Subang Jaya, Shah Alam, Klang	Expressway interchange
Kuala Lumpur			912	Ikan Emas I/C	Sungai Besi Expressway (Jalan Istana Link) (Through Kuala Lumpur Middle Ring Road 1) – City Centre, KL Sentral, Petaling Jaya, Bangsar, Damansara	Elevated trumpet interchange
Kuala Lumpur				Loke Yew I/C	FT 1 Jalan Loke Yew – No access	Eastbound entrance from northwest only
Kuala Lumpur			T/P	Loke Yew toll plaza	Touch 'n Go SmartTAG MyRFID MyRFID SmartTAG Touch 'n Go	
Kuala Lumpur			BR	Shamelin viaduct Sungai Kerayong bridge		
Kuala Lumpur			914A	Jalan Cheras Lama I/C	Jalan Cheras Lama – City Centre, Maluri, Cochrane, Maluri LRT/MRT 3 9 , Cheras	Interchange, from Jalan Istana and Sungai Besi only
Kuala Lumpur			914C	Persiaran Pandan I/C	Sungai Besi Expressway (Pandan Indah Link) – Pandan Indah, Taman Shamelin Perkasa, Bandar Baru Ampang	Interchange
Kuala Lumpur			BR	Sungai Kerayong bridge		
Kuala Lumpur			BR	Railway crossing bridge		
FT Kuala Lumpur–Selangor border			BR	Pandan Jaya viaduct		
Selangor	Hulu Langat		915	Pandan Perdana I/C	Jalan Pandan 1 – Pandan Jaya, central Kuala Lumpur, Maluri, Kuantan, Ulu Klang, Ampang	Interchange; From Jalan Istana and Sungai Besi only
Selangor	Hulu Langat		BR	Pandan Jaya viaduct		
Selangor	Hulu Langat			MRR2 (North) I/C	FT 28 Kuala Lumpur Middle Ring Road 2 – Ampang, Ulu Klang, Gombak, Batu Caves, Kepong, Genting Highlands, Kuantan	Interchange

=== Pandan Indah Link ===
Sungai Besi Expressway
- Pandan Indah Link
- Location: Jalan Istana–Jalan Pandan Indah
- Length: 12.3 km (7.6 mi)
- Existed: 2009–present
- History: Completed in 2014

State/territory	District	Location	km	mi	Exit	Name	Destinations	Notes
Kuala Lumpur	Cheras	Maluri			Through to Jalan Istana			
Kuala Lumpur	Cheras	Maluri			Loke Yew toll plaza			
Kuala Lumpur	Cheras	Maluri					Sungai Besi Expressway (Main Link) – Seremban, Putrajaya, Subang, Sungai Besi	Eastbound exit and westbound entrance only
Kuala Lumpur	Cheras	Maluri					Jalan 1/91 – central Kuala Lumpur; Jalan Cheras – No access	No eastbound exit; no westbound exit from north
Kuala Lumpur	Cheras–Titiwangsa boundary	Pudu Ulu					Jalan Perdana Utama – (Shamelin Perkasa); Jalan Mahkota – No access Jalan 1/91 – No access	Westbound exit/entrance to/from south, and eastbound entrance only
Selangor	Hulu Langat	Pandan Indah					Jalan Indah – (Pandan Perdana)	
Selangor	Hulu Langat	Pandan Indah			915	Pandan Perdana	FT 28 Kuala Lumpur Middle Ring Road 2 – Kuantan, Ulu Klang, Cheras, Seremban, Shah Alam, Klang	Eastbound exit/entrance to/from north and westbound exit/entrance to/from south only
Selangor	Hulu Langat	Pandan Indah					Jalan Pandan Indah – (Pandan Indah)	
Selangor	Hulu Langat	Pandan Indah			Through to Jalan Pandan Indah			
1.000 mi = 1.609 km; 1.000 km = 0.621 mi: Electronic toll collection; Incomplete access; Route transition
