= Ampang =

Ampang is a common place name in Malaysia and may refer to:

- Jalan Ampang, a major street in Kuala Lumpur
- Ampang, Selangor, a city within Selangor, formed from a portion of the former Ampang District
- Ampang, Kuala Lumpur, the eastern portion of the former Ampang district
- Ampang District, a former district
- Ampang Subdistrict (mukim), a subdistrict of Hulu Langat district of Selangor
- Ampang (federal constituency), represented in the Dewan Rakyat
- Ampang Jaya (federal constituency), formerly represented in the Dewan Rakyat (1986–2004)
- Ampang (state constituency), formerly represented in the Selangor State Legislative Assembly (1959–86; 1995–2004)

== See also ==
- Ampang Park, a shopping center
