= Ampang, Kuala Lumpur =

Ampang
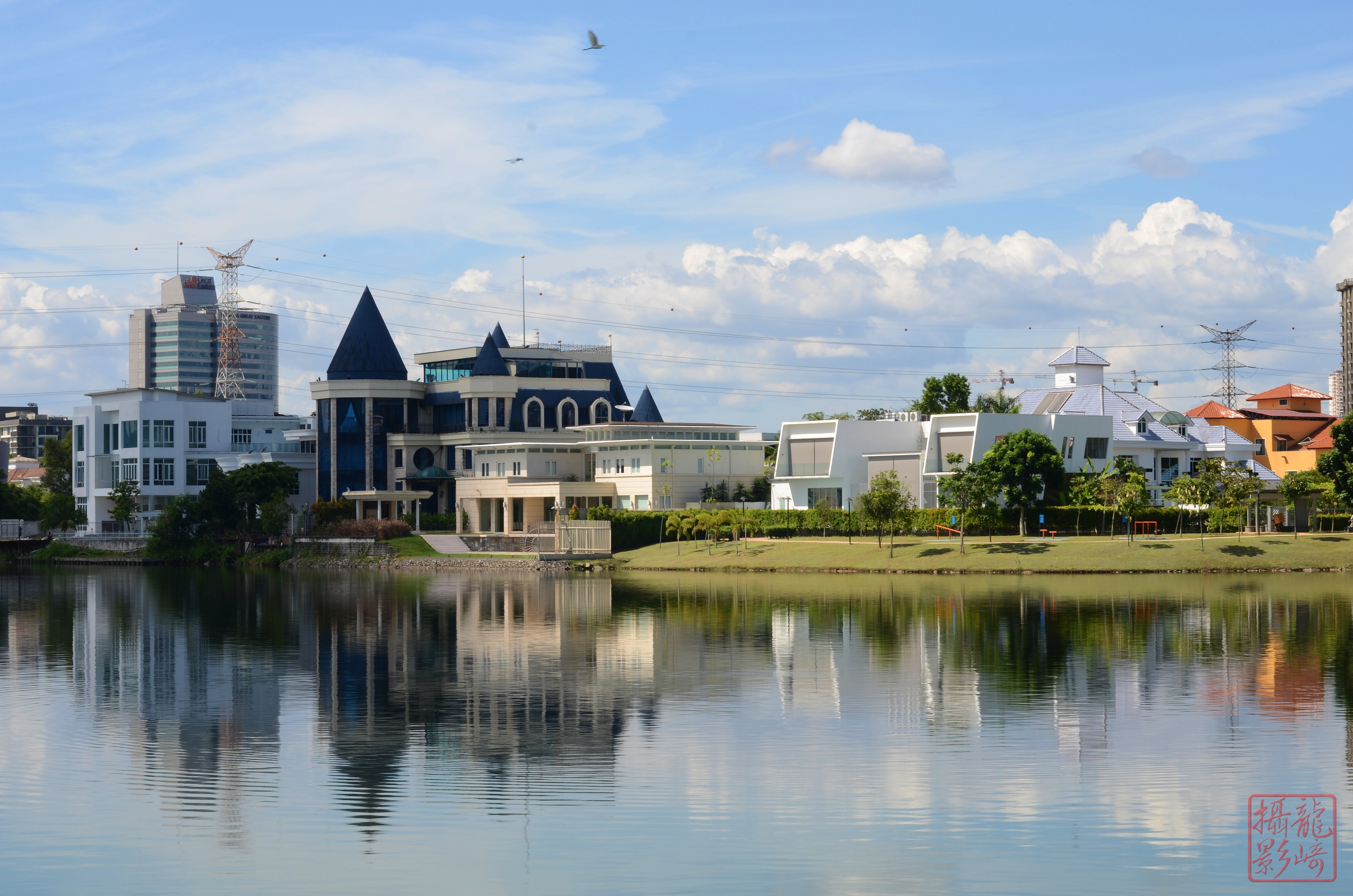
- Ampang lake

- Location within Malaysia
- Coordinates: 3°9′38″N 101°44′9″E
- Country: Malaysia
- State: Federal Territory of Kuala Lumpur
- Constituency: Titiwangsa

Government
  - Local Authority: Kuala Lumpur City Hall
  - Mayor: Maimunah Mohd Sharif
- Time zone: UTC+8 (MST)
- Postcode: 68xxx
- Dialling code: +603-2, +603-4, +603-9
- Police: Dang Wangi
- Fire: Pudu

Ampang, or Ampang Hilir, is a ward and city district, in the eastern part of Kuala Lumpur (KL) in the Titiwangsa constituency. Its area in Kuala Lumpur can be identified as being along the Ampang Road and Ampang Hilir.

== History ==
Ampang's history is closely related to the history of Kuala Lumpur. In 1857, Raja Abdullah, a representative of the Selangor Sultanate, opened up the Klang Valley for tin mining. 87 Chinese miners from Lukut went up the river Klang and landed at Kuala Lumpur, then walked for a few miles through a jungle path to Ampang and began prospecting in the Ampang area. However, within a month 69 of the 87 miners had died due to the malarial conditions of the area, and Raja Abdullah sent another 150 men to continue the work. Eventually the death rate dropped, and the first tin was exported in 1859. The success of tin mining at Ampang led to the development of Kuala Lumpur. The name "Ampang" is the reference of the word "empang" which means "dam" in Malay and the place was named in reference to the miners' dams.

Kuala Lumpur of which Ampang Hilir is part of was made capital of Selangor in 1880, and the capital of Malaysia in 1963.

In 1974, following the declaration of Kuala Lumpur as a Federal Territory, the once-larger Ampang district was divided, with the western part going to the Federal Territory, and the eastern part remaining in Selangor, later to become Ampang Jaya. The district of Cheras was also similarly partitioned in 1974.

== Architecture ==
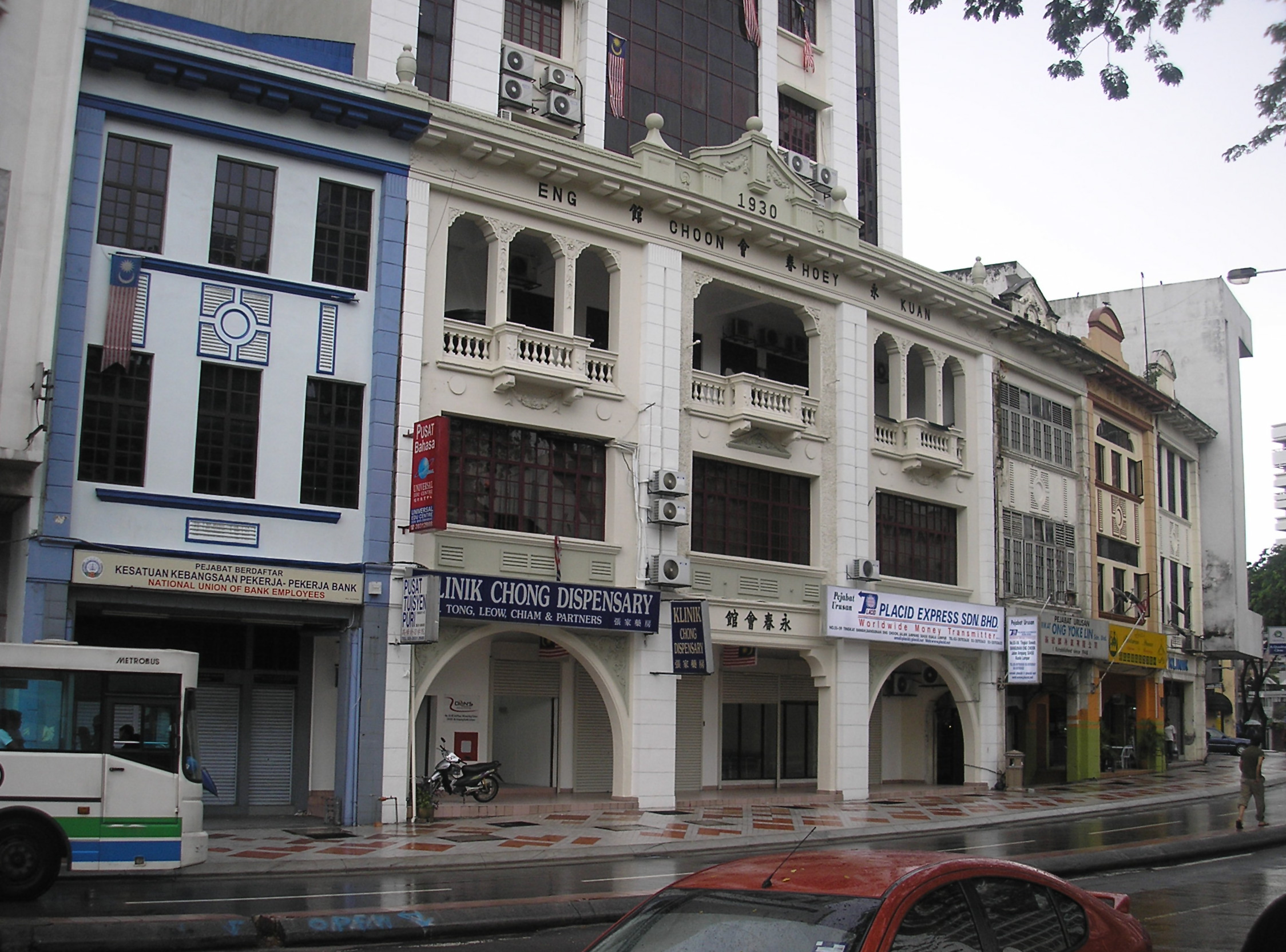
Pre-war buildings on Ampang Road. Only one of the buildings pictured still retains the original windows.

There are many pre-war buildings along Ampang Road. The Eng Choon Assembly Hall on Ampang Road for example was built in 1930. Its inner structure was rebuilt to support a taller building within. Eu Tong Sen, a leading businessman in the early 1900s, built a villa in 1935 on Ampang Road. The same location was used by the British government as a military base. Over time it was renovated and reopened as the National Art Gallery on 27 August 1958 and much later refurbished to become the Malaysia Tourism Centre (MaTiC). Eu Tong Sen also owned a tin mine in Ampang which was the first to install an electricity generator in 1914.

Founded in March 1896, the Selangor Turf Club's former horse racing venue was one of the most popular landmarks in Ampang until it was demolished on 1 March 1997 to make way for the Petronas Twin Towers project.

Many pre-war and British colonial buildings were extensively renovated and modernised. Lack of clear guidelines for architectural conservation in the city means unregulated alterations of pre-war buildings are common.

== Geography ==
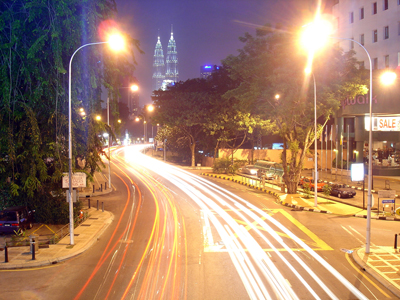
The busy Ampang Road at night leading straight to the Petronas Twin Towers.

At 3°9′38″N 101°44′9″E, Ampang Hilir is situated to the east of the Kuala Lumpur city centre, bordering KLCC (Petronas Towers) and Bukit Bintang to the west, Dato' Keramat to the north, Ampang Jaya and Pandan Jaya (Selangor) to the east, and Maluri to the south.

Ampang has several large lakes due to its tin mining history.

== Transportation ==
=== Car ===
Ampang Road (from Leboh Ampang in KL to the main road in front of Ampang LRT station) is the main road to Ampang Jaya and is easily accessible from Jalan Tun Razak or Jalan Ulu Kelang from the Hulu Kelang or Setapak direction. It is also accessible from Cheras through Jalan Shamelin, from Jalan Tun Razak through Jalan Kampung Pandan via Taman Cempaka, from Kampung Pandan through Jalan Kampung Pandan Dalam via Taman Nirwana, from the Kuala Lumpur Middle Ring Road 2 via Pandan Indah & Taman Kencana and from Hulu Langat town through the mountain pass. Wangsa Maju, Setapak, central Kuala Lumpur, Ampang Park and Salak South surround Ampang.

=== Public transportation ===
Ampang Park LRT station is the principal metro/rail station in Ampang Hilir. It is also a major bus node for rapidKL buses (routes 300, 302, 303, 402, GO KL Green) Other nearby stations are LRT KLCC and MRT TRX.

== Embassies ==
Many embassies are located in the Ampang area, and still remain there despite the Malaysian government's relocation to the new administrative centre in Putrajaya. The embassies are located along Ampang Road, including those of the United Kingdom, France, China, Russian Federation, Indonesia, Ireland and Thailand. The Singapore High Commission and the US embassy are also located near Ampang at the corner of Jalan Tun Razak and Jalan U Thant.

== Art and culture ==
The National Art Gallery is in the direction of Kuala Lumpur's downtown area. It displays creative and contemporary art pieces and sculptures. Located just next to the National Art Gallery is the Istana Budaya, Malaysia's cultural centre where performances and theatres are held.

== Other attractions ==
Ampang Hilir is notable for being home to the Ampang Park Shopping Complex, Malaysia's first shopping complex, which was demolished in 2018 to make way for the Sungai Buloh-Putrajaya metro line.

== See also ==
- Ampang, Selangor, Selangor's segment of greater Ampang.

== Sister cities ==
- Bekasi, Indonesia
