= Kajang Municipal Council =

Local government in Selangor, Malaysia

Kajang Municipal Council Majlis Perbandaran Kajang
- Local Government Act 1976
- Emblem used since 1997

Type
- Type: Local authority of the Hulu Langat

Leadership
- President: Nazli Md Taib

Structure
- Political groups: Councillors: DAP (9); PKR (9); Amanah (5); Orang Besar Hulu Langat (1)

Motto
- Beretika, Kehidupan, Berkualiti; Ethic, Life, Quality

Meeting place
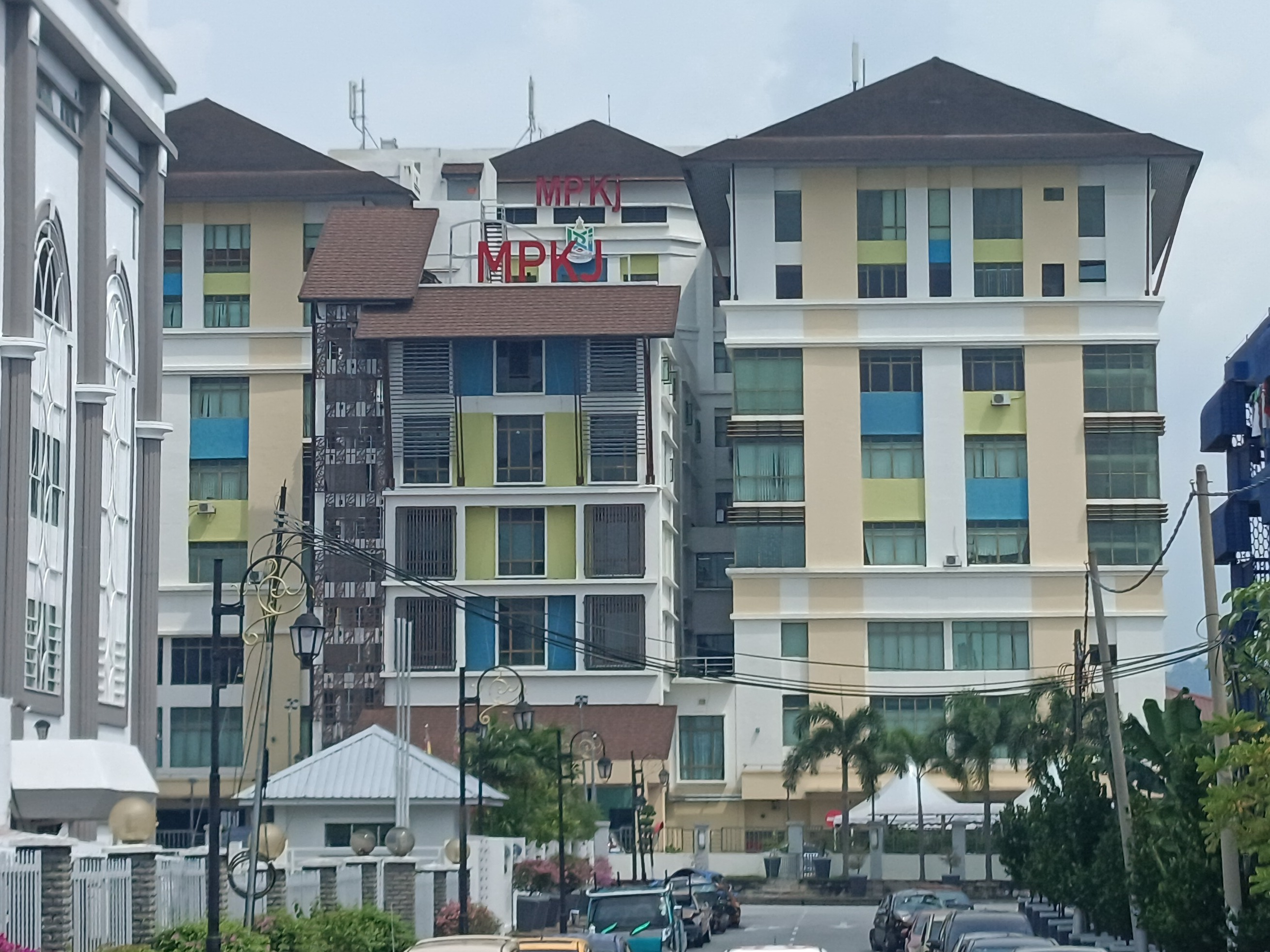
- MPKj Headquarters, Kajang

Website
- www.mpkj.gov.my

Kajang Municipal Council (Malay: Majlis Perbandaran Kajang) is the local government authority serving Hulu Langat District in Selangor, Malaysia.

== History ==
The Kajang Municipal Council was granted municipal status on 1 January 1997. Previously it was known as Hulu Langat District Council (Majlis Daerah Hulu Langat, MDHL). Under the Local Government Act 1976, Kajang Municipal Council administrate Kajang, Bandar Baru Bangi, Cheras, Semenyih, Beranang and Hulu Langat.

== Elected representatives ==
=== Member of Parliament ===
Parliament	Party	Incumbent
Hulu Langat	National Trust Party	YB Tuan Mohd Sany Hamzan
Bangi	Democratic Action Party	YB Tuan Syahredzan Johan

=== Member of the Legislative Assembly ===
State of Constituency	Party	Incumbent
Dusun Tua	Barisan Nasional	YB Datuk Wira Johan Abd Aziz
Semenyih	Malaysian Islamic Party	YB Nushi Mahfodz
Kajang	People's Justice Party	YB David Cheong
Sungai Ramal	Malaysian Islamic Party	YB Mohd Shafie Ngah
Balakong	Democratic Action Party	YB Wayne Ong Chun Wei

== Councillors ==
Session:2023

Zone No.	Member	Party
PKR 9 | DAP 9 | AMANAH 5 | Orang Besar Hulu Langat 1
1	Abdul Jalal Abdul Rani @ Mohd Azmir	Orang Besar Hulu Langat
10	Ellia Aliza Md Arith	PKR
14	Muhammad Nashriq Bin Zailan	PKR
3	Lim Kim Eng	PKR
13	Balamulari Govindaraju	PKR
15	Ong Seng Peng	PKR
20	Chandran Ramasamy	PKR
9	Siti Razimi A. Razak	PKR
21	Ramachandran Arjenan	PKR
22	Mohd Zulkifli Ridzwan	PKR
19	Thiagarajah Rajagopal	DAP
4	Suzannah Hanim Wong	DAP
12	Khoo Khim Han	DAP
8	Nor Zulaila Abdul Ghani	DAP
6	Billy Sun Kin Wah	DAP
2	Farhan Haziq Mohamed	DAP
11	Kwan Say Hong	DAP
5	Dickson Tan Tee Guan	DAP
7	Sangeetha Chandra Mohan	DAP
24	Rawiyiah Zakaria	AMANAH
23	Samsol Bahari	AMANAH
16	Mohd Bukhari Bachok	AMANAH
18	Nasar Khan Mirbas Khan	AMANAH
17	Rozeeta Ramli	AMANAH

== Headquarters ==
The headquarters of Kajang Municipal Council is located at Jalan Cempaka Kuning in the city centre of Kajang, nearby the Stadium Kajang MRT station.

== Administration area ==
MPKJ covers the entire Hulu Langat region except Ampang.

MPKJ's municipal area covers the entire Hulu Langat region, except Ampang Jaya and Pandan Indah, which were ceded in 1992 to the Ampang Jaya Municipal Council. Major cities and towns in the area include Kajang, Semenyih, Bandar Baru Bangi, Cheras, Hulu Langat town and Dusun Tua.

ZONE 1

- Kampung Sungai Serai
- Taman Desa Sentosa
- Kampung Baru Sungai Makau
- Kampung Kenangan
- Pekan Batu 14 Hulu Langat
- Pekan Batu 18 Hulu Langat
- Rumah Murah Baru 2 1/2
- Rumah Murah Kampung Padang
- Rumah Murah Bukit Kundang
- Taman Dusun Nanding
- Taman Perkasa
- Taman Koperasi UDA
- Taman Indah Jaya
- Taman Desa Raya
- Taman Titiwangsa
- Taman Damai
- Taman Pinggiran Delima
- Taman Desa Pelangi
- Taman Perkasa Indah
- Taman Wawasan
- Taman Bukit Sekawan
- Taman Impian Langat
- Taman Impian Warisan
- Taman Lestari Indah
- Taman Lagenda Suria
- Taman Seri Nanding
- Taman Seri Mas
- Taman Desa Saujana Langat
- Taman Langat Ceria
- Taman Bukit Raya
- KP Sungai Tekali
- Kampung Sungai Sop
- Kampung Sungai Tekali
- Taman Pinggiran Nanding
- Laman Kesuma
- Taman Sri Kundang

ZONE 2

- Taman Wangsa Cheras
- Taman Kemacahaya
- Taman Puteri (Venice Hills)
- Taman Bukit Hatamas
- Hijauan Residence
- Taman Suria Residence
- Taman Idaman
- Taman Idaman Langat
- Taman Hulu Langat Jaya
- PGA Cheras
- Taman Segar Perdana
- Taman Cheras Awana
- Taman Cheras Hartamas
- Taman Cheras Zen
- Taman Cuepax
- Taman Fern Grove
- Taman Cheras Permata
- Taman Alam Jaya
- Taman Sunway Cheras
- KP Mas Jaya
- Taman Mudun
- Taman Emas
- Taman Sri Mujur
- Taman Orkid
- Taman Suntex
- Taman Cheras Permai
- Taman Mas
- Taman Sri Raya
- Taman Prima Suria
- Taman Permas Mas
- Kampung Baru Batu 9 Cheras
- Taman Cheras Mas
- Taman Puteri Jaya
- Taman Kota Cheras
- Taman Damai Jaya
- Taman Shahjaya Cheras
- Batu 10 Cheras

ZONE 3

- Bandar Mahkota Cheras
- Taman Desa Permai
- Taman Taming Mutiara
- Taman Cheras Vista
- Taman Seri Budiman
- Taman Desa Permai 2
- Desa Budiman
- Taman Taming Mutiara 3
- Taman Makmur
- Taman Ikhlas
- Taman Bukit Permai
- Taman Desa Permai
- Mahkota Residence
- KP Budiman
- SL 12

ZONE 4

- Bandar Tun Hussein Onn
- Taman Suria Jaya
- Taman Bukit Prima
- Taman Kasturi
- Taman Cheras Mewah
- Taman Bukit Angsana
- Taman Seri Bahagia
- Taman Minang
- Taman Minang Ria
- Taman Sri Cheras
- Taman Tun Perak
- Cheras Perdana
- Taman Seri Cheras Jaya
- Taman Murni
- Taman Megah
- Taman Desa Wangsa
- Taman Megah 2
- Taman Puncak Perdana
- Kampung Baru Cheras
- Lake Vista Residence
- Silk Residence
- Pekan Batu 11 Cheras
- Taman Duta Emas

ZONE 5

- Bandar Damai Perdana
- Taman Beringin
- Taman Sutera Residence
- Cloud Tree
- Windows On The Park
- Laman Sri Cahaya
- Sky Residence
- Taman Juara Jaya
- Taman Bukit Belimbing
- KP Kampung Baru Balakong
- Kampung Baru Balakong
- Taman Harmoni
- Taman Harmoni Indah
- Taman Desa Baiduri
- Taman Seri Taming
- Taman Jaya Baru
- Taman Damai Indah
- Taman Cheras Utama
- Vina Residence

ZONE 6

- Taman Balakong Jaya
- KP Balakong Jaya 2
- KP Balakong Jaya 2 Tambahan
- Taman Perindustrian Taming Jaya
- Taman Perindustrian Selesa Jaya
- Taman Taming Jaya
- Taman Impian Indah
- Taman Puncak Utama
- Taman Seri Timah
- Blu Constellation
- Kampung Kenangan
- Taman KYK Height
- Taman Putra Budiman
- Bayu Park Ville
- Desa Serdang
- Bukit Gita Bayu
- Kawasan Perniagaan Desa Kiara
- Taman Mesra Utama
- Taman Bayu Height 2
- Apartment Seri Pulai

ZONE 7

- Country Height
- KP Desa Serdang
- KP Bukit Angkat
- KP Kidamai
- KP Balakong Jaya
- Taman Meringin
- Taman Sutera
- Taman Cheras Prima
- Puncak Widuri
- Taman Seri Banyan
- Taman Bukit Impian
- Taman Ramal Indah
- Taman Seri Ramal
- Kampung Sungai Ramal Luar
- Taman Sri Kenari
- Taman Jade Hills
- Taman Setia Impian
- Desa Karun Mas
- Taman Setia Balakong
- Taman Impian Ehsan
- Taman Impian Indah
- Apartment Green Park
- Taman Bukit Mas
- Taman Sinaran

ZONE 8

- Sungai Chua
- Taman Taming Maju
- Taman Cheras Jaya
- Taman Muhibbah
- Taman Cahaya
- Taman Cendana
- Taman Kota
- Taman Seri Saga
- Taman Desa Kekwa
- Taman Kajang Indah
- Taman Berjaya
- Taman Kajang Raya
- Taman Pinggiran
- Taman Desa Bunga Raya
- Taman Hijau
- Taman Sungai Chua
- Taman Seri Emas
- Taman Bidara
- Taman Berjaya Baru 2
- Taman Pasir Emas
- Taman Sepakat Indah
- Taman Koperasi LLN
- Taman Selamat
- Taman Setia
- Kampung Jambu
- KP Sungai Chua
- KP Kwan Tung
- KP Cheras Jaya

ZONE 9

- Taman Rakan
- Taman Seri Sungai Long
- Rumah Seri Kenangan Cheras
- Institusi Pengurusan Veterina
- Suria Villa
- Taman Bukit Suria
- Taman Suria
- Taman Cheras Idaman
- Taman Lingkaran Nur
- Taman Desa Baru
- Taman Koperasi Cuepacs
- Taman Desa Baru 2
- Taman Sri Sekamat
- Taman Kurnia Indah
- Desa Sutera

ZONE 10

- Taman Saujana Impian
- Taman Sekamat Indah
- Kampung Sungai Sekamat
- Taman Bayu Sekamat
- Taman Delima
- Desa Muhibah
- Taman Mesra
- Taman Impian Sejati
- Taman Impian Setia
- Taman Impian Indah
- Taman Impian Gemilang
- Taman Impian Makmur
- Taman Impian Murni
- Taman Bukit Palma
- Taman Saujana Damai
- Taman Impian Jaya
- Taman Impian Kasih
- Taman Impian Makmur 2

ZONE 11

- Bandar Sungai Long
- Taman Taming Indah
- Taman Taming Mutiara 3
- Taman Sejati
- Taman Bukit Sungai Long
- Bukit Enggang
- Taman Bukit Palma
- Kolej TAR

ZONE 12

- Sungai Lalang
- Taman Semenyih Impian
- Taman Semenyih Ria
- Taman Semenyih Permata
- Taman Sri Haneco
- KP Perindustrian Villaraya 1,2 & 3
- KP Perindustrian Hi-tech 1,2,4,5 & 6
- KP Perindustrian Sri Haneco
- Crest Hill Industrial Park
- Semenyih Integrated Industrial Park
- Kampung Pasir
- Kompleks Penjara Kajang
- Taman Saujana Damai
- Taman Puncak Saujana
- Taman Kantan Permai
- Taman Jenaris
- Taman Saujana Palma
- Taman Saujana Suria
- Taman Prima Saujana
- Taman Taming Impian
- Taman Pinggiran Saujana
- Taman Saujana Permai
- Mutiara Height

ZONE 13

- Taman Kajang Perdana
- Taman Jelok Impian
- Taman Semanja
- Good View Height
- TTDI Grove
- Taman Sri Sentosa
- Taman Sentosa
- Taman Jelok Ria
- Taman Sri Jelok
- Taman Sakap
- Taman Sri Damai
- Taman Restu
- Taman Kajang Ria
- Taman Villa Perdana
- Taman Asa Jaya
- Taman Vilaa Height
- Taman Maju
- Taman Bukit Cantik
- Taman Jelok Indah

ZONE 14

- Kampung Sungai Kantan
- Taman Melati
- Taman Saujana Emas
- Taman Saujana Mutiara
- Taman Saujana Villa
- Taman Angkasa Indah
- Taman Mulia
- Taman Megah
- Taman Berlian
- Taman Kajang Mulia
- Taman Kajang Baru
- Taman Ria
- Taman Bukit Ros
- Taman Intan
- Taman Seri Kantan
- Taman Seri Minang
- Taman Sungai Jelok
- Sentosa Height
- Taman Prima Saujana
- Taman Desa Impian
- Taman Kantan Permata

ZONE 15

- Bandar Kajang
- Taman Kajang Prima
- Taman Bukit Kajang Baru
- Taman Kajang Jaya
- Taman Bukit Ria
- Taman Bukit Mewah
- Taman Zamrud
- Taman Desa Seroja
- Taman Jasmin
- Taman Mahkota
- Taman Permai
- Taman Bukit Kenangan
- Taman Tiara Residence
- Taman Bukit Mutiara
- Taman Bukit
- Taman Sungai Mas
- Taman Jelita
- Taman Hijau
- Taman Reko Jaya
- Taman Sri Reko

ZONE 16

- Kampung Sungai Ramal Dalam
- KP Selaman Sek 10 Bandar Baru Bangi
- IKS, Seksyen 9 Bandar Baru Bangi
- Seksyen 9 Bandar Baru Bangi
- Seksyen 8 Bandar Baru Bangi
- Seksyen 7 Bandar Baru Bangi
- Pusat Bandar Bandar Baru Bangi
- Seri Wirani
- Taman Desa Surada
- Desa Dahlia
- Taman Teratai
- Taman Ramal Suria

ZONE 17

- Seksyen 1 Bandar Baru Bangi
- Seksyen 2 Bandar Baru Bangi
- Seksyen 3 Bandar Baru Bangi
- Seksyen 3 Tambahan Bandar Baru Bangi
- Seksyen 4 Bandar Baru Bangi
- Seksyen 4 Tambahan Bandar Baru Bangi
- Seksyen 13 Bandar Baru Bangi
- Seksyen 14 Bandar Baru Bangi
- Seksyen 15 Bandar Baru Bangi
- Seksyen 16 Bandar Baru Bangi
- ILKAP
- Bangi Golf Resort
- KP Bangi Seksyen 13 Bandar Baru Bangi
- Kampung Teras Jernang
- UNIKL
- Taman Wawasan
- Pangsapuri Sri Ayu
- Pangsapuri Anggun

ZONE 18

- Sungai Tangkas
- Taman Alam Sari
- Kajang Utama
- Kajang 2
- Nadayu 92
- Reko Sentral
- West Country, Seksyen 5 Bandar Baru Bangi
- Seri Langat, Seksyen 5 Bandar Baru Bangi
- Taman Tenaga
- KP Kajang
- Taman Universiti (Jalan Pintar)
- Taman Universiti (Jalan Cerdik)
- Taman Tropika
- Taman Tropika 2
- Taman Vista Emas
- Taman Reko Mutiara
- Kompleks Hentian Kajang
- Universiti Kebangsaan Malaysia
- German Malaysian Institute
- Bangi Avenue
- Taman Universiti Bangi
- Taman Bangi Indah
- Taman Bangi Villa
- Taman Bangi Ria
- Taman Idaman Bangi
- Kampung Bangi
- Kampung Bahagia
- Taman Lambaian Residence

ZONE 19

- Bandar Teknologi Kajang
- KP Bandar Teknologi Kajang
- Taman Bukit Mewah (Fasa 9)
- Taman Anggerik Villa
- Taman Anggerik Perdana
- Taman Anggerik Mas
- Taman Seri Baiduri
- Taman Baiduri Jaya
- Taman Industri Mega
- Taman Harmoni
- Tropicana Height
- Hillpark 1-4

ZONE 20

- Pekan Semenyih
- Kiara Plaza
- Kajang East
- Taman Semenyih Mewah Fasa 1-5
- Taman Bukit Semenyih
- Taman Semenyih Indah
- Taman Desa Kenanga
- Taman Desa Kenanga 2
- Taman Bunga Raya
- Rumah Murah PKNS
- Taman Semenyih Jaya
- Taman Gembira
- KP Sungai Purun
- KP Semtec
- Lekas 18
- Taman Raja Tun Uda
- Taman Dalma
- Taman Semenyih Permai
- Setia Ecohill
- Taman Desa Anggerik
- Taman Semenyih Baiduri
- Semenyih Sentral
- Kampung Baru Semenyih
- Taman Paling Jaya
- Semenyih Vista Valley
- Kampung Sireh

ZONE 21

- Taman Sunway Semenyih
- Taman Hiew Piow
- Taman Aik Ann
- Taman Sahabat
- Taman Desa Semenyih
- Taman Desa Mewah
- KP Kajang Jaya
- Kawasan Perniagaan Kiara
- Taman Tasik Semenyih
- Taman Seri Tanjung
- Kampung Tanjung
- Taman Semanggi
- Kampung Sentosa
- Tiara East
- Diamond City
- Taman Seri Impian
- Pekan Tarun
- Universiti Nottingham
- Taman Seri Segar
- Kampung Baru Semenyih
- Taman Mentari
- Taman Sempurna Jaya
- Taman Desa Haneco
- Taman Tenera Semenyih

ZONE 22

- Bandar Rinching
- Taman Mutiara Rinching
- Taman Pelangi Semenyih
- KP Bandar Rinching
- PGA Semenyih
- Taman Manikavasagam
- Tiara South
- Setia Mayuri

ZONE 23

- Bandar Tasik Kesuma
- KP Beranang
- KP Mahkota
- Perumahan PKNS Beranang
- Setia Ecohill 2
- Eco Majestic
- Pekan Beranang
- Kampung Sesapan Kelubi
- Kampung Sesapan Minangkabau
- Kampung Sesapan Batu Rembau
- Kampung Sungai Jai
- Kampung Kuala Pajam
- Kampung Jalan Enam Kaki
- Taman Pelangi Semenyih 2
- Semenyih Parklands
- Eco Forest

ZONE 24

- Bandar Sri Putra
- Bandar Bukit Mahkota
- Bandar Puteri Bangi
- Serene Height
- Kampung Sungai Kembong Hilir
- Kampung Rinching Hilir
- Taman Sungai Purun
- Taman Impian Putra

== See also ==
- List of local governments in Malaysia
