= Maluri =

Suburb in Cheras, Kuala Lumpur, Malaysia

Jalan Mahkota major commercial area of Maluri

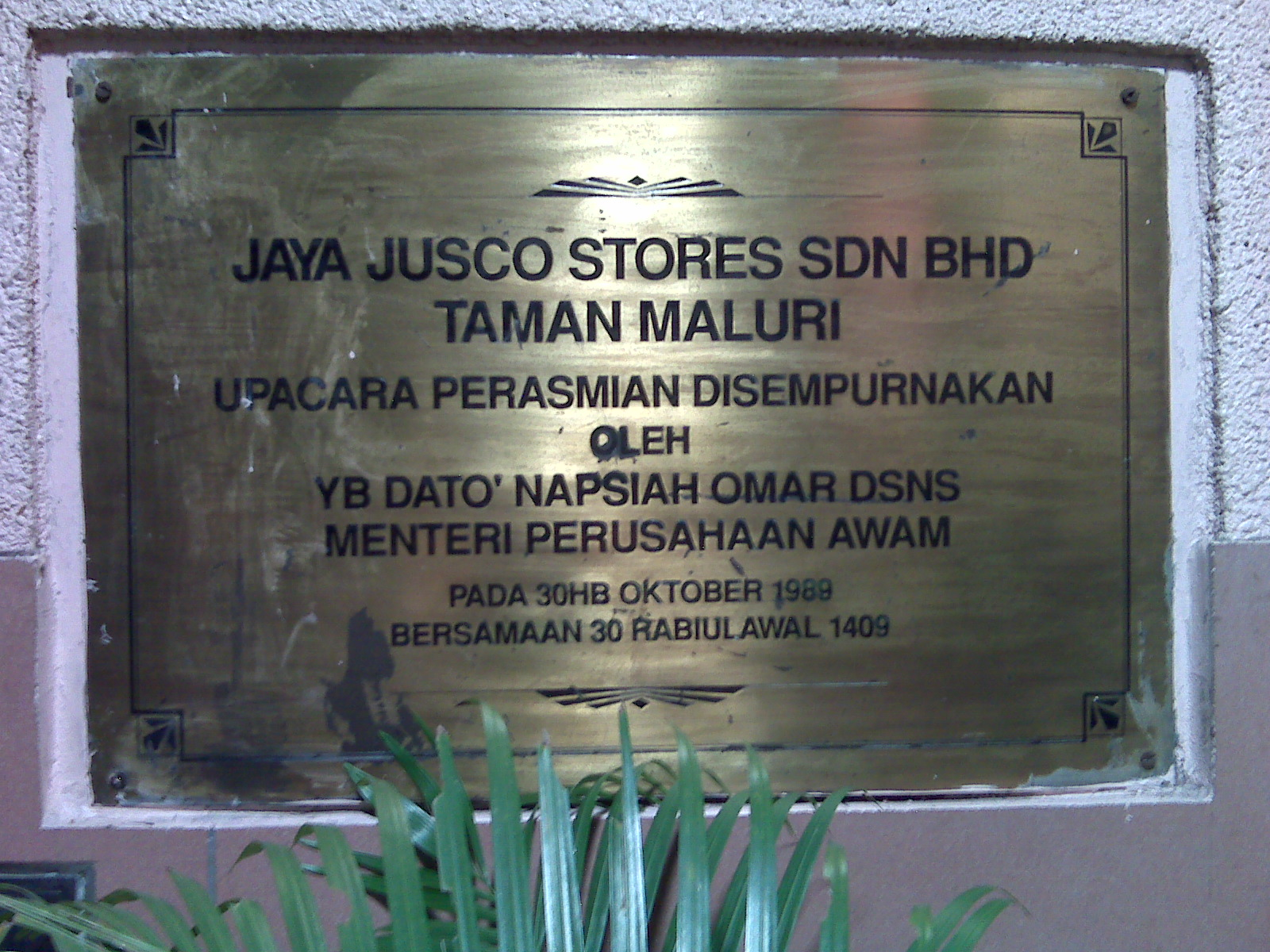
JUSCO Taman Maluri was opened on 30 October 1989. This plague was removed when the mall was enlarged in 2019

Maluri is a suburb in the constituency of Cheras, Kuala Lumpur, situated near the border of the constituency of Titiwangsa.

It is located along Cheras Road Federal Route 1 and can be accessed through Maluri station served by the LRT Ampang Line and the MRT Kajang Line. It is one of the housing areas closest to Kuala Lumpur's Golden Triangle.

== History ==
The name origin of Maluri is speculated to be from the acronym of "makanan luar negeri", which translated as oversea food in English. It is a part of the business ventures by Tun Daim in the district after the loss in his salt business.

== Location ==
Maluri is located close to the boundary between Cheras and Kuala Lumpur's central business district. It is adjacent to Kampung Pandan, Pandan Jaya and Cochrane Road. Across the Kerayong River is the development of Shamelin Perkasa.

== Education ==
Maluri houses a number of public, private and international schools, most notably Taylor's International School.

== Commercial activity ==
Maluri is the home of Aeon's (formerly JUSCO) oldest store in Malaysia, which opened on 30 October 1989. The store, like all other JUSCO stores in Malaysia, was rebranded as AEON in March 2012. Newer malls sprung up in the area in recent years, including Sunway Velocity Mall. IKEA's second store in Malaysia opened along Cochrane Road, just adjacent to Maluri.

== Access ==
=== Car ===
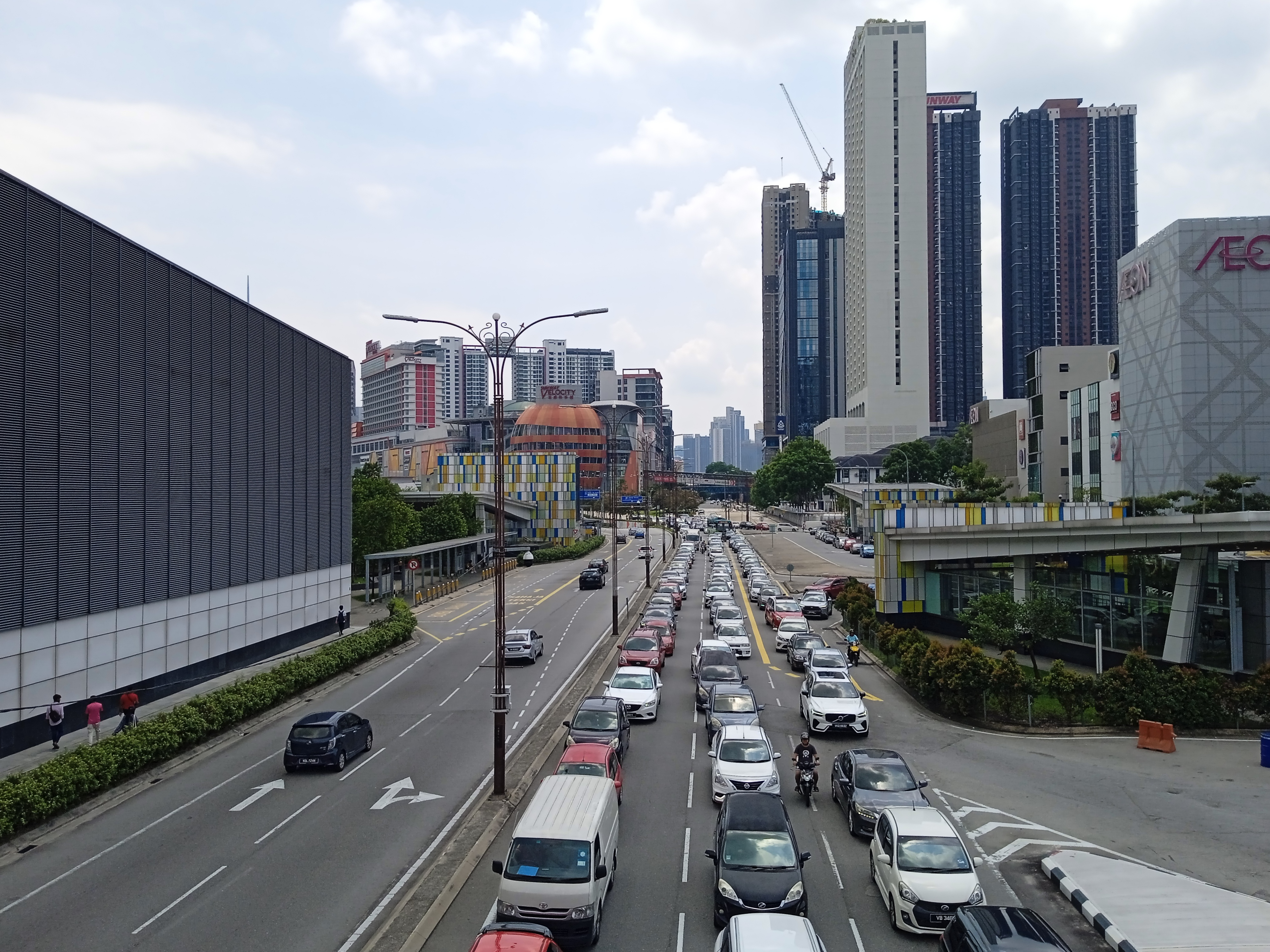
Cheras Road in Maluri from Maluri station footbridge

Maluri is located along Cheras Road, next to its interchange with Besraya Expressway. The area can also accessed via Cochrane Road, Jalan Perkasa and the MRR2 via Pandan Jaya.

=== Public transportation ===
Maluri lends its name to the Maluri station, served by both the LRT Ampang Line and the MRT Kajang Line. Cochrane MRT station is another MRT station located near the suburb.

Maluri is also an important rapidKL bus hub, with routes going as far as KLCC, Kajang and Titiwangsa.

== See also ==
- Cochrane Road
