= Kampung Malaysia =

Coordinates: 3°4′36″N 101°42′25″E

Kampung Malaysia is a small village in southern Kuala Lumpur, Malaysia.

== Location ==
It is surrounded, clockwise, by Bandar Tun Razak, Bandar Tasik Selatan, Sri Petaling and Salak Selatan.

The village consists of Kampung Malaysia Tambahan and Kampung Malaysia Raya; these villages are located in a non-Malay reserve land.

== Transportation ==
It is connected to Bandar Tasik Selatan integrated transportation terminal by a pedestrian bridge. The terminal consists of a railway station, LRT station, airport express station and a major bus hub.

Taman Naga Emas MRT station on the Putrajaya Line is located across the Besraya toll road.

Serving roads include the MRR 2 and Besraya toll road.
