= Shamelin Perkasa =

Township in Kuala Lumpur, Malaysia

Coordinates: 3.122385°N 101.737611°E

Shamelin Perkasa is a township in Kuala Lumpur, Malaysia. It is located between Maluri, Cheras and Pandan Indah, Selangor. Shamelin Perkasa is a mixed development of residential homes and commercial properties. Some of the amenities and facilities built in the area include a business park, recreational park for exercise and sports as well as educational entities.
