= ADNI =

Coordinates: 3.1588°N 101.757446°E

Sekolah Islam Adni
- Ampang; Malaysia

Information
- Type: Private
- Established: 1994
- Head teacher: -
- Website: adni.edu.my

Sekolah Islam Adni is a private Islamic school in Malaysia. It was established in 1994. The school prepares students for the international curriculum (IGCSE)* as well as the national curriculum (SPM) based on student choice. *IGCSE is only available for students born 2011 and before (for now).

Sekolah Islam Adni was set up in 1994 to provide an integrated* Islamic programme for children from Hadhonah (nursery) Raudhah (pre-school) Primary and Secondary levels. It is registered with the Malaysian Ministry of Education.

== More about Adni ==
- About ADNI https://www.youtube.com/watch?v=ORSyIOEHeok
- https://www.youtube.com/watch?v=-tW9gjwhIaI
