= Ampang Jaya Municipal Council =

Local authority in Selangor, Malaysia

Ampang Jaya Municipal Council Majlis Perbandaran Ampang Jaya
- Local Government Act 1976

Type
- Type: Municipal Council of Ampang Jaya

History
- Founded: 1 July 1992

Structure
- Political groups: Councillors: PKR (11); Amanah (7); DAP (6)

Motto
- Berbakti, Bersih, Berbudaya; Service, Clean, Cultural

Meeting place
- MPAJ Headquarters, Pandan Indah

Website
- www.mpaj.gov.my

Ampang Jaya Municipal Council (Malay: Majlis Perbandaran Ampang Jaya) is the local authority which administers Ampang Jaya of Selangor, Malaysia. It was founded on 1 July 1992, by combining the sub-districts (Mukim) of Ulu Klang and Ampang from the Gombak District Council (Majlis Daerah Gombak) (which is now known as Selayang Municipal Council) and Hulu Langat District Council (Majlis Daerah Hulu Langat) (now under Kajang Municipal Council) respectively.

== Current appointed councillors ==
=== 2021/2022 Session ===
No.	State Constituency	Zone No.	Member	Coalition (Party)
PKR 11 | AMANAH 7 | DAP 6
N18	Hulu Kelang	1	Mohamed Radziff Bin Hassan	PKR
N18	Hulu Kelang	2	Zafarull Ismail	PKR
N18	Hulu Kelang	3	Anfaal Saari	AMANAH
N18	Hulu Kelang	4	A. Yazid Bin Alias	AMANAH
N19	Bukit Antarabangsa	5	Rozmi Humaidi Zainal Abidin	PKR
N19	Bukit Antarabangsa	6	Awalluddin Shariff	PKR
N19	Bukit Antarabangsa	7	Abdul Latif Shaari	PKR
N19	Bukit Antarabangsa	8	Stella Pang Sock Fong	PKR
N20	Lembah Jaya	9	Mohd Anuar Mohd Yusof	AMANAH
N20	Lembah Jaya	10	Shamsul Ma’arif Bin Ismail	AMANAH
N20	Lembah Jaya	11	Ragunathan A/L Alages	PKR
N20	Lembah Jaya	12	Norsiah Md Hashim	PKR
N20	Lembah Jaya	13	Engku Faizan Azhar Che Engku Husin	AMANAH
N21	Pandan Indah	14	Ifwat Hamirudin	PKR
N21	Pandan Indah	15	Mohd Aris Ismail	AMANAH
N21	Pandan Indah	16	K. Thanabal Krishnan	AMANAH
N21	Pandan Indah	17	Woon Kwai Choong	PKR
N21	Pandan Indah	18	Vicknesvaran Jairaman	PKR
N22	Teratai	19	Megawati	DAP
N22	Teratai	20	Tan Swee Boon	DAP
N22	Teratai	21	R.Moganraj Renganathan	DAP
N22	Teratai	22	Chua Yew Chong	DAP
N22	Teratai	23	Mohammad Samot@Samat	DAP
N22	Teratai	24	Khek Man Kiat	DAP

== Responsibilities ==
As with most other local government bodies in Malaysia, Ampang Jaya Municipal Council is responsible for public health and sanitation, waste removal and management, city planning, environmental protection and building control, social and economic development and general maintenance of urban infrastructure.

== Headquarters ==
MPAJ's headquarters is located in Pandan Indah.

== Organisation chart ==
President:

Secretary: Ts. Hj. Hasrolnizam bin Shaari, SIS, AMS

== Departments ==
1. Jabatan Undang-undang (Law Department)
2. Jabatan Korporat dan Teknologi Maklumat (Corporate Planning Department)
3. Jabatan Khidmat Pengurusan (Management Department)
4. Jabatan Belia, Masyarakat dan Landskap (Youth and Community Department)
5. Jabatan Kejuruteraan (Engineering Department)
6. Jabatan Penilaian dan Pembangunan Hartanah (Valuing and Property Management Department)
7. Jabatan Perkhidmatan Bandar dan Kesihatan (Urban Services and Health Department)
8. Jabatan Perlesenan dan Pembangunan Usahawan
9. Jabatan Bangunan Dan Seni Bina
10. Jabatan Pengkuatkuasaan
11. Jabatan Hasil
12. Jabatan Perancang Bandar
13. Jabatan Perbendaharaan
14. Bahagian OSC Pembangunan
15. Bahagian Pengurusan Harta
16. Bahagian Integriti
17. Bahagian Pesuruhjaya Bangunan
18. Bahagian Penyelenggaraan Bangunan
19. Bahagian Ukur Bahan
20. Bahagian Pengurusan Harta
21. Bahagian Audit Dalam
22. Bahagian Perhubungan Awam dan Sekretariat

== Branch office ==
- Pandan Indah (for Hulu Langat District)
- Taman Melawati (for parts of Gombak District)

== Administration area ==
MPAJ covers the Ulu Klang mukim in Gombak region

MPAJ covers the Ampang mukim in Hulu Langat region.

MPAJ's town area covers Ampang town, and the adjacent town of Ulu Klang and Pandan Indah, as well as parts of Cheras.

ZONE 1

- Taman Melawati
- Kampung Klang Gate
- Taman Tropika Melawati
- Sunway Puncak Melawati
- Taman Prima Melawati
- Taman Nadayu
- Taman Bukit Melawati
- Taman Kuarza 16
- Taman Melawati Indah
- Kampung Fajar

ZONE 3

- Taman Lembah Keramat (AU5)
- Taman Seri Keramat Tengah (AU4)
- Taman Desa Keramat (AU3)
- Taman Sri Keramat (AU2)
- Taman Keramat Permai (AU1) (DUN Hulu Klang part)
- Kampung Dato Keramat Hujung
- Taman Bukit Baru
- Kampung Warisan
- Kampung Kuala Ampang
- Taman Sepakat
- Kampung Jelatik Park
- Taman Desa Pendidik

ZONE 2

- Taman Permata
- Taman Tiara Kemensah
- Taman Ukay Prima
- Taman Melati Indah
- Taman Pesona Villa
- Taman Bukit Kemensah
- Taman Zooview
- Taman Ulu Kelang
- Kampung Pasir
- Kampung Kemensah
- Taman Ar-ridhuan
- Taman Ukay Bistari
- Taman Desa Haras
- Taman Kemensah Height
- Taman Tropika Kemensah
- Taman Villa Kemensah
- Taman Kontur Kemensah
- Taman Puncak Kayangan Kemensah
- Taman Tiara Kemensah Rimba
- Taman Hevea Kemensah
- Taman Kemensah Mewah
- Taman Kemensah Indah
- Taman Nusa Tropika
- Taman Ukay Tropika
- Taman Ukay Seraya
- Taman Bayu Kemensah
- Taman Bukit Kemensah Indah
- Taman Tmn Bukit Palma Kemensah
- Taman Tijani Ukay

ZONE 4

- Taman Ukay Perdana
- Kampung Sungai Sering
- Taman Sering Ukay
- Taman Sierra Ukay
- Taman Riana Ukay
- Taman Ukay Indah
- Taman Ukay Spring

ZONE 5

- Taman Kelab Ukay
- Taman Bukit Mulia
- Taman Riverdale Park
- Taman Wangsa Ukay
- Taman Bukit Jaya
- Taman Bukit Utama
- Taman Bukit Mewah
- Taman Bukit Antarabangsa
- Taman Andaman Ukay
- Sinaran Ukay
- Taman Bukit Alam Ukay
- Wangsa Height
- Taman Siarah Oakleaf
- Kondo
- Taman Puncak Bukit Utama
- Taman Laman Oakleaf

ZONE 6

- Taman Villa Sri Ukay
- Taman Biverly Height
- Taman Sri Ukay
- Taman Highland
- Taman Dataran Ukay
- Taman Ukay Height
- Taman Hijau
- Taman Shuet Liang
- Taman Emas Ukay
- Taman Hill View
- Taman Bukit Jobina
- Taman Medan Damai Ukay
- Taman Pinggiran Ukay
- Ampang Point
- Taman Dataran Hillview

ZONE 7

- Hotel Flamingo
- Kampung Berembang Indah
- Taman Dato Keramat Tambahan
- Taman Keramat Permai (AU1) (DUN Bukit Antarabangsa part)

ZONE 8

- Taman Ampang Utama
- Taman Putra Sulaiman
- Taman Ampang Hilir
- Taman Dagang
- Taman Nirwana Fasa 2
- Taman D'suria Ampang
- Kampung Baru Ampang (Jalan 19,20,21)
- Pekan Ampang (DUN Bukit Antarabangsa part)
- Bandar Baru Ampang Fasa 1 (Spektrum)

ZONE 9

- Taman Dato Ahmad Razali
- Taman Ampang Jaya
- Taman Ampang Prima
- Taman Perwira
- Taman Uda Jaya
- Kampung Melayu Ampang Sri Tanjung
- Kampung Melayu Ampang
- Kampung Melayu Ampang Tambahan

ZONE 10

- Taman Ampang Indah
- Taman Bukit Indah
- Taman Lembah TTDI
- Taman Rasmi Jaya
- Taman Tun Abdul Razak

ZONE 11

- Ampang Waterfront
- Taman Bukit Ampang
- Taman Kesuma
- Taman Sri Ampang
- Taman Sri Wantan
- Taman KOSAS
- Kampung Tengah
- Taman Halaman

ZONE 12

- Kampung Pinggir
- Kampung Lembah Jaya Utara
- Kampung Lembah Jaya Selatan
- Kampung Muhibbah
- Kampung Bukit Sungai Seputeh
- Taman Mulia Jaya
- Kampung Pinggiran Selatan
- Taman Sri Intan
- Taman Dagang Jaya
- Taman Dagang Permai
- Taman Desa Lembah Permai
- Taman Industri Lembah Jaya

ZONE 13

- Kampung Ampang Indah Permai
- Kampung Tasek Permai
- Kampung Tasek Permai
- Taman Bukit Ampang Permai
- Taman Fairuza
- Taman Indah Jaya
- Taman Permai Jaya
- Taman Sri Bayu
- Taman Tasek Tambahan
- Sri Tmn Baru

ZONE 14

- Bandar Baru Ampang
- Kampung Ampang Campuran
- Kampung Baru Ampang (Jalan 3,4,5,6,7,9,10)
- Taman Ampang Mewah
- Taman Merdeka Villa
- Taman Pandan Ria
- Taman Pandan Ria III
- Taman Pandan Mesra
- Taman Seri Merdeka
- Taman Sri Merdeka
- Pekan Ampang (DUN Lembah Jaya part)

ZONE 15

- Taman Cempaka
- Taman Nirwana Fasa I
- Taman Dagang
- Taman Cahaya (Jalan Cahaya 3-13)
- Taman Bakti
- Taman Angsana Hilir (Food Court)
- Taman Pandan Utama
- Kampung Pandan Dalam
- Axis Pandan
- Taman Pandan Utama 2
- Pinggiran Cempaka (Bangunan)
- TPPT (Bangunan)

ZONE 16

- Taman Angsana Hilir
- Taman Dataran Pandan Prima
- Taman Pandan Jaya
- Kampung Perwira Jaya
- Kampung Pandan Luar
- Taman Bakti
- Pangsapuri Bayu Pandan Jaya
- Taman Angsana Hilir (Kondo & Teres)

ZONE 17

- Pandan Indah Industrial Park
- Kampung Baru Ampang Tambahan
- Kampung Baru Ampang (Jalan 12-14)
- Taman Industri Merdeka Ria
- Taman Pandan Ria II
- Taman Cahaya Indah
- Taman Pandan Cahaya
- Taman Cahaya (Main Road)

ZONE 18

- Taman Lembah Maju
- Taman Pandan Mewah
- Taman Muda (DUN Cempaka part)
- Taman Pandan Indah Business Park

ZONE 19

- Taman Pandan Indah
- Taman Kencana
- Taman Maju Jaya Fasa 3

ZONE 20

- Taman Pandan Perdana
- Taman Pandan Indah
- Taman Maju Jaya Fasa 1 & 2
- Taman Cheras Indah
- Taman Kencana Fasa 2

ZONE 21

- Taman Kencana
- Taman Cheras Baru
- Taman Mawar
- Taman Mastika
- Taman Bukit Permai Industri
- Taman Pinggiran Cheras
- Kampung Cheras Baru
- Taman Bukit Pandan
- Taman Bukit Pandan Bestari

ZONE 22

- Taman Putra Selangor
- Taman Seraya
- Taman Muda (DUN Teratai part)
- Taman Mawar

ZONE 23

- Taman Mega Jaya
- Taman Melor
- Taman Saga
- Taman Bukit Teratai
- Taman Seraya
- Taman Bukit Permai 2

ZONE 24

- Taman Bukit Segar Jaya
- Taman Bukit Segar
- Taman Cheras Hartamas
- Taman Bukit Pandan
