= Kampung Desa Serdang =

Human settlement in Malaysia

Coordinates: 03°00′47″N 101°43′42″E

Kampung Desa Serdang is a small village in Serdang, Selangor, Malaysia. This village can be seen from the Sungai Besi Expressway and North–South Expressway Southern Route.
