= Jalan Cochrane, Kuala Lumpur =

Road and district in Kuala Lumpur, Malaysia

Cochrane Road is a road and a suburb in the Titiwangsa constituency of Kuala Lumpur, Malaysia. It was named after Charles Walter Hamilton Cochrane (1876–1932), who served as British Resident of Perak (1929–1930) and later the Chief Secretary to the Government of the Federated Malay States from 1930 till his death in 1932.

== Location ==
Cochrane Road runs in a northwest–southeast direction, linking Maluri to Pasar Road in Pudu.

== Features ==
Cochrane Road lends its name to two secondary schools in this area - the Cochrane Road School and SMK Cochrane Perkasa.

Since 2015, Cochrane Road hosts IKEA's second store in Malaysia after Mutiara Damansara. Linked to the IKEA store is the MyTown Shopping Centre, developed by the army-linked Boustead Group.

There were many government quarters in this area since the 1930s, until demolition in 2011-2012 to make way for the construction of the IKEA store and the Cochrane MRT station, part of the MRT Kajang Line.
