= Cahaya LRT station =

Railway station in Ampang Jaya, Malaysia

AG17 Cahaya
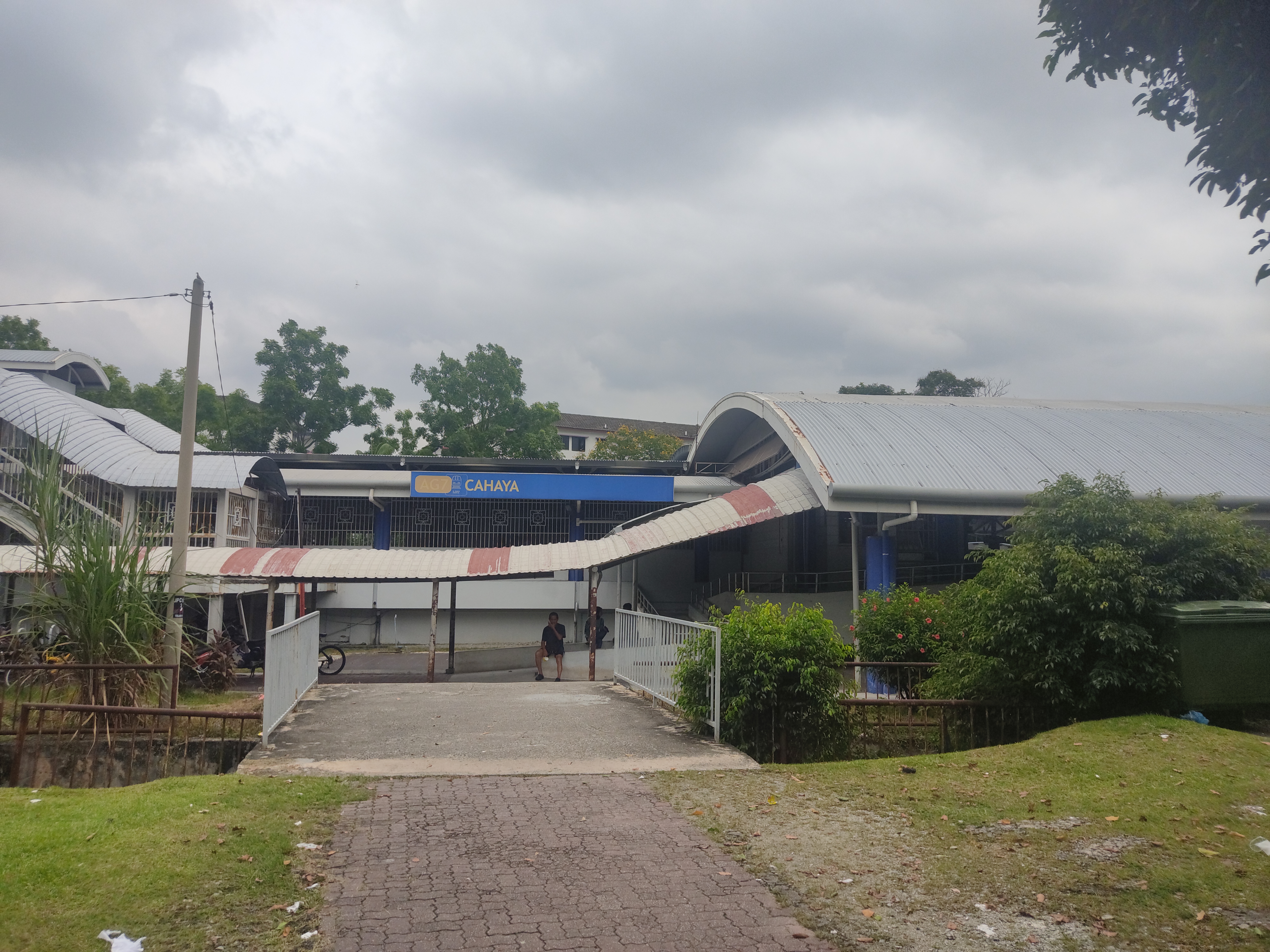
- Station exterior

General information
- Other names: Malay: چهاي (Jawi); Chinese: 丽阳; Tamil: சகாயா
- Location: Off Jalan Cahaya 7, Taman Cahaya Indah and Jalan Pandan Cahaya 1/2, Pandan Indah; 68000 Ampang; Selangor; Malaysia
- Coordinates: 3°8′26″N 101°45′23″E
- System: Rapid KL
- Owner: Prasarana Malaysia
- Operator: Rapid Rail
- Line: 3 Ampang Line
- Platforms: 2 side platforms
- Tracks: 2

Construction
- Structure type: Low-rise
- Parking: Available. Free parking bays.

Other information
- Station code: AG17

History
- Opened: 16 December 1996; 29 years ago

Services
Preceding station		Following station
Cempaka towards Sentul Timur	Ampang Line	Ampang Terminus
Location

The Cahaya LRT station is a Malaysian low-rise light rapid transit (LRT) station situated near and named after the nearby Taman Cahaya neighbourhood in Ampang, Selangor. The station is part of the LRT Ampang Line (formerly known as STAR LRT line and was opened on 16 December 1996, as part of the first phase of the STAR LRT system's opening, alongside 13 adjoining stations along the Sultan Ismail-Ampang route.

== Location ==
Cahaya station is named after the Ampang Jaya locality of Taman Cahaya, and is stationed in an area bordering the suburbs of Pandan Indah towards the south, and Taman Cahaya and Taman Cahaya Indah (Lovely Cahaya Estate) towards the north. The station is also accessible from Taman Nirvana (Nirvana Estate) north and Kampung Baru Ampang (Ampang New Village) south. The station is linked to two roadways: One backroad off Jalan Cahaya 7 (Cahaya Road 7) from Taman Cahaya Indah and another off Jalan Pandan Cahaya 1/2 (Pandan Cahaya Road 1/2) from Pandah Indah.

The Cahaya station was constructed along two levelled tracks, reusing the now-defunct Federated Malay States Railway (FMSR) and Keretapi Tanah Melayu (KTM) route between Kuala Lumpur, Ampang and Salak South. The station is also located a mere 470 metres away from the neighbouring Cempaka station, which serves roughly the same locality.

== See also ==
- List of rail transit stations in Klang Valley
