= Pandan Indah =

Human settlement in Malaysia

Coordinates: 3.1303785°N 101.750312°E

Town Park Pandan Indah

Pandan Indah (Jawi: ڤندن اينده; Chinese: 班登英达) is a major township in Ampang, Kuala Lumpur, Malaysia. It is located between Ampang proper and Cheras.

Pandan Indah has the basic facilities of a modern Malaysian township - it has a police station, a fire station, a primary and a secondary school and two neighbourhood shopping malls - Pandan Kapital and MidPoint Shopping Complex.

== Facilities ==
- Ampang Jaya Municipal Council (MPAJ) main headquarters
- Balai Polis Pandan Indah
- Balai Bomba Pandan Indah
- Taman Rekreasi Pandan Indah
- Pangsapuri Hospital Ampang
- Hospital Ampang

== Education ==
- Sekolah Kebangsaan Pandan Indah
- Sekolah Menengah Kebangsaan Pandan Indah

== Transport ==
=== Public transport ===
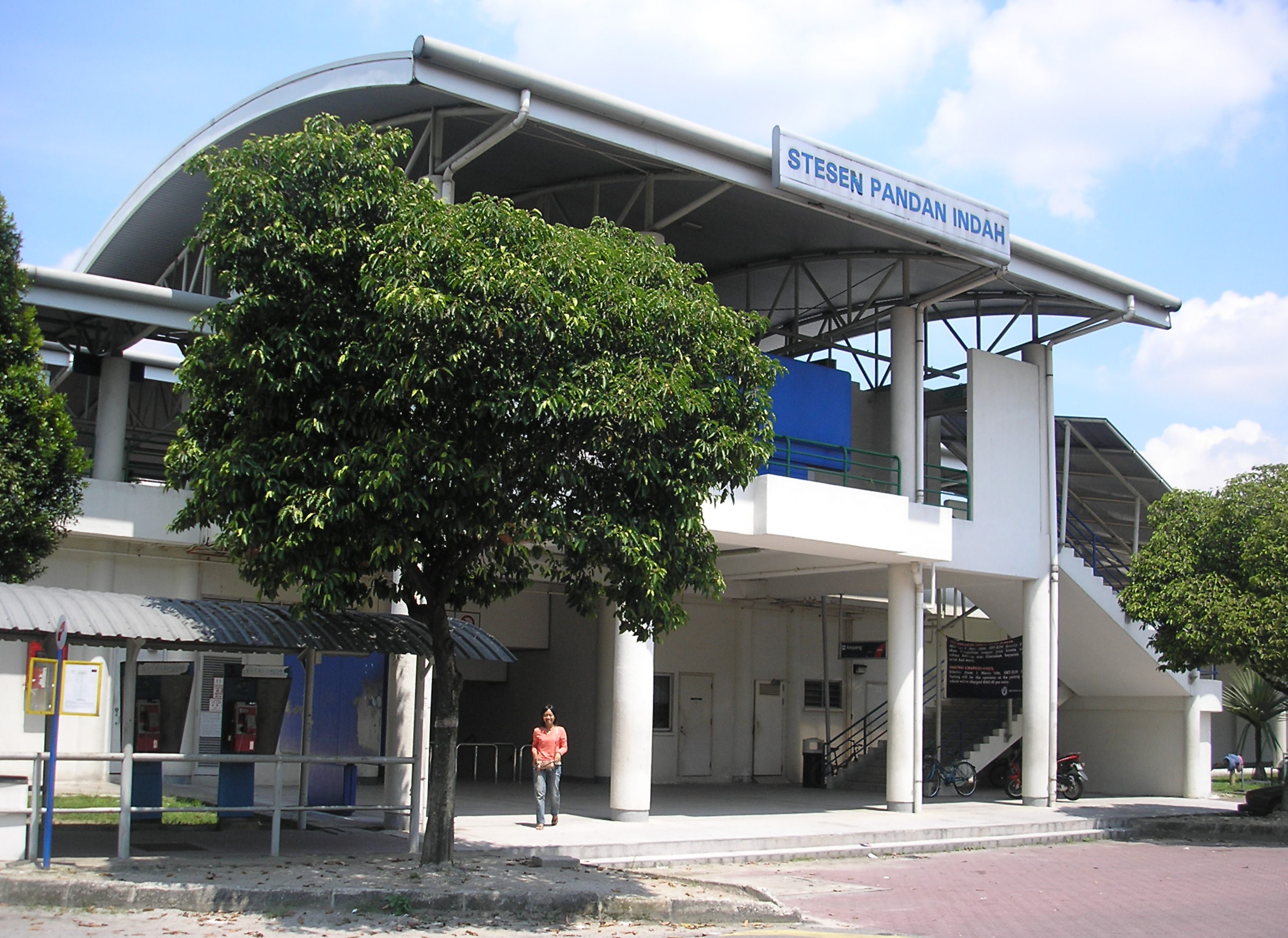
An exterior view of the Pandan Indah LRT station of the Ampang Line, Selangor, Malaysia

Though named as such, the Pandan Indah LRT station does not directly serve Pandan Indah. The Cempaka station is much closer.

=== Car ===
Pandan Indah is well connected with other towns in Selangor and Kuala Lumpur. The MRR2 Federal Route 28 runs through the western flank of Pandan Indah, linking it with Ampang, Ulu Klang as well as Cheras and Sri Petaling. Also, the extension of the Besraya Expressway which opened in July 2014 reduced travelling time from Ampang and Pandan Indah districts to downtown Kuala Lumpur, Sungai Besi and Petaling Jaya.

== Politics ==
Pandan Indah is part of the Pandan parliamentary constituency, currently represented by Rafizi Ramli of PH-PKR.

On the state level, Pandan Indah straddles two state seats - Cempaka and Teratai. Following a 2016 re-delineation exercise, Pandan Indah is set to become its own state constituency, succeeding the current Cempaka state constituency.
