= Cempaka LRT station =

Railway station in Ampang Jaya, Malaysia

AG16 Cempaka
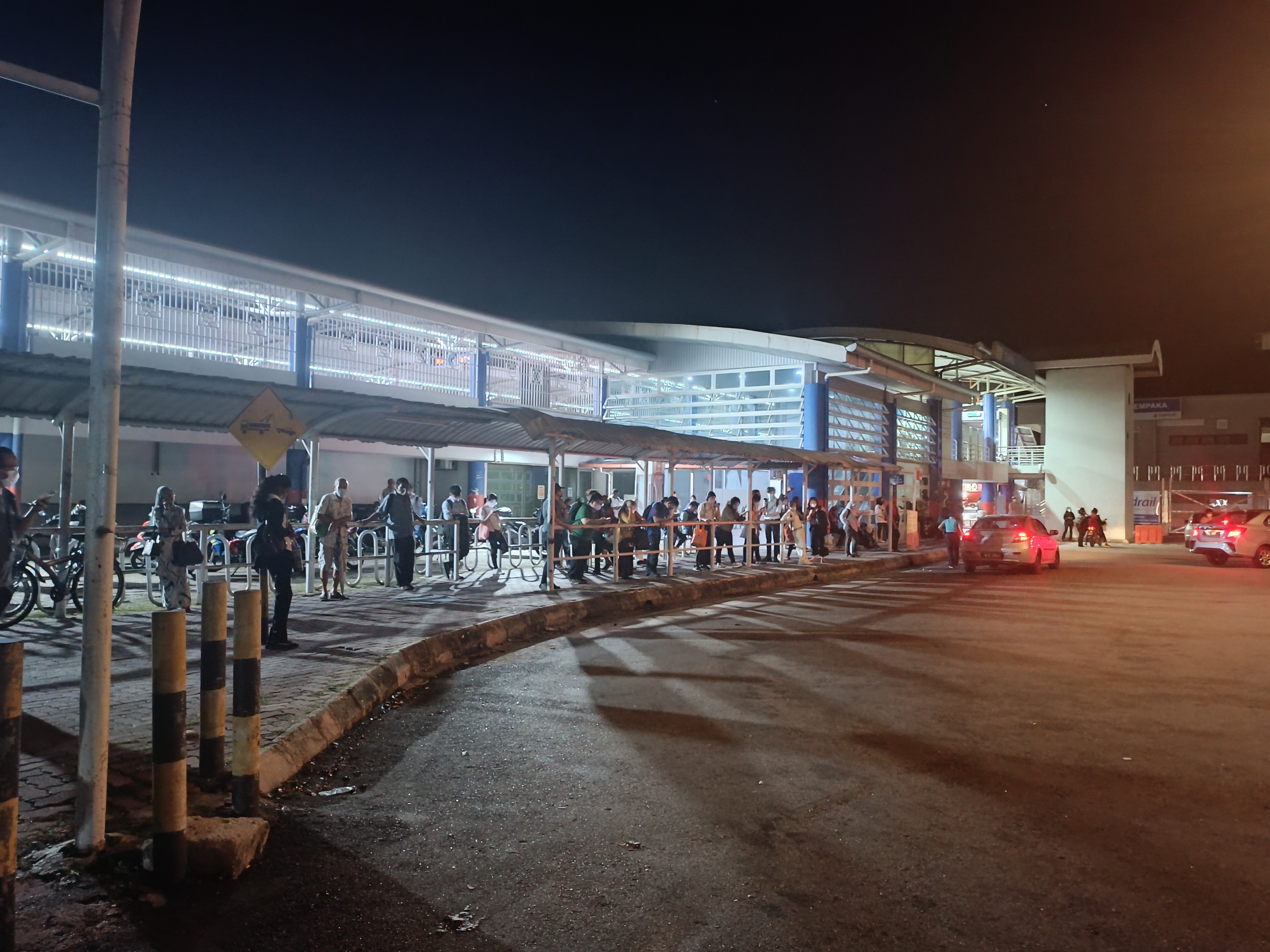
- Station exterior from Off Jalan Cempaka

General information
- Other names: Malay: چمڤاک (Jawi); Chinese: 千百家; Tamil: செம்பாக்கா
- Location: Off Jalan Cempaka and Jalan Pandan Indah 6/1, Pandan Indah; 55100 Ampang; Selangor; Malaysia
- Coordinates: 3°8′18″N 101°45′10″E
- System: Rapid KL
- Owner: Prasarana Malaysia
- Operator: Rapid Rail
- Line: 3 Ampang Line
- Platforms: 2 side platforms
- Tracks: 2

Construction
- Structure type: Low-rise
- Parking: Available with payment. 298 total parking bays.

Other information
- Station code: AG16

History
- Opened: 16 December 1996; 29 years ago

Services
Preceding station		Following station
Pandan Indah towards Sentul Timur	Ampang Line	Cahaya towards Ampang
Location

The Cempaka LRT station is a Malaysian low-rise light rapid transit (LRT) station situated near and named after the nearby Taman Cempaka neighbourhood, in Ampang Jaya, Selangor. The station is part of the LRT Ampang Line (formerly known as STAR LRT line) and was opened on 16 December 1996, as part of the first phase of the STAR LRT system's opening, alongside 13 adjoining stations along the Sultan Ismail-Ampang route.

== Location ==
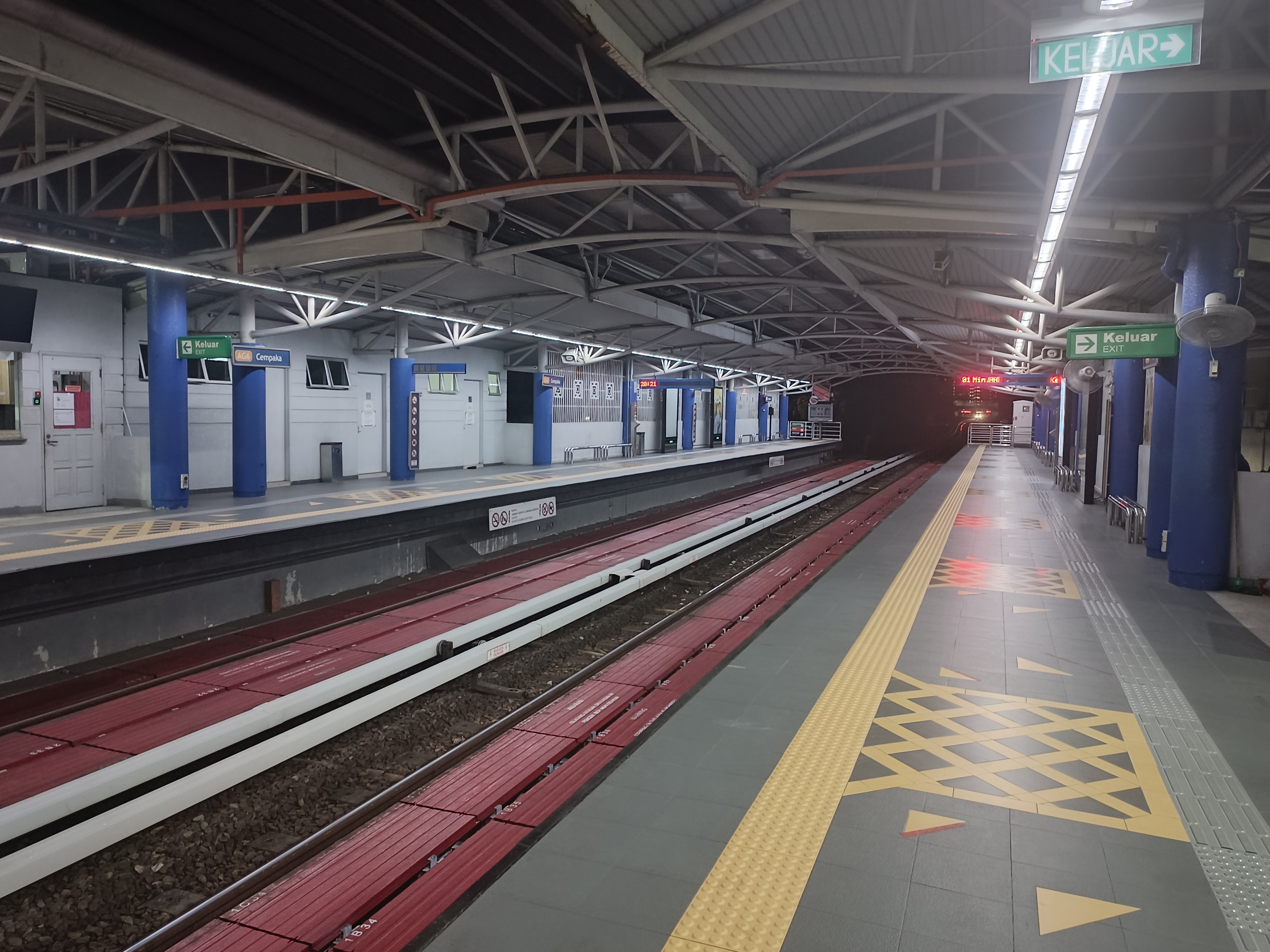
Platform at the station, in 2023

The station is situated east of and named after the Ampang Jaya locality of Taman Cempaka to the southeast, and is within walking distance of Kampung Pandan Dalam directly north from the station, and Pandan Indah to the south. The station is accessible from two branch roads, one off Jalan Cempaka from the north and another off Jalan Pandan Indah 6/1.

The station was constructed along two leveled tracks, reusing the now defunct Federated Malay States Railway (FMSR) and Keretapi Tanah Melayu (KTM) route between Kuala Lumpur, Ampang and Salak South. The station is also located a mere 470 metres away from the neighbouring Cahaya station, which serves roughly the same locality.

== Bus Service ==
Route No.	Destination
T350	AG16 Cempaka - Tasek Tambahan via Pandan Mewah
T351	AG16 Cempaka - Taman Bukit Permai via Pandan Indah
AJ03	AG16 Cempaka - Taman Bukit Teratai (SK Bukit Teratai) via Pandan Indah (Operated by Smart Selangor)

AJ04 also passes by the station by having a stop near Kenari Court Apartment.

== See also ==
- List of rail transit stations in Klang Valley
