= Pandan Indah LRT station =

Metro station in Kuala Lumpur, Malaysia

AG15 CC20 Pandan Indah
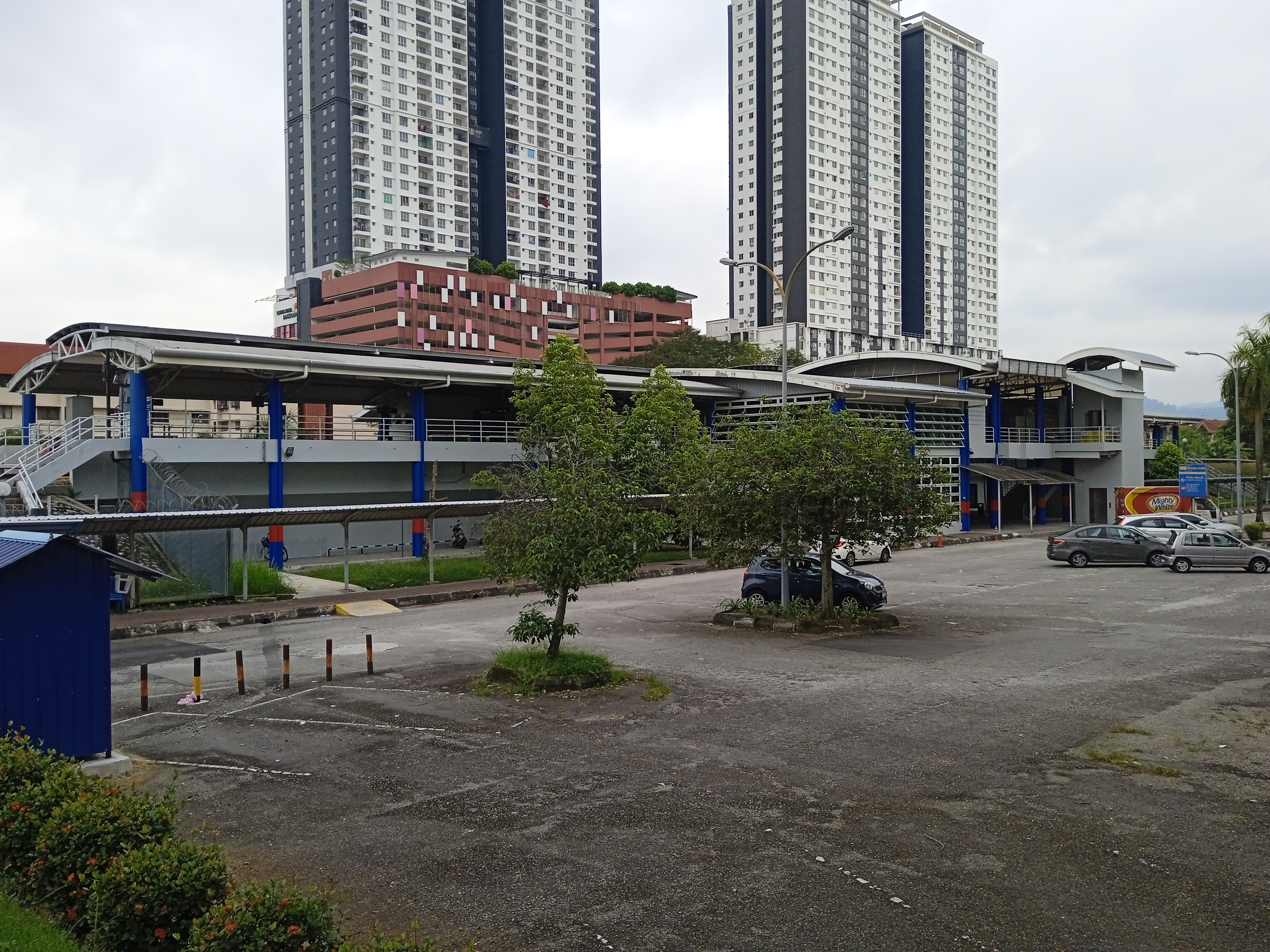
- An exterior view of the station, as seen towards the south.

General information
- Other names: Malay: ڤندن اينده (Jawi); Chinese: 班登英达; Tamil: பாண்டான் இண்டா
- Location: Off Jalan Cempaka and Jalan Pandan Indah 22, Pandan Indah, 55100 Ampang; Selangor; Malaysia
- Coordinates: 3°8′4″N 101°44′47″E
- System: Rapid KL
- Owner: Prasarana Malaysia (LRT); MRT Corp (MRT)
- Operator: Rapid Rail
- Lines: 3 Ampang Line; 13 Circle Line (future)
- Platforms: 2 side platforms
- Tracks: 2

Construction
- Structure type: Low-rise
- Parking: Available with payment. 230 total parking bays.

Other information
- Station code: AG15 CC20

History
- Opened: 16 December 1996; 29 years ago (LRT)
- Opening: 2032; 6 years' time (MRT)

Services
Preceding station		Following station
Pandan Jaya towards Sentul Timur	Ampang Line	Cempaka towards Ampang
Taman Kencana Clockwise / outer	Circle Line Future service	Kampung Pandan Anticlockwise / inner
Location

Pandan Indah LRT station is a Malaysian low-rise light rapid transit (LRT) station situated near and named after Pandan Indah, in Ampang, Selangor. The station, served by the LRT Ampang Line (formerly known as STAR LRT Line), was opened on 16 December 1996, as part of the first phase of the STAR LRT system's operations, alongside 13 adjoining stations along the Sultan Ismail-Ampang route.

The station shares a similar name with the neighbouring Pandan Jaya station 1 kilometre southwest.

The station is planned as a future interchange with the upcoming MRT Circle Line of the KVMRT project.

== Location ==
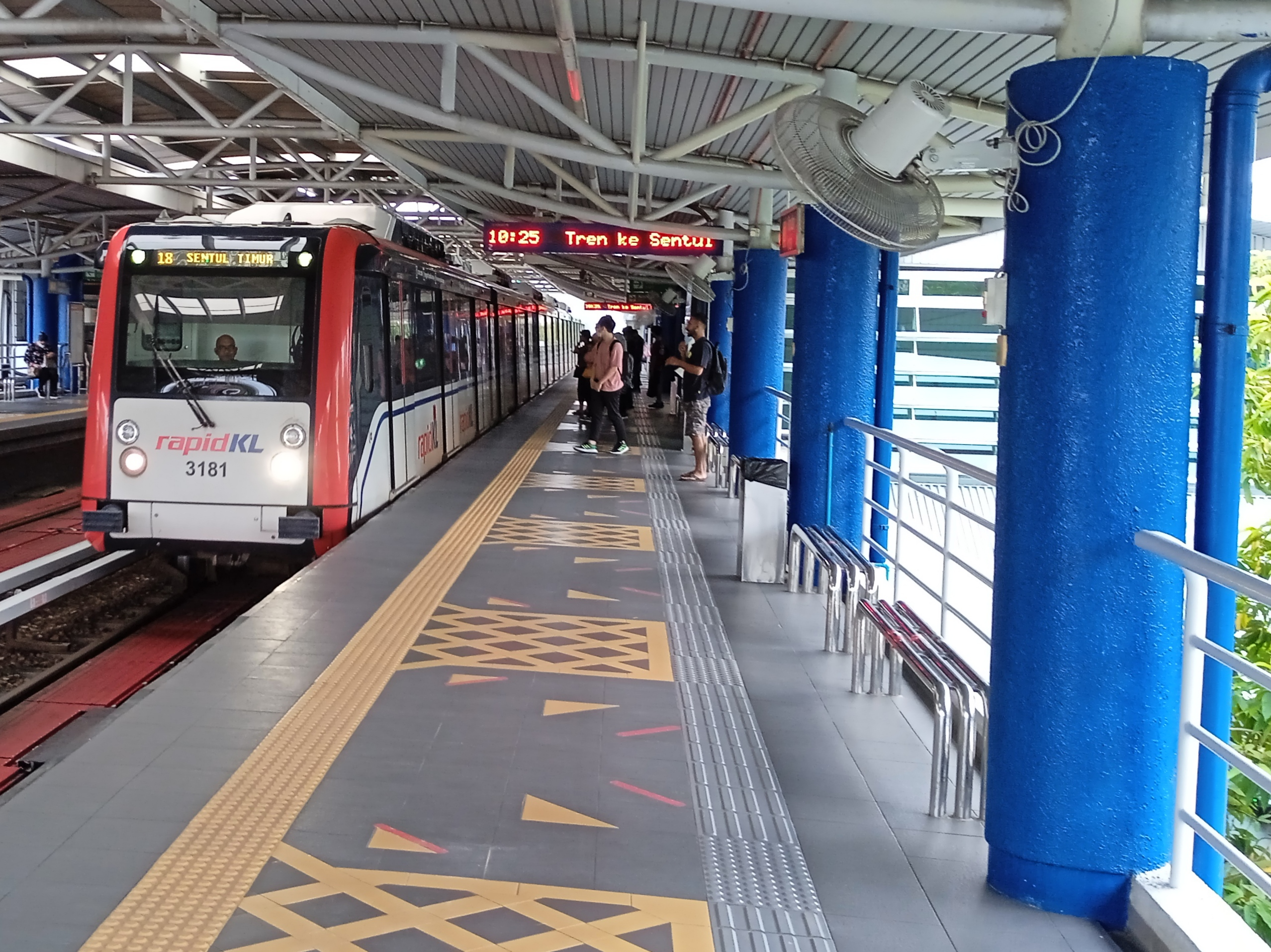
Platform at the station bound to Sentul Timur LRT station, in 2022

The station is situated next to and named after the Ampang Jaya locality of Pandan Indah to the southeast, and is within walking distance of Taman Bakti directly beside the station, and Taman Cempaka and the eastern edges of Pandan Jaya to the north. The station is directly accessible from the north through a flats complex off Jalan Cempaka, while the station is open to Pandan Indah via Jalan Pandan Indah 22, a branch road from the main thoroughfare of Jalan Pandan Indah.

The station was constructed along two levelled tracks, reusing the now defunct Federated Malay States Railway (FMSR) and Keretapi Tanah Melayu (KTM) route between Kuala Lumpur, Ampang and Salak South.

== Nearby station ==
- Axis Atrium

== See also ==
- List of rail transit stations in Klang Valley
