= Ampang Jaya =

Ampang
- Town
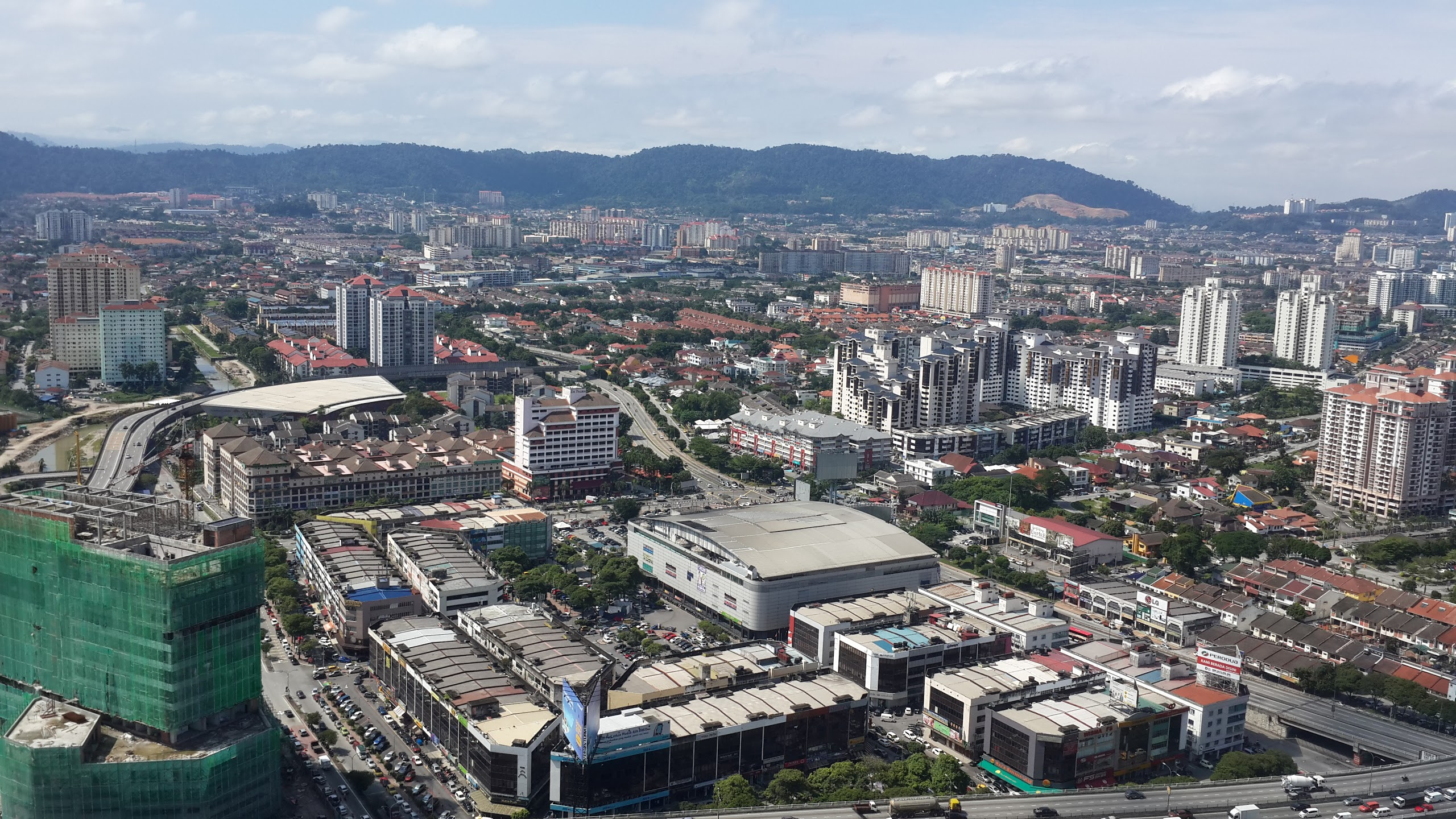

- Seal
- Motto: Berbakti, Bersih, Berbudaya; Service, Clean, Cultural
- Location within Malaysia
- Coordinates: 3°9′0″N 101°46′12″E
- Country: Malaysia
- State: Selangor
- Granted Municipal Status: 1 July 1992

Government
  - Type: Local government
  - Body: Ampang Jaya Municipal Council
  - President: DR. ANI BINTI AHMAD

Area
  - Total: 143.5 km^{2} (55.4 sq mi)

Population (2020)
  - Total: 781,089
  - Density: 3,711/km^{2} (9,610/sq mi)
- Time zone: UTC+8 (MST)
  - Summer (DST): Not observed
- Postcode: 68000 (Ampang, Kemensah); 55100 (Pandan Jaya, Pandan Indah); 55300 (Pandan Perdana); 53100 (Melawati, Klang Gates); 53300 (Taman Permata); 54200 (Keramat AU1-AU5); 56100 (Cheras Indah, Bukit Teratai)
- Calling code: +60-3-42, +60-3-41, +60-3-92
- Website: http://www.mpaj.gov.my

Ampang Jaya, more commonly known as just Ampang, is a town, a mukim and a parliamentary constituency straddling parts of the Hulu Langat District and Gombak District, in eastern Selangor, Malaysia. It is located just outside the eastern border of Kuala Lumpur Federal Territory.

It is administered by the Ampang Jaya Municipal Council (MPAJ), which is the formal name of the township as well.

== History ==
Kuala Lumpur was founded in 1857 at the confluence of the Sungei Lumpur (now Gombak River) and the Klang River, which now houses the Kuala Lumpur Jamek Mosque. Before the arrival of the Chinese for tin mining, Kuala Lumpur was a small hamlet with only several shops and houses. Raja Abdullah, who is also the representative of the Sultan in Klang, and Raja Juma'at of Lukut sent 87 Chinese miners from Lukut in 1857 to open tin mines in Ampang, thus beginning the development of Kuala Lumpur. Ampang was one of the earliest areas in the Klang Valley to be opened for tin mining. The name "Ampang" derives from the old spelling of the Malay word empangan (or ampangan), meaning dam; the place was named in reference to the miners' dams. A road was built to connect Ampang to Kuala Lumpur which is today Jalan Ampang.

Between colonial rule and February 1974, Ampang district was part of the greater Kuala Lumpur district in Selangor. Following the creation of the Federal Territory of Kuala Lumpur on 1 February 1974, Ampang district was split into two; the western part, located within the Federal Territory, became Ampang Hilir, and the eastern part, remained in Selangor, as part of Hulu Langat (Kajang) District.

During the height of the Malayan Emergency in the 1950s, the British established the Ampang New Village, which became one of the largest Chinese settlements in the Klang Valley. The Kau Ong Yah Lam Thian Kiong Temple (安邦南天宮) in Ampang New Village is famous for the Nine Emperor Gods festival, which is celebrated annually on the 9th month of the Chinese lunar calendar, between late-September and early-October.

Evolution of Ampang Jaya since 1977

On 1 July 1992, the Gombak District Council (Majlis Daerah Gombak) and the Hulu Langat District Council (Majlis Daerah Hulu Langat) respectively ceded the districts of Ulu Klang and Ampang, forming the Ampang Jaya Municipal Council.

One block of the Highland Towers, located within Ampang Jaya's territory, collapsed on 11 December 1993.

On 16 December 1996, Malaysia's first metro line, the LRT Ampang Line, opened for service.

== Geography ==
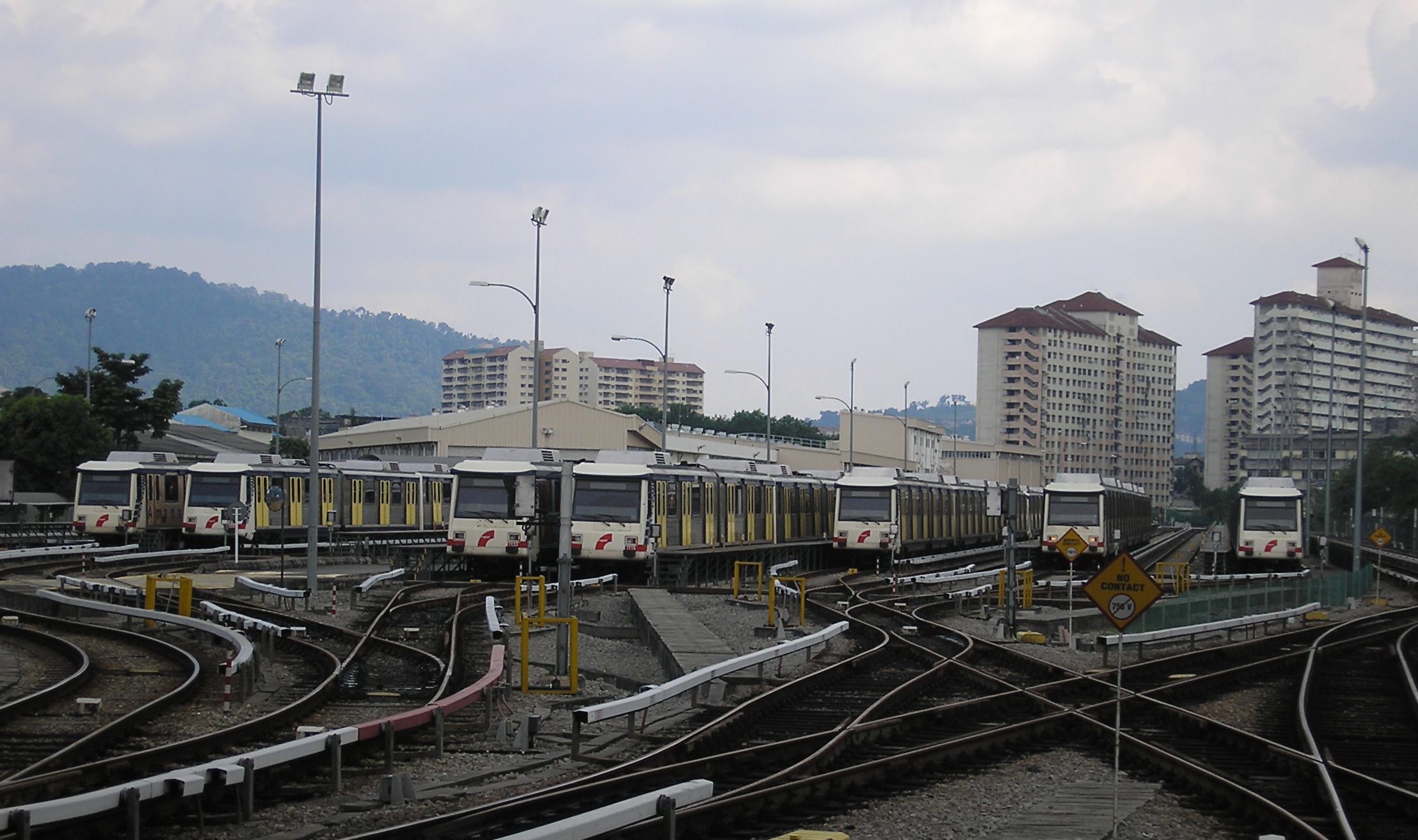
Ampang metro line depot, showing the old trains

Situated to the east of Kuala Lumpur, Ampang Jaya covers an area of 143.5 km^{2}, covering the parliamentary constituencies of Ampang, Pandan and Gombak, and stretches from Pandan Indah from the south, through Ampang town, Hulu Klang, Melawati, and touching the Klang Gates Dam in the north.

Clockwise, Ampang Jaya borders the remainder of Hulu Langat District in the east and south, the Federal Territory of Kuala Lumpur in the west, Gombak District in the north, and a short border with Bentong (Pahang) in the northeast.

== Demographics ==
Ethnic breakdown of Ampang Jaya as of 2020
1. Malay (50.9%)
2. Chinese (26.1%)
3. Indian (6.00%)
4. Other ethnicities (9.20%)
5. Non-Malaysians (7.80%)

Ampang is known for its diverse ethnic makeup. Data shows that 50.9% of Ampang Jaya's residents are Malays, while the Chinese make up about 26.1%. Indians make up 6%, while the remainder is made up of other ethnicities, nationalities and expatriates.

== Culture ==
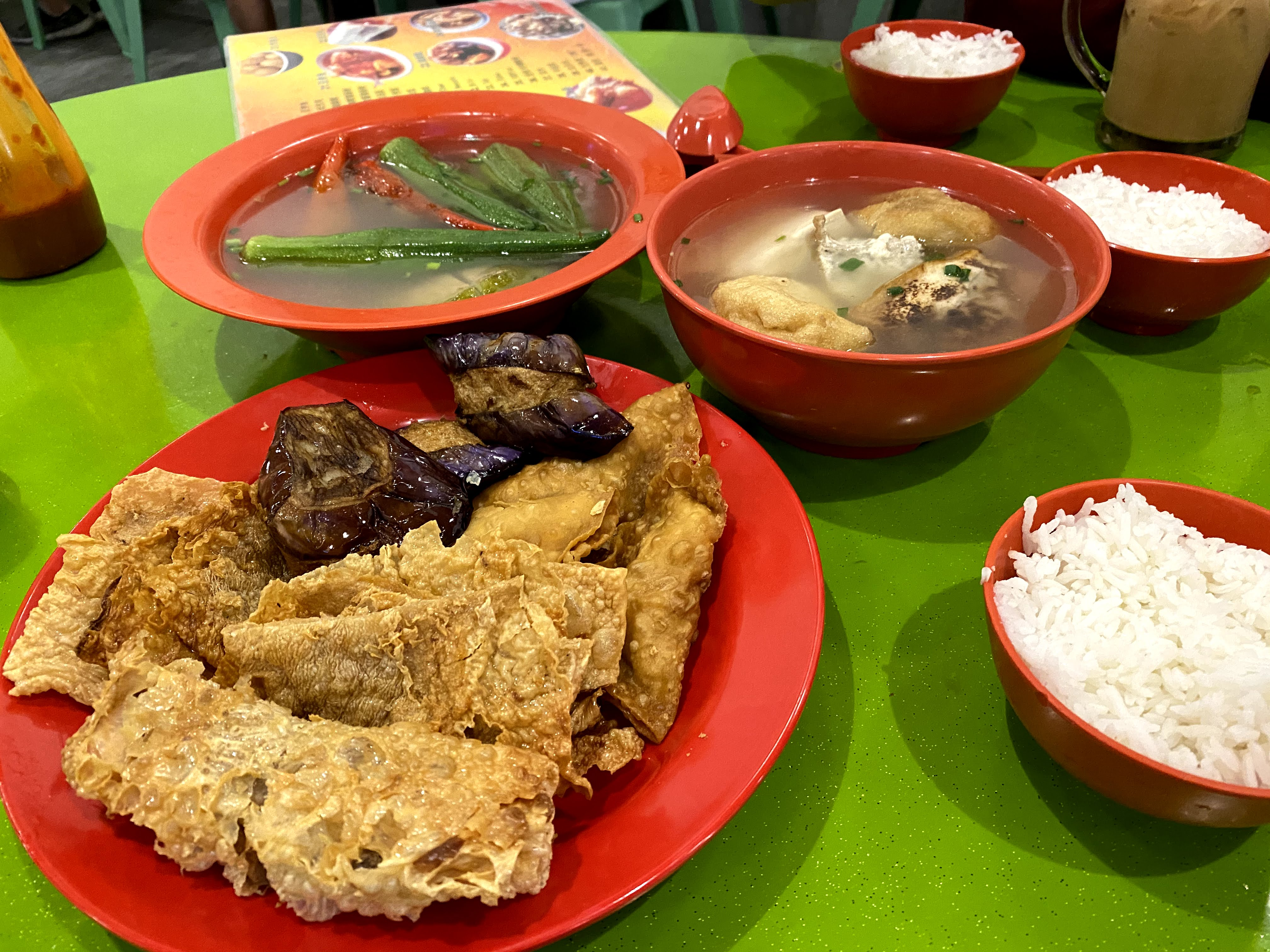
Ampang yong tau foo

Ampang is famous for yong tau foo, a stuffed bean curd dish of Hakka origin.

== Education ==
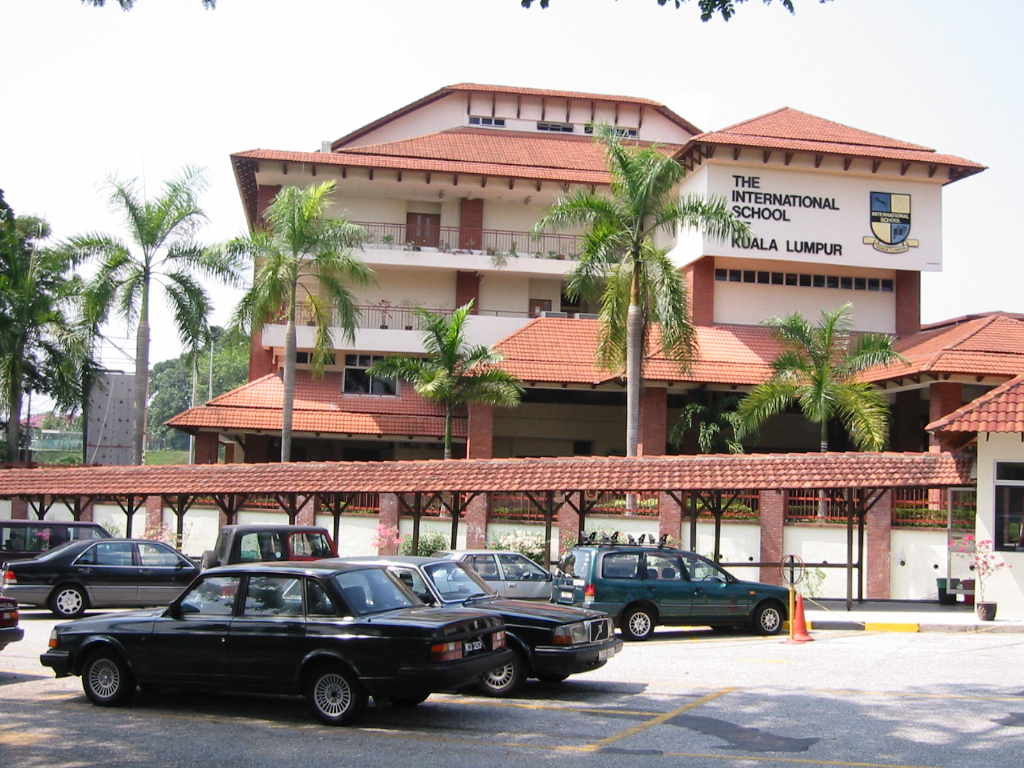
International School of Kuala Lumpur (ISKL) secondary campus

The former International School of Kuala Lumpur (ISKL) secondary campus is in Ampang. The ADNI Islamic school is also based in the town.

=== List of Schools in Ampang Jaya ===
==== Primary Schools ====
- Sekolah Kebangsaan Ampang
- Sekolah Kebangsaan Ampang Campuran
- Sekolah Kebangsaan Cheras Indah
- Sekolah Kebangsaan (1) Kuala Ampang
- Sekolah Kebangsaan (2) Kuala Ampang
- Sekolah Kebangsaan Pandan Indah
- Sekolah Kebangsaan Pandan Perdana
- Sekolah Kebangsaan Taman Bukit Indah
- Sekolah Kebangsaan Taman Keramat
- Sekolah Kebangsaan Taman Kosas
- Sekolah Kebangsaan Taman Bukit Teratai
- Sekolah Kebangsaan Taman Muda
- Sekolah Kebangsaan Taman Melawati
- Sekolah Kebangsaan Taman Nirwana
- Sekolah Jenis Kebangsaan (Cina) On Pong
- Sekolah Jenis Kebangsaan (Cina) On Pong 2
- Sekolah Jenis Kebangsaan (Cina) Kampung Baru Ampang
- Sekolah Jenis Kebangsaan (Cina) Choon Hwa Pandan
- Sekolah Kebangsaan Taman Tasik

(Counted with Pandan Area schools,including Pandan Indah and Taman Muda)

==== Secondary School ====
- Sekolah Menengah Kebangsaan Bandar Baru Ampang
- Sekolah Menengah Kebangsaan Bukit Indah
- Sekolah Menengah Kebangsaan Hulu Klang
- Sekolah Menengah Kebangsaan Pandan Indah
- Sekolah Menengah Kebangsaan Pandan Jaya
- Sekolah Menengah Kebangsaan Pandan Mewah
- Sekolah Menengah Kebangsaan Taman Melawati
- Sekolah Menengah Kebangsaan Taman Keramat
- Sekolah Menengah Kebangsaan Taman Kosas
- Sekolah Menengah Kebangsaan Taman Seraya
- Sekolah Menengah Kebangsaan Tasek Permai

=== List of Higher Learning Institutions in Ampang Jaya ===
==== Public Higher Learning Institutions ====
- Universiti Sains Islam Malaysia Ampang Campus (Pandan Indah)
- Kolej Komuniti Ampang (Taman Bukit Indah)

The nearest private higher learning institution to Ampang Jaya, Poly-Tech Mara University (UPTM) in Cheras is located adjacent to the boundary between Pandan Indah, Ampang and Shamelin, Cheras, Kuala Lumpur.

== Politics ==
Ampang is represented in the Dewan Rakyat of the Malaysian Parliament by Rodziah Ismail of PKR. She has held the seat since 2022.

On the state level, Ampang contributes two seats to the Selangor State Legislative Assembly, namely:

- Lembah Jaya, represented by Syed Ahmad Syed Abdul Rahman Alhadad @ Altimet of PKR; and
- Bukit Antarabangsa, represented by Mohd Kamri Kamaruddin of PKR.

The Ampang Jaya municipality however also covers the Pandan parliamentary constituency and the Hulu Klang state constituency within the Gombak parliamentary constituency.

== Transportation ==
=== Car ===
Effectively a suburb of Kuala Lumpur, Ampang is well connected to other places by a series of federal highways, tolled highways and state routes. Jalan Ampang is the main thoroughfare from downtown Kuala Lumpur until Taman Rimba Ampang. The AKLEH diverted some of the traffic from Jalan Ampang. The MRR2 Federal Route 28 runs through Ampang in a north–south orientation - this road is now the main route taken by Ampang motorists to get to either Pahang due north or Negeri Sembilan due south. The Besraya Expressway extension begins in Kampung Ampang Campuran, goes through Pandan Indah and all the way to Seri Kembangan.

Besides that, there is a state-level hill road to Hulu Langat which serves as a shortcut to Kajang.

=== Public transportation ===
Ampang is the namesake and terminus of the Ampang Line, which is Malaysia's first LRT/metro system. The station, renovated in 2012, is located along Jalan Ampang. The stretch between Ampang and Plaza Rakyat used to be part of KTM Intercity until the 1990s. KTM presently does not serve Ampang or its surroundings.

Other than the aforementioned Ampang station, the Ampang Jaya municipal district is also served by the Cahaya, Cempaka, Pandan Indah and Pandan Jaya stations, all on the Ampang Line.

The Cempaka-Pandan Jaya stretch is however not in Ampang proper, but located in the adjacent constituency of Pandan instead.

According to unofficial proposals, a MRT Circle Line, surrounding downtown Kuala Lumpur would be built. Ampang station was reportedly one of the possible stops, along Abdullah Hukum, Bandar Malaysia, Segambut, Sentul Timur, Jelatek and Taman Midah.

Besides the LRT, bus and taxi options are available. For example, rapidKL bus route 300 leads from the Ampang LRT station to KLCC.

=== Demand Responsive Transit (DRT) ===
Officially launched on 1 December 2023, Trek Rides is an on-demand van-hailing service that provides affordable and convenient transportation for residents of Pandan Indah, Pandan Jaya, Taman Muda, Bandar Baru Ampang, Taman Dagang, Kampung Baru Ampang and KL side Taman Maluri, currently every way fare is RM2. The service operates from 7 am to 9 pm and can be booked through the Trek Rides mobile application via the multiple payment option.

== See also ==
- Ampang, Kuala Lumpur, Kuala Lumpur's portion of greater Ampang
