= Pandan Jaya =

Human settlement in Malaysia

Pandan Jaya is a township in Hulu Langat District, Selangor, Malaysia. There is a Light Rail Transit station with the same name that serves the people in the town.
