= Ampang LRT station =

Railway station in Selangor, Malaysia

AG18 Ampang
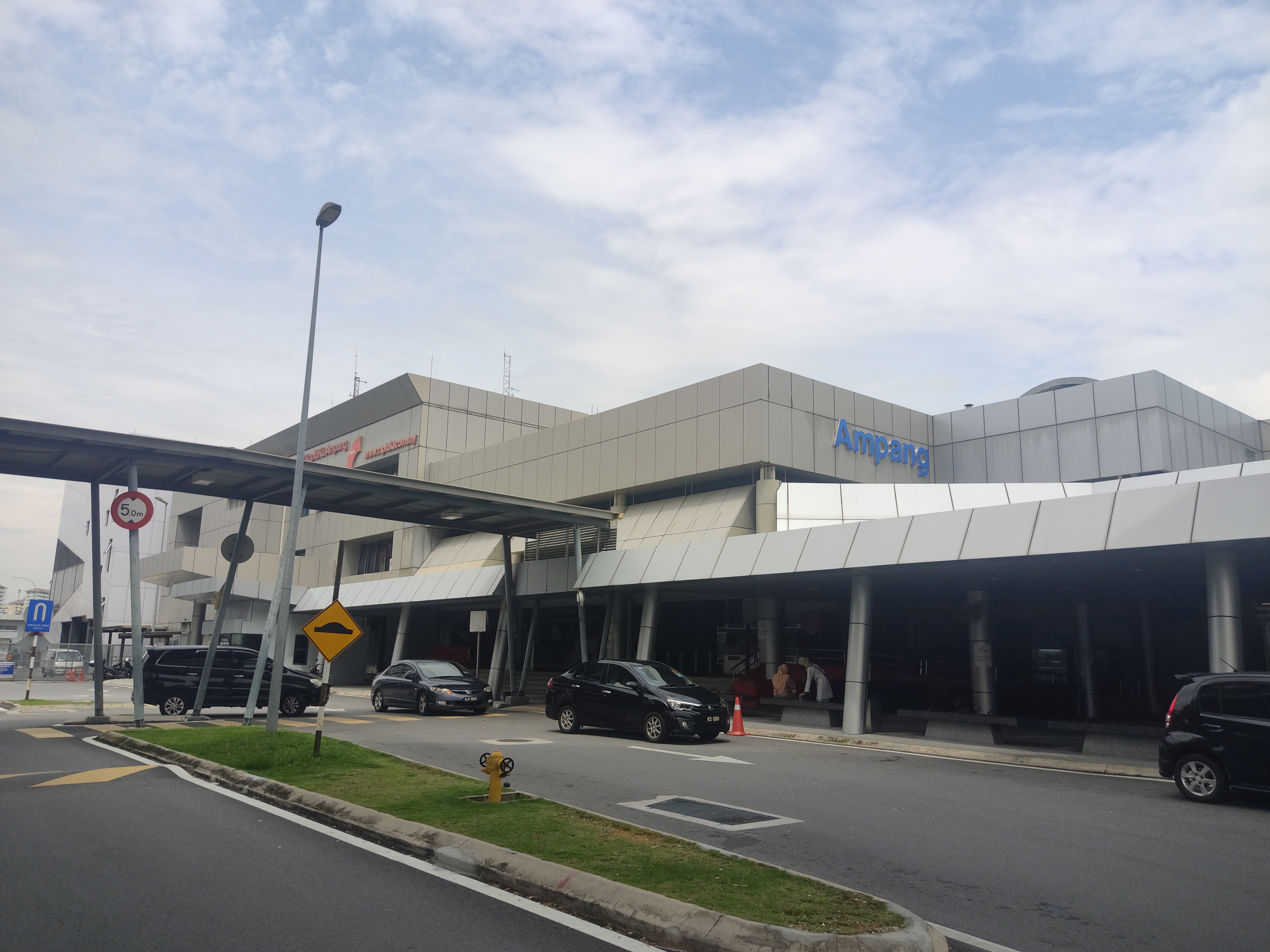
- Front facade of the station.

General information
- Other names: Malay: امڤڠ (Jawi); Chinese: 安邦; Tamil: அம்பாங்
- Location: Off Jalan Ampang, Pekan Ampang, 68000 Ampang; Selangor; Malaysia
- Coordinates: 3°9′1″N 101°45′36″E
- System: Rapid KL
- Owner: Prasarana Malaysia
- Operator: Rapid Rail
- Line: 3 Ampang Line
- Platforms: 1 island platform
- Tracks: 2

Construction
- Structure type: Surface
- Parking: Available with payment. 1360 total parking bays.

Other information
- Station code: AG18

History
- Opened: 16 December 1996; 29 years ago

Services
Preceding station		Following station
Cahaya towards Sentul Timur	Ampang Line	Terminus
Location

The Ampang LRT station is a light rapid transit (LRT) station operated by Rapid KL and served by the LRT Ampang Line in Ampang, Selangor, Malaysia, just outside the eastern boundary of Kuala Lumpur. It is the eastern terminus for passenger services on the line. This station was opened in 1996, along with 17 other LRT stations.

== Features ==
Ticketing machines and a CIMB Bank ATM were installed at the station concourse, as well as a convenience store. Ramps linking the Jalan Ampang bus station, the taxi stand, the car park area and the station concourse were added in 2012.

A multi-storey car park, similar to the one at Gombak, was added in 2014. Only Touch 'n Go cards are accepted for payment at the carpark, which charges a flat rate of MYR 4 per day.

== History ==
The station was opened on 16 December 1996, as part of the first phase of the former STAR LRT system's opening, alongside 13 adjoining stations along the Sultan Ismail-Ampang route. This station also houses a depot for the LRT train services and maintenance. This depot was the only depot that served both the LRT Ampang Line and LRT Sri Petaling Line before the opening of the Kuala Sungai Baru depot located near Putra Heights station.

== Ampang-Chan Sow Lin shuttle service ==
Between July and December 2016, upon the opening of the Puchong Perdana-Putra Heights stretch and the full deployment of the new CSR Zhuzhou trains on the Sentul Timur-Putra Heights stretch (the entire route of the LRT Sri Petaling Line), the old Adtranz trains in use since 1996 were reduced to serve only the Ampang-Chan Sow Lin stretch pending the completion of the signalling system on the whole line. Commuters going from Ampang to the Kuala Lumpur city centre (i.e. Masjid Jamek) or vice versa were required to alight at Chan Sow Lin and switch from the Adtranz trains to the new CSR Zhuzhou trains.

Direct travel between Ampang and Sentul Timur, as it was before July 2016, was restored on 1 December 2016, following the completion of the upgrading of the signalling system on the Ampang-Chan Sow Lin stretch, which also saw the wholesale replacement of the old Adtranz trains with the new CSR Zhuzhou trains.

== Yard ==
Depoh Ampang
- Interactive map of Depoh Ampang

Location
- Location: Jalan Ampang, Ampang, Selangor

Characteristics
- Owner: Prasarana Malaysia
- Operator: Rapid Rail ( Rapid KL)
- Roads: B31 Jalan Ampang; Sungai Besi–Ulu Klang Elevated Expressway (SUKE)
- Rolling stock: CRRC LRV "Amy"
- Routes served: 3 Ampang Line

History
- Opened: 1996

The station is also co-located with the Ampang Depot, one of two yards serving the Ampang and Sri Petaling lines.

== See also ==
- List of rail transit stations in Klang Valley
