= List of diplomatic missions in Kuala Lumpur =

This is a list of foreign missions and other diplomatic missions in Kuala Lumpur, Malaysia.

== Foreign missions ==
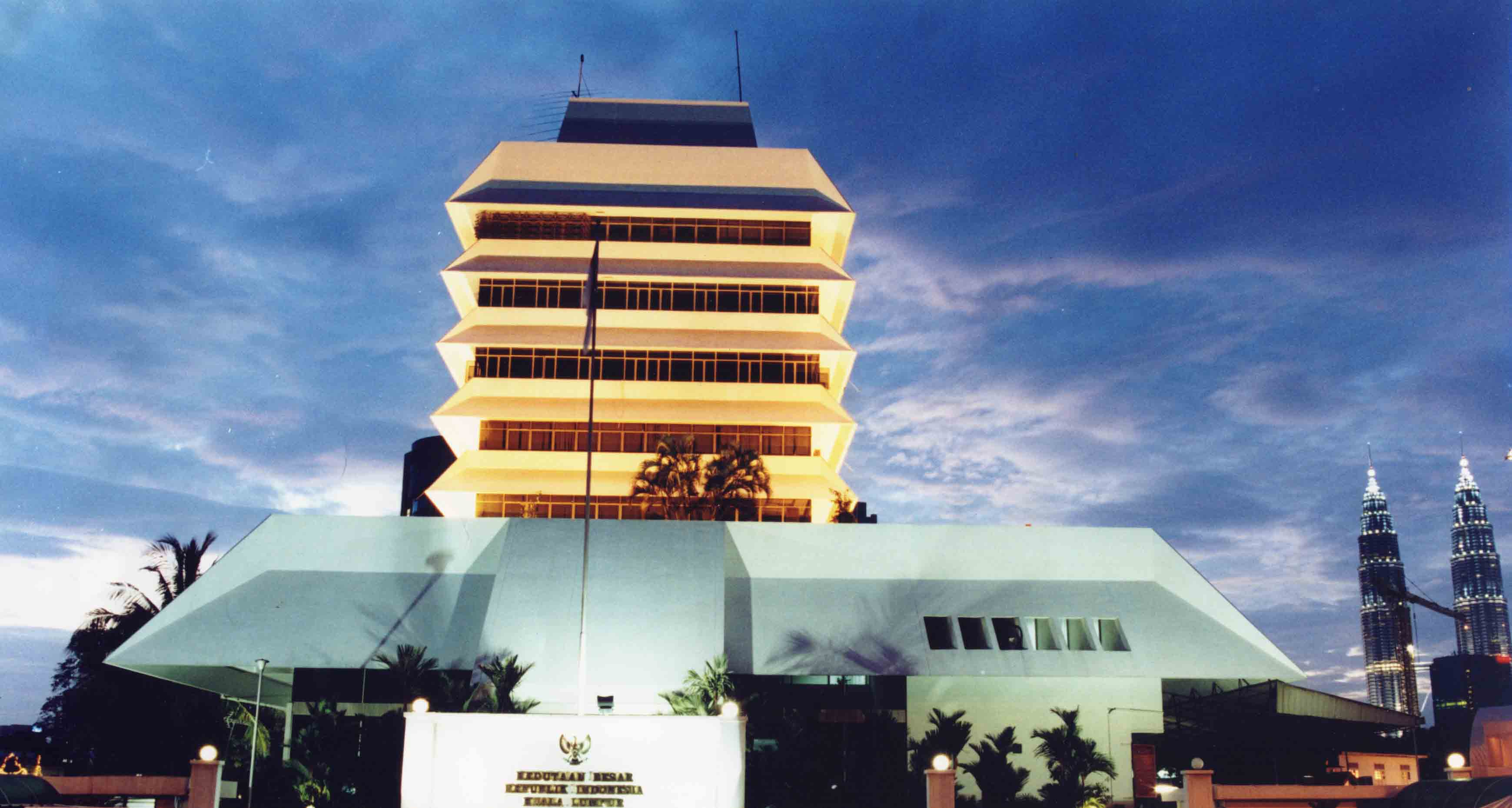
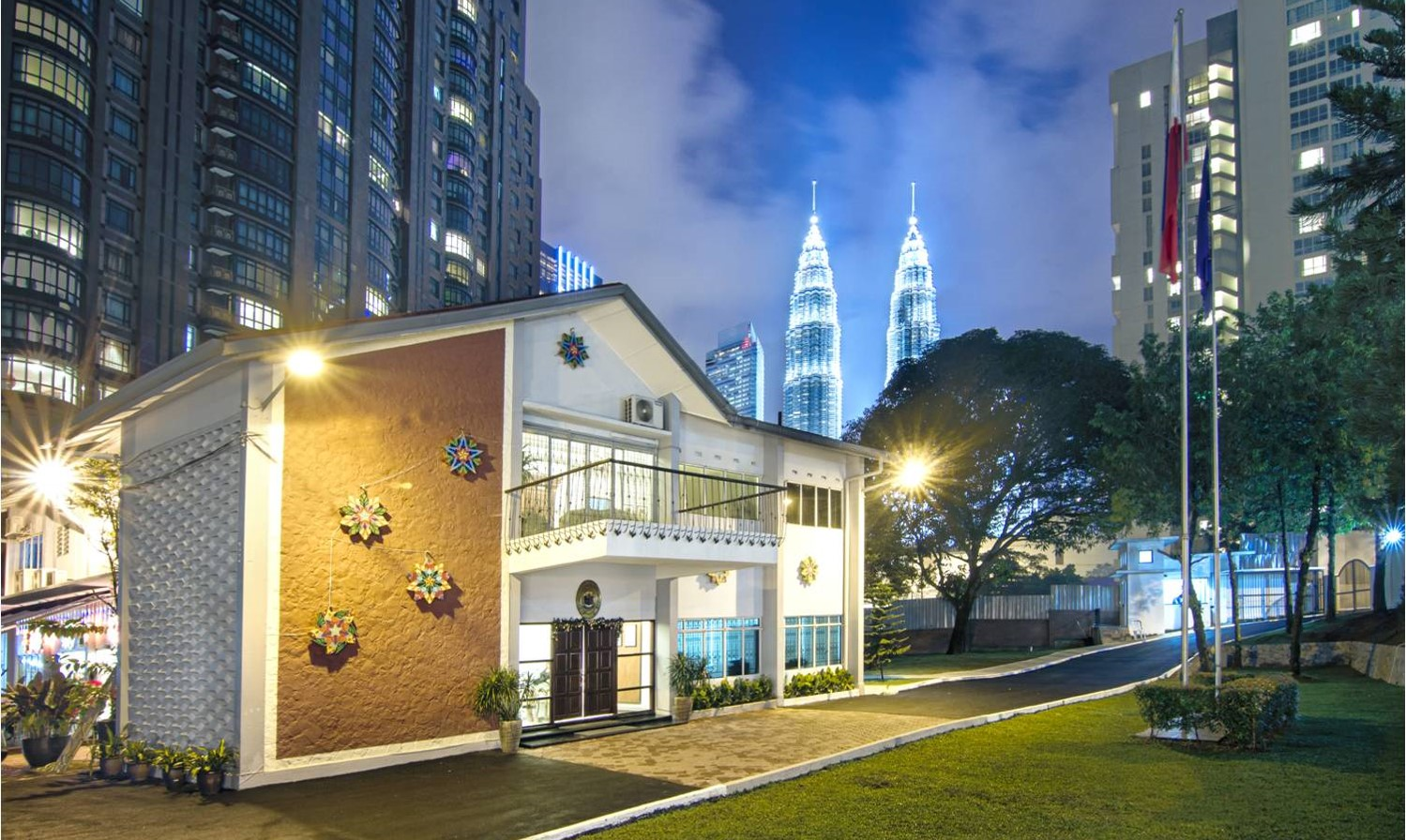
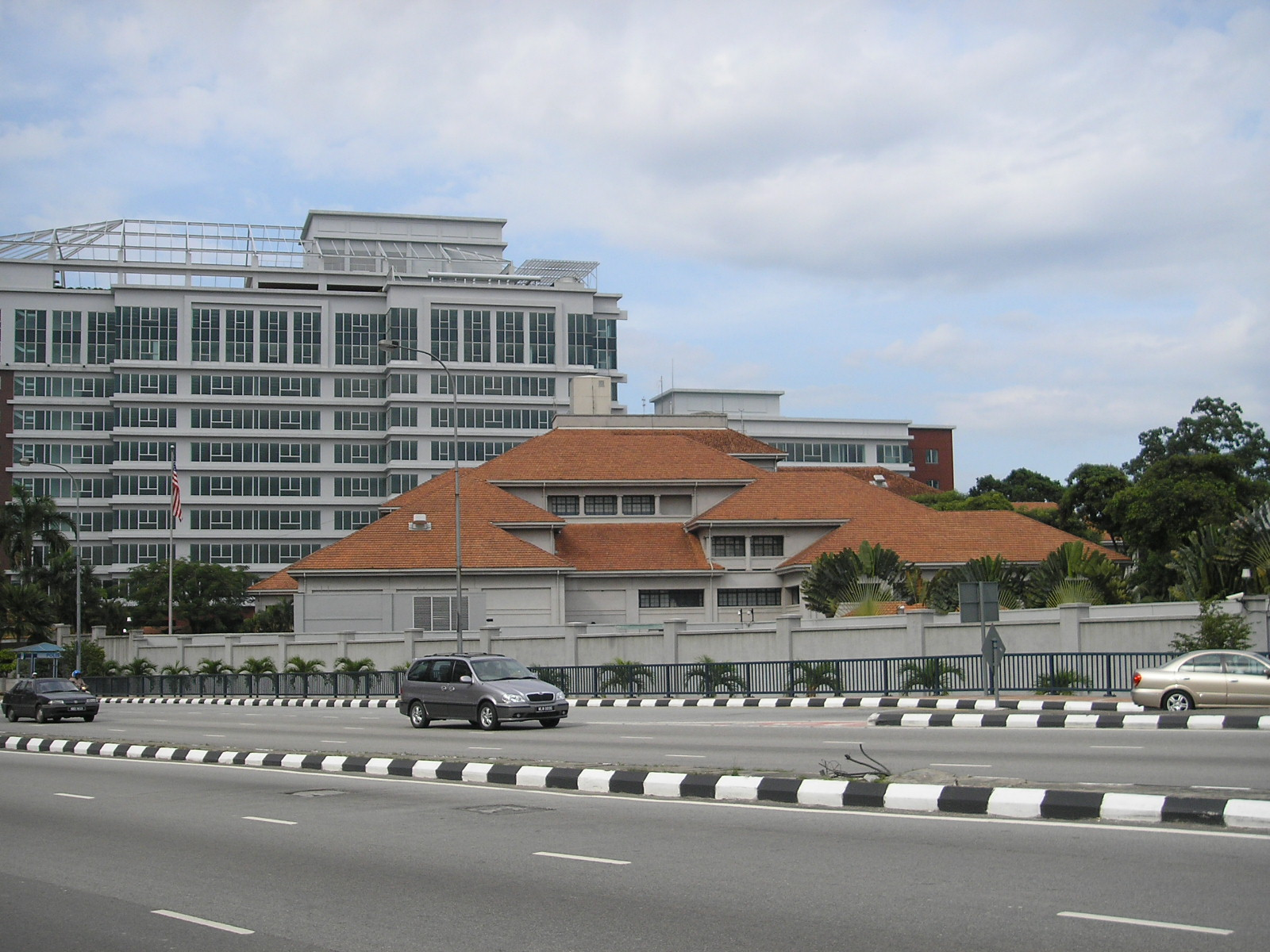
Country	Foreign Mission	Head Of Mission	Vehicle Code	Area	Image
Afghanistan	EMBASSY OF THE ISLAMIC REPUBLIC OF AFGHANISTAN	H.E. Dr. Mohib Rahman Spingar Ambassador Extraordinary and Plenipotentiary	87-00-DC	Wisma Sin Heap Lee, Jalan Tun Razak
Algeria	EMBASSY OF THE PEOPLE’S DEMOCRATIC REPUBLIC OF ALGERIA	H.E. Nasreddine Rimouche Ambassador Extraordinary and Plenipotentiary	77-00-DC	Jalan Damai, Ampang
Argentina	EMBASSY OF THE ARGENTINE REPUBLIC	H.E. Marta Laura Gabrieloni Ambassador Extraordinary and Plenipotentiary	62-00-DC	Jalan Bukit Bintang
Australia	HIGH COMMISSION OF AUSTRALIA	H.E. Danielle Heinecke High Commissioner	15-00-DC	Jalan Yap Kwan Seng
Austria	EMBASSY OF THE REPUBLIC OF AUSTRIA	H.E. Dr Michael Postl Ambassador Extraordinary and Plenipotentiary	37-00-DC	Jalan Raja Chulan
Azerbaijan	EMBASSY OF THE REPUBLIC OF AZERBAIJAN	H.E. Qaley Allahverdiyev Ambassador Extraordinary and Plenipotentiary	00-00-DC	Ampang
Bahrain	EMBASSY OF THE KINGDOM OF BAHRAIN	Ms. Maram Anwar Jaafar Alsaleh Chargé d'affaires		Wisma Goodhill, Jalan Raja Chulan
Bangladesh	HIGH COMMISSION FOR THE PEOPLE'S REPUBLIC OF BANGLADESH	H.E. Md. Golam Sarwar High Commissioner	19-00-DC	Taman U-Thant
Belgium	EMBASSY OF BELGIUM	H.E. Pascal Gregoire Ambassador Extraordinary and Plenipotentiary	25-00-DC	Menara Tan & Tan, Jalan Tun Razak
Bosnia and Herzegovina	EMBASSY OF BOSNIA AND HERZEGOVINA	H.E. Edin Jahić Ambassador Extraordinary and Plenipotentiary	80-00-DC	Jalan Bellamy
Brazil	EMBASSY OF FEDERATIVE REPUBLIC OF BRAZIL	H.E. Daniella Ortega de Paiva Menezes Ambassador Extraordinary and Plenipotentiary	55-00-DC	Menara Tan & Tan, Jalan Tun Razak
Brunei	HIGH COMMISSION OF BRUNEI DARUSSALAM	Pingiran Asnawi Arbi Pengiran Datuk Paduka Hj. Sharifuddin Chargé d'affaires	54-00-DC	Putrajaya
Cambodia	ROYAL EMBASSY OF CAMBODIA	H.E. Cheuy Vichet Ambassador Extraordinary and Plenipotentiary	34-00-DC	Taman U-Thant
Canada	HIGH COMMISSION OF CANADA	Ms. Esther Van Nes Chargé d'affaires	22-00-DC	Menara Tan & Tan, Jalan Tun Razak
Chile	EMBASSY OF THE REPUBLIC OF CHILE	H.E. Diego Velasco von Pilgrimm Ambassador Extraordinary and Plenipotentiary	68-00-DC	Jalan Ampang
China	EMBASSY OF THE PEOPLE’S REPUBLIC OF CHINA	H.E. Ouyang Yujing Ambassador Extraordinary and Plenipotentiary	49-00-DC	Taman U-Thant
Colombia	EMBASSY OF THE REPUBLIC OF COLOMBIA	H.E. Mauricio González López Ambassador Extraordinary and Plenipotentiary	84-00-DC	UOA Centre, Jalan Pinang
Croatia	EMBASSY OF THE REPUBLIC OF CROATIA	H.E. Ivan Velimir Starčević Ambassador Extraordinary and Plenipotentiary	86-00-DC	The Intermark Vista Tower, Jalan Tun Razak
Cuba	EMBASSY OF THE REPUBLIC OF CUBA	H.E. Florentino Batista Gonzalez Ambassador Extraordinary and Plenipotentiary	97-00-DC	Jalan Damai, Ampang
Czech Republic	EMBASSY OF THE CZECH REPUBLIC	H.E. Milan Hupcej Ambassador Extraordinary and Plenipotentiary	50-00-DC	The Intermark Vista Tower, Jalan Tun Razak
Denmark	ROYAL DANISH EMBASSY	H.E. Kirstine Vangkilde Berner Ambassador Extraordinary and Plenipotentiary	43-00-DC	Ilham Tower, Jalan Binjai, Kuala Lumpur
Egypt	EMBASSY OF THE ARAB REPUBLIC OF EGYPT	H.E. Gamal Abdelrehim Mohamed Metwally Ambassador Extraordinary and Plenipotentiary	32-00-DC	Ampang
Eswatini	HIGH COMMISSION OF THE KINGDOM OF ESWATINI	H.E. Mlondi Solomon Dlamini High Commissioner	31-00-DC	Jalan Ampang
European Union	DELEGATION OF THE EUROPEAN UNION	H.E. Michail Rokas Head of the Delegation	100-00-DC	Menara Tan & Tan, Jalan Tun Razak
Finland	EMBASSY OF FINLAND	H.E. Sami Rafael Leino Ambassador Extraordinary and Plenipotentiary	53-00-DC	Wisma Chinese Chamber, Jalan Ampang
France	EMBASSY OF THE REPUBLIC OF FRANCE	H.E. Roland Galharague Ambassador Extraordinary and Plenipotentiary	47-00-DC	The Intermark Vista Tower, Jalan Tun Razak
Gambia	HIGH COMMISSION OF THE GAMBIA	Mdm Binta Singhateh Chargé d'affaires	115-00-DC	UOA Centre, Jalan Pinang
Georgia	EMBASSY OF THE REPUBLIC OF GEORGIA	H.E. Nikoloz Abkhazava Ambassador Extraordinary and Plenipotentiary	114-00-DC	Wisma Sin Heap Lee, Jalan Tun Razak
Germany	EMBASSY OF THE FEDERAL REPUBLIC OF GERMANY	H.E. Peter-Christof Otto Blomeyer Ambassador Extraordinary and Plenipotentiary	18-00-DC	Menara Tan & Tan, Jalan Tun Razak
Ghana	HIGH COMMISSION FOR THE REPUBLIC OF GHANA	Her Excellency Akua Sekyiwa Ahenkora High Commissioner	94-00-DC	Ampang
Guinea	EMBASSY OF THE REPUBLIC OF GUINEA	H.E. Mohamed Lamine Conde Ambassador Extraordinary and Plenipotentiary	92-00-DC	Jalan Kedondong, Ampang
Holy See	THE APOSTOLIC NUNCIATURE (EMBASSY OF THE HOLY SEE)	H.E. Archbishop Wojciech Zaluski Ambassador Extraordinary and Plenipotentiary	110-00-DC	Ampang
Hungary	EMBASSY OF HUNGARY	H.E. Dr. Ponevacs-Pana Petra Ambassador Extraordinary and Plenipotentiary	75-00-DC	Wisma Goodhill, Jalan Raja Chulan
India	HIGH COMMISSION OF INDIA	H.E. Maridul Kumar High Commissioner	40-00-DC	Jalan Pahang
Indonesia	EMBASSY OF THE REPUBLIC OF INDONESIA	H.E. Hermono Ambassador Extraordinary and Plenipotentiary	29-00-DC	Jalan Tun Razak
Iran	EMBASSY OF THE ISLAMIC REPUBLIC OF IRAN	H.E. Ali Asghar Mohammadi Ambassador Extraordinary and Plenipotentiary	57-00-DC	Taman U-Thant
Iraq	EMBASSY OF THE REPUBLIC OF IRAQ	Dr. Hamed Ibraheem Abd-Alkareem Al-Jeboori Chargé d'affaires	44-00-DC	Jalan Tun Razak
Ireland	EMBASSY OF IRELAND	Her Excellency Hilary Reilly Ambassador Extraordinary and Plenipotentiary	83-00-DC	The AmpWalk, Jalan Ampang
Italy	EMBASSY OF ITALY	H.E. Massimo Rustico Ambassador Extraordinary and Plenipotentiary	20-00-DC	Taman U-Thant
Japan	EMBASSY OF JAPAN	H.E. Hiroshi Oka Ambassador Extraordinary and Plenipotentiary	46-00-DC	Jalan Tun Razak
Jordan	EMBASSY OF THE HASHEMITE KINGDOM OF JORDAN	H.E. Thamer Abdalla Mohammad Adwan Ambassador Extraordinary and Plenipotentiary	96-00-DC	Jalan Kedondong, Ampang
Kazakhstan	EMBASSY OF THE REPUBLIC OF KAZAKHSTAN	H.E. Bolat Barievich Imanbayev Ambassador Extraordinary and Plenipotentiary	93-00-DC	Ampang
Kenya	HIGH COMMISSION OF THE REPUBLIC OF KENYA	H.E. Francis Ndegwa Muhoro High Commissioner	91-00-DC	Taman U-Thant
Kuwait	EMBASSY OF THE STATE OF KUWAIT	H.E. Dr. Hamad Mohammad Hassan Burhamah Ambassador Extraordinary and Plenipotentiary	54-00-DC	Jalan Tun Razak
Kyrgyzstan	EMBASSY OF THE KYRGYZ REPUBLIC	Mr. Samat Zhanabay' Chargé d'affaires	95-00-DC	Wisma Sin Heap Lee, Jalan Tun Razak
Laos	EMBASSY OF THE LAO PEOPLE'S DEMOCRATIC REPUBLIC	Her Excellency Viengsavanh Sipraseuth Ambassador Extraordinary and Plenipotentiary	72-00-DC	Jalan Damai, Ampang
Lebanon	EMBASSY OF LEBANON	H.E. George Bitar Ghanem Ambassador Extraordinary and Plenipotentiary	103-00-DC	Ampang
Lesotho	HIGH COMMISSION OF THE KINGDOM OF LESOTHO	H.E. Maj. General (Rtd) Lineo Bernard Poopa High Commissioner		Jalan Ampang
Libya	EMBASSY OF THE STATE OF LIBYA	Dr. Nagat M.S. Elforgani Chargé d'affaires	14-00-DC	Taman U-Thant
Maldives	EMBASSY OF THE REPUBLIC OF MALDIVES	Her Excellency Visam Ali Ambassador Extraordinary and Plenipotentiary	105-00-DC	Menara See Hoy Chan, Jalan Tun Razak
Mauritius	HIGH COMMISSION OF THE REPUBLIC OF MAURITIUS	H.E. Jagdiswar Goburdhun High Commissioner	67-00-DC	Jalan Ampang
Mexico	EMBASSY OF MEXICO	Mr. Adolfo Garcia Estrada Chargé d'affaires	71-00-DC	Menara Tan & Tan, Jalan Tun Razak
Morocco	EMBASSY OF THE KINGDOM OF MOROCCO	Mr. Omar Bouchiar Chargé d'affaires	66-00-DC	Jalan Ampang
Myanmar	EMBASSY OF THE REPUBLIC OF THE UNION OF MYANMAR	Mr. Than Htwe Chargé d'affaires	41-00-DC	Ampang
Namibia	HIGH COMMISSION OF THE REPUBLIC OF NAMIBIA	H.E. Herman Pule Diamonds High Commissioner	88-00-DC	Jalan Kia Peng
Nepal	EMBASSY OF NEPAL	H.E. Udaya Raj Pandey Ambassador Extraordinary and Plenipotentiary	101-00-DC	Jalan Ampang
Netherlands	EMBASSY OF THE KINGDOM OF THE NETHERLANDS	H.E. Aart Jacobi Ambassador Extraordinary and Plenipotentiary	23-00-DC	The AmpWalk, Jalan Ampang
New Zealand	HIGH COMMISSION OF NEW ZEALAND	H.E. Pam Chong Dunn High Commissioner	35-00-DC	Jalan Sultan Ismail
Nigeria	HIGH COMMISSION OF THE FEDERAL REPUBLIC OF NIGERIA	Mrs. Rahmat O. Mohammed Chargé d'affaires	70-00-DC	Ampang
Norway	THE ROYAL NORWEGIAN EMBASSY	Her Excellency Gunn Jorid Roset Ambassador Extraordinary and Plenipotentiary	60-00-DC	The Intermark Vista Tower, Jalan Tun Razak
Oman	EMBASSY OF THE SULTANATE OF OMAN	H.E. Sheikh Al-Abbas Ibrahim Hamed Al Harthi Ambassador Extraordinary and Plenipotentiary	59-00-DC	Jalan Kedondong, Ampang
Pakistan	HIGH COMMISSION FOR THE ISLAMIC REPUBLIC OF PAKISTAN	Her Excellency Amna Baloch High Commissioner	17-00-DC	Jalan Ampang
Palestine	EMBASSY OF THE STATE OF PALESTINE	H.E. Walid A. M. Abuali Ambassador Extraordinary and Plenipotentiary	61-00-DC	Taman U-Thant
Papua New Guinea	HIGH COMMISSION OF PAPUA NEW GUINEA	H.E. Peter Vincent High Commissioner	102-00-DC	Taman U-Thant
Peru	EMBASSY OF THE REPUBLIC OF PERU	Mr. Agustin Palacios Morales-Bemúdez Chargé d'affaires	76-00-DC	Jalan Ampang
Philippines	EMBASSY OF THE PHILIPPINES	H.E. Charles C. Jose Ambassador Extraordinary and Plenipotentiary	26-00-DC	Changkat Kia Peng
Poland	EMBASSY OF THE REPUBLIC OF POLAND	H.E. Krzysztof Debnicki Ambassador Extraordinary and Plenipotentiary	30-00-DC	Jalan Damai, Ampang
Qatar	EMBASSY OF THE STATE OF QATAR	H.E. Fahad Mohammed Yousef Kafoud Ambassador Extraordinary and Plenipotentiary	104-00-DC	Ampang
Romania	EMBASSY OF ROMANIA	H.E. Nineta Bărbulescu Ambassador Extraordinary and Plenipotentiary	27-00-DC	Jalan Damai, Ampang
Russia	EMBASSY OF THE RUSSIAN FEDERATION	H.E. Nail Latypov Ambassador Extraordinary and Plenipotentiary	24-00-DC	Jalan Ampang
Saudi Arabia	ROYAL EMBASSY OF SAUDI ARABIA	H.E. Mahmud H.S Qattan Ambassador Extraordinary and Plenipotentiary	48-00-DC	Wisma Chinese Chamber, Jalan Ampang
Senegal	EMBASSY OF THE REPUBLIC OF SENEGAL	H.E. Abdoulaye Barro Ambassador Extraordinary and Plenipotentiary	98-00-DC	Jalan Kedondong, Ampang
Singapore	HIGH COMMISSION OF THE REPUBLIC OF SINGAPORE	H.E. Vanu Gopala Menon High Commissioner	39-00-DC	Jalan Tun Razak
Somalia	EMBASSY OF THE FEDERAL REPUBLIC OF SOMALIA	H.E. Abukar Abdi Osman Ambassador Extraordinary and Plenipotentiary	111-00-DC	Jalan Damai, Ampang
Sri Lanka	HIGH COMMISSION OF THE DEMOCRATIC SOCIALIST REPUBLIC OF SRI LANKA	H.E. Air Chief Marshal Kapila Veedhiya Bandara Jayampathy High Commissioner	10-00-DC	Jalan Sultan Ismail
South Africa	HIGH COMMISSION OF THE REPUBLIC OF SOUTH AFRICA	H.E. David Evan Malcomson High Commissioner	79-00-DC	Jalan Kia Peng
South Korea	EMBASSY OF THE REPUBLIC OF KOREA	H.E. Lee Chi Beom Ambassador Extraordinary and Plenipotentiary	36-00-DC	Jalan Ampang
Spain	EMBASSY OF SPAIN	H.E. Jose Miguel Corvinos Lafuente Ambassador Extraordinary and Plenipotentiary	64-00-DC	The Icon, Jalan Tun Razak
Sudan	EMBASSY OF THE REPUBLIC OF SUDAN	Mr. Bakhit Ismail Dahya Ali Chargé d'affaires	69-00-DC	Ampang
Switzerland	EMBASSY OF SWITZERLAND	Her Excellency Andrea Reichlin Ambassador Extraordinary and Plenipotentiary	12-00-DC	Persiaran Madge, Taman U-Thant
Sweden	EMBASSY OF SWEDEN	H.E. Dag Anders Matts Juhlin-Dannfelt Ambassador Extraordinary and Plenipotentiary	33-00-DC	Jalan Mayang Sari
Syria	EMBASSY OF THE SYRIAN ARAB REPUBLIC	Mr. Tamim Madani Chargé d'affaires	21-00-DC	Taman U-Thant
Tajikistan	EMBASSY OF THE REPUBLIC OF TAJIKISTAN	H.E. Ardasher S. Qodiri Ambassador Extraordinary and Plenipotentiary	117-00-DC	Ampang
Tanzania	HIGH COMMISSION OF THE UNITED REPUBLIC OF TANZANIA	H.E. Dr. Ramadhani Kitwana Dau High Commissioner		Taman U-Thant
Thailand	ROYAL THAI EMBASSY	H.E. Chainarong Keratiyutwong Ambassador Extraordinary and Plenipotentiary	11-00-DC	Jalan Ampang
Timor Leste	EMBASSY OF THE DEMOCRATIC REPUBLIC OF TIMOR-LESTE	Her Excellency Maria Olandina Isabel Caeiro Alves Ambassador Extraordinary and Plenipotentiary	56-00-DC	Ampang
Turkey	EMBASSY OF THE REPUBLIC OF TURKEY	H.E. Dr. Merve Kavakci Ambassador Extraordinary and Plenipotentiary	51-00-DC	Menara Tan & Tan, Jalan Tun Razak
Turkmenistan	EMBASSY OF TURKMENISTAN	H.E. Muhammetnyyaz Mashalov Ambassador Extraordinary and Plenipotentiary		Wisma Sin Heap Lee, Jalan Tun Razak
Uganda	HIGH COMMISSION OF THE REPUBLIC OF UGANDA	H.E. Samali Dorothy Hyuha High Commissioner		Plazza OSK, Jalan Ampang
Ukraine	EMBASSY OF UKRAINE	H.E. Denys Mykalihuk (acting) Ambassador Extraordinary and Plenipotentiary	63-00-DC	Menara Tan & Tan, Jalan Tun Razak
United Arab Emirates	EMBASSY OF THE UNITED ARAB EMIRATES	H.E. Khalid Ghanim AlGhaith Ambassador Extraordinary and Plenipotentiary	85-00-DC	Ampang
United Kingdom	BRITISH HIGH COMMISSION	H.E. Charles Hay High Commissioner	38-00-DC	Menara Binjai, Jalan Ampang
United States of America	EMBASSY OF THE UNITED STATES OF AMERICA	H.E. Brian D. McFeeters Ambassador Extraordinary and Plenipotentiary	16-00-DC	Jalan Tun Razak
Uruguay	EMBASSY OF THE ORIENTAL REPUBLIC OF URUGUAY	Mr. Juan Andres Gervaso Ortiz Chargé d'affaires	82-00-DC	UBN Tower, Jalan P. Ramlee
Uzbekistan	EMBASSY OF THE REPUBLIC OF UZBEKISTAN	H.E. Ravshan Usmanov Ambassador Extraordinary and Plenipotentiary	89-00-DC	Ampang
Venezuela	EMBASSY OF THE BOLIVARIAN REPUBLIC OF VENEZUELA	Mr. Morellah Antoni Barreto López Chargé d'affaires	73-00-DC	Menara Tan & Tan, Jalan Tun Razak
Vietnam	EMBASSY OF THE SOCIALIST REPUBLIC OF VIET NAM	H.E. Dinh Ngoc Linh Ambassador Extraordinary and Plenipotentiary	42-00-DC	Persiaran Stonor
Yemen	EMBASSY OF THE REPUBLIC OF YEMEN	H.E. Dr. Adel Mohamed Ali BA Hamid Ambassador Extraordinary and Plenipotentiary	99-00-DC	Jalan Kedondong, Ampang
Zambia	HIGH COMMISSION OF THE REPUBLIC OF ZAMBIA	H.E. Walubita Imakando High Commissioner	109-00-DC	Menara MBF, Jalan Sultan Ismail
Zimbabwe	EMBASSY OF THE REPUBLIC OF ZIMBABWE	Mr. Isheanopa Fanuel Rufu Chargé d'affaires	74-00-DC	Ampang
