= Raja Uda MRT station =

Metro station in Kuala Lumpur, Malaysia

PY19 Raja Uda – Institut Jantung Negara
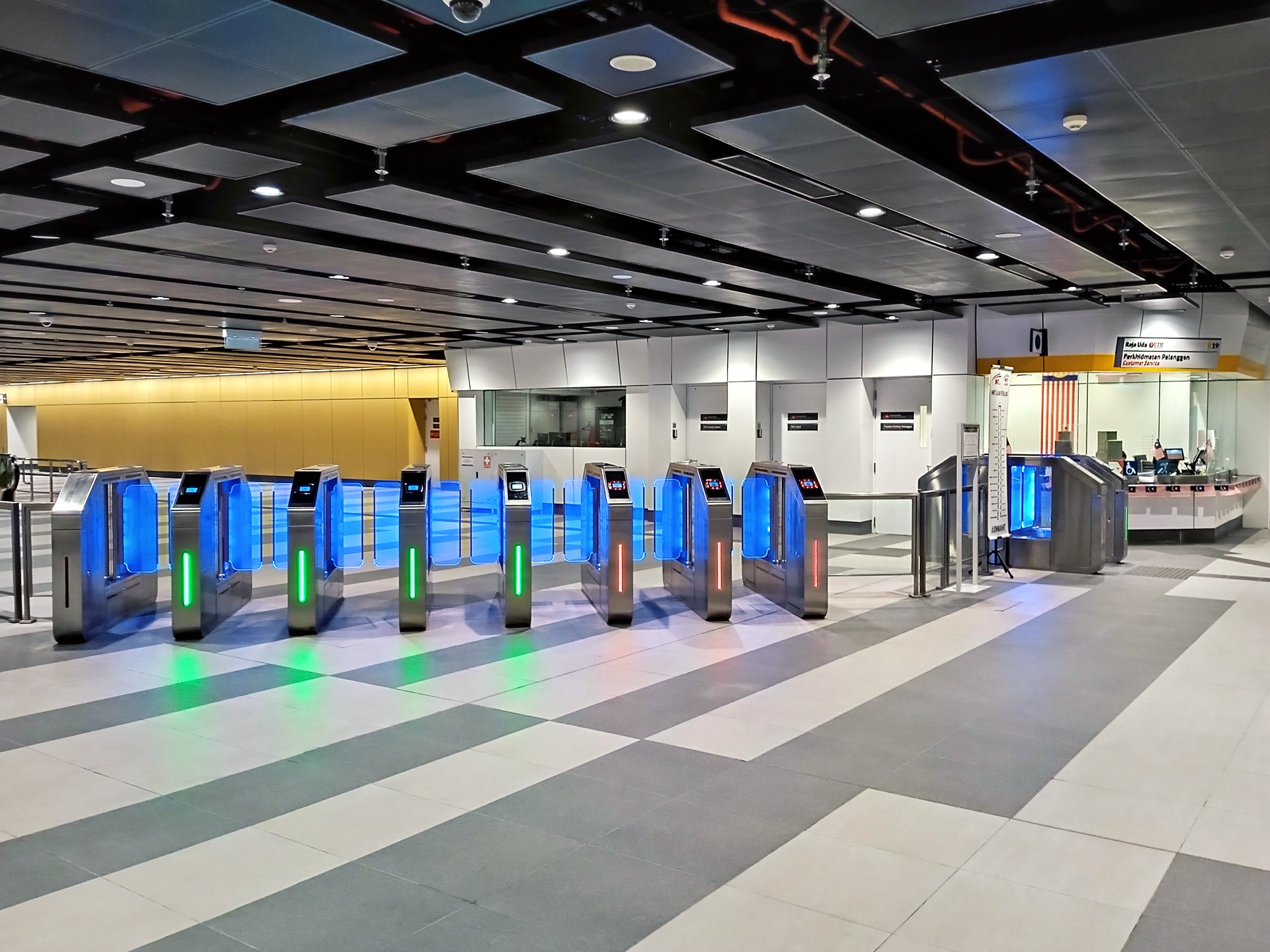
- Raja Uda MRT station

General information
- Other names: Malay: راج اودا (Jawi); Chinese: 拉惹乌达; Tamil: ராஜா ஊடா
- Location: Jalan Raja Muda Abdul Aziz, Kampung Baru; 50300 Kuala Lumpur; Malaysia
- Coordinates: 3.1678°N 101.7112°E
- System: Rapid KL
- Owner: MRT Corp
- Operator: Rapid Rail
- Line: 12 Putrajaya Line
- Platforms: 1 island platform
- Tracks: 2

Construction
- Structure type: Underground
- Depth: 21.3 metres (70 ft)
- Parking: Available
- Accessible: Yes

Other information
- Status: Operational
- Station code: PY19

History
- Opened: 16 March 2023; 3 years ago
- Former names: Raja Uda–UTM (2023-2026)

Services
Preceding station		Following station
Hospital Kuala Lumpur towards Kwasa Damansara	Putrajaya Line	Ampang Park towards Putrajaya Sentral
Location

The Raja Uda MRT station, also known as Raja Uda–Institut Jantung Negara MRT station under the station naming rights programme, is a mass rapid transit (MRT) station that serves the neighborhood of Kampung Baru in Kuala Lumpur, Malaysia. It is one of the stations on the MRT Putrajaya Line.

The station began operations on 16 March 2023. It was previously known as Raja Uda–UTM MRT station under the station naming rights programme from 2023 to 2026, with the naming rights given to the University of Technology Malaysia (UTM). Currently, it is named after the National Heart Institute (IJN).

== Station details ==
=== Location ===
The station is located on Jalan Raja Muda Abdul Aziz in the Kampung Baru subdistrict. It is one of two stations in the area, the other being the Kampung Baru LRT station on the LRT Kelana Jaya Line. It is also the nearest transit station to the National Cancer Society Malaysia (NCSM) headquarters located on Jalan Raja Muda Abdul Aziz.

=== Exits and entrances ===
Entrances A, B and D are currently open to the public. Entrance C has not been built yet.

Putrajaya Line station
Entrance	Location	Destination	Picture
A	South side of Jalan Raja Muda Abdul Aziz	Taxi and E-hailing layby, Jalan Haji Hashim, Jalan Abdul Manan Nordin, Kampung Baru neighborhood	
B	North side of Jalan Raja Muda Abdul Aziz	Bus stop, Setia Sky Residences, Bangunan Yayasan Selangor, Menara TH Selborn, The Orion Condo, SK Jalan Raja Muda, National Heart Institute (IJN)	
C postponed	Jalan Tun Razak	National Heart Institute, National Library of Malaysia, Hospital PUSRAWI	
D	Lorong Raja Uda 1	Jalan Raja Muda Abdul Aziz, Pertubuhan Keselamatan Sosial (PERKESO), Kampung Baru and PKNS Flats	

== Nearby ==
The station is behind Menara TH Selborn, currently housing the Federal Territory branch offices of the Election Commission of Malaysia. The station is also near the National Library of Malaysia and the National Heart Institute (IJN).

== Bus services ==
Located directly in the city centre, there are no MRT feeder buses available at this station. Several trunk buses are available via the nearby Setia Sky Residences bus stop.

Route No.	Operator	Origin	Desitination	Via	Connecting to
220	Rapid KL	Medan Pasar AG7 SP7 KJ13 Masjid Jamek	Taman Melawati, Ulu Klang	Jalan Munishi Abdullah; Jalan Raja Laut; MR10 Chow Kit; Jalan Raja Muda Abdul Aziz; PY19 Raja Uda (Entrance B for Taman Melawati-bound, Entrance A for Masjid Jamek-bound); Jalan Sultan Yahya Petra; Universiti Teknologi Malaysia Kuala Lumpur Campus; Jalan Padang Tembak; MINDEF; Jalan Keramat Dalam; KJ6 Jelatek; Jalan Enggang; Jalan AU3/1; FT 28 Kuala Lumpur Middle Ring Road 2 (MRR2); National Zoo of Malaysia; Jalan Taman Melawati	100, 103, 104, 107, 120, 150, 151, 152, 202, 222, 250, 253, 300, 303, GOKL-05-(ORANGE)
302	Rapid KL	Titiwangsa bus hub AG3 SP3 MR11 PY17 CC09 Titiwangsa	Kuala Lumpur City Centre KJ10 KLCC	Jalan Sultan Azlan Shah (Jalan Ipoh); MR10 Chow Kit; Jalan Raja Muda Abdul Aziz; PY19 Raja Uda (Entrance B for KLCC-bound, Entrance A for Titiwangsa-bound); Jalan Tun Razak; Jalan Ampang; KJ11 Ampang Park; PY20 Ampang Park; Jalan Yap Kwan Seng	300, 303, 402, GOKL-01-(GREEN), DS01
GOKL 05	Go KL City Bus	MINDEF	Titiwangsa bus hub AG3 SP3 MR11 PY17 CC09 Titiwangsa	Jalan Raja Muda Abdul Aziz; PY19 Raja Uda (only Entrance A for Titiwangsa-bound); MR10 Chow Kit; Kuala Lumpur Hospital	254, 220, 302, 402, GOKL-03-(RED), GOKL-04-(BLUE)
