= Tiang =

Tiang may refer to:

- Tiang language, Papua
- Tiang (antelope), an African species

People with the surname Tiang include:

- Jeremy Tiang (born 1977), Singaporean writer
- Thomas A. S. Tiang, Malaysian architect
