= Vista Tower =

Vista Tower may refer to:

- Vista Tower (Chicago), United States
- Vista Tower (Kuala Lumpur), Malaysia
