= Great Eastern Tower =

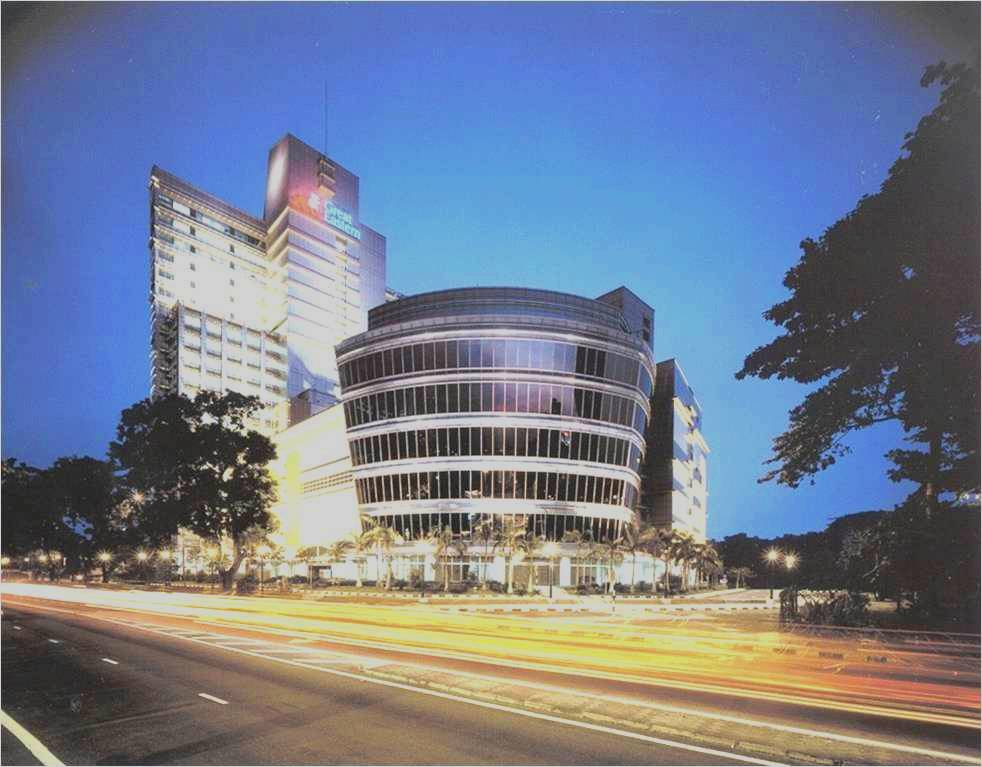
- Menara Great Eastern
- Interactive map of the Great Eastern Tower area

General information
- Location: Kuala Lumpur, Malaysia
- Coordinates: 3.160187°N 101.736727°E
- Construction started: 1998
- Completed: 2002

Technical details
- Floor count: 20 (5 basement floors)
- Floor area: 443,269 sq ft (41,181.0 m^{2})

Website
- https://greateasternmall.com.my/

Great Eastern Mall
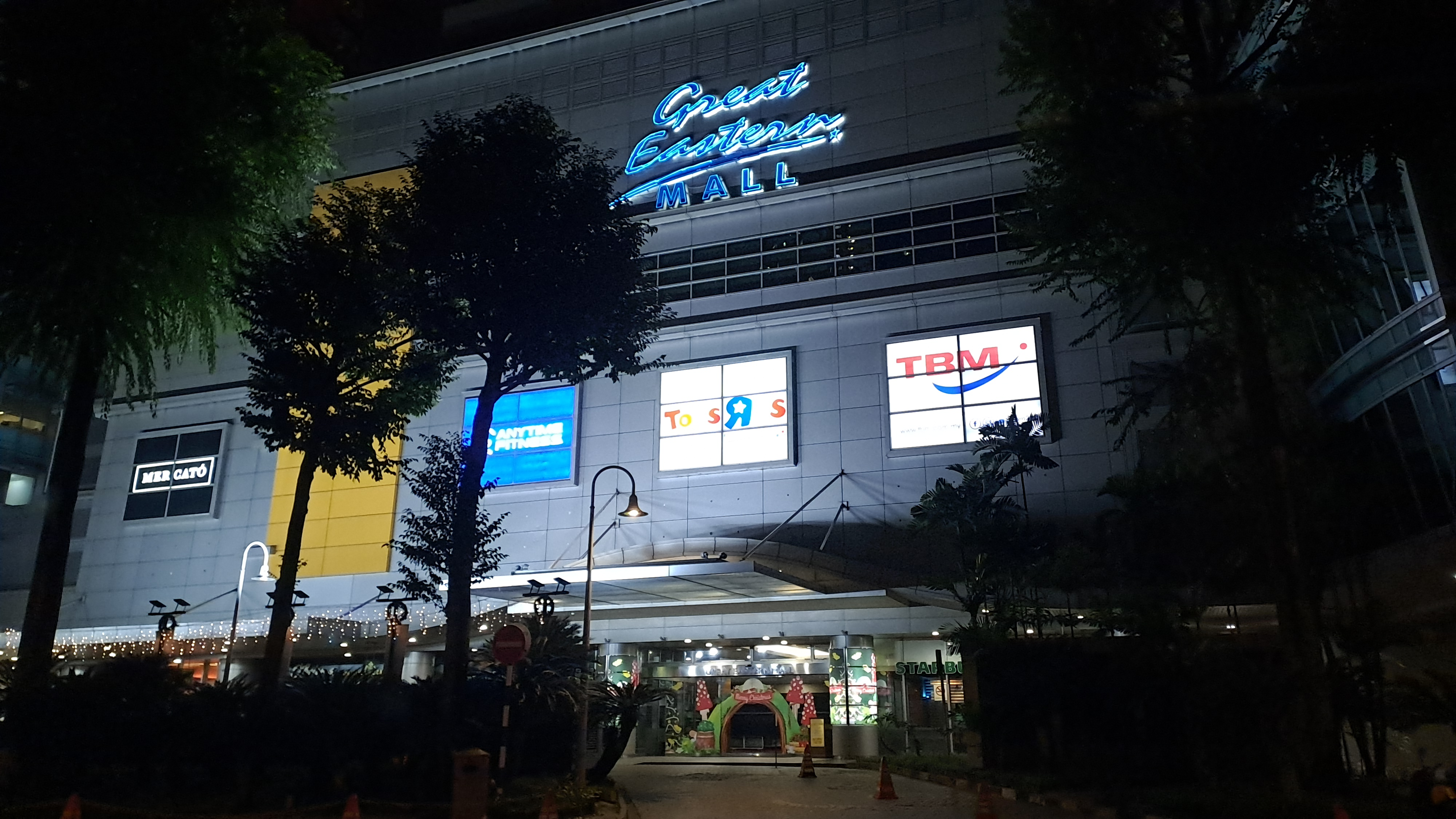
- Location: Jalan Ampang, Kuala Lumpur, Malaysia
- Management: Great Eastern Life
- Owner: Great Eastern Life
- Floor area: 443,269 sq ft (41,181.0 m^{2}).

The Great Eastern Tower (also known as Menara Great Eastern) in Kuala Lumpur, Malaysia, is the headquarters of Great Eastern Life Assurance (M) Bhd, a member of Great Eastern Holdings Ltd in Singapore. It is located along Jalan Ampang. The building includes a 20-story office tower as well as an 8-story podium block named the Great Eastern Mall.

Out of the 8 floors of the podium, 6 floors are dedicated retail floors whereas the remaining 2 upper floors house the client's training centre complete with multi-purpose hall and seminar rooms, a childcare centre as well as recreational facilities that include a gymnasium and squash court.

== See also ==
- List of skyscrapers
