= National Library of Malaysia =

National library in Kuala Lumpur, Malaysia

- Perpustakaan Negara Malaysia ڤرڤوستاكان نڬارا مليسيا
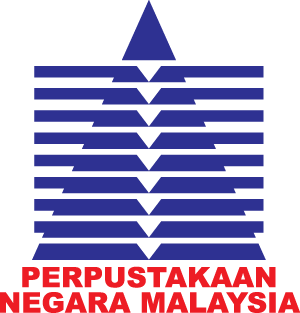

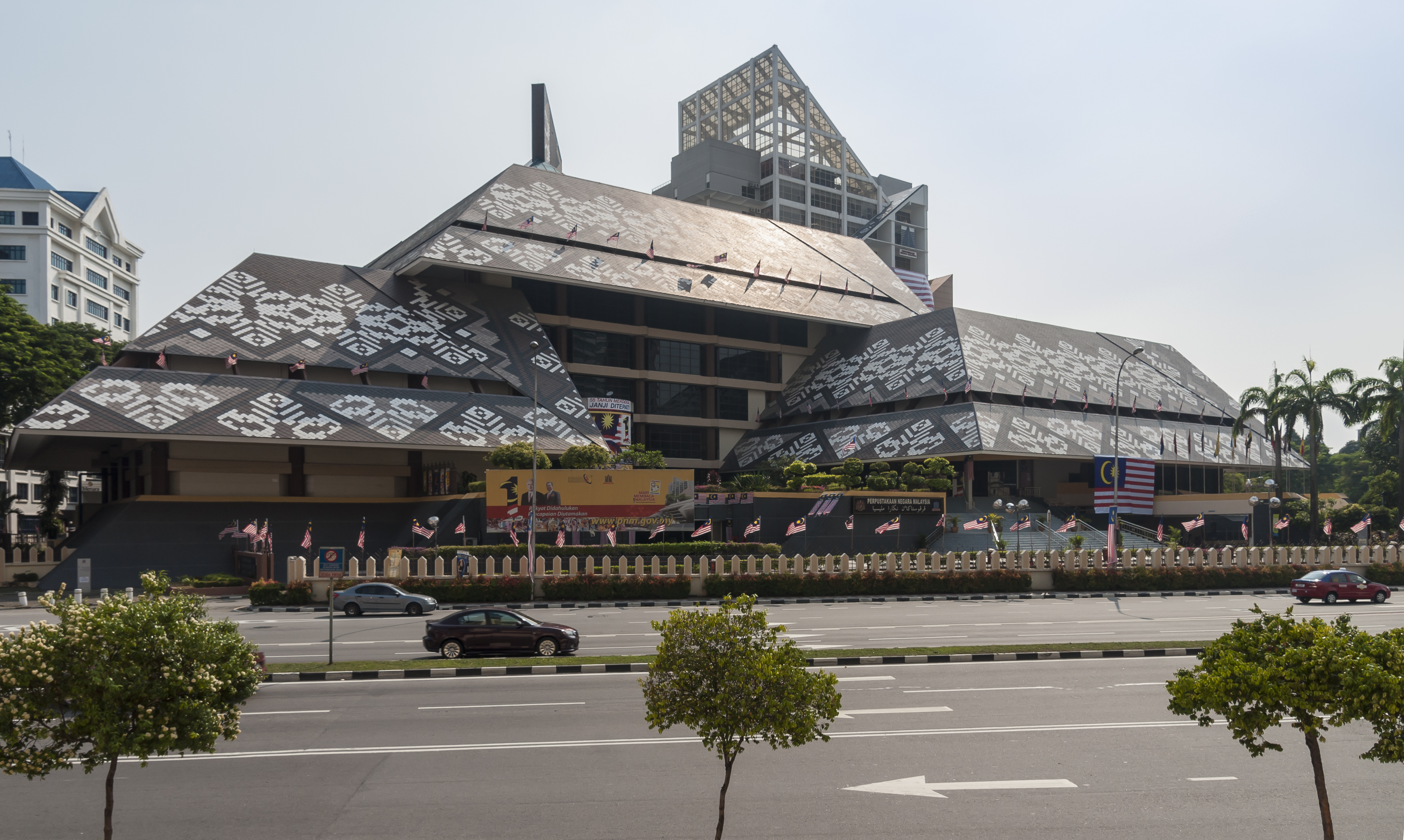
- 3.170368°N 101.711207°E
- Location: 232, Jalan Tun Razak; Kuala Lumpur, Malaysia, Malaysia
- Type: Library
- Established: 1966 (60 years ago)

Collection
- Size: 4.78M items
- Legal deposit: yes

Other information
- Director: Edy Irwan bin Zulkafli
- Employees: 500
- Website: www.pnm.gov.my

The National Library of Malaysia (Malay: Perpustakaan Negara Malaysia) (PNM) is a library established under the National Library Act 1972 in Kuala Lumpur, Malaysia.

The National Library is responsible for providing a collection of knowledge at national level for the present and future generations. In its effort to strengthen the library's collection, the National Library continues to play an active role in its acquisition of library materials through enforcement of the Deposit of Library Material Act 1986, acquisition, gift and exchange.

The pride of the National Library's collection is the Malaysiana Collection. It comprises library materials published in Malaysia and overseas whose whole or larger part of the content is related to the publications date or the language used. Another national intellectual heritage is the Malay Manuscripts and one of her manuscript the Hikayat Hang Tuah has been acknowledged by UNESCO in the Memory of the World Register. It is a MS ISO 9001:2015 certified library.

== Function ==
The main function of the National Library of Malaysia is divided into three (3) main activity that is Management Activity, Library Development Activity and Information Services Activity. Each Activities supported by sub-activity or division to achieve its goals and objectives of the National Library of Malaysia.

(a) Management Activity

- Management and Human Resource
- Planning and Corporate Communications

(b) Library Development Activity

- Information Knowledge Network
- National Collection Development and Documentation

(c) Library Services Activity

- Malaysiana Services
- General Information Services
- PERDANA Services

== Collection ==
The National Library holds a total collection of 4.78 million units; of which 4.52 million are printed materials, 98,406 are non-printed materials, 4,974 are Malay manuscripts and 158,316 are digital materials.

The major role of a National Library is to preserve and expand the use of published collection from within a respective country as well as collection published in other countries that relates to it. As the National Library for Malaysia, this institution is the central repository for Malaysia's historical memory and culture as well as a library that stores, documentation and conserve intellectual achievement that has been translated into print and non-print form. The Malaysiana collection is a collection of national heritage and the Malaysian race.

The National Library collection consists of the following:

- Malaysiana Collection (e.g.: Ephemeral Collection, Private Collection, etc.);
- Non-Malaysiana Collection (e.g.: ASEAN Collection, Harvard Collection, United Nations Collection, etc.);
- Malay Manuscripts Collection;
- Rare Collection;
- Serials Collection (e.g.: magazines, newspapers, journals, etc.);
- Electronic Media Collections;
- Commercial databases.

=== Malay Manuscript Collection ===
Malay Manuscript is defined as a handwritten document in the Malay language in the Jawi script which surfaced in the beginning of the fourteenth century and ended in early twentieth century. It is an invaluable documentary heritage of the past which should be saved, stored and preserved. Since the early days when the Malays first learned how to write and particularly during the period when Islam penetrated into the Malay world, thousands of Malay manuscripts were produced covering a wide range of subjects spanning from literature encompassing prose and poem, history, religious Islamic teachings, law, medicine, beliefs and premonitions to court customs and administration reflecting the rich cultural heritage and high intellectual attainment of the Malays.

Malay Manuscript Reference Service is located at the Centre of Malay Manuscript, 11th floor of Menara PNM, National Library of Malaysia. Established in 1985, Apart from the Malay manuscripts collection, NLM also provides manuscripts in microfilm form. Any photocopies from microfilm are provided with a charge.

=== Rare Collection ===
Rare collection includes materials issued from within and outside the country published before 1900 and / or materials that have been printed out and is no longer available on the market. This collection covers a variety of subjects such as history, language, literature, social sciences, economics, religion, etc. It contains a source of knowledge in the form of books, pamphlets and photographs which is rare, valuable and scarce. Rare Collection is located in

=== Ephemeral Collection ===
The Ephemeral collection was started in 1995 and is located in the Special Collection Room on Level 8, Menara PNM. It consists of publications from various departments and ministries, including postcards, brochures, program books, posters, calendars, first day stamps and envelopes.

=== Private Collection ===
The Private Collection was started in 1994, containing information on historical figures. This collection is a compilation of individual works or private collections of notable figures covering various subjects such as arts and literature, history, architecture, religion, culture and others. Private collection acquired by the National Library of Malaysia is used for conservation and reference. The field items materials are collected according to favorites, interests or areas of the collection owner. Private collection that available at the National Library of Malaysia are books, journals, articles, manuscripts, documents, pamphlets, genealogy, photos, letters, newspaper clippings, files, drawings, charts, and brochures. All of these collections can be referred at Level 10, Menara PNM. The collections were obtained from well-known figures including John Bastin, A. Halim Nasir, Abdul Rahman Al-Ahmadi, Che Ismail Che Daud, Pak Sako, Aziz Jahpin, Cerita Cina Peranakan, Abdul Karim Abdullah, Mohd Idris Kamaruddin, Naharuddin Haji Ali and A. Samad Said.

=== Electronic Media Collection ===
This is a resource collection of non-printed materials in various subject fields and formats such as audio cassettes, audio disc, video cassette, video disc, digital video disc, data compact disc (CD-ROM) and kits that are published in Malaysia and overseas. This collection is available at the Digital Services Section, Central Block on Level 4 of PNM Building (Anjung Bestari).

=== ASEAN Collection ===
ASEAN (Association of Southeast Asian Nations) Collection consists of a collection of countries in Southeast Asia, which are the members of ASEAN including Malaysia, Singapore, Indonesia, Thailand, Philippines, Cambodia, Laos, Myanmar, Brunei Darussalam and Vietnam. This collection covers various fields and things of ASEAN country such as social, cultural, economic, political and national heritage building. This collection is located at the Centre Block on Level 3 of National Library of Malaysia Building.

=== Harvard Collection ===
Materials in this collection consist of books, serial publications and media resources. This collection covers materials published by Harvard University Press, Harvard Business School and Harvard Business Publishing. This Harvard Collection is located on Level 3 of the PNM Building.

=== United Nations Collection ===
National Library of Malaysia is the depository centre for United Nation publications since 1976. Its agencies such as United Nations Educational, Scientific and Cultural Organization (UNESCO), Food and Agriculture Organization of the United Nations (FAO), United Nations Children's Fund (UNICEF) and others. This collection consists of books, serial publications, proceedings, prospectus, news bulletins and brochures. In February 2011, NLM was appointed to be the depository centre for United Nation. Special Collections of United Nations Organization can be referred to at Level 3 of Anjung Bestari.

== Building ==
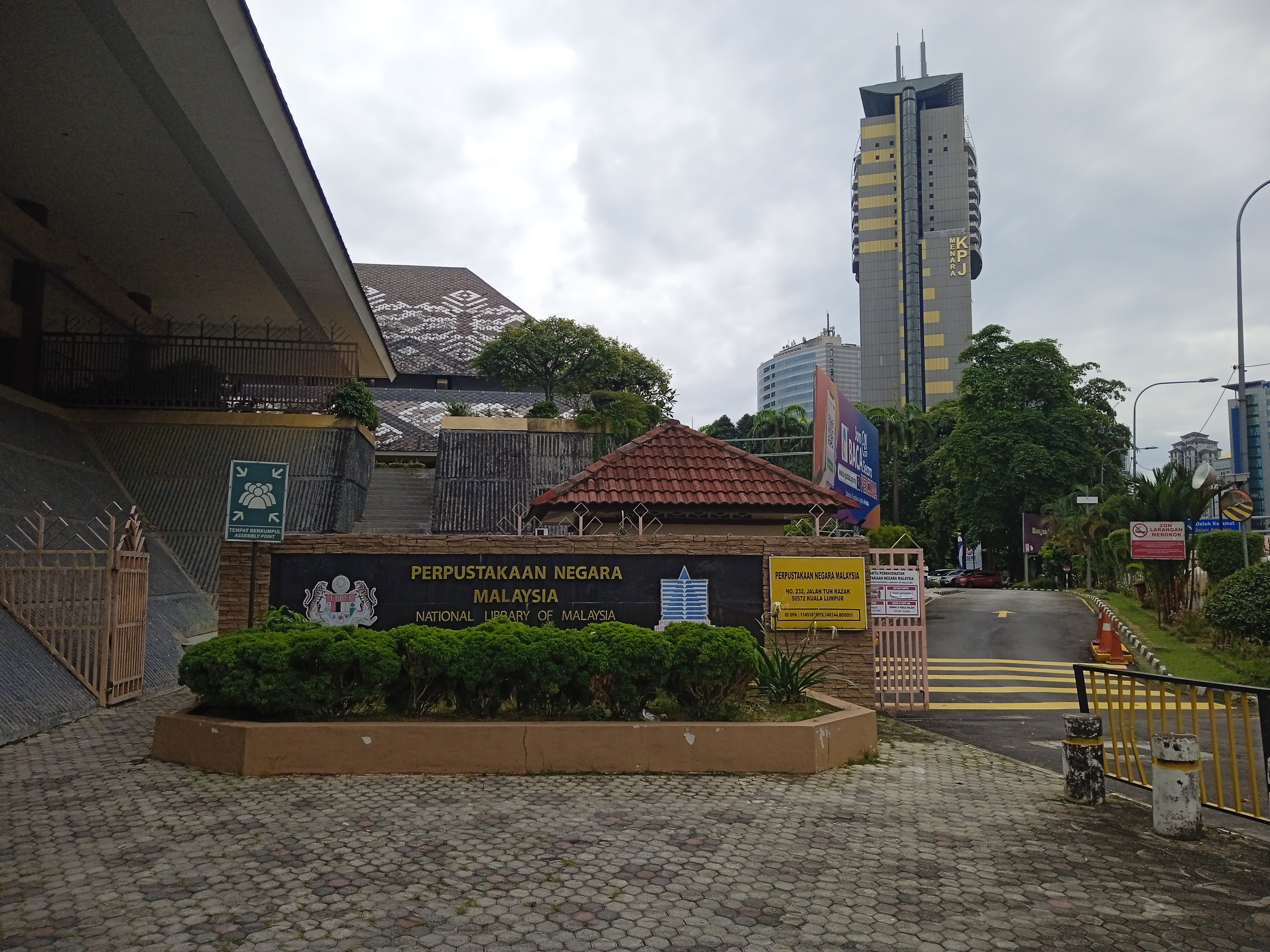
Jalan Tun Razak entrance of National Library

The building design and concept reflecting Malaysian identity that symbolises intellectual achievement plus inspiration from the national's rich cultural heritage. The concept of the mind lends its touch in the architecture of the interior. The design is based on the concept of the traditional Malay headgear the tengkolok which is a symbol of intellectual pride and respect in Malaysian culture. The tiles on the roof are also unique containing patterns inspired by the Kain Songket (traditional hand woven cloth).

The National Library of Malaysia moved to the building in February 1993 after many years at Jalan Raja Laut.

The architectural firm responsible for the design of the National Library of Malaysia's building at Jalan Tun Razak, Kuala Lumpur is Kumpulan Akitek.

== Public transport ==
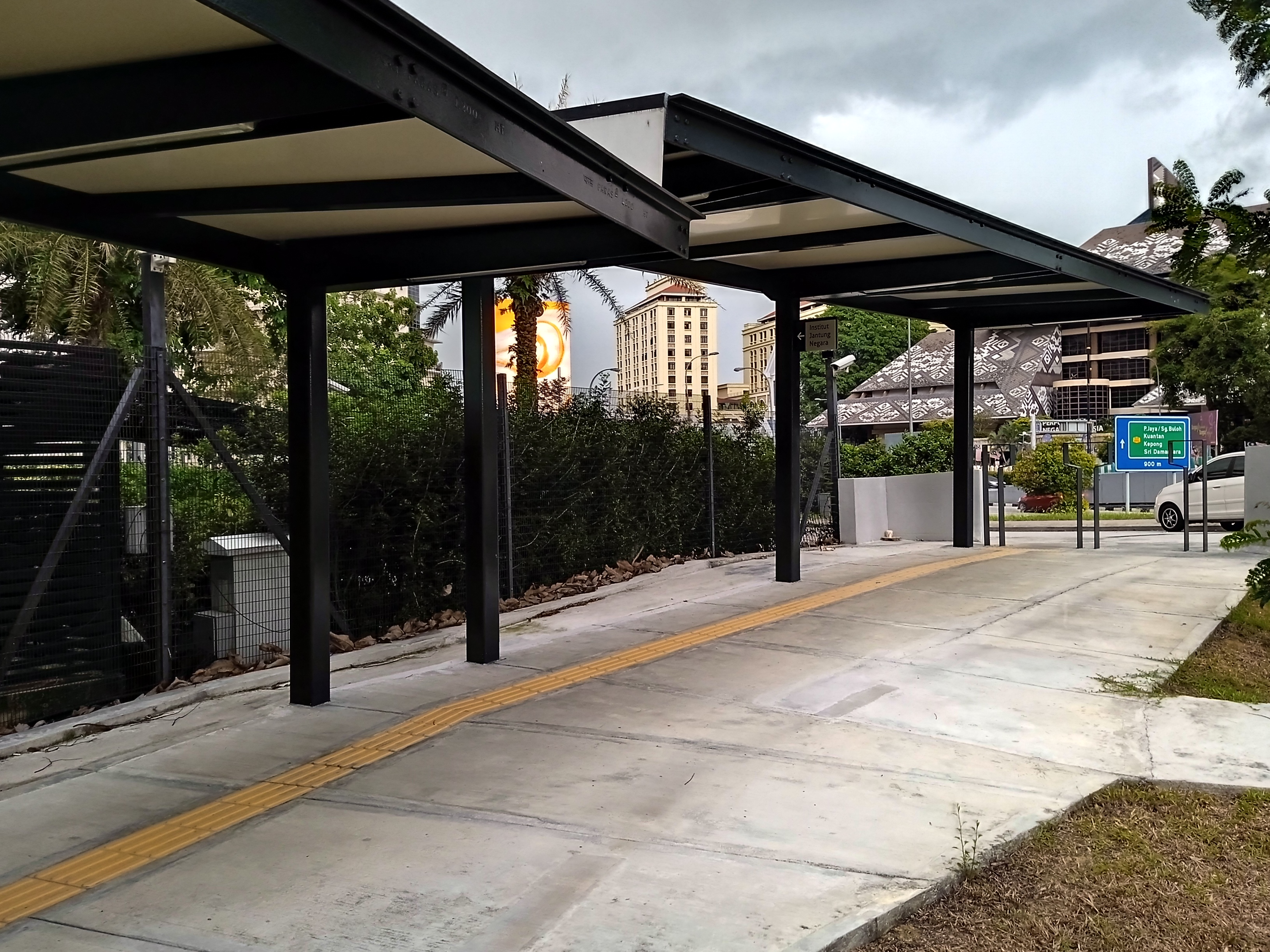
Covered walkway from Raja Uda–UTM MRT station to National Library, via Entrance B.

RapidKL bus 402 or Go KL Orange Line from Titiwangsa bus hub.

It is accessible via a 5-minute walk from Raja Uda–UTM MRT station on the Putrajaya Line. It also a 20 to 25-minute walk from Titiwangsa Station of the STAR LRT Line.

== See also ==
- List of libraries in Malaysia
