= Ampang Park MRT station =

MRT station in Kuala Lumpur, Malaysia

Coordinates: 3°09′35″N 101°43′07″E

PY20 Ampang Park
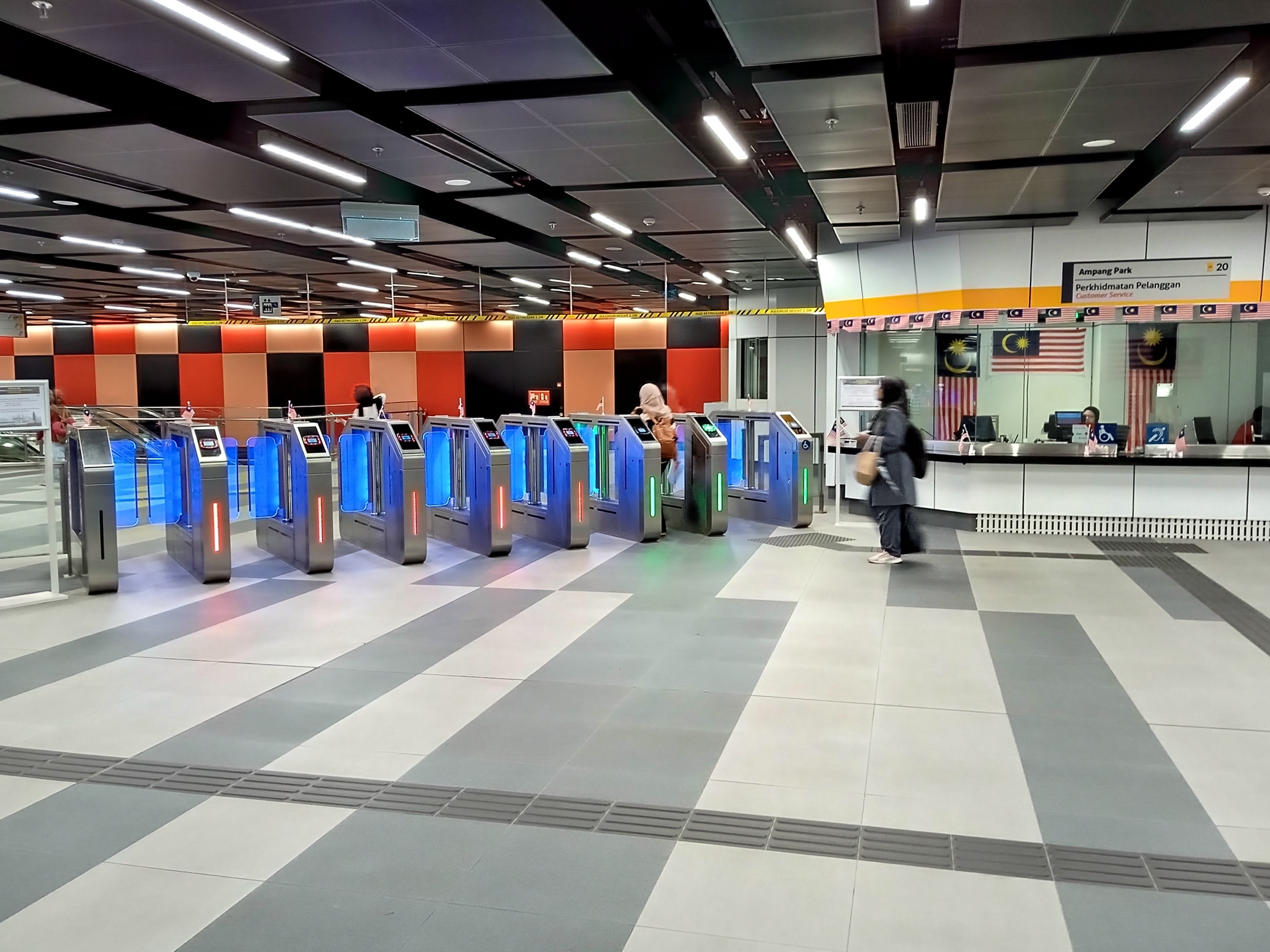
- Ampang Park MRT station concourse featuring the customer service counter and faregates.

General information
- Other names: Malay: امڤڠ ڤارك (Jawi); Chinese: 安邦坊; Tamil: அம்பாங் பார்க்
- Location: Jalan Ampang; 50450 Kuala Lumpur; Malaysia
- System: Rapid KL
- Owner: MRT Corp
- Operator: Rapid Rail
- Line: 12 Putrajaya Line
- Platforms: 2 stacked side platforms
- Tracks: 2
- Connections: Connecting station to KJ9 Ampang Park

Construction
- Structure type: Underground
- Depth: 44.4 metres (146 ft)
- Parking: Not available
- Cycle facilities: Not available
- Accessible: Yes

Other information
- Status: Operational
- Station code: PY20

History
- Opened: 16 March 2023; 3 years ago

Services
Preceding station		Following station
Raja Uda towards Kwasa Damansara	Putrajaya Line	Persiaran KLCC towards Putrajaya Sentral
Location

Ampang Park MRT station is an underground mass rapid transit (MRT) station in Kuala Lumpur that is served by Rapid KL's Putrajaya Line. The MRT station is named after and situated on the former site of the Ampang Park shopping centre as one of the three Putrajaya Line stations around the Kuala Lumpur City Centre (KLCC) subdistrict. It is also located opposite the Intermark Mall along the busy stretch of Jalan Ampang and Jalan Tun Razak.

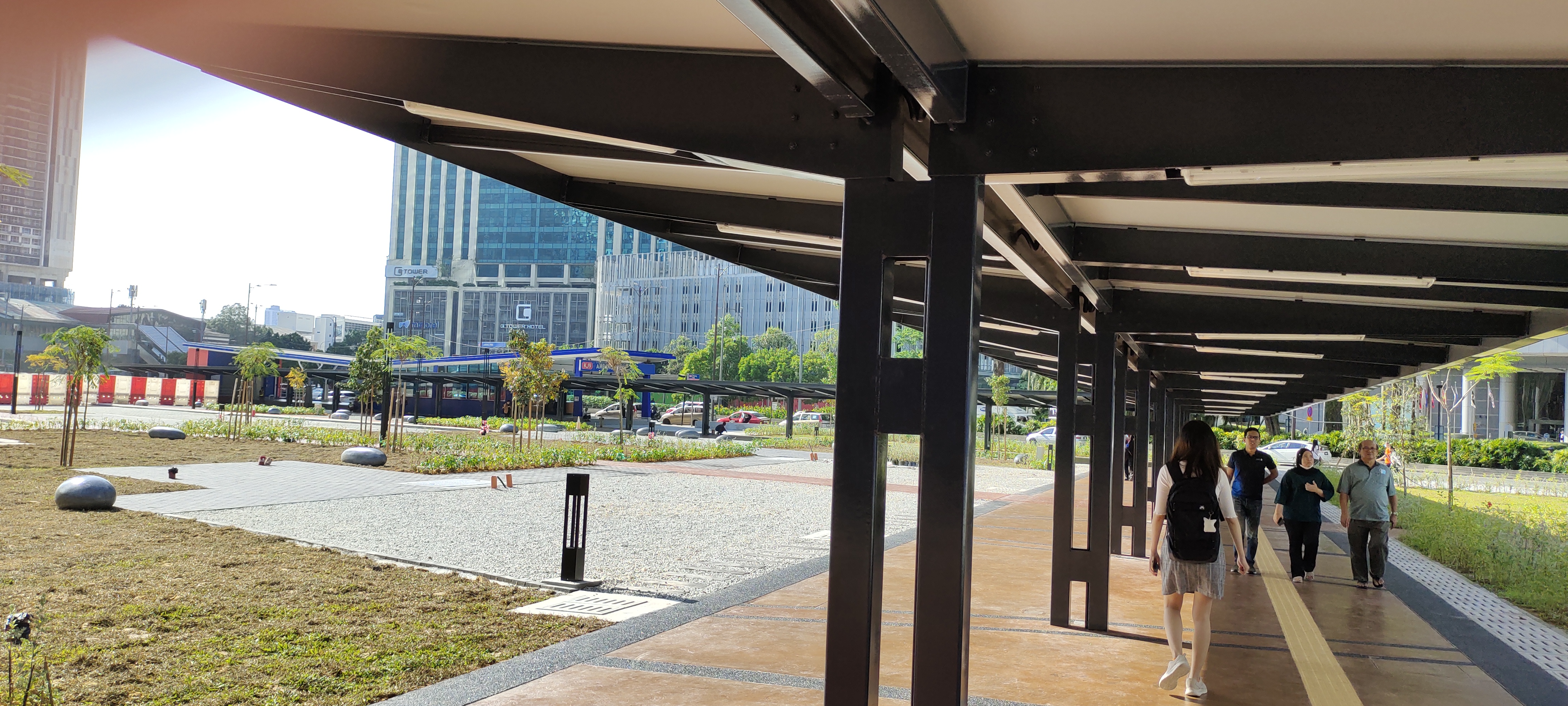
Pedestrian walkway from the MRT station to the LRT station

This MRT station, despite sharing the same name, is not integrated and not to be confused with the separate Ampang Park LRT station, which is served by the Kelana Jaya Line instead. Paid-zone integration was once proposed but not constructed at the moment due to cost-cutting measures. Passengers are required to tap out from one station, exit the station at ground level and walk along a covered walkway to the entrance of the other station to transfer between the lines. Thus, the stations are designated as connecting stations only on official transit maps.

== Layout ==
Proposed future direct access to the LRT station at Level B1

The escalators in the station is one of the longest among the underground stations on the Putrajaya Line

Paid-area interchange between the Kelana Jaya Line and the Putrajaya Line, both underground, was planned for the Ampang Park stations; the integration was scrapped in favour of an out-of-station interchange due to cost-cutting measures. Passengers will have to tap out from one line, resurface to ground level, and enter the other underground station when changing between the two lines with a 7 minutes walking time between platforms. The proposed integration would have been the first underground station transfer between two separate lines and stations in the rapid transit system of Kuala Lumpur.

The MRT station's Entrance A faces Jalan Tun Razak, opposite the KL Trillion commercial development and the Jalan Tun Razak fire station.

G	Street Level	Jalan Ampang, Jalan Tun Razak, Walkway to Ampang Park LRT Station
B1	Concourse	Staircase/Escalators/Lifts to and from Entrances, Shoplots, Ticketing Machines, Information counter, Faregates, Lifts to Platforms 1 and 2
B2	Concourse	Escalators/Lifts to Platforms 1 and 2, Future direct access to LRT station
B4	Split platform, Doors will open on the right
B4	Platform 1	12 Putrajaya Line towards PY41 Putrajaya Sentral (→)
B5	Split platform, Doors will open on the left
B5	Platform 2	12 Putrajaya Line towards PY01 Kwasa Damansara (←)

=== Exits and entrances ===
Putrajaya Line station
A	Jalan Tun Razak, Taxi and E-hailing Layby, KL Trillion, Menara Tokio Marine Life, Wisma UNIRAZAK
B	Ampang Park LRT station (north side) Jalan Ampang, Intermark Mall, Megan Avenue, Plaza OSK

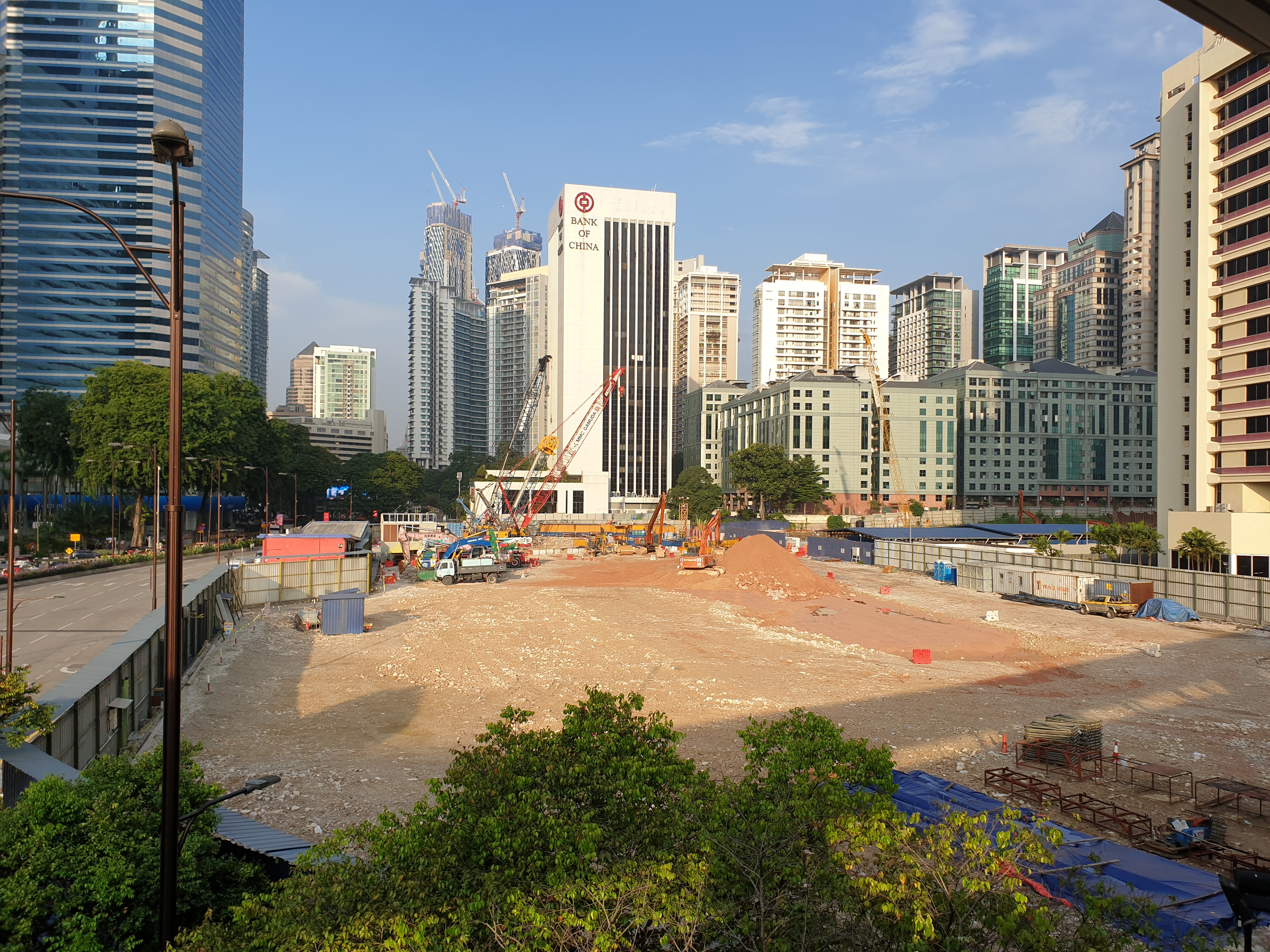
The under construction Ampang Park MRT station (2018)

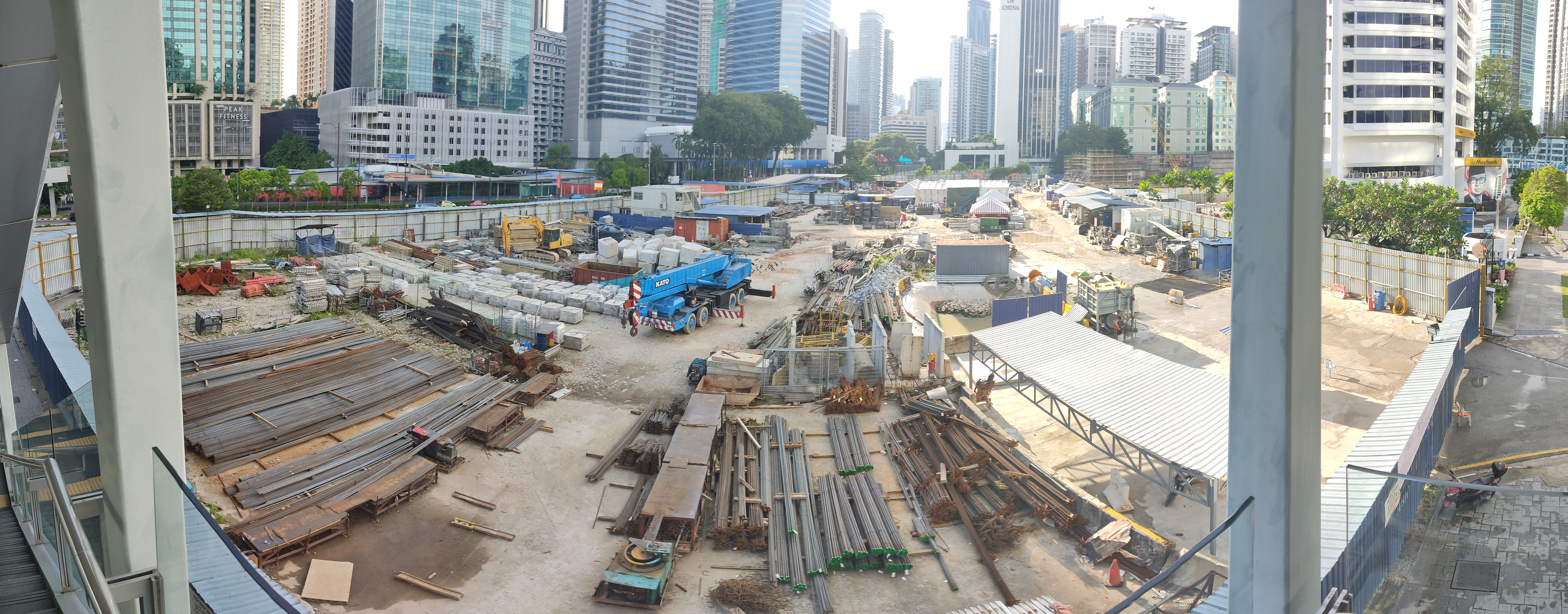
The under construction Ampang Park MRT station (2021)

== See also ==
- Rail transport in Malaysia
