= Ampang Park =

Shopping mall in Kuala Lumpur, Malaysia

Coordinates: 3.160736°N 101.718713°E

Ampang Park Shopping Centre
- Ampang Park as seen on 27 December 2017; 4 days prior to its closure
- Location: Jalan Ampang, Kuala Lumpur
- Address: Ampang Park Shopping Centre, Jalan Ampang, 50450 Kuala Lumpur
- Opened: 15 March 1973; 53 years ago
- Closed: 31 December 2017; 8 years ago
- Developer: Low Keng Huat Brothers Realty Sdn Bhd
- Manager: Ampang Park Management Corporation (1836)
- Architect: DP Architects and Thomas A.S. Tiang
- Num. of stores: 250+
- Floor area: 340,000 sq ft (32,000 m^{2})
- Floors: 5 floors, including basement and rooftop.
- Parking: Ground floor and basement.
- Website: www.ampangpark.com.my

Ampang Park Shopping Centre, also called Ampang Park, was a shopping centre located at Jalan Ampang in Kuala Lumpur. It was the first shopping centre to be built in Malaysia. It was designed by the architect of Singapore's People's Park Complex, the Design Partnership, in conjunction with the Kuala Lumpur-based architect Thomas A.S. Tiang. The developers were the Low Keng Huat Brothers Realty Sdn Bhd. Ampang Park was closed on 31 December 2017 and demolished in 2018 to make way for the construction of MRT Ampang Park Station which opened on 16 March 2023. Further redevelopment of the former site is yet to begin and the site currently serves as a temporary recreational park along with connecting walkway path to Ampang Park LRT station.

== Features ==
The mall opened in 1973 at a cost of RM 15 million. It was planned for a 4.5-acre (18,000 m^{2}) site, at the junction of Jalan Ampang and Jalan Pekeliling, in the Ampang residential district. In contrast to the tradition of shop lots which are oriented towards the street, the modern architecture faced inwards to an internal street, or atrium. It was initially planned to be fully air conditioned, but as built, the atrium was cooled via natural cross ventilation.

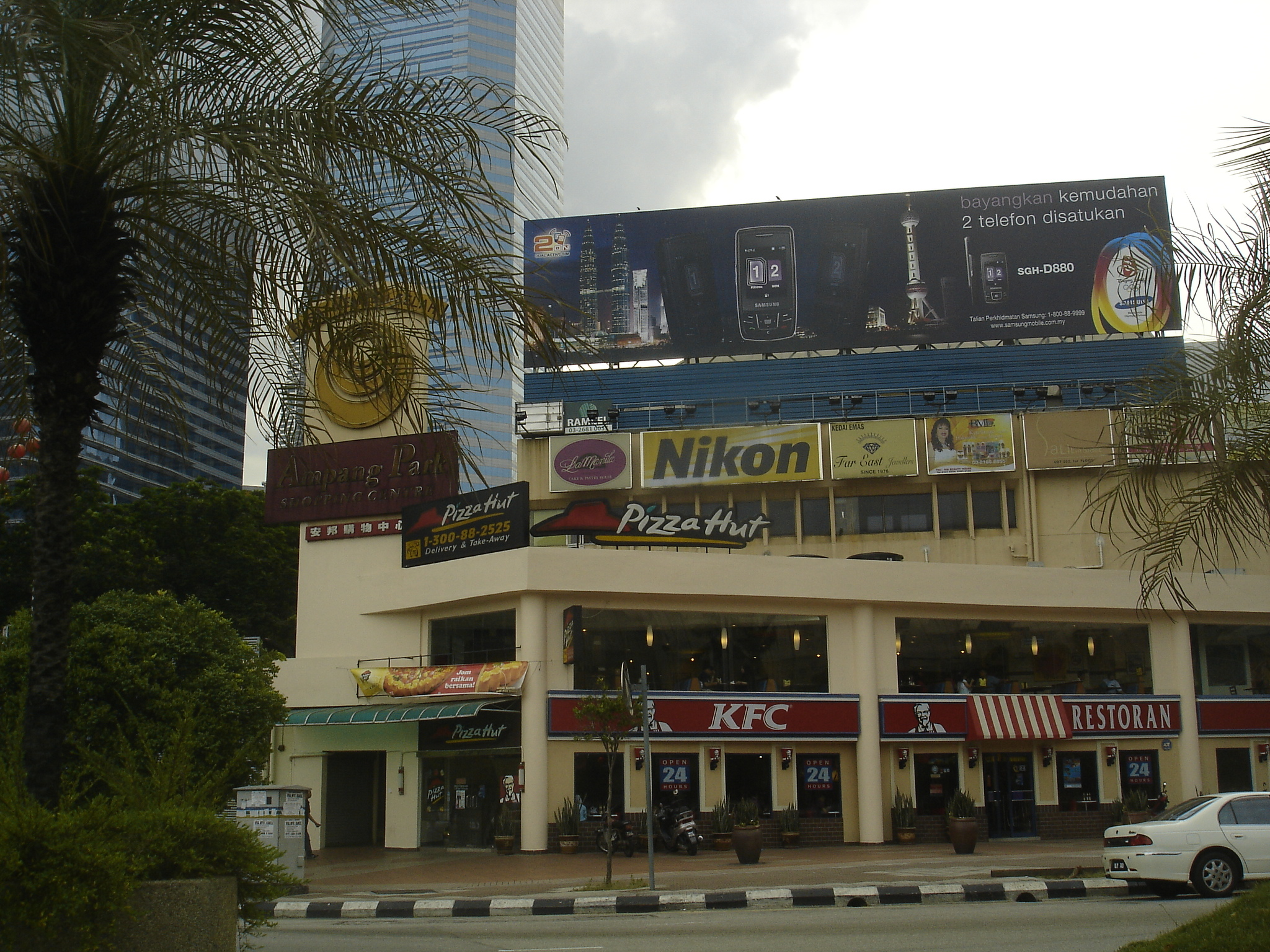
The old Ampang Park Shopping Center, side facing Jalan Tun Razak. Photo taken in 2008.

Its features included a carpark for 450 vehicles, a children's playground, an entertainment deck, an exhibition gallery, a "theatrette", and escalators and lifts.

== Transit ==
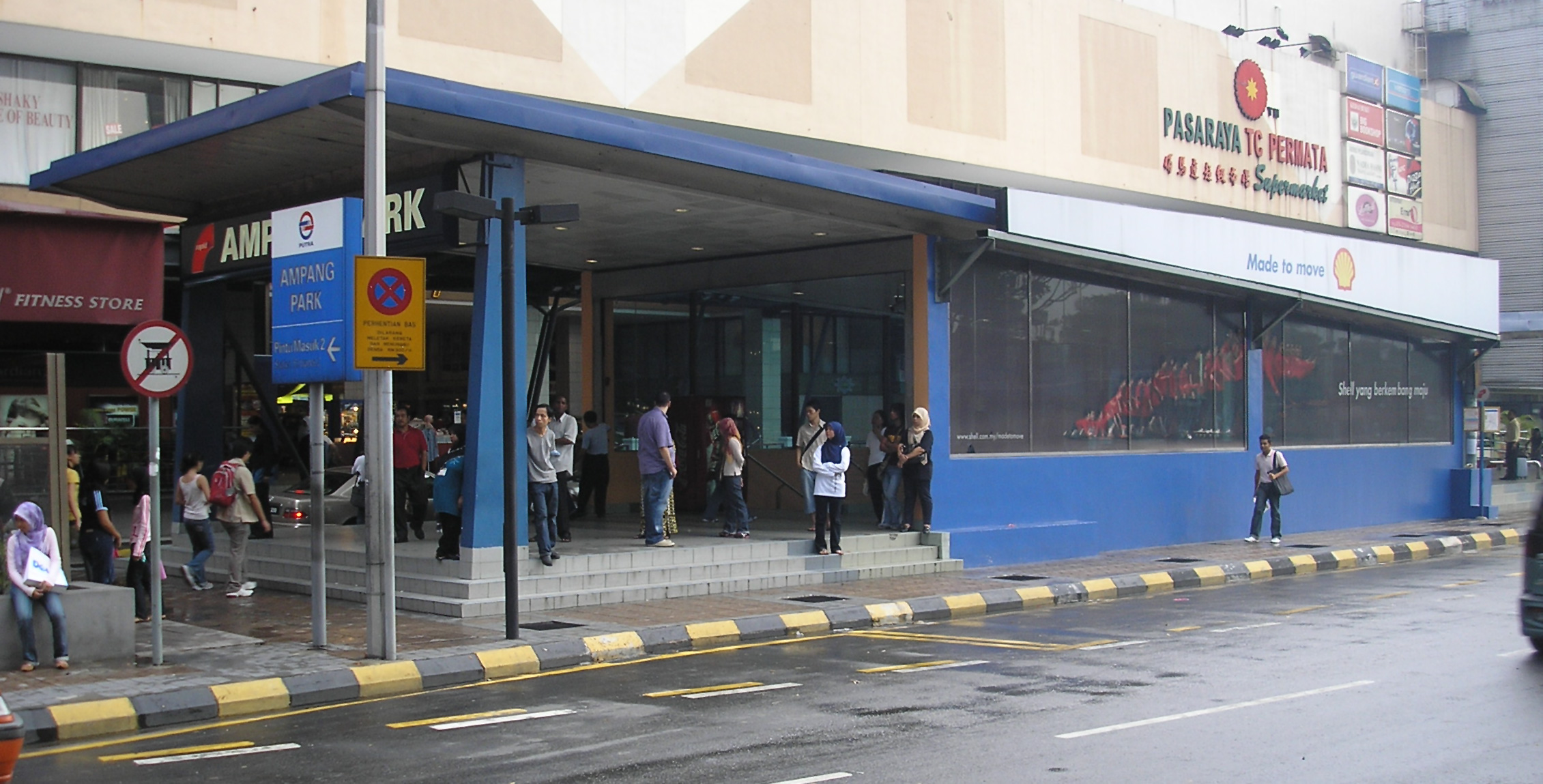
Ampang Park station (Kelana Jaya Line) (secondary exit)

The mall is connected to the Kelana Jaya Line by the Ampang Park LRT station. Ampang Park is also a bus hub for Ampang-bound buses, namely routes 300 and 303 which connect Ampang Park to KLCC and Ampang LRT station. It is also planned to be integrated with MRT SSP's Ampang Park MRT station.

== Demolition plans ==
In October 2015, news broke that the mall would be demolished to make way for MRT2 project. The tenants and shop owners of the mall suggested that the proposed MRT station be built underneath a field behind the shopping centre. Subsequently, the "Save Ampang Park" campaign was set up to urge the government to reconsider the demolition.

MRT Corp gave two options for the strata owners: land acquisition or mutual agreement whereby the MRT Corp would demolish Ampang Park Shopping Centre and build a new shopping centre for the owners once the Ampang Park MRT project was completed in seven years. On 6 November 2015, MRT Corp announced that the mall was spared from demolition, following a new design option for its Ampang Park station. However, with the new design, a full physical integration between the MRT Ampang Park station and the Light Rail Transit (LRT) Ampang Park station could not be constructed.

On 18 January 2017, Court of Appeal dismissed a judicial review application by 39 strata owners of the shopping centre against the land acquisition for the Klang Valley Mass Rapid Transit (MRT) Ampang Park station project.

== Closure and demolition ==
As a result of following the review dismissal, demolition or potential land acquisition for Ampang Park proceeded. On 29 November 2017, all tenants were notified that Ampang Park would cease operations on 31 December, as the power and water supplies would be cut off at midnight. By Christmas, 70% of tenants had moved out, while others opted to remain until the last day of operations.

In the final days leading up to its closure, Ampang Park was crowded with visitors taking their last pictures while some others were taking their advantages of clearance sales.

Ampang Park was closed for good after almost 45 years of operation on 31 December 2017; dismantling works began soon after. In January 2018, ceiling, fixtures and electrical wiring were being removed in the mall's interior, which raised public safety concerns. On 23 January 2018, MRT Corp released a statement disassociating itself from any dismantling works in the mall, as the land acquisition for Ampang Park was still ongoing. A police report was made before the statement released. After the land acquisition completed, Ampang Park was surrounded by fences before the demolition began in May 2018 and completed in September 2018.

== Skate park ==
As of August 2023, a skate park had been constructed on the site.

== In popular culture ==
The shopping complex was featured in the third season of The Amazing Race as a location that contestants must reach (specifically, a photography shop known as "Citifoto") to develop photographs of the Petronas Twin Towers. Teams had a hard time finding this shopping mall, so they asked local Malaysians to help them to get there.

== See also ==
- List of shopping malls in Malaysia
