= Jalan Ampang =

Road in Kuala Lumpur, Malaysia

Selangor Route 31
- Jalan Ampang

Major junctions
- West end: Kuala Lumpur, Jalan Melaka
- Kuala Lumpur Inner Ring Road (Jalan Sultan Ismail); Ampang–Kuala Lumpur Elevated Highway; Kuala Lumpur Middle Ring Road 1 (Jalan Tun Razak); Jalan Jelatek; FT 28 Kuala Lumpur Middle Ring Road 2 Sungai Besi–Ulu Klang Elevated Expressway; Jalan Taman Putra; Jalan Lembah Jaya
- East end: Ampang, Selangor

Location
- Country: Malaysia
- Primary destinations: KLCC, Kampung Datuk Keramat, Setiawangsa, Setapak, Ulu Klang, Hulu Langat

Highway system
- Highways in Malaysia; Expressways; Federal; State

Jalan Ampang or Ampang Road (Selangor state route B31) is a major road in the Klang Valley region, Selangor and the Federal Territory of Kuala Lumpur, Malaysia. Built in the 1880s, it is one of the oldest roads in the Klang Valley. It is a main road to Ampang Jaya and is easily accessible from Jalan Tun Razak or Jalan Ulu Klang (now part of the Kuala Lumpur Middle Ring Road 2 Route 28) from the Hulu Kelang or Setapak direction. It is also accessible from Cheras through Jalan Shamelin, from Jalan Tun Razak through Jalan Kampung Pandan via Taman Cempaka, from Kampung Pandan through Jalan Kampung Pandan Dalam via Taman Nirwana, from the Kuala Lumpur Middle Ring Road 2 via Pandan Indah and Taman Kencana and from Hulu Langat town through the mountain pass. Wangsa Maju, Setapak, central Kuala Lumpur, Ampang Park and Salak South surround Ampang. Jalan Ampang became the backbone of the road system linking Ampang to Kuala Lumpur before being surpassed by the Ampang-Kuala Lumpur Elevated Highway (AKLEH) in 2001.

== History ==
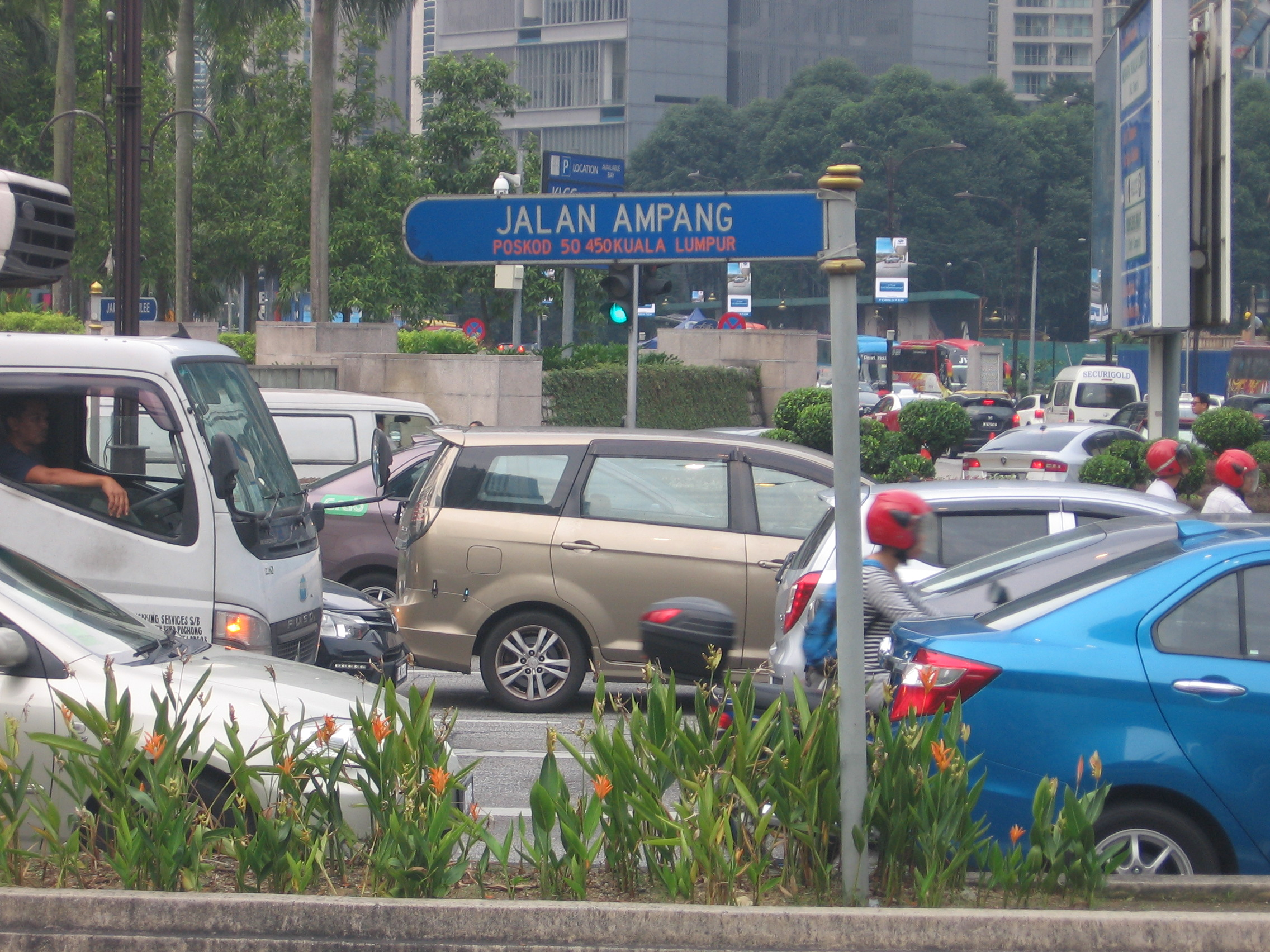
A road sign on Jalan Ampang

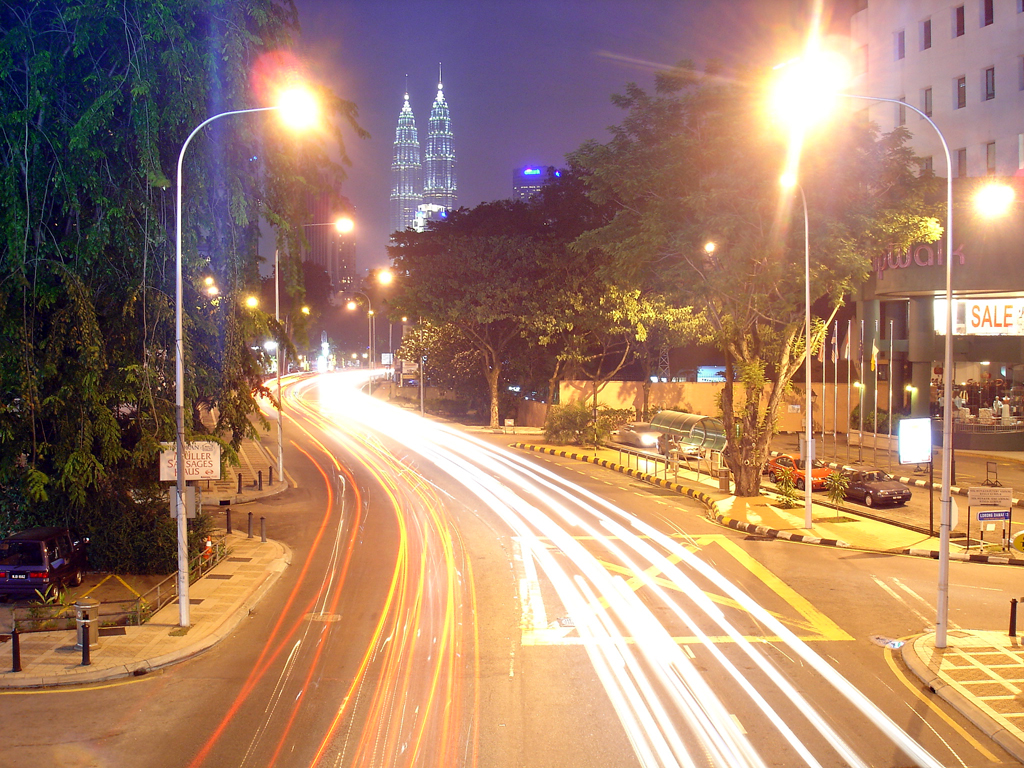
Jalan Ampang at night

Kuala Lumpur was founded in 1857 at the confluence of the Sungei Lumpur (now Gombak River) and the Klang River, which now houses the Kuala Lumpur Jamek Mosque. In 1849, Raja Abdullah acquired large sum of money from Chee Yam Chuan and other merchants from Malacca to start operation of tin mines in Ampang, granted by Sultan Muhammad. This soon attracted other Chinese shopkeepers which led to turning the isolated jungle settlement into a small town, of which Ampang, one of the earliest areas in the Klang Valley, opened for tin mining.

Ampang Road, as it was called then, has existed since the 1880s. It is one of Kuala Lumpur's earliest roads, leading from the tin mining village of Ampang to the heart of the city along the Ampang River. The road was widened in 1888 by G. T. Tickell, the then chairman of the Kuala Lumpur Sanitary Board. In Kuala Lumpur, the street then led on to Ampang Street (now known as Leboh Ampang) to its Chinese shophouses and the Malay village of Kampung Rawa (today known as Kampung Baru).

The old Ampang Road also housed the Selangor Turf Club (present grounds of the Petronas Twin Towers) and the Griffin Inn (an old colonial bar and night-club). Adjoining and across from these properties, the houses and land were owned by Loke Chow Kit. The latter (owner of Chow Kit & Co, a department store) had his country-residence at the corner of Ampang Road and Treacher Road. Other notables who lived on Ampang Road were the families of Choo Kia Peng and Chan Chin Mun and The Bok and The Khoo families.

=== Pekan Ampang ===
Pekan Ampang, the historical town centre of Ampang Jaya, is situated approximately 3 km from Kampung Lembah Jaya small village. The architecture of the town shares similarities with most towns and cities elsewhere in Malaya during the British colonial period. Pekan Ampang is still administratively a separate town, falling under the Ampang Jaya Municipal Council, but it was often included as part of the metropolitan area of Kuala Lumpur.

== Features ==
=== Notable features ===
- Pekan Ampang and Pekan Batu Ampat Ampang, a town along the road.
- There are five rapid transit stations along this road going west to east: Dang Wangi LRT station, KLCC LRT station, Ampang Park LRT station, Ampang Park MRT station and Ampang LRT station.
- Jalan Ampang Muslim Cemetery

==== Major landmarks along the road ====
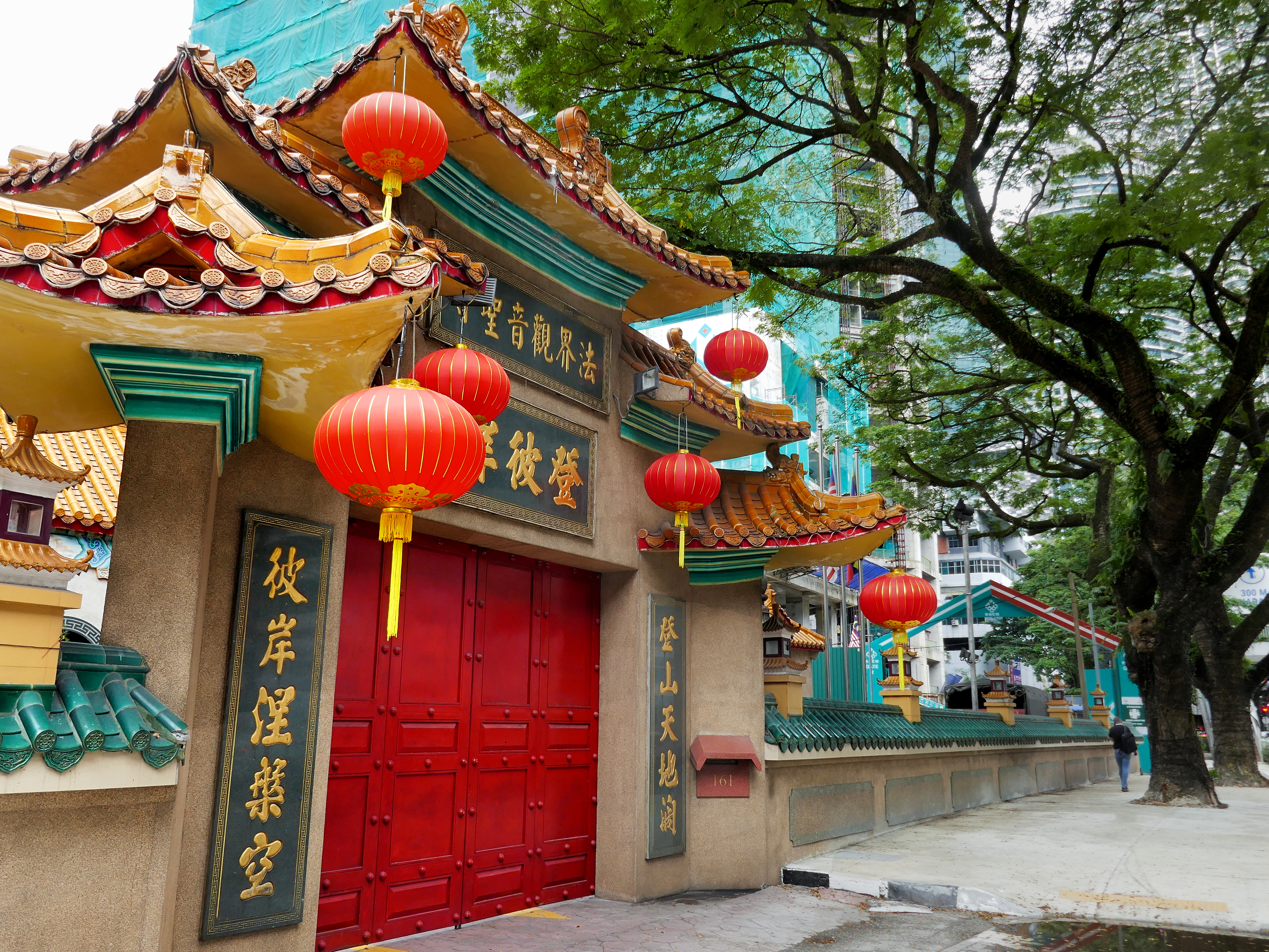
The Entrance to the Dharma Realm Guan Yin Monastery.

- 3rdNvenue Neu Suites near to Korean Embassy (Embassy Row) (KLCC)
- Great Eastern Mall
- Petronas Twin Towers at Kuala Lumpur City Centre (KLCC)
- InterContinental Kuala Lumpur
- Menara Citibank
- Empire Tower
- M Suites 283 Jalan Ampang
- Great Eastern Tower
- Wisma Denmark
- Suria KLCC
- The Dharma Realm Guan Yin Monastery
- Several shopping malls such as the Ampang Park (now closed), City Square, Suria KLCC and Great Eastern Mall are located along the road which also include Zouk Nightclub
- M-City Jalan Ampang
- Gleneagles Hospital Kuala Lumpur

== Maintenance ==
In Kuala Lumpur, the roads are maintained by Dewan Bandaraya Kuala Lumpur or Kuala Lumpur City Hall (DBKL). In Selangor side, the roads are maintained by the Malaysian Public Works Department (JKR) and Majlis Perbandaran Ampang Jaya (MPAJ).

== Course ==
The road generally runs in an east–west direction, starting from the junction of Leboh Ampang and Jalan Gereja in the Masjid Jamek area. The road continues northeastward, passing Bukit Nanas on the north side of the hill and following the Klang River until Dang Wangi, where the river turns north. The road keeps running eastward past Wisma Denmark and the Petronas Twin Towers, past embassy row until it reaches the eastern KL suburb of Ampang.

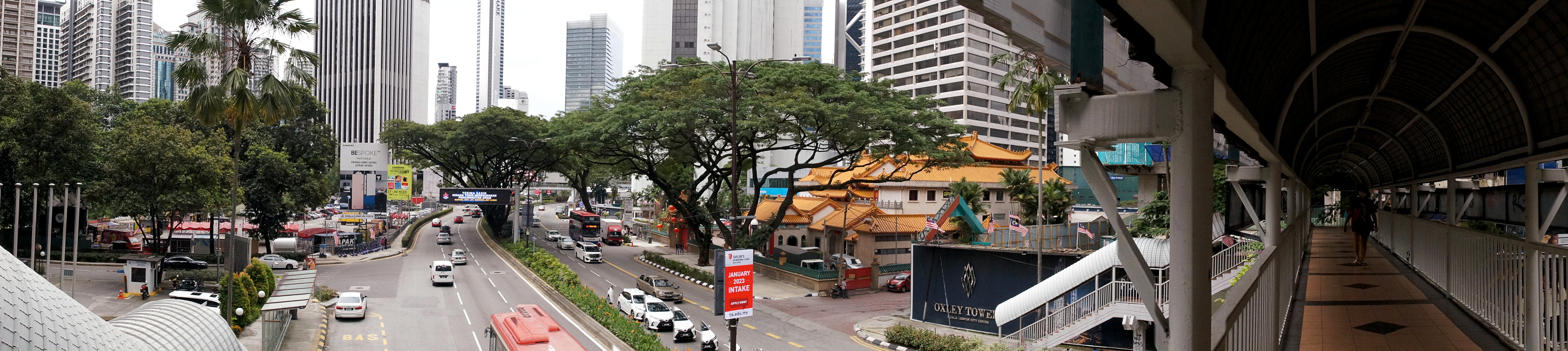
View of Ampang Road in 2022 from near the Dharma Realm Guan Yin Monastery.

== Junction lists ==
Legend:

- I/C - Interchange, I/S - Intersection, RSA - Rest and service area, OBR - Overhead bridge restaurant, R/R - Restaurant and rest plaza, L/B - Layby, V/P - Vista point, TN - tunnel, T/P - Toll plaza, BR - Bridge
- C - Cloverleaf, S - Stack, T-A - Trumpet-A, T-B - Trumpet-B, DT - Directional-T/Y, SDT - Semi-Directional-T/Y, P-Y - Partial-Y, D - Diamond, P-C - Partial cloverleaf, D-D - Diverging diamond, D-R - Direct ramp

State/territory	District	Location	km	mi	Name	Destinations	Notes
Kuala Lumpur	N/A	Bukit Bintang			Kuala Lumpur; Jalan Melaka	Jalan Melaka (Malacca Road) – Jalan Tun H S Lee, Jalan Tun Perak, Jalan Pudu, Jalan Raja Chulan	T-junctions
Kuala Lumpur	N/A	Bukit Bintang			Kuala Lumpur; Jalan Munshi Abdullah	Jalan Munshi Abdullah (Jalan --) – Jalan Dang Wangi, Jalan Tuanku Abdul Rahman	T-junctions
Kuala Lumpur	N/A	Bukit Bintang			Kuala Lumpur; Jalan Dang Wangi	Jalan Dang Wangi (Jalan Campbell)	T-junctions; No entry
Kuala Lumpur	N/A	Bukit Bintang			Kelana Jaya Line 5	KJ12 Dang Wangi LRT station	
Kuala Lumpur	N/A	Bukit Bintang			Jalan Sultan Ismail-AKLEH		No entry
Kuala Lumpur	N/A	Bukit Bintang			Menara Safuan		
Kuala Lumpur	N/A	Bukit Bintang			Wisma Denmark	(Denmark) Royal Danish Embassy	
Kuala Lumpur	N/A	Bukit Bintang			Kuala Lumpur; Jalan Sultan Ismail	Kuala Lumpur Inner Ring Road; Jalan Sultan Ismail (Jalan Treacher) – Jalan Raja Laut, Jalan Tunku Abdul Rahman; Ampang–Kuala Lumpur Elevated Highway – Ampang, Ulu Klang, KLCC, Cheras; Jalan P. Ramlee – Jalan Raja Chulan, Jalan Bukit Bintang	Junctions
Kuala Lumpur	N/A	Bukit Bintang			Reinassance Kuala Lumpur Hotel		
Kuala Lumpur	N/A	Bukit Bintang			Pakistan High Commission		
Kuala Lumpur	N/A	Bukit Bintang			Jalan Ampang Muslim Cemetery	Jalan Ampang Muslim Cemetery – * Grave of P. Ramlee and Saloma	For Muslims only
Kuala Lumpur	N/A	Bukit Bintang			Malaysia Tourist Centre; Saloma Bistro		
Kuala Lumpur	N/A	Bukit Bintang			Wisma Selangor Dredging	Embassy of the Kingdom of Morocco	
Kuala Lumpur	N/A	Bukit Bintang			Public Bank Tower		
Kuala Lumpur	N/A	Bukit Bintang			Kuala Lumpur; KLCC	Jalan Yap Kwan Seng (Yap Kwan Seng Road) – Jalan Tun Razak; Jalan P Ramlee (Jalan Parry) – Jalan Sultan Ismail, Jalan Pinang, KLCC	Junctions
Kuala Lumpur	N/A	Bukit Bintang			Wisma Lembaga Getah Malaysia		
Kuala Lumpur	N/A	Bukit Bintang			Kuala Lumpur City Centre (KLCC)	Kuala Lumpur City Centre (KLCC) – Petronas Twin Towers, Suria KLCC	
Kuala Lumpur	N/A	Bukit Bintang			Kelana Jaya Line 5	KJ10 KLCC LRT station, Avenue K	
Kuala Lumpur	N/A	Bukit Bintang			Persiaran Hampshire	Persiaran Hampshire (Hampshire Drive)	
Kuala Lumpur	N/A	Bukit Bintang			Wisma MCA	Wisma MCA – Malaysian Chinese Association, (South Korea) Embassy of the Republic of Korea	
Kuala Lumpur	N/A	Bukit Bintang			Corus Hotel		
Kuala Lumpur	N/A	Bukit Bintang			Hotel Nikko; Lion Tower		
Kuala Lumpur	N/A	Bukit Bintang			Jalan Binjai	Jalan Binjai – Persiaran Stonor, Jalan Kia Peng	
Kuala Lumpur	N/A	Bukit Bintang			Ampang Park		
Kuala Lumpur	N/A	Bukit Bintang			Ampang Park station 5 12	KJ9 Ampang Park LRT station/ PY20 Ampang Park MRT station	
Kuala Lumpur	N/A	Bukit Bintang			Kuala Lumpur; Jalan Tun Razak	Kuala Lumpur Middle Ring Road 1 Jalan Tun Razak (Jalan Pekeliling) – Sentul, Segambut, Setapak, Kuantan, Ipoh, Sungai Besi, Petaling Jaya, Shah Alam, Putrajaya, Kuala Lumpur International Airport (KLIA), Seremban, Malacca, Johor Bahru	Junctions
Kuala Lumpur	N/A	Bukit Bintang			City Square	City Square – Vista Tower (formerly Empire Tower), City Square, The Intermark (formerly Yow Chuan Plaza)	
Kuala Lumpur	N/A	Bukit Bintang			(United Kingdom) Great Britain High Commission		
Kuala Lumpur	N/A	Bukit Bintang			(France) French Embassy		
Kuala Lumpur	N/A	Bukit Bintang			(Thailand) Royal Thai Embassy		
Kuala Lumpur	N/A	Bukit Bintang			(Saudi Arabia) Royal Saudi Arabian Embassy		
Kuala Lumpur	N/A	Bukit Bintang			Embassy of the People's Republic of China		
Kuala Lumpur	N/A	Bukit Bintang			Victoria Station restaurant		
Kuala Lumpur	N/A	Bukit Bintang			Persiaran Ampang Hilir	Persiaran Ampang Hilir – Jalan Ampang Hilir, Taman U-Thant	T-junctions
Kuala Lumpur	N/A	Bukit Bintang			Wisma Chinese Chamber	Wisma Chinese Chamber – Embassy of the Islamic State of Afghanistan, Embassy of Finland, (Netherlands) Royal Dutch Embassy	
Kuala Lumpur	N/A	Bukit Bintang			Sayfol International School		
Kuala Lumpur	N/A	Bukit Bintang			Malaysian Rubber Board Building	Malaysian Rubber Board Building (Bangunan Lembaga Getah Malaysia)	
Kuala Lumpur	N/A	Bukit Bintang			(Russia) Embassy of the Russian Federation		
Kuala Lumpur	N/A	Bukit Bintang			Jalan Ampang Tengah	Jalan Ampang Tengah	T-junctions
Kuala Lumpur	N/A	Bukit Bintang			Wisma PERKESO		
Kuala Lumpur	N/A	Bukit Bintang			M Suites, 283 Jalan Ampang		
Kuala Lumpur	N/A	Bukit Bintang			Jalan Jelatek	Jalan Jelatek – Kampung Datuk Keramat, Setiawangsa, Wangsa Maju, Setapak	T-junctions
Kuala Lumpur	N/A	Bukit Bintang			Great Eastern Tower	Great Eastern Tower – Great Eastern Mall	
Kuala Lumpur	N/A	Bukit Bintang			Gleneagles Intan Medical Centre	Gleneagles Intan Medical Centre	
Kuala Lumpur	N/A	Bukit Bintang			Jalan Ritche	Jalan Ritche – Jalan Ampang Hilir, Taman Tasik Ampang Hilir	T-junctions
Kuala Lumpur	N/A	Bukit Bintang			Ampang Hilir	Jalan Ru – Taman Tasik Ampang Hilir, Desa Pahlawan	From Ampang only
Kuala Lumpur	N/A	Bukit Bintang			Kampung Berembang	Jalan Berembang – Kampung Berembang, Kampung Berembang SMART Tunnel Holding Basin	
Kuala Lumpur	N/A	Bukit Bintang			Jalan Ampang Kiri	Jalan Ampang Kiri – RISDA, M City	From Kuala Lumpur only
Kuala Lumpur	N/A	Bukit Bintang			Ampang (Pekan Batu Ampat Ampang); Ampang-MRR2	FT 28 Kuala Lumpur Middle Ring Road 2 – Ulu Klang, Gombak, Setapak, Ipoh, Genting Highlands, Kuantan, Rawang, Cheras, Kajang, Semenyih, Shah Alam, Klang, Kuala Lumpur International Airport (KLIA), Seremban	Multi-level stacked SPUI interchange
Selangor	Hulu Langat	Ampang Jaya			Ampang	Jalan Memanda 1 – Town centre, Ampang Putri Specialist Hospital, Ampang Point; Jalan 1 – Little Korea	Junctions
Selangor	Hulu Langat	Ampang Jaya			Ampang-AKLEH	Ampang–Kuala Lumpur Elevated Highway – Kuala Lumpur, KLCC	From/to Ampang only
Selangor	Hulu Langat	Ampang Jaya			Taman Dato' Ahmad Razali		
Selangor	Hulu Langat	Ampang Jaya			Taman Dagang	Jalan Dagang Besar – Taman Dagang, Taman Nirwana, Taman Putra Sulaiman, Pandan Jaya	T-junctions
Selangor	Hulu Langat	Ampang Jaya			Kampung Melayu Ampang	Jalan Merbau – Kampung Melayu Ampang, Kampung Melayu Tambahan, Taman Perwira Dua, Ampang Jaya	T-junctions
Selangor	Hulu Langat	Ampang Jaya			Ampang Line 3	AG18 Ampang LRT station P&R	
Selangor	Hulu Langat	Ampang Jaya			Ampang; Pekan Ampang	Jalan Besar Ampang – Pekan Ampang	Y-junctions
Selangor	Hulu Langat	Ampang Jaya			Bandar Baru Ampang	Jalan Kosas 2 – Taman Kosas; Jalan Wawasan 4/2 – Bandar Baru Ampang,Spectrum Mall	Junctions
Selangor	Hulu Langat	Ampang Jaya			Ampang-SUKE	Sungai Besi–Ulu Klang Elevated Expressway – Kuala Lumpur, Ulu Klang	From Lembah Jaya only
Selangor	Hulu Langat	Ampang Jaya			Taman Kosas	Jalan Kosas Utama – Taman Kosas, Taman Bukit Indah, Taman Ampang Indah; Jalan Wawasan Ampang – Bandar Baru Ampang, Kampung Ampang Campuran, Pandan Indah	Junctions
Selangor	Hulu Langat	Ampang Jaya			Taman Sri Ampang	Jalan Desa Ampang – Taman Sri Ampang, Taman Sri Watan	T-junctions
Selangor	Hulu Langat	Ampang Jaya			Jalan Taman Putra	Jalan Taman Putra – Taman Dagang Permai, Taman Tasik Tambahan, Taman Muda, Hulu Langat, Pandan Indah, Cheras; Sungai Besi–Ulu Klang Elevated Expressway – Cheras, Kajang	T-junctions
Selangor	Hulu Langat	Ampang Jaya			Lembah Jaya	Jalan Lembah Jaya – Taman Lembah Jaya; East Klang Valley Expressway – Hulu Langat, Kajang, Semenyih, Seremban	T-junctions
1.000 mi = 1.609 km; 1.000 km = 0.621 mi: Incomplete access

== See also ==
- Ampang–Kuala Lumpur Elevated Highway
