= Thomas A. S. Tiang =

Thomas Tiang Ah Song is an architect based in Malaysia. In the 1970s, he was responsible for a few of Malaysia's earliest shopping centers, including one of the first South East Asian shopping centres, the modernist Ampang Park Shopping Centre. Ampang Park opened in March 1973; standing as the first and oldest shopping centre in Malaysia. The complex was developed by the Low Keng Huat Brothers Realty Sdn Bhd who were also the developers of the first shopping complex in Singapore; People's Park. The complex was 3 storeys tall, and because of cross-ventilation, its central atrium was, and remains, mostly un air-conditioned. It featured lifts, escalators, a carpark, and had 260,000 SF of commercial space. In addition to Tiang, the project architect, as listed in an advertisement, was the Design Partnership. Despite the shopping centre being over 40 years old, it still functions as a successful shopping hub.

Tiang was also the architect involved with another Kuala Lumpur shopping center, the Pertama Complex. At that time, he was employed by the architecture firm of S.P. Chew and Rakan-Rakan. Tiang is the principal architect of Arkitekk AAP. His early work in bringing shopping malls to South East Asia continued with his diverse involvements in projects ranging from hotels to a theme park.
