= Taman U-Thant =

Neighbourhood in Kuala Lumpur

Coordinates: 3.1538553°N 101.7183833°E

Taman U-Thant is a place in Kuala Lumpur, Malaysia. Located in the eastern part of the city, it was established in the 1960s and is home to mid-rise condominiums, foreign embassies including Embassy of the Republic of France, Royal Thai Embassy and the Embassy of Switzerland; and several international schools.

It was named after the former UN Secretary-General from 1961 until 1971, U Thant. Being one of two areas of Jalan Ampang, it is also known as the Embassy Row.

A store, Hock Choon Supermarket, previously a family-owned supermarket, is located here.

== History ==
The Kuala Lumpur Structure Plan 2020 has designated the area along with several others around the city to be a low-density area and free from "high-rise developments", with buildings being less limited to 10 storeys.

== See also ==
- List of Kuala Lumpur embassies
