= Ampang Park LRT station =

LRT station in Kuala Lumpur, Malaysia

Coordinates: 3°09′35″N 101°43′07″E

KJ9 Ampang Park
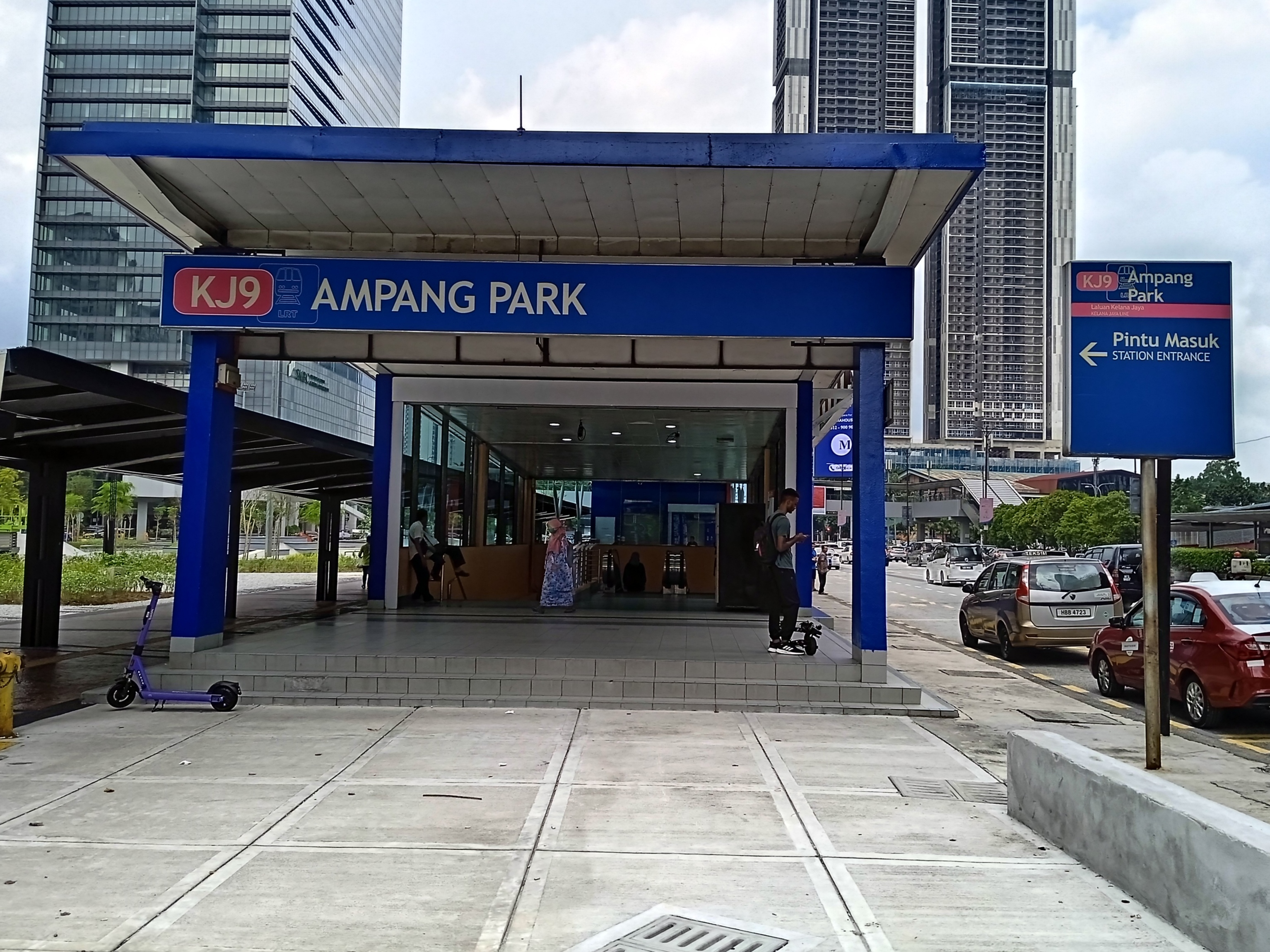
- Ampang Park station entrance (on the Ampang-bound side of Jalan Ampang)

General information
- Other names: Malay: امڤڠ ڤارك (Jawi); Chinese: 安邦坊; Tamil: அம்பாங் பார்க்
- Location: Jalan Ampang; 50450 Kuala Lumpur; Malaysia
- System: Rapid KL
- Owner: Prasarana Malaysia
- Operator: Rapid Rail
- Line: 5 Kelana Jaya Line
- Platforms: 1 island platform
- Tracks: 2
- Connections: Connecting station to PY20 Ampang Park

Construction
- Structure type: Underground
- Parking: Not available
- Cycle facilities: Not available
- Accessible: Available

Other information
- Status: Operational
- Station code: KJ9

History
- Opened: 1 June 1999; 27 years ago

Services
Preceding station		Following station
Damai towards Gombak	Kelana Jaya Line	KLCC towards Putra Heights
Location

Ampang Park LRT station is a light rapid transit (LRT) station in Kuala Lumpur that is served by Rapid KL's LRT Kelana Jaya Line. The LRT station is the last underground station on the Kelana Jaya Line along Jalan Ampang, near the Jalan Tun Razak intersection, before the line heads above ground again at Damai.

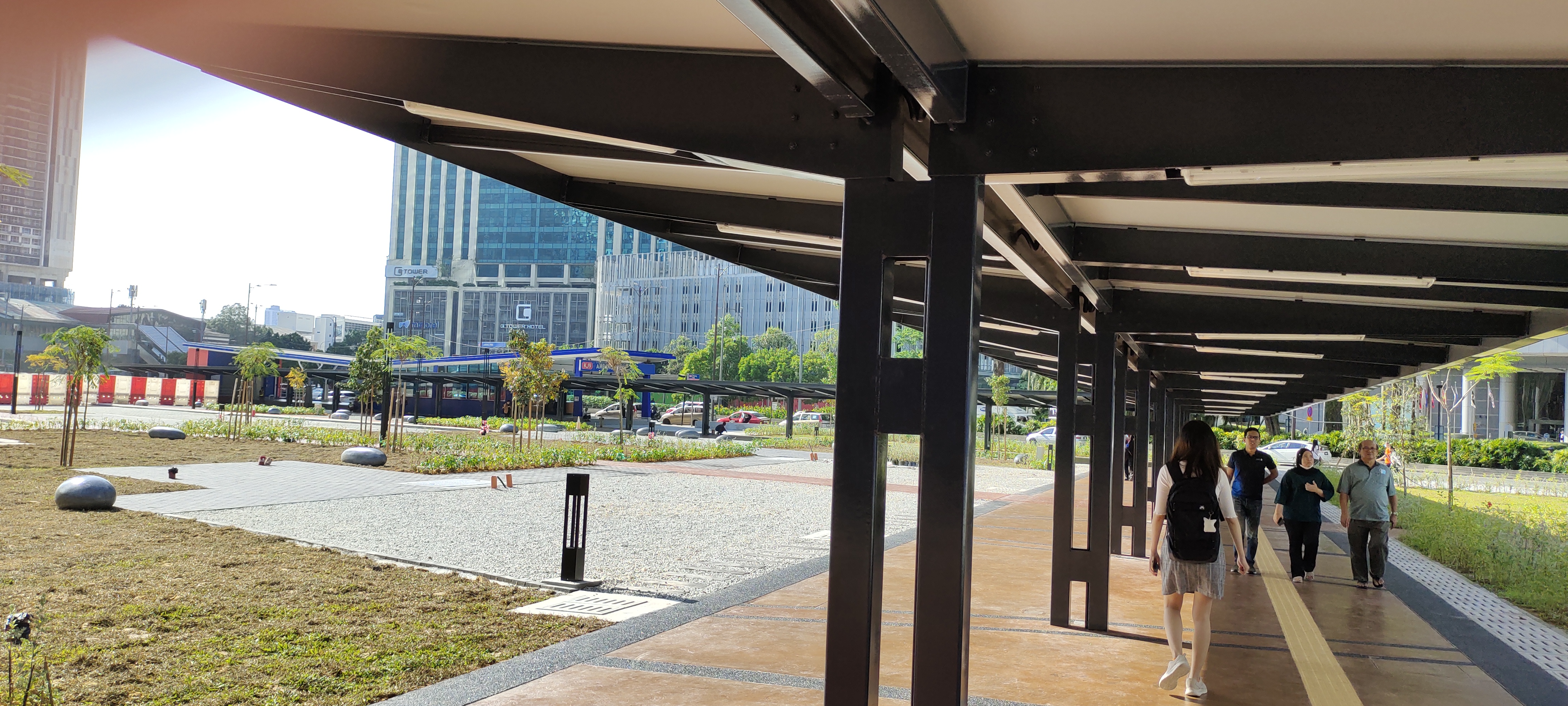
Pedestrian walkway from the MRT station to the LRT station

The LRT station is close to Citibank's Malaysian headquarters, as well as the United States Embassy, the Singapore High Commission, the Canadian High Commission, and the British High Commission which are all located in the area of Jalan Tun Razak known as "Embassy Row". It is named after and located beside the former site of the first Malaysian shopping centre, Ampang Park. The shopping centre has since been demolished to make way for the Ampang Park MRT station on the MRT Putrajaya Line; the former site of the shopping centre has been turned into a public park and a roller-skating park.

The LRT station, despite sharing the same name, is not integrated with the separate MRT station. Paid-area integration was once proposed but not constructed at the moment due to cost-cutting measures. Passengers are required to tap out from one station, exit the station at the ground level and walk along a covered walkway to the entrance of the other station to transfer between the two lines. Thus, the stations are designated as connecting stations on official transit maps.

== History ==
This station was opened on 1 June 1999, as Phase Two of the then PUTRA LRT system, which ran from Masjid Jamek to Terminal PUTRA (has since been renamed to Gombak). The exterior building design of the LRT station was done by NEUformation. The station shape, created as a series of inclined glass planar surfaces, implies motion in keeping with the concept of the LRT system as a future mode of transit.

== Layout ==
The station consists of three levels, with the entrance on the ground level while the ticketing area, concourse and platforms are underground. Similar to all Kelana Jaya Line underground stations, the Ampang Park station features an island platform sandwiched between two railway tracks for each direction.

Paid-to-paid interchange between the Kelana Jaya Line and the Putrajaya Line, both underground, was planned for the Ampang Park stations; the integration was scrapped in favour of an out-of-station interchange due to cost-cutting measures. The proposed integration would have been the first underground station transfer between two separate lines and stations in the rapid transit system of Kuala Lumpur. Passengers will have to tap out from one line, resurface to the ground level, and enter the other underground station when changing between the two lines with a 7-minute walking time between platforms.

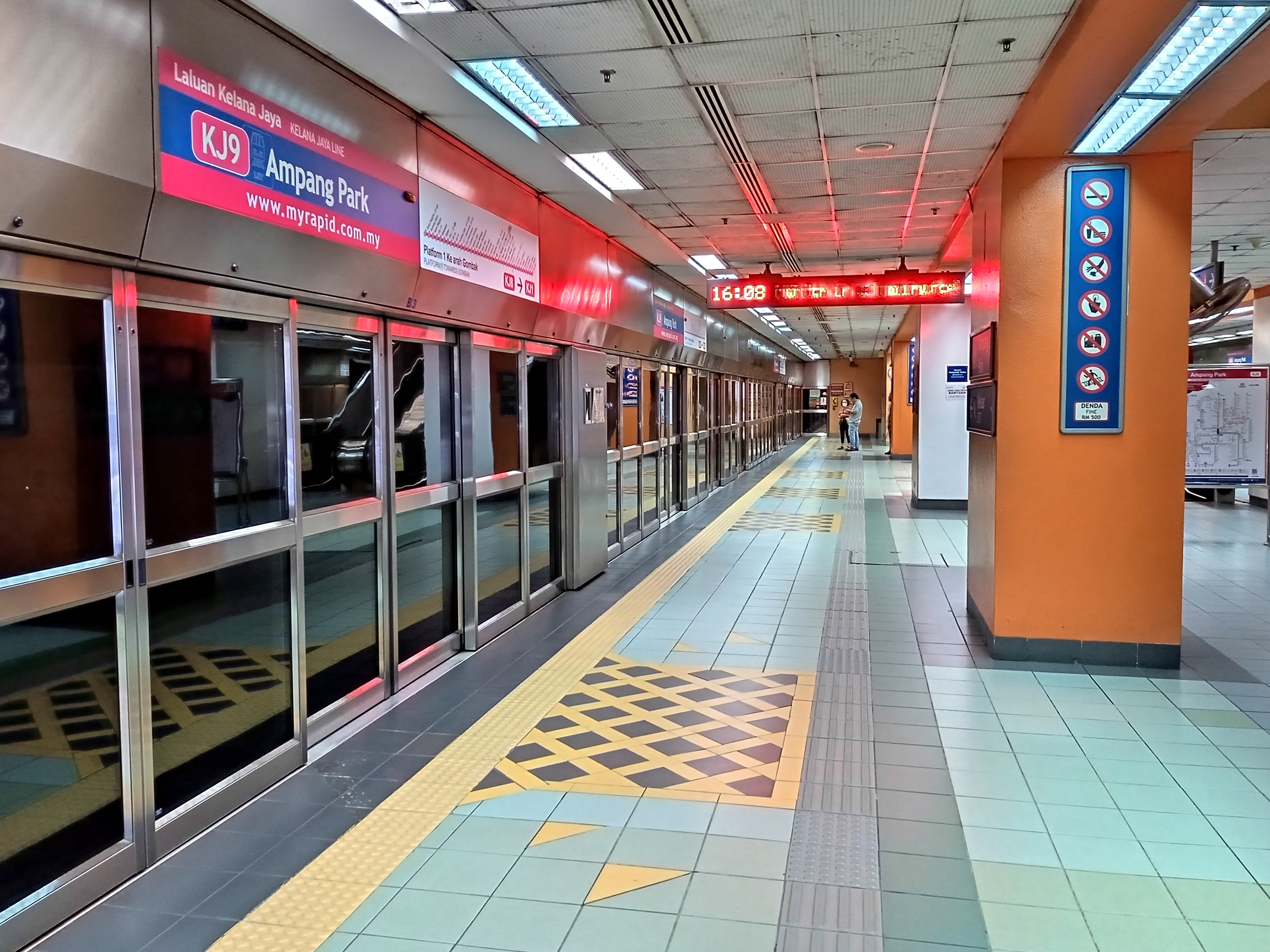
LRT station platforms

G	Street Level	Jalan Ampang, Bus Hub, Citibank, Intercontinental Hotel, Walkway to Ampang Park MRT station
C	Concourse	Faregates, Ticketing Machines, Station Control, Shops
P	Platform 1:	5 Kelana Jaya Line towards KJ1 Gombak (→)
P	Island platform, Doors will open on the right
P	Platform 2:	5 Kelana Jaya Line towards KJ37 Putra Heights (←)

Proposed future direct access to LRT station at Level B1 of the Ampang Park MRT station

=== Exits and Entrances ===
Kelana Jaya Line station
Entrance	Destination	Picture
North	Street level access. North side of Jalan Ampang; Ampang Park MRT station (Entrance B)	
South	Street level access. South side of Jalan Ampang; Access to Jalan Tun Razak Pedestrian Walkway to Intermark Mall, The LINC	

== See also ==
- Rail transport in Malaysia
