= The Intermark =

Skyscraper in Kuala Lumpur, Malaysia

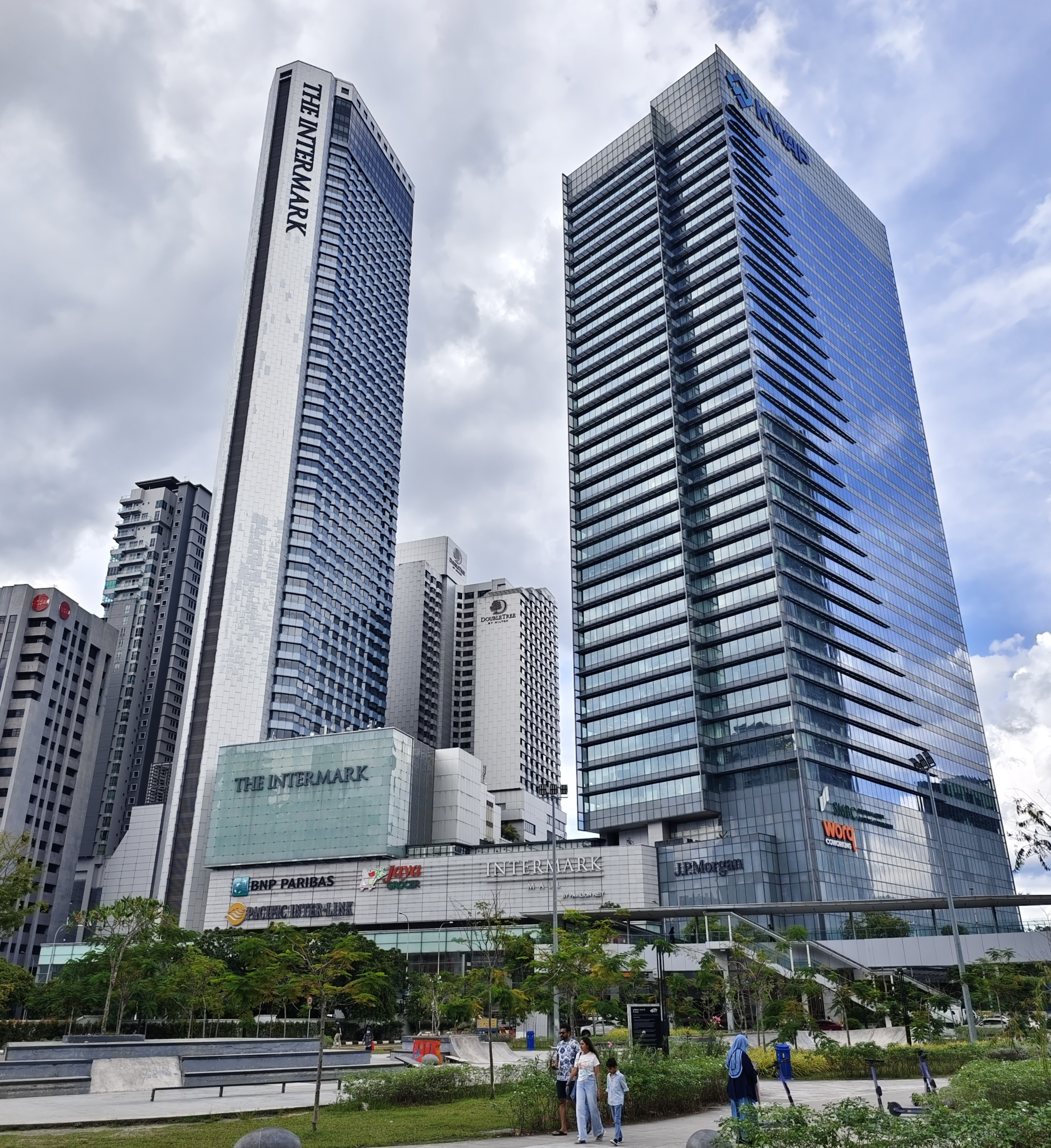
- The Intermark in December 2025
- Former names: Empire Tower; Vista Tower

General information
- Type: Commercial offices
- Location: 182 Jalan Tun Razak; Kuala Lumpur, Malaysia
- Coordinates: 3.16194°N 101.72°E
- Construction started: 1991
- Completed: 1994

Height
- Roof: 238.1 m (781 ft)

Technical details
- Floor count: 63
- Floor area: 11,000 sq ft (1,000 m^{2})

Design and construction
- Architects: Aedas; GDP Arkitect
- Services engineer: SM Consulting Engineers Sdn Bhd

The Intermark (formerly Vista Tower and Empire Tower) is part of an integrated development. Located on Jalan Tun Razak in Kuala Lumpur city centre, The Intermark comprises two office towers - Integra Tower, and a "landmark" office building – Vista Tower, a hotel building by DoubleTree by Hilton, and a 200,000-square-foot (19,000 m^{2}) retail podium.

Phase 1 of the development includes the Vista Tower, retail podium and a Doubletree by Hilton Hotel, the first in Southeast Asia.

It was proposed to be acquired by AmanahRaya Reit in September 2017 for MYR 455 million.

== See also ==
- List of tallest buildings in Kuala Lumpur
