= Maluri station =

Metro station in Kuala Lumpur, Malaysia

AG13 Maluri; KG22 Maluri – AEON
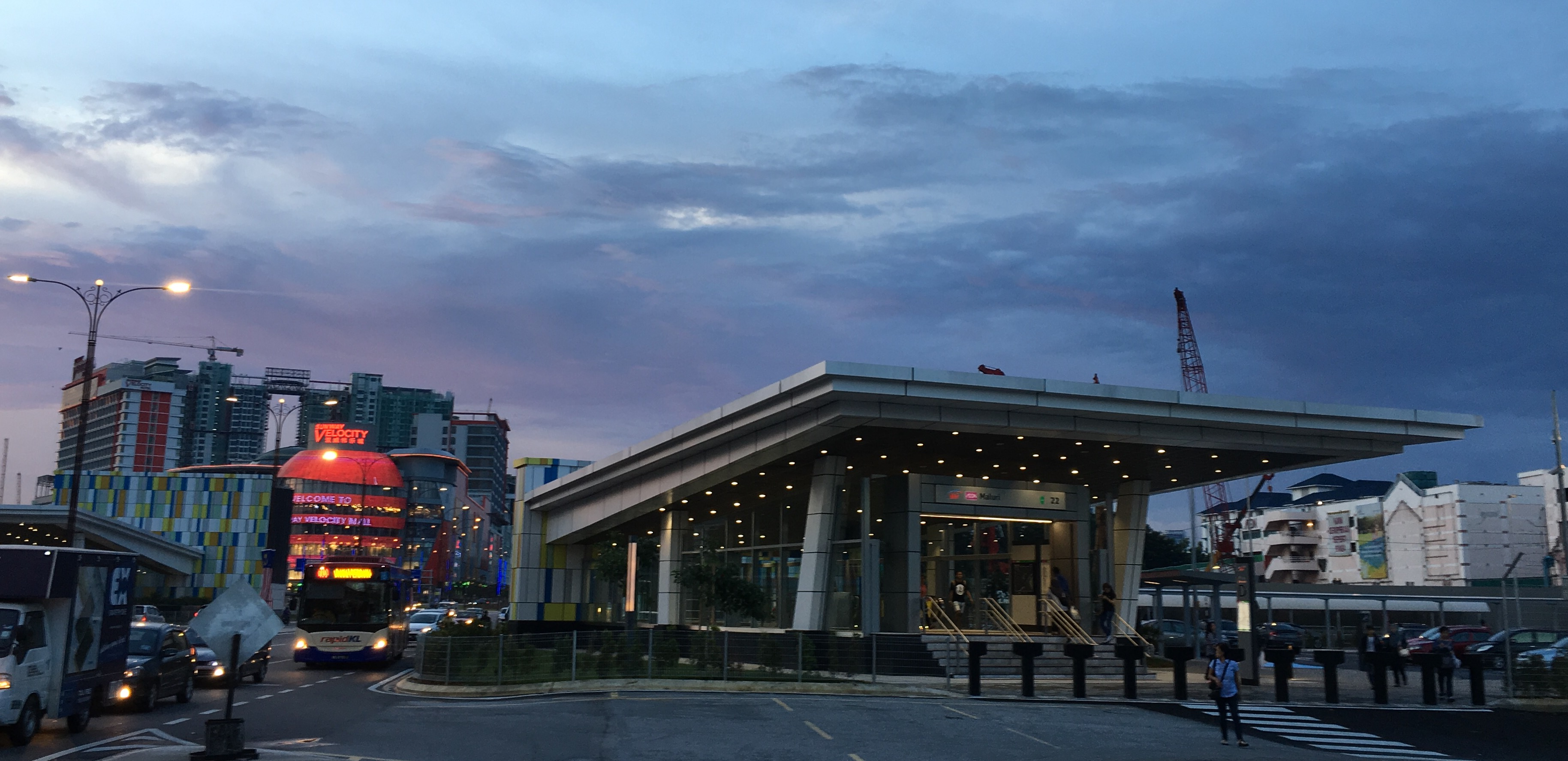
- Entrance to Maluri MRT station

General information
- Other names: Malay: مالوري (Jawi); Chinese: 马鲁里; Tamil: மலூரி
- Location: Jalan Cheras, Taman Maluri, Cheras; 56000 Kuala Lumpur; Malaysia
- Coordinates: 3°7′23.74″N 101°43′37.06″E
- System: Rapid KL
- Owner: Prasarana Malaysia (LRT); MRT Corp (MRT)
- Operator: Rapid Rail
- Lines: 3 Ampang Line; 9 Kajang Line
- Platforms: 2 side platforms (LRT); 1 island platform (MRT)
- Tracks: 2 (LRT); 2 (MRT)

Construction
- Structure type: AG13 Elevated; KG22 Underground
- Depth: 21 metres (69 ft)
- Platform levels: 2
- Parking: Available with payment. 250 total parking bays and 50 motorcycle bays.
- Cycle facilities: Not available
- Accessible: Yes

Other information
- Status: Operational
- Station code: AG13 KG22

History
- Opened: 16 December 1996; 29 years ago (LRT); 17 July 2017; 9 years ago (MRT)

Services
Preceding station		Following station
Miharja towards Sentul Timur	Ampang Line	Pandan Jaya towards Ampang
Cochrane towards Kwasa Damansara	Kajang Line	Taman Pertama towards Kajang
Location

Maluri station is an integrated light rapid transit (LRT) and mass rapid transit (MRT) located on the eastern fringe of Cheras, Kuala Lumpur near and named after Taman Maluri, a residential housing estate. The station is located along Jalan Cheras (English: Cheras Road, also known as Jalan Cheras Lama or Old Cheras Road), near the Jalan Cheras Lama exit of the Sungai Besi Expressway, opposite the AEON Taman Maluri shopping centre and Sunway Velocity Mall. The Kerayong River also runs beside the station.

The station consists of an elevated station served by the LRT Ampang Line (formerly known as STAR LRT) which was opened in 1996, and the underground station served by the MRT Kajang Line which was opened on 17 July 2017. Both stations are connected via a paid-area-to-paid-area elevated pedestrian linkway.

Under the station naming rights programme, the MRT station is currently known as Maluri–AEON MRT station.

== Station Background ==
=== Colonial era ===
During British colonial era and until the 1980s, the site of the present-day Maluri station was a halt on the Keretapi Tanah Melayu (KTM) network called Pudoh Ulu or Pudu Ulu.

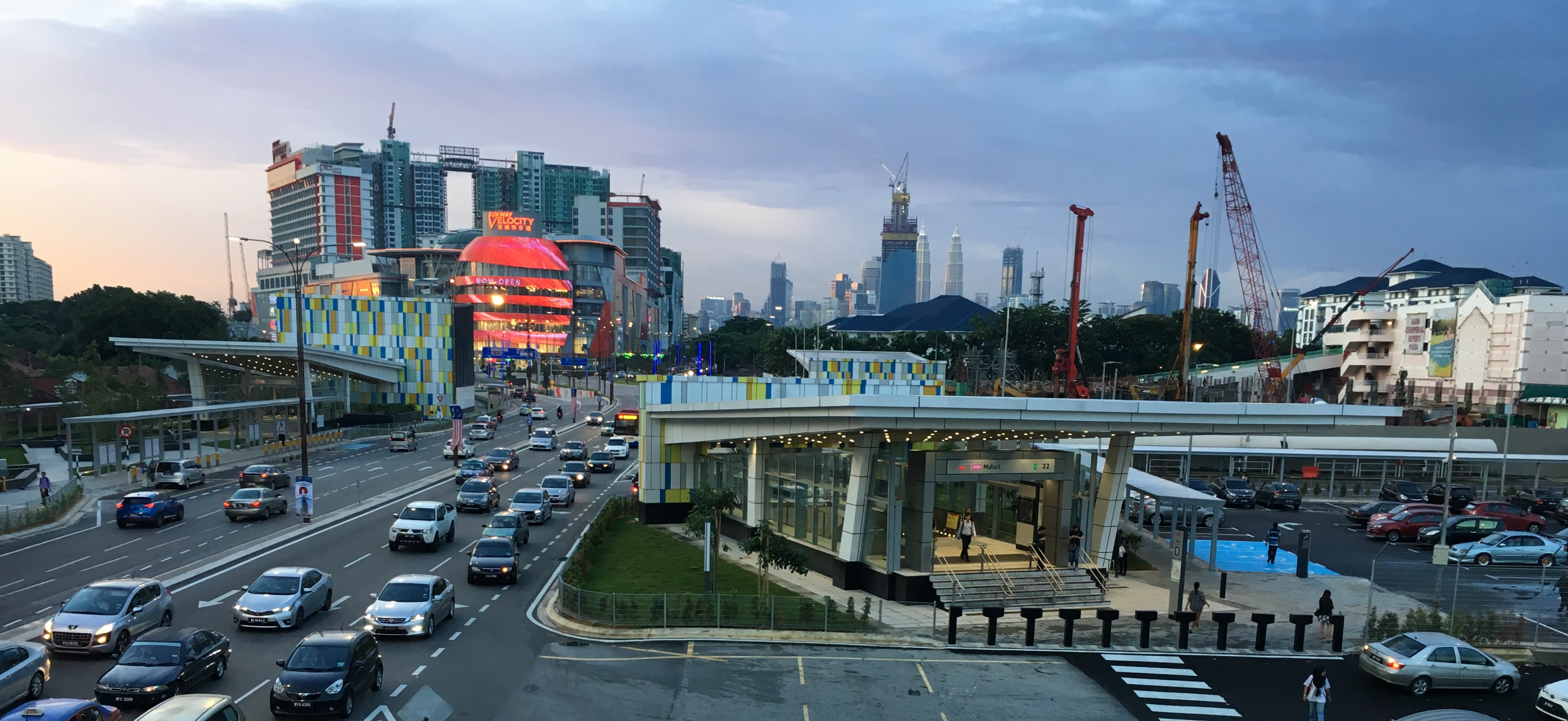
The MRT station's Entrance B (left) and Entrance D (right) on either side of Jalan Cheras.

=== LRT station ===
The older elevated station serves the LRT Ampang Line, which is built according to the standard design of the Ampang Line elevated stations.

It consists of two side platforms flanking the double elevated tracks, above a concourse level where the fare gates are located. Both platforms can be reached from the concourse level via stairways, escalators and elevators. The elevators were a recent addition to the station, and hence, the station was not disabled-friendly until they were installed in 2015.

=== MRT station ===
The MRT station is one of the seven underground stations of the MRT Kajang Line. The underground station is built directly beneath Jalan Cheras. The station has two underground levels - a concourse level with fare gates, a customer service office, toilets and machinery rooms - and an island platform below.

The theme given for the design of the station is "New Generation" and features colourful panels on the exterior and interior walls of the station.

The MRT station is the last underground station before the line resurfaces and heads towards Kajang.

=== LRT-MRT Linkway ===
The Maluri station comprises two separate station buildings which are connected via an elevated linkway. An elevated linkway connecting the paid areas of both the LRT and MRT stations allows commuters to transfer seamlessly between the LRT Ampang Line and the MRT Kajang Line at this station.

The linkway was built together with the MRT station. It connects the LRT station at the paid area of the concourse level, and connects directly to Entrance C of the MRT station at the ground level. From Entrance C, escalators, a lift and a staircase go directly down to the paid area of the underground concourse level.

As the linkway is part of the paid area of both stations, there are no direct exits to/from the outside. Unlike the MRT station, the linkway is not air-conditioned.

== History ==
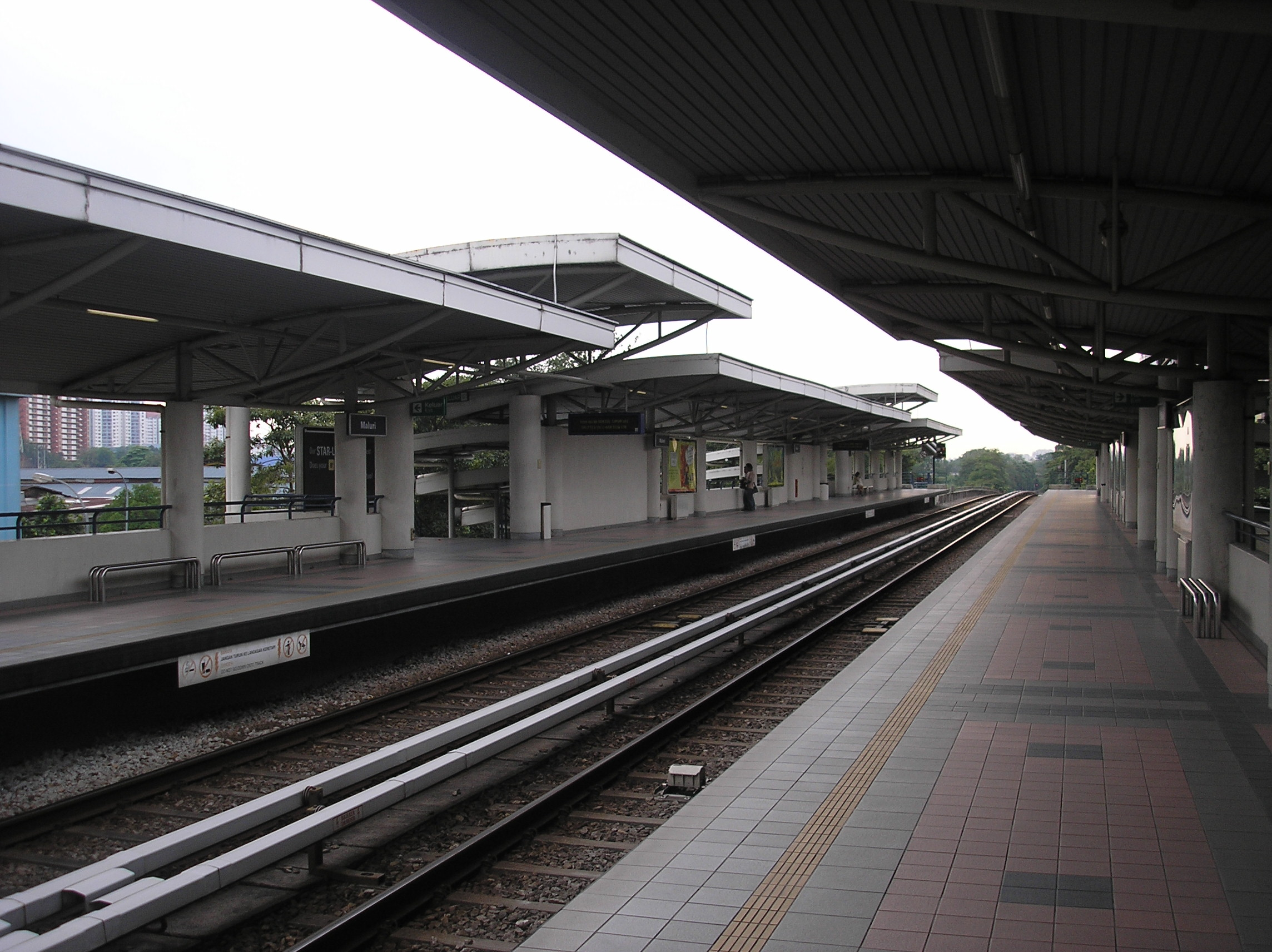
A platform view of the Maluri LRT station towards Miharja station

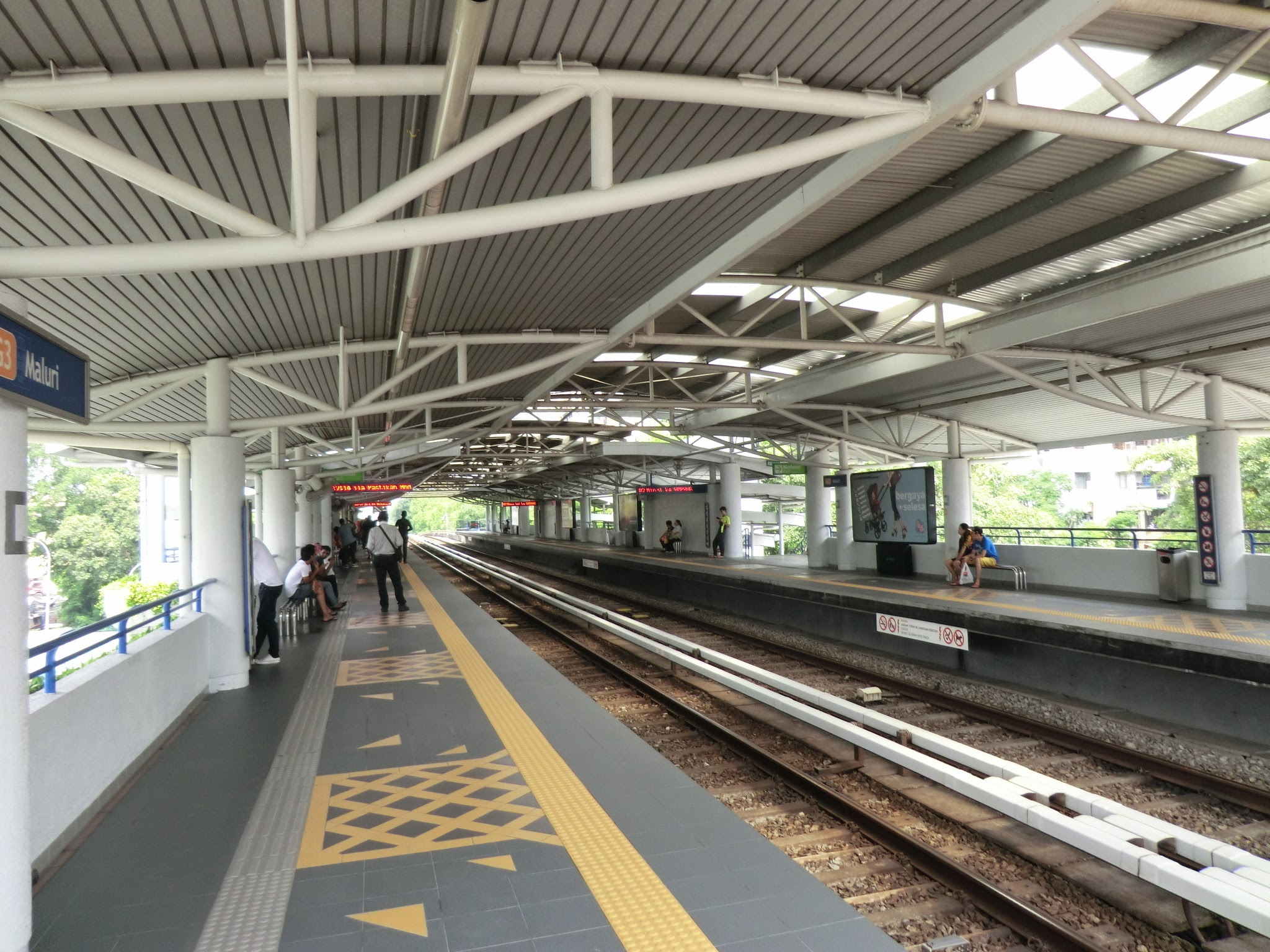
The LRT platforms

=== KTM Ampang branch line ===
The alignment of the LRT Ampang Line at this location uses the alignment of the old Federated Malay States Railways (FMSR) tracks which ran from Ampang Junction, where the Ampang branch line left the main West Coast Line (between today's Chan Sow Lin and Miharja stations) to head to the terminus of the branch line at Ampang town (where today's Ampang Line depot and Ampang station, the terminus of the LRT Ampang Line is located).

This branch line was opened on 1 May 1914 and was mostly to cater to the tin mines in the Ampang area. However, no railway station is known to have existed at this location during this period.

The tracks crossed Jalan Cheras as a level crossing until the alignment was converted to an elevated rail line for the construction of the LRT in the 1990s where a railway bridge was built over the road.

=== LRT Ampang Line ===
The LRT station was constructed as part of the development of the former STAR LRT project in the 1990s. It was completed and opened together with the line on 16 December 1996, along with 13 other stations between the Sultan Ismail and the Ampang.

The line was the first LRT line to be operational in Malaysia.

=== MRT Kajang Line ===
Construction of the underground MRT station began in 2012 following the official launch of the construction of the MRT Kajang Line. Since the station is located beneath Jalan Cheras, various diversions of the road had to be carried out throughout the construction of the station. Decking above the work site was also erected to enable traffic to run while station box excavation and other construction work proceeded underneath.

The station was opened on 17 July 2017 together with the opening of Phase Two of the MRT line from Muzium Negara to Kajang.

== Bus Services ==
=== MRT Feeder Bus Services ===
There are no MRT feeder bus services that start or end at this station. However, the station is served by other MRT feeder bus services from other stations.

Route No.	Origin	Destination	Via	Notes
T352 (As a pass-by)	Taman Shamelin Perkasa	KG21 Cochrane	Jalan Perdana Utama; Pandan Perdana; Jalan Indah; Taman Cheras Indah; Sungai Besi Expressway (Pandan Indah Link); AG14 Pandan Jaya; Menara PGRM; Jalan Cheras; AG13 KG22 Maluri (Entrance B); Jalan Shelley; Jalan Cochrane; Jalan Tun Razak; AG13 KG22 Maluri (Entrance D)	For KG21 Cochrane bound, the bus will stop at the bus stops near Entrance B / LRT Entrance. For Taman Shamelin Perkasa / Bandar Tun Razak / Bandar Sri Permaisuri bound, the bus will stop at the bus stop near Entrance D.
T400	KG21 Cochrane	Bandar Tun Razak	Jalan Tun Razak; Jalan Cheras; AG13 KG22 Maluri (Entrance D); Stadium Badminton Cheras; Jalan Yaacob Latif; Velodrom Kuala Lumpur; FT 1 Cheras Highway (Jalan Cheras); Hospital Canselor Tuanku Muhriz UKM (HCTM); Taman Midah; Bandar Tun Razak; Jalan Budiman; AG13 KG22 Maluri (Entrance B); Jalan Shelley	For KG21 Cochrane bound, the bus will stop at the bus stops near Entrance B / LRT Entrance. For Taman Shamelin Perkasa / Bandar Tun Razak / Bandar Sri Permaisuri bound, the bus will stop at the bus stop near Entrance D.
T401	KG21 Cochrane	Bandar Sri Permaisuri	Jalan Tun Razak; Jalan Cheras; AG13 KG22 Maluri (Entrance D); Stadium Badminton Cheras; Flat Sri Sabah; Jalan Ikan Emas; Jalan Sekilau; Flat Sri Melaka; Taman Sri Permaisuri; Bandar Sri Permaisuri; Jalan Jellawat 1 SP12 Cheras; AG13 KG22 Maluri (Entrance B); Jalan Shelley	For KG21 Cochrane bound, the bus will stop at the bus stops near Entrance B / LRT Entrance. For Taman Shamelin Perkasa / Bandar Tun Razak / Bandar Sri Permaisuri bound, the bus will stop at the bus stop near Entrance D.

=== Other Bus Services ===
The Maluri station also provides accessibility for some other bus services.

Route No.	Operator	Origin	Destination	Via	Notes
450	Rapid KL	Hentian Kajang	Hub Lebuh Pudu	Reko Sentral Bandar Kajang; KG34 Stadium Kajang; KG33 Sungai Jernih; Sungai Sekamat; Simpang Balak; KG31 Bukit Dukung; Cheras–Kajang Expressway; Jalan Hulu Langat; Batu 9 Cheras / Taman Suntex; Cheras Sentral / KG26 Taman Connaught; FT 1 Cheras Highway (Jalan Cheras); KG24 Taman Midah; AG13 KG22 Maluri; Jalan Cheras; Jalan Pasar; Jalan Pudu	For KL-bound, the bus will stop at the bus stop near the LRT Entrance. For Kajang / Damai Perdana bound, the bus will stop at the bus stop near Entrance D.
400	Rapid KL	Damai Perdana	Hub Lebuh Pudu	Taman Desa Baiduri; Alam Damai; Jalan Cheras; FT 1 Cheras Highway (Jalan Cheras); KG24 Taman Midah; AG13 KG22 Maluri; Jalan Pudu; Berjaya Times Square / MR5 Imbi; MR6 Bukit Bintang; KG18A Bukit Bintang; Jalan Raja Chulan; Jalan Tun H.S. Lee	For KL-bound, the bus will stop at the bus stop near the LRT Entrance. For Kajang / Damai Perdana bound, the bus will stop at the bus stop near Entrance D.
402	Rapid KL	AG13 KG22 Maluri (Entrance D)	Pekeliling Bus Hub AG3 SP3 MR11 PY13 CC09 Titiwangsa	Jalan Cheras; FT 1 Cheras Highway (Jalan Cheras) Stadium Badminton Cheras; Flat Sri Sabah; AG13 KG22 Maluri (LRT Entrance); Jalan Tun Razak; Masjid Jamek Alam Shah; Istana Terengganu; KJ9 Ampang Park; KLCC; National Heart Institute (IJN); Istana Budaya; Kuala Lumpur Hospital	The bus technically starts from Entrance D. However, passengers can take the bus from the LRT entrance as an alternative.

== Nearby ==
- AEON Taman Maluri Shopping Centre
- Sunway Velocity Mall
- Rapid Bus Maluri Depot
- Cheras District Police Headquarters (IPD Cheras)

== Gallery ==
=== LRT Station ===
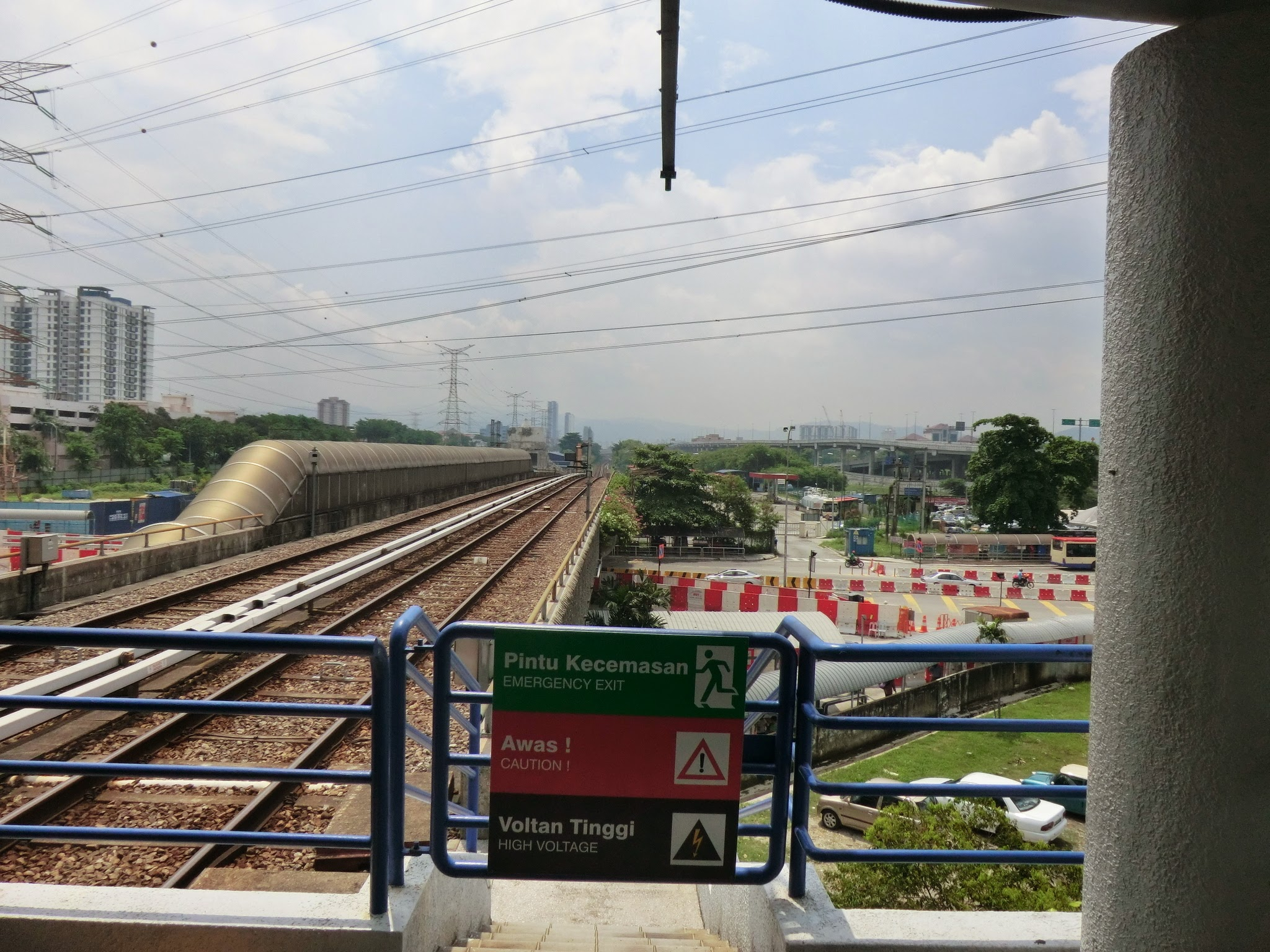
The tracks as seen from the station, heading towards Pandan Jaya LRT station

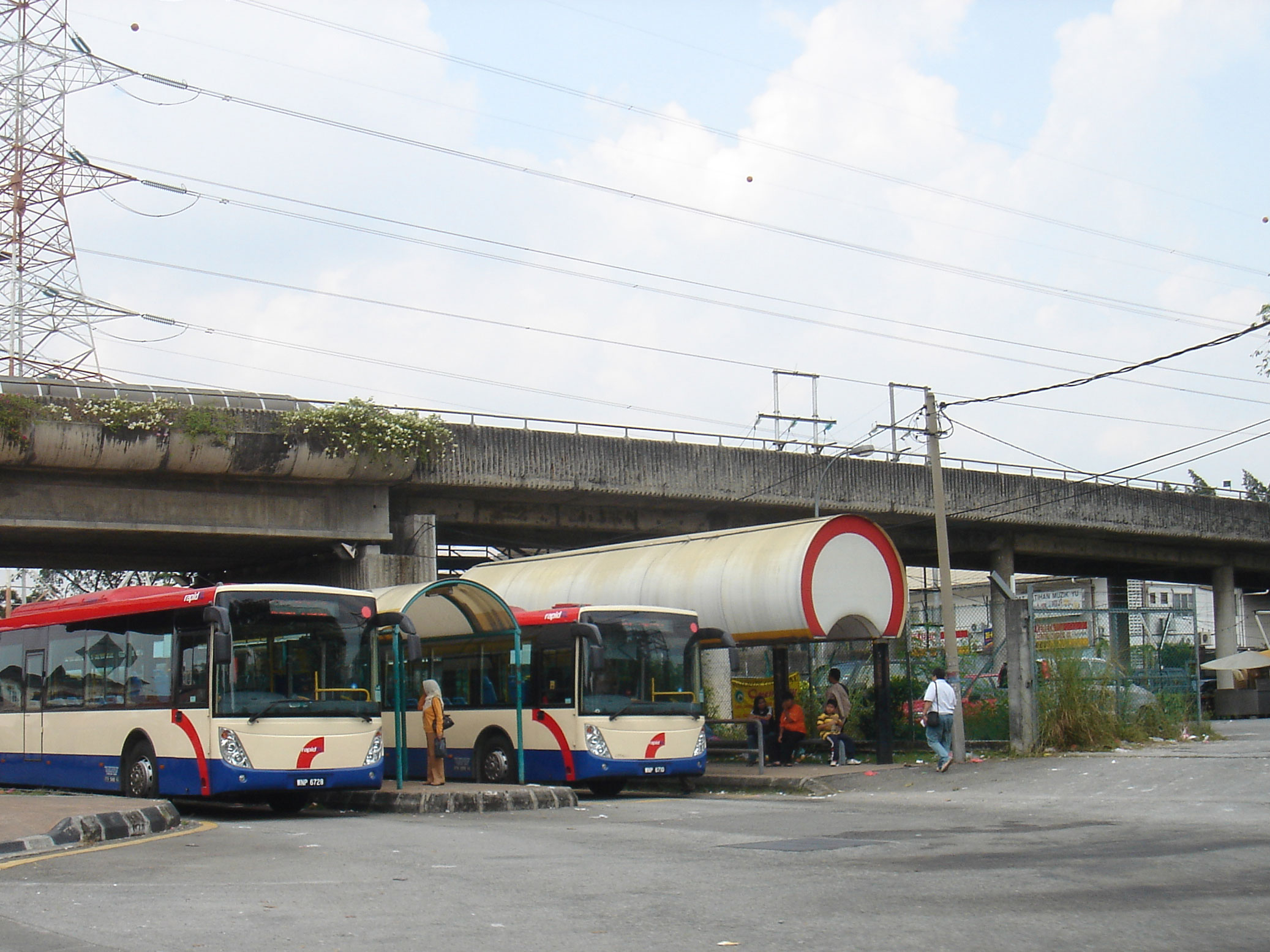
The bus hub at Maluri LRT, as taken in January 2006

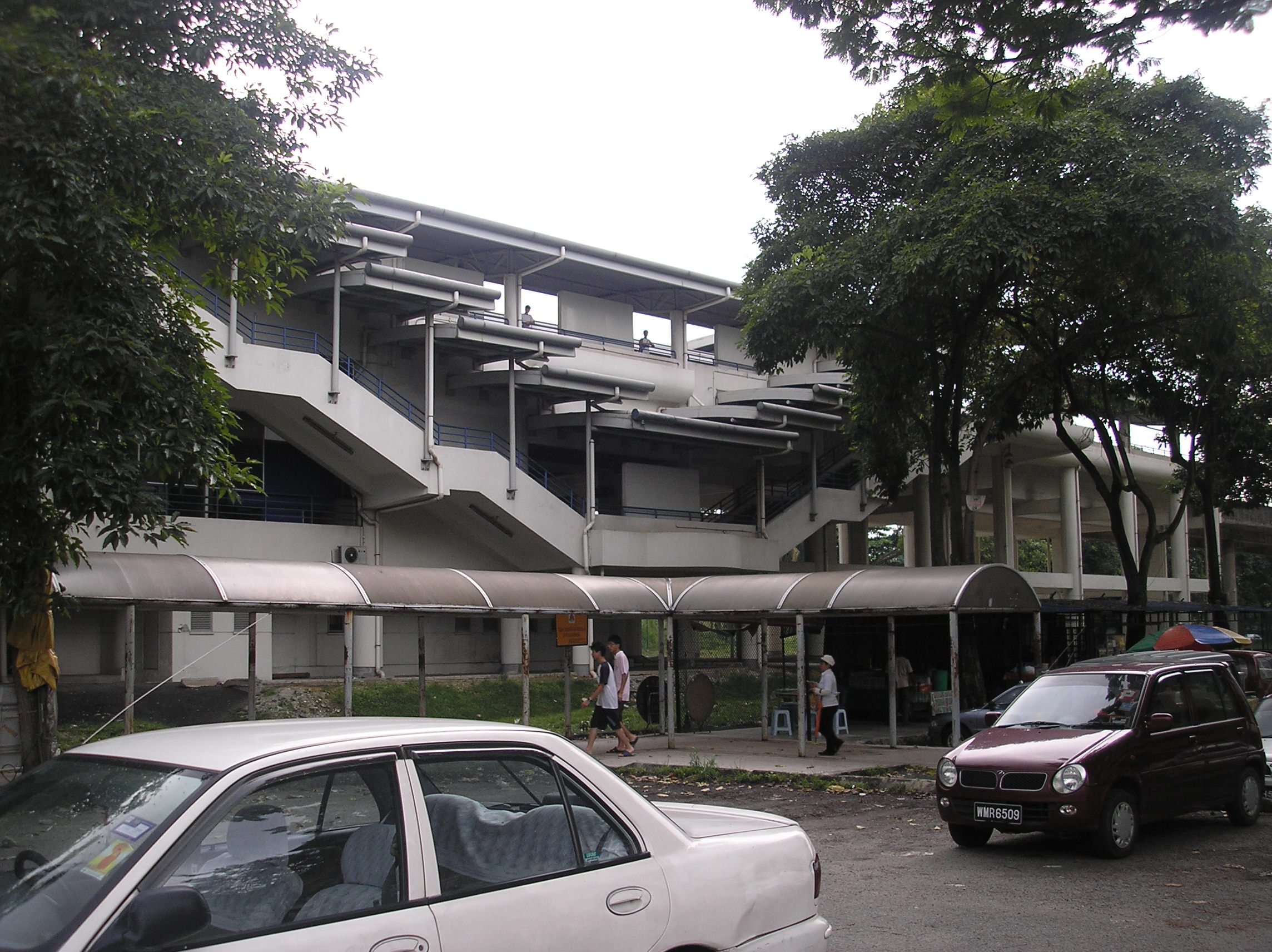
The Maluri LRT station from the exterior, as taken in 2007

=== MRT Station ===
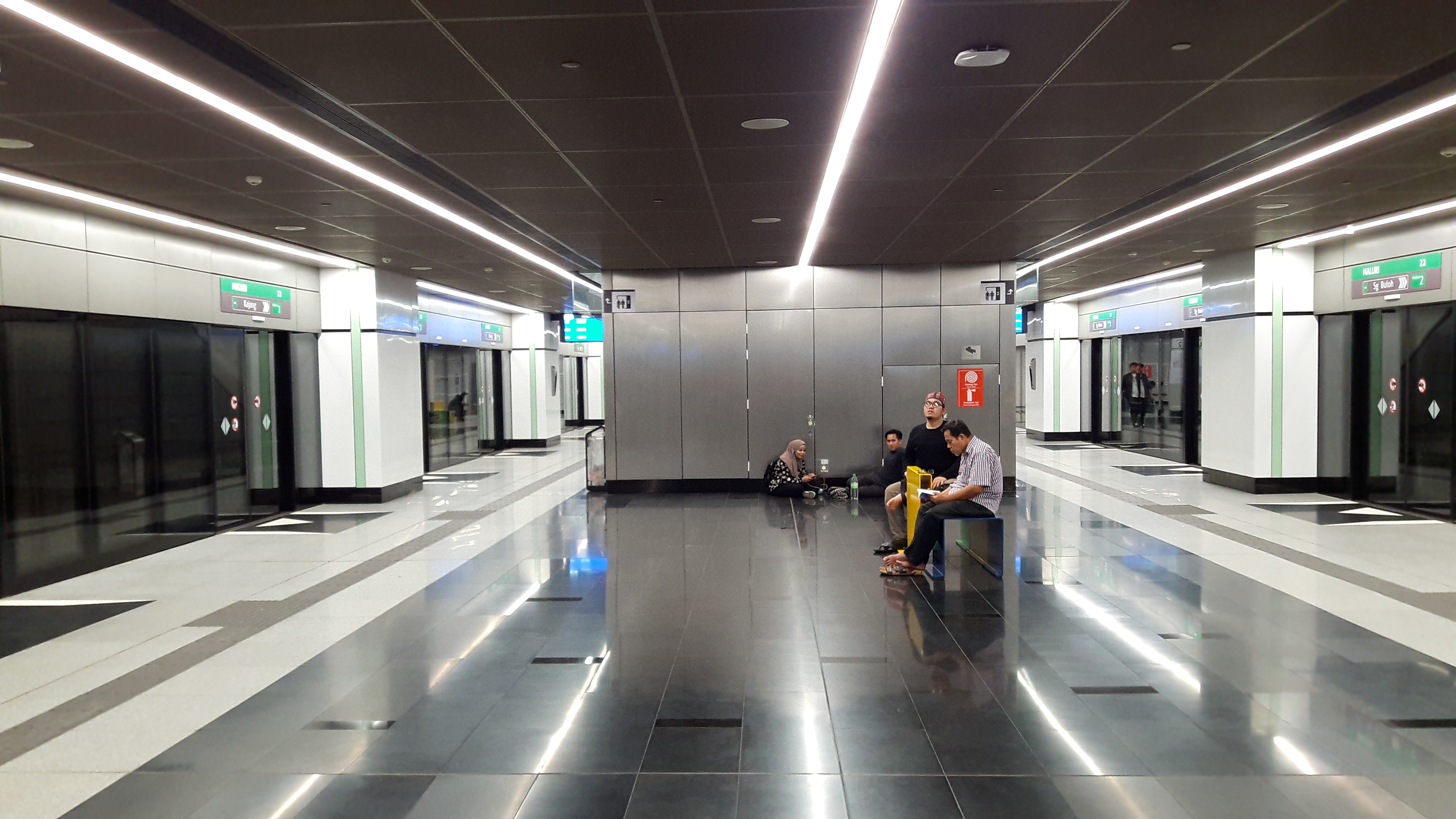
The platform level in the Maluri MRT station. The space is almost twice as wide as Masjid Jamek's platform level

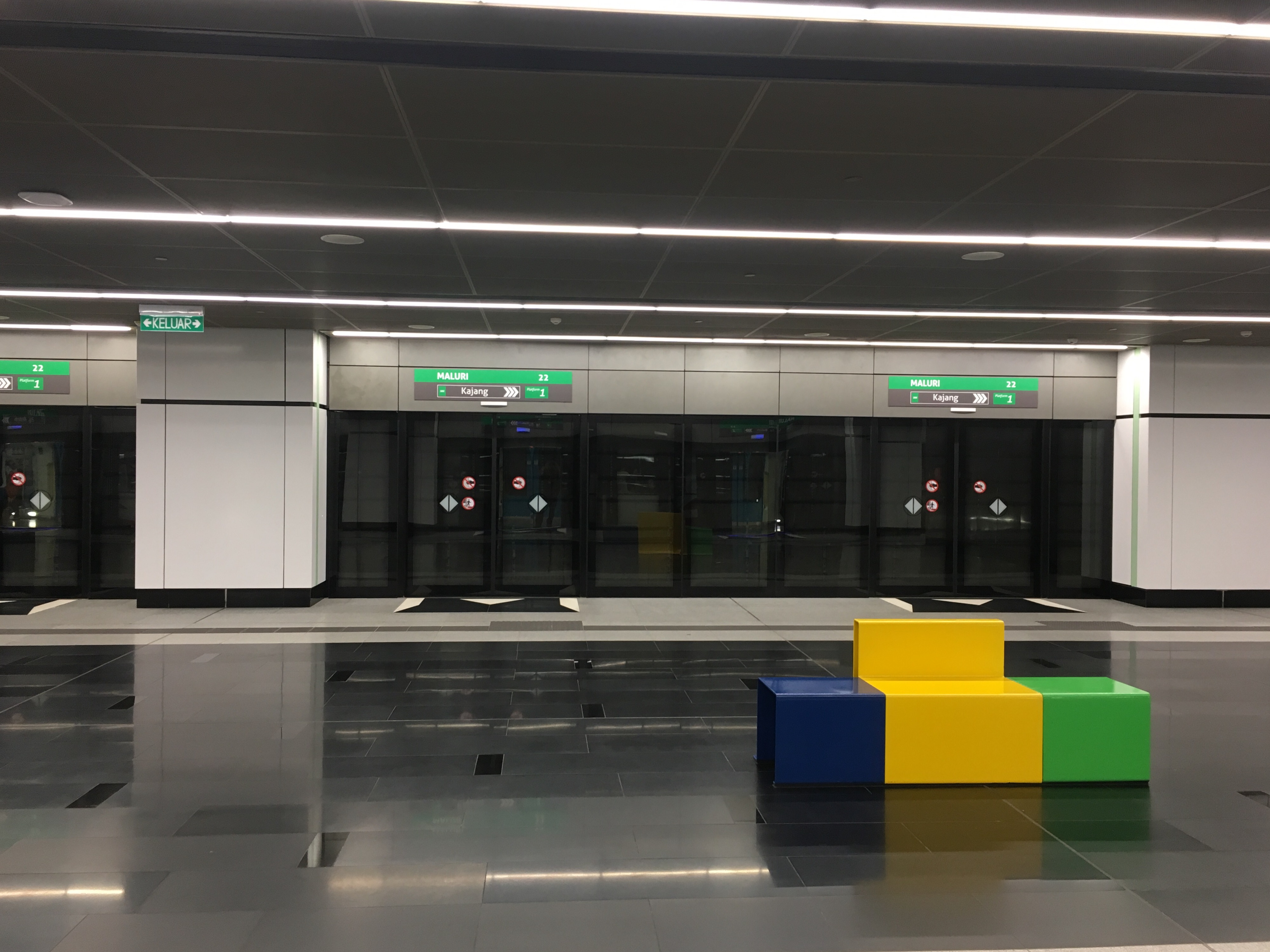
View of the platform level

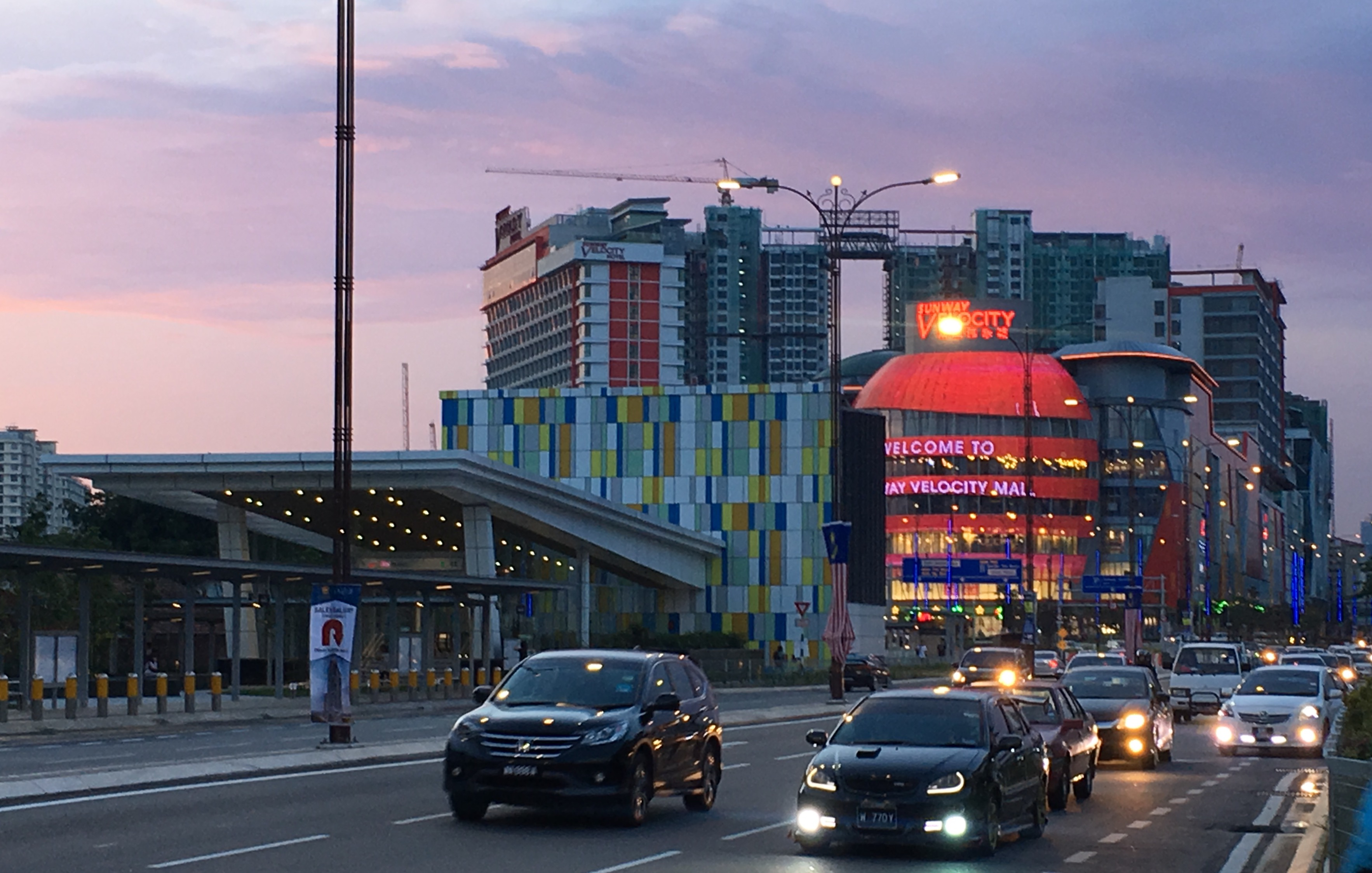
Entrance B with the Sunway Velocity Shopping Complex in the background

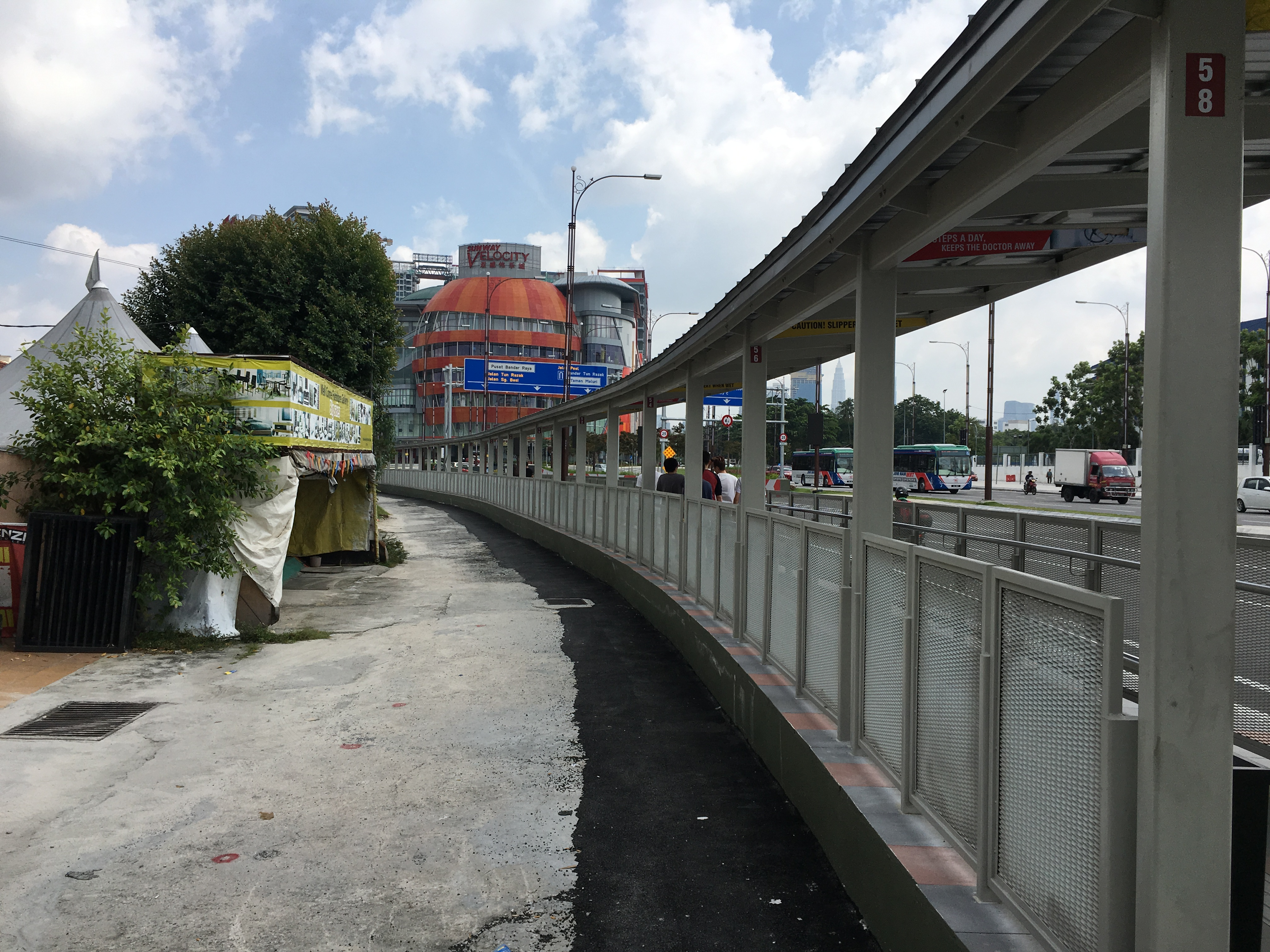
Covered walkway leading to the Sunway Velocity Shopping Complex from Entrance B

=== LRT-MRT Linkway ===
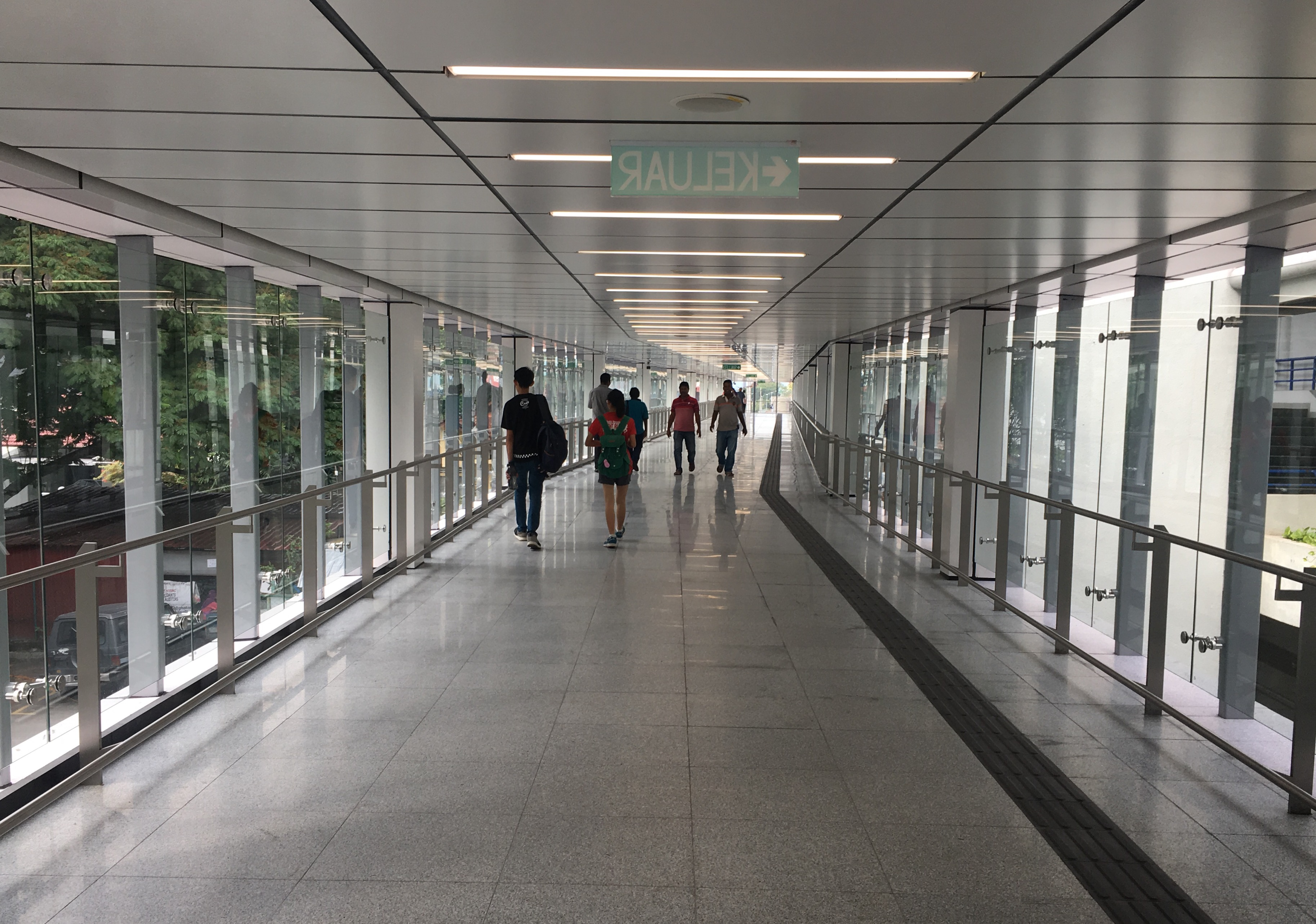
View of the LRT to MRT linkway at Maluri Station

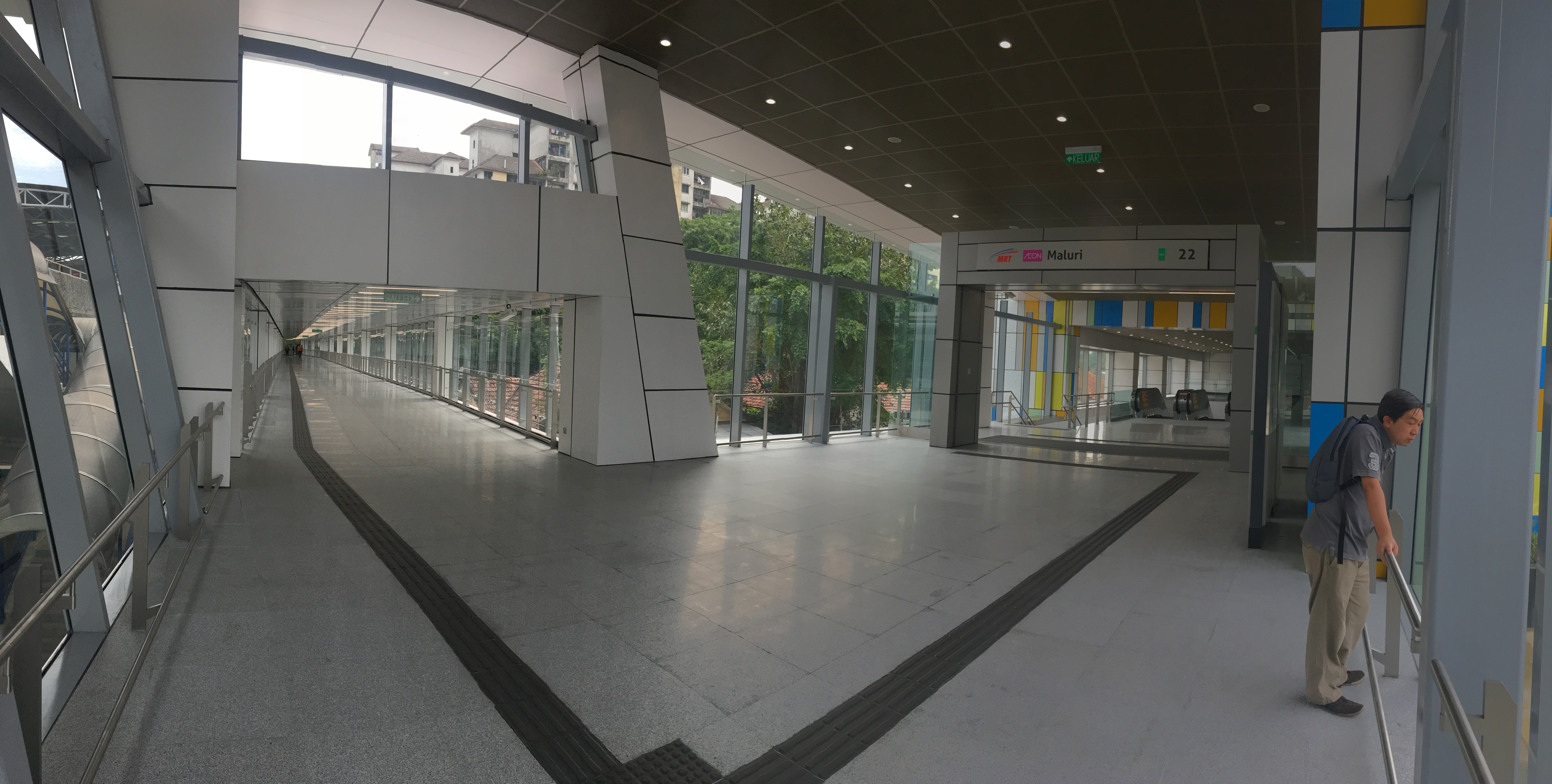
Entrance C (right) of the Maluri MRT Station which leads to the linkway (left)

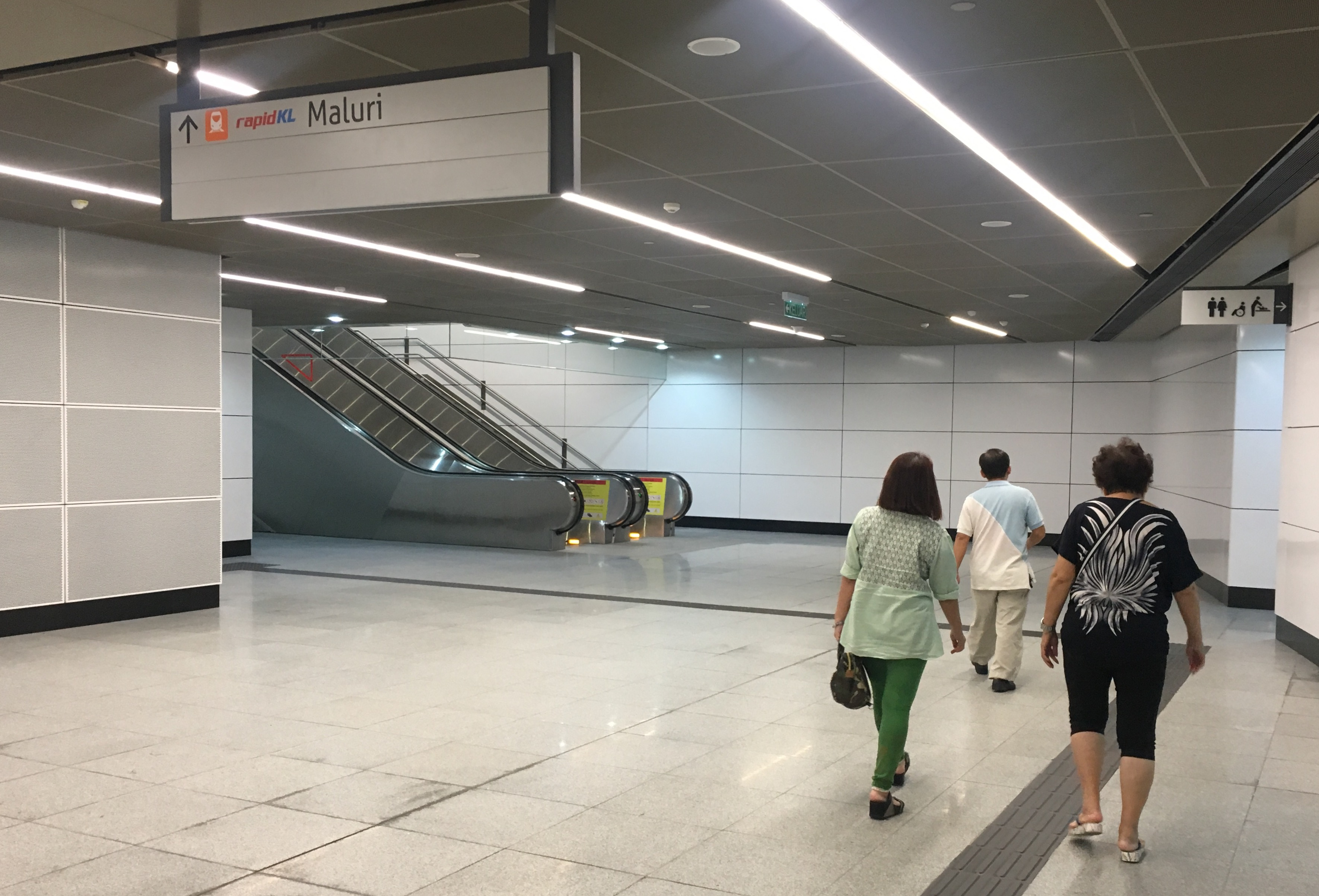
Escalators at concourse paid area to the linkway

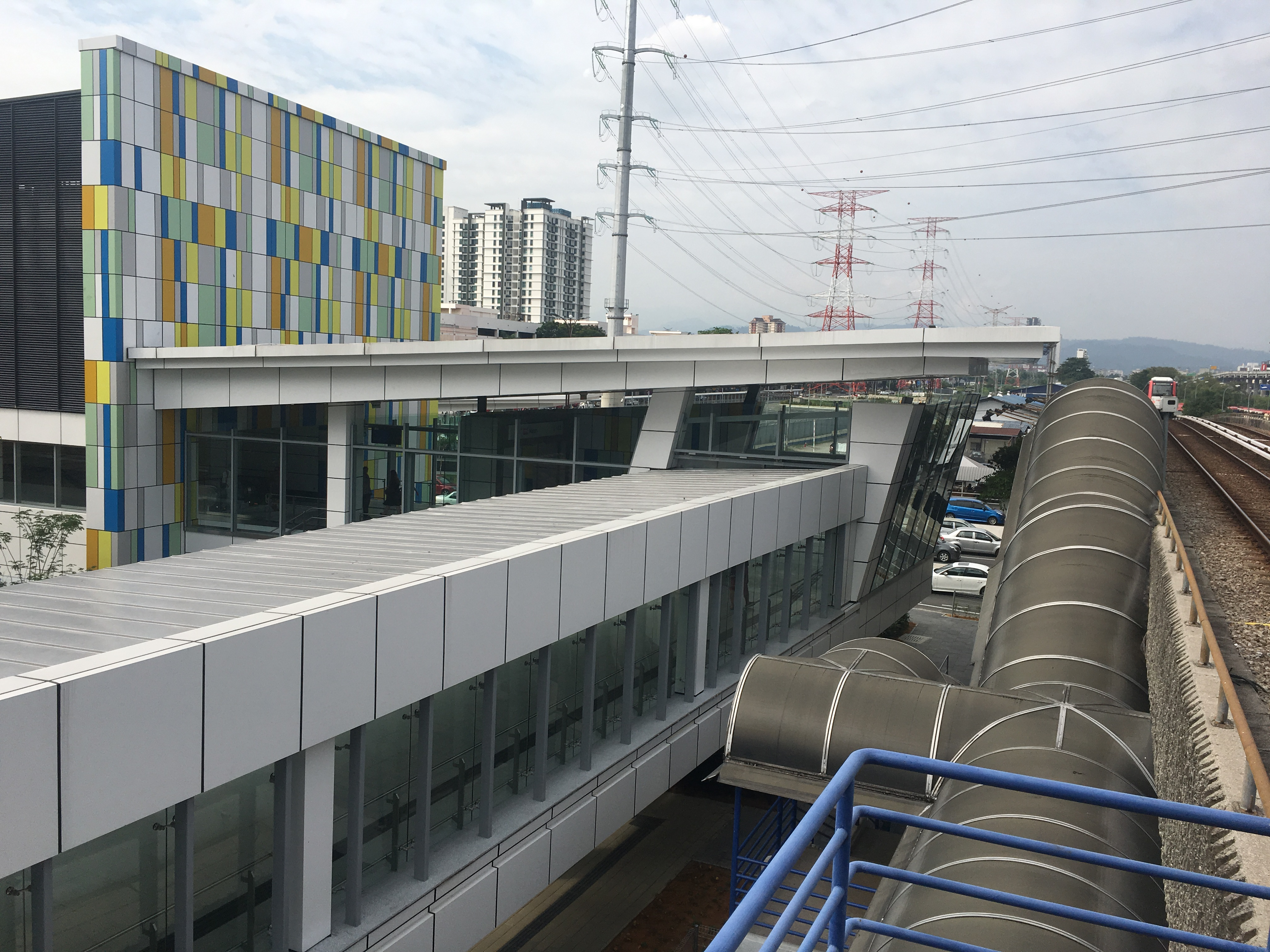
External view of the LRT-MRT linkway entering the MRT station

== See also ==
- Maluri
