= Pandan Jaya LRT station =

Railway station in Ampang Jaya, Malaysia

AG14 Pandan Jaya
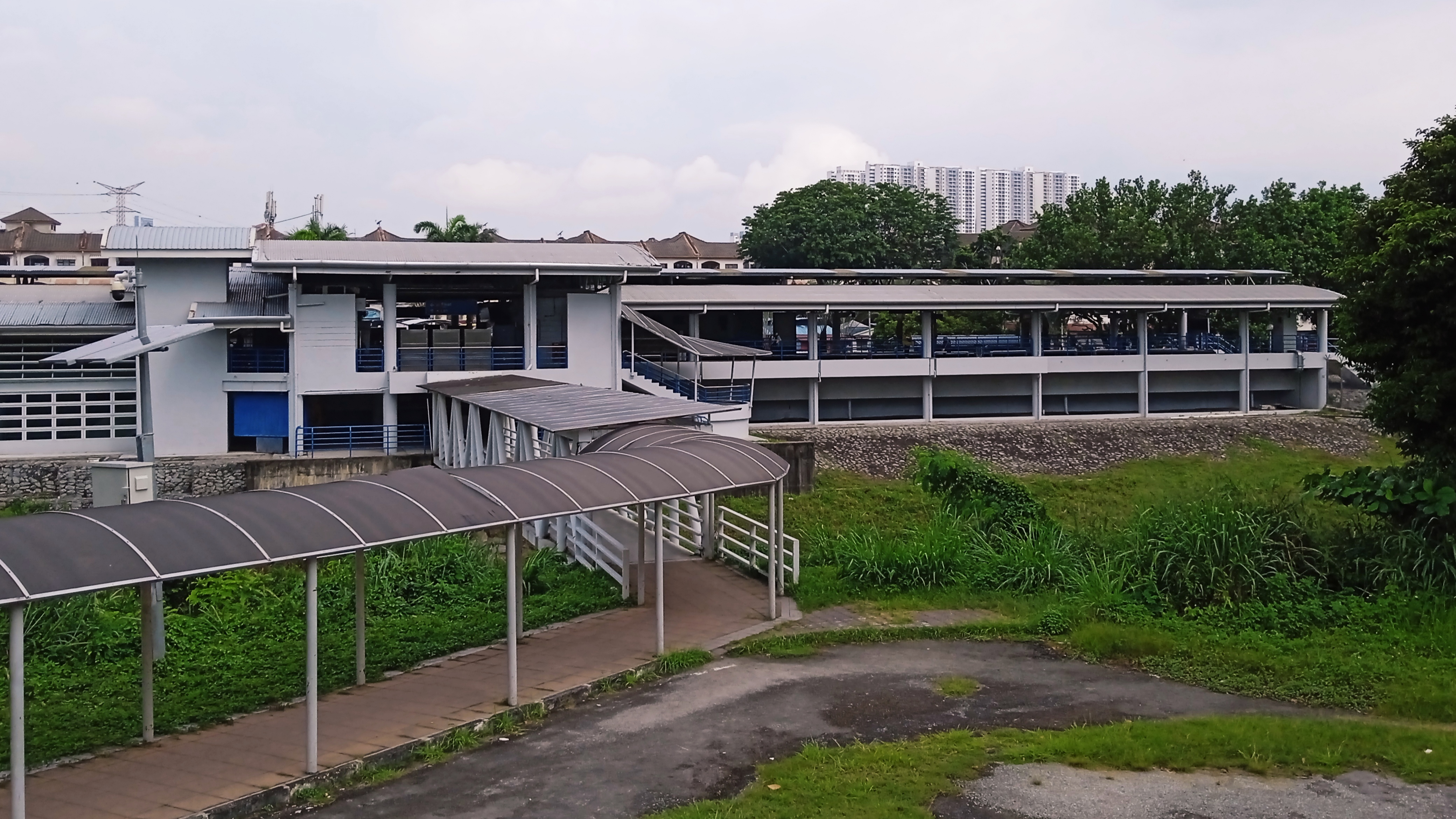
- An exterior view of the station from the Sungai Besi Expressway.

General information
- Other names: Malay: ڤندن جاي (Jawi); Chinese: 班登再也; Tamil: பாண்டான் ஜெயா
- Location: Jalan Pandan 3/8 and Jalan Pandan Indah, Pandan Jaya, 55100 Ampang Jaya; Selangor; Malaysia
- Coordinates: 3°7′48″N 101°44′19″E
- System: Rapid KL
- Owner: Prasarana Malaysia
- Operator: Rapid Rail
- Line: 3 Ampang Line
- Platforms: 2 side platforms
- Tracks: 2

Construction
- Structure type: Low-rise
- Parking: Available with payment. 279 total parking bays.

Other information
- Station code: AG14

History
- Opened: 16 December 1996; 29 years ago

Services
Preceding station		Following station
Maluri towards Sentul Timur	Ampang Line	Pandan Indah towards Ampang
Location

The Pandan Jaya LRT station is a Malaysian low-rise light rapid transit (LRT) station situated near and named after Pandan Jaya, in Ampang, Selangor. The station is part of the LRT Ampang Line (formerly known as the STAR LRT line). The station was opened on 16 December 1996, as part of the first phase of the STAR LRT system's opening, alongside 13 adjoining stations along the Sultan Ismail-Ampang route.

The station shares a similar name with the neighbouring Pandan Indah station located 1 kilometre northeast, often leading to some confusion among passengers.

== Location ==
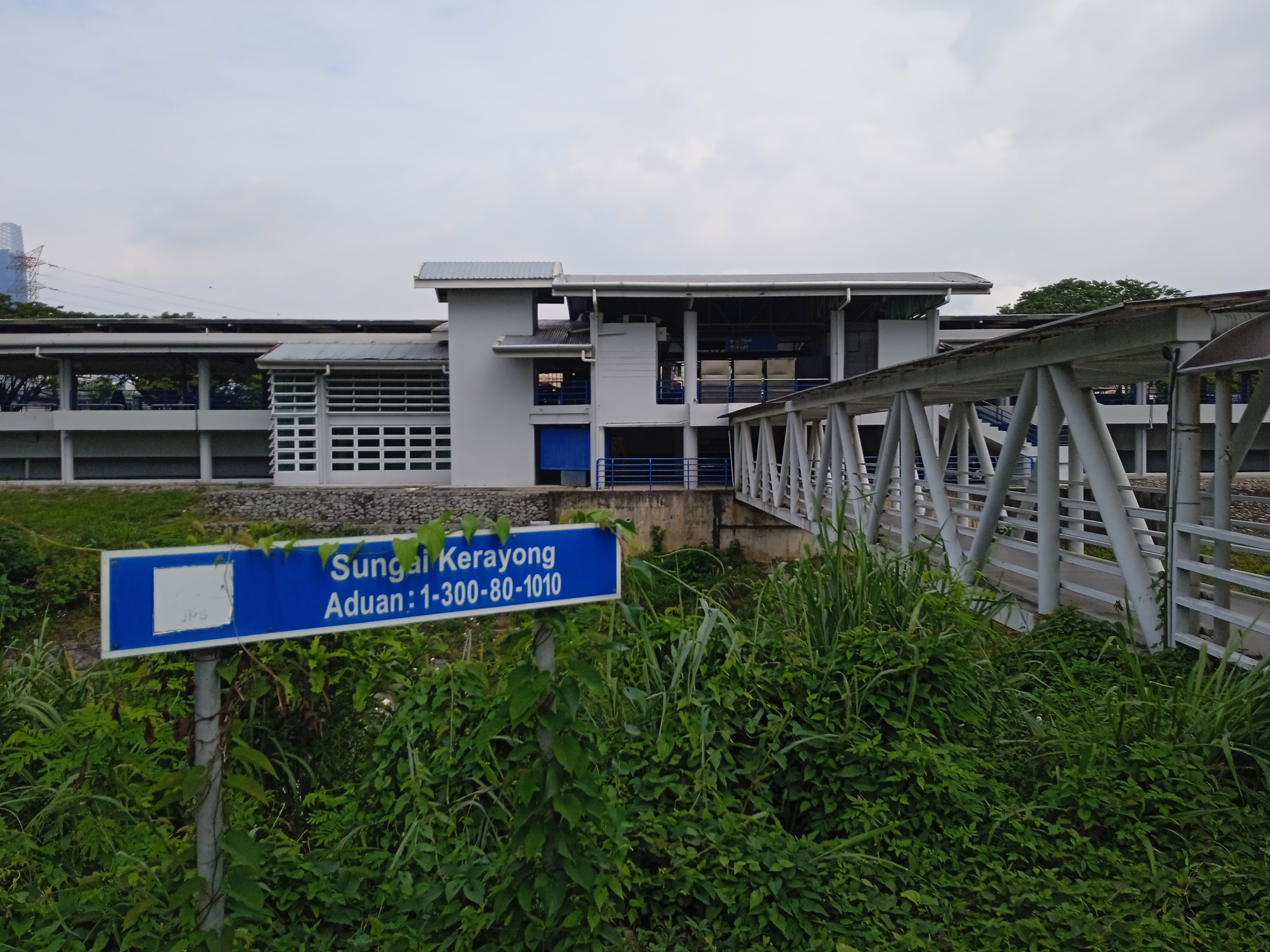
Overall view of station from the street level

The Pandan Jaya station is situated in and named after the Ampang locality of Pandan Jaya, and is within walking distance of the village of Kampung Kerayong to the west and the localities of Taman Shamelin Perkasa, Taman Maju Jaya and Taman Cheras Indah to the south. The station is also situated beside the Kerayong River, which borders Pandan Jaya and the other aforementioned areas. The station is accessible from Pandan Jaya via a complex of flats to the north, and a footbridge across the Kerayong River to Jalan Pandan Indah to the south.

The station was constructed along two levelled tracks, reusing the now defunct Federated Malay States Railway (FMSR) and Keretapi Tanah Melayu (KTM) route between Kuala Lumpur, Ampang and Salak South.

== See also ==
- List of rail transit stations in Klang Valley
