= Chan Sow Lin =

Malayan industrialist of Chinese descent

- 陳秀連
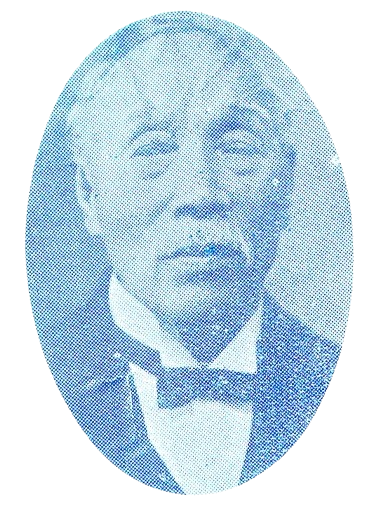
- A portrait of Chan Sow Lin
- Born: 1845; Panyu, Guangdong, Qing dynasty
- Died: 5 June 1927 (aged 81–82); Kuala Lumpur, Federated Malay States, British Malaya
- Resting place: Guangdong Cemetery, Sungai Besi
- Other name: 玉池
- Occupations: Entrepreneur, Miner, Philanthropist

Chan Sow Lin
- Traditional Chinese: 陳秀連
- Simplified Chinese: 陈秀连
- Jyutping: Can^{4} Sau^{3}-lin^{4}
Transcriptions
Standard Mandarin
- Hanyu Pinyin: Chén Xiùlián
Yue: Cantonese
- Jyutping: Can^{4} Sau^{3}-lin^{4}

Chan Sow Lin was a Chinese entrepreneur that was one of the modern founding fathers of Kuala Lumpur in modern-day Malaysia. He played a significant role in restoring the peace in the Larut Wars. His pioneering in the ironwork industry earned him the title of the father of Chinese iron works in Malaya. He was also a philanthropist and his legacies can be seen throughout the city.

== Early life ==
Chan was born into a poor family in the Panyu District (part of Guangzhou city now), Guangdong of the Qing dynasty in 1845. At the age of 16, Chan migrated to British Malaya. He started working in Taiping under Low Sam in tin mining. Chan quickly proved himself useful, and was appointed to supervise the tin mines at Assam Kumbang, Taiping within a few months. And a year later, he was given full authority by Low Sam to take charge of all his mining interests in Larut district.

After an undereducated childhood, Chan sought a private tutor to learn how to read and write in Chinese, and later learned the local Malay language.

== Involvement in Larut Wars ==
Chan was involved in the Larut Wars, a series of wars waged between dialect group Ghee Hin and Hai San. While participating in the conflict between Si Yap and Chung Loong groups, he was seriously wounded and was treated in Penang.

At the end of the war, Taiping was captured by British troops. However, there were some unsatisfied members who wanted to start another war. Chan acted promptly to act as mediator between both parties. He offered to arrange a dinner to convince both parties that it was in their interest to keep the peace. Chan offered himself as the hostage to prove its sincerity to the rivals. The dinner ended with both parties agreeing to a truce.

== Business venture ==
After the war, Chan re-joined Low Sam briefly, and later founded his own tin mining business. During his time in Taiping, he met Loke Yew, fellow Chinese migrant who later came to be the richest man in British Malaya.

In 1883, Chan and Loke Yew moved to Selangor together due to the war in Perak, The Selangor Government welcomed fresh investments and barren lands and tin mines, as the economy was being affected by the war in Perak. Barren lands and tin mines leased at very low remunerations. Together, the duo became the pioneer and the largest tin mine owner.

It was also in Selangor where Chan would meet and become close friends with Cheong Yoke Choy another fellow tin mine owner and one of the early pioneers of Kuala Lumpur.

In 1893, Chan leased two rich mine lands at Serdang and Sungei Besi from Loke Yew under his firm, Chop Tan Kee, and later the mining lands at Simpah, Sungei Puteh, Kuala Kubu, Setapak, Kepong and Petaling from the government.

Chan became the first Chinese to use a tin dredge for mining tin. At that time, most of the tin dredge machinery was imported from British, which was expensive. To cut costs, Chan founded Chop Mee Lee (or known as Chan Sow Lin & Co. Ltd) in Jalan Ampang, an ironwork foundry that focused on producing high quality tools, machinery for mining and construction. He employed technicians from Guang Zhou and Hong Kong to train local labor in the engineering works. His success spawned the establishment of other foundries in the area, and helped develop the economy of Kuala Lumpur.

== Philanthropy and other work ==
Chan was the chairman of the Selangor Anti-Opium Society and the Selangor Chuan Hong Chinese School. He was the trustee of Sin Sze Si Ya Temple’s assets.

Chan also succeeded Loke Yew to become the president of the Selangor Chinese Chamber of Commerce, from 1907 to 1909.

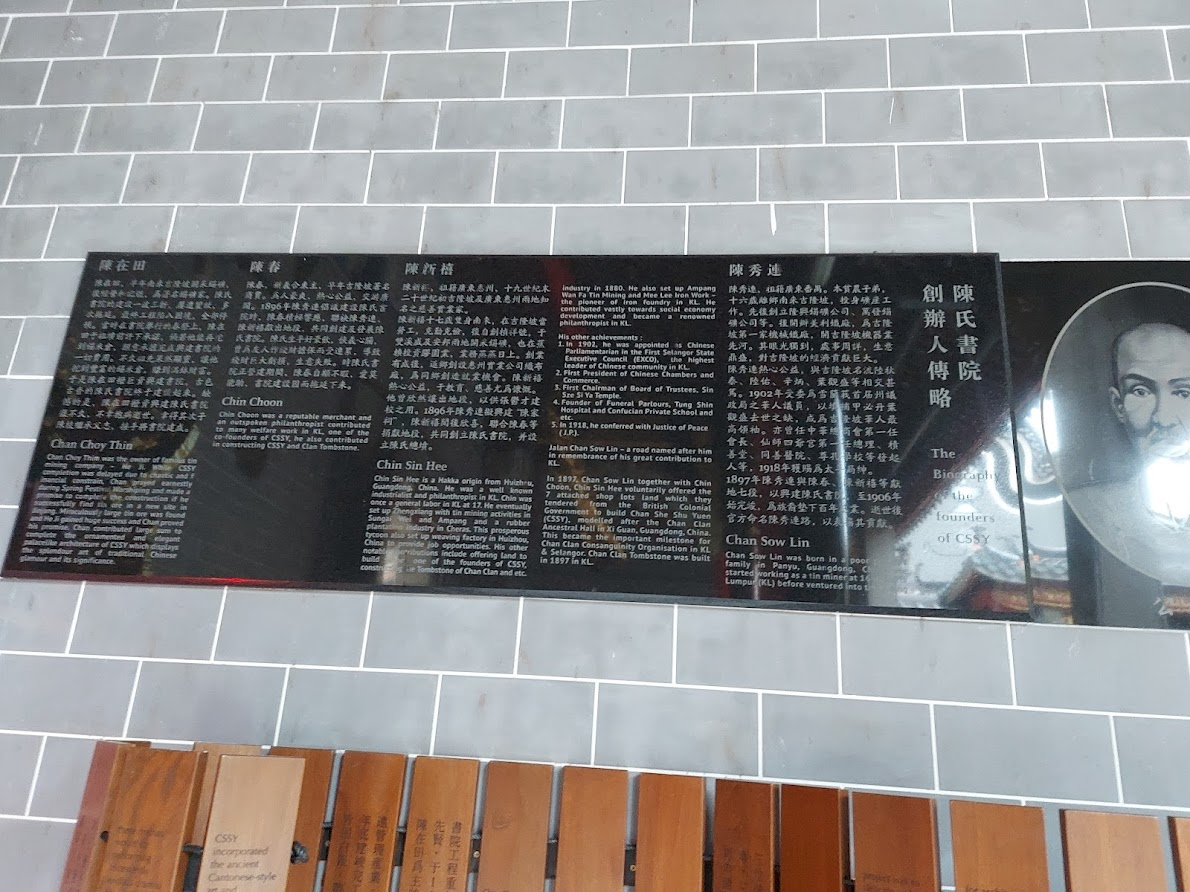
Chan Sow Lin's biography as seen in Chan She Shu Yuen Clan, Kuala Lumpur.

He is one of the co-founders of Tung Shin Hospital, Jishangtang Charity Hall, and Chan She Shu Yuen (Chan Clan Temple) at Petaling Street, Kuala Lumpur. He was a trustee of the Victoria Institution. He was also an appointed member of the Selangor State Council (1902–1921), a member of Visiting Committee of the Selangor Goal, the Lunatic Asylum and the Selangor General Hospital.

== Achievements ==
In 1906, a special commissioner on education to the Malay States was sent by the viceroy of Guangdong under the decree of the emperor of China. After visiting the Chinese-owned companies and tin mines, the commissioner had written a report to the viceroy praising Chan's role in promoting Chinese culture, knowledge and technology in his business in the Malay states. For this, the viceroy awarded him a medal.

He was awarded another medal by Wong, the Chinese ambassador to England (Malaya was under British rule at the time) for his philanthropic work.

== Personal life ==
Chan had four sons.

On 8 June 1927, Chan died at his residence at 20 Klyne Street, Kuala Lumpur. He was buried at the Guangdong Cemetery in Sungei Besi, Malaysia.

=== Legacy ===
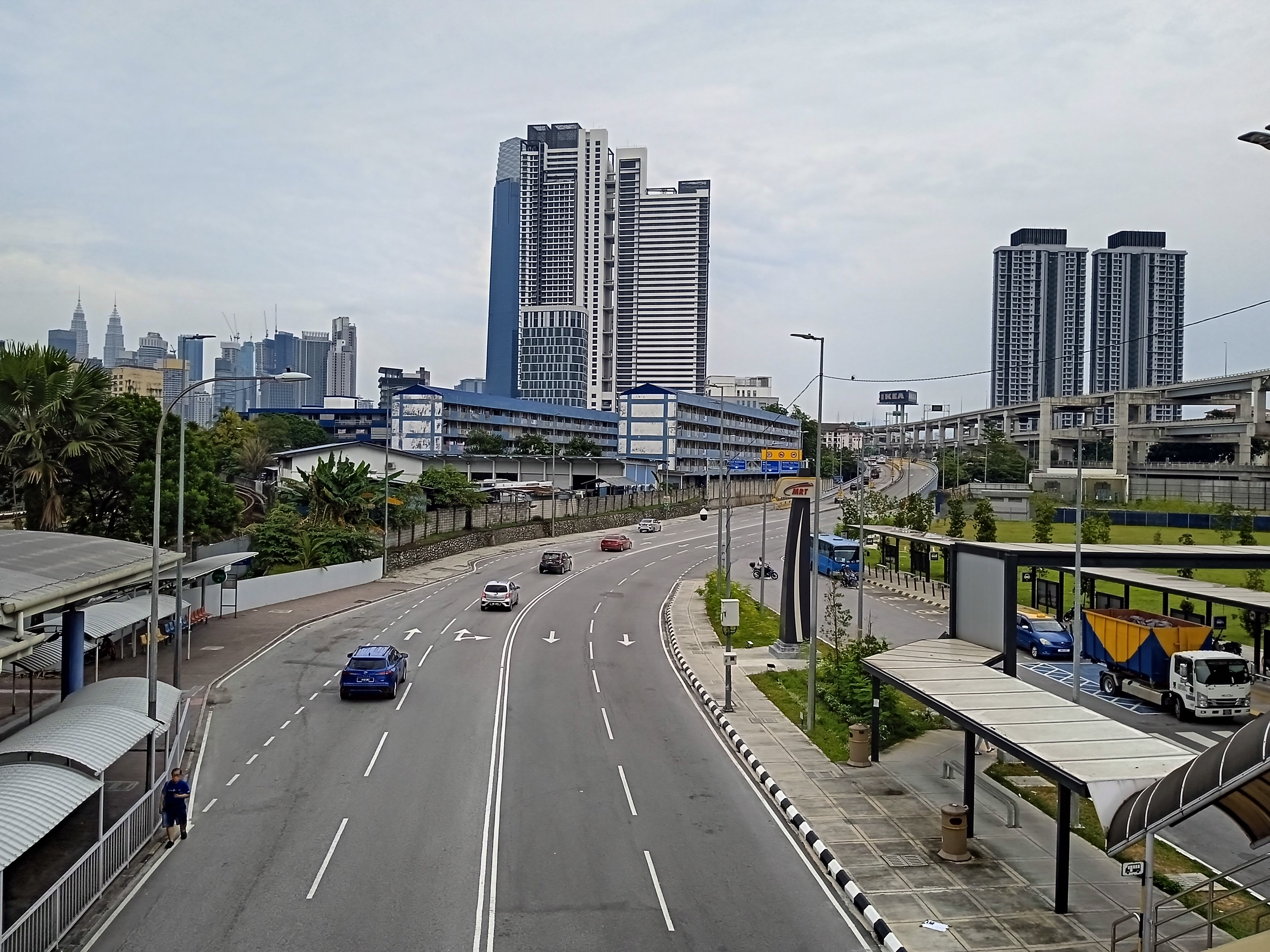
Jalan Chan Sow Lin, 2024

The British Malayan government named a road Jalan Chan Sow Lin, after him, to commemorate his contributions to the development of Kuala Lumpur. It is said that the road was famous for ironworks, even after his death. The road is nestled between the Sungai Besi airport and Pudu and is now an industrial zone.

The Chan Sow Lin station, named after Jalan Chan Sow Lin, serves as the interchange station between the LRT Sri Petaling Line, LRT Ampang Line and MRT Putrajaya Line.
