= Miharja LRT station =

Railway station in Miharja, Malaysia

AG12 Miharja
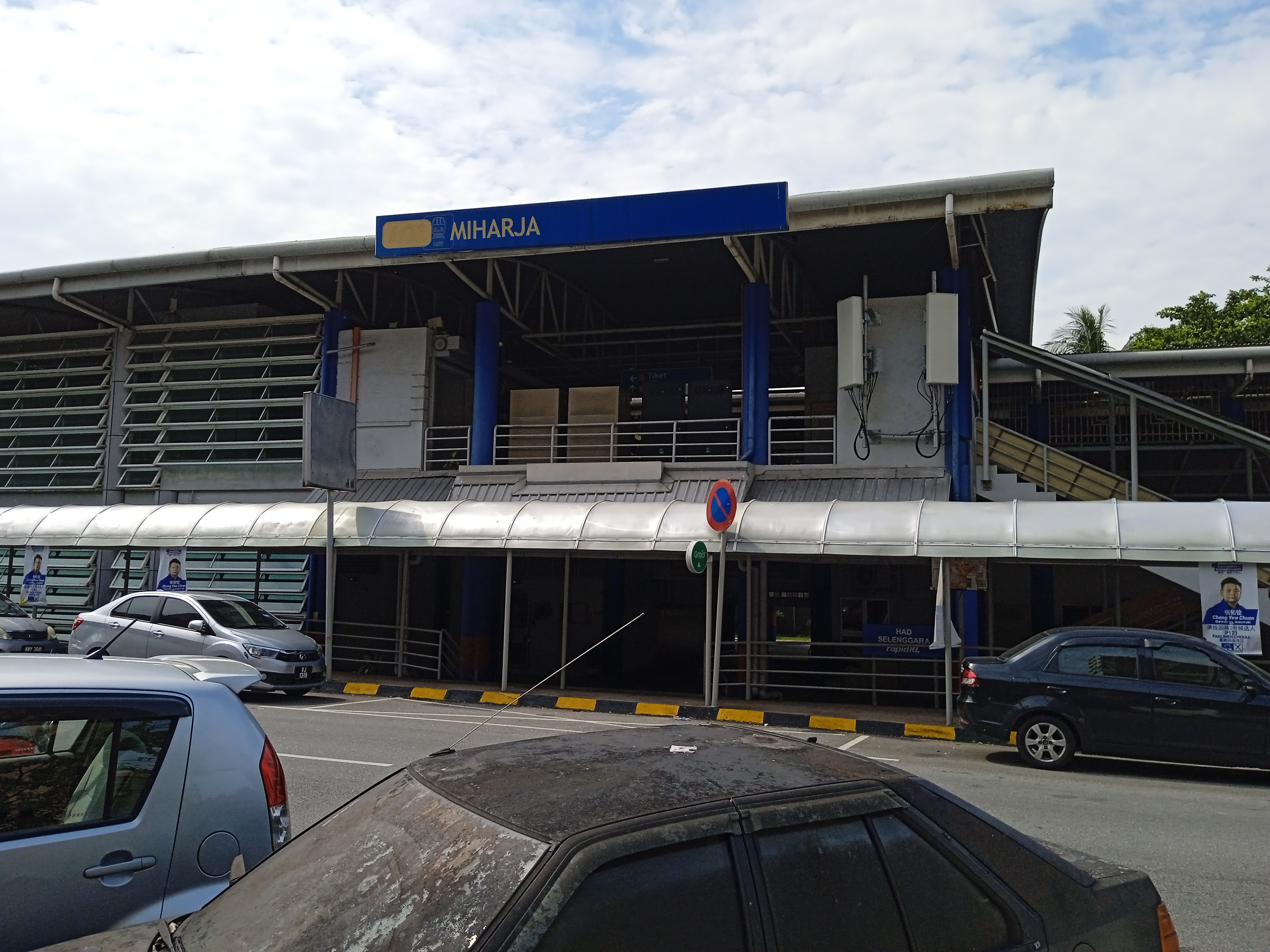
- An exterior view of the station, as viewed towards the west.

General information
- Other names: Malay: ميهرجا (Jawi); Chinese: 美和家; Tamil: மிகார்ஜா
- Location: Jalan 1/93, Taman Miharja; 55200 Kuala Lumpur; Malaysia
- Coordinates: 3°7′15″N 101°43′3″E
- System: Rapid KL
- Owner: Prasarana Malaysia
- Operator: Rapid Rail
- Line: 3 Ampang Line
- Platforms: 2 side platforms
- Tracks: 2

Construction
- Structure type: Low-rise
- Parking: Not available

Other information
- Station code: AG12

History
- Opened: 6 December 1996; 29 years ago

Services
Preceding station		Following station
Chan Sow Lin towards Sentul Timur	Ampang Line	Maluri towards Ampang
Location

Miharja LRT station is a Malaysian low-rise light rapid transit (LRT) station situated near and named after Taman Miharja (Malay; English: Miharja Estate). The station is part of the LRT Ampang Line. (formerly known as the STAR LRT line)

The station was opened on 16 December 1996, as part of the first phase of the STAR LRT system's opening, alongside 13 adjoining stations along the Sultan Ismail-Ampang route.

== Location ==
The station is situated at the southwestern side of the Miharja Flats, a complex of flats close to the Kerayong River in the locality of Taman Miharja, off Jalan Loke Yew (Loke Yew Road). The station directly serves the aforementioned flats, as well as the remaining portion of Taman Miharja and the Viva Home Shopping Mall from the opposite side of Jalan Loke Yew which also has similarly close access to Maluri station.

The Miharja station was constructed along two levelled tracks, reusing the now defunct Federated Malay States Railway (FMSR) and Keretapi Tanah Melayu (KTM) route between Kuala Lumpur, Ampang and Salak South. The station is also the last station from Ampang before a convergence with the Putra Heights-bound route of the LRT Sri Petaling Line and Chan Sow Lin station, 850 metres northward, where the lines merge to form the common route of the Ampang and Sri Petaling Lines towards Sentul Timur.

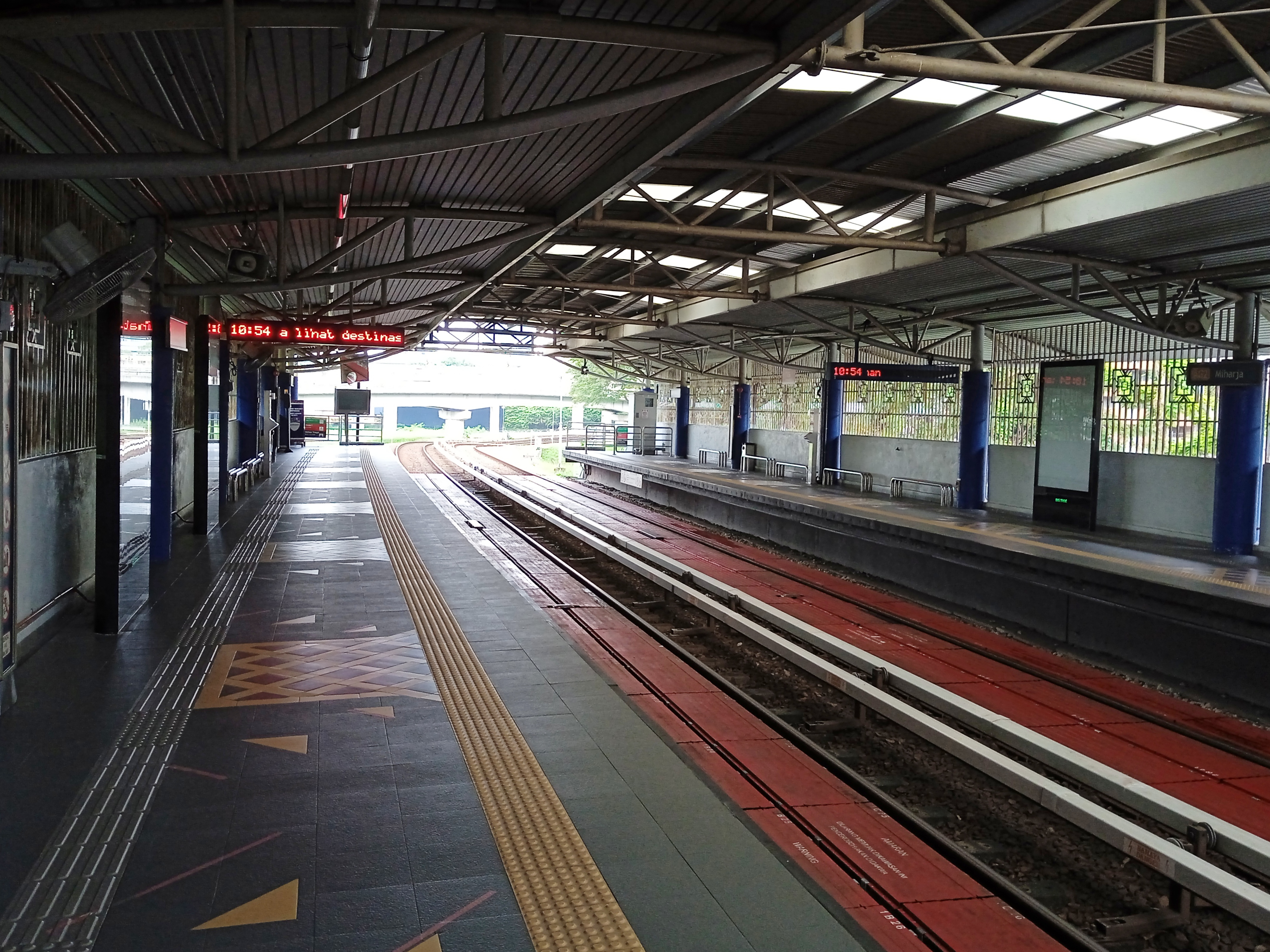
Another platform view of Miharja station.

== See also ==
- List of rail transit stations in Klang Valley
