= Chan Sow Lin station =

Integrated metro station in Pudu, Kuala Lumpur, Malaysia

AG11 SP11 PY24 Chan Sow Lin
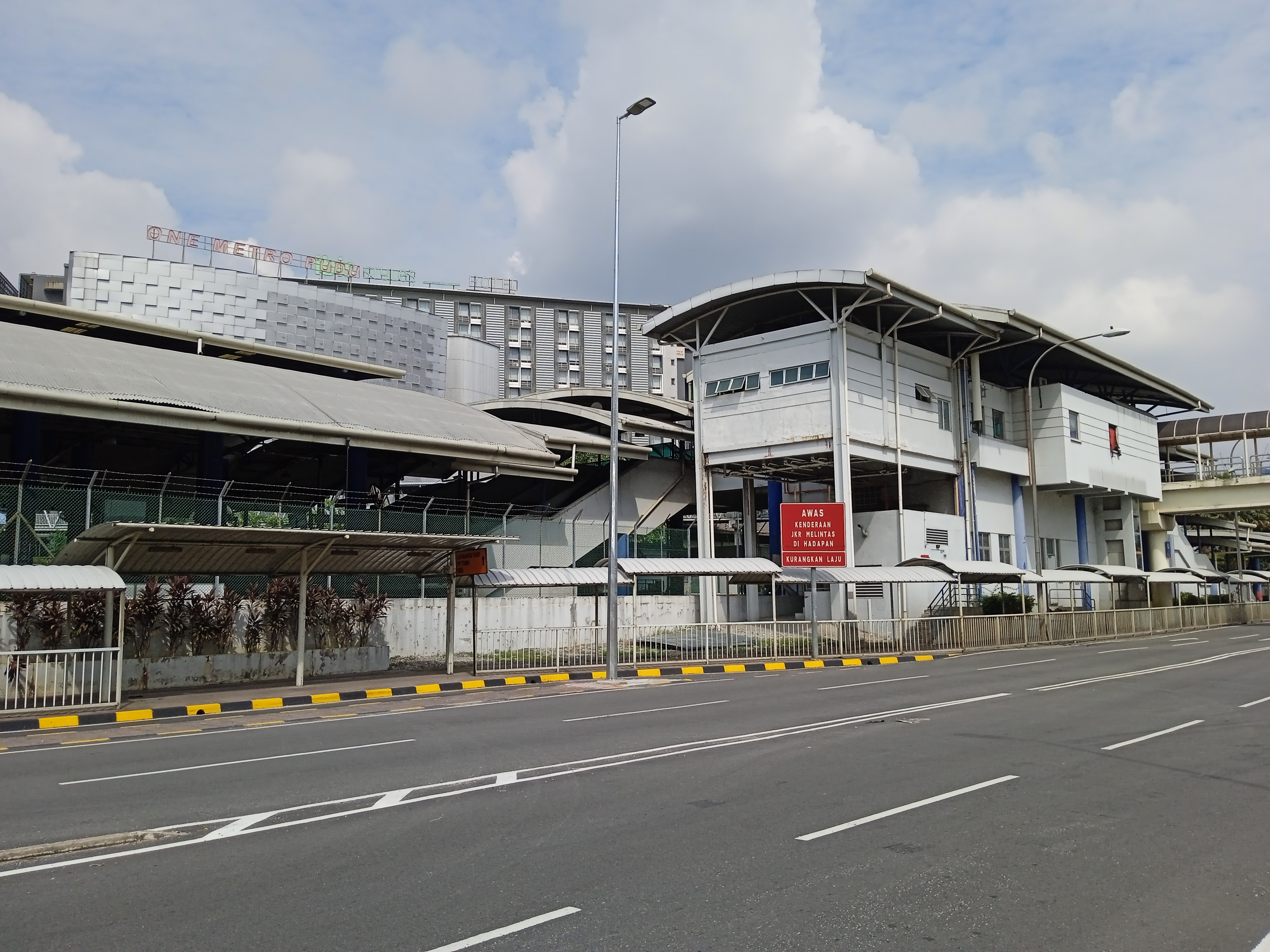
- Street view of the LRT Chan Sow Lin station.

General information
- Other names: Malay: چن ساو لين (Jawi); Chinese: 陈秀连; Tamil: சான் சோவ் லின்
- Location: Jalan Chan Sow Lin, Pudu; 55200 Kuala Lumpur; Malaysia
- Coordinates: 3°7′40″N 101°42′55″E
- System: Rapid KL
- Owner: Prasarana Malaysia (LRT); MRT Corp (MRT)
- Operator: Rapid Rail
- Lines: 3 Ampang Line; 4 Sri Petaling Line; 12 Putrajaya Line
- Platforms: 2 island platforms (LRT); 1 island platform (MRT)
- Tracks: 3 (LRT); 2 (MRT)

Construction
- Structure type: AG11 SP11 Ground level; PY24 Underground
- Depth: 38 metres (125 ft)
- Parking: Not available

Other information
- Station code: AG11 SP11 PY24

History
- Opened: 16 December 1996; 29 years ago (LRT); 16 March 2023; 3 years ago (MRT)

Services
Preceding station		Following station
Pudu towards Sentul Timur	Ampang Line	Miharja towards Ampang
Pudu towards Sentul Timur	Sri Petaling Line	Cheras towards Putra Heights
Tun Razak Exchange towards Kwasa Damansara	Putrajaya Line	Kuchai towards Putrajaya Sentral
Tun Razak Exchange towards Kwasa Damansara	Putrajaya Line Future service	Bandar Malaysia Utara towards Putrajaya Sentral
Location

Chan Sow Lin station is an integrated metro station in Pudu, Kuala Lumpur, Malaysia. The station serves as an interchange station between the LRT Ampang/Sri Petaling lines and the MRT Putrajaya line. The station consists of an at-grade station for the Ampang/Sri Petaling lines portion, and an underground station for the Putrajaya Line portion. Both stations are connected by an elevated pedestrian walkway, allowing paid-to-paid area integration.

The station is the first station on the common route shared by both the Ampang Line (Sentul Timur-Ampang) and Sri Petaling Line (Sentul Timur-Putra Heights). The station was first opened on 16 December 1996, as part of the first phase of the former STAR LRT system's opening, alongside 13 adjoining stations along the Sultan Ismail-Ampang route.

Chan Sow Lin is the last underground station on the Putrajaya Line, before the line resurfaces at Kuchai station.

== Location ==
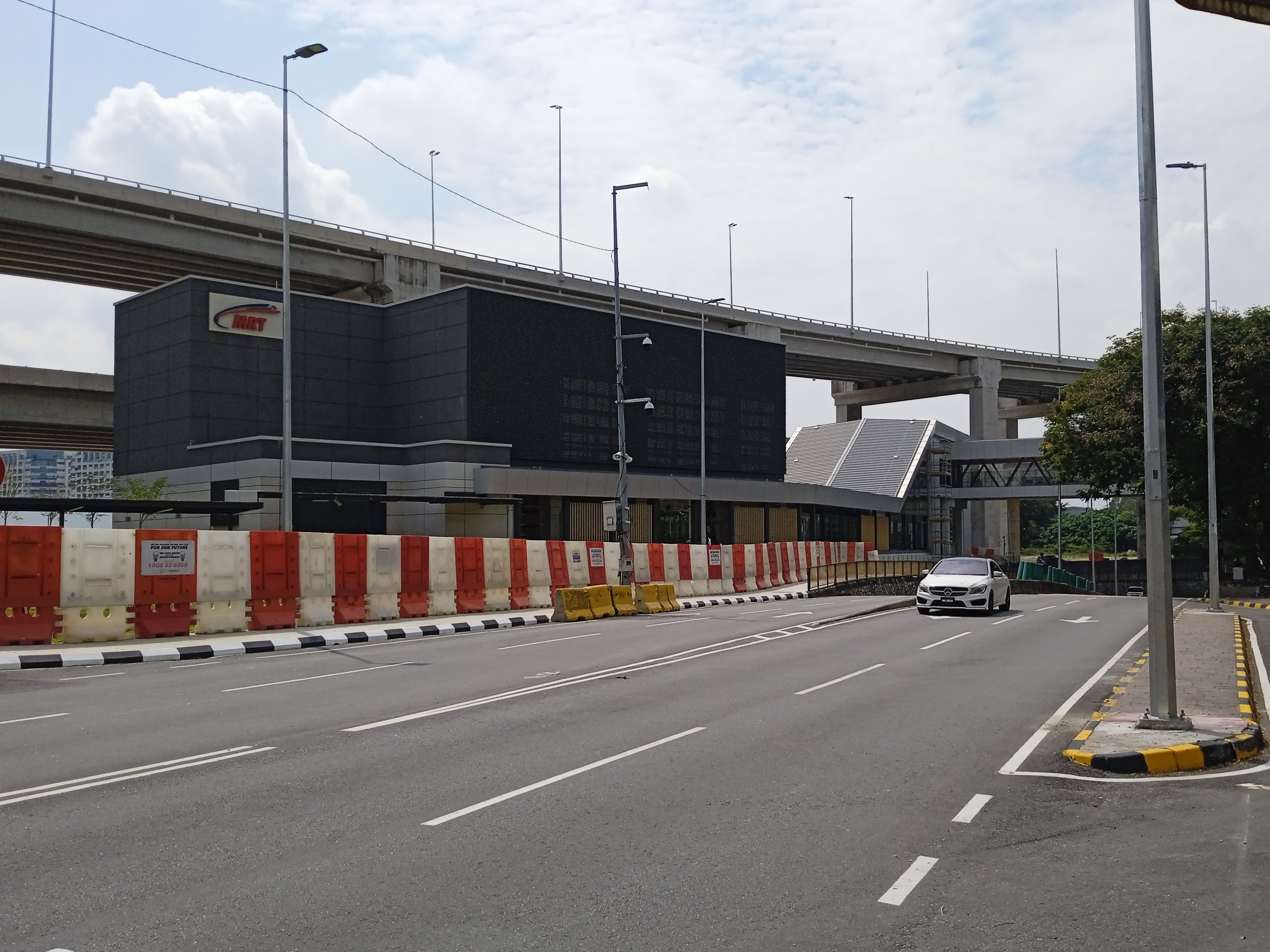
Entrance B of Chan Sow Lin MRT station along Jalan Chan Sow Lin

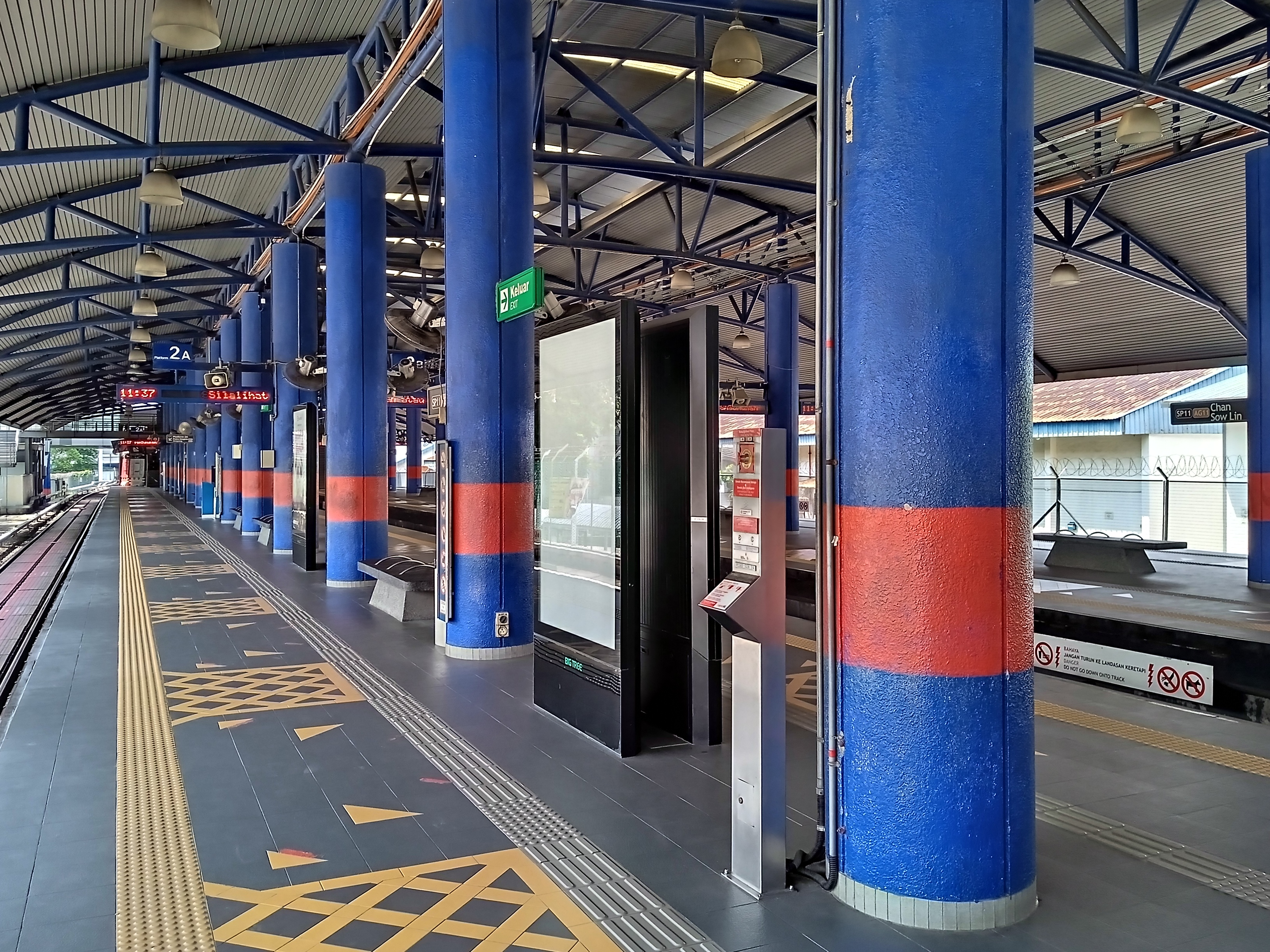
Platform 2A and Platform 2B at the station served LRT Ampang and Sri Petaling lines

The station is located on the southern edge of the incorporated town of Pudu, serving the locality alongside Pudu and Hang Tuah stations. The station was thus intended to serve patrons from the southern end of Pudu, the western end of Taman Maluri and the northwestern tip of Taman Miharja. The latter two localities also have their own namesake stations towards the south and east: Miharja and Maluri stations. The interchange itself is named after an extended portion of Jalan Chan Sow Lin, a road that adjoins the main entrance of the station. The road was named after Chan Sow Lin (陳秀連), 1845–1927, a wealthy businessman in the iron works industry. This man was also known then as The Father of Chinese Iron Works in Malaya.

The station reuses the now defunct Federated Malay States Railway and Keretapi Tanah Melayu (KTM) route between Kuala Lumpur, Ampang and Salak South. Because of this, the station is located close to several former government compounds (Public Works and Engineering Works branches) that were once connected to the KTM line, up until the line was closed during the 1990s to make way for the STAR LRT line.

The newer MRT station was built underground across Jalan Chan Sow Lin road from the LRT portion. The two stations are connected by a series of escalators and an overhead pedestrian bridge that crosses over Jalan Chan Sow Lin, providing commuters a direct link between the stations without needing to tap out and purchase a new ticket when transferring lines.

== Ampang-Chan Sow Lin shuttle service ==
=== 2016 Train replacement ===
Between July and December 2016, upon the opening of the Puchong Perdana-Putra Heights stretch of the LRT Sri Petaling Line Extension and the full deployment of the new CSR Zhuzhou trains on the Sentul Timur-Putra Heights stretch, the old Adtranz trains in use since 1996 were reduced to serve only the Ampang-Chan Sow Lin stretch pending the completion of the upgrading of the signalling system on the line. Commuters going from Ampang to the Kuala Lumpur city centre (i.e. Masjid Jamek) or vice versa were required to alight at Chan Sow Lin and switch from the Adtranz trains to the new CSR Zhuzhou trains.

Direct travel between Ampang and Sentul Timur, as it was before July 2016, was restored on 1 December 2016, following the completion of the upgrading of the signalling system on the Ampang-Chan Sow Lin stretch, which also sees the wholescale replacement of the old Adtranz trains with the new CSR Zhuzhou trains.

=== May 2026 derailment ===
The shuttle service was once again reactivated as a temporary mode after a train had derail due to a track switch malfunction between Chan Sow Lin and Miharja on 28 May 2026.

== Gallery ==
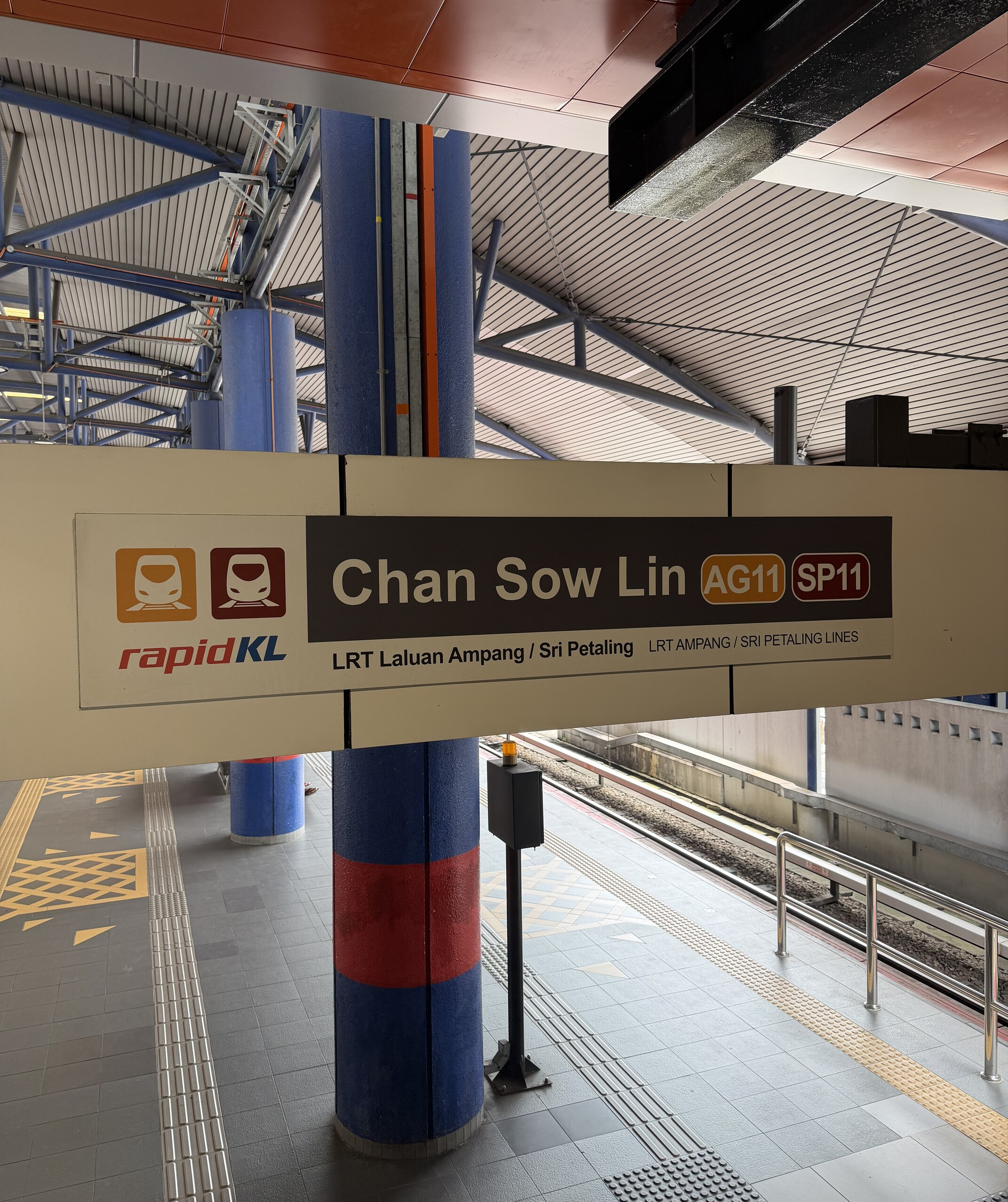
View of the LRT board platform entrance portion of the station coming from the MRT link bridge

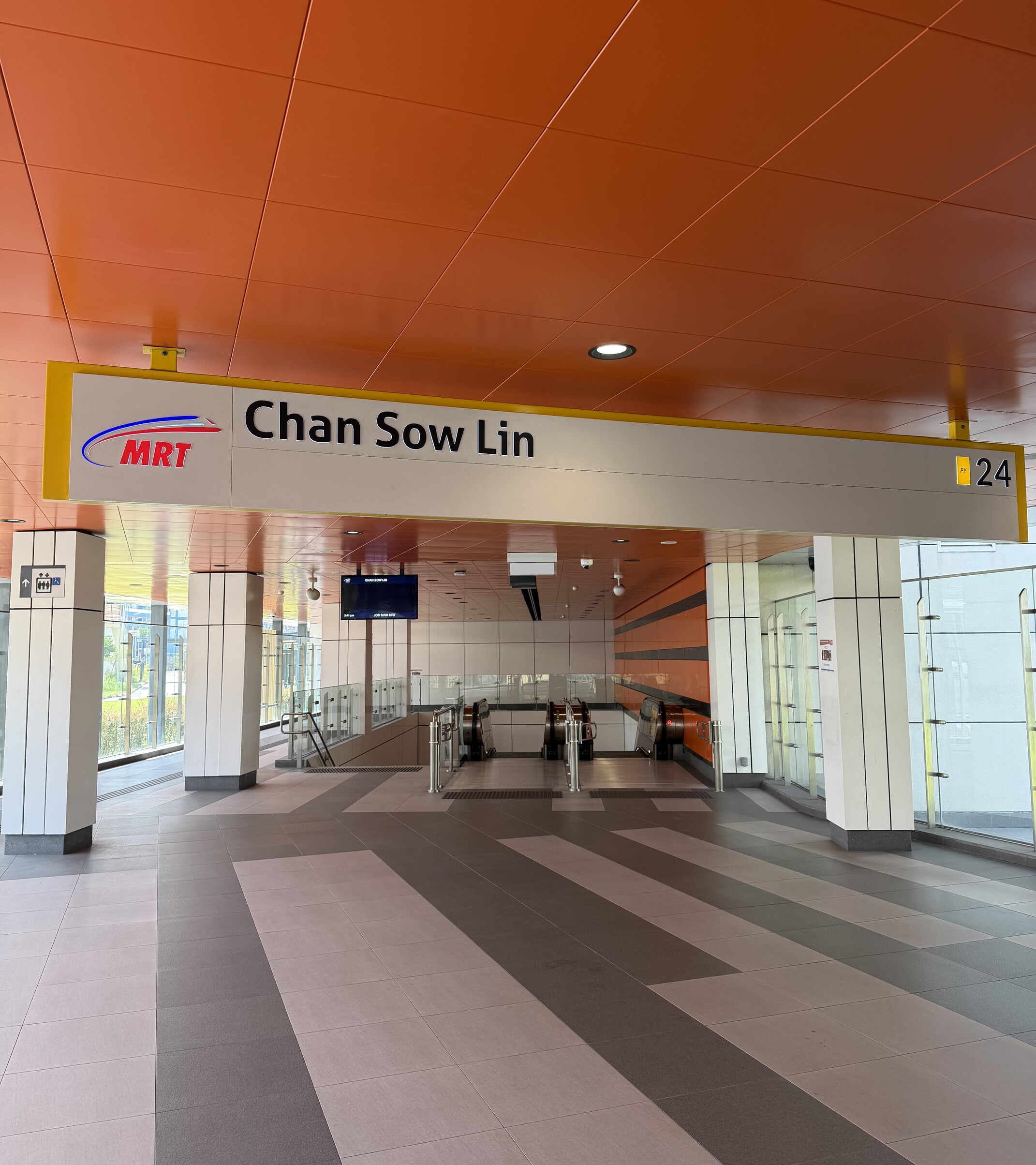
View of the MRT board entrance portion of the station coming from the LRT link bridge

== See also ==
- Maluri LRT station, similar layout and function
- List of rail transit stations in Klang Valley
