= Cheras LRT station =

Metro station in Kuala Lumpur, Malaysia

SP12 Cheras
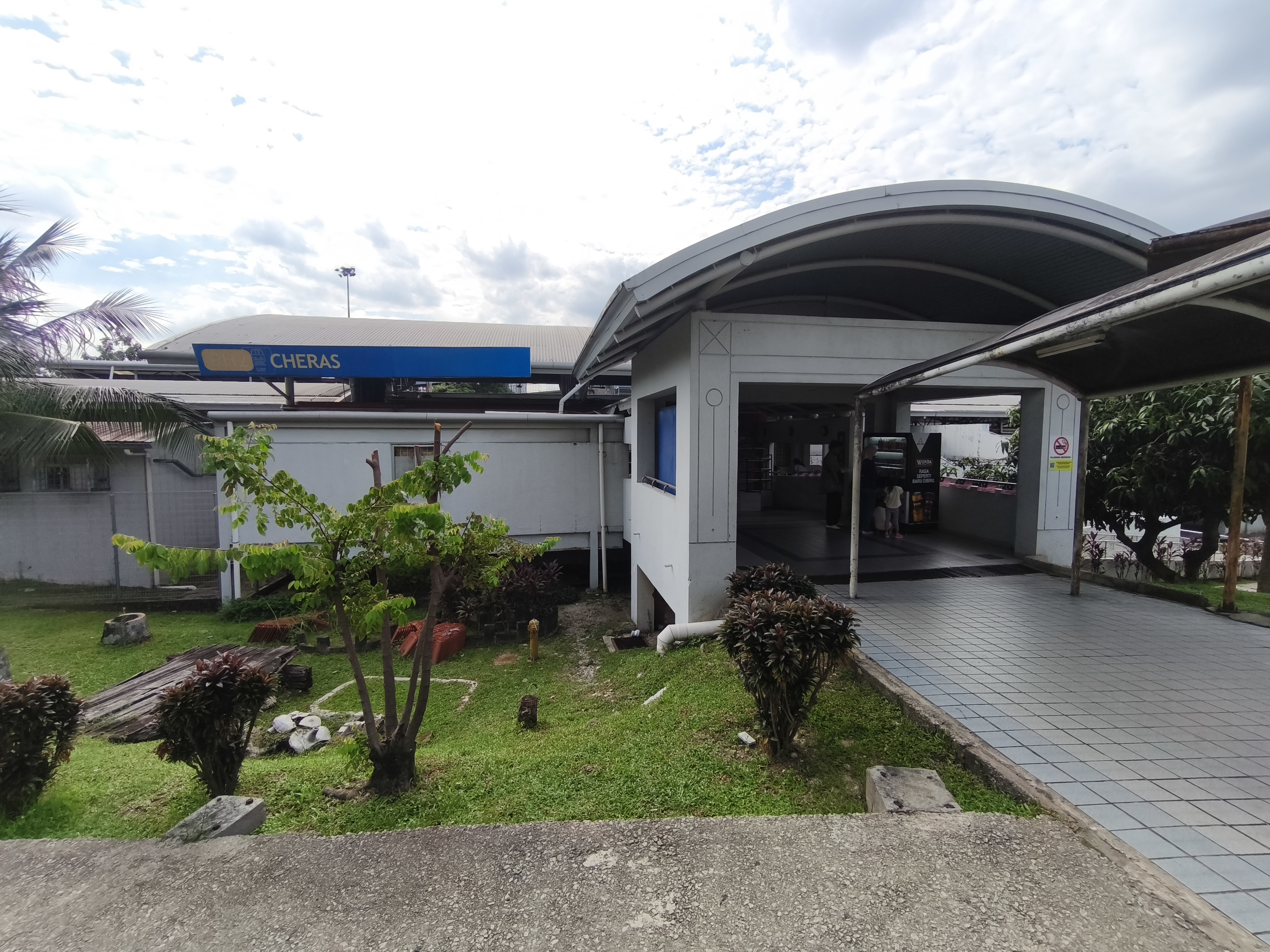
- An exterior view of the station.

General information
- Other names: Malay: چيراس (Jawi); Chinese: 蕉赖; Tamil: செராஸ்
- Location: Jalan Jelawat Satu and Jalan 3/12, Taman Ikan Emas; 57100 Kuala Lumpur; Malaysia
- Coordinates: 3°6′45″N 101°42′51″E
- System: Rapid KL
- Owner: Prasarana Malaysia
- Operator: Rapid Rail
- Line: 4 Sri Petaling Line
- Platforms: 2 side platforms
- Tracks: 2

Construction
- Structure type: Low-rise
- Parking: Available

Other information
- Station code: SP12

History
- Opened: 11 July 1998; 28 years ago
- Former names: Seri Mas

Services
Preceding station		Following station
Chan Sow Lin towards Sentul Timur	Sri Petaling Line	Salak Selatan towards Putra Heights
Location

Cheras LRT station is a Malaysian light rapid transit (LRT) station situated near and named after the Kuala Lumpur township of Cheras. The station is part of the LRT Sri Petaling Line (formerly known as STAR LRT line).

The station was opened on 11 July 1998, as part of the second phase of the STAR LRT system's opening, including 7 new stations along the Chan Sow Lin-Sri Petaling route.At that time, Cheras station was named "Seri Mas".

== Location ==
Despite its name, Cheras station is not located within the Kuala Lumpur township of Cheras. Rather, the station is situated between the northern Sungai Besi region, Taman Ikan Emas and Salak South, a kilometre northwest from the nearest border to Cheras. The station is thus more accessible for users from the aforementioned areas, as well as Bandar Sri Permaisuri to the south, than Cheras itself.

The station's main access point faces the southeast towards Taman Ikan Emas and is accessible via Jalan Jelawat Satu. In the beginning of its operation, the station was primarily accessible via a footbridge crossing a ditch. Beginning in June 2007, construction work was conducted directly in front of the station, demolishing the original path and a temporary route around the construction site was established for access into the station.

Until late 2006, the western side of the station was lined along a back road that branched off Jalan 3/12, and several industrial buildings. The area has since been partially cleared away for the construction of the Maju Expressway, which opened in 2008. While the station itself is unaffected, access from the west now requires crossing an overhead bridge built together with the expressway.

The station was constructed along two levelled tracks, reusing the now defunct Federated Malay States Railway (FMSR) and Keretapi Tanah Melayu (KTM) route between Kuala Lumpur, Ampang and Salak South. The station is also the last station of the Sri Petaling Line from Putra Heights before the line merges with the LRT Ampang Line from Ampang at Chan Sow Lin station 1.5 km northward. Both lines run on the same tracks and route until their common terminus at Sentul Timur effectively making all stations between Sentul Timur and Chan Sow Lin interchange station between the two lines.

== Design ==
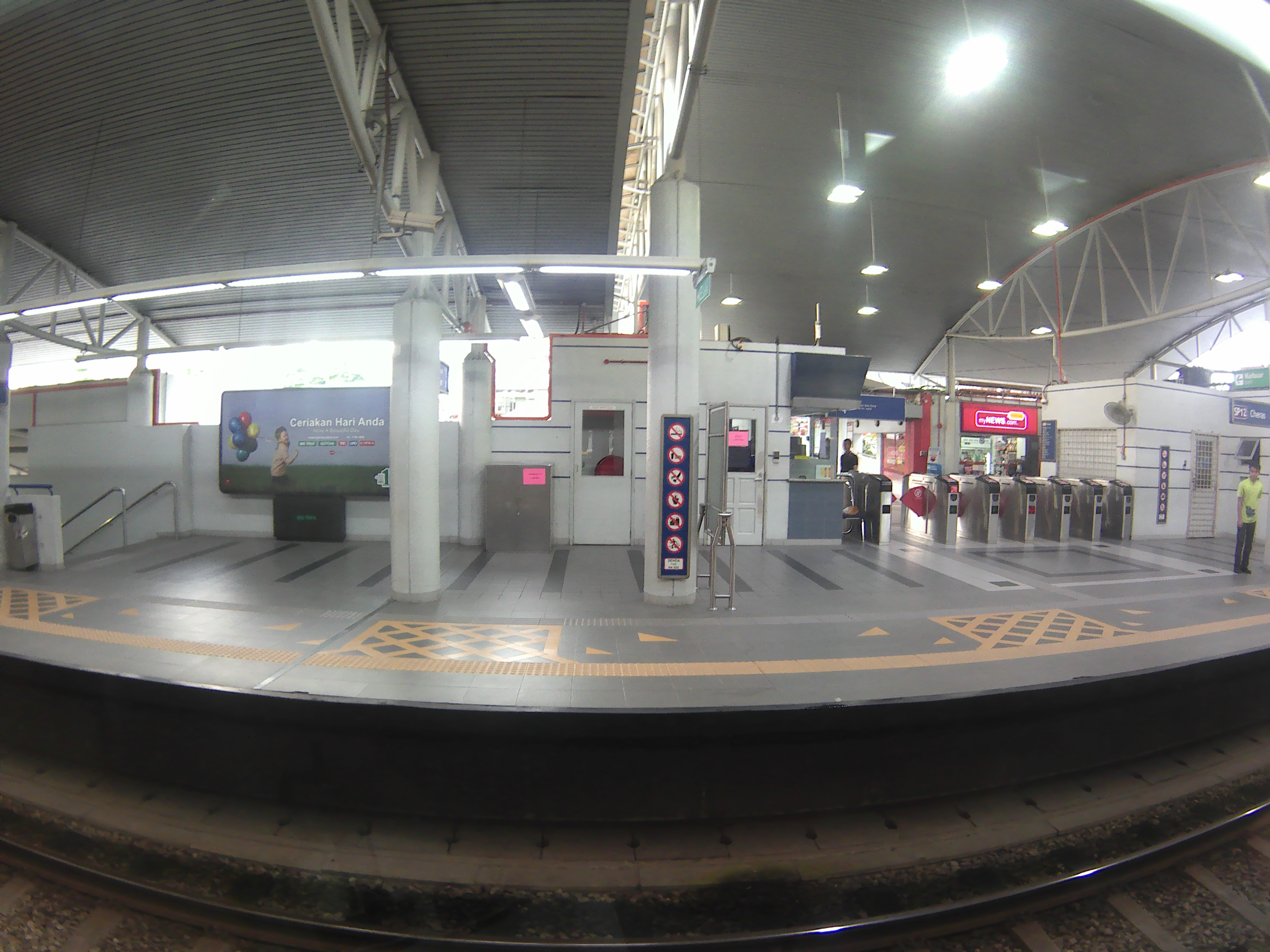
A platform view of Cheras station.

The Cheras LRT station is a low-rise structure with two side platforms lined along two tracks for trains travelling in opposite directions. However, unlike the many subsurface stations dotted along the Miharja-Ampang route, Cheras station was built on a set of tracks significantly lower than the other subsurface stations (similar to Cahaya), and only has a single ticket area, as opposed to two for each platform. An underground tunnel underneath the tracks was built linking both platforms. The station also serves as a public crossing by pedestrians and motorcyclists across the Sri Petaling Line tracks between the southeast and northwest via another underground path running beneath the tracks and platforms, parallel to the platform link tunnel.

The principal styling of the station is similar to most other stations in the line, featuring curved roofs supported by latticed frames, and white plastered walls and pillars. Elevators has since been installed in the station many years after its initial opening, making the station disabled-friendly.

== See also ==
- List of rail transit stations in Klang Valley
