= Kerayong River =

River in Kuala Lumpur and Selangor, Malaysia

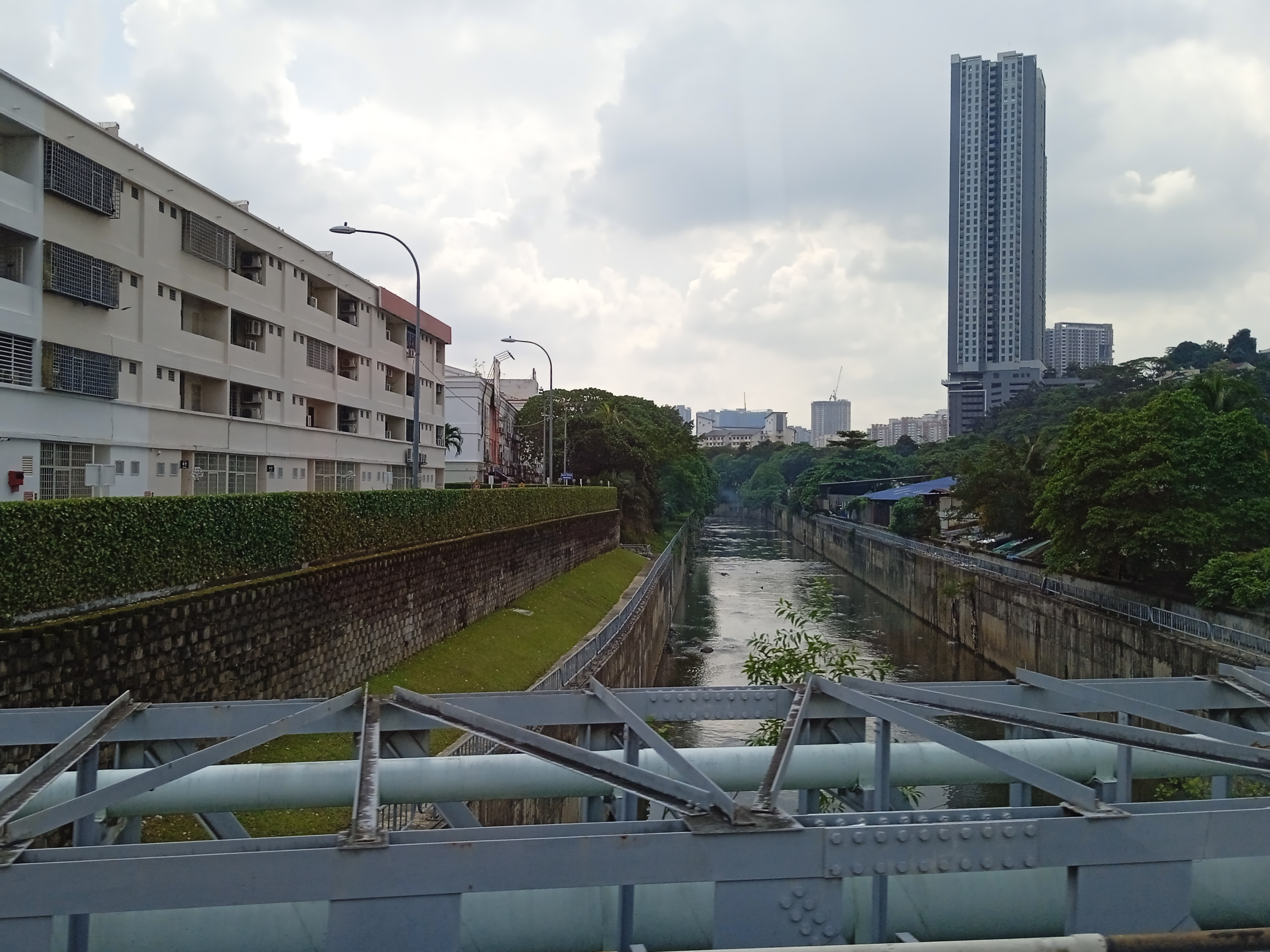
Kerayong River

The Kerayong River is a river in Selangor and Kuala Lumpur, Malaysia. It runs from Kampung Cheras Baru and empties into the Klang River near the Pantai Dalam Komuter station.

Lembangan Sungai Kerayong : Kampung Cheras Baru, Taman Kencana, Taman Maju Jaya, Taman Cheras Indah, Pandan Jaya, Maluri, Miharja, Taman Ikan Emas, Chan Sow Lin, Salak Selatan, Pandai Dalam kampung sungai kerayong kampong sungai kerayong kg. sg. kerayong
