= Cochrane =

Cochrane may refer to:

== Places ==
=== Australia ===
- Cochrane railway station, Sydney, a railway station on the closed Ropes Creek railway line

=== Canada ===
- Cochrane, Alberta
- Cochrane Lake, Alberta
- Cochrane District, Ontario
  - Cochrane, Ontario, a town within the above district
  - Cochrane railway station, the railway station serving Cochrane town
  - Unorganized North Cochrane District, an unorganized area within the above district
  - Unorganized South East Cochrane District
  - Unorganized South West Cochrane District
- Cochrane (electoral district), former Federal electoral district, Ontario
- Cochrane (provincial electoral district), former provincial electoral district in Alberta

=== Chile ===
- Cochrane, Chile
- Cochrane Lake
- Cochrane River

=== Hong Kong ===
- Cochrane Street

=== Malaysia ===
- Jalan Cochrane, Kuala Lumpur, a road in Kuala Lumpur
- Cochrane MRT station, a mass rapid transit station in Kuala Lumpur

=== United States ===
- Cochrane, Wisconsin

== Organization ==
- Cochrane (organisation), a volunteer group formed to review healthcare trials
  - Cochrane Library, a database storing the Cochrane Reviews of biomedical trials

== Other ==
- Cochrane (surname), the origin of the name and list of people
- Clan Cochrane, a Scottish clan
- Cochrane Theatre, in London
- Cochrane Defense, a chess defensive approach
- USS Cochrane (DDG-21), an American destroyer
- Chilean ship Cochrane, various Chilean Navy ships
- Cochrane Shipbuilders, a shipbuilder based in Selby
- Zefram Cochrane, a character from Star Trek

== See also ==
- Cochrane Airport (disambiguation)
- Cochrane High School (disambiguation)
- Cochrane station (disambiguation)
- Cochran (disambiguation)
