= Cochran (disambiguation) =

Cochran is a surname.

Cochran may also refer to:

- Cochran, Arizona
- Cochran, Georgia
- Cochran, Indiana
- Cochran, Tennessee
- Cochran, Texas
- Cochran, Virginia

== See also ==
- Cochran frog (disambiguation)
- Cochrane (disambiguation)
