= Cockrum =

Cockrum may refer to:

== People ==
- Chris Cockrum (born 1986), American racing driver
- Dave Cockrum (1943–2006), American comics artist

== Places ==
- Cockrum, Mississippi, unincorporated community
- Cockrum, Missouri, unincorporated community
- William M. Cockrum House, Indiana, US

== See also ==
- Cockram
