= Cochrane Airport =

Cochrane Airport may refer to:

- Cochrane/Arkayla Springs Airport in Cochrane, Alberta, Canada
- Cochrane Aerodrome in Cochrane, Ontario, Canada
- Cochrane Water Aerodrome in Cochrane, Ontario, Canada
- Cochrane Airfield in Cochrane, Chile

== See also ==
- Cochran Army Airfield
