= Sunway Velocity Mall =

Shopping mall in Cheras, Kuala Lumpur, Malaysia

- 双威伟乐城广场
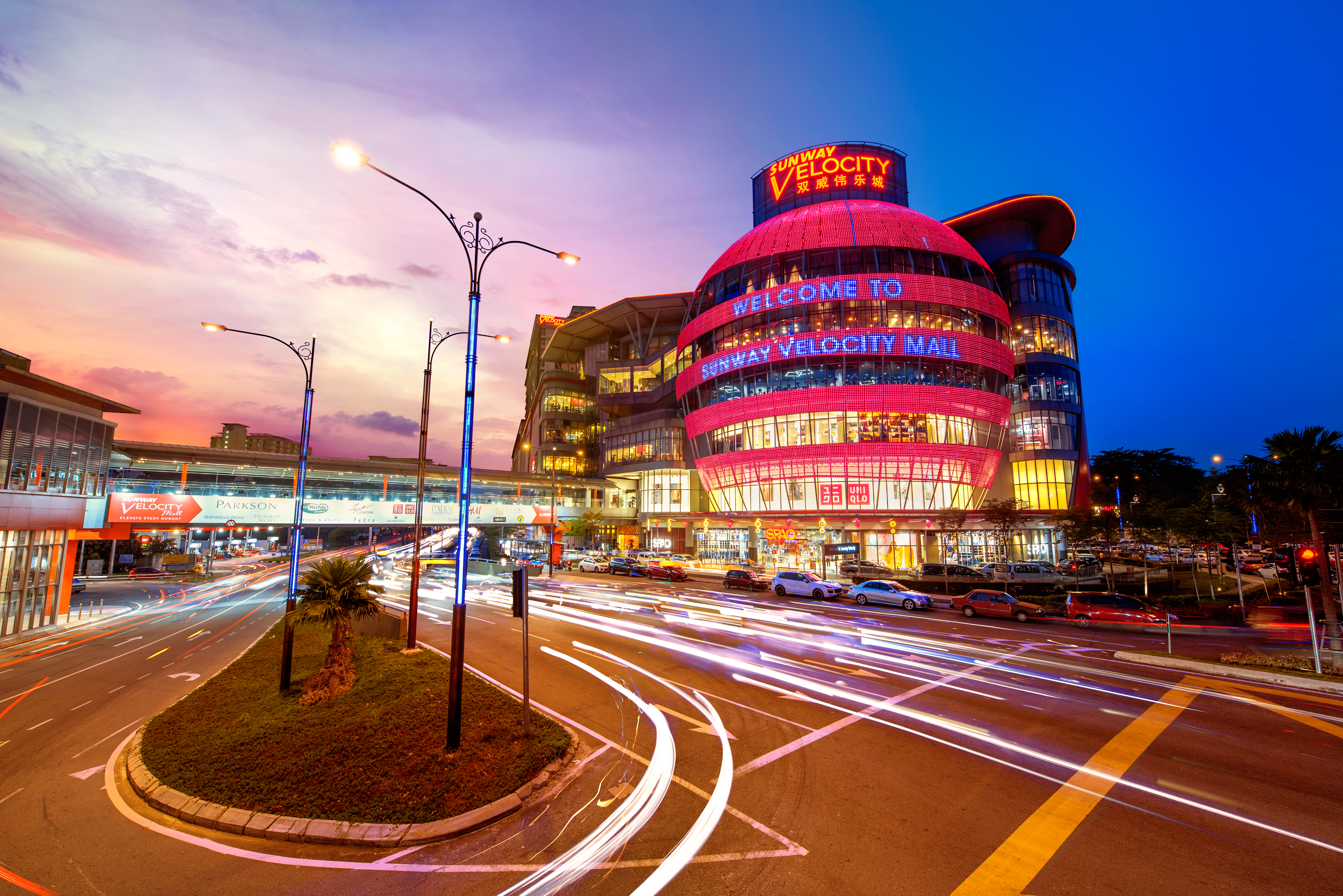
- Location: Cheras, Kuala Lumpur, Malaysia
- Coordinates: 3°7′37.4″N 101°43′29.8″E
- Opened: 8 December 2016; 9 years ago
- Manager: Phang Sau Lian (Senior General Manager)
- Owner: Sunway Group
- Num. of stores: 500
- Num. of anchor tenants: AEON Maxvalu Prime, Parkson, TGV Cinemas IMAX, POPULAR, Toys R Us, KidzB, Koko Block, Hippopo Baby Spa Wellness, Brands Outlet, PADINI Concept Store, H&M, UNIQLO, SPAO, Marks & Spencer, F.O.S, 7DAYZ, Victoria's Secret, HLA Menswear, Superdry, HOOGA, MR.DIY, Harvey Norman, CHI X Fitness, & many more Fun, Fashion, Food, Family, Beauty, Shops
- Floor area: 990,000 sq ft (92,000 m^{2})
- Floors: 9
- Parking: 6,500
- Public transit: Cochrane - elevated walkway Maluri - walking distance
- Website: Official website

Sunway Velocity Mall is a shopping mall in Cheras, Kuala Lumpur, Malaysia owned by Sunway Group.

== History ==
The shopping mall was originally planned to be opened in October 2016. However, it was delayed and finally opened on 8 December that year.

== Tenants ==
The shopping mall houses 500 retail shops, anchor tenants, cinema, fitness center and department store.

== Precincts ==
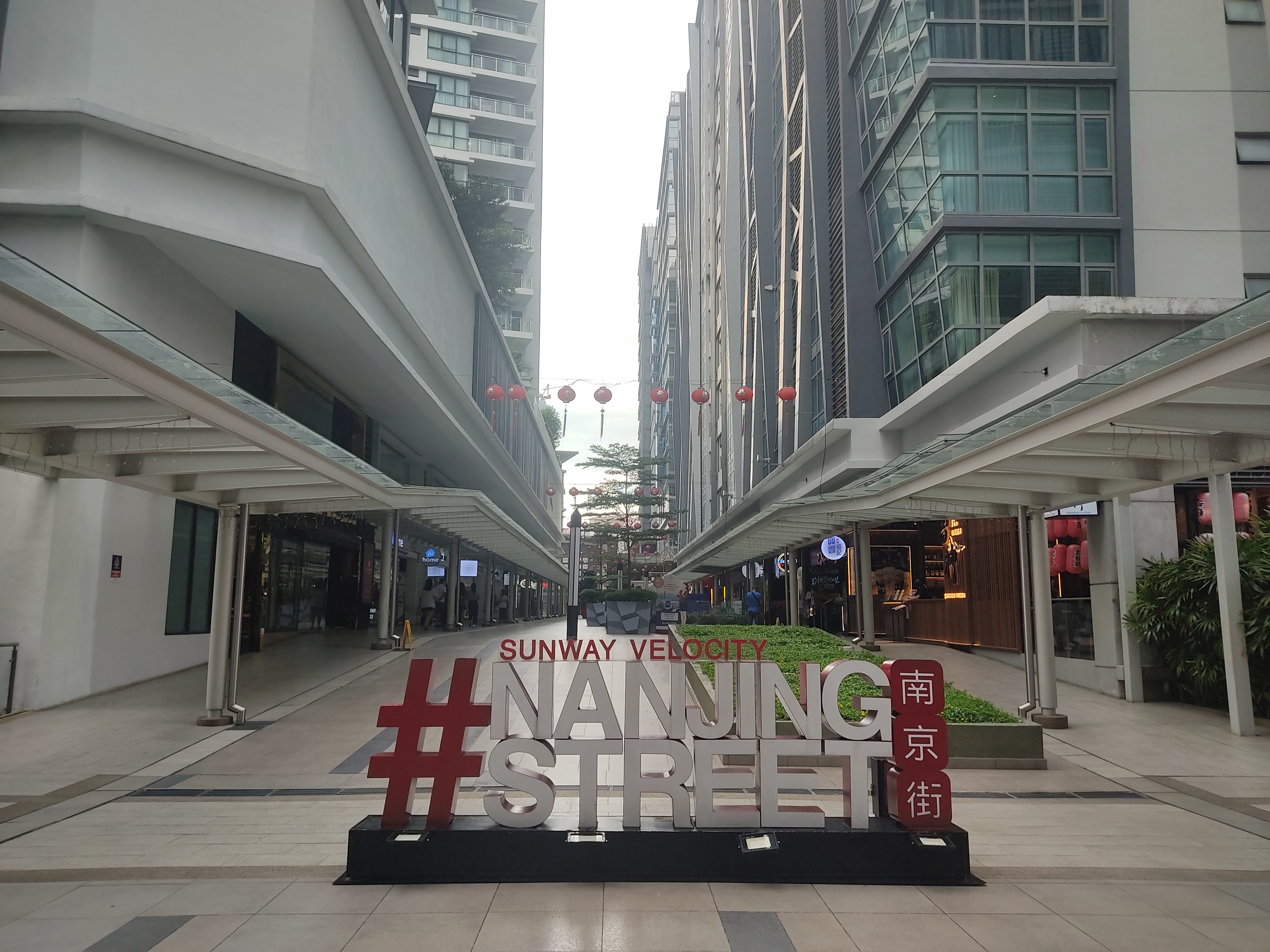
Nanjing street at outdoor space

- Market Place – located at the Basement 1
- Food Street Food – located at Level 4 Centre Court
- Commune – located at Level 5 near the Cinema

== Architecture ==
The shopping mall is a 9-story building with a total floor area of 92,000 m^{2}. The building is connected to the adjacent Sunway Velocity Hotel. It has a gross development value of MYR1.6 billion.

== Transportation ==
The shopping center is accessible via two rapid transit stations. AG13 KG22 Maluri station is connected to Sunway Velocity Mall's Level 1, and KG21 Cochrane MRT station is connected to Sunway Velocity by a 198-metre bridge from Entrance B of the station.

There are 6500 parking bays in its basement parking lot.
