= Cochrane station =

Cochrane station could refer to the following:

- Cochrane MRT station, a rapid transit station in Kuala Lumpur, Malaysia
- Cochrane station (Ontario), a railway station in Cochrane, Ontario, Canada
- Cochrane railway station, Sydney, a disused railway station in Sydney, New South Wales, Australia
