= Cockram =

Cockram is a surname. Notable people with the surname include:

- Alan Cockeram (1894–1957), Canadian mining executive, military officer, and politician
- Allan Cockram (born 1963), English footballer
- Felicity Cockram, Australian film producer
- Henry Cockeram (flourished 1623–1658), English lexicographer

== See also ==
- W W Cockram Stakes, Melbourne Racing Club Group 3 Australian Thoroughbred horse race
- Cochrane (disambiguation)
