= Beehive oven =

Type of oven

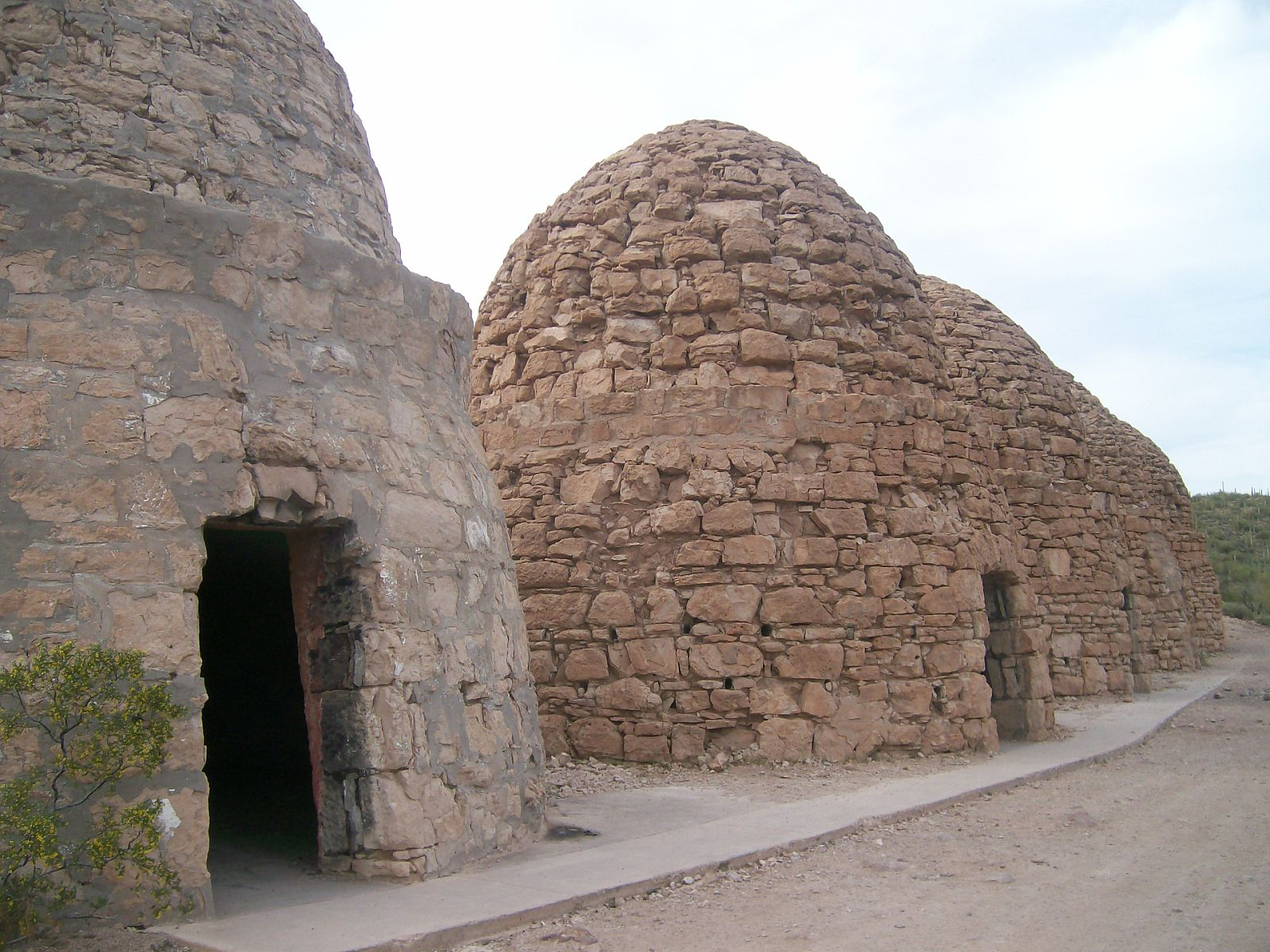
Abandoned beehive coke ovens near the ghost town of Cochran, Arizona

A beehive oven is a type of oven in use since the Middle Ages in Europe. It gets its name from its domed shape, which resembles that of a skep, an old-fashioned type of beehive.

Its apex of popularity occurred in the Americas and Europe all the way until the Industrial Revolution, which saw the advent of gas and electric ovens. Beehive ovens were common in households used for baking pies, cakes and meat. These ovens were also used in industry, in such applications as making tiles and pots and turning coal into coke.

== Construction ==
A fire brick chamber shaped like a dome is used. It is typically 4 metres (13 ft) wide and 2.5 metres (8 ft 2 in) high. The roof has a hole for charging the coal or other kindling from the top. The discharging hole is provided in the circumference of the lower part of the wall. In a coke oven battery, a number of ovens are built in a row with common walls between neighboring ovens. A battery consisted of a great many ovens, sometimes hundreds of ovens, in a row. Some mines also employed parallel batteries.

== Coke manufacture ==
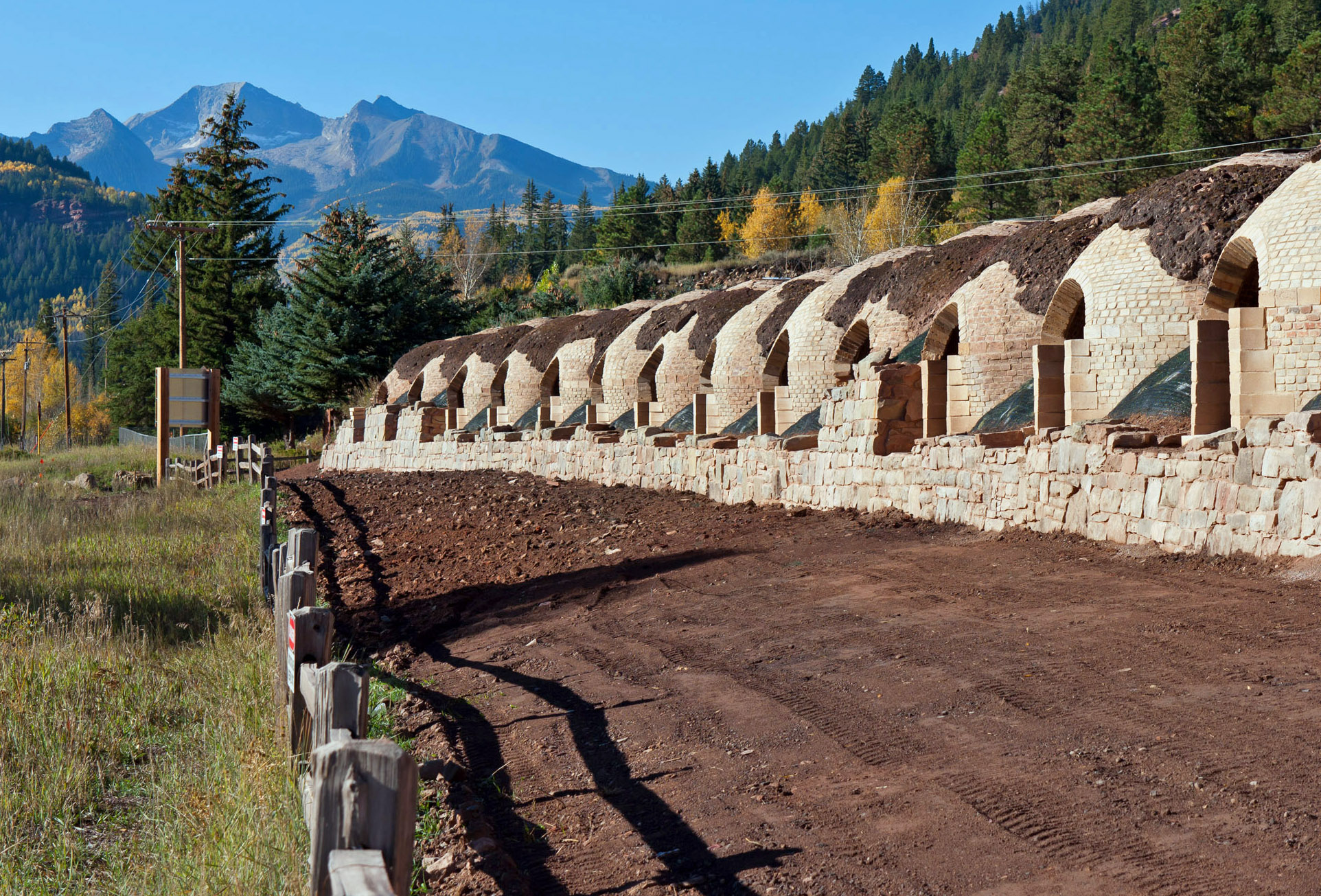
Coke ovens being restored, Redstone, CO

While coal was the premier fuel of the industrial revolution, very few raw coals are suitable for making iron in blast furnaces. However, many coals can be converted to coke, a hard and highly carbonaceous mineral foam well suited for fueling blast furnaces, by distilling off the volatile components. In the early 1900s, in the US alone, there were several thousand beehive coke ovens employed in making coke. These were typically about 3.6 metres (12 ft) diameter, paired back to back in long banks, enclosed behind an oven high retaining wall and well covered with earth. Each bank had a railed track down the center for the car used to charge the ovens. Each bank face had a oven door sill level platform for holding and cooling coke, above a RR track for shipping it.

Beehive coke ovens were batch processors. Given a hot oven, the coking cycle begins by adding coal from the top and leveling it to produce an even layer of about 60–90 centimetres (24–35 in) deep. The door is then bricked up and sealed, leaving only a small air vent. As the surface coal heats, it undergoes destructive distillation, evolving combustible gasses and vapors which soon ignite, providing the heat for ongoing distillation. Heating is regulated by limiting the amount of air entering the door's vent. Excess distillate escapes through the top and burns above the oven, producing spectacular nighttime displays. Distillation proceeds from top to bottom. As the coal heats, it softens into a tarry mass permeated with bubbles of evolving distillate, which give the coke its characteristic cellular structure. Most of the fixed carbon is retained in the coke, while some of the volatile gasses are cracked, depositing their carbon in the upper layer of coke, giving the "top ends" their prized metallic luster. Complete distillation is marked by much reduced gas production, at which point the top hole is covered until the coke can be withdrawn. As the coke is still hot enough to ignite on exposure to air, it is cooled in the oven by introducing water concurrently with unbricking the door. As the oven remains much too hot to enter, the coke is broken up and pulled out with long handled scrapers. Ideally the next cycle starts immediately after pulling the previous charge, to make maximum use of the oven's retained heat.

Cycle time varied with the raw coal's chemical and physical character, particularly the percentage of volatiles, and with the initial depth of a charge, the rate that air is introduced, and promptness of pulling the coke and recharging. Typical cycle time was 48 hours for blast furnace coke, up to 72 hours for special purpose cokes. Uniform size and fineness of the raw coal promoted uniform and more rapid coking, so the feed was usually slack screened from shipping stock, supplemented by crushed stock. Sulfur and phosphorus, the primary contaminating elements, are retained in coking, so it was highly desirable that the coal be "washed" before coking. This usually used density based concentration techniques to eliminate the heavier iron pyrites and slate. Since exposure to the atmosphere reduces the tendency of any coal to coke, coke ovens tended to be built adjacent to the screening plants.

== Cooking food ==
With candle wax wrapped in paper, dry kindling (twigs, small sticks, and/or wood chips), and pine cones, a small fire was made toward the front of the oven. As the fire caught, more kindling was added to produce a thick smoke, which coated the oven with black soot. The fire was then pushed back into the middle of the oven with a hoe. More wood would be added until there was a good, hot fire. After all of these steps were taken, the food would be prepared for baking.

The beehive oven typically took two to three hours to heat, occasionally even four hours in the winter. Breads were baked first when the beehive oven was hottest, with other baked items such as cinnamon buns, cakes, and pies. As the oven cooled, muffins and "biscuits" could be baked, along with puddings and custards. After a day's baking there was typically sufficient heat to dry apples and other fruits, vegetables, or herbs. Pots of beans were often placed in the back of the oven to cook slowly overnight.

== History ==
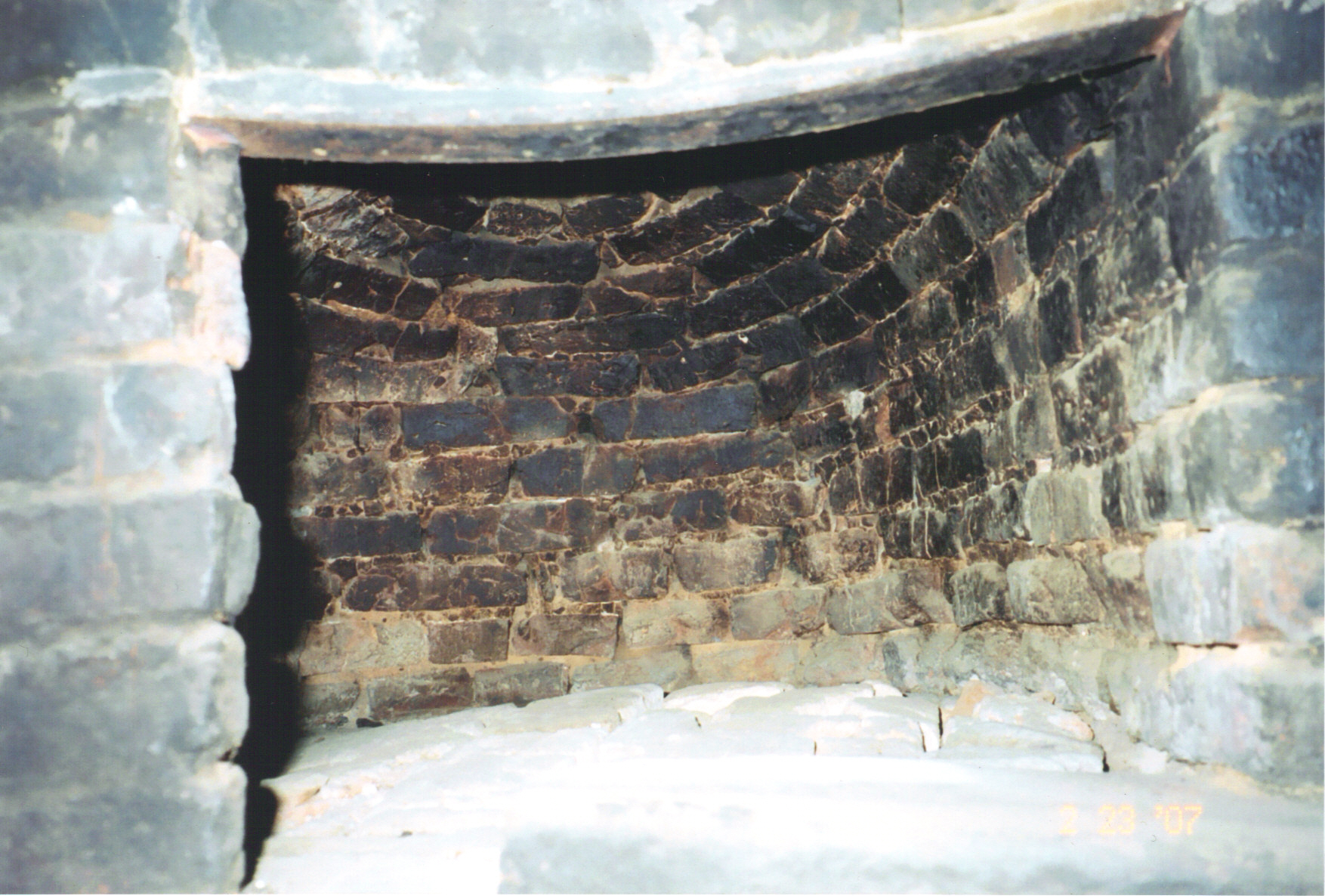
American 17th century beehive oven front Ephraim Hawley House

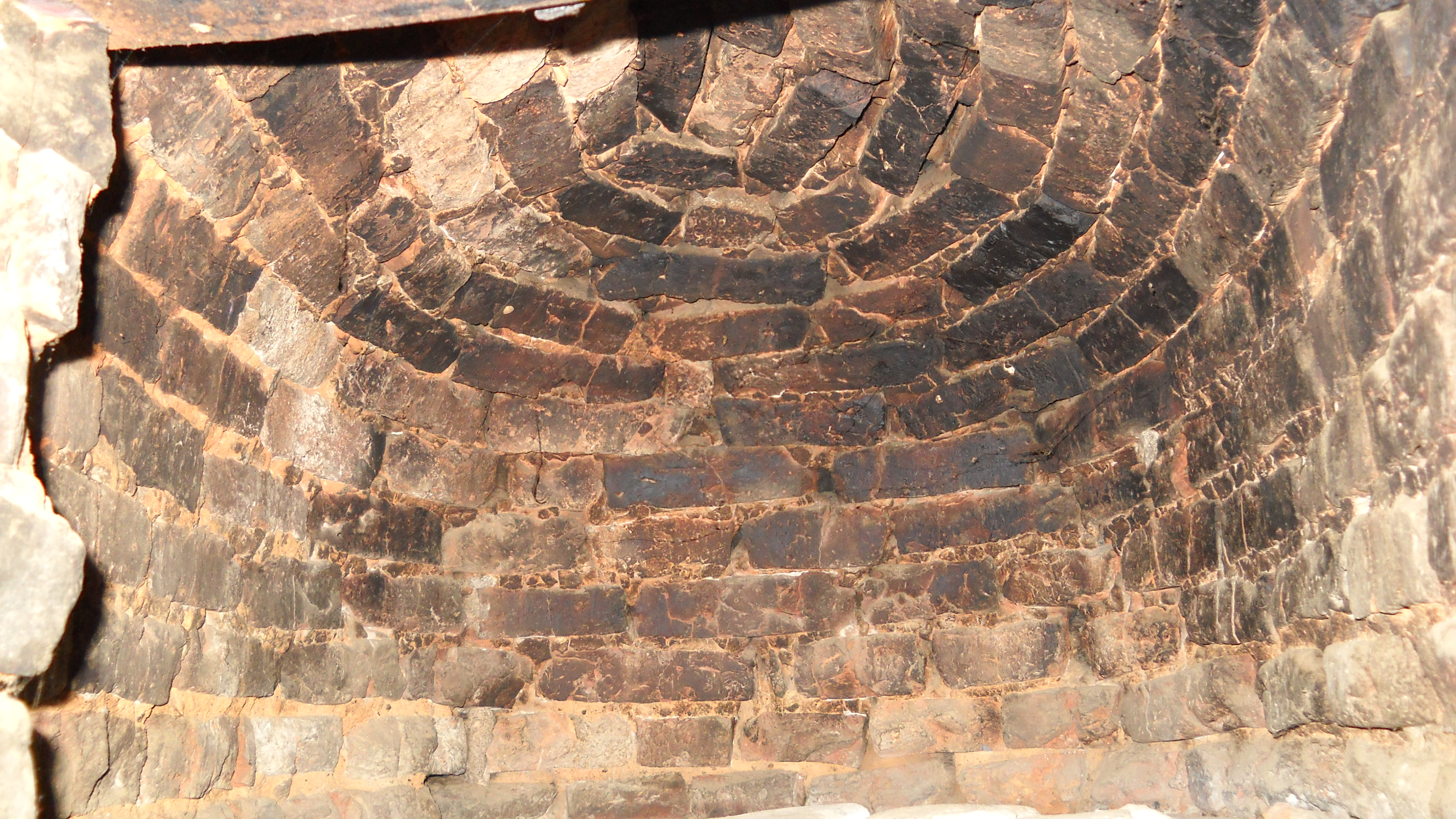
Beehive oven ceiling Ephraim Hawley House

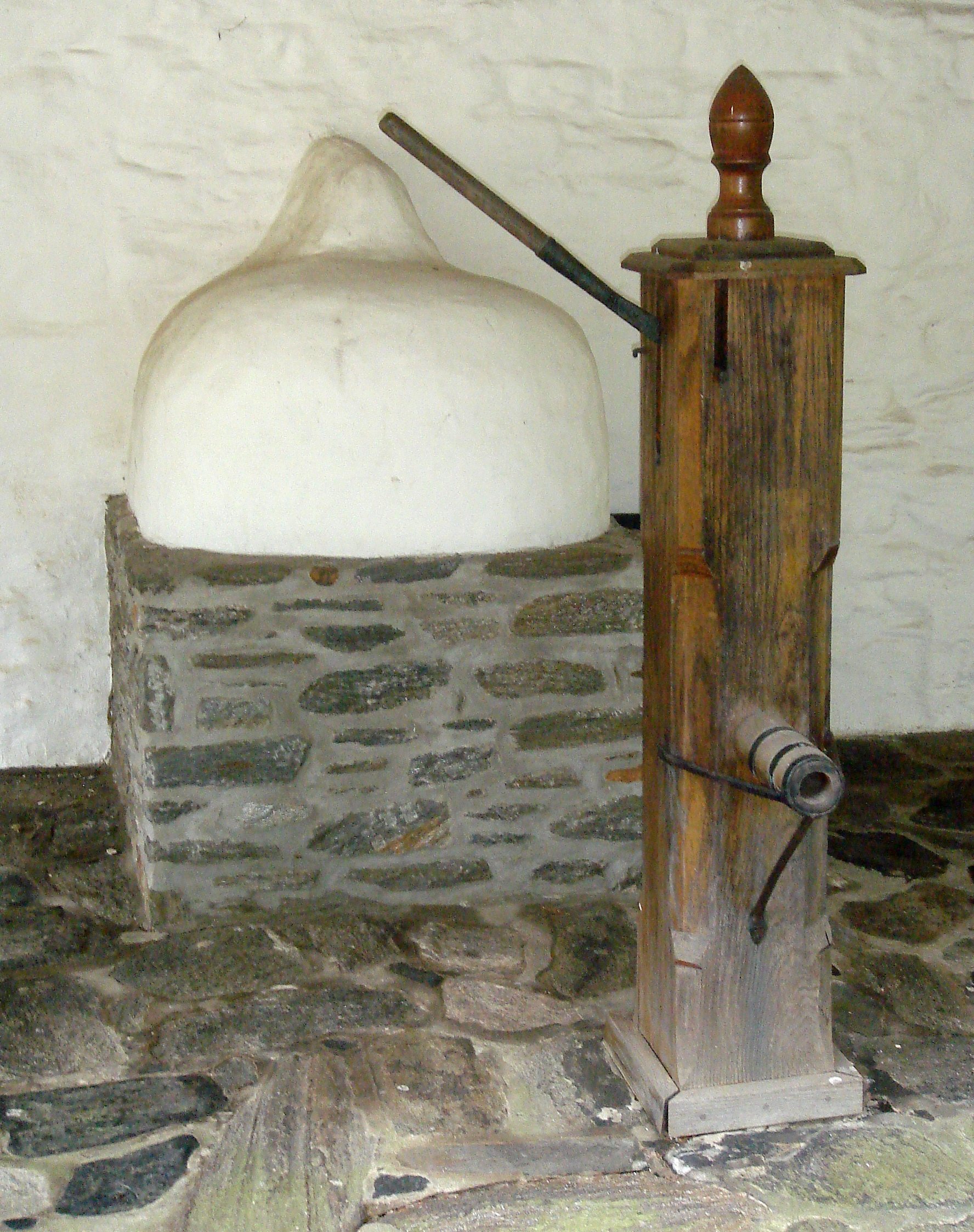
A beehive oven, shown back, next to water pump

In the Thirteen Colonies that later became the United States, most households had a beehive oven. Bread was usually baked in it once a week, often in conjunction with pies, crackers, or other baked goods. To heat the oven, the baker would heap coals and kindling inside and wait several hours. Requiring strict regulation, the right amount of wood to ash had to be burned and then tested by sticking one's hands inside. Then one had to add more wood or open the door to let it cool to the right temperature.

Beehive ovens were also used in iron-making. Before this time, iron-making utilized large quantities of charcoal, produced by burning wood. As forests dwindled dangerously, the substitution of coke for charcoal became common in Great Britain, and the coke was manufactured by burning coal in heaps on the ground in such a way that only the outer layer burned, leaving the interior of the pile in a carbonized state. In the late 19th century, brick beehive ovens were developed, which allowed more control over the burning process.

The number of beehive ovens between 1870 and 1905 skyrocketed from about 200 to almost 31,000, which produced nearly 18 million tons of coke in the Pittsburgh area alone. One observer boasted that, loaded into a train, "the year's production would make up a train so long that the engine in front of it would go to San Francisco and come back to Connellsville before the caboose had gotten started out of the Connellsville yards!" The number of beehive ovens in the Pittsburgh seam peaked in 1910 at almost 48,000.

Although they made a top-quality fuel, beehive ovens poisoned the surrounding landscape. After 1900, the serious environmental damage of beehive coking attracted national notice, even though the damage had plagued the district for decades. "The smoke and gas from some ovens destroy all vegetation around the small mining communities," noted W. J. Lauck of the U.S. Immigration Commission in 1911. Passing through the region on train, University of Wisconsin president Charles van Hise saw "long rows of beehive ovens from which flame is bursting and dense clouds of smoke issuing, making the sky dark. By night the scene is rendered indescribably vivid by these numerous burning pits. The beehive ovens make the entire region of coke manufacture one of dulled sky, cheerless and unhealthful".

In China, beehive ovens were not banned until 1996, and this ban was not fully effective until 2011.
