= Cochrane Airfield =

Cochrane Airport
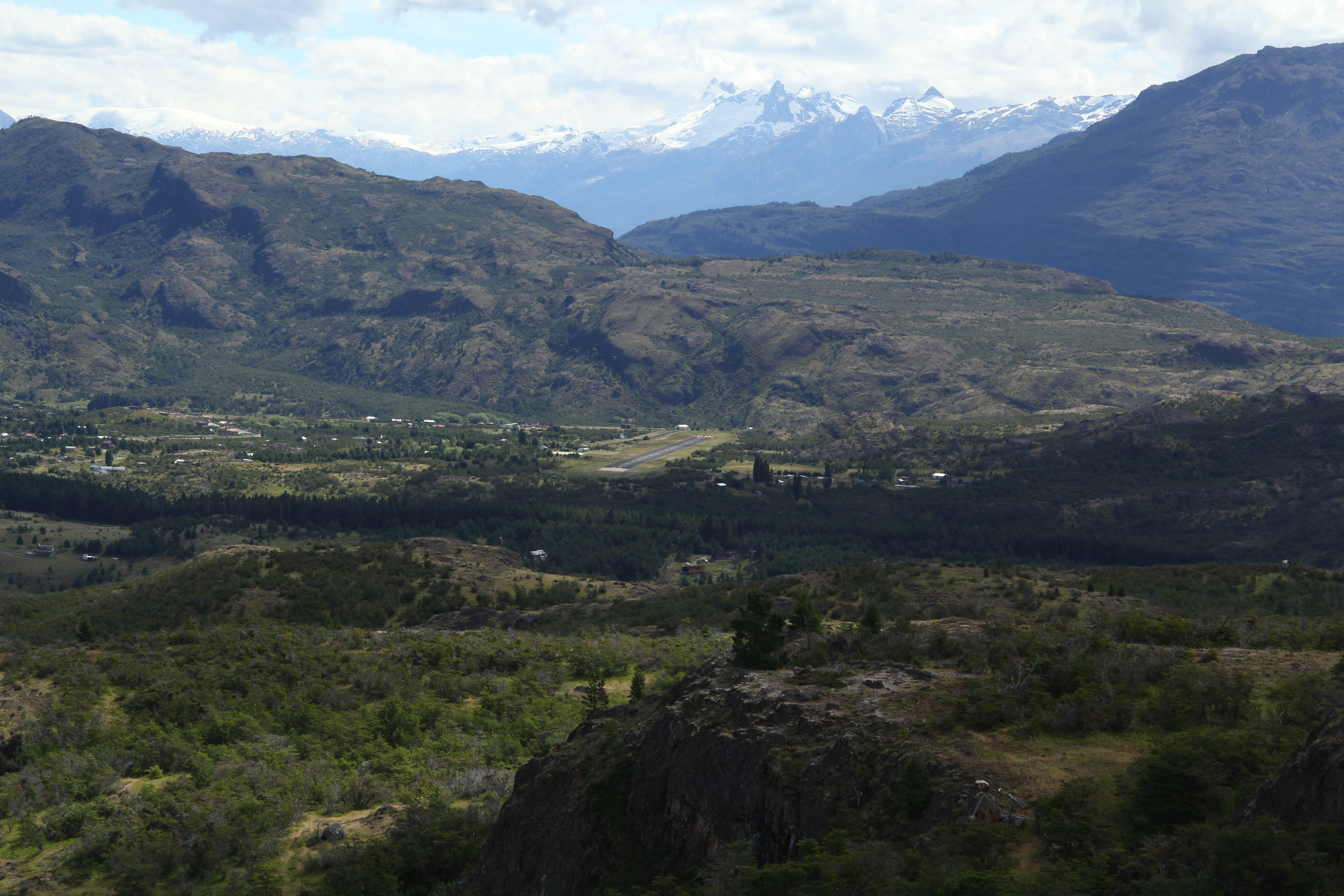
- IATA: LGR; ICAO: SCHR

Summary
- Airport type: Public
- Serves: Cochrane, Chile
- Elevation AMSL: 643 ft / 196 m
- Coordinates: 47°14′36″S 72°35′10″W

Map
- Location in Chile

Runways
| Direction | Length | | Surface |
| Direction | m | ft | Surface |
|---|---|---|---|
| 07/25 | 1,060 | 3,478 | Asphalt |
- Source: AIP Chile Landings.com Google Maps GCM

Cochrane Airport Spanish: Aeródromo Cochrane, (IATA: LGR, ICAO: SCHR) is an airport serving Cochrane, a town in the Aysén Region of Chile. The airport is just northwest of the town, at the foot of Cerro Tamanguito (sv).

The region around Cochrane is mountainous. There are ravines off either end of the runway, with rising terrain beyond.

== See also ==
- Transport in Chile
- List of airports in Chile
