= Chilean ship Cochrane =

Several ships of the Chilean Navy have been named Cochrane or Almirante Cochrane after Thomas Cochrane (1775–1860), commander of the Chilean Navy during that country's war of independence against Spain

- Chilean ironclad Almirante Cochrane, lead ship of her class of battery ships, launched in 1874, and scrapped in 1933
- ordered as Chilean battleship Almirante Cochrane, a dreadnought battleship laid down in Britain in 1913, but acquired unfinished by the Royal Navy in 1917, and converted to the carrier HMS Eagle
- Chilean destroyer Cochrane, a Fletcher-class destroyer, the former USS Rooks (DD-804), commissioned into the Chilean Navy in 1962, and scrapped in 1983
- Chilean destroyer Almirante Cochrane (1967), a County-class destroyer, the former HMS Antrim (D18), acquired by the Chilean Navy in 1984, and decommissioned in 2006
- Chilean frigate Almirante Cochrane (FF-05), a Type 23 frigate, the former HMS Norfolk (F230), commissioned into the Chilean Navy in 2006
