= Cochrane High School =

Cochrane High School may refer to:

- Cochrane High School (Cochrane, Alberta), Cochrane, Alberta
- Cochrane High School (Regina, Saskatchewan), Regina, Saskatchewan
