= Cochran, Arizona =

Ghost town in Pinal County

- Ghost town
- Location within Arizona Location within the United States
- Coordinates: 33°06′34″N 111°08′59″W
- Country: United States
- State: Arizona
- County: Pinal
- Founded: 1905
- Abandoned: 1915
- Named for: John S. Cochran, first postmaster
- Elevation: 1,600 ft (500 m)

Population (2009)
  - Total: 0
- Time zone: UTC-7 (MST (no DST))
- Post Office opened: January 3, 1905
- Post Office closed: January 15, 1915

Cochran is a ghost town in Pinal County in the U.S. state of Arizona. The town was settled in 1905, in what was then the Arizona Territory.

== History ==
Named after its first postmaster, John S. Cochran, the small mining camp also served as a stop on the Santa Fe, Prescott and Phoenix Railway (now the Copper Basin Railway). The post office was established on January 3, 1905, and was discontinued on January 15, 1915. At its peak, the population was approximately 100, and housed a general store and a boardinghouse, among other establishments.

Apart from a few building foundations in the town center, and the railroad tracks at the edge of the now-abandoned town site, Cochran's last (and most notable) remains are five largely intact beehive coke ovens across the Gila River at Butte, Arizona. (These coke ovens are actually from an earlier town that existed before Cochrane came into existence.)

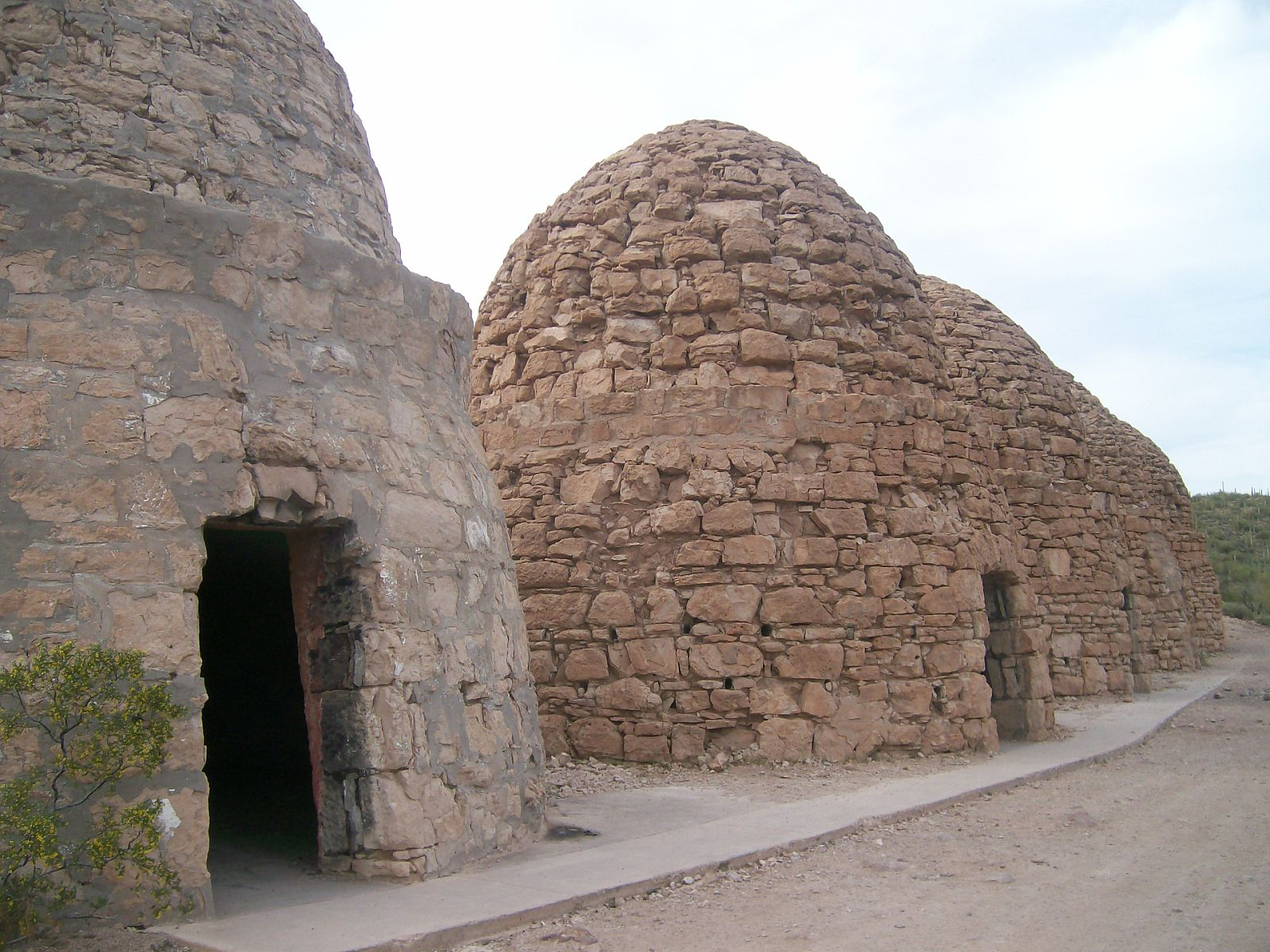
Coke Ovens near Butte, Arizona

The Coke Ovens are on a 189-acre section of private property; visitation is not allowed.

== Geography ==
Cochran is located about 15 miles (24 km) east of Florence, Arizona at 33°06′34″N 111°08′59″W.
