= Cochrane MRT station =

MRT station in Kuala Lumpur, Malaysia

KG21 Cochrane
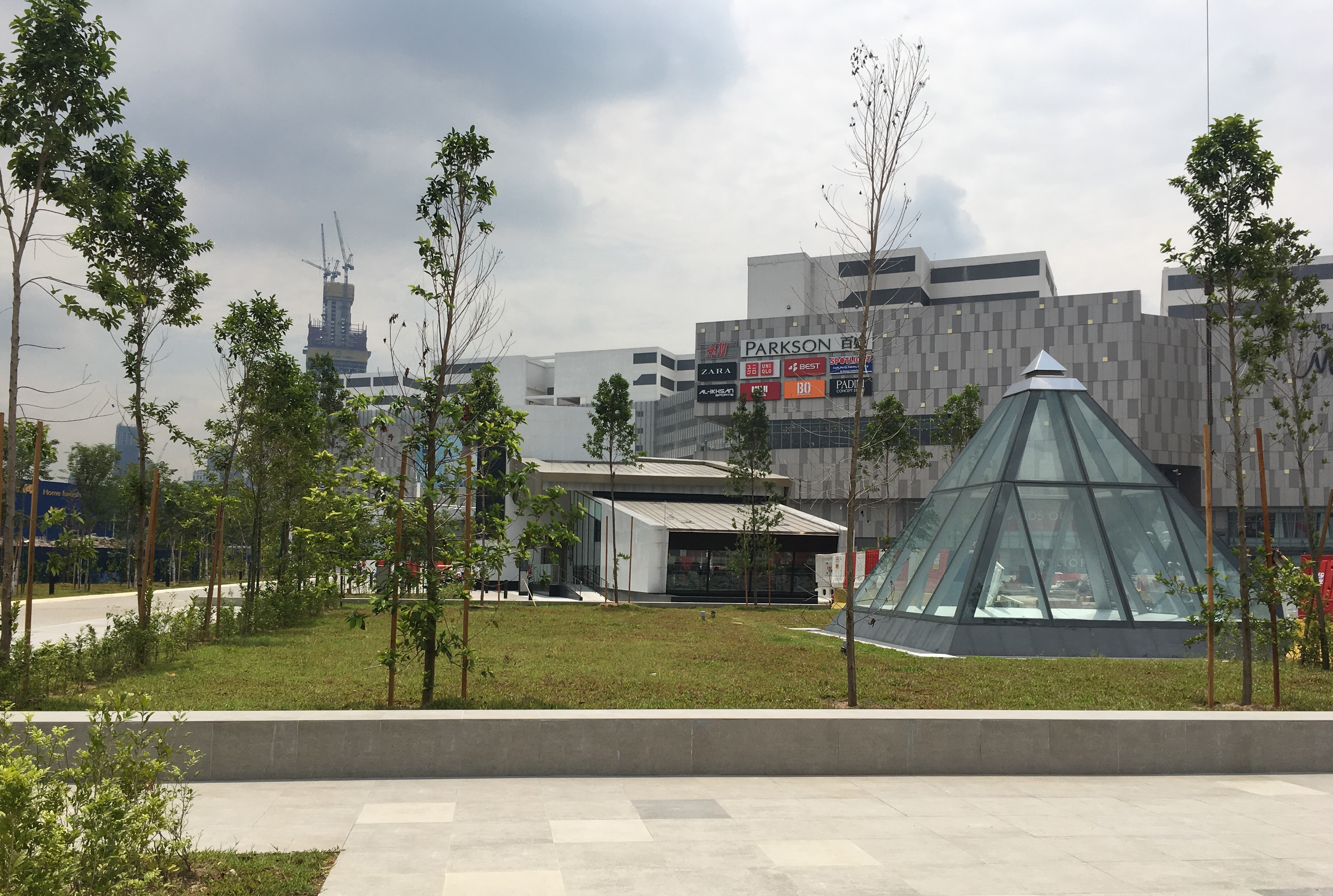
- Entrance to the underground station

General information
- Other names: Malay: كوكرين (Jawi); Chinese: 葛京; Tamil: காக்ரேன்
- Location: Jalan Cochrane, Taman Maluri; 55100 Kuala Lumpur; Malaysia
- Coordinates: 3°12′23″N 101°34′49″E
- System: Rapid KL
- Owner: MRT Corp
- Operator: Rapid Rail
- Line: 9 Kajang Line
- Platforms: 1 island platform
- Tracks: 2

Construction
- Structure type: Underground
- Depth: 32 metres (105 ft)
- Platform levels: 1
- Parking: Not available
- Cycle facilities: Not available
- Accessible: Yes

Other information
- Station code: KG21

History
- Opened: 17 July 2017; 9 years ago

Services
| Preceding station | | Following station |
|---|---|---|
| Tun Razak Exchange towards Kwasa Damansara | Kajang Line | Maluri towards Kajang |
Location

The Cochrane MRT station is a mass rapid transit (MRT) underground station in Kuala Lumpur, Malaysia, on the MRT Kajang Line. It was opened on 17 July 2017, as part of second phase operations of the line.

The station is located in the Cheras area of Kuala Lumpur, adjacent to Jalan Cochrane, Jalan Peel and Shelley Road. It is near two large shopping complexes, the MyTown Shopping Centre (housing Malaysia's second IKEA store) and Sunway Velocity Mall, with the former being connected to the station via an underground pedestrian linkway and the latter via an elevated pedestrian bridge.

The station's location is part of an area previously occupied by quarters housing government servants.

== Station layout ==
The station has four underground levels, with three accessible to the public, namely the Upper Concourse Level, Lower Concourse Level and the Platform Level. One level housing the plant rooms is located between the Upper and Lower Concourse Levels, and is not accessible to the public. The ground level above the station is an open plaza with the station's two entrance buildings cum ventilation shafts, as well as a skylight with a distinctive glass pyramid.

The theme chosen for the interior design of the station was "Urban Living" in recognition of the role the station will play in the redevelopment of the area.

The following is the layout of the station:

| G | Street level | Entrances A and B, taxi and E-hailing layby, feeder bus hub, MyTown Shopping Centre, IKEA Cheras, pedestrian overhead bridge to Sunway Velocity |
| B1 | Upper Concourse | Underground pedestrian linkway to MyTown Shopping Centre B1 level |
| B3 | Lower Concourse | MRT Station Control, MRT customer service office, ticketing machines, fare gates, Entrance C |
| B4 | Platform level | Platform 1: 9 Kajang Line towards KG35 Kajang (→) |
| B4 | Platform level | Island platform, doors will open on the right |
| B4 | Platform level | Platform 2: 9 Kajang Line towards KG04 Kwasa Damansara (←) |

=== Exits and entrances ===
The station has two entrances. Entrance A is located at Jalan Cochrane, and Entrance B is located at Jalan Shelley. There is also an entrance at the Upper Concourse Level in between the escalators to each of the ground entrances and directly under the glass pyramid skylight, which links to the MyTown Shopping Centre and IKEA Cheras. A pedestrian overhead bridge leads to Sunway Velocity Mall, which is accessible via Entrance B. Feeder buses serve the feeder bus hub located at Entrance A.

Kajang Line station
| Entrance | Location | Destination | Picture |
| A | Jalan Cochrane | Feeder bus hub, taxi and E-hailing layby, Jalan Cochrane, MyTown Shopping Centre (across Jalan Cochrane) | |
| B | Jalan Shelley | Jalan Peel, Sunway Velocity Mall (via elevated pedestrian bridge), Church of Sacred Heart, St. John Ambulance of Malaysia Headquarters | |
| MyTown Linkway | Beneath Jalan Cochrane, Upper Level Concourse | MyTown Shopping Centre (B1 Floor), IKEA Cheras | |
| Sunway Velocity Linkway | Jalan Shelley, Jalan Peel | Sunway Velocity Mall (1st floor) (accessible via Entrance B) | |

== History ==
The MRT station is named after Jalan Cochrane, which in turn is named after Charles Walter Hamilton Cochrane (1876–1932), the 17th British resident of Perak and the chief secretary to the Government of the Federated Malay States from 1929 to 1930.

The station is partly located on the site of the former Cochrane Road government quarters. The quarters were demolished in 2010, and the area was earmarked for redevelopment. The MRT station was to become one of the catalysts for this redevelopment process, and in recognition of this role, the "Urban Living" theme for the interior design of the station was chosen.

== Bus services ==
=== MRT feeder bus services ===
With the opening of the MRT Kajang Line, feeder buses also began operating, linking the station with several housing and commercial areas around Bandar Tun Razak, Hospital Canselor Tuanku Muhriz UKM (HCTM), Bandar Sri Permaisuri, Taman Midah, Taman Shamelin Perkasa and Pandan Perdana. These buses operate from the station's feeder bus hub at Entrance A (opposite MyTown Shopping Centre).

The same feeder bus lines also serve the Maluri MRT and LRT station, but only act as a pass-by.

The T400 feeder bus route serves almost the same alignment as T402, which originates from Taman Midah station.

| Route no. | Origin | Destination | Via |
|---|---|---|---|
| T352 | Taman Shamelin Perkasa | KG21 Cochrane | Jalan Perdana Utama; Pandan Perdana; Jalan Indah; Taman Cheras Indah; Sungai Besi Expressway (Pandan Indah Link); AG14 Pandan Jaya; PGRM Building; Jalan Cheras; AG13 KG22 Maluri; Jalan Shelley; Jalan Cochrane; Jalan Tun Razak |
| T400 | KG21 Cochrane | Bandar Tun Razak | Jalan Tun Razak; Jalan Cheras; AG13 KG22 Maluri; FT 1 Cheras Highway (Jalan Cheras); Cheras Badminton Stadium; Jalan Yaacob Latif; Hospital Canselor Tuanku Muhriz UKM (HCTM); Taman Midah; Bandar Tun Razak; Jalan Budiman; Jalan Shelley |
| T401 | KG21 Cochrane | Bandar Sri Permaisuri | Jalan Tun Razak; Jalan Cheras; AG13 KG22 Maluri; Cheras Badminton Stadium; Sri Sabah Flats; Jalan Ikan Emas; Jalan Sekilau; Sri Melaka Flats; Taman Sri Permaisuri; Bandar Sri Permaisuri; Jalan Jellawat 1 SP12 Cheras; Jalan Shelley |

=== Other bus services ===
The MRT station also provides accessibility for some other bus services. The Go KL City Bus Grey Line is another bus route that terminates in the station, provided by the Kuala Lumpur City Hall (DBKL).

| Route no. | Operator | Origin | Destination | Via |
|---|---|---|---|---|
| 420 | Rapid KL | Menara Maybank ( AG7 SP7 KJ13 Masjid Jamek) | Pandan Indah | Jalan Pudu ( AG10 SP10 Pudu); Jalan Pasar; Jalan Cochrane; KG21 Cochrane / MyTown Shopping Centre; Jalan Perkasa 1 Pandan Jaya Flats; Pandan Perdana Flats; Taman Kencana; Pandan Indah; MPAJ Building; AG16 Cempaka |

== Gallery ==
=== Station ===
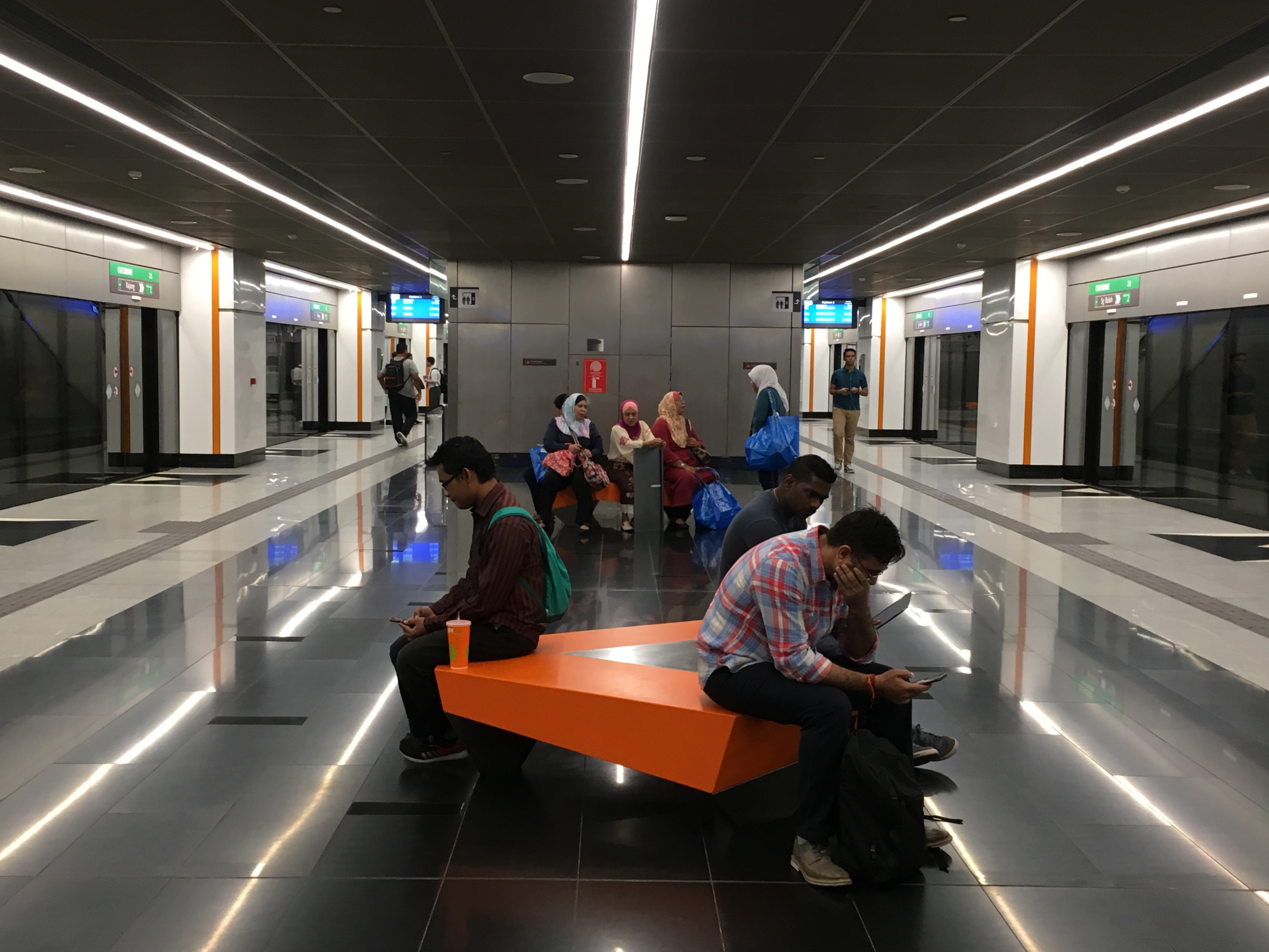
Platform level of the station with its distinctive bench design

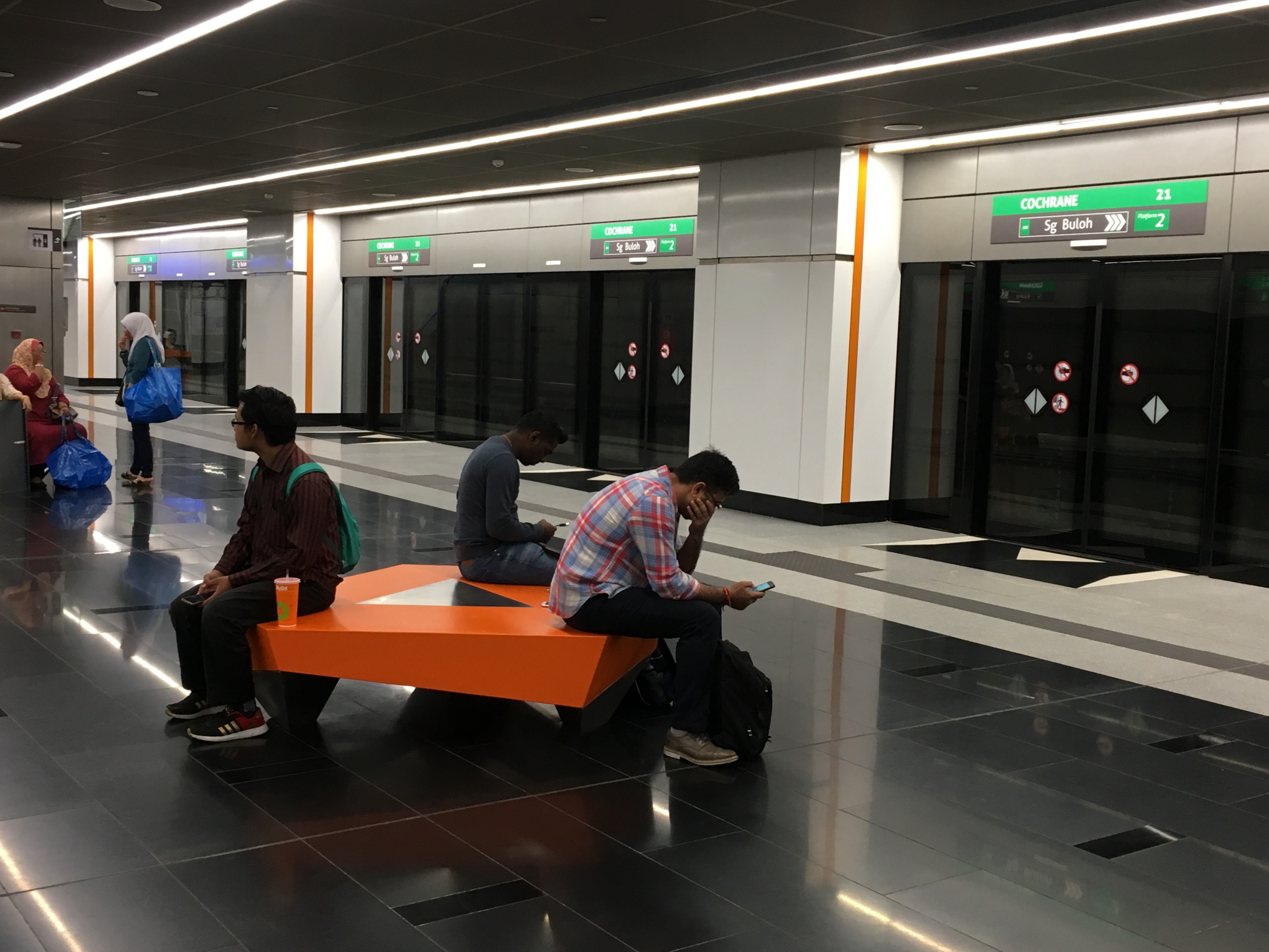
Platform level of the station

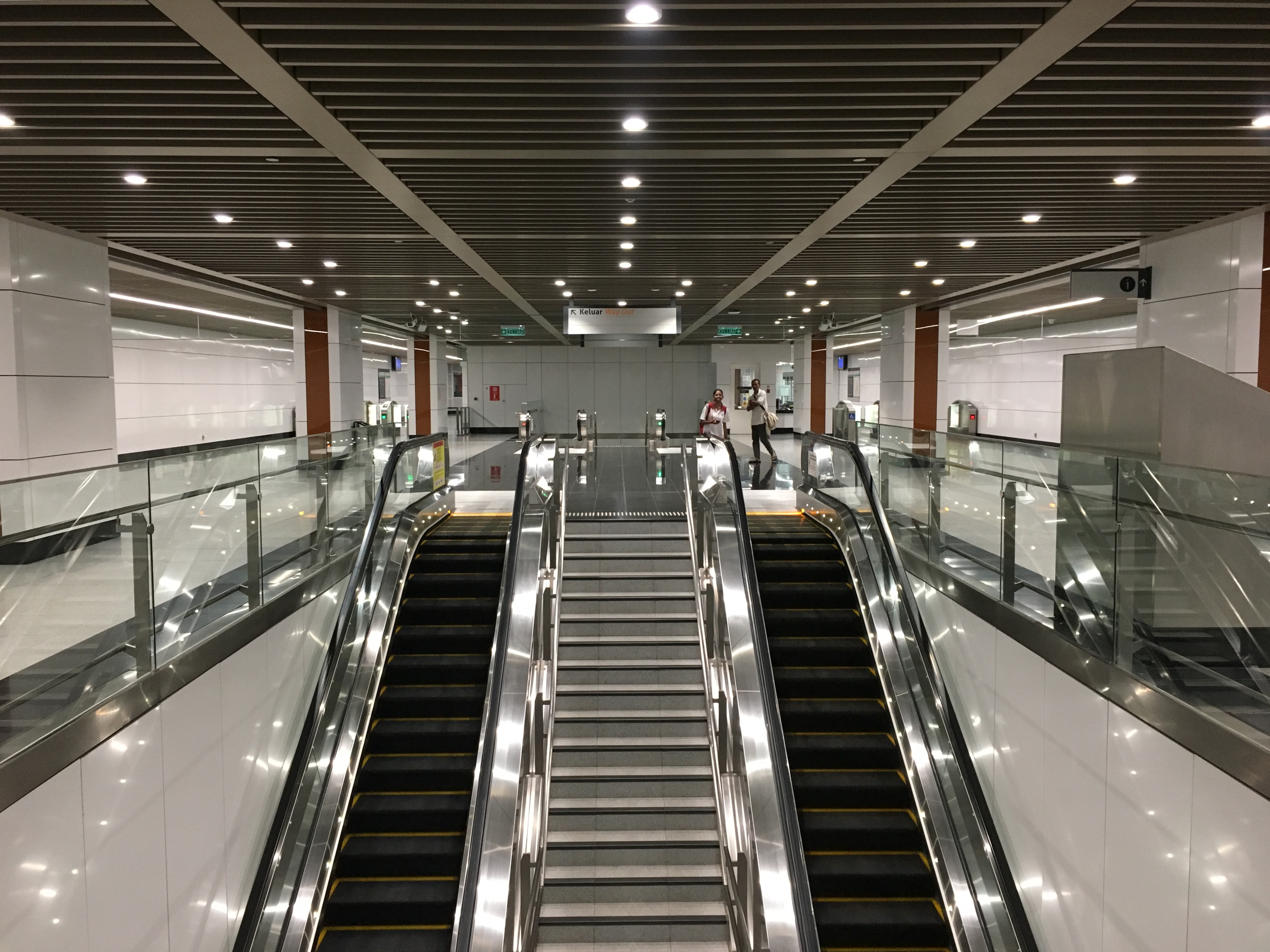
Escalators at the Lower Concourse level of the station

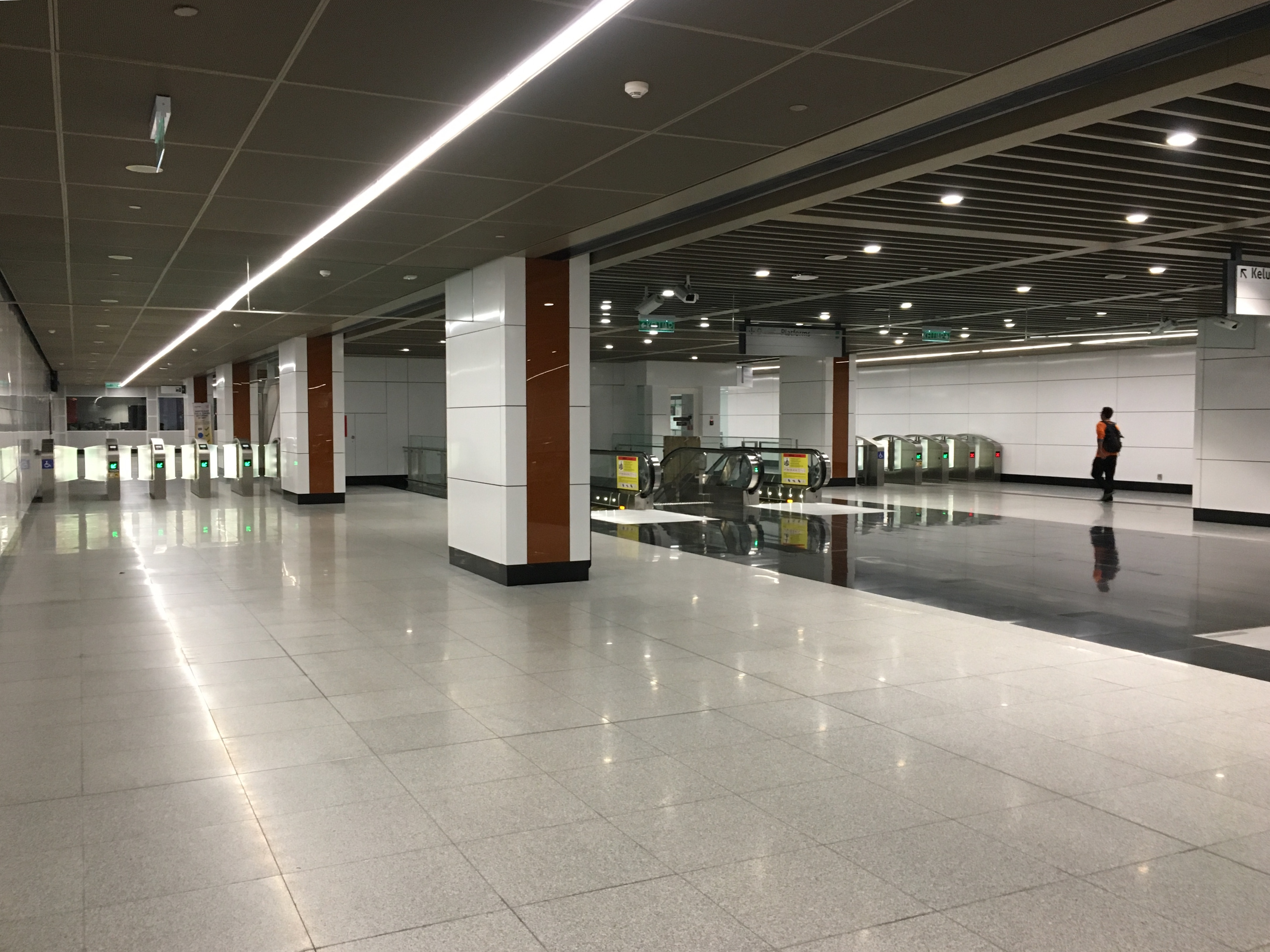
Lower Concourse level of the station where the fare gates are located

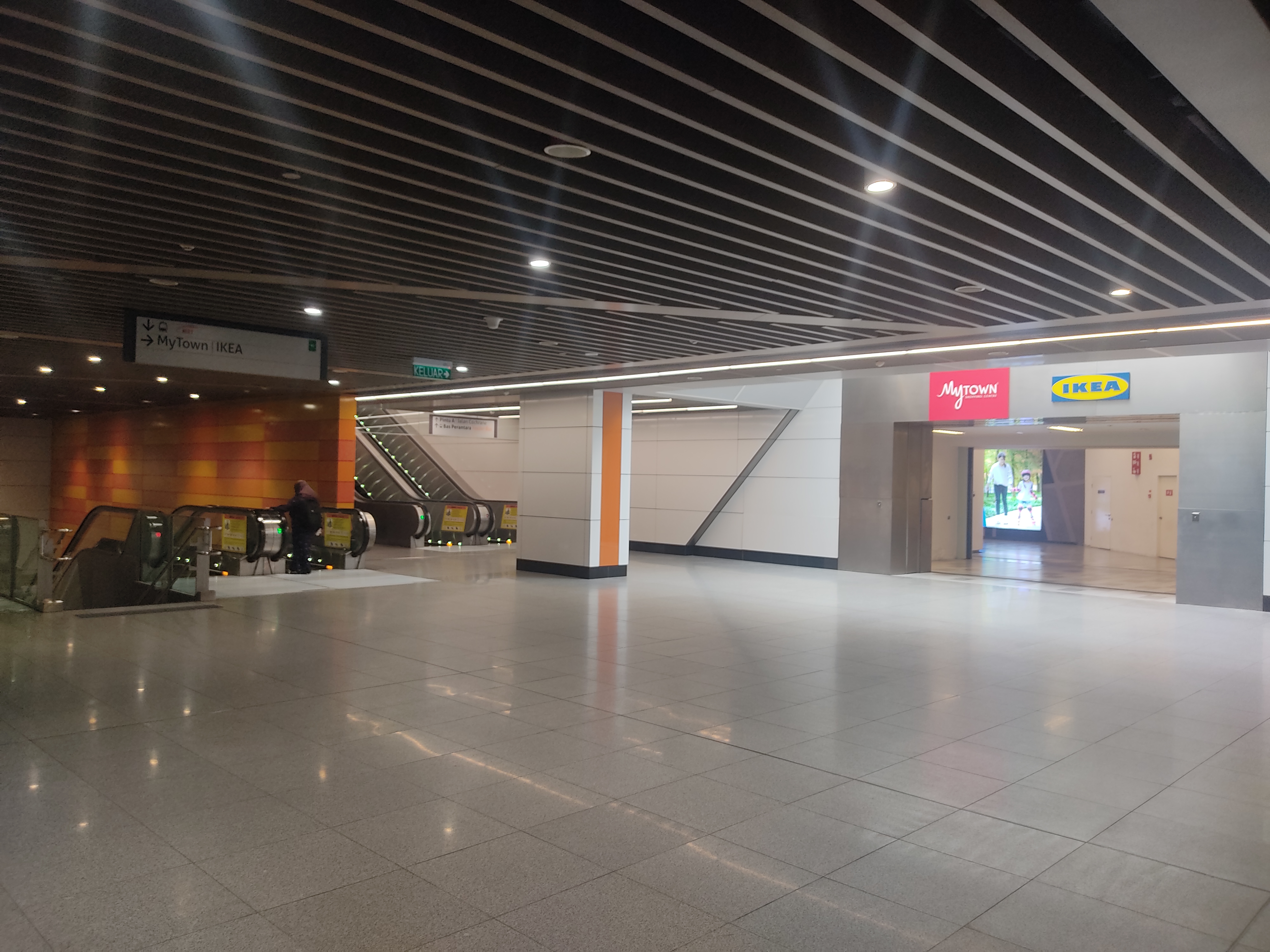
Upper Concourse level, showing the entrance to the underground pedestrian linkway to MyTown Shopping Centre

=== MyTown linkway ===
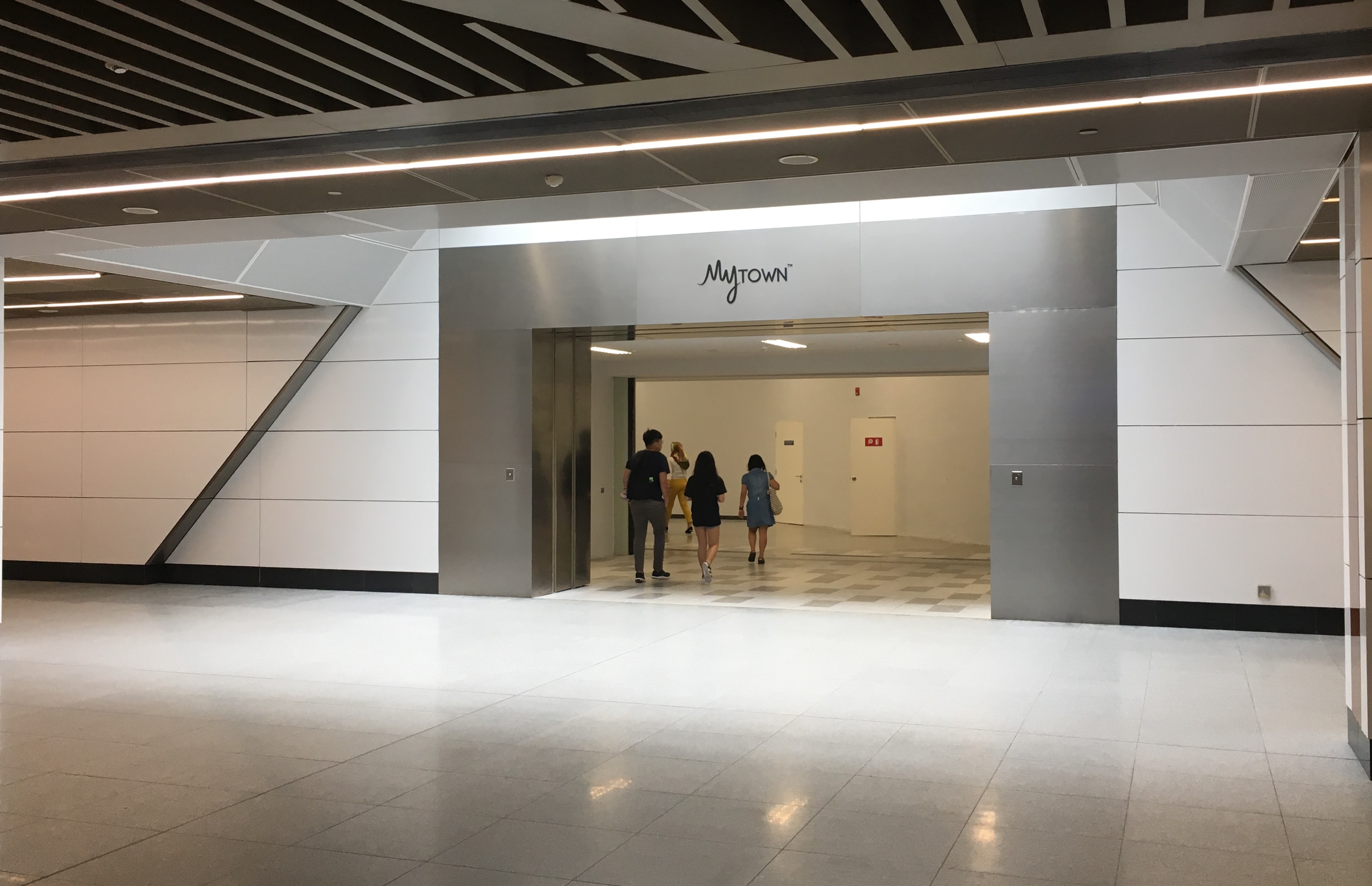
Entrance to the underground pedestrian linkway to MyTown Shopping Centre at the Upper Concourse level of the station

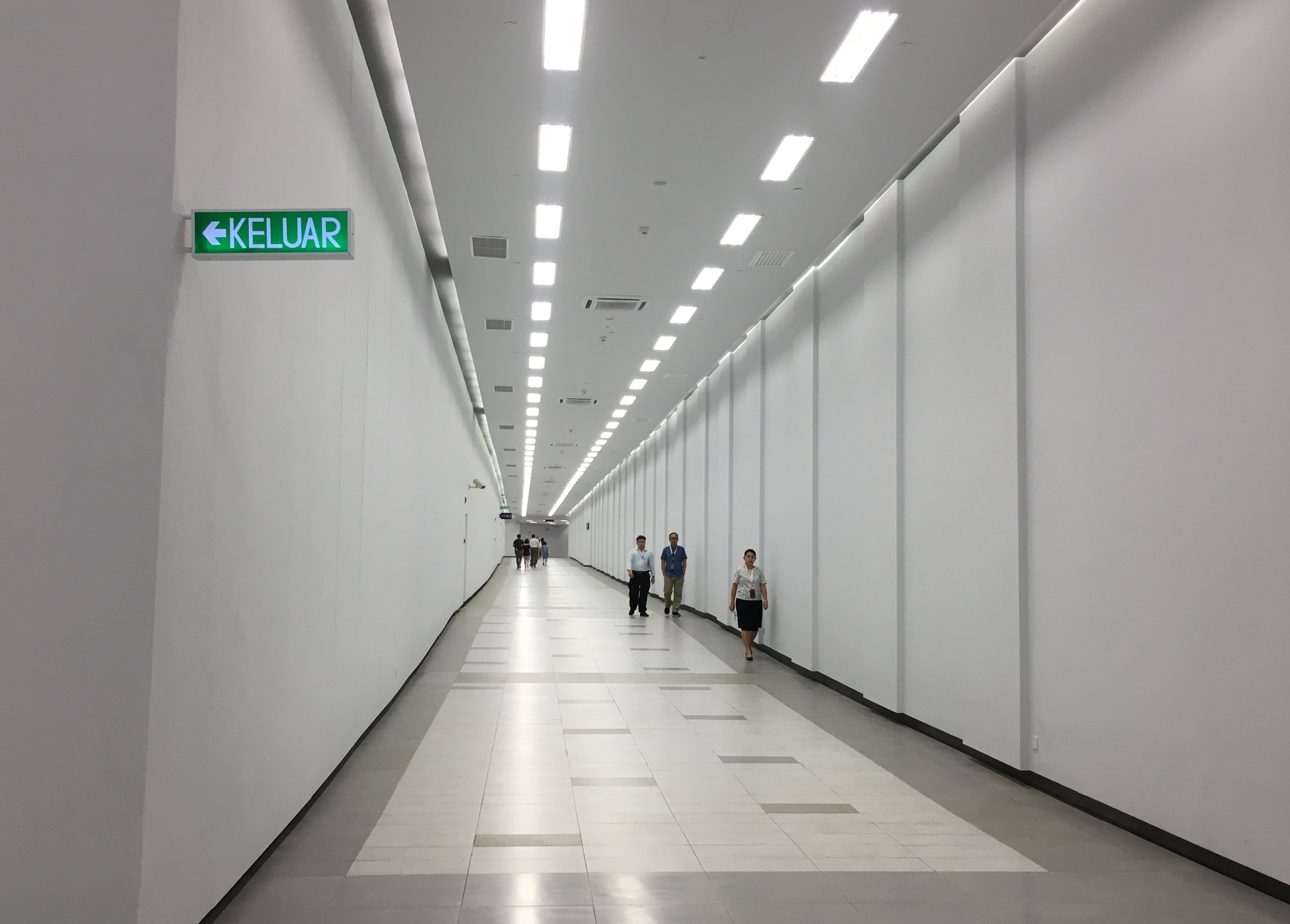
View of the linkway towards MyTown Shopping Centre

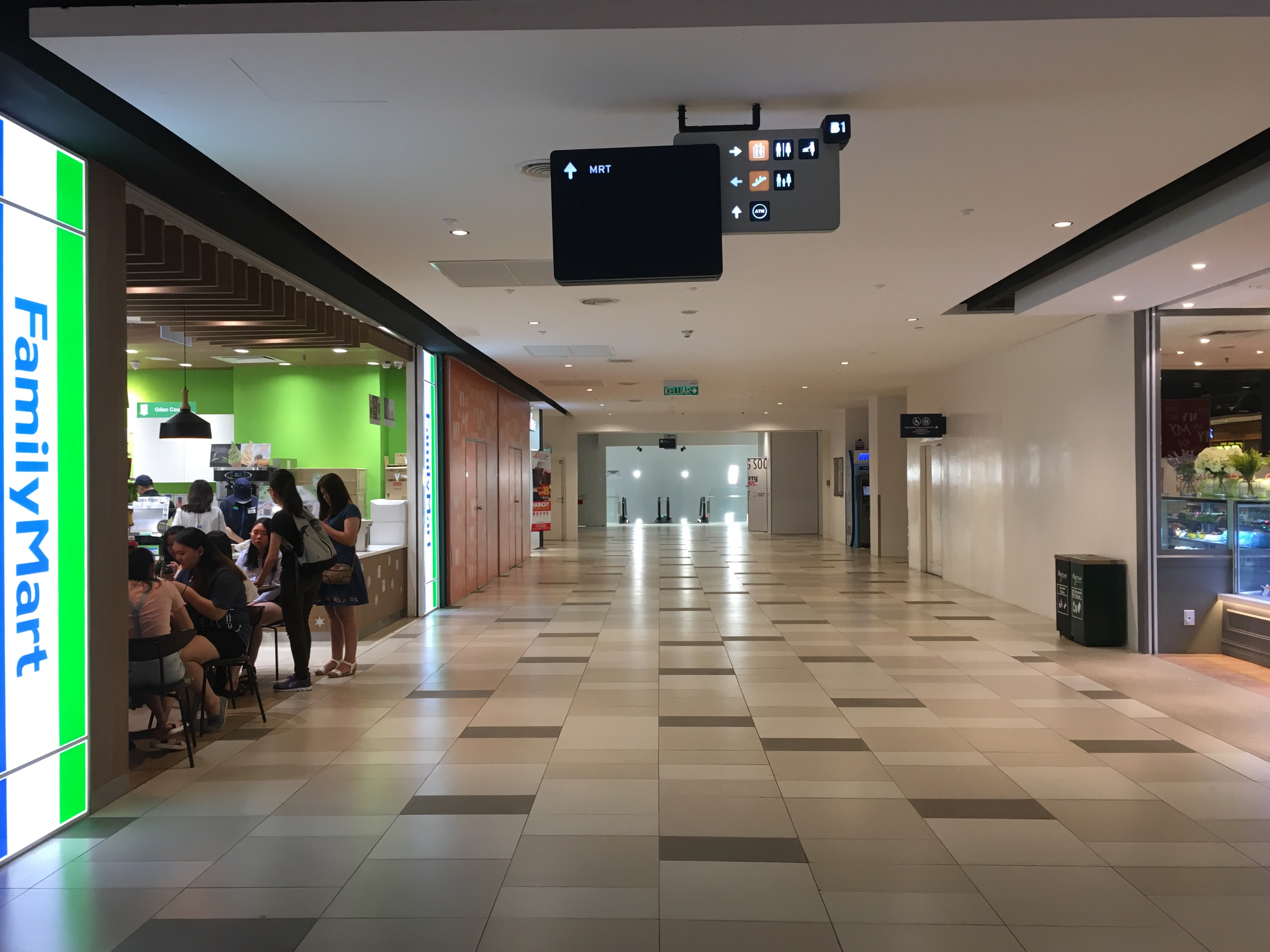
Corridor towards the linkway at MyTown Shopping Centre

=== Sunway Velocity linkway ===
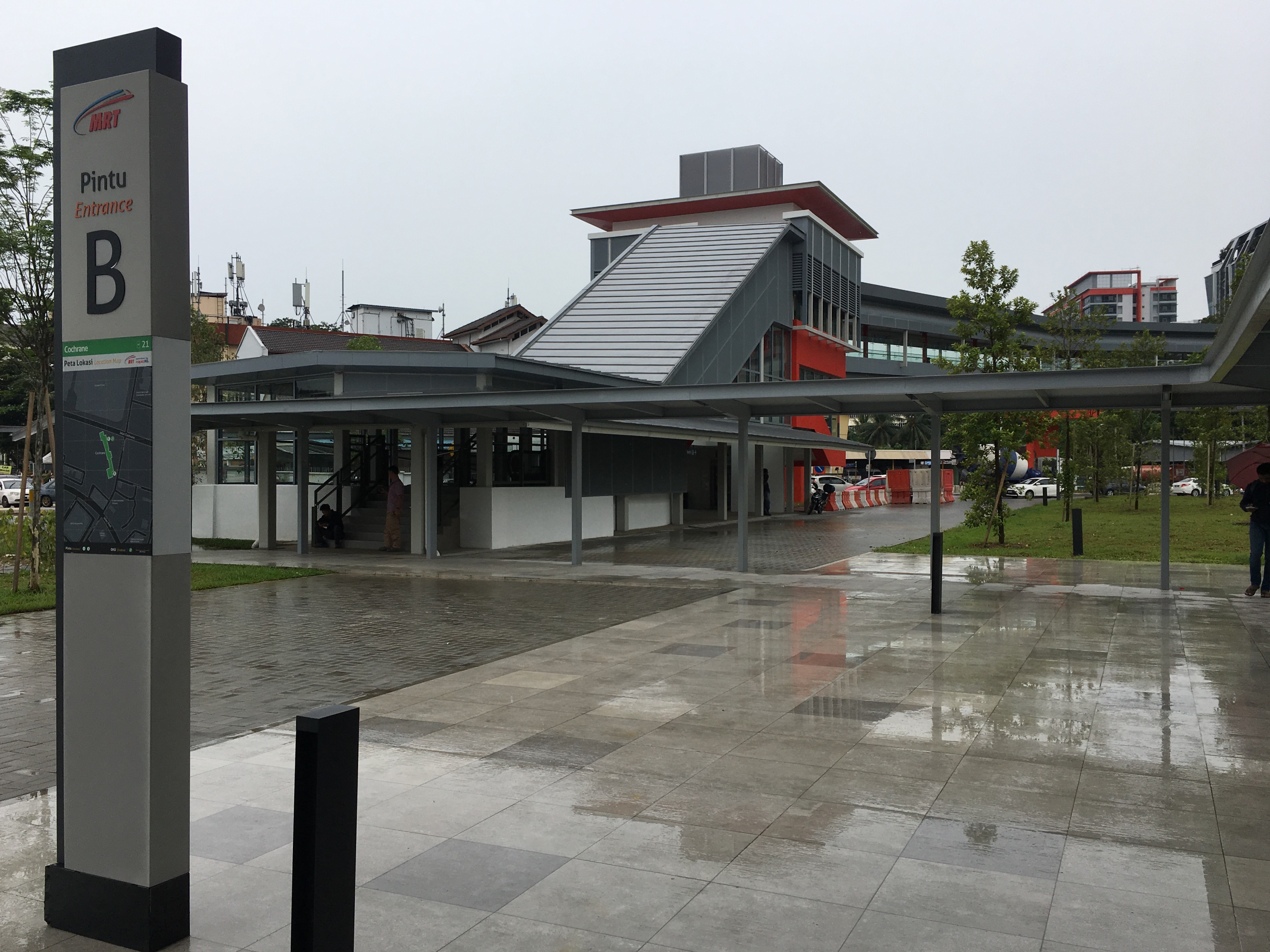
Start of linkway at Entrance B of the station

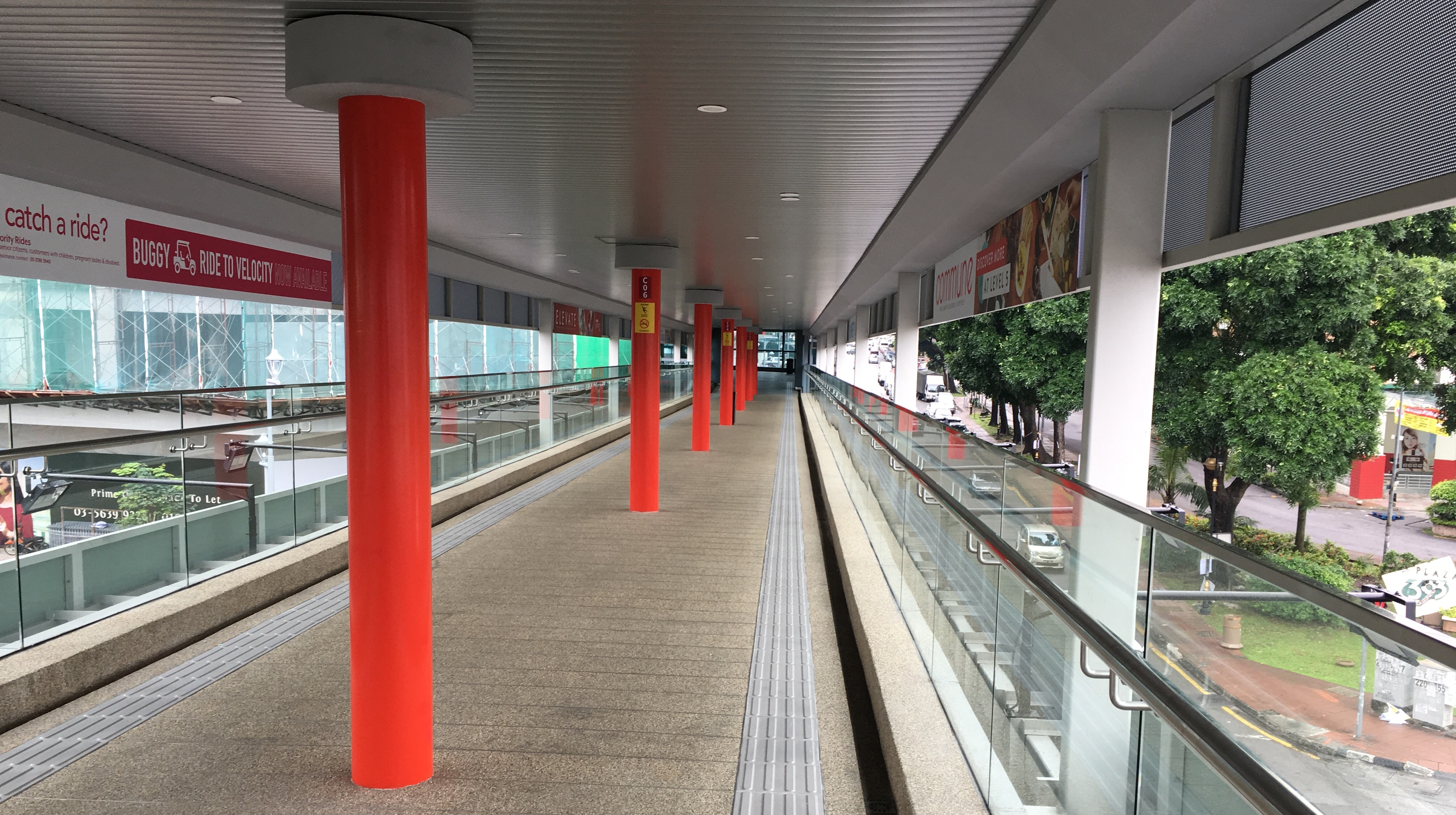
View of the linkway

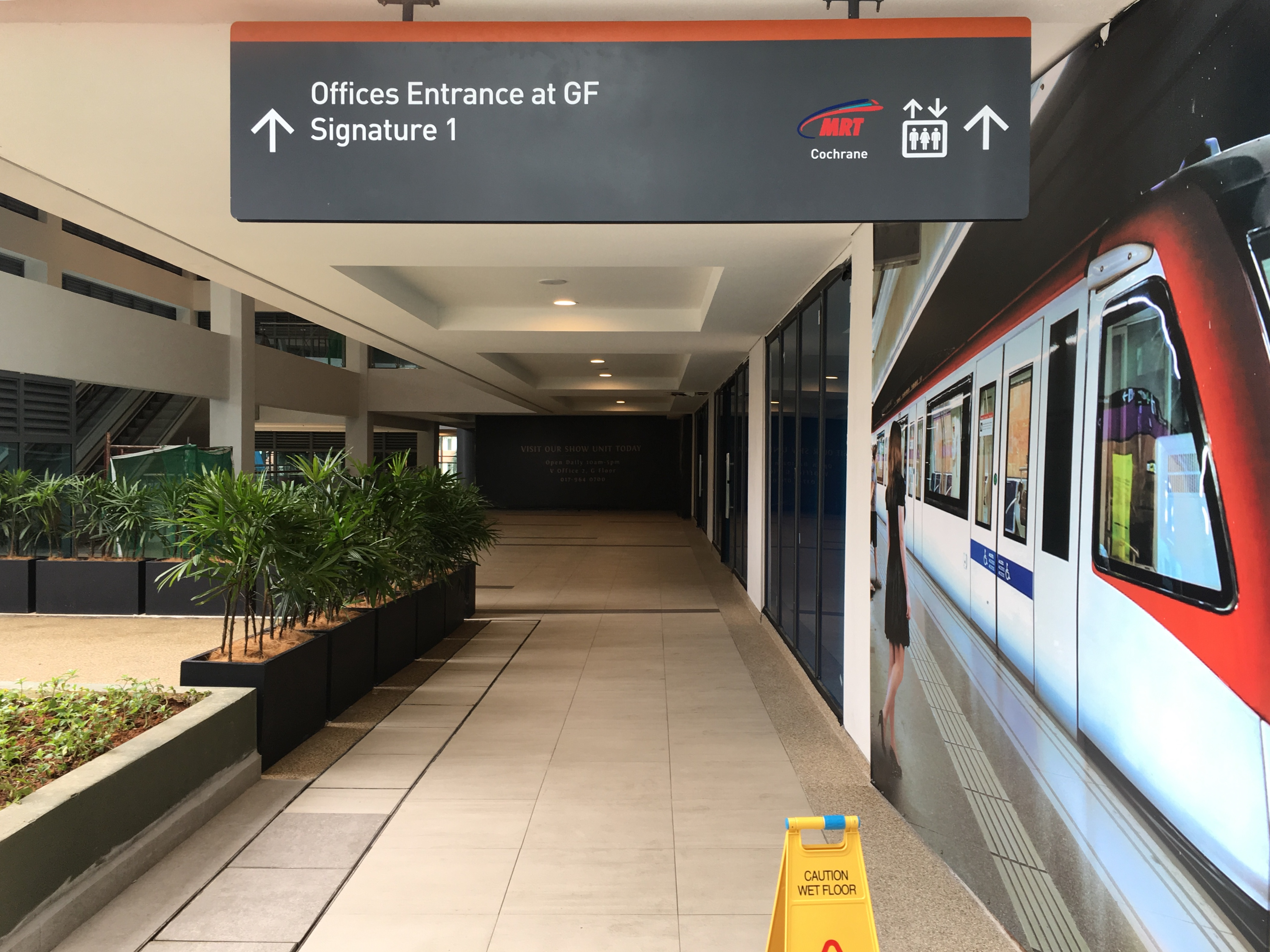
Signage inside Sunway Velocity Mall to the MRT station

== See also ==
- Mutiara Damansara MRT station, on the same line, connected to another IKEA store
